= 2025–26 Al-Qadsiah FC season =

Al-Qadsiah
2025–26 season
- President: Bader Al-Reziza
- Manager: Míchel (until 15 December 2025); Brendan Rodgers (from 16 December 2025)
- Stadium: Prince Mohamed bin Fahd Stadium
- Pro League: 4th
- King's Cup: Quarter-finals
- Super Cup: Semi-finals
- Top goalscorer: League: Julián Quiñones (33); All: Julián Quiñones (37)

The 2025–26 season was Al-Qadsiah's second consecutive season in the Pro League, and their 58th year in their existence. Along with competing in the Pro League, the club also participated in the King's Cup and the Super Cup.

The season covers the period from 1 July 2025 to 30 June 2026.

== Players ==
=== Squad information ===
As of 1 February 2025

Note: Flags indicate national team as defined under FIFA eligibility rules; some limited exceptions apply. Players may hold more than one non-FIFA nationality.

No.	Pos.	Nation	Player
1	GK	BEL	Koen Casteels
2	DF	KSA	Mohammed Abu Al-Shamat
3	DF	KSA	Mohammed Saadoun
4	DF	KSA	Jehad Thakri
6	DF	ESP	Nacho
7	MF	KSA	Turki Al-Ammar
8	MF	URU	Nahitan Nández
9	FW	BRA	Guga
11	MF	KSA	Ali Hazazi
12	DF	KSA	Mohammed Al-Shanqiti
13	DF	KSA	Ahmed Kaabi
14	MF	KSA	Saif Rashad
15	MF	KSA	Hussain Al-Qahtani
17	DF	URU	Gastón Álvarez
18	FW	KSA	Haitham Asiri
23	DF	KSA	Abdullah Hassoun
24	DF	KSA	Mohammed Qassem

No.	Pos.	Nation	Player
28	GK	KSA	Ahmed Al-Kassar
30	FW	ESP	Iker Almena
33	FW	MEX	Julián Quiñones
39	MF	KSA	Abdulrahman Al-Dawsari
40	MF	KSA	Ibrahim Mahnashi
47	MF	KSA	Bader Al-Omair
49	DF	ESP	Alejandro Vergaz
66	FW	KSA	Abdulaziz Al-Othman
86	MF	KSA	Khalid Hazazi
87	DF	KSA	Qassem Lajami
88	MF	ESP	Cameron Puertas
—	DF	KSA	Mousa Al-Harbi
—	DF	ESP	Carlos Jiménez
—	DF	KSA	Taher Wadi
—	MF	KSA	Mohammed Al-Marri
—	MF	ESP	Miguel Carvalho
—	MF	ESP	Aarón Martín
—	FW	GHA	Jerry Afriyie

== Transfers and loans ==
=== Transfers in ===
Entry date	Position	No.	Player	From club	Fee	Ref.
30 June 2025	DF	–	(Saudi Arabia) Mousa Al-Harbi	(Saudi Arabia) Al-Jabalain	End of loan	
30 June 2025	DF	–	(Saudi Arabia) Mohammed Al-Shanqiti	(Saudi Arabia) Al-Orobah	End of loan	
30 June 2025	DF	–	(Spain) Carlos Jiménez	(Spain) Villarreal B	End of loan	
30 June 2025	DF	–	(Saudi Arabia) Taher Wadi	(Saudi Arabia) Al-Diriyah	End of loan	
30 June 2025	MF	47	(Saudi Arabia) Bader Al-Omair	(Saudi Arabia) Al-Batin	End of loan	
30 June 2025	MF	80	(Spain) Miguel Carvalho	(Spain) Mérida	End of loan	
30 June 2025	MF	99	(Saudi Arabia) Nafea Al-Sumairi	(Saudi Arabia) Al-Rawdhah	End of loan	
30 June 2025	MF	–	(Saudi Arabia) Mohammed Al-Marri	(Saudi Arabia) Al-Tai	End of loan	
30 June 2025	MF	–	(Spain) Aarón Martín	(Spain) Tenerife	End of loan	
30 June 2025	FW	–	(Ghana) Jerry Afriyie	(Spain) CD Lugo	End of loan	
1 July 2025	DF	71	(Saudi Arabia) Mohammed Al-Thani	(Saudi Arabia) Al-Hazem	$2,666,000	
1 July 2025	MF	–	(Saudi Arabia) Anas Al-Ahmadi	(Saudi Arabia) Ohod	Undisclosed	
1 July 2025	FW	9	(Saudi Arabia) Abdullah Al-Salem	(Saudi Arabia) Al-Khaleej	Free	
7 July 2025	MF	22	(Ghana) Christopher Bonsu Baah	(Belgium) Genk	$20,000,000	
21 July 2025	FW	32	(Italy) Mateo Retegui	(Italy) Atalanta	$76,350,000	
25 July 2025	GK	50	(Saudi Arabia) Meshari Sanyor	(Saudi Arabia) Al-Raed	$1,333,000	
28 July 2025	DF	12	(Saudi Arabia) Yasser Al-Shahrani	(Saudi Arabia) Al-Hilal	Free	
3 August 2025	MF	10	(Saudi Arabia) Musab Al-Juwayr	(Saudi Arabia) Al-Hilal	$13,330,000	
17 August 2025	FW	20	(Brazil) Gabriel Carvalho	(Brazil) Internacional	$16,000,000	
1 September 2025	MF	5	(Germany) Julian Weigl	(Germany) Borussia Mönchengladbach	$8,200,000	
9 September 2025	MF	25	(Portugal) Otávio	(Saudi Arabia) Al-Nassr	Free	

=== Transfers out ===
Exit date	Position	No.	Player	To club	Fee	Ref.
30 June 2025	GK	25	(Saudi Arabia) Abdulaziz Al-Awairdhi	(Saudi Arabia) Al-Riyadh	End of loan	
31 July 2025	FW	10	(Gabon) Pierre-Emerick Aubameyang	(France) Marseille	Free	
1 August 2025	DF	–	(Saudi Arabia) Taher Wadi	(Saudi Arabia) Al-Diriyah	Free	
22 August 2025	MF	39	(Saudi Arabia) Abdulrahman Al-Dawsari	(Saudi Arabia) Al-Kholood	Undisclosed	
1 September 2025	MF	5	(Argentina) Equi Fernández	(Germany) Bayer Leverkusen	$29,300,000	
11 September 2025	MF	–	(Saudi Arabia) Mohammed Al-Marri	(Saudi Arabia) Al-Adalah	Free	
15 September 2025	MF	99	(Saudi Arabia) Nafea Al-Sumairi	(Saudi Arabia) Al-Jeel	Free	
30 September 2025	DF	–	(Saudi Arabia) Mohammed Al-Shanqiti	(Saudi Arabia) Al-Faisaly	Free	
18 October 2025	DF	23	(Saudi Arabia) Abdullah Hassoun	(Saudi Arabia) Al-Riyadh	Free	
14 January 2026	DF	71	(Saudi Arabia) Mohammed Al-Thani	(Saudi Arabia) Al-Shabab	$2,133,000	

=== Loans out ===
Start date	End date	Position	No.	Player	To club	Fee	Ref.
4 August 2025	End of season	MF	–	(Spain) Aarón Martín	(Spain) Mirandés	None	
12 August 2025	End of season	DF	55	(Saudi Arabia) Mousa Al-Harbi	(Saudi Arabia) Al-Bukiryah	None	
23 August 2025	End of season	FW	9	(Brazil) Guga	(Saudi Arabia) Al-Kholood	None	
23 August 2025	End of season	FW	44	(Ghana) Jerry Afriyie	(Belgium) La Louvière	None	
2 September 2025	End of season	DF	–	(Spain) Carlos Jiménez	(Spain) Eldense	None	
4 September 2025	End of season	MF	23	(Spain) Cameron Puertas	(Germany) Werder Bremen	None	
5 September 2025	End of season	MF	30	(Spain) Iker Almena	(Croatia) Hajduk Split	None	
8 September 2025	End of season	MF	80	(Spain) Miguel Carvalho	(Saudi Arabia) Al-Hazem	None	
11 September 2025	End of season	FW	66	(Saudi Arabia) Abdulaziz Al-Othman	(Saudi Arabia) Al-Shabab	None	

== Pre-season ==
19 July 2025 Friendly	Al-Qadsiah (Saudi Arabia)	0–1	(Belgium) Sint-Truiden	Venlo, Netherlands
16:00 CEST		Report	Ferrari

31 July 2025 Friendly	Al-Qadsiah (Saudi Arabia)	0–0	(Spain) Levante	La Nucia, Spain
CEST		Report		Stadium: Estadi Olímpic Camilo Cano

4 August 2025 Friendly	Al-Qadsiah (Saudi Arabia)	2–2	(Spain) Sevilla	Seville, Spain
21:00 CEST	Retegui 30' (pen.); Carvalho 90+4'	Report	Lukébakio 8'; Idumbo 59'	Stadium: Ramón Sánchez-Pizjuán Stadium

9 August 2025 Friendly	Al-Qadsiah (Saudi Arabia)	0–0	(England) Nottingham Forest	West Bridgford, England
19:45 BST		Report		Stadium: City Ground

== Competitions ==
=== Overview ===
Competition	Record							
Competition	Pld	W	D	L	GF	GA	GD	Win %
Pro League	34	23	8	3	83	34	+49	67.65
King's Cup	3	2	1	0	9	5	+4	66.67
Super Cup	1	0	0	1	1	5	−4	0.00
Total	38	25	9	4	93	44	+49	65.79

Source: Competitions

=== Pro League ===
==== League table ====
Pos	Team	Pld	W	D	L	GF	GA	GD	Pts	Qualification or relegation
2	Al-Hilal	34	25	9	0	85	27	+58	84	Qualification for AFC Champions League Elite league stage (Note: Al-Ahli also qualified as 2025–26 AFC Champions League Elite winners.)
3	Al-Ahli	34	25	6	3	71	25	+46	81	Qualification for AFC Champions League Elite league stage
4	Al-Qadsiah	34	23	8	3	83	34	+49	77	Qualification for AFC Champions League Elite league stage
5	Al-Ittihad	34	16	7	11	55	48	+7	55	Qualification for AFC Champions League Elite preliminary stage
6	Al-Taawoun	34	15	8	11	59	46	+13	53	Qualification for AFC Champions League Two group stage (Note: Since the winners of the 2025–26 King's Cup, Al-Hilal, had already qualified for the Champions League Elite, the spot given to the King's Cup winners (Champions League Two) was passed to the sixth-placed team.)

Source: SPL
Rules for classification: 1) Points; 2) Head-to-head points; 3) Head-to-head goal difference; 4) Total goal difference; 5) Total goals scored; 6) Fair-play points
(Note: Head-to-head record is used only after all the matches between the teams in question have been played).

==== Results summary ====
Overall								Home						Away					
Pld	W	D	L	GF	GA	GD	Pts	W	D	L	GF	GA	GD	W	D	L	GF	GA	GD
34	23	8	3	83	34	+49	77	11	6	0	40	13	+27	12	2	3	43	21	+22

Last updated: 21 May 2026.
Source: Saudi Pro League

==== Results by round ====
Round	1	2	3	4	5	6	7	8	9	11	12	13	14	15	16	17	18	19	20	21	22	23	10	24	25	26	27	28	29	30	31	32	33	34
Ground	H	A	H	A	A	H	A	H	A	H	A	H	A	H	A	H	A	H	A	H	H	A	H	H	A	H	A	A	H	A	H	A	H	A
Result	W	D	W	W	W	D	L	W	L	D	W	W	W	W	W	W	W	D	W	D	W	W	W	D	W									
Position	4	4	3	2	2	4	4	4	5	5	5	5	5	5	5	4	4	4	4	4	4	4	4	4	4									

Updated to match(es) played on 7 March 2026. Source: Saudi Pro League
A = Away; H = Home; W = Win; D = Draw; L = Loss

==== Matches ====
All times are local, AST (UTC+3).

Win Draw Loss Postponed

30 August 2025 1	Al-Qadsiah	3–1	Al-Najma	Dammam
21:00	Retegui 5', 90+5'; Quiñones 45'	Report	Jasim 54'; Al-Kunaydiri (yellow card) 88'; Flores (yellow card) 90'	Stadium: Prince Mohamed bin Fahd Stadium; Attendance: 3,692; Referee: Kirill Levnikov (Russia)

13 September 2025 2	Al-Hilal	2–2	Al-Qadsiah	Riyadh
21:00	Núñez 49'; Koulibaly (yellow card) 70'; Neves 73' (pen.); Al-Tambakti (yellow card) 76'	Report	Bonsu Baah 6'; Quiñones 50'; Retegui (yellow card) 59'	Stadium: Kingdom Arena; Attendance: 17,875; Referee: Juan Martínez Munuera (Spain)

19 September 2025 3	Al-Qadsiah	2–1	Al-Khaleej	Dammam
18:15	Retegui 10'; Al-Salem 90+1'	Report	King (yellow card) 68', (goal) 78'; Masouras (yellow card) 90+4'	Stadium: Prince Mohamed bin Fahd Stadium; Attendance: 2,311; Referee: Sebastian Gishamer (Austria)

27 September 2025 4	Al-Fateh	0–1	Al-Qadsiah	Al-Hasa
21:00	Youssouf (yellow card) 34'; Pacheco (red card) 39'; Batna (yellow card) 61'; Saâdane (yellow card) 90+7'	Report	Al-Shahrani (yellow card) 29'; Bonsu Baah (yellow card) 44'; Quiñones 51'; Nández (yellow card) 58'; Retegui (yellow card) 61'; Al-Ammar (yellow card) 77'	Stadium: Al-Fateh Club Stadium; Attendance: 10,519; Referee: Florian Badstübner (Germany)

19 October 2025 5	Neom	1–3	Al-Qadsiah	Tabuk
21:00	Hegazi (yellow card) 31'; Lacazette (yellow card) 34', (goal) 66'; Al-Hassan (yellow card) 86'; Zézé (yellow card) 90'; Al-Oyayari (yellow card) 90+5'	Report	Quiñones 11', 45', 88'; Nacho (yellow card) 29'; Otávio (yellow card) 45+3'	Stadium: King Khalid Sport City Stadium; Attendance: 6,576; Referee: Tamás Bognár (Hungary)

25 October 2025 6	Al-Qadsiah	0–0	Al-Okhdood	Dammam
17:40	Weigl (yellow card) 30'; Nández (yellow card) 69'	Report	Abu Abd (yellow card) 62' (yellow-red card) 70'; Petros (yellow card) 71'	Stadium: Prince Mohamed bin Fahd Stadium; Attendance: 6,482; Referee: Anastasios Sidiropoulos (Greece)

1 November 2025 7	Al-Taawoun	2–0	Al-Qadsiah	Buraidah
16:30	Al-Ahmed 57'; Fulgini 66'; Flávio (yellow card) 90+3'	Report	Weigl (yellow card) 89'	Stadium: King Abdullah Sports City; Attendance: 6,119; Referee: Nikola Dabanović (Montenegro)

6 November 2025 8	Al-Qadsiah	4–0	Al-Kholood	Dammam
20:30	Retegui 15' (pen.), 68'; Al-Juwayr 60'; Nández 65'	Report	Sawaan (yellow card) 58'; Enrique (yellow card) 71'	Stadium: Prince Mohamed bin Fahd Stadium; Attendance: 6,765; Referee: Serdar Gözübüyük (Netherlands)

21 November 2025 9	Al-Ahli	2–1	Al-Qadsiah	Jeddah
20:30	Galeno 6'; Atangana (yellow card) 29'; Al-Johani (red card) 45+4'; Kessié 66'; Al-Rashidi (yellow card) 71'; Al-Muwallad (yellow card) 73'	Report	Nacho (yellow card) 45+4'; Al-Salem 64'	Stadium: Alinma Stadium; Attendance: 17,404; Referee: Juan Martínez Munuera (Spain)

27 December 2025 11	Al-Qadsiah	1–1	Damac	Dammam
16:00	Retegui 45+1'; Abu Al-Shamat (yellow card) 57'	Report	Vada 4', (yellow card) 45+3'; Sylla (yellow card) 76'; Al-Khaibari (red card) 79'; Bedrane (yellow card) 86'; Kewin (yellow card) 90+3'	Stadium: Prince Mohamed bin Fahd Stadium; Attendance: 6,106; Referee: István Kovács (Romania)

31 December 2025 12	Al-Shabab	2–3	Al-Qadsiah	Riyadh
20:30	Hernández (yellow card) 30'; Matuq (yellow card) 39'; Hoedt (yellow card) 52'; Brownhill 61', (yellow card) 80'; Carrasco 90+2' (pen.)	Report	Retegui 12', (yellow card) 46'; Quiñones 31' (pen.); Nández 41'	Stadium: Prince Faisal bin Fahd Sports City Stadium; Attendance: 2,556; Referee: Sandro Schärer (Switzerland)

4 January 2026 13	Al-Qadsiah	4–0	Al-Riyadh	Dammam
20:30	Quiñones 1'; Nández 11'; Al-Shahrani (yellow card) 45+1'; Retegui 51' (pen.); Álvarez (yellow card) 66'; Al-Ammar (yellow card) 85', (goal) 90+1'	Report		Stadium: Prince Mohamed bin Fahd Stadium; Attendance: 6,160; Referee: Shukri Al-Hanfoush

8 January 2026 14	Al-Nassr	1–2	Al-Qadsiah	Riyadh
20:30	Ângelo (yellow card) 59'; Ronaldo 81' (pen.); Brozović (yellow card) 85'	Report	Nacho (yellow card) 39'; Quiñones 51'; Nández 66', (yellow card) 79'; Bonsu Baah (yellow card) 69'; Álvarez (yellow card) 70'; Hazazi (yellow card) 87'; Abu Al-Shamat (yellow card) 90+11'	Stadium: Al-Awwal Park; Attendance: 25,827; Referee: István Kovács (Romania)

14 January 2026 15	Al-Qadsiah	5–0	Al-Fayha	Dammam
17:45	Weigl (yellow card) 45'; Quiñones 47', 53', 61'; Nández (yellow card) 85'; Housa 87'; Retegui 90+3' (pen.)	Report	Al-Rashidi (yellow card) 56'	Stadium: Prince Mohamed bin Fahd Stadium; Attendance: 7,845; Referee: Sebastian Gishamer (Austria)

18 January 2026 16	Al-Hazem	1–5	Al-Qadsiah	Buraidah
18:15	Al-Dakheel (yellow card) 33'; Al-Habshi (yellow card) 53'; Bah 86'	Report	Retegui 56'; Al-Juwayr 61'; Quiñones 73'; Al-Nakhli 81' (o.g.); Thakri (yellow card) 88'; Abu Al-Shamat 90+4'	Stadium: King Abdullah Sports City; Attendance: 1,371; Referee: Kirill Levnikov (Russia)

22 January 2026 17	Al-Qadsiah	2–1	Al-Ittihad	Dammam
20:30	Álvarez (yellow card) 28'; Quiñones 37', 59', (yellow card) 90+7'; Bonsu Baah (yellow card) 51'	Report	Benzema 29' (pen.), (yellow card) 75'; Mitaj (yellow card) 39'	Stadium: Prince Mohamed bin Fahd Stadium; Attendance: 15,570; Referee: Facundo Tello (Argentina)

25 January 2026 18	Al-Najma	1–3	Al-Qadsiah	Buraidah
18:20	Hawsawi (yellow card) 11'; Al-Tulayhi 57'	Report	Flores 7' (o.g.); Quiñones 62'; Retegui 73'	Stadium: King Abdullah Sports City; Attendance: 3,107; Referee: Radu Petrescu (Romania)

29 January 2026 19	Al-Qadsiah	2–2	Al-Hilal	Dammam
20:30	Nández 10', (yellow card) 22'; Thakri (yellow card) 44'; Quiñones 76'; Bonsu Baah (yellow card) 89'	Report	Neves 8'; Malcom (yellow card) 16'; Kanno (yellow card) 22'; Al-Tambakti (yellow card) 59'; S. Al-Dawsari 90'	Stadium: Prince Mohamed bin Fahd Stadium; Attendance: 17,351; Referee: Raphael Claus (Brazil)

3 February 2026 20	Al-Khaleej FC	0–1	Al-Qadsiah	Dammam
20:30	Assiri (yellow card) 48'; Hamzi (yellow card) 58'; Donis (yellow card) 90+3'	Report	Retegui (yellow card) 32' (goal) 41'; Nández (yellow card) 35'; Hazazi (yellow card) 81'	Stadium: Prince Mohamed bin Fahd Stadium; Attendance: 1,809; Referee: (El Salvador) Iván Barton

7 February 2026 21	Al-Qadsiah	1–1	Al-Fateh	Dammam
20:30	Quiñones 13'	Report	Vargas 8'; Wesley Delgado (yellow card) 39'; Mohammed Al-Sahaihi (yellow card) 86'	Stadium: Prince Mohamed bin Fahd Stadium; Attendance: 8,472; Referee: (Germany) Sven Jablonski

12 February 2026 22	Al-Qadsiah	1–0	Neom	Dammam
20:30	Weigl (yellow card) 65'; Retegui (yellow card) 76'; Nández 90+4'; Al-Ammar (yellow card) 90+7'; Quiñones (yellow card) 90+9'	Report	Al-Dawsari (yellow card) 52'; Zézé (yellow card) 80'	Stadium: Prince Mohamed bin Fahd Stadium; Attendance: 6,952; Referee: (Lithuania) Donatas Rumšas

20 February 2026 23	Al-Okhdood	2–4	Al-Qadsiah	Najran
22:00	Bassogog 43'; Abdulaziz Al Hatila 86'	Report	Al-Ammar (yellow card) 6'; Álvarez (yellow card) 22'; Quiñones 34' 74' 87'; Al-Ahmed 50' (yellow card) 90+1'	Stadium: Prince Hathloul bin Abdulaziz Sports City Stadium; Attendance: 1,697; Referee: (Romania) Horațiu Feșnic

23 February 2026 10	Al-Qadsiah	4–0	Al-Ettifaq	Dammam
22:00	Nández 3'; Bonsu Baah 7'; Weigl (yellow card) 38' (goal) 90+3'; Al-Ahmed (yellow card) 78'; Quiñones 90+2'	Report	Hendry (yellow card) 6'; Costa (yellow card) 32'; Faris Al-Ghamdi (yellow card) 71'; Al-Khateeb (yellow card) 71' (yellow-red card) 80'	Stadium: Prince Mohamed bin Fahd Stadium; Attendance: 8,800; Referee: (Mexico) César Arturo Ramos

28 February 2026 24	Al-Qadsiah	1–1	Al Taawoun	Dammam
22:00	Retegui 45+4' (pen.) (yellow card) 81'; Al-Ahmed (yellow card) 72'	Report	Petkov 17'; Al-Hurayji (yellow card) 81'	Stadium: Prince Mohamed bin Fahd Stadium; Attendance: 6,142; Referee: (Greece) Anastasios Sidiropoulos

7 March 2026 25	Al-Kholood	1–4	Al-Qadsiah	Ar Rass
22:00	Enrique 4'; Bahebri (yellow card) 22'	Report	Quiñones 2' 27'; Thakri (yellow card) 10'; Retegui 21' 74'; Otávio (yellow card) 54'	Stadium: Al-Hazem Club Stadium; Attendance: 1,549; Referee: (Somalia) Omar Artan

=== King's Cup ===
All times are local, AST (UTC+3).

24 September 2025 Round of 32	Al-Orobah	1–3	Al-Qadsiah	Sakakah
21:00	Doumbia 16', (yellow card) 49'; Al-Hazmi (yellow card) 39'; Al-Juwaid (yellow card) 45+3'	Report	Quiñones 9'; Thakri (yellow card) 28'; Nacho 35'; Al-Juwayr 69' (pen.); Weigl (yellow card) 70'	Stadium: Al-Jouf University Stadium; Referee: Juan Gabriel Calderón (Costa Rica)

28 October 2025 Round of 16	Al-Qadsiah	3–1	Al-Hazem	Dammam
17:35	Retegui 22', (yellow card) 86'; Al-Shahrani (yellow card) 41'; Quiñones 54', 63' (pen.); Nacho (yellow card) 87'	Report	Al-Habshi 9'; Tunkar (yellow card) 49'	Stadium: Prince Mohamed bin Fahd Stadium; Attendance: 4,537; Referee: João Pinheiro (Portugal)

28 November 2025 Quarter-finals	Al-Ahli	3–3 (a.e.t.) (5–4 p)	Al-Qadsiah	Jeddah
20:30	Toney 36' (pen.); Ibañez (yellow card) 45+7'; Atangana 61', (yellow card) 77'; Kessié 73'; Mendy (yellow card) 90+2'	Report	Retegui 11', 45+4' (pen.); Quiñones 30'; Casteels (yellow card) 45+6'	Stadium: Prince Abdullah Al-Faisal Sports City Stadium; Attendance: 16,661; Referee: Luís Godinho (Portugal)
	Penalties
	Toney (penalty scored); Mahrez (penalty scored); Kessié (penalty scored); Abu Al-Shamat (penalty scored); Al-Buraikan (penalty scored)		(penalty scored) Retegui; (penalty missed) Al Salem; (penalty scored) Weigl; (penalty scored) Al-Juwayr; (penalty scored) Nacho

=== Super Cup ===
20 August 2025 Semi-finals	Al-Qadsiah	1–5	Al-Ahli	So Kon Po, Hong Kong
20:00 UTC+8	Álvarez 8'; Thakri (yellow card) 15'; Bonsu Baah (red card) 41'	Report	Kessié 12', 45+2'; Toney 28' (pen.), (yellow card) 56'; Millot 31'; Nacho 61' (o.g.)	Stadium: Hong Kong Stadium; Attendance: 16,253; Referee: Ricardo de Burgos Bengoetxea (Spain)

== Statistics ==
=== Appearances ===
Last updated on 29 January 2026.

No.	Pos	Nat	Player	Total		Pro League		King's Cup		Super Cup	
No.	Pos	Nat	Player	Apps	Goals	Apps	Goals	Apps	Goals	Apps	Goals
Goalkeepers
1	GK	(Belgium) BEL	Koen Casteels	22	0	18	0	3	0	1	0
28	GK	(Saudi Arabia) KSA	Ahmed Al-Kassar	1	0	0+1	0	0	0	0	0
31	GK	(Saudi Arabia) KSA	Abdullah Al-Muhaisen	0	0	0	0	0	0	0	0
50	GK	(Saudi Arabia) KSA	Meshari Sunyur	0	0	0	0	0	0	0	0
99	GK	(Saudi Arabia) KSA	Mohammed Al-Ibrahim	0	0	0	0	0	0	0	0
Defenders
2	DF	(Saudi Arabia) KSA	Mohammed Abu Al-Shamat	21	1	17+1	1	2+1	0	0	0
4	DF	(Saudi Arabia) KSA	Jehad Thakri	14	0	6+5	0	1+1	0	1	0
6	DF	(Spain) ESP	Nacho	22	1	18	0	3	1	1	0
12	DF	(Saudi Arabia) KSA	Yasser Al-Shahrani	21	0	12+6	0	2	0	0+1	0
17	DF	(Uruguay) URU	Gastón Álvarez	18	1	14	0	2+1	0	1	1
49	DF	(Spain) ESP	Alejandro Vergaz	0	0	0	0	0	0	0	0
87	DF	(Saudi Arabia) KSA	Qassem Lajami	4	0	2+2	0	0	0	0	0
Midfielders
5	MF	(Germany) GER	Julian Weigl	20	0	17	0	3	0	0	0
7	MF	(Saudi Arabia) KSA	Turki Al-Ammar	17	1	1+12	1	2+1	0	0+1	0
8	MF	(Uruguay) URU	Nahitan Nández	20	5	17	5	2	0	1	0
10	MF	(Saudi Arabia) KSA	Musab Al-Juwayr	20	3	16	2	0+3	1	0+1	0
11	MF	(Saudi Arabia) KSA	Ali Hazazi	20	0	4+12	0	0+3	0	1	0
15	MF	(Saudi Arabia) KSA	Hussain Al-Qahtani	4	0	0+4	0	0	0	0	0
22	MF	(Ghana) GHA	Christopher Bonsu Baah	21	1	17	1	1+2	0	1	0
25	MF	(Portugal) POR	Otávio	9	0	6	0	3	0	0	0
27	MF	(Saudi Arabia) KSA	Eyad Housa	1	1	0+1	1	0	0	0	0
40	MF	(Saudi Arabia) KSA	Ibrahim Mahnashi	6	0	0+5	0	0+1	0	0	0
Forwards
9	FW	(Saudi Arabia) KSA	Abdullah Al-Salem	17	2	1+12	2	1+2	0	0+1	0
19	FW	(Saudi Arabia) KSA	Haitham Asiri	1	0	0+1	0	0	0	0	0
20	FW	(Brazil) BRA	Gabriel Carvalho	5	0	0+2	0	2	0	0+1	0
32	FW	(Italy) ITA	Mateo Retegui	21	14	17+1	11	2	3	1	0
33	FW	(Mexico) MEX	Julián Quiñones	19	21	15	17	3	4	1	0
Players sent out on loan this season
23	MF	(Spain) ESP	Cameron Puertas	1	0	0	0	0	0	1	0
66	FW	(Saudi Arabia) KSA	Abdulaziz Al-Othman	0	0	0	0	0	0	0	0
80	MF	(Spain) ESP	Miguel Carvalho	1	0	0+1	0	0	0	0	0
Player who made an appearance this season but have left the club
71	DF	(Saudi Arabia) KSA	Mohammed Al-Thani	9	0	0+7	0	1	0	1	0
14	MF	(Saudi Arabia) KSA	Saif Rashad	4	0	0+3	0	0+1	0	0	0

=== Goalscorers ===
Rank	No.	Pos	Nat	Name	Pro League	King's Cup	Super Cup	Total
1	33	FW	(Mexico)	Julián Quiñones	17	4	0	21
2	32	FW	(Italy)	Mateo Retegui	11	3	0	14
3	8	MF	(Uruguay)	Nahitan Nández	5	0	0	5
4	10	MF	(Saudi Arabia)	Musab Al-Juwayr	2	1	0	3
5	9	FW	(Saudi Arabia)	Abdullah Al-Salem	2	0	0	2
6	2	DF	(Saudi Arabia)	Mohammed Abu Al-Shamat	1	0	0	1
6	6	DF	(Spain)	Nacho	0	1	0	1
6	7	MF	(Saudi Arabia)	Turki Al-Ammar	1	0	0	1
6	17	DF	(Uruguay)	Gastón Álvarez	0	0	1	1
6	22	MF	(Ghana)	Christopher Bonsu Baah	1	0	0	1
6	27	MF	(Saudi Arabia)	Eyad Housa	1	0	0	1
Own goal					2	0	0	2
Total					43	9	1	53

Last Updated: 29 January 2026

=== Assists ===
Rank	No.	Pos	Nat	Name	Pro League	King's Cup	Super Cup	Total
1	10	MF	(Saudi Arabia)	Musab Al-Juwayr	8	0	0	8
2	2	DF	(Saudi Arabia)	Mohammed Abu Al-Shamat	5	0	0	5
2	22	MF	(Ghana)	Christopher Bonsu Baah	4	0	1	5
4	8	MF	(Uruguay)	Nahitan Nández	3	1	0	4
5	5	MF	(Germany)	Julian Weigl	2	0	0	2
5	7	MF	(Saudi Arabia)	Turki Al-Ammar	2	0	0	2
5	25	MF	(Brazil)	Otávio	0	2	0	2
8	14	MF	(Saudi Arabia)	Saif Rashad	1	0	0	1
8	20	MF	(Brazil)	Gabriel Carvalho	0	1	0	1
8	32	FW	(Italy)	Mateo Retegui	0	1	0	1
8	33	FW	(Mexico)	Julián Quiñones	1	0	0	1
Total					25	5	1	31

Last Updated: 29 January 2026

=== Clean sheets ===
Rank	No.	Pos	Nat	Name	Pro League	King's Cup	Super Cup	Total
1	1	GK	(Belgium)	Koen Casteels	5	0	0	5
Total					5	0	0	5

Last Updated: 14 January 2026
