= 2024–25 Al-Qadsiah FC season =

Al-Qadsiah
2024–25 season
- President: Bader Al-Reziza
- Manager: Míchel
- Stadium: Prince Mohamed bin Fahd Stadium
- Pro League: 4th
- King's Cup: Runners-up (knocked out by Al-Ittihad)
- Top goalscorer: League: Julián Quiñones (20); All: Julián Quiñones (25)
- Highest home attendance: 20,115 v Al-Ittihad; 6 March 2025; Saudi Pro League
- Lowest home attendance: 4,045 v Al-Fayha; 7 November 2024; Saudi Pro League
- Average home league attendance: 9,906
Home colours

The 2024–25 season was Al-Qadsiah's first season back in the Pro League following their promotion in the previous year, and their 58th year in their existence. Along with competing in the Pro League, the club also participated in the King's Cup.

The season covers the period from 1 July 2024 to 30 June 2025.

== Players ==
=== Squad information ===
As of 1 February 2025

Note: Flags indicate national team as defined under FIFA eligibility rules; some limited exceptions apply. Players may hold more than one non-FIFA nationality.

No.	Pos.	Nation	Player
1	GK	BEL	Koen Casteels
2	DF	KSA	Mohammed Aboulshamat
3	DF	KSA	Mohammed Saadoun
4	DF	KSA	Jehad Thakri
5	MF	ARG	Equi Fernández
6	DF	ESP	Nacho
7	MF	KSA	Turki Al-Ammar
8	MF	URU	Nahitan Nández
9	FW	BRA	Guga
10	FW	GAB	Pierre-Emerick Aubameyang
11	MF	KSA	Ali Hazazi
13	DF	KSA	Ahmed Kaabi
14	MF	KSA	Saif Rashad
15	MF	KSA	Hussain Al-Qahtani
17	DF	URU	Gastón Álvarez

No.	Pos.	Nation	Player
18	FW	KSA	Haitham Asiri
23	DF	KSA	Abdullah Hassoun
24	DF	KSA	Mohammed Qassem
25	GK	KSA	Abdulaziz Al-Awairdhi (on loan from Al-Riyadh)
28	GK	KSA	Ahmed Al-Kassar
30	FW	ESP	Iker Almena
33	FW	MEX	Julián Quiñones
39	MF	KSA	Abdulrahman Al-Dawsari
40	MF	KSA	Ibrahim Mahnashi
49	DF	ESP	Alejandro Vergaz
66	FW	KSA	Abdulaziz Al-Othman
86	MF	KSA	Khalid Hazazi
87	DF	KSA	Qassem Lajami
88	MF	ESP	Cameron Puertas

=== Out on loan ===
Note: Flags indicate national team as defined under FIFA eligibility rules; some limited exceptions apply. Players may hold more than one non-FIFA nationality.

No.	Pos.	Nation	Player
12	DF	KSA	Mohammed Al-Shanqiti (at Al-Orobah until 30 June 2025)
47	MF	KSA	Bader Al-Omair (at Al-Batin until 30 June 2025)
99	MF	KSA	Nafea Al-Sumairi (at Al-Rawdhah until 30 June 2025)
—	DF	KSA	Mousa Al-Harbi (at Al-Jabalain until 30 June 2025)
—	DF	ESP	Carlos Jiménez (at Villarreal B until 30 June 2025)

No.	Pos.	Nation	Player
—	DF	KSA	Taher Wadi (at Al-Diriyah until 30 June 2025)
—	MF	KSA	Mohammed Al-Marri (at Al-Tai until 30 June 2025)
—	MF	ESP	Miguel Carvalho (at Mérida until 30 June 2025)
—	MF	ESP	Aarón Martín (at Tenerife until 30 June 2025)
—	FW	GHA	Jerry Afriyie (at CD Lugo until 30 June 2025)

== Transfers and loans ==
=== Transfers in ===
Entry date	Position	No.	Player	From club	Fee	Ref.
30 June 2024	MF	10	(Saudi Arabia) Saleh Aboulshamat	(Saudi Arabia) Al-Taawoun	End of loan	
30 June 2024	MF	88	(Saudi Arabia) Naif Masoud	(Saudi Arabia) Al-Khaleej	End of loan	
30 June 2024	MF	99	(Saudi Arabia) Nafea Al-Sumairi	(Saudi Arabia) Al-Jeel	End of loan	
30 June 2024	MF	–	(Saudi Arabia) Ibrahim Jaafari	(Saudi Arabia) Al-Zulfi	End of loan	
30 June 2024	FW	49	(Saudi Arabia) Eissa Al Thakrallah	(Saudi Arabia) Mudhar	End of loan	
1 July 2024	GK	1	(Belgium) Koen Casteels	(Germany) Wolfsburg	Free	
1 July 2024	DF	6	(Spain) Nacho	(Spain) Real Madrid	Free	
1 July 2024	MF	8	(Uruguay) Nahitan Nández	(Italy) Cagliari	Free	
1 July 2024	MF	15	(Saudi Arabia) Hussain Al-Qahtani	(Saudi Arabia) Al-Shabab	Free	
1 July 2024	FW	33	(Mexico) Julián Quiñones	(Mexico) América	$15,000,000	
8 July 2024	DF	24	(Saudi Arabia) Mohammed Qassem	(Saudi Arabia) Al-Nassr	Free	
14 July 2024	DF	87	(Saudi Arabia) Qassem Lajami	(Saudi Arabia) Al-Fateh	Free	
14 July 2024	MF	11	(Saudi Arabia) Ali Hazazi	(Saudi Arabia) Al-Ettifaq	$6,000,000	
18 July 2024	FW	10	(Gabon) Pierre-Emerick Aubameyang	(France) Marseille	$5,450,000	
5 August 2024	MF	5	(Argentina) Ezequiel Fernández	(Argentina) Boca Juniors	$20,000,000	
19 August 2024	DF	17	(Uruguay) Gastón Álvarez	(Spain) Getafe	$13,300,000	
20 August 2024	DF	–	(Spain) Carlos Jiménez	(Spain) Levante	$244,000	
26 August 2024	MF	88	(Switzerland) Cameron Puertas	(Belgium) Union SG	$16,600,000	
30 August 2024	FW	30	(Spain) Iker Almena	(Spain) Girona	$5,530,000	
1 September 2024	DF	49	(Spain) Alejandro Vergaz	(Spain) Real Betis B	Free	
3 September 2024	MF	16	(Saudi Arabia) Jathob Muslet	(Saudi Arabia) Al-Batin	Free	
3 September 2024	FW	18	(Saudi Arabia) Haitham Asiri	(Saudi Arabia) Al-Ahli	$2,930,000	
23 January 2025	FW	–	(Ghana) Jerry Afriyie	(Ghana) Thoughts	Free	
31 January 2025	MF	–	(Spain) Miguel Carvalho	(Spain) Espanyol B	$415,000	
3 February 2025	MF	–	(Spain) Aarón Martín	(Spain) Tenerife	$1,500,000	

=== Loans in ===
Start date	End date	Position	No.	Player	From club	Fee	Ref.
2 September 2024	End of season	GK	25	(Saudi Arabia) Abdulaziz Al-Awairdhi	(Saudi Arabia) Al-Riyadh	None	

=== Transfers out ===
Exit date	Position	No.	Player	To club	Fee	Ref.
30 June 2024	GK	1	(Saudi Arabia) Ahmed Al Jubaya	(Saudi Arabia) Al-Hilal	End of loan	
5 July 2024	DF	87	(Saudi Arabia) Faris Abdi	(Saudi Arabia) Al-Fayha	Free	
16 July 2024	FW	9	(Senegal) Mbaye Diagne	(Saudi Arabia) Neom	Free	
22 July 2024	MF	10	(Saudi Arabia) Saleh Aboulshamat	(Saudi Arabia) Al-Khaleej	Undisclosed	
22 July 2024	MF	20	(Saudi Arabia) Nawaf Al-Abed	(Saudi Arabia) Al-Riyadh	Free	
31 July 2024	GK	22	(Spain) Joel Robles	(Portugal) Estoril	Free	
6 August 2024	MF	–	(Saudi Arabia) Fahad Al-Ghodri	(Saudi Arabia) Al-Noor	Free	
15 August 2024	DF	94	(Portugal) Kévin Rodrigues	(Turkey) Kasımpaşa	Free	
26 August 2024	FW	70	(Saudi Arabia) Mohammed Al-Saiari	(Saudi Arabia) Al-Orobah	Free	
29 August 2024	MF	88	(Saudi Arabia) Naif Masoud	(Saudi Arabia) Al-Fateh	Free	
31 August 2024	FW	28	(Argentina) Luciano Vietto	(Argentina) Racing Club	Free	
1 September 2024	DF	4	(Saudi Arabia) Abdullah Hazazi	(Saudi Arabia) Al-Raed	Free	
2 September 2024	MF	6	(England) Max Power	(Denmark) AGF	Free	
3 September 2024	MF	7	(Saudi Arabia) Ayman Al-Khulaif	(Saudi Arabia) Al-Ula	Free	
11 September 2024	MF	19	(Peru) André Carrillo	(Brazil) Corinthians	Free	
1 October 2024	FW	77	(Saudi Arabia) Yasser Daribi	(Saudi Arabia) Al-Nahda	Free	
20 December 2024	DF	42	(Germany) Alexander Hack	(United States) New York Red Bulls	Free	
31 January 2025	MF	96	(Saudi Arabia) Hussain Al-Nattar	(Saudi Arabia) Al-Faisaly	Free	
4 February 2025	DF	33	(Spain) Álvaro González	(Malaysia) Johor Darul Ta'zim	Free	

=== Loans out ===
Start date	End date	Position	No.	Player	To club	Fee	Ref.
17 July 2024	End of season	DF	12	(Saudi Arabia) Taher Wadi	(Saudi Arabia) Al-Diriyah	None	
22 August 2024	End of season	DF	–	(Saudi Arabia) Mousa Al-Harbi	(Saudi Arabia) Al-Jabalain	None	
29 August 2024	End of season	DF	–	(Spain) Carlos Jiménez	(Spain) Villarreal B	None	
4 September 2024	End of season	MF	11	(Saudi Arabia) Mohammed Al-Marri	(Saudi Arabia) Al-Tai	None	
11 September 2024	End of season	MF	99	(Saudi Arabia) Nafea Al-Sumairi	(Saudi Arabia) Al-Rawdhah	None	
12 September 2024	End of season	MF	–	(Saudi Arabia) Bader Al-Omair	(Saudi Arabia) Al-Batin	None	
25 January 2025	End of season	FW	–	(Ghana) Jerry Afriyie	(Spain) CD Lugo	None	
31 January 2025	End of season	MF	–	(Spain) Miguel Carvalho	(Spain) Mérida	None	
1 February 2025	End of season	DF	12	(Saudi Arabia) Mohammed Al-Shanqiti	(Saudi Arabia) Al-Orobah	None	
3 February 2025	End of season	MF	–	(Spain) Aarón Martín	(Spain) Tenerife	None	

== Pre-season and friendlies ==
18 July 2024 Friendly	Al-Qadsiah (Saudi Arabia)	1–2	(Germany) Borussia Mönchengladbach II	Venlo, Netherlands
17:00 CEST	Al-Ammar	Report		Stadium: Sportpark Bakenbos

23 July 2024 Friendly	Al-Qadsiah (Saudi Arabia)	2–0	(Qatar) Al-Rayyan	Venlo, Netherlands
17:00 CEST	Rajab 52'; Carrillo 56'	Report		Stadium: Sportpark Bakenbos

26 July 2024 Friendly	Al-Qadsiah (Saudi Arabia)	2–2	(Greece) Olympiacos	Tiel, Netherlands
16:30 CEST	Quiñones 35'; Aubameyang 47'	Report	Chiquinho 17'; Al-Ghamdi 88' (o.g.)	Stadium: Sportpark De Lok

3 August 2024 Friendly	Al-Qadsiah (Saudi Arabia)	0–1	(Netherlands) Dordrecht	Dordrecht, Netherlands
14:30 CEST		Report	van der Sluijs 75'	Stadium: Stadion Krommedijk

12 August 2024 Friendly	Al-Qadsiah (Saudi Arabia)	1–1	(Saudi Arabia) Al-Khaleej	Khobar, Saudi Arabia
20:30 AST	Aubameyang 48'	Report	Hawsawi 66'	Stadium: Al-Qadsiah Club Stadium

16 August 2024 Friendly	Al-Qadsiah (Saudi Arabia)	1–1	(Saudi Arabia) Al-Ittihad	Jeddah, Saudi Arabia
21:30 AST	Aubameyang 72'	Report	Diaby 35'	Stadium: Prince Abdullah Al-Faisal Sports City

== Competitions ==
=== Overview ===
Competition	Record							
Competition	Pld	W	D	L	GF	GA	GD	Win %
Pro League	34	21	5	8	53	31	+22	61.76
King's Cup	5	4	0	1	11	5	+6	80.00
Total	39	25	5	9	64	36	+28	64.10

Updated to match played 30 May 2025
Source: Competitions

=== Pro League ===
==== League table ====
Pos	Team	Pld	W	D	L	GF	GA	GD	Pts	Qualification or relegation
2	Al-Hilal	34	23	6	5	95	41	+54	75	Qualification for AFC Champions League Elite League stage
3	Al-Nassr	34	21	7	6	80	38	+42	70	Qualification for AFC Champions League Two group stage (Note: Since the winners of the 2024–25 King's Cup, Al-Ittihad, had already qualified for the Champions League Elite, the spot given to the King's Cup winners (Champions League Two) was passed to the third-placed team.)
4	Al-Qadsiah	34	21	5	8	53	31	+22	68	
5	Al-Ahli	34	21	4	9	69	36	+33	67	Qualification for AFC Champions League Elite League stage (Note: By virtue of winning 2024–25 AFC Champions League Elite.)
6	Al-Shabab	34	18	6	10	65	41	+24	60	Qualification for the AGCFF Gulf Club Champions League group stage (Note: Al-Qadsiah withdrew from AGCFF Gulf Club Champions League, the spot was passed to the next highest-placed team who did not qualified to the Asian club competitions.)

Source: SPL
Rules for classification: 1) Points; 2) Head-to-head points; 3) Head-to-head goal difference; 4) Total goal difference; 5) Total goals scored; 6) Fair-play points
(Note: Head-to-head record is used only after all the matches between the teams in question have been played).

==== Results summary ====
Overall								Home						Away					
Pld	W	D	L	GF	GA	GD	Pts	W	D	L	GF	GA	GD	W	D	L	GF	GA	GD
34	21	5	8	53	31	+22	68	13	2	2	30	12	+18	8	3	6	23	19	+4

Last updated: 26 May 2025.
Source: Saudi Pro League

==== Results by round ====
Round	1	2	3	4	5	6	7	8	9	10	11	12	13	14	15	16	17	18	19	20	21	22	23	24	25	26	27	28	29	30	31	32	33	34
Ground	H	A	H	A	H	A	A	H	A	H	A	H	A	H	A	A	H	A	H	A	H	A	H	H	A	H	A	H	A	H	A	H	H	A
Result	W	W	L	D	W	L	L	W	W	W	W	W	W	L	W	W	W	D	W	W	W	L	W	D	L	D	L	W	D	W	W	W	W	L
Position	2	2	4	7	5	6	8	5	5	5	5	4	3	4	3	3	3	4	4	4	3	4	3	3	4	4	5	5	5	5	4	3	3	4

Updated to match(es) played on 26 May 2025. Source: Saudi Pro League
A = Away; H = Home; W = Win; D = Draw; L = Loss

==== Matches ====
All times are local, AST (UTC+3).

Win Draw Loss Postponed

23 August 2024 1	Al-Qadsiah	3–0	Al-Fateh	Dammam
21:00	Quiñones 34', 90+2', (yellow card) 49'; Al-Othman 73'; Fernández (yellow card) 83'	Report		Stadium: Prince Mohamed bin Fahd Stadium; Attendance: 5,265; Referee: Ahmed Al-Rumaikhani

27 August 2024 2	Al-Raed	0–1	Al-Qadsiah	Buraidah
21:00	Normann (yellow card) 45+3'; Fouzair (yellow card) 71'; Al-Amri (yellow card) 90+7'	Report	Álvarez (yellow card) 45+1'; Qassem (yellow card) 59'; Al-Ammar 79'	Stadium: Al-Raed Club Stadium; Attendance: 1,651; Referee: Mohammed Al-Smail

15 September 2024 3	Al-Qadsiah	0–1	Al-Shabab	Dammam
18:20	Fernández (yellow card) 17'; Almena (yellow card) 52'; Nández (yellow card) 63'; Al-Qahtani (yellow card) 79'; Rashad (yellow card) 90+6'	Report	Kanabah 14'; Hoedt (yellow card) 35'; Kim Seung-gyu (yellow card) 82'; Al-Thani (yellow card) 89'	Stadium: Prince Mohamed bin Fahd Stadium; Attendance: 6,175; Referee: Faisal Al-Blwi

19 September 2024 4	Al-Okhdood	0–0	Al-Qadsiah	Najran
18:40	Lowe (yellow card) 16' (yellow-red card) 90+7'; Pedroza (yellow card) 82'	Report	Quiñones (red card) 45'; Nández (yellow card) 87'; Nacho (yellow card) 90+3'	Stadium: Prince Hathloul bin Abdul Aziz Sports City; Attendance: 1,219; Referee: Sultan Al-Harbi

27 September 2024 5	Al-Qadsiah	1–0	Al-Ahli	Dammam
21:00	Asiri (yellow card) 39'; Aubameyang 43' (pen.); Nández (yellow card) 88'	Report	Al-Johani (yellow card) 90+12'	Stadium: Prince Mohamed bin Fahd Stadium; Attendance: 14,023; Referee: Khaled Al-Teris

4 October 2024 6	Al-Riyadh	2–1	Al-Qadsiah	Riyadh
18:15	Kal 24', (yellow card) 69'; Bayesh 59'; Tozé (yellow card) 88'	Report	Nández (yellow card) 57'; Al-Othman 79'	Stadium: Prince Faisal bin Fahd Sports City; Attendance: 1,123; Referee: Iván Barton (El Salvador)

19 October 2024 7	Al-Ittihad	3–1	Al-Qadsiah	Jeddah
21:00	Benzema 7'; Fabinho (yellow card) 37'; Diaby 67'; Mitaj 81'	Report	Aubameyang 20'; Aboulshamat (yellow card) 38'	Stadium: King Abdullah Sports City; Attendance: 35,654; Referee: Sergei Karasev (Russia)

25 October 2024 8	Al-Qadsiah	2–1	Damac	Dammam
17:35	Quiñones 39'; Nacho (yellow card) 50'; Hazazi (yellow card) 86'; Aubameyang 88'	Report	Abdullah (yellow card) 56'; Diallo 90+5'	Stadium: Prince Mohamed bin Fahd Stadium; Attendance: 9,634; Referee: Jesús Valenzuela (Venezuela)

2 November 2024 9	Al-Ettifaq	0–2	Al-Qadsiah	Dammam
21:00	Al-Sebyani (yellow card) 14'; Al-Malki (yellow card) 85'; Madu (yellow card) 90+6'	Report	Álvarez 12', (yellow card) 75'; Quiñones 45+3', (yellow card) 79'; Nacho (yellow card) 90+6'	Stadium: EGO Stadium; Attendance: 9,124; Referee: Anastasios Sidiropoulos (Greece)

7 November 2024 10	Al-Qadsiah	2–0	Al-Fayha	Dammam
17:30	Al-Ammar 4'; Nández (yellow card) 31'; Aubameyang 44' (pen.); Hazazi (yellow card) 75'	Report	Al-Baqawi (yellow card) 29'; Cimirot (yellow card) 45+1'; Smalling (yellow card) 58'; Pozuelo (yellow card) 76'; Al-Hussain (yellow card) 90'; Shukurov (yellow card) 90+5'	Stadium: Prince Mohamed bin Fahd Stadium; Attendance: 4,045; Referee: Cláudio Pereira (Portugal)

22 November 2024 11	Al-Nassr	1–2	Al-Qadsiah	Riyadh
20:00	Ronaldo 32'; Maran (yellow card) 81'	Report	Quiñones 37', (yellow card) 66'; Thakri (yellow card) 45'; Aubameyang 50'; Nández (yellow card) 82'	Stadium: Al-Awwal Park; Attendance: 18,471; Referee: Sergey Ivanov (Russia)

29 November 2024 12	Al-Qadsiah	1–0	Al-Khaleej	Dammam
17:25	Álvarez (yellow card) 90+2'; Al-Othman 90+5'	Report		Stadium: Prince Mohamed bin Fahd Stadium; Attendance: 11,234; Referee: Matthew Conger (New Zealand)

6 December 2024 13	Al-Kholood	0–3	Al-Qadsiah	Buraidah
17:50	Al-Shehri (red card) 44'	Report	Quiñones 10', 71', (yellow card) 34'; Aubameyang 49'; Al-Ammar (yellow card) 74'	Stadium: King Abdullah Sports City; Attendance: 1,134; Referee: Christian Dingert (Germany)

11 January 2025 14	Al-Qadsiah	0–3	Al-Taawoun	Dammam
17:40	Aboulshamat (yellow card) 17'; Al-Ammar (yellow card) 46'	Report	Barrow 1', 75', (yellow card) 12'; Fajr (yellow card) 15'; Al-Ahmed 33'; Mahzari (yellow card) 45+4' (yellow-red card) 51'	Stadium: Prince Mohamed bin Fahd Stadium; Attendance: 5,158; Referee: Daniel Siebert (Germany)

17 January 2025 15	Al-Wehda	0–3	Al-Qadsiah	Mecca
18:40	Ighalo (yellow card) 30'; Al-Owaishir (yellow card) 66'	Report	Thakri (yellow card) 37'; Puertas 44'; Aubameyang 67'; Lajami (yellow card) 90+4'; Fernández 90+7'	Stadium: King Abdulaziz Sports City; Attendance: 1,126; Referee: Tamás Bognár (Hungary)

22 January 2025 16	Al-Orobah	0–2	Al-Qadsiah	Sakakah
17:00	Muhar (yellow card) 63'	Report	Aubameyang (yellow card) 24'; Quiñones 28', 31'; Al-Ammar (yellow card) 32'; Puertas (yellow card) 53'	Stadium: Al Jouf University Stadium; Attendance: 847; Referee: Cláudio Pereira (Portugal)

27 January 2025 17	Al-Qadsiah	2–1	Al-Hilal	Dammam
20:00	Aubameyang 2', 90+3'; Nández (yellow card) 31'	Report	Al-Tombakti (yellow card) 18'; Leonardo 50'; Al-Bulaihi (yellow card) 65'	Stadium: Prince Mohamed bin Fahd Stadium; Attendance: 17,402; Referee: Julian Weinberger (Austria)

1 February 2025 18	Al-Fateh	1–1	Al-Qadsiah	Al-Hasa
18:00	Al-Zarie (yellow card) 45'; Machado 47'	Report	Quiñones 2'	Stadium: Al-Fateh Club Stadium; Attendance: 10,629; Referee: Nazareno Arasa (Argentina)

6 February 2025 19	Al-Qadsiah	2–0	Al-Raed	Dammam
18:05	Aubameyang 45+3'; Álvarez (yellow card) 57'; Aboulshamat (yellow card) 64'; Al-Qahtani (yellow card) 68'; Quiñones 90+6'; Fernández (yellow card) 90+9'	Report	A. Hazazi (yellow card) 21' (yellow-red card) 48'; Al-Yousef (yellow card) 43'; Sunyur (yellow card) 74'; Abeid (yellow card) 90+2'; Bouzok (yellow card) 90+4'	Stadium: Prince Mohamed bin Fahd Stadium; Attendance: 3,296; Referee: Duje Strukan (Croatia)

13 February 2025 20	Al-Shabab	2–3	Al-Qadsiah	Riyadh
18:25	Guanca 16'; Camara 68'; Al Dubais (yellow card) 90+1'; Hamdallah (yellow card) 90+7'	Report	Nández (yellow card) 44'; Quiñones 49', 90+6', (yellow card) 90+8'; Asiri (yellow card) 56'; Aubameyang (red card) 79'; Hazazi 83'	Stadium: Al-Shabab Club Stadium; Attendance: 5,582; Referee: Alexis Herrera (Venezuela)

21 February 2025 21	Al-Qadsiah	2–0	Al-Okhdood	Dammam
18:10	Quiñones 31' (pen.); Al-Ammar 51'	Report	Al-Rubaie (yellow card) 48'	Stadium: Prince Mohamed bin Fahd Stadium; Attendance: 7,728; Referee: João Pinheiro (Portugal)

25 February 2025 22	Al-Ahli	4–1	Al-Qadsiah	Jeddah
20:30	Toney 11' (pen.), 52' (pen.); Sulaiman 27', (yellow card) 58'; Veiga (yellow card) 40'; Nacho 42' (o.g.)	Report	Álvarez (yellow card) 9'; Thakri (yellow card) 37'; Quiñones 48'; Nández (yellow card) 50'	Stadium: Alinma Stadium; Attendance: 21,775; Referee: Georgi Kabakov (Bulgaria)

2 March 2025 23	Al-Qadsiah	1–0	Al-Riyadh	Dammam
22:00	Álvarez (yellow card) 71'; Al-Othman 90+1'; Casteels (yellow card) 90+10'	Report	Konaté (yellow card) 34' (yellow-red card) 63'; Tozé (yellow card) 44'	Stadium: Prince Mohamed bin Fahd Stadium; Attendance: 4,048; Referee: Sergei Karasev (Russia)

6 March 2025 24	Al-Qadsiah	1–1	Al-Ittihad	Dammam
22:00	Aubameyang 90+1'	Report	Faqeehi (yellow card) 21'; Fabinho (yellow card) 59'; Kanté (yellow card) 90+6', (goal) 90+6'	Stadium: Prince Mohamed bin Fahd Stadium; Attendance: 20,115; Referee: Esteban Ostojich (Uruguay)

14 March 2025 25	Damac	1–0	Al-Qadsiah	Khamis Mushait
22:00	Al-Rashidi (yellow card) 90+7'; Diallo 90+11'	Report	Quiñones (yellow card) 81'; Nández (yellow card) 90+4'; Al-Ammar (yellow card) 90+7'; Al-Othman (yellow card) 90+10'	Stadium: Damac Club Stadium; Attendance: 3,087; Referee: Nenad Minaković (Serbia)

5 April 2025 26	Al-Qadsiah	1–1	Al-Ettifaq	Dammam
17:05	Aboulshamat 45'; Nández (yellow card) 45+2'; Hazazi (yellow card) 90'	Report	Medrán (yellow card) 27'; Hendry (yellow card) 45+6'; Hindi (yellow card) 55'; Wijnaldum 63'; Ali (yellow card) 90+3'	Stadium: Prince Mohamed bin Fahd Stadium; Attendance: 11,231; Referee: Mario Escobar (Guatemala)

12 April 2025 27	Al-Fayha	2–1	Al-Qadsiah	Buraidah
19:00	López 33', 58'; Vareta (yellow card) 45+2'	Report	Quiñones 90+2' (pen.)	Stadium: King Abdullah Sports City; Attendance: 589; Referee: Jesús Valenzuela (Venezuela)

18 April 2025 28	Al-Qadsiah	2–1	Al-Nassr	Dammam
21:00	Fernández (yellow card) 25'; Nacho (yellow card) 27'; Al-Ammar 35', (yellow card) 76'; Nández (yellow card) 39'; Álvarez (yellow card) 53'; Aboulshamat (yellow card) 75'; Aubameyang 87'	Report	Mané (yellow card) 30', (goal) 84'; Al-Ghannam (yellow card) 45+1'; Boushal (yellow card) 80'	Stadium: Prince Mohamed bin Fahd Stadium; Attendance: 17,368; Referee: Szymon Marciniak (Poland)

23 April 2025 29	Al-Khaleej	1–1	Al-Qadsiah	Dammam
21:00	Martins 45+3', (yellow card) 46'; Rebocho (yellow card) 67'; Nasser (yellow card) 82'; Aboulshamat (yellow card) 89'	Report	Al-Othman (yellow card) 67'; Quiñones 89'; Puertas (yellow card) 90+4'	Stadium: Prince Mohamed bin Fahd Stadium; Attendance: 2,084; Referee: István Kovács (Romania)

2 May 2025 30	Al-Qadsiah	4–1	Al-Kholood	Dammam
21:00	Aubameyang 13', 56'; Quiñones 27', 34'; Puertas (yellow card) 90+3'	Report	Hawsawi (yellow card) 38'; Collado (yellow card) 41'; H. Al-Shamrani (yellow card) 45+4'; Muleka 51' (pen.); F. Al-Shamrani (yellow card) 83'; Ambrose (yellow card) 90'	Stadium: Prince Mohamed bin Fahd Stadium; Attendance: 10,781; Referee: Andris Treimanis (Latvia)

11 May 2025 31	Al-Taawoun	0–1	Al-Qadsiah	Buraidah
19:15		Report	Girotto 61' (o.g.); Rashad (yellow card) 80'	Stadium: Al-Taawoun Club Stadium; Attendance: 2,087; Referee: Donatas Rumšas (Lithuania)

15 May 2025 32	Al-Qadsiah	3–1	Al-Wehda	Dammam
18:55	Puertas 43', 86'; Thakri (yellow card) 48'; Casteels (yellow card) 90+3'; Aubameyang 90+7'	Report	Al-Salem (yellow card) 18'; Ighalo 29'; Al Makahasi (yellow card) 81'	Stadium: Prince Mohamed bin Fahd Stadium; Attendance: 9,919; Referee: Georgi Kabakov (Bulgaria)

20 May 2025 33	Al-Qadsiah	3–1	Al-Orobah	Dammam
19:00	Aboulshamat (yellow card) 46'; Quiñones 65'; Aubameyang 77', 88'	Report	Al-Rashidi (yellow card) 41'; I. Al-Zubaidi (yellow card) 82'; Al Somah 90+4'; Al-Shuwaish (yellow card) 90+5'	Stadium: Prince Mohamed bin Fahd Stadium; Attendance: 10,984; Referee: Anastasios Sidiropoulos (Greece)

26 May 2025 34	Al-Hilal	2–0	Al-Qadsiah	Riyadh
21:00	Mitrović 25' (pen.); Milinković-Savić 69'; K. Al-Dawsari (yellow card) 72'	Report		Stadium: Kingdom Arena; Attendance: 20,883; Referee: Harm Osmers (Germany)

=== King's Cup ===
All times are local, AST (UTC+3).

22 September 2024 Round of 32	Al-Qadsiah	4–1	Al-Orobah	Dammam
21:00	Quiñones 10', 51'; Puertas 37'; Thakri (yellow card) 45+1'; Aubameyang 90+1'; Casteels (yellow card) 90+5'	Report	Kandouss (yellow card) 58'; F. Al-Zubaidi (yellow card) 84'; Guðmundsson 90+6' (pen.)	Stadium: Prince Mohamed bin Fahd Stadium; Referee: Mario Escobar (Guatemala)

28 October 2024 Round of 16	Al-Wehda	1–2	Al-Qadsiah	Mecca
20:30	Bacuna 7'; Al-Najei (yellow card) 90+1'; Al-Muwallad (yellow card) 90+2'	Report	Quiñones 37', 45+4'; Hazazi (yellow card) 79'	Stadium: King Abdulaziz Sports City; Referee: Sebastian Gishamer (Austria)

7 January 2025 Quarter-finals	Al-Taawoun	0–3	Al-Qadsiah	Buraidah
18:00	Al-Nasser (yellow card) 59'; Fajr (yellow card) 90+3'; Bahebri (yellow card) 90+5'	Report	Aubameyang 34'; Puertas 36'; Quiñones 49'; Nacho (yellow card) 90+6'	Stadium: Al-Raed Club Stadium; Attendance: 3,150; Referee: Radu Petrescu (Romania)

2 April 2025 Semi-finals	Al-Qadsiah	1–0	Al-Raed	Dammam
21:00	Álvarez (yellow card) 90+1'; Aubameyang 90+2'	Report	Al-Dossari (yellow card) 39'; Al-Jayzani (yellow card) 54'	Stadium: Prince Mohamed bin Fahd Stadium; Attendance: 10,074; Referee: Urs Schnyder (Switzerland)

30 May 2025 Final	Al-Ittihad	3–1	Al-Qadsiah	Jeddah
21:00	Benzema 34', 90+4'; Aouar 43'	Report	Aubameyang 45+6' (pen.); Fernández (yellow card) 65' (yellow-red card) 81'	Stadium: Alinma Stadium; Attendance: 51,331; Referee: Maurizio Mariani (Italy)

== Statistics ==
=== Appearances ===
Last updated on 30 May 2025.

No.	Pos	Nat	Player	Total		Pro League		King's Cup	
No.	Pos	Nat	Player	Apps	Goals	Apps	Goals	Apps	Goals
Goalkeepers
1	GK	(Belgium) BEL	Koen Casteels	37	0	33	0	4	0
25	GK	(Saudi Arabia) KSA	Abdulaziz Al-Awairdhi	0	0	0	0	0	0
28	GK	(Saudi Arabia) KSA	Ahmed Al-Kassar	2	0	1	0	1	0
Defenders
2	DF	(Saudi Arabia) KSA	Mohammed Aboulshamat	36	1	28+3	1	4+1	0
3	DF	(Saudi Arabia) KSA	Mohammed Saadoun	0	0	0	0	0	0
4	DF	(Saudi Arabia) KSA	Jehad Thakri	34	0	29+1	0	4	0
6	DF	(Spain) ESP	Nacho	36	0	31	0	5	0
13	DF	(Saudi Arabia) KSA	Ahmed Kaabi	0	0	0	0	0	0
17	DF	(Uruguay) URU	Gastón Álvarez	35	1	30	1	4+1	0
23	DF	(Saudi Arabia) KSA	Abdullah Hassoun	1	0	0+1	0	0	0
24	DF	(Saudi Arabia) KSA	Mohammed Qassem	26	0	2+22	0	1+1	0
49	DF	(Spain) ESP	Alejandro Vergaz	0	0	0	0	0	0
87	DF	(Saudi Arabia) KSA	Qassem Lajami	15	0	8+4	0	1+2	0
Midfielders
5	MF	(Argentina) ARG	Ezequiel Fernández	37	1	31+1	1	4+1	0
7	MF	(Saudi Arabia) KSA	Turki Al-Ammar	33	4	27+3	4	3	0
8	MF	(Uruguay) URU	Nahitan Nández	33	0	28	0	5	0
11	MF	(Saudi Arabia) KSA	Ali Hazazi	31	1	5+21	1	1+4	0
14	MF	(Saudi Arabia) KSA	Saif Rashad	13	0	0+12	0	0+1	0
15	MF	(Saudi Arabia) KSA	Hussain Al-Qahtani	28	0	6+19	0	1+2	0
39	MF	(Saudi Arabia) KSA	Abdulrahman Al-Dawsari	11	0	0+9	0	0+2	0
40	MF	(Saudi Arabia) KSA	Ibrahim Mahnashi	13	0	3+8	0	0+2	0
86	MF	(Saudi Arabia) KSA	Khalid Hazazi	0	0	0	0	0	0
88	MF	(Spain) ESP	Cameron Puertas	37	5	31+1	3	5	2
Forwards
9	FW	(Brazil) BRA	Guga	1	0	0+1	0	0	0
10	FW	(Gabon) GAB	Pierre-Emerick Aubameyang	36	21	32	17	4	4
18	FW	(Saudi Arabia) KSA	Haitham Asiri	12	0	2+9	0	1	0
30	FW	(Spain) ESP	Iker Almena	22	0	13+4	0	2+3	0
33	FW	(Mexico) MEX	Julián Quiñones	33	25	28	20	5	5
66	FW	(Saudi Arabia) KSA	Abdulaziz Al-Othman	29	4	6+20	4	0+3	0
Players sent out on loan this season
12	DF	(Saudi Arabia) KSA	Mohammed Al-Shanqiti	1	0	0+1	0	0	0
Player who made an appearance this season but have left the club
19	MF	(Peru) PER	André Carrillo	1	0	0+1	0	0	0
96	MF	(Saudi Arabia) KSA	Hussain Al-Nattar	1	0	0+1	0	0	0

=== Goalscorers ===
Rank	No.	Pos	Nat	Name	Pro League	King's Cup	Total
1	33	FW	(Mexico)	Julián Quiñones	20	5	25
2	10	FW	(Gabon)	Pierre-Emerick Aubameyang	17	4	21
3	88	MF	(Spain)	Cameron Puertas	3	2	5
4	7	MF	(Saudi Arabia)	Turki Al-Ammar	4	0	4
4	66	FW	(Saudi Arabia)	Abdulaziz Al-Othman	4	0	4
6	2	DF	(Saudi Arabia)	Mohammed Aboulshamat	1	0	1
6	5	MF	(Argentina)	Ezequiel Fernández	1	0	1
6	11	MF	(Saudi Arabia)	Ali Hazazi	1	0	1
6	17	DF	(Uruguay)	Gastón Álvarez	1	0	1
Own goal					1	0	1
Total					53	11	64

Last Updated: 30 May 2025

=== Assists ===
Rank	No.	Pos	Nat	Name	Pro League	King's Cup	Total
1	88	MF	(Spain)	Cameron Puertas	9	2	11
2	33	FW	(Mexico)	Julián Quiñones	5	3	8
3	2	DF	(Saudi Arabia)	Mohammed Aboulshamat	6	0	6
3	7	MF	(Saudi Arabia)	Turki Al-Ammar	6	0	6
5	8	MF	(Uruguay)	Nahitan Nández	5	0	5
6	5	MF	(Argentina)	Ezequiel Fernández	3	1	4
7	10	FW	(Gabon)	Pierre-Emerick Aubameyang	3	0	3
8	18	FW	(Saudi Arabia)	Haitham Asiri	0	2	2
9	6	DF	(Spain)	Nacho	1	0	1
9	15	MF	(Saudi Arabia)	Hussain Al-Qahtani	0	1	1
9	30	FW	(Spain)	Iker Almena	1	0	1
Total					39	9	48

Last Updated: 20 May 2025

=== Clean sheets ===
Rank	No.	Pos	Nat	Name	Pro League	King's Cup	Total
1	1	GK	(Belgium)	Koen Casteels	14	2	16
Total					14	2	16

Last Updated: 11 May 2025
