= Aaron Martin =

Aaron Martin may refer to:

- Aaron Martin (American football) (1941–2017), American football cornerback
- Aaron Martin (footballer, born 1989), English football defender for Port Vale
- Aaron Martin (footballer, born 1991), English football forward for Harrogate Town
- Aarón Martín (footballer, born 1997), Spanish football left-back for Genoa
- Aarón Martín (footballer, born 2006), Spanish football midfielder for Mirandés
