= Hubert Auer =

Hubert Auer may refer to:

- Hubert Auer (card game historian) (born c. 1950), Austrian card game historian
- Hubert Auer (footballer) (born 1981), Austrian footballer
