= Julián Quiñones =

Mexican footballer (born 1997)

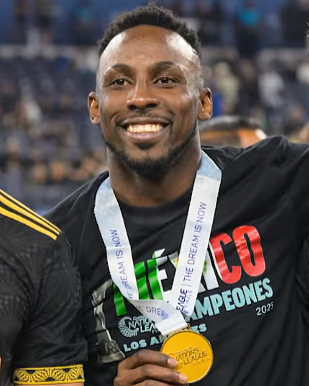
- Quiñones with Mexico in 2025

Personal information
- Full name: Julián Andrés Quiñones Quiñones
- Date of birth: 24 March 1997 (age 29)
- Place of birth: Magüí Payán, Nariño, Colombia
- Height: 1.80 m (5 ft 11 in)
- Positions: Forward; winger

Team information
- Current team: Al-Qadsiah
- Number: 33

Youth career
- –2015: Fútbol Paz
- 2015–2016: Tigres UANL

Senior career*
Years	Team	Apps	(Gls)
2016–2021	Tigres UANL	59	(8)
2016	→ Venados (loan)	14	(3)
2017–2018	→ Lobos BUAP (loan)	28	(17)
2021	→ Atlas (loan)	23	(5)
2022–2023	Atlas	55	(27)
2023–2024	América	41	(18)
2024–	Al-Qadsiah	70	(59)

International career^{‡}
2017–2018	Colombia U20	13	(4)
2023–	Mexico	29	(7)
Medal record
Men's football
Representing Mexico
CONCACAF Gold Cup
Winner	2025 United States–Canada
CONCACAF Nations League
Winner	2025 United States
Runner-up	2024 United States
Representing Colombia
Central American and Caribbean Games
Gold medal – first place	2018 Barranquilla	Team
- * Club domestic league appearances and goals as of 22:38, 29 October 2026 (UTC) ‡ National team caps and goals as of 17 November 2026

Julián Andrés Quiñones Quiñones (born 24 March 1997) is a professional footballer who plays as a forward or winger for Saudi Pro League club Al-Qadsiah. Born in Colombia, he represents the Mexico national team.

== Club career ==
=== Early career ===
Quiñones commenced his career in Cali, Colombia with local academy Futbol Paz. In the 2014–15 season, he netted 50 goals across 38 matches, prompting Tigres UANL to recruit him for their under-20 team.

In the Clausura 2016 tournament, Quiñones was sent on loan to Venados, an Ascenso MX club. He made his professional debut on 19 January 2016, scoring twice against Cruz Azul in a Copa MX match.

In June 2017, Quiñones joined Lobos BUAP on loan. In the Apertura 2017, he emerged as the third-highest scorer, finishing with nine goals. His impressive performance carried over into the Clausura 2018, where he scored another eight goals.

Quiñones returned to Tigres UANL ahead of the Apertura 2018, but despite his form with Lobos BUAP, head coach Ricardo Ferretti kept him on the fringes of the squad.

=== Atlas ===
In June 2021, Quiñones joined Atlas on a one-year loan. Six months later, the move became permanent after Atlas acquired the player. Quiñones won two consecutive league titles with Atlas, putting an end to the club's 70-year drought.

=== América ===
In July 2023, América reached an agreement to sign Quiñones. During his brief spell at the club, he secured two league titles, bringing his individual total to six.

=== Al-Qadsiah ===
In June 2024, Quiñones joined Saudi Pro League club Al-Qadsiah for a reported fee of US$16 million. He finished the 2024–25 season with 20 goals.

On 21 May 2026, he scored a hat-trick in a 5–1 away victory over Al-Ittihad, finishing the 2025–26 season as the league's top scorer with 33 goals, overtaking Ivan Toney on the final day of the campaign. On 25 May, Quiñones renewed his contract with the club until 2029.

In late 2026, Quiñones made the Ballon d'Or's top thirty shortlist, ultimately ranking 28th.

== International career ==
=== Colombia ===
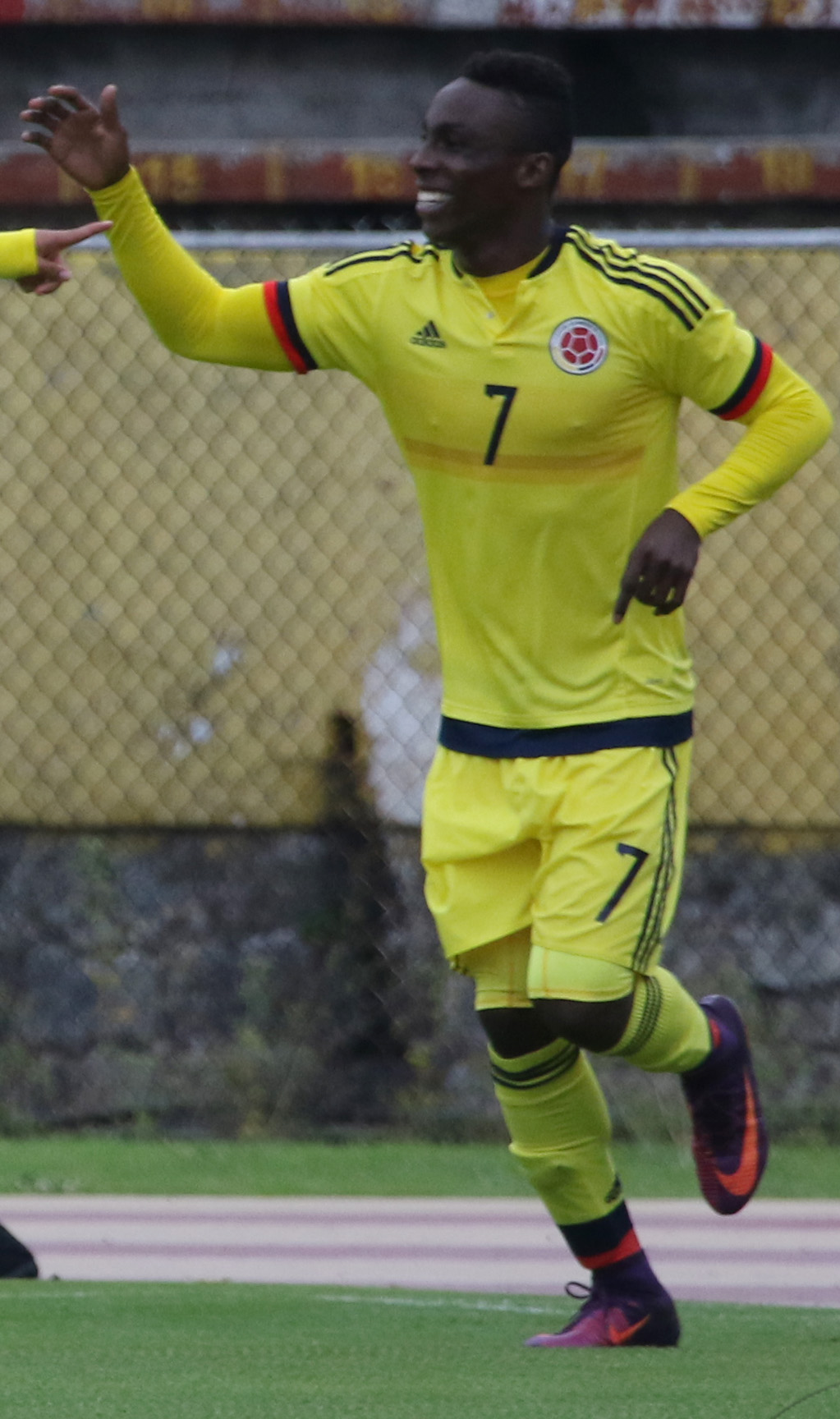
Quiñones playing for Colombia U20 in 2017

Quiñones represented Colombia in youth competitions, first at the 2017 South American U-20 Championship and then at the 2018 Central American and Caribbean Games. However, in May 2023, he opted not to accept a call-up to the senior Colombia national team after living in Mexico since the age of 17.

=== Mexico ===
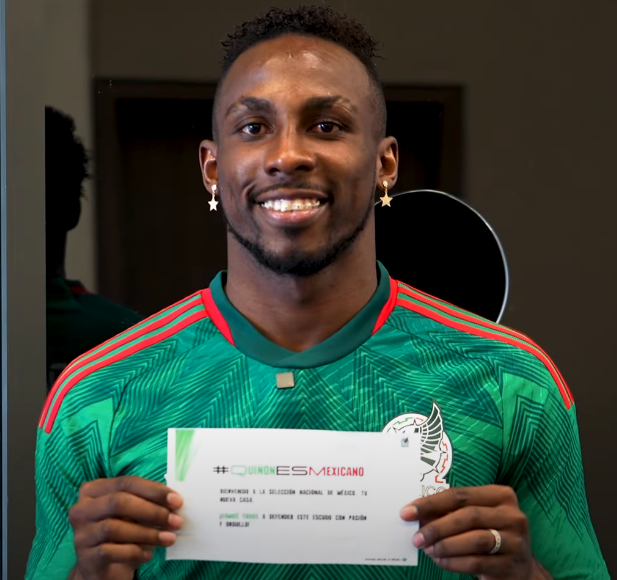
Quiñones in 2023

In September 2023, Quiñones joined the training camp of the Mexico national team, having previously declared his intention to represent the country. He completed his naturalization process in October and received his first call-up the following month. Quiñones made his debut in a CONCACAF Nations League match against Honduras on 17 November. He scored his first goal on 21 March 2024 in a semi-final match of the CONCACAF Nations League against Panama, scoring the 2nd goal of the game in the 43rd minute. Mexico went on to win the match 3–0.

Quiñones was named in the 26-man squad for the 2026 FIFA World Cup, co-hosted on home soil. On 11 June 2026, Quiñones scored the opening goal of the tournament in a 2–0 victory against South Africa. After the game, he was named Man of the Match. In the round of 32 against Ecuador, he scored the opening goal and was named Man of the Match as his team secured a 2–0 victory to advance to the round of 16. Mexico would then face England in the round of 16 where he scored in a 2–3 defeat. Thus, he scored his fourth goal of the World Cup tournament, equaling the record set by Mexican players Luis Hernández and Javier Hernández.

== Personal life ==
Born in Magüí Payán, Nariño, Quiñones is of Afro-Colombian descent. He had a childhood affected by poverty, to the extent that he had to take a three-hour boat ride to access a telephone. He received Mexican citizenship in 2023. Quiñones is married to Mexican model and influencer Ana Gabriela Amato. The couple began dating in 2022 and got married in December of the same year. Their daughter Alanna was born on December 26, 2023.

== Career statistics ==
=== Club ===
As of match played on 20 October 2026

Appearances and goals by club, season and competition
Club	Season	League			National cup (Note: Includes Copa MX, King's Cup)		Continental		Other		Total	
Club	Season	Division	Apps	Goals	Apps	Goals	Apps	Goals	Apps	Goals	Apps	Goals
Venados (loan)	2015–16	Ascenso MX	14	3	6	3	—		—		20	6
Tigres UANL	2016–17	Liga MX	7	0	0	0	3 (Note: Appearances in CONCACAF Champions Cup)	1	—		10	1
Tigres UANL	2018–19	Liga MX	25	6	4	1	6	2	—		35	9
Tigres UANL	2019–20	Liga MX	4	0	—		2	0	—		6	0
Tigres UANL	2020–21	Liga MX	23	2	—		—		1 (Note: Appearance in FIFA Club World Cup)	0	24	2
Tigres UANL	Total		59	8	4	1	11	3	1	0	75	12
BUAP (loan)	2017–18	Liga MX	28	17	0	0	—		—		28	17
Atlas	2021–22	Liga MX	43	14	—		—		1 (Note: Appearance in Supercopa MX)	1	44	15
Atlas	2022–23	Liga MX	35	18	—		3	3	1 (Note: Appearance in Campeones Cup)	0	39	21
Atlas	Total		78	32	0	0	3	3	2	1	83	36
América	2023–24	Liga MX	41	18	—		7	3	4 (Note: Appearances in Leagues Cup)	2	52	23
Al-Qadsiah	2024–25	Saudi Pro League	28	20	5	5	—		—		33	25
Al-Qadsiah	2025–26	Saudi Pro League	31	33	3	4	—		1 (Note: Appearance in Saudi Super Cup)	0	35	37
Al-Qadsiah	2026–27	Saudi Pro League	9	4	1	0	2 (Note: Appearances in AFC Champions League Elite)	1	0	0	12	5
Al-Qadsiah	Total		68	57	9	9	2	1	1	0	80	67
Career total			287	133	19	13	23	10	8	3	337	159

=== International ===
As of match played on 17 November 2026

Appearances and goals by national team and year
National team	Year	Apps	Goals
Mexico	2023	2	0
Mexico	2024	8	2
Mexico	2025	8	0
Mexico	2026	11	5
Total		29	7

Scores and results list Mexico's goal tally first, score column indicates score after each Quiñones goal.

List of international goals scored by Julián Quiñones
No.	Date	Venue	Cap	Opponent	Score	Result	Competition	Ref.
1	21 March 2024	AT&T Stadium, Arlington, United States	3	Panama	2–0	3–0	2024 CONCACAF Nations League Finals	
2	8 June 2024	Kyle Field, College Station, United States	5	Brazil	1–2	2–3	Friendly	
3	11 June 2026	Estadio Azteca, Mexico City, Mexico	23	South Africa	1–0	2–0	2026 FIFA World Cup	
4	24 June 2026	Estadio Azteca, Mexico City, Mexico	25	Czech Republic	2–0	3–0	2026 FIFA World Cup	
5	30 June 2026	Estadio Azteca, Mexico City, Mexico	26	Ecuador	1–0	2–0	2026 FIFA World Cup	
6	5 July 2026	Estadio Azteca, Mexico City, Mexico	27	England	1–2	2–3	2026 FIFA World Cup	
7	14 November 2026	Independence Park, Kingston, Jamaica	28	Jamaica	3–2	3–2	2026–27 CONCACAF Nations League	

== Honours ==
Tigres UANL

- Liga MX: Apertura 2016, Clausura 2019
- CONCACAF Champions League: 2020

Atlas

- Liga MX: Apertura 2021, Clausura 2022
- Campeón de Campeones: 2022

América

- Liga MX: Apertura 2023, Clausura 2024
- Campeón de Campeones: 2024

Colombia U20

- Central American and Caribbean Games: 2018

Mexico

- CONCACAF Gold Cup: 2025
- CONCACAF Nations League: 2024–25

Individual

- Central American and Caribbean Games Top Scorer: 2018
- Liga MX Best XI: Clausura 2022
- Liga MX Best Offensive Midfielder: 2021–22
- Liga MX All-Star: 2022
- King's Cup Top Scorer: 2024–25
- Saudi Pro League Golden Boot: 2025–26
- Ballon d'Or Nominee: 2026

Sporting positions
Preceded by Enner Valencia	FIFA World Cup opening goal 2026	Succeeded by Incumbent
