= Gastón Álvarez =

Uruguayan footballer (born 2000)

Personal information
- Full name: Pedro Gastón Álvarez Sosa
- Date of birth: 24 March 2000 (age 26)
- Place of birth: Melo, Uruguay
- Height: 1.84 m (6 ft 0 in)
- Positions: Centre-back; left-back

Team information
- Current team: Al-Qadsiah
- Number: 17

Youth career
- Boca Juniors Melo
- Cerro Largo
- Defensor Sporting

Senior career*
| Years | Team | Apps | (Gls) |
| 2019–2021 | Defensor Sporting | 33 | (2) |
| 2021–2023 | Boston River | 19 | (2) |
| 2022–2023 | → Getafe (loan) | 22 | (2) |
| 2023–2024 | Getafe | 34 | (2) |
| 2024– | Al-Qadsiah | 69 | (1) |

International career
| 2017 | Uruguay U18 | 3 | (0) |
| 2018 | Uruguay U20 | 10 | (0) |
| 2019 | Uruguay U22 | 5 | (0) |
Medal record
Men's football
Representing Uruguay
South American Games
| Silver medal – second place | 2018 Cochabamba | Team |
- * Club domestic league appearances and goals as of 23 October 2026

Pedro Gastón Álvarez Sosa (born 24 March 2000) is a Uruguayan professional footballer who plays as a centre-back or left-back for Saudi Pro League club Al-Qadsiah.

== Club career ==
Álvarez made his professional debut on 31 March 2019, playing the whole 90 minutes in a 4–2 league defeat against Racing Montevideo. He scored his first professional goal on 11 May 2019, netting the equalizer in a 1–1 draw against River Plate Montevideo.

Álvarez joined Boston River in April 2021 following Defensor's relegation to Segunda División. On 28 January of the following year, he moved abroad and joined Spanish La Liga side Getafe CF on loan until June 2023.

On 19 August 2024, Álvarez move to Saudi Pro League side Al-Qadsiah in a 4-year package worth €12 million.

== International career ==
Álvarez has represented Uruguay at multiple youth levels. In June 2019, he was named in Uruguay's 18-man squad for the 2019 Pan American Games.

On 21 October 2022, Álvarez was named in Uruguay's 55-man preliminary squad for the 2022 FIFA World Cup. However, he was not included in the final squad, which was announced three weeks later.

== Career statistics ==
As of match played 23 October 2026

Appearances and goals by club, season and competition
| Club | Season | League | | | National cup (Note: Includes Copa Uruguay, Copa del Rey, King's Cup) | | Continental | | Other | | Total | |
| Club | Season | Division | Apps | Goals | Apps | Goals | Apps | Goals | Apps | Goals | Apps | Goals |
|---|---|---|---|---|---|---|---|---|---|---|---|---|
| Defensor Sporting | 2019 | UPD | 25 | 2 | — | | — | | — | | 25 | 2 |
| Defensor Sporting | 2020 | UPD | 8 | 0 | — | | — | | — | | 8 | 0 |
| Defensor Sporting | Total | | 33 | 2 | 0 | 0 | 0 | 0 | 0 | 0 | 33 | 2 |
| Boston River | 2021 | UPD | 19 | 2 | — | | — | | — | | 19 | 2 |
| Boston River | 2022 | UPD | 0 | 0 | 0 | 0 | — | | — | | 0 | 0 |
| Boston River | 2023 | UPD | 0 | 0 | 0 | 0 | 0 | 0 | — | | 0 | 0 |
| Boston River | Total | | 19 | 2 | 0 | 0 | 0 | 0 | 0 | 0 | 19 | 2 |
| Getafe (loan) | 2021–22 | La Liga | 0 | 0 | 0 | 0 | — | | — | | 0 | 0 |
| Getafe (loan) | 2022–23 | La Liga | 22 | 2 | 3 | 0 | — | | — | | 25 | 2 |
| Getafe | 2023–24 | La Liga | 34 | 2 | 3 | 0 | — | | — | | 37 | 2 |
| Getafe | Total | | 56 | 4 | 6 | 0 | 0 | 0 | 0 | 0 | 62 | 4 |
| Al-Qadsiah | 2024–25 | Saudi Pro League | 30 | 1 | 5 | 0 | — | | — | | 35 | 1 |
| Al-Qadsiah | 2025–26 | Saudi Pro League | 28 | 0 | 3 | 0 | — | | 1 (Note: Appearance in Saudi Super Cup) | 1 | 32 | 1 |
| Al-Qadsiah | 2026–27 | Saudi Pro League | 11 | 0 | 1 | 1 | 2 (Note: Appearances in AFC Champions League Elite) | 0 | 0 | 0 | 14 | 1 |
| Al-Qadsiah | Total | | 69 | 1 | 9 | 1 | 2 | 0 | 1 | 1 | 81 | 3 |
| Career total | | | 177 | 9 | 15 | 1 | 2 | 0 | 1 | 1 | 195 | 11 |

== Honours ==
Uruguay U20

- South American Games silver medal: 2018
