= Gabriel Carvalho =

Brazilian footballer

Personal information
- Full name: Gabriel Carvalho Teixeira
- Date of birth: 17 August 2007 (age 19)
- Place of birth: Porto Alegre, Brazil
- Height: 1.70 m (5 ft 7 in)
- Positions: Right winger; forward

Team information
- Current team: Shakhtar Donetsk (on loan from Al Qadsiah)
- Number: 25

Youth career
- 2017–2024: Internacional

Senior career*
Years	Team	Apps	(Gls)
2024–2025	Internacional	27	(1)
2025–	Al Qadsiah	10	(1)
2026–	→ Shakhtar Donetsk (loan)	2	(0)

International career^{‡}
2026–	Brazil U20	3	(0)
- * Club domestic league appearances and goals as of 19:02, 14 September 2026 (UTC) ‡ National team caps and goals as of 03:13, 11 June 2026 (UTC)

Gabriel Carvalho Teixeira (born 17 August 2007), known as Gabriel Carvalho, is a Brazilian professional footballer who plays as a right winger or forward for Ukrainian Premier League club Shakhtar Donetsk on loan from Saudi Premier League club Al Qadsiah.

== Club career ==
=== Internacional ===
Born in Porto Alegre, Rio Grande do Sul, Gabriel Carvalho joined Internacional's youth setup at the age of nine. On 25 August 2023, he signed his first professional contract with the club, after agreeing to a three-year deal.

Gabriel Carvalho made his first team – and Série A – debut on 16 June 2024, coming on as a second-half substitute for Hyoran and providing an assist to Wesley's equalizer in a 2–1 away loss to Vitória; aged 16 years, 9 months and 30 days, he became the youngest player to debut for the club in the 21st century, surpassing Alexandre Pato. On 23 July, he further extended his link with the Colorado, signing a contract until December 2028 and having an € 60 million release clause.

Gabriel Carvalho scored his first professional goal on 1 September 2024, netting Inter's second in a 3–1 away win over Juventude. He became as a first-choice at Roger Machado's side after the injury of Alan Patrick, but remained a starter after the captain's return, and finished the season with one goal and two assists in 26 matches.

=== Al Qadsiah ===
On 28 December 2024, Internacional negotiated with Al Qadsiah for the transfer of Gabriel Carvalho for an amount of US$ 16 million plus bonuses. He joined the Saudi club in August 2025, after his 18th birthday.

==== Loan to Shakhtar Donetsk ====
On 20 August 2026, Ukrainian Premier League club Shakhtar Donetsk announced the season-long loan signing of Carvalho from Al Qadsiah, with the option to make the move permanent.

== Career statistics ==
As of 17 September 2026

Appearances and goals by club, season and competition
Club	Season	League			Cup (Note: Includes Copa do Brasil, King's Cup)		Continental		Other		Total	
Club	Season	Division	Apps	Goals	Apps	Goals	Apps	Goals	Apps	Goals	Apps	Goals
Internacional	2024	Série A	24	1	1	0	1 (Note: Appearance in Copa Sudamericana)	0	—		26	1
Internacional	2025	Série A	3	0	0	0	1 (Note: Appearance in Copa Libertadores)	0	—		4	0
Internacional	Total		27	1	1	0	2	0	—		30	1
Al Qadsiah	2025–26	Saudi Pro League	10	1	2	0	—		1 (Note: Appearance in Saudi Super Cup)	0	13	1
Shakhtar Donetsk	2026–27	Ukrainian Premier League	2	0	1	1	0	0	—		3	1
Career total			39	2	5	1	2	0	1	0	46	3
