= Saif Rajab =

Saudi Arabian footballer (born 2004)

Personal information
- Full name: Saif Rashad Mohamed Rajab
- Date of birth: 31 October 2004 (age 21)
- Place of birth: Jeddah, Saudi Arabia
- Height: 1.78 m (5 ft 10 in)
- Position: Winger

Team information
- Current team: Al-Taawoun
- Number: 74

Youth career
- –2022: Al-Ahli
- 2022–2023: Jeddah

Senior career*
Years	Team	Apps	(Gls)
2023–2024	Jeddah	4	(0)
2024–2026	Al-Qadsiah	15	(0)
2026–	Al-Taawoun	0	(0)

International career
2025–	Saudi Arabia U23	2	(0)
- * Club domestic league appearances and goals

Saif Rajab (Arabic: سيف رجب; born 31 October 2004) is a Saudi Arabian professional football player who plays as a Winger for Al-Taawoun and the Saudi Arabia U23.

== Club career ==
Saif Rajab started his career at the youth academy of Al-Ahli. On 1 July 2022, Said Rajab joined the youth teams of Jeddah. On 5 February 2024, Saif Rajab joined Al-Qadsiah. On 29 August 2024, renewed his contract with club for five-years. On 3 February 2026, Rajab joined Al-Taawoun.

== International career ==
He was called up to the Saudi Arabia U23 to participate in 2025 Maurice Revello Tournament.
