= Cameron Puertas =

Spanish footballer (born 1998)

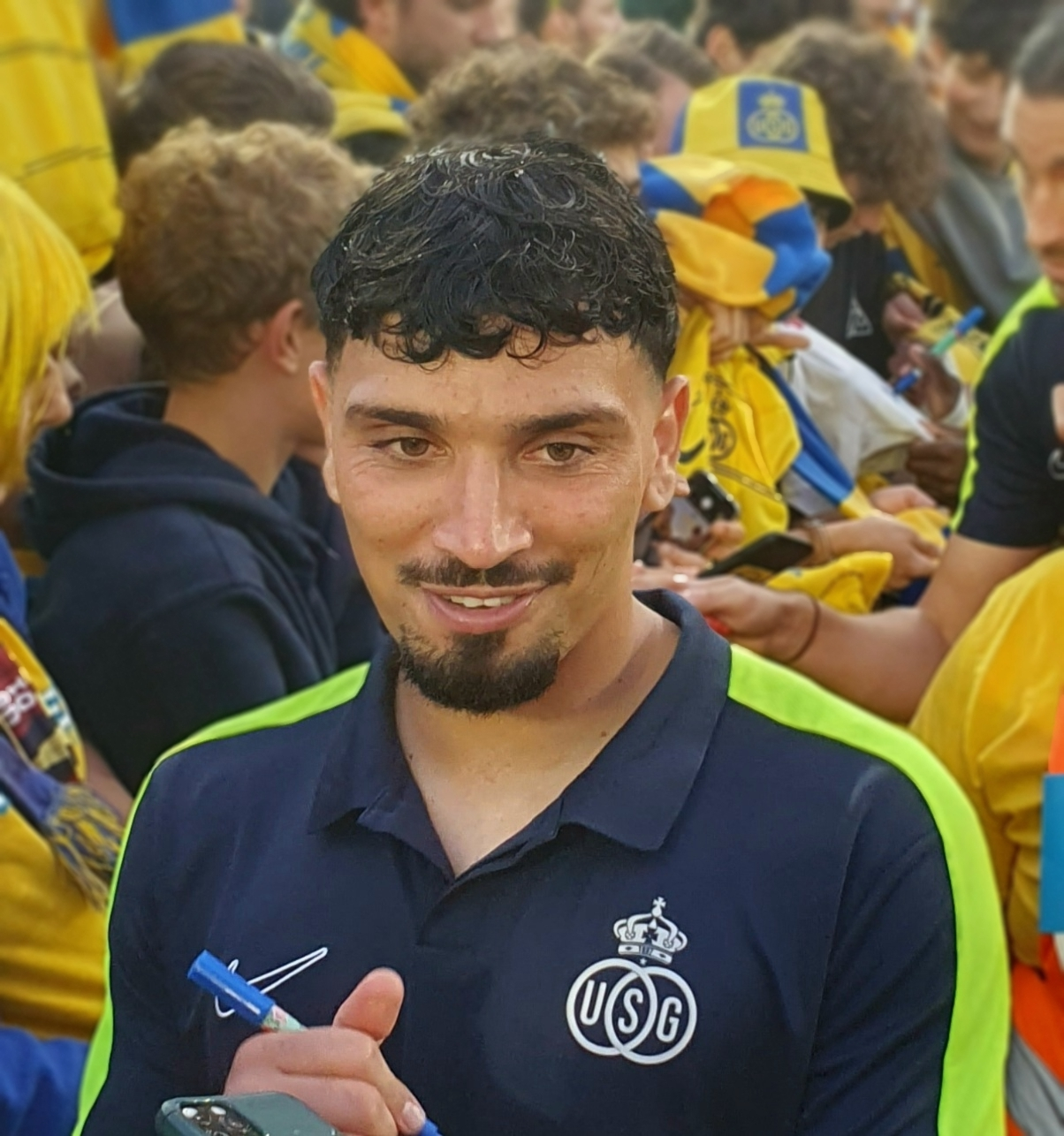
- Puertas with Union SG in 2024

Personal information
- Full name: Cameron Mitchel Puertas Castro
- Date of birth: 18 August 1998 (age 28)
- Place of birth: Lausanne, Switzerland
- Height: 1.78 m (5 ft 10 in)
- Position: Attacking midfielder

Team information
- Current team: Al-Wasl (on loan from Al Qadsiah)
- Number: 21

Youth career
- Renens
- Forward Morges

Senior career*
Years	Team	Apps	(Gls)
2017–2022	Lausanne-Sport	94	(10)
2022–2024	Union SG	86	(17)
2024–	Al-Qadsiah	32	(3)
2025–2026	→ Werder Bremen (loan)	29	(1)
2026–	→ Al-Wasl (loan)	0	(0)
- * Club domestic league appearances and goals as of 17:28, 16 May 2026 (UTC)

Cameron Mitchel Puertas Castro (born 18 August 1998) is a professional footballer who plays as a midfielder for Al-Wasl on loan from Saudi Pro League club Al-Qadsiah. Born in Switzerland, he is a citizen of Spain.

== Career ==
Puertas started his career with Swiss amateur club Renens, before joining Forward-Morges in the fifth division at the age of 16, where he was soon considered to be the best player in the regional group.

In 2020, he made first appearance in the Swiss Super League with Lausanne-Sport.

On 22 January 2022, Puertas signed a 3.5-year contract with Union SG in Belgium.

On 26 August 2024, Puertas signed with Al-Qadsiah in Saudi Arabia.

Puertas joined Bundesliga club Werder Bremen on loan in September 2025. While the move was agreed on 1 September, the last day of the summer transfer window, it was announced on 4 September upon Al-Qadsiah's request. The loan agreement includes an option for Bremen to sign Puertas permanently.

== Personal life ==
While being born and raised in Switzerland, Puertas only holds Spanish citizenship, inherited from his parents. He was about to become a Swiss national in 2021, but the naturalisation process has been halted after he drove without a license. He will not receive his Swiss passport until 2025 at the earliest.

== Career statistics ==
As of match played 16 May 2026

Appearances and goals by club, season and competition
Club	Season	League			National cup (Note: Includes Swiss Cup, Belgian Cup, King's Cup)		Continental		Other		Total	
Club	Season	Division	Apps	Goals	Apps	Goals	Apps	Goals	Apps	Goals	Apps	Goals
Lausanne-Sport	2018–19	Swiss Challenge League	19	2	—		—		—		19	2
Lausanne-Sport	2019–20	Swiss Challenge League	26	1	3	0	—		—		29	1
Lausanne-Sport	2020–21	Swiss Super League	33	5	2	0	—		—		35	5
Lausanne-Sport	2021–22	Swiss Super League	16	2	2	1	—		—		18	1
Lausanne-Sport	Total		94	10	7	1	—		—		101	11
Union SG	2021–22	Belgian Pro League	9	0	—		—		—		9	0
Union SG	2022–23	Belgian Pro League	34	5	4	1	9 (Note: Two appearances in UEFA Champions League, seven appearances in UEFA Europa League)	0	—		47	6
Union SG	2023–24	Belgian Pro League	40	11	4	0	12 (Note: Eight appearances and two goals inUEFA Europa League, four appearances and one goal in UEFA Europa Conference League)	3	—		56	14
Union SG	2024–25	Belgian Pro League	3	1	—		2 (Note: Appearances in UEFA Champions League)	0	1 (Note: Appearance in Belgian Super Cup)	0	6	1
Union SG	Total		86	17	8	1	23	3	1	0	118	21
Al-Qadsiah	2024–25	Saudi Pro League	32	3	5	2	—		1	0	38	5
Werder Bremen (loan)	2025–26	Bundesliga	29	1	0	0	—		0	0	29	1
Career total			241	31	20	4	23	3	2	0	286	38

== Honours ==
Royale Union Saint-Gilloise

- Belgian Cup: 2023–24

Individual

- Pro League Awards Player of the Season: 2023–24
- Belgian Silver Shoe: 2023, 2024
