= Nahitan Nández =

Uruguayan footballer (born 1995)

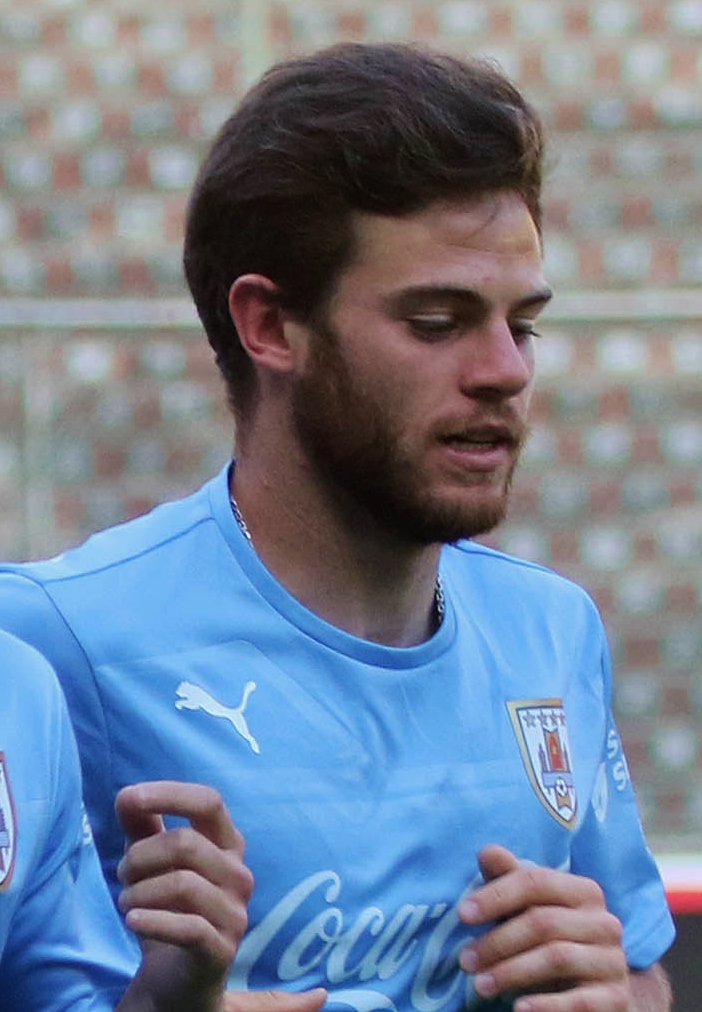
- Nández training with Uruguay in 2018

Personal information
- Full name: Nahitan Michel Nández Acosta
- Date of birth: 28 December 1995 (age 30)
- Place of birth: Punta del Este, Uruguay
- Height: 1.72 m (5 ft 8 in)
- Positions: Midfielder; right-back; winger

Team information
- Current team: Al-Qadsiah
- Number: 8

Youth career
- 2013–2014: Peñarol

Senior career*
Years	Team	Apps	(Gls)
2014–2017	Peñarol	75	(8)
2017–2019	Boca Juniors	36	(6)
2019–2024	Cagliari	158	(6)
2024–	Al-Qadsiah	62	(8)

International career^{‡}
2014–2015	Uruguay U20	28	(1)
2015–	Uruguay	74	(0)
Medal record
Men's football
Representing Uruguay
Copa América
Third place	2024 United States
- * Club domestic league appearances and goals as of 11 September 2026 ‡ National team caps and goals as of 6 October 2026

Nahitan Michel Nández Acosta (born 28 December 1995) is a Uruguayan professional footballer who plays for Saudi Pro League club Al-Qadsiah and the Uruguay national team. A versatile player, Nández can play as a central midfielder, right-back, attacking midfielder or winger.

After starting his career at Peñarol, Nández later played in Argentina for Boca Juniors and in Italy for Cagliari. A full international for Uruguay since 2015, he played at the 2018 FIFA World Cup and three editions of the Copa América (2019, 2021 and 2024).

== Club career ==
Born in Punta del Este, Nández is a youth exponent from Peñarol. On 1 March 2014, he made his first team debut in a Uruguayan Primera División game against Danubio, replacing Antonio Pacheco D'Agosti after 57 minutes in a 0–2 away win.

On 23 August 2017, Nández moved to Argentina's Boca Juniors on a four-year deal, with the club paying US$4 million for 60% of his economic rights.

He made his last appearance for Boca Juniors on 31 July 2019 against Club Athletico Paranaense in a 2–0 home win. He was replaced by Eduardo Salvio in the 75th minute.

On 9 August 2019, Nández joined Italian club Cagliari Calcio on a five-year deal, for a fee of US$20 million.

On 24 May 2024, it was reported that Nández would join the recently promoted Saudi Pro League side Al Qadsiah as a free agent.

== International career ==
Nández was the captain and a key member of the Uruguayan team at the 2015 FIFA U-20 World Cup played in New Zealand, where he was in the starting eleven for all four of their games.

Nández made his senior international debut on 8 September 2015, in a 1–0 friendly loss away to Costa Rica at the Estadio Nacional; he replaced Diego Rolan in the 37th minute.

In June 2018 he was named in Uruguay's 23-man squad for the 2018 FIFA World Cup in Russia. He played in all five of their games as they reached the quarter-finals, starting all but one.

Nández was also called up by manager Óscar Tabárez for the 2019 Copa América in Brazil.

== Career statistics ==
=== Club ===
As of match played 16 January 2025

Appearances and goals by club, season and competition
Club	Season	League			National cup		Continental		Other		Total	
Club	Season	Division	Apps	Goals	Apps	Goals	Apps	Goals	Apps	Goals	Apps	Goals
Peñarol	2013–14	Uruguayan Primera División	5	0	—		1	0	—		6	0
Peñarol	2014–15	Uruguayan Primera División	10	0	—		—		—		10	0
Peñarol	2015–16	Uruguayan Primera División	28	1	—		5	0	—		33	1
Peñarol	2016	Uruguayan Primera División	12	0	—		1	0	—		13	0
Peñarol	2017	Uruguayan Primera División	20	7	—		4	0	—		24	7
Peñarol	Total		75	8	—		11	0	—		86	8
Boca Juniors	2017–18	Argentine Primera División	24	4	2	0	11	2	1	0	38	6
Boca Juniors	2018–19	Argentine Primera División	12	2	8	0	8	0	1	0	29	2
Boca Juniors	Total		36	6	10	0	19	2	2	0	67	8
Cagliari	2019–20	Serie A	35	2	3	0	—		—		38	2
Cagliari	2020–21	Serie A	32	2	2	0	—		—		34	2
Cagliari	2021–22	Serie A	21	0	1	0	—		—		22	0
Cagliari	2022–23	Serie B	37	0	0	0	—		—		37	0
Cagliari	2023–24	Serie A	33	2	1	0	—		—		34	2
Cagliari	Total		158	6	7	0	—		—		165	6
Al-Qadsiah	2024–25	Saudi Pro League	13	0	3	0	—		—		16	0
Career total			274	20	20	0	30	2	2	0	326	22

=== International ===
As of match played 6 October 2026

Appearances and goals by national team and year
National team	Year	Apps	Goals
Uruguay	2015	3	0
Uruguay	2017	6	0
Uruguay	2018	11	0
Uruguay	2019	11	0
Uruguay	2020	4	0
Uruguay	2021	14	0
Uruguay	2023	4	0
Uruguay	2024	12 (Note: Includes a Non-FIFA friendly played against the Basque Country, which is counted as an official match by the Uruguayan Football Association.)	0
Uruguay	2025	7	0
Uruguay	2026	2	0
Total		74	0

== Honours ==
Peñarol

- Uruguayan Primera División: 2015–16

Boca Juniors

- Argentine Primera División: 2017–18
- Supercopa Argentina: 2018

Uruguay

- Copa América third place: 2024
