= Abdulaziz Al-Othman =

Saudi Arabian footballer

Personal information
- Full name: Abdulaziz Jamal Al-Othman
- Date of birth: 31 January 2004 (age 22)
- Place of birth: Saudi Arabia
- Position: Centre-forward

Team information
- Current team: Neom
- Number: 9

Youth career
- –2022: Al-Qadsiah

Senior career*
Years	Team	Apps	(Gls)
2022–2026	Al-Qadsiah	54	(7)
2025–2026	→ Al-Shabab (loan)	10	(1)
2026–	Neom	1	(0)

International career^{‡}
2024–	Saudi Arabia U23	8	(3)
2024–	Saudi Arabia	1	(0)
- * Club domestic league appearances and goals as of 5 November 2026 ‡ National team caps and goals as of 9 October 2025 (UTC)

Abdulaziz Jamal Al-Othman (Arabic: عبد العزيز جمال العثمان; born 31 January 2004) is a Saudi Arabian footballer who plays as a centre-forward for Neom and the Saudi Arabia national team.

== Club career ==
Al-Othman started his career at the youth teams of Al-Qadsiah. On 10 January 2022, he signed his first professional contract with Al-Qadsiah. On 16 January 2024, Al-Othman renewed his contract with Al-Qadsiah. On 11 September 2025, Al-Othman joined Al-Shabab on loan.
