= Aarón Martín (footballer, born 2006) =

Spanish footballer

Personal information
- Full name: Aarón Martín Luis
- Date of birth: 24 November 2006 (age 19)
- Place of birth: La Orotava, Spain
- Height: 1.75 m (5 ft 9 in)
- Position: Midfielder

Team information
- Current team: Kalamata
- Number: 5

Youth career
- Orotava
- Atlético Barranco Hondo
- Florida
- Tenerife

Senior career*
Years	Team	Apps	(Gls)
2024–2025	Tenerife B	3	(0)
2024–2025	Tenerife	14	(1)
2025–2026	Al Qadsiah	0	(0)
2025	→ Tenerife (loan)	14	(1)
2025–2026	→ Mirandés (loan)	18	(0)
2026–	Kalamata	1	(0)

International career
2025–2026	Spain U19	2	(0)
- * Club domestic league appearances and goals as of 29 August 2026

Aarón Martín Luis (born 24 November 2006) is a Spanish footballer who plays as a midfielder for Greek club Kalamata.

== Career ==
Born in La Orotava, Santa Cruz de Tenerife, Canary Islands, Martín represented Orotova, Atlético Barranco Hondo, Florida and Tenerife as a youth. He made his senior debut with the reserves on 25 February 2024, coming on as a second-half substitute in a 6–1 Tercera Federación home routing of Unión Puerto.

Martín made his first team debut on 29 September 2024, replacing Sergio González late into a 2–1 Segunda División away loss to Castellón. He scored his first professional goal on 11 October, netting the opener in a 3–2 home loss to Real Zaragoza.

On 3 February 2025, Martín was transferred to Saudi club Al Qadsiah, being immediately loaned back to Tenerife for the remainder of the 2024–25 season. On 4 August, after suffering relegation, he moved to fellow second division side Mirandés on a one-year loan deal.
