= Meshari Sunyur =

Saudi Arabian footballer

Personal information
- Full name: Meshari Abdulaziz Amin Sunyur
- Date of birth: 5 December 2001 (age 24)
- Place of birth: Saudi Arabia
- Height: 1.75 m (5 ft 9 in)
- Position: Goalkeeper

Team information
- Current team: Al-Qadsiah
- Number: 50

Youth career
- –2021: Al-Raed

Senior career*
| Years | Team | Apps | (Gls) |
| 2021–2025 | Al-Raed | 20 | (0) |
| 2025– | Al-Qadsiah | 0 | (0) |

International career^{‡}
| 2020–2021 | Saudi Arabia U20 | | |
- * Club domestic league appearances and goals as of 9 October 2025 ‡ National team caps and goals as of 9 October 2025 (UTC)

Meshari Abdulaziz Sunyur (Arabic: مشاري عبد العزيز سنيور; born 5 December 2001) is a Saudi Arabian footballer who plays as a goalkeeper for Al-Qadsiah.

== Club career ==
Sunyur started his career at the youth teams of Al-Raed. On 9 August 2020, he signed his first professional contract with Al-Raed. On 13 August 2024, Abu Al-Shamat renewed his contract with Al-Qadsiah. On 25 July 2025, he joined Al-Qadsiah on a four-year deal.
