= Mohammed Abu Al-Shamat =

Saudi Arabian footballer

Personal information
- Full name: Mohammed Waheeb Saeed Abu Al-Shamat
- Date of birth: 11 August 2002 (age 24)
- Place of birth: Jeddah, Saudi Arabia
- Height: 1.70 m (5 ft 7 in)
- Position: Right-back

Team information
- Current team: Al-Qadsiah
- Number: 2

Youth career
- 2010–2017: Al-Ahli
- 2017–2022: Al-Qadsiah

Senior career*
Years	Team	Apps	(Gls)
2022–	Al-Qadsiah	112	(8)

International career^{‡}
2023–2024	Saudi Arabia U23	12	(1)
2023–	Saudi Arabia	17	(0)
- * Club domestic league appearances and goals as of 16 October 2026 ‡ National team caps and goals as of 13 November 2026 (UTC)

Mohammed Waheeb Abu Al-Shamat (Arabic: محمد وهيب أبو الشامات; born 11 August 2002) is a Saudi Arabian footballer who plays as a right-back for Al-Qadsiah and the Saudi Arabia national team. He is the twin brother of fellow player Saleh Abu Al-Shamat.

== Club career ==
Abu Al-Shamat started his career at the age of 8 in youth teams of Al-Ahli. He moved to Al-Qadsiah in 2017. On 5 November 2020, he signed his first professional contract with Al-Qadsiah. On 13 August 2024, Abu Al-Shamat renewed his contract with Al-Qadsiah.

== International Career ==
On 31 May 2026, he was named in the 26-man squad for the 2026 FIFA World Cup.

== Career statistics ==
=== International ===
As of match played 13 November 2026

Appearances and goals by national team and year
National team	Year	Apps	Goals
Saudi Arabia	2023	2	0
Saudi Arabia	2024	–	
Saudi Arabia	2025	3	0
Saudi Arabia	2026	12	0
Total		17	0

== Honours ==
Individual

- Saudi Pro League Team of the Season: 2024–25, 2025–26
