= Al Taawoun FC =

Association football club in Saudi Arabia

Al-Taawoun
- Full name: Al-Taawoun Football Club
- Nicknames: Sukkari Al-Qassim (Sugar of Al-Qassim); Al-Dhiyaab (The Wolves)
- Founded: 1956; 70 years ago
- Ground: King Abdullah Sport City Stadium, Al-Taawoun Stadium, Al-Qassim, Saudi Arabia
- Capacity: 25,000; 5,624
- Owner: Ministry of Sport
- Chairman: Saud Al-Rashoodi
- Manager: Vuk Rašović
- League: Saudi Pro League
- 2025–26: Pro League, 6th of 18
- Website: altaawounfc.com
Home colours	Away colours	Third colours

Al-Taawoun FC (Arabic: نادي التعاون) is a Saudi Arabian professional football and multi-sports club based in Buraidah, Saudi Arabia, that competes in the Saudi Pro League, the top tier of the Saudi football league system.

The club plays its home matches at King Abdullah Sport City Stadium, located in the city of Buraidah, which it shares with city rivals Al-Raed, with whom it contests the Qassim Derby. Additionally, the club uses the smaller Al-Taawoun Stadium for less prominent fixtures. The name "Al Taawoun" translates to "cooperation" in Arabic.

== History ==
Al-Taawoun were founded in 1956 under the name of "Al-Shabab" by their founder Saleh Al Wabili. Four years after the founding of the club, they were officially registered as a professional club in 1960.

On 25 May 1990, Al-Taawoun reached the 1990 king cup final to face Al-Nasser but eventually lost 0–2. By reaching the final, Al-Taawoun became the second Saudi First Division League side to reach the final after Al-Riyadh in 1978. In the 2009–10 season, Al-Taawoun won promotion to the Pro League for the first time in over thirteen years as runners-up in the first division. Their last appearance in the top flight was in the 1997-98 season. They have been playing consecutively in the Saudi Pro League since the 2010–2011 season. On 29 May 2016, Al-Taawoun qualified to their debut AFC Champions League campaign for the first time ever by finishing fourth in the league during the 2015–16 season.

Their best ever top-flight season came in the 2018–19 season when the club successfully challenged for the Asian Champions League spots, eventually finishing in third place in the Saudi Pro League, their highest ever league position to date. And to top off their season, Al-Taawoun reached the King Cup final by thrashing Al-Hilal 5–0 at the King Saud University Stadium in the semi-final, and went on to defeat Al-Ittihad 2–1 in the final to claim their first-ever top-flight trophy, with the winning goal coming in the 90th minute. Al-Taawoun also became the first club from Al-Qassim Province to win the King Cup.

In the following season 2019–20, Al-Taawoun's performances were one of their worst in their league history. Al-Taawoun booked their spot in the 2019 super cup by winning the King Cup title the previous season. Al-Taawoun lost to Al-Nassr 4–5 in a penalty shoot-out after a 1–1 draw at the end of extra time. The club were almost relegated and needed a win in the final matchday against relegation threatened Al-Fayha, the highly tense match continued as a draw until the 91st minute when Mohammad Al-Sahlawi converted a cross with a tap in to make it 1-0 and avoid relegation in the final moments of the season. In the 2020–21 season Al-Taawoun reached their 3rd King Cup final in the 2020–21 edition to face Al-Faisaly, in the end Al-Faisaly won their first title after a 3–2 win over Al-Taawoun in the final on 27 May 2021.

Al-Taawoun qualified to the 2020 AFC Champions League as 2019 King Cup winners. Al-Taawoun finished the group as runners-up with a record of (3W,3L) to qualify to the knockout stages for the first time in their history. Al-Taawoun faced Al-Nassr in the round of 16 but eventually lost 0–1.

== Honours ==
King's Cup

- Winners (1): 2019
- Runners-up (2): 1990, 2020–21

Saudi Super Cup

- Runners-up (1): 2019

Saudi First Division League (tier 2)

- Winners (1): 1996–97
- Runners-up (2): 1994–95, 2009–10

Saudi Second Division League (tier 3)

- Winners (1): 1977–78

Prince Faisal bin Fahd Cup for Division 1 and 2 Teams.

- Winners (4): 1996–97, 2000–01, 2007–08, 2008–09

== Coaching staff ==
Position	Staff
Head coach	(Serbia) Vuk Rašović
Assistant coach	(Montenegro) Rudolf Marcic
Goalkeeper coach	Vacant
Fitness coach	Vacant
Performance coach	Vacant
Match analyst	Vacant
Performance analyst	Vacant
Doctor	(Serbia) Sinisa Petkovic (Saudi Arabia) Abdullah Bahusayn
Physiotherapist	(Serbia) Ljubomir Radeka
Sporting director	(Saudi Arabia) Abdullah Al-Ahmed

== Players ==
As of February 2026

Note: Flags indicate national team as defined under FIFA eligibility rules; some limited exceptions apply. Players may hold more than one non-FIFA nationality.

No.	Pos.	Nation	Player
1	GK	BRA	Mailson
4	DF	KSA	Nasser Al-Hulayel
5	DF	ALG	Zineddine Belaid
6	DF	KSA	Bassam Al-Hurayji
7	MF	KSA	Mohammed Al-Kuwaykibi
8	MF	CIV	Parfait Guiagon
9	FW	MAR	Abderrazak Hamdallah
10	MF	ALB	Nedim Bajrami (on loan from Rangers)
14	FW	KSA	Saif Rajab
16	MF	KSA	Faris Al-Ghamdi
17	MF	KSA	Mohammed Al-Aqel
18	MF	MAR	Aschraf El Mahdioui (captain)
19	MF	LBR	Oscar Dorley
20	FW	KSA	Bassem Al-Arini
23	MF	KSA	Rakan Al-Tulayhi

No.	Pos.	Nation	Player
25	GK	KSA	Abdulrahman Al-Senaid
27	DF	KSA	Adeeb Al-Hassan
30	GK	KSA	Abdullah Al-Jadaani
31	MF	KSA	Abdulrahman Al-Marwani
32	DF	KSA	Muteb Al-Mufarrij
33	FW	KSA	Anas Al-Ghamdi
39	GK	KSA	Abdulrahman Al-Ghamdi
40	MF	KSA	Ibrahim Mahnashi
43	DF	KSA	Nawaf Al-Huwairy
45	MF	KSA	Mohammed Al-Saadi
47	FW	MAR	Younes El Bahraoui
55	DF	ECU	Jair Collahuazo (on loan from Kudrivka)
70	MF	KSA	Abdulrahman Hindi
88	MF	BUL	Marin Petkov
93	DF	KSA	Awn Al-Saluli

=== Out on loan ===
Note: Flags indicate national team as defined under FIFA eligibility rules; some limited exceptions apply. Players may hold more than one non-FIFA nationality.

No.	Pos.	Nation	Player
11	MF	KSA	Fahad Al-Rashidi (at Al-Khaleej)
12	DF	KSA	Turki Al-Jaadi (at Al-Fayha)
28	MF	KSA	Turki Al-Shaifan (at Al-Saqer)

No.	Pos.	Nation	Player
44	MF	KSA	Abdulmalik Al-Marwani (at Al-Jabalain)
—	FW	KSA	Keshim Al-Qahtani (at Abha)

== International competitions ==
=== Overview ===
As of 15 April 2025

Competition	Pld	W	D	L	GF	GA
AFC Champions League Elite	20	6	4	10	25	34
AFC Champions League Two	13	6	5	2	21	15
GCC Champions League	5	1	4	0	7	6
Total	38	13	13	12	53	55

=== Record by country ===
Country	Pld	W	D	L	GF	GA	GD	Win%
Bahrain	2	2	0	0	5	3	+2	100.00
Iran	8	1	3	4	7	10	−3	12.50
Iraq	2	1	0	1	2	2	+0	50.00
Oman	3	1	2	0	4	3	+1	33.33
Qatar	8	3	4	1	15	12	+3	37.50
Saudi Arabia	1	0	0	1	0	1	−1	0.00
Syria	1	0	1	0	1	1	+0	0.00
Turkmenistan	2	2	0	0	6	1	+5	100.00
United Arab Emirates	7	2	2	3	4	12	−8	28.57
Uzbekistan	4	1	1	2	9	10	−1	25.00
Total	38	13	13	12	53	55	−2	34.21

=== International record ===
==== Matches ====
Season	Competition	Round	Club	Home	Away	Aggregate
2015	GCC Champions League	Group A	(Oman) Al-Suwaiq	1–0	2−2	2nd
2015	GCC Champions League	Group A	(Qatar) Al-Rayyan	1–1	2–2	2nd
2015	GCC Champions League	Quarter-finals	(United Arab Emirates) Al-Nasr	–	1−1 (p)	1–1 (p)
2017	AFC Champions League	Group A	(Uzbekistan) Lokomotiv Tashkent	1–0	4−4	3rd
2017	AFC Champions League	Group A	(Iran) Esteghlal	1–2	0−3	3rd
2017	AFC Champions League	Group A	(United Arab Emirates) Al-Ahli	1–3	0−0	3rd
2020	AFC Champions League	Group C	(United Arab Emirates) Sharjah	0–6	1–0	2nd
2020	AFC Champions League	Group C	(Qatar) Al-Duhail	2–0	1–0	2nd
2020	AFC Champions League	Group C	(Iran) Persepolis	0–1	0–1	2nd
2020	AFC Champions League	Round of 16	(Saudi Arabia) Al-Nassr	0–1		0–1
2022	AFC Champions League	Play-off round	(Syria) Al-Jaish	1–1 (5–4 p)	–	1–1 (5–4 p)
2022	AFC Champions League	Group D	(Qatar) Al-Duhail	3–4	2–1	2nd
2022	AFC Champions League	Group D	(Uzbekistan) Pakhtakor	0–1	4–5	2nd
2022	AFC Champions League	Group D	(Iran) Sepahan	3–0	1–1	2nd
2024–25	AFC Champions League Two	Group B	(Bahrain) Al-Khaldiya	2–1	3–2	1st
2024–25	AFC Champions League Two	Group B	(Iraq) Al-Quwa Al-Jawiya	1–2	1–0	1st
2024–25	AFC Champions League Two	Group B	(Turkmenistan) Altyn Asyr	2–1	4–0	1st
2024–25	AFC Champions League Two	Round of 16	(Qatar) Al-Wakrah	2–2	2–2	4–4 (4–3 p)
2024–25	AFC Champions League Two	Quarter-finals	(Iran) Tractor	2–2	0–0	2–2 (4–2 p)
2024–25	AFC Champions League Two	Semi-finals	(United Arab Emirates) Sharjah	1–0	0–2	1–2
2026–27	AFC Champions League Two	Group C	(Jordan) Al-Faisaly	3–1	2–0	
2026–27	AFC Champions League Two	Group C	(Oman) Al-Nahda		1–1	
2026–27	AFC Champions League Two	Group C	(Qatar) Al-Rayyan	2–1		

== Past seasons ==
Season	League	Position
1985–86	Saudi First Division League	3rd
1986–87	Saudi First Division League	5th
1987–88	Saudi First Division League	7th
1988–89	Saudi First Division League	4th
1989–90	Saudi First Division League	?
1990–91	Saudi First Division League	3rd
1991–92	Saudi First Division League	7th
1992–93	Saudi First Division League	5th
1993–94	Saudi First Division League	4th
1994–95	Saudi First Division League	2nd
1995–96	Saudi Premier League	11th
1996–97	Saudi First Division League	1st
1997–98	Saudi Premier League	12th
1998–99	Saudi First Division League	8th
1999–00	Saudi First Division League	8th
2000–01	Saudi First Division League	7th
2001–02	Saudi First Division League	6th
2002–03	Saudi First Division League	7th
2003–04	Saudi First Division League	7th
2004–05	Saudi First Division League	5th
2005–06	Saudi First Division League	10th
2006–07	Saudi First Division League	6th
2007–08	Saudi First Division League	7th
2008–09	Saudi First Division League	7th
2009–10	Saudi First Division League	2nd
2010–11	Saudi Pro League	8th
2011–12	Saudi Pro League	12th
2012–13	Saudi Pro League	12th
2013–14	Saudi Pro League	5th
2014–15	Saudi Pro League	9th
2015–16	Saudi Pro League	4th
2016–17	Saudi Pro League	7th
2017–18	Saudi Pro League	7th
2018–19	Saudi Pro League	3rd
2019–20	Saudi Pro League	12th
2020–21	Saudi Pro League	4th
2021–22	Saudi Pro League	12th
2022–23	Saudi Pro League	5th
2023–24	Saudi Pro League	4th

== Managers ==
- (Republic of Ireland) Eoin Hand (5 October 1986 – 1987)
- (Hungary) Antal Szentmihályi (1991–92)
- (Brazil) Marco Cunha (2004)
- (Turkey) Tohid Sebravî (2008–09)
- (Brazil) Celso Fernandes (2008–09)
- (Tunisia) Abderrazek Chebbi (31 May 2009 – 1 January 2010)
- (Romania) Grigore Sichitiu (10 January 2010 – 9 May 2010)
- (Romania) Gheorghe Mulțescu (3 July 2010 – 20 December 2010)
- (Romania) Florin Motroc (22 December 2010 – 29 December 2011)
- (Croatia) Srećko Juričić (1 January 2012 – 20 January 2012)
- (Romania) Grigore Sichitiu (20 January 2012 – 1 April 2012)
- (Egypt) Khalid Kamal (caretaker) (1 April 2012 – 24 June 2012)
- (North Macedonia) Gjoko Hadžievski (1 July 2012 – 20 February 2013)
- (Algeria) Taoufik Rouabah (February 2013 – September 2014)
- (Portugal) José Gomes (September 2014 – 29 May 2016)
- (Switzerland) Darije Kalezić (2 June 2016 – 16 October 2016)
- (Romania) Constantin Gâlcă (18 October 2016 – 20 March 2017)
- (Portugal) José Gomes (21 March 2017 – 2 May 2018)
- (Portugal) Pedro Emanuel (7 May 2018 – May 2019)
- (Portugal) Paulo Sérgio (21 May 2019 – 29 December 2019)
- (Saudi Arabia) Abdullah Asiri (caretaker) (29 December 2019 – 15 January 2020)
- (Portugal) Vítor Campelos (15 January 2020 – 30 August 2020)
- (Saudi Arabia) Abdullah Asiri (caretaker) (30 August 2020 – 16 September 2020)
- (France) Patrice Carteron (16 September 2020 – 12 March 2021)
- (Serbia) Nestor El Maestro (13 March 2021 – 22 August 2021)
- (Portugal) José Gomes (22 August 2021 – 20 March 2022)
- (Netherlands) John van den Brom (31 March 2022 – 7 May 2022)
- (Saudi Arabia) Mohammed Al-Abdali (caretaker) (7 May 2022 – 28 June 2022)
- (Brazil) Péricles Chamusca (29 June 2022 – 1 June 2024)
- (Argentina) Rodolfo Arruabarrena (6 July 2024 – 9 February 2025)
- (Saudi Arabia) Mohammed Al-Abdali (caretaker) (10 February 2025 – 20 July 2025)
- (Brazil) Péricles Chamusca (20 July 2025 – 30 June 2026)

== See also ==
- List of football clubs in Saudi Arabia
