= Hubert Auer (footballer) =

Austrian footballer and coach

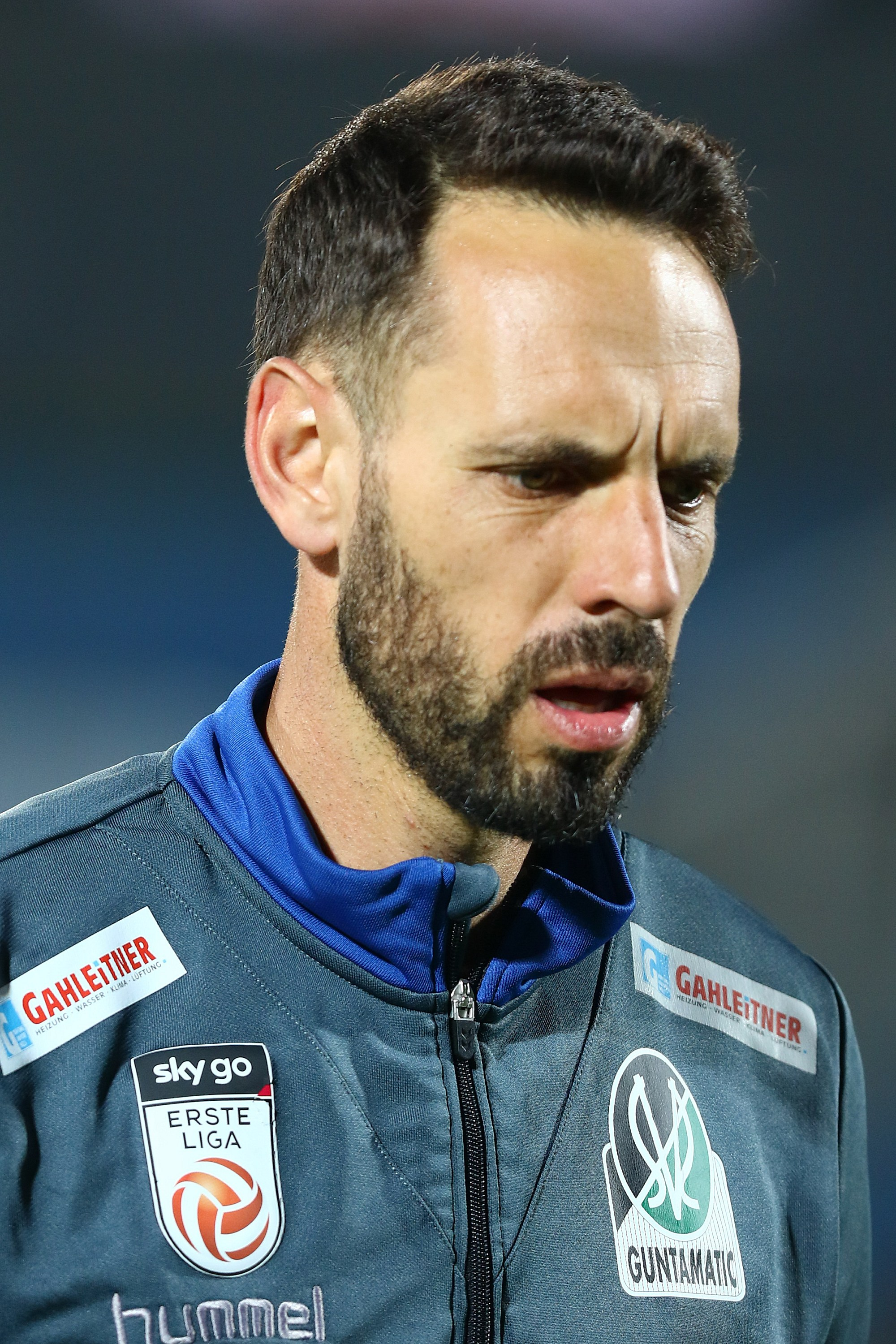
- Hubert Auer in 2018.

Personal information
- Date of birth: 19 December 1981 (age 44)
- Place of birth: Austria
- Height: 1.91 m (6 ft 3 in)
- Position: Goalkeeper

Senior career*
Years	Team	Apps	(Gls)
2003–2004	BSV Bad Bleiberg	18	(0)
2004–2005	Kelag Kärnten	2	(0)
2006–2008	FC Lustenau	35	(0)
2008–2011	SV Ried	3	(0)
2011–2013	SV Grödig	2	(0)
- * Club domestic league appearances and goals as of 21 May 2013

Hubert Auer (born 19 December 1981) is an Austrian retired footballer and current goalkeeping coach.
