= Jehad Thakri =

Saudi Arabian footballer

Personal information
- Full name: Jehad Abdullatif Ahmed Thakri
- Date of birth: 21 July 2001 (age 25)
- Place of birth: Khobar, Saudi Arabia
- Height: 1.83 m (6 ft 0 in)
- Position: Defender

Team information
- Current team: Al-Qadsiah
- Number: 4

Youth career
- –2021: Al-Qadsiah

Senior career*
| Years | Team | Apps | (Gls) |
| 2021– | Al-Qadsiah | 92 | (2) |

International career^{‡}
| 2021–2023 | Saudi Arabia U23 | | |
| 2025– | Saudi Arabia | 12 | (0) |
- * Club domestic league appearances and goals as of 11 September 2026 ‡ National team caps and goals as of 6 October 2026

Jehad Abdullatif Ahmed Thakri (Arabic: جهاد ذكري; born 21 July 2001) is a Saudi Arabian footballer who plays as a defender for Al-Qadsiah and the Saudi Arabia national team.

== Club Career ==
Thakri started his career at the youth teams of Al-Qadsiah. On 5 November 2020, Thakri signed his first professional contract with Al-Qadsiah. He made his first-team debut on 23 February 2021 in the league match against Al-Batin.

== International Career ==
On 31 May 2026, he was named in the 26-man squad for the 2026 FIFA World Cup.

== Career statistics ==
=== Club ===
| Club | Season | League | | | National Cup | | Continental | | Total | |
| Club | Season | League | Apps | Goals | Apps | Goals | Apps | Goals | Apps | Goals |
|---|---|---|---|---|---|---|---|---|---|---|
| Al Qadsiah | 2020-21 | Saudi Pro League | 1 | 0 | 0 | 0 | — | | 1 | 0 |
| Al Qadsiah | 2023-24 | Saudi First Division League | 23 | 0 | 0 | 0 | — | | 23 | 0 |
| Total | | | 24 | 0 | 0 | 0 | 0 | 0 | 24 | 0 |

== Honours ==
Al-Qadsiah

- First Division League: 2023–24
