= Al Qadsiah FC =

Association football club in Saudi Arabia

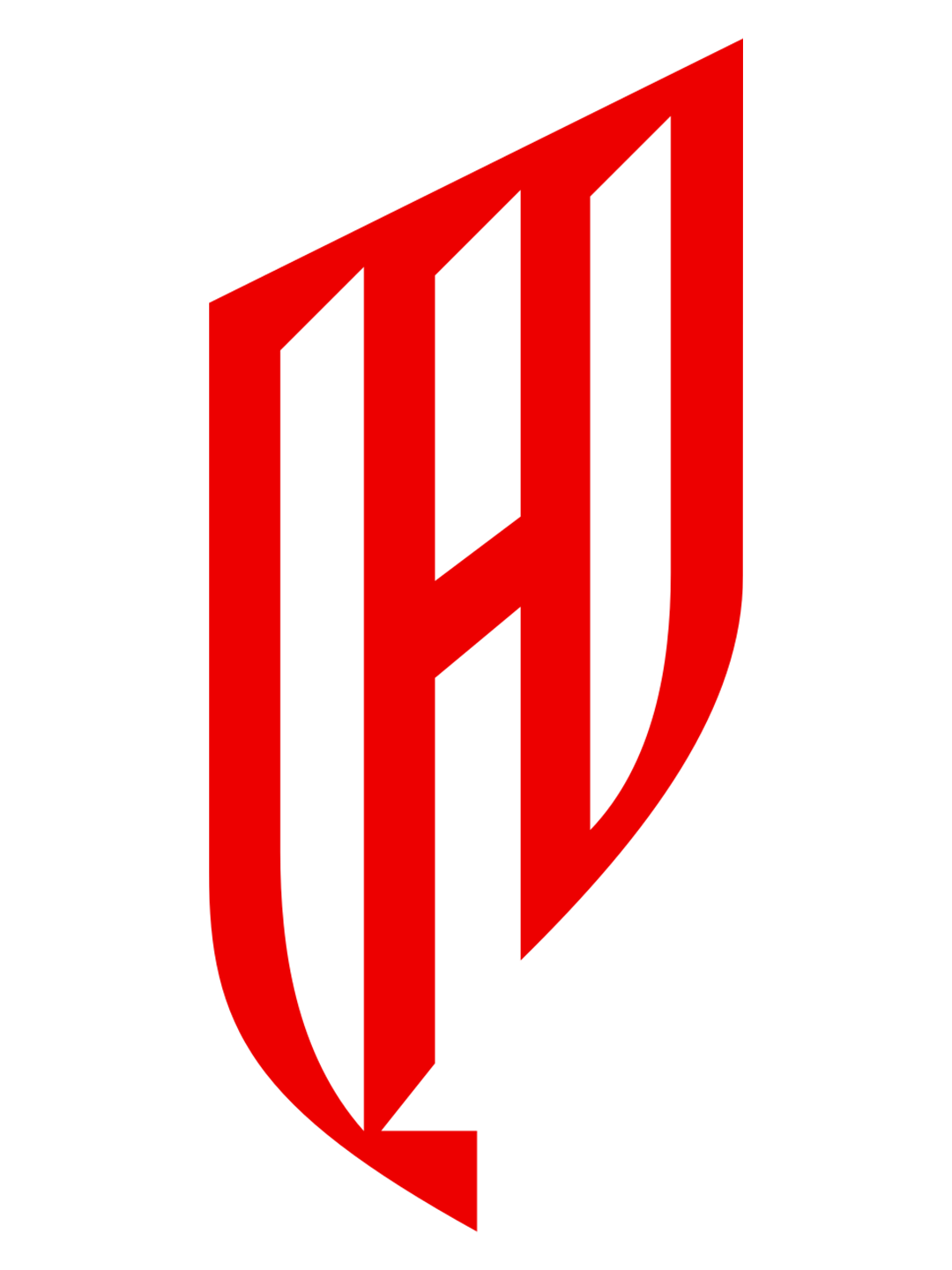
- Full name: Al Qadsiah Saudi Football Club
- Nickname: Fares Al Sharqiya (The Eastern Knights) Abnāʾ al-Qādisiyyah (Sons of Qadsiah) Fakhr ash-Sharqiyyah (Pride of the Eastern Province)
- Founded: December 1, 1967; 58 years ago
- Ground: Prince Mohamed bin Fahd Stadium (Aramco Stadium planned)
- Capacity: 26,000
- Owner: Saudi Aramco
- Chairman: Bader Al-Reziza
- Head coach: Brendan Rodgers
- League: Saudi Pro League
- 2025–26: Pro League, 4th of 18
- Website: alqadsiah.com
Home colours	Away colours	Third colours

Al Qadsiah Football Club (Arabic: نادي القادسية لكرة القدم) is a Saudi Arabian professional football club based in Khobar, Eastern Province, Saudi Arabia. The club competes in the Saudi Pro League, the top tier of the Saudi football league system.

== History ==
Al-Qadsiah have been a regular participant in the Saudi Premier League since its inception in the inaugural 1976–77 season, their best ever top-flight season came in the 1980–81 season when they finished in 3rd place. Al-Qadsiah's most successful period in their history came in the early 90's when they won the 1991-92 Crown Prince Cup against Al-Shabab 4–2 on penalties to claim their first ever top flight title. The club's cup win qualified them for the Asian Cup Winners' Cup, where they reached the final to face South China whom they beat 6–2 on aggregate to clinch the 1993–94 title. In the same season they also picked up the 1993–94 Saudi Federation Cup by beating Al-Nassr 2–0 in the final. After 21 consecutive seasons in the top flight, as well as achieving two domestic titles and one continental title the club was relegated for the first time in their history in the 1996–97 season.

Following the club's first relegation, Al-Qadsiah have become inconsistent in their performances, yo-yoing between divisions with five promotions and relegations since the 1999–2000 season.

In the summer of 2023, the Ministry of Sports announced that Al-Qadsiah, together with seven other clubs in Saudi Arabia, are transformed into companies and Al-Qadsiah become owned by Saudi Aramco. The team, who competes in the Saudi First Division League, invest in transfers in order to fight for promotion to Saudi Pro League.

On 6 May 2024, Al-Qadsiah was promoted to Saudi Pro League following a 2–2 draw with Ohod.

== Honours ==
=== Al-Qadsiah Honours ===
Type	Competition	Titles	Seasons
Domestic	Crown Prince's Cup	1	1991–92
Domestic	Saudi Federation Cup	1	1993–94
Domestic	Saudi First Division League	4^{s}	2001–02, 2008–09, 2014–15, 2023–24
Continental (AFC)	Asian Cup Winners' Cup	1	1993–94

- record
- ^{s} shared record

== International Competitions ==
=== Overview ===
As of 1 May 2013

Competition	Pld	W	D	L	GF	GA
Asian Cup Winners' Cup	6	4	1	1	12	5
Arab Club Champions Cup	2	1	0	1	3	3
Arab Cup Winners' Cup	6	3	1	2	10	4
TOTAL	14	8	2	4	25	12

=== Record by country ===
Country	Pld	W	D	L	GF	GA	GD	Win%
Algeria	1	1	0	0	4	2	+2	100.00
Bahrain	2	1	0	1	4	2	+2	50.00
Iraq	3	2	0	1	6	3	+3	66.67
Hong Kong	2	2	0	0	6	2	+4	100.00
Morocco	2	0	0	2	0	2	−2	0.00
Qatar	2	1	1	0	2	1	+1	50.00
Sudan	1	1	0	0	3	0	+3	100.00
United Arab Emirates	1	0	1	0	0	0	+0	0.00

=== Matches ===
Season	Competition	Round	Club	Home	Away	Aggregate
1993–94	Asian Cup Winners' Cup	1R	(Bahrain) Al-Wehda	4–1	0−1	4–2
1993–94	Asian Cup Winners' Cup	QF	(Maldives) New Radiant	–	–	w/o
1993–94	Asian Cup Winners' Cup	SF	(Qatar) Al-Arabi	1–0	1−1	2–1
1993–94	Asian Cup Winners' Cup	Final	(Hong Kong) South China	2–0	4−2	6–2
1993–94	Arab Cup Winners' Cup	Group B	(Algeria) ASO Chlef	4–2		2nd
1993–94	Arab Cup Winners' Cup	Group B	(Iraq) Haifa	3–0		2nd
1993–94	Arab Cup Winners' Cup	Group B	(Morocco) CO Casablanca	0–1		2nd
1993–94	Arab Cup Winners' Cup	Group B	(United Arab Emirates) Al-Nasr	0–0		2nd
1993–94	Arab Cup Winners' Cup	SF	(Sudan) Al-Mourada	3–0		3–0
1993–94	Arab Cup Winners' Cup	Final	(Morocco) CO Casablanca	0–1		0–1
2005–06	Arab Champions League	R32	(Iraq) Al-Zawraa	3–2	0–1	3–3 (a)

Key: 1R/2R – First/Second round; R16 – Round of 16; QF – Quarter-final; SF – Semi-final;

Notes

New Radiant withdrew.

== Players ==
As of September 2026

Note: Flags indicate national team as defined under FIFA eligibility rules; some limited exceptions apply. Players may hold more than one non-FIFA nationality.

No.	Pos.	Nation	Player
1	GK	BEL	Koen Casteels
2	DF	KSA	Mohammed Abu Al-Shamat
4	DF	KSA	Jehad Thakri
5	MF	GER	Julian Weigl
6	DF	ESP	Nacho
7	MF	KSA	Turki Al-Ammar
8	MF	URU	Nahitan Nández
9	FW	KSA	Abdullah Al-Salem
10	MF	KSA	Musab Al-Juwayr
11	MF	KSA	Ali Hazazi
12	DF	KSA	Yasser Al-Shahrani
13	DF	KSA	Abdulelah Al-Ghwayzan
14	MF	NED	Tijjani Reijnders
15	MF	KSA	Mohammed al-Qahtani
17	DF	URU	Gastón Álvarez
18	MF	KSA	Abdulmalik Al-Jaber (on loan from Al-Nassr)

No.	Pos.	Nation	Player
19	FW	KSA	Haitham Asiri
22	MF	GHA	Christopher Bonsu Baah
23	DF	KSA	Waleed Al-Ahmed
24	DF	KSA	Mohammed Qassem
26	DF	CIV	Ali Badra Diabaté
27	MF	KSA	Eyad Housa
28	GK	KSA	Ahmed Al-Kassar
30	FW	FRA	Mahamadou Sangaré
31	GK	KSA	Abdullah Al-Muhaysin
32	FW	ITA	Mateo Retegui
33	FW	MEX	Julián Quiñones
35	DF	KSA	Ahmed Al-Siyahi
46	MF	KSA	Abdulaziz Al-Aliwa
50	GK	KSA	Meshari Sunyur
60	GK	KSA	Wafi Al-Aklabi
70	FW	NGR	Suleman Sani

=== Out on loan ===
Note: Flags indicate national team as defined under FIFA eligibility rules; some limited exceptions apply. Players may hold more than one non-FIFA nationality.

No.	Pos.	Nation	Player
16	DF	MAR	Souffian El Karouani (at Benfica)
20	FW	BRA	Gabriel Carvalho (at Shakhtar Donetsk)
25	MF	POR	Otávio (at Al-Rayyan)
66	DF	KSA	Ahmed Kaabi (at Al-Jeel)
77	FW	SDN	Sultan Harun (at Al-Ettifaq)

No.	Pos.	Nation	Player
88	MF	SUI	Cameron Puertas (at Al-Wasl)
90	MF	KSA	Amar Al-Yuhaybi (at Abha)
—	DF	ESP	Carlos Jiménez (at Jeddah)
—	MF	ESP	Iker Almena (at Dinamo Zagreb)

== Current staff ==
Position	Name
Chairman	(Saudi Arabia) Bader Al-Reziza
Chief executive officer	(England) James Bisgrove
Head coach	(Northern Ireland) Brendan Rodgers
Assistant coaches	(Scotland) John Kennedy (Scotland) Jack Lyons (England) Nathan Rooney
Technical coach	(Belgium) Eliot Tybebo
Goalkeeper coach	(Austria) Hubert Auer
Conditioning coach	(Spain) Antonio Muñoz
Performance Department	(Saudi Arabia) Hani Al-Haddad (Spain) Miguel Ángel García
Nutritionist	(Spain) Albert Martínez Sanromà
Chief analyst	(Wales) Dominic Mahoney
Match analysts	(South Africa) Dayle Solomon (Spain) Pedro Serna
Youth coaches	(Portugal) Rui Sá Lemos (Poland) Rafal Kwiecien
Physiotherapists	(Spain) Jesus David Arco (Spain) Álvaro Astolfi Ramos (Netherlands) Jesper Gabriels
Soft tissue therapist	(England) Stewart Welsh
Interpreter	(Saudi Arabia) Mushari Al-Ghamdi
Academy manager	(Spain) Carlos Hugo
Technical director	(Spain) Carlos Antón
Assistant technical director	(England) Samuel Bensley

== Al-Qadsiah Awards ==
The Al-Qadsiah Awards is an annual award event held at the end of each season to honor exceptional performances by both the men's and women's teams of the club. The event was inaugurated in the 2024–25 season.

Season	Best Player	Best Promising Player	Top Scorer	Best Community Player	Goal of the Season	Ref.
2024–25	Koen Casteels (Belgium)	Mohammed Abu Al-Shamat (Saudi Arabia)	Julián Quiñones (Mexico)	Pierre-Emerick Aubameyang (Gabon)	Cameron Puertas (Spain)	
2025–26	Julián Quiñones (Mexico)	Musab Al-Juwayr (Saudi Arabia)	Julián Quiñones (Mexico)	N/A	Musab Al-Juwayr (Saudi Arabia)	

== Managerial history ==
Years	Name	Nationality
1969–71	Ali Sayed Ahmed Sheikh	Sudan
1989–90	Shehta	Egypt
1992–93	Khalil Ibrahim Al-Zayani	Saudi Arabia
1993–94	Ján Pivarník	Slovakia
1995–96	Hans-Dieter Schmidt	Germany
1997–98	Noureddine Saâdi	Algeria
1999–01	Cabralzinho	Brazil
2001–03	Ahmad Al-Ajlani	Tunisia
2003	Youssef Zouaoui	Tunisia
2003–04	Ján Pivarník	Slovakia
2004–05	Ahmad Al-Ajlani	Tunisia
2008–09	Abderrazek Chebbi	Tunisia
2009	Daniel Lanata	Argentina
2009	Ammar Souayah	Tunisia
2009	Anas Al-Zerqati (caretaker)	Tunisia
2009–11	Dimitar Dimitrov	Bulgaria
2011–13	Mariano Barreto	Portugal
2013	Mladen Frančić	Croatia
2013–14	Abderrazek Chebbi	Tunisia
2014	Omar Bakhashwain	Saudi Arabia
2014	Ayman Lajdidi	Tunisia
2014	Gjoko Hadžievski	North Macedonia
2014–15	Jameel Qassem	Tunisia
2015–16	Alexandre Gallo	Brazil
2016	Hamad Al-Dossari	Saudi Arabia
2016	Riadh Belkhir	Algeria
2016–17	Hélio dos Anjos	Brazil
2017	Bandar Basraih	Saudi Arabia
2017	Nacif Beyaoui	Tunisia
2017–18	Paulo Bonamigo	Brazil
2018	Bandar Basraih	Saudi Arabia
2018	Aleksandar Stanojević	Serbia
2018–19	Ivaylo Petev	Bulgaria
2019	Bandar Basraih	Saudi Arabia
2019	Nacif Beyaoui	Tunisia
2019–21	Yousef Al Mannai	Tunisia
2021	Mohammed Dahmane	Tunisia
2022	Aleksandar Ilić	Serbia
2022	Khaled Al-Atwi	Saudi Arabia
2022–23	Habib Ben Romdhane	Tunisia
2023	Yousef Al-Ghadeer	Saudi Arabia
2023	Robbie Fowler	England
2023–2025	Míchel	Spain
2025–	Brendan Rodgers	Northern Ireland

== See also ==
- List of football clubs in Saudi Arabia
- Al Qadsiah FC (women)

Preceded by Yokohama F·Marinos (Japan)	Asian Cup Winners' Cup; Runner-up: South China; 1994	Succeeded by Yokohama Flügels (Japan)
