= 2025–26 Al-Taawoun FC season =

Al-Taawoun
2025–26 season
- President: Badr Al-Ghannam
- Manager: Péricles Chamusca
- Stadium: King Abdullah Sport City Stadium; Al-Taawoun Club Stadium
- Pro League: Pre-season
- King Cup: Round of 32
- All statistics correct as of 1 July 2025.

The 2025–26 season was Al-Taawoun's 70th year in their history and 16th consecutive season in the Pro League. The club participated in the Pro League and the King Cup.

The season covered the period from 1 July 2025 to 30 June 2026.

== Players ==
=== Squad information ===
As of 1 July 2025

Note: Flags indicate national team as defined under FIFA eligibility rules; some limited exceptions apply. Players may hold more than one non-FIFA nationality.

No.	Pos.	Nation	Player
1	GK	BRA	Mailson
2	DF	KSA	Ali Sharahili
3	DF	BRA	Andrei Girotto
5	DF	KSA	Mohammed Mahzari
7	MF	KSA	Mohammed Al-Kuwaykibi
8	MF	KSA	Saad Al-Nasser
9	FW	KSA	Abdulfattah Adam
13	GK	KSA	Abdulquddus Atiah
14	DF	KSA	Fahad Al-Jumayah
16	DF	VEN	Renné Rivas
18	MF	MAR	Aschraf El Mahdioui
21	DF	KSA	Fahad Al-Abdulrazzaq
23	DF	KSA	Waleed Al-Ahmed
24	MF	MAR	Flávio Medeiros
25	GK	KSA	Abdulrahman Al-Senaid
26	DF	KSA	Ibrahim Al-Shoeil
27	MF	KSA	Sultan Mandash
28	MF	KSA	Turki Al-Shaifan

No.	Pos.	Nation	Player
29	MF	KSA	Ahmed Bahusayn
31	GK	KSA	Mohammed Al-Dhulayfi
32	DF	KSA	Muteb Al-Mufarrij
33	FW	KSA	Anas Al-Ghamdi
38	FW	COL	Roger Martínez
43	DF	KSA	Emad Al-Qunaian
44	MF	KSA	Abdulmalik Al-Marwani
67	MF	KSA	Mohammed Baker
76	MF	MAR	Fayçal Fajr
90	MF	KSA	Hattan Bahebri
91	MF	KSA	Rakan Al-Tulayhi
93	DF	KSA	Awn Al-Saluli
98	GK	KSA	Abdulrahman Al-Ghamdi
99	FW	GAM	Musa Barrow
—	DF	KSA	Adeeb Al-Hassan
—	MF	KSA	Abdulrahman Al-Mughais
—	MF	KSA	Abdulmalek Al-Shammeri
—	FW	KSA	Bassem Al-Oraini

== Transfers and loans ==
=== Transfers in ===
Entry date	Position	No.	Player	From club	Fee	Ref.
30 June 2025	DF	43	(Saudi Arabia) Emad Al-Qunaian	(Saudi Arabia) Hajer	End of loan	
30 June 2025	DF	–	(Saudi Arabia) Adeeb Al-Hassan	(Saudi Arabia) Al-Arabi	End of loan	
30 June 2025	DF	–	(Saudi Arabia) Abdulmalek Al-Shammeri	(Saudi Arabia) Al-Orobah	End of loan	
30 June 2025	MF	67	(Saudi Arabia) Mohammed Baker	(Saudi Arabia) Al-Jabalain	End of loan	
30 June 2025	MF	91	(Saudi Arabia) Rakan Al-Tulayhi	(Saudi Arabia) Al-Arabi	End of loan	
30 June 2025	MF	13	(Saudi Arabia) Abdulrahman Al-Mughais	(Saudi Arabia) Al-Hilaliyah	End of loan	
30 June 2025	FW	–	(Saudi Arabia) Bassem Al-Oraini	(Saudi Arabia) Al-Kholood	End of loan	
1 July 2025	DF	16	(Venezuela) Renné Rivas	(Venezuela) Caracas	$705,000	
1 July 2025	MF	5	(Saudi Arabia) Mohammed Mahzari	(Saudi Arabia) Al-Ettifaq	$1,600,000	
12 July 2025	MF	–	(Syria) Bassam Al-Hamad	(Saudi Arabia) Al-Raed	Free	
6 August 2025	MF	–	(Saudi Arabia) Mohammed Al-Aqel	(Saudi Arabia) Al-Riyadh	Free	
10 September 2025	DF	–	(Saudi Arabia) Bassam Al-Hurayji	(Saudi Arabia) Al-Ahli	Undisclosed	
10 September 2025	MF	–	(Brazil) Victor Hugo	(Brazil) Cascavel	Undisclosed	

=== Loans in ===
Start date	End date	Position	No.	Player	To club	Fee	Ref.
11 August 2025	End of season	MF	–	(Saudi Arabia) Abdulelah Hawsawi	(Saudi Arabia) Al-Ittihad	None	
31 August 2025	End of season	MF	–	(France) Angelo Fulgini	(France) Lens	None	
10 September 2025	End of season	DF	–	(Saudi Arabia) Mohammed Al-Dossari	(Saudi Arabia) Neom	None	
10 September 2025	End of season	DF	–	(Saudi Arabia) Meshal Al-Alaeli	(Saudi Arabia) Al-Ettifaq	None	
10 September 2025	15 January 2026	MF	–	(France) Romain Faivre	(England) Bournemouth	None	
10 September 2025	End of season	FW	19	(Ecuador) Cristhoper Zambrano	(Ecuador) Aucas	$200,000	
10 January 2026	End of season	MF	15	(Saudi Arabia) Mohammed Al-Qahtani	(Saudi Arabia) Al-Hilal	None	

=== Transfers out ===
Exit date	Position	No.	Player	To club	Fee	Ref.
30 June 2025	DF	5	(Saudi Arabia) Mohammed Mahzari	(Saudi Arabia) Al-Ettifaq	End of loan	
30 June 2025	DF	16	(Venezuela) Renné Rivas	(Venezuela) Caracas	End of loan	
30 June 2025	MF	6	(Saudi Arabia) Sultan Al-Farhan	(Saudi Arabia) Al-Ittihad	End of loan	
30 June 2025	MF	19	(Bolivia) Lucas Chávez	(Bolivia) Bolívar	End of loan	
30 June 2025	MF	70	(Morocco) Abdelhamid Sabiri	(Italy) Fiorentina	End of loan	
2 August 2025	GK	31	(Saudi Arabia) Mohammed Al-Dhulayfi	(Saudi Arabia) Al-Anwar	Free	
4 August 2025	DF	21	(Saudi Arabia) Fahad Al-Abdulrazzaq	(Saudi Arabia) Al-Najma	Free	
21 August 2025	MF	90	(Saudi Arabia) Hattan Bahebri	(Saudi Arabia) Al-Kholood	Free	
31 August 2025	DF	8	(Saudi Arabia) Saad Al-Nasser	(Saudi Arabia) Al-Nassr	$11,500,000	
1 September 2025	DF	–	(Saudi Arabia) Abdulmalek Al-Shammeri	(Saudi Arabia) Al-Anwar	Free	
10 September 2025	GK	50	(Saudi Arabia) Mohammed Al-Dawsari	(Saudi Arabia) Al-Adalah	Free	
12 September 2025	DF	14	(Saudi Arabia) Fahad Al-Jumayah	(Saudi Arabia) Al-Ula	Undisclosed	
23 September 2025	MF	76	(Morocco) Fayçal Fajr	(Saudi Arabia) Al-Jubail	Free	
10 January 2026	MF	27	(Saudi Arabia) Sultan Mandash	(Saudi Arabia) Al-Hilal	$4,000,000	

=== Loans out ===
Start date	End date	Position	No.	Player	To club	Fee	Ref.
7 September 2025	End of season	DF	16	(Venezuela) Renné Rivas	(United Arab Emirates) Kalba	None	
9 September 2025	End of season	DF	93	(Saudi Arabia) Awn Al-Saluli	(Saudi Arabia) Neom	None	

== Pre-season ==
30 July 2025 Friendly	Al-Taawoun (Saudi Arabia)	1–1	(Qatar) Al-Ahli Doha	Netherlands
17:00 CEST	Girotto 2'

4 August 2025 Friendly	Al-Taawoun (Saudi Arabia)	0–2	(Qatar) Al-Duhail	Netherlands
15:30 CEST		Report	Bourigeaud; Boulbina

8 August 2025 Friendly	Al-Taawoun (Saudi Arabia)	1–2	(Greece) Olympiacos	Vlaardingen, Netherlands
CEST	Martínez 51'	Report	Pnevmonidis 10'; Strefezza 47'	Stadium: Sportpark 't Nieuwelant

13 August 2025 Friendly	Al-Taawoun (Saudi Arabia)	1–0	(Saudi Arabia) Al-Fayha	Gorredijk, Netherlands
16:00 CEST	Mandash 6'	Report		Stadium: Sportpark De Ark

22 August 2025 Friendly	Al-Taawoun (Saudi Arabia)	1–2	(Saudi Arabia) Al-Kholood	Buraidah, Saudi Arabia
18:45 AST	Al-Ahmed 47'		Maolida 73' (pen.); Khalifa 89'	Stadium: Al-Taawoun Club Stadium

== Competitions ==
=== Overview ===
Competition	Record							
Competition	Pld	W	D	L	GF	GA	GD	Win %
Pro League	34	15	8	11	59	46	+13	44.12
King's Cup	2	1	1	0	5	1	+4	50.00
Total	36	16	9	11	64	47	+17	44.44

Updated to match played 30 January 2026
Source: Competitions

=== Pro League ===
==== League table ====
Pos	Team	Pld	W	D	L	GF	GA	GD	Pts	Qualification or relegation
4	Al-Qadsiah	34	23	8	3	83	34	+49	77	Qualification for AFC Champions League Elite league stage (Note: Al-Ahli also qualified as 2025–26 AFC Champions League Elite winners.)
5	Al-Ittihad	34	16	7	11	55	48	+7	55	Qualification for AFC Champions League Elite preliminary stage
6	Al-Taawoun	34	15	8	11	59	46	+13	53	Qualification for AFC Champions League Two group stage (Note: Since the winners of the 2025–26 King's Cup, Al-Hilal, had already qualified for the Champions League Elite, the spot given to the King's Cup winners (Champions League Two) was passed to the sixth-placed team.)
7	Al-Ettifaq	34	14	8	12	51	55	−4	50	Qualification for GFF Gulf Club Champions League group stage
8	Neom	34	12	9	13	43	48	−5	45	Qualification for GFF Gulf Club Champions League group stage

Source: SPL
Rules for classification: 1) Points; 2) Head-to-head points; 3) Head-to-head goal difference; 4) Total goal difference; 5) Total goals scored; 6) Fair-play points
(Note: Head-to-head record is used only after all the matches between the teams in question have been played).

==== Results summary ====
Overall								Home						Away					
Pld	W	D	L	GF	GA	GD	Pts	W	D	L	GF	GA	GD	W	D	L	GF	GA	GD
18	12	2	4	36	20	+16	38	6	2	1	19	10	+9	6	0	3	17	10	+7

Last updated: 30 January 2026.
Source: Saudi Pro League

==== Results by round ====
Round	1	2	3	4	5	6	7	8	9	11	12	13	14	15	16	17	18	19	20	21	22	23	10	24	25	26	27	28	29	30	31	32	33	34
Ground	H	A	H	A	H	A	H	A	H	A	H	A	H	A	A	H	A	H	A	H	A	H	H	A	H	A	A	H	A	H	A	H	H	A
Result	L	W	W	W	W	W	W	W	D	W	W	L	W	L	W	D	L	W																
Position	18	12	6	5	3	2	2	2	3	3	3	3	3	3	3	5	5	5																

Updated to match(es) played on 30 January 2026. Source: Saudi Pro League
A = Away; H = Home; W = Win; D = Draw; L = Loss

==== Matches ====
All times are local, AST (UTC+3).

Win Draw Loss Postponed

29 August 2025 1	Al-Taawoun	0–5	Al-Nassr	Buraidah
21:00	Martínez (yellow card) 16'; Flávio (yellow card) 35'; Al-Jumayah (yellow card) 84'	Report	Félix 7', 67', 87'; Ronaldo 54' (pen.); Coman 55'; Yahya (yellow card) 61'	Stadium: King Abdullah Sports City; Attendance: 11,313; Referee: Abdullah Al-Shehri

13 September 2025 2	Al-Okhdood	2–3	Al-Taawoun	Najran
18:45	Kramer 31', (yellow card) 60'; Günter 56', (yellow card) 59'	Report	Flávio (yellow card) 12'; Barrow 15', 65'; Girotto (yellow card) 23'; Martínez 28'	Stadium: Prince Hathloul bin Abdulaziz Sports City; Attendance: 1,623; Referee: Khaled Al-Turais

18 September 2025 3	Al-Taawoun	4–1	Al-Ettifaq	Buraidah
18:40	Al-Kuwaykibi 9'; Al-Ahmed (yellow card) 40', (goal) 51'; Mandash 56'; Martínez 70' (pen.); Hawsawi (yellow card) 82'	Report	Hassan (yellow card) 13'; Calvo (yellow card) 28'; Duda (yellow card) 58'; Rodák (yellow card) 67'; Al-Ghannam 82'	Stadium: Al-Taawoun Club Stadium; Attendance: 1,944; Referee: Majed Al-Shamrani

25 September 2025 4	Al-Khaleej	0–1	Al-Taawoun	Dammam
18:10	Rebocho (yellow card) 36'	Report	Hawsawi (yellow card) 80'; Barrow 87'	Stadium: Prince Mohamed bin Fahd Stadium; Attendance: 1,423; Referee: Abdullah Al-Kharboush

19 October 2025 5	Al-Taawoun	6–1	Damac	Buraidah
18:10	Al-Ahmed 11'; Mandash 13'; Harkass 53' (o.g.); Martínez 68'; Al-Hurayji 87'; Faivre 88'	Report	Vada 31', (yellow card) 55'; H. Al-Ghamdi (red card) 40'; Kaiki (red card) 59'	Stadium: King Abdullah Sports City; Attendance: 4,037; Referee: Mohammed Al-Hoaish

23 October 2025 6	Al-Fayha	1–2	Al-Taawoun	Al Majma'ah
18:00	Benzia (yellow card) 18'; Smalling 60'; Al-Khaibari (yellow card) 77'	Report	Fulgini 26'; Mahzari 39'; Flávio (yellow card) 45+4'; Al-Mufarrij (yellow card) 90'	Stadium: Al-Majma'ah Sports City Stadium; Attendance: 1,530; Referee: Abdullah Al-Owaidan

1 November 2025 7	Al-Taawoun	2–0	Al-Qadsiah	Buraidah
16:30	Al-Ahmed 57'; Fulgini 66'; Flávio (yellow card) 90+3'	Report	Weigl (yellow card) 89'	Stadium: King Abdullah Sports City; Attendance: 6,119; Referee: Nikola Dabanović (Montenegro)

7 November 2025 8	Al-Fateh	2–5	Al-Taawoun	Al-Hasa
17:35	Saâdane (yellow card) 8'; Fernandes (yellow card) 13'; Al-Zubaidi (yellow card) 69'; Vargas 77'; Batna 90+2' (pen.); Baattiah (yellow card) 90+5'	Report	Martínez 14', 33', 62'; Mahzari (yellow card) 17'; Hugo (yellow card) 38'; Zambrano 41'; Al-Kuwaykibi 72'; Al-Shoeil (yellow card) 90+4'	Stadium: Maydan Tamweel Aloula; Attendance: 6,357; Referee: Abdullah Zarban

23 November 2025 9	Al-Taawoun	1–1	Neom	Buraidah
20:30	El Mahdioui (yellow card) 39'; Al-Ahmed (yellow card) 72', (goal) 90+17'; Girotto (yellow card) 90+3'; Al-Alaeli (yellow card) 90+19'	Report	Doucouré (yellow card) 33'; Abdi (yellow card) 87'; Benrahma 90+5' (pen.); Noor (yellow card) 90+9'	Stadium: Al-Taawoun Club Stadium; Attendance: 5,050; Referee: Khaled Al-Ahmari

26 December 2025 11	Al-Kholood	0–2	Al-Taawoun	Ar Rass
18:00		Report	Al-Mufarrij (yellow card) 9' (yellow-red card) 90+4'; Zambrano 22'; Troost-Ekong 75' (o.g.)	Stadium: Al-Hazem Club Stadium; Attendance: 1,895; Referee: Abdullah Al-Shehri

29 December 2025 12	Al-Taawoun	1–0	Al-Najma	Buraidah
20:30	Al-Kuwaykibi (yellow card) 40'; Martínez (yellow card) 60', (goal) 85'; El Mahdioui (yellow card) 74'	Report		Stadium: Al-Taawoun Club Stadium; Attendance: 4,294; Referee: Ali Al-Qahtani

3 January 2026 13	Al-Ittihad	1–0	Al-Taawoun	Jeddah
20:30	Al-Shanqeeti 50'; Sharahili (yellow card) 56'	Report	Sémbène (yellow card) 59'	Stadium: Prince Abdullah Al-Faisal Sports City Stadium; Attendance: 11,141; Referee: Mohammed Al-Ismail

9 January 2026 14	Al-Taawoun	2–0	Al-Shabab	Buraidah
18:05	Martínez 27' (pen.); Fulgini 45+4'; Al-Mufarrij (yellow card) 82'	Report	Carlos (yellow card) 2'; Al-Shuwayrikh (red card) 18'; Hernández (yellow card) 34'; H. Al-Sibyani (yellow card) 54'; Hoedt (yellow card) 86'; Matuq (red card) 90+6'	Stadium: Al-Taawoun Club Stadium; Attendance: 4,294; Referee: Majed Al-Shamrani

14 January 2026 15	Al-Ahli	2–1	Al-Taawoun	Jeddah
20:30	Demiral (yellow card) 31'; Millot (yellow card) 49'; Ibañez (yellow card) 56' (yellow-red card) 83'; Hawsawi 62'; Toney 90+14' (pen.)	Report	Al-Ahmed (yellow card) 26'; El Mahdioui (yellow card) 31'; Martínez 45+1' (pen.), (yellow card) 90+5'; Al-Mufarrij (yellow card) 90+3'	Stadium: Alinma Stadium; Attendance: 32,612; Referee: Mohammed Al-Hoaish

18 January 2026 16	Al-Riyadh	1–3	Al-Taawoun	Riyadh
20:30	Al-Harfi (yellow card) 17'; Haroun (yellow card) 21'; Tozé 63'	Report	Martínez 10', 45+8' (pen.), 66'; Al-Mufarrij (yellow card) 23' (yellow-red card) 41'; Al-Ahmed (yellow card) 30'; Hugo (yellow card) 34'; Al-Qahtani (yellow card) 90+8'	Stadium: Prince Faisal bin Fahd Sports City Stadium; Attendance: 592; Referee: Khalid Al-Turais

22 January 2026 17	Al-Taawoun	2–2	Al-Hazem	Buraidah
18:15	Martínez 23', 85'; Al-Alaeli (yellow card) 51'	Report	Martins 49'; Al-Shammari 55'; Al-Rashed (yellow card) 58'	Stadium: Al-Taawoun Club Stadium; Attendance: 3,501; Referee: Ali Al-Qahtani

26 January 2026 18	Al-Nassr	1–0	Al-Taawoun	Riyadh
20:30	Al-Nasser (yellow card) 10'; Brozović (yellow card) 33'; Al-Dossari 45' (o.g.); Al-Khaibari (yellow card) 45+5'; Simakan (yellow card) 90+1'; Boushal (yellow card) 90+4'	Report	Al-Mufarrij (yellow card) 31'; Al-Alaeli (yellow card) 46'; Al-Ahmed (yellow card) 90+1'; Mahzari (yellow card) 90+4'; El Mahdioui (yellow card) 90+6'	Stadium: Al-Awwal Park; Attendance: 15,425; Referee: Majed Al-Shamrani

30 January 2026 19	Al-Taawoun	1–0	Al-Okhdood	Buraidah
16:50	Sémbène (yellow card) 35'; Al-Qahtani 58'; Martínez (yellow card) 83'	Report	Al-Rubaie (yellow card) 6'; Asiri (yellow card) 31'; Ashi (yellow card) 86'	Stadium: Al-Taawoun Club Stadium; Attendance: 4,069; Referee: Sami Al-Jurays

3 February 2026 20	Al-Ettifaq	1–0	Al-Taawoun	Dammam
19:30	João Costa (yellow card) 23'; Calvo (yellow card) 43'; Wijnaldum 71'; Ali (yellow card) 80'; Rodák (yellow card) 89'; Al-Khateeb (yellow card) 90+4'	Report	Victor Hugo (yellow card) 38'	Stadium: EGO STADIUM; Attendance: 2,313; Referee: (Saudi Arabia) Abdullah Khalid Al-Khurbush

7 February 2026 21	Al-Taawoun	1–1	Al-Khaleej	Buraidah
17:30	Martínez 49' (yellow card) 63'; Al-Rashidi (yellow card) 90+7'	Report	King 20' (yellow card) 59'; Assiri (yellow card) 69'; Al Hamsal (yellow card) 90'	Stadium: Al-Taawoun Stadium; Attendance: 3,680; Referee: (Saudi Arabia) Mohammed Abu Shaqara

12 February 2026 22	Damac	2–1	Al-Taawoun	Khamis Mushait
17:45	Abdullah (yellow card) 25'; Méïté 34' 82'; Arielson (yellow card) 45+3'	Report	Biel 14'; Victor Hugo (yellow card) 46'; Martínez (yellow card) 60'; Al-Mufarrij (yellow card) 74'	Stadium: Damac Club Stadium; Attendance: 2,318; Referee: (Saudi Arabia) Abdullah Al Owaydan

19 December 2025 10	Al-Taawoun	v	Al-Hilal	Buraidah
20:30				Stadium: King Abdullah Sports City

=== King's Cup ===
All times are local, AST (UTC+3).

21 September 2025 Round of 32	Al-Faisaly	0–4	Al-Taawoun	Al Majma'ah
21:00	Issa (yellow card) 24'; Barnawi (yellow card) 25'; Silva (yellow card) 63'	Report	Mandash 4', 68'; Barrow 21', 89', (yellow card) 48'; Al-Mufarrij (yellow card) 52'	Stadium: Al Majma'ah Sports City Stadium; Referee: Abdulsamad Bakri

27 October 2025 Round of 16	Al-Khaleej	1–1 (a.e.t.) (5–3 p)	Al-Taawoun	Dammam
17:35	King 8'; Al-Hafith (yellow card) 21'	Report	Al-Mufarrij (yellow card) 15'; Martínez 24'; Girotto (yellow card) 45+2'	Stadium: Prince Mohamed bin Fahd Stadium; Referee: Shukri Al-Hanfoush
	Penalties
	Al-Amri (penalty scored); Masouras (penalty scored); Hawsawi (penalty scored); Al Haydar (penalty scored); Kourbelis (penalty scored)		(penalty scored) El Mahdioui; (penalty scored) Adam; (penalty scored) Girotto; (penalty missed) Al-Ahmed

== Statistics ==
=== Appearances ===
Last updated on 30 January 2026.

No.	Pos	Nat	Player	Total		Pro League		King's Cup	
No.	Pos	Nat	Player	Apps	Goals	Apps	Goals	Apps	Goals
Goalkeepers
1	GK	(Brazil) BRA	Mailson	19	0	17	0	2	0
13	GK	(Saudi Arabia) KSA	Abdulquddus Atiah	1	0	1	0	0	0
25	GK	(Saudi Arabia) KSA	Abdulrahman Al-Senaid	0	0	0	0	0	0
Defenders
2	DF	(Saudi Arabia) KSA	Meshal Al-Alaeli	4	0	2+2	0	0	0
3	DF	(Brazil) BRA	Andrei Girotto	15	0	13	0	2	0
5	DF	(Saudi Arabia) KSA	Mohammed Mahzari	20	1	18	1	2	0
23	DF	(Saudi Arabia) KSA	Waleed Al-Ahmed	17	4	15	4	2	0
24	DF	(Senegal) SEN	Moustapha Sémbène	4	0	2+2	0	0	0
26	DF	(Saudi Arabia) KSA	Ibrahim Al-Shoeil	1	0	0+1	0	0	0
32	DF	(Saudi Arabia) KSA	Muteb Al-Mufarrij	17	0	14+1	0	2	0
55	DF	(Saudi Arabia) KSA	Mohammed Al-Dossari	13	0	7+5	0	0+1	0
66	DF	(Saudi Arabia) KSA	Bassam Al-Hurayji	10	1	3+6	1	0+1	0
Midfielders
6	MF	(Brazil) BRA	Victor Hugo	14	0	7+5	0	1+1	0
7	MF	(Saudi Arabia) KSA	Mohammed Al-Kuwaykibi	15	2	10+4	2	0+1	0
8	MF	(Brazil) BRA	Flávio Medeiros	15	0	13	0	2	0
11	MF	(France) FRA	Angelo Fulgini	16	3	14	3	2	0
15	MF	(Saudi Arabia) KSA	Mohammed Al-Qahtani	4	1	1+3	1	0	0
17	MF	(Saudi Arabia) KSA	Mohammed Al-Aqel	7	0	1+6	0	0	0
18	MF	(Netherlands) NED	Aschraf El Mahdioui	19	0	17	0	2	0
28	MF	(Saudi Arabia) KSA	Turki Al-Shaifan	0	0	0	0	0	0
29	MF	(Saudi Arabia) KSA	Ahmed Bahusayn	11	0	1+9	0	0+1	0
43	MF	(Saudi Arabia) KSA	Nawaf Al-Hawairy	0	0	0	0	0	0
44	MF	(Saudi Arabia) KSA	Abdulmalik Al-Marwani	1	0	0+1	0	0	0
77	MF	(Saudi Arabia) KSA	Abdulelah Hawsawi	11	0	1+8	0	0+2	0
Forwards
9	FW	(Saudi Arabia) KSA	Abdulfattah Adam	14	0	0+13	0	0+1	0
10	FW	(Colombia) COL	Roger Martínez	20	15	18	14	2	1
19	FW	(Ecuador) ECU	Cristhoper Zambrano	14	2	6+6	2	0+2	0
99	FW	(The Gambia) GAM	Musa Barrow	6	5	5	3	1	2
Players sent out on loan this season
16	DF	(Venezuela) VEN	Renné Rivas	1	0	1	0	0	0
Player who made an appearance this season but left the club
14	DF	(Saudi Arabia) KSA	Fahad Al-Jumayah	1	0	0+1	0	0	0
21	MF	(France) FRA	Romain Faivre	5	1	1+4	1	0	0
27	MF	(Saudi Arabia) KSA	Sultan Mandash	15	4	10+3	2	2	2

=== Goalscorers ===
Rank	No.	Pos	Nat	Name	Pro League	King's Cup	Total
1	10	FW	(Colombia)	Roger Martínez	14	1	15
2	99	FW	(The Gambia)	Musa Barrow	3	2	5
3	23	DF	(Saudi Arabia)	Waleed Al-Ahmed	4	0	4
3	27	MF	(Saudi Arabia)	Sultan Mandash	2	2	4
5	11	MF	(France)	Angelo Fulgini	3	0	3
6	7	MF	(Saudi Arabia)	Mohammed Al-Kuwaykibi	2	0	2
6	19	FW	(Ecuador)	Cristhoper Zambrano	2	0	2
8	5	DF	(Saudi Arabia)	Mohammed Mahzari	1	0	1
8	15	MF	(Saudi Arabia)	Mohammed Al-Qahtani	1	0	1
8	21	MF	(France)	Romain Faivre	1	0	1
8	66	DF	(Saudi Arabia)	Bassam Al-Hurayji	1	0	1
Own goal					2	0	2
Total					36	5	41

Last Updated: 30 January 2026

=== Assists ===
Rank	No.	Pos	Nat	Name	Pro League	King's Cup	Total
1	11	MF	(France)	Angelo Fulgini	7	1	8
2	7	MF	(Saudi Arabia)	Mohammed Al-Kuwaykibi	5	0	5
3	99	FW	(The Gambia)	Musa Barrow	3	1	4
4	27	MF	(Saudi Arabia)	Sultan Mandash	3	0	3
5	10	FW	(Colombia)	Roger Martínez	2	0	2
6	8	MF	(Brazil)	Flávio Medeiros	1	0	1
6	9	FW	(Saudi Arabia)	Abdulfattah Adam	1	0	1
6	19	FW	(Ecuador)	Cristhoper Zambrano	1	0	1
6	21	MF	(France)	Romain Faivre	1	0	1
6	77	MF	(Saudi Arabia)	Abdulelah Hawsawi	0	1	1
Total					24	3	27

Last Updated: 22 January 2026

=== Clean sheets ===
Rank	No.	Pos	Nat	Name	Pro League	King's Cup	Total
1	1	GK	(Brazil)	Mailson	6	1	7
Total					6	1	7

Last Updated: 30 January 2026
