= 2024–25 Al-Taawoun FC season =

Al-Taawoun
2024–25 season
- Chairman: Saud Al-Rashoodi
- Manager: Rodolfo Arruabarrena (until 9 February); Mohammed Al-Abdali (from 9 February)
- Stadium: King Abdullah Sport City Stadium; Al-Taawoun Club Stadium
- Pro League: 8th
- King Cup: Quarter-finals (knocked out by Al-Qadsiah)
- ACL Two: Semi-finals (knocked out by Sharjah)
- Super Cup: Semi-finals (knocked out by Al-Nassr)
- Top goalscorer: League: Musa Barrow (13); All: Musa Barrow (18)
- Highest home attendance: 16,478 v Al-Hilal; 15 March 2025; Saudi Pro League
- Lowest home attendance: 1,518 v Al-Wehda; 19 April 2025; Saudi Pro League
- Average home league attendance: 5,149
- All statistics correct as of 26 May 2025.

The 2024–25 season was Al-Taawoun's 69th year in their history and 15th consecutive season in the Pro League. The club participated in the Pro League, the King's Cup, the Saudi Super Cup, and the AFC Champions League Two.

The season covers the period from 1 July 2024 to 30 June 2025.

== Players ==
=== Squad information ===
As of 1 February 2025

Note: Flags indicate national team as defined under FIFA eligibility rules; some limited exceptions apply. Players may hold more than one non-FIFA nationality.

No.	Pos.	Nation	Player
1	GK	BRA	Mailson
2	DF	KSA	Ali Sharahili
3	DF	BRA	Andrei Girotto
5	DF	KSA	Mohammed Mahzari (on loan from Al-Ettifaq)
6	MF	KSA	Sultan Al-Farhan (on loan from Al-Ittihad)
7	MF	KSA	Mohammed Al-Kuwaykibi
8	MF	KSA	Saad Al-Nasser
9	FW	KSA	Abdulfattah Adam
13	GK	KSA	Abdulquddus Atiah
14	DF	KSA	Fahad Al-Jumayah
16	DF	VEN	Renné Rivas (on loan from Caracas)
18	MF	MAR	Aschraf El Mahdioui
19	MF	BOL	Lucas Chávez (on loan from Bolívar)
21	DF	KSA	Fahad Al-Abdulrazzaq
23	DF	KSA	Waleed Al-Ahmed
24	MF	MAR	Flávio Medeiros

No.	Pos.	Nation	Player
25	GK	KSA	Abdulrahman Al-Senaid
26	DF	KSA	Ibrahim Al-Shoeil
27	MF	KSA	Sultan Mandash
28	MF	KSA	Turki Al-Shaifan
29	MF	KSA	Ahmed Bahusayn
31	GK	KSA	Mohammed Al-Dhulayfi
32	DF	KSA	Muteb Al-Mufarrij
33	FW	KSA	Anas Al-Ghamdi
38	FW	COL	Roger Martínez
44	MF	KSA	Abdulmalik Al-Marwani
70	MF	MAR	Abdelhamid Sabiri (on loan from Fiorentina)
76	MF	MAR	Fayçal Fajr
90	MF	KSA	Hattan Bahebri
93	DF	KSA	Awn Al-Saluli
98	GK	KSA	Abdulrahman Al-Ghamdi
99	FW	GAM	Musa Barrow

=== Out on loan ===
Note: Flags indicate national team as defined under FIFA eligibility rules; some limited exceptions apply. Players may hold more than one non-FIFA nationality.

No.	Pos.	Nation	Player
13	MF	KSA	Abdulrahman Al-Mughais (at Al-Hilaliyah until 30 June 2025)
43	DF	KSA	Emad Al-Qunaian (at Hajer until 30 June 2025)
67	MF	KSA	Mohammed Baker (at Al-Jabalain until 30 June 2025)
91	MF	KSA	Rakan Al-Tulayhi (at Al-Arabi until 30 June 2025)

No.	Pos.	Nation	Player
—	DF	KSA	Adeeb Al-Hassan (at Al-Arabi until 30 June 2025)
—	MF	KSA	Abdulmalek Al-Shammeri (at Al-Orobah until 30 June 2025)
—	FW	KSA	Bassem Al-Oraini (at Al-Kholood until 30 June 2025)

== Transfers and loans ==
=== Transfers in ===
Entry date	Position	No.	Player	From club	Fee	Ref.
30 June 2024	GK	50	(Saudi Arabia) Mohammed Al-Dawsari	(Saudi Arabia) Al-Bukiryah	End of loan	
30 June 2024	DF	12	(Saudi Arabia) Sulaiman Hazazi	(Saudi Arabia) Al-Qaisumah	End of loan	
30 June 2024	DF	43	(Saudi Arabia) Emad Al-Qunaian	(Saudi Arabia) Al-Najma	End of loan	
30 June 2024	MF	13	(Saudi Arabia) Abdulrahman Al-Mughais	(Saudi Arabia) Al-Saqer	End of loan	
30 June 2024	MF	21	(Saudi Arabia) Abdullah Al-Hammad	(Saudi Arabia) Al-Najma	End of loan	
30 June 2024	FW	70	(Saudi Arabia) Rayan Al-Johani	(Saudi Arabia) Al-Bukiryah	End of loan	
30 June 2024	FW	–	(Saudi Arabia) Hussain Al-Moeini	(Saudi Arabia) Jeddah	End of loan	
1 July 2024	MF	7	(Saudi Arabia) Mohammed Al-Kuwaykibi	(Saudi Arabia) Al-Ettifaq	Free	
1 July 2024	MF	27	(Saudi Arabia) Sultan Mandash	(Saudi Arabia) Al-Fayha	Free	
11 July 2024	DF	32	(Saudi Arabia) Muteb Al-Mufarrij	(Saudi Arabia) Al-Hilal	Free	
19 July 2024	DF	14	(Saudi Arabia) Fahad Al-Jumayah	(Saudi Arabia) Abha	Undisclosed	
29 July 2024	MF	24	(Brazil) Flávio Medeiros	(Turkey) Trabzonspor	Free	
31 July 2024	GK	13	(Saudi Arabia) Abdulquddus Atiah	(Saudi Arabia) Al-Wehda	Free	
20 August 2024	MF	76	(Morocco) Fayçal Fajr	(Saudi Arabia) Al-Wehda	Free	
3 September 2024	MF	90	(Saudi Arabia) Hattan Bahebri	(Saudi Arabia) Al-Shabab	Free	
14 January 2025	FW	38	(Colombia) Roger Martínez	(Argentina) Racing Club	Free	

=== Loans in ===
Start date	End date	Position	No.	Player	To club	Fee	Ref.
17 July 2024	End of season	MF	6	(Saudi Arabia) Sultan Al-Farhan	(Saudi Arabia) Al-Ittihad	None	
28 August 2024	End of season	DF	16	(Venezuela) Renné Rivas	(Venezuela) Caracas	None	
3 September 2024	End of season	MF	19	(Bolivia) Lucas Chávez	(Bolivia) Bolívar	None	
31 January 2025	End of season	MF	70	(Morocco) Abdelhamid Sabiri	(Italy) Fiorentina	None	

=== Transfers out ===
Exit date	Position	No.	Player	To club	Fee	Ref.
30 June 2024	GK	28	(Saudi Arabia) Saleh Al-Ohaymid	(Saudi Arabia) Al-Ittihad	End of loan	
30 June 2024	DF	42	(Saudi Arabia) Muath Faqeehi	(Saudi Arabia) Al-Hilal	End of loan	
30 June 2024	MF	19	(Argentina) Cristian Guanca	(Saudi Arabia) Al-Shabab	End of loan	
30 June 2024	MF	22	(Saudi Arabia) Mohammed Al-Kuwaykibi	(Saudi Arabia) Al-Ettifaq	End of loan	
30 June 2024	MF	24	(Brazil) Flávio Medeiros	(Turkey) Trabzonspor	End of loan	
30 June 2024	MF	55	(Saudi Arabia) Saleh Aboulshamat	(Saudi Arabia) Al-Qadsiah	End of loan	
12 July 2024	DF	15	(Saudi Arabia) Abdulmalik Al-Oyayari	(Saudi Arabia) Neom	$10,600,000	
15 July 2024	DF	6	(Saudi Arabia) Mohammed Al-Ghamdi	(Saudi Arabia) Al-Faisaly	Free	
19 July 2024	MF	20	(Saudi Arabia) Nawaf Al-Rashwodi	(Saudi Arabia) Al-Najma	Free	
1 August 2024	FW	–	(Saudi Arabia) Hussain Al-Moeini	(Saudi Arabia) Jeddah	Free	
3 August 2024	DF	12	(Saudi Arabia) Sulaiman Hazazi	(Saudi Arabia) Al-Zulfi	Free	
4 August 2024	GK	–	(Saudi Arabia) Khaled Al-Rashidi	(Saudi Arabia) Al-Saqer	Free	
5 August 2024	MF	–	(Saudi Arabia) Farid Hussain	(Saudi Arabia) Al-Saqer	Free	
14 August 2024	MF	21	(Saudi Arabia) Abdullah Al-Hammad	(Saudi Arabia) Hajer	Free	
15 August 2024	DF	40	(Saudi Arabia) Hassan Rabee	(Saudi Arabia) Al-Ain	Free	
16 August 2024	MF	–	(Saudi Arabia) Ziyad Al-Refaie	(Saudi Arabia) Al-Ain	Free	
21 August 2024	GK	31	(Saudi Arabia) Ammar Al-Ammar	(Saudi Arabia) Al-Tai	Free	
7 September 2024	FW	97	(Saudi Arabia) Khalid Al-Muntashiri	(Saudi Arabia) Wej	Free	
13 September 2024	MF	17	(Saudi Arabia) Ahmed Ashraf	(Saudi Arabia) Al-Jabalain	Free	
25 October 2024	FW	70	(Saudi Arabia) Rayan Al-Johani	(Saudi Arabia) Al-Qala	Free	
22 January 2025	MF	10	(Brazil) Mateus Castro	(Japan) Nagoya Grampus	Free	
29 January 2025	FW	11	(Brazil) João Pedro	(United Arab Emirates) Al-Wasl	Free	
31 January 2025	MF	7	(Saudi Arabia) Sattam Al-Rouqi	(Saudi Arabia) Al-Fayha	Free	

=== Loans out ===
Start date	End date	Position	No.	Player	To club	Fee	Ref.
11 August 2024	End of season	MF	91	(Saudi Arabia) Rakan Al-Tulayhi	(Saudi Arabia) Al-Arabi	None	
13 August 2024	End of season	DF	43	(Saudi Arabia) Emad Al-Qunaian	(Saudi Arabia) Hajer	None	
20 August 2024	30 January 2025	MF	7	(Saudi Arabia) Sattam Al-Rouqi	(Saudi Arabia) Al-Orobah	None	
23 August 2024	End of season	DF	9	(Saudi Arabia) Abdulmalek Al-Shammeri	(Saudi Arabia) Al-Orobah	None	
30 August 2024	End of season	DF	–	(Saudi Arabia) Adeeb Al-Hassan	(Saudi Arabia) Al-Arabi	None	
3 September 2024	End of season	FW	–	(Saudi Arabia) Bassem Al-Oraini	(Saudi Arabia) Al-Kholood	None	
13 September 2024	End of season	MF	67	(Saudi Arabia) Mohammed Baker	(Saudi Arabia) Al-Jabalain	None	
15 September 2024	End of season	MF	13	(Saudi Arabia) Abdulrahman Al-Mughais	(Saudi Arabia) Al-Hilaliyah	None	

== Pre-season ==
23 July 2024 Friendly	Al-Taawoun (Saudi Arabia)	0–2	(Ukraine) Zorya Luhansk	Gorišnica, Slovenia
17:30 CEST		Report	Bašić 59'; Gorbach 73'	Stadium: Športni Center Gorišnica

27 July 2024 Friendly	Al-Taawoun (Saudi Arabia)	1–1	(Slovenia) Triglav Kranj	Kidričevo, Slovenia
17:00 CEST	Pedro 47'	Report	80'	Stadium: Aluminij Sports Park

3 August 2024 Friendly	Al-Taawoun (Saudi Arabia)	0–0	(Saudi Arabia) Damac	Gornja Radgona, Slovenia
16:00 CEST		Report		Stadium: TŠC Trate

== Competitions ==
=== Overview ===
Competition	Record							
Competition	Pld	W	D	L	GF	GA	GD	Win %
Pro League	34	12	9	13	40	39	+1	35.29
King Cup	3	2	0	1	4	5	−1	66.67
ACL Two	12	6	4	2	20	14	+6	50.00
Super Cup	1	0	0	1	0	2	−2	0.00
Total	50	20	13	17	64	60	+4	40.00

Updated to match played 26 May 2025
Source: Competitions

=== Pro League ===
==== League table ====
Pos	Team	Pld	W	D	L	GF	GA	GD	Pts	Qualification or relegation
6	Al-Shabab	34	18	6	10	65	41	+24	60	Qualification for the AGCFF Gulf Club Champions League group stage (Note: Al-Qadsiah withdrew from AGCFF Gulf Club Champions League, the spot was passed to the next highest-placed team who did not qualified to the Asian club competitions.)
7	Al-Ettifaq	34	14	8	12	44	45	−1	50	
8	Al-Taawoun	34	12	9	13	40	39	+1	45	
9	Al-Kholood	34	12	4	18	42	64	−22	40	
10	Al-Fateh	34	11	6	17	47	61	−14	39	

Source: SPL
Rules for classification: 1) Points; 2) Head-to-head points; 3) Head-to-head goal difference; 4) Total goal difference; 5) Total goals scored; 6) Fair-play points
(Note: Head-to-head record is used only after all the matches between the teams in question have been played).

==== Results summary ====
Overall								Home						Away					
Pld	W	D	L	GF	GA	GD	Pts	W	D	L	GF	GA	GD	W	D	L	GF	GA	GD
34	12	9	13	40	39	+1	45	7	5	5	24	21	+3	5	4	8	16	18	−2

Last updated: 26 May 2025.
Source: Saudi Pro League

==== Results by round ====
Round	1	2	3	4	5	6	7	8	9	10	11	12	13	14	15	16	17	18	19	20	21	22	23	24	25	26	27	28	29	30	31	32	33	34
Ground	H	A	H	A	H	H	A	A	H	H	A	A	H	A	H	A	H	A	H	A	H	A	A	H	H	A	A	H	H	A	H	A	H	A
Result	W	L	W	L	D	W	D	L	D	W	L	W	L	W	D	L	D	D	L	W	D	L	W	W	L	W	D	L	W	L	L	D	W	L
Position	7	9	5	9	8	5	6	9	8	7	8	8	9	8	8	9	9	9	10	8	8	10	8	8	8	7	7	8	7	8	8	8	8	8

Updated to match(es) played on 26 May 2025. Source: Saudi Pro League
A = Away; H = Home; W = Win; D = Draw; L = Loss

==== Matches ====
All times are local, AST (UTC+3).

Win Draw Loss Postponed

22 August 2024 1	Al-Taawoun	1–0	Al-Fayha	Buraidah
19:10	Al-Shoeil (red card) 81'; Adam 90+5', (yellow card) 90+6'	Report	Al-Rashidi (yellow card) 28'; Abdi (yellow card) 45'; Al-Dowaish (yellow card) 66'	Stadium: Al-Taawoun Club Stadium; Attendance: 1,606; Referee: Abdullah Al-Shehri

29 August 2024 2	Al-Ittihad	2–1	Al-Taawoun	Jeddah
21:00	Al-Sqoor (yellow card) 14'; Diaby (yellow card) 25'; Benzema 70'; Aouar 90+8' (pen.), (yellow card) 90+9'	Report	Al-Jumayah (yellow card) 34'; Barrow 59'; Al-Saluli (yellow card) 66' (yellow-red card) 90+5'; Al-Mufarrij (yellow card) 90+7'; El Mahdioui (yellow card) 90+9'	Stadium: King Abdullah Sports City; Attendance: 26,977; Referee: Ivan Kružliak (Slovakia)

13 September 2024 3	Al-Taawoun	2–0	Al-Khaleej	Buraidah
18:50	Barrow 18'; El Mahdioui (yellow card) 21'; Al-Mufarrij (yellow card) 43'; Al-Jumayah (yellow card) 45'; Flávio (yellow card) 45+5'; Mandash 51'; Girotto (yellow card) 53'	Report	Martins (yellow card) 27'; Kourbelis (yellow card) 45+1'; Al-Fahad (yellow card) 59'	Stadium: Al-Taawoun Club Stadium; Attendance: 2,380; Referee: Khaled Al-Teris

21 September 2024 4	Al-Shabab	1–0	Al-Taawoun	Riyadh
18:30	Hamdallah 25' (pen.); Kanabah (yellow card) 45'; Hoedt (yellow card) 83'	Report	Flávio (yellow card) 23'; Al-Mufarrij (yellow card) 30'; Al-Jumayah (yellow card) 85'; Mandash (yellow card) 90+7'	Stadium: Al-Shabab Club Stadium; Attendance: 5,943; Referee: Mohammed Al-Ismail

29 September 2024 5	Al-Taawoun	1–1	Al-Ettifaq	Buraidah
21:00	Pedro 13'; Al-Jumayah (yellow card) 19'; Flávio (yellow card) 41' (yellow-red card) 49'	Report	Al-Otaibi (yellow card) 60'; Radif (yellow card) 80'; Dembélé 90+3'; Toko Ekambi (yellow card) 90+6'	Stadium: Al-Taawoun Club Stadium; Attendance: 2,483; Referee: Faisal Al-Blwi

5 October 2024 6	Al-Taawoun	2–0	Al-Fateh	Buraidah
18:25	Mandash (yellow card) 38'; Barrow 45+3'; Pedro 81'	Report	Bendebka (yellow card) 45+1'; Djaniny (yellow card) 72'	Stadium: Al-Taawoun Club Stadium; Attendance: 2,214; Referee: Majed Al-Shamrani

19 October 2024 7	Damac	2–2	Al-Taawoun	Khamis Mushait
18:20	Diallo 60', (yellow card) 81'; Nkoudou 77', (yellow card) 78'	Report	Barrow 27'; Girotto (yellow card) 80'; Adam (yellow card) 81', (goal) 85'; Al-Ahmed (yellow card) 90+3'; Flávio (yellow card) 90+10'	Stadium: Damac Club Stadium; Attendance: 3,015; Referee: Abdulsamad Bakri

26 October 2024 8	Al-Hilal	2–0	Al-Taawoun	Riyadh
21:00	Mitrović 15'; S. Al-Dawsari (yellow card) 36'; Milinković-Savić (yellow card) 57', (goal) 62'	Report		Stadium: Kingdom Arena; Attendance: 16,321; Referee: Andrés Rojas (Colombia)

2 November 2024 9	Al-Taawoun	1–1	Al-Kholood	Buraidah
17:55	Barrow 32'; Al-Saluli (yellow card) 90+4'	Report	Maolida 18'; Al-Shamrani (yellow card) 55'; Al-Safri (yellow card) 60'; Al-Hammami (yellow card) 80'	Stadium: Al-Taawoun Club Stadium; Attendance: 2,661; Referee: Khalid Al-Teris

9 November 2024 10	Al-Taawoun	1–0	Al-Okhdood	Buraidah
20:00	Flávio (yellow card) 89'; Barrow 90+3'; Adam (yellow card) 90+6'	Report	Lowe (yellow card) 13'; Koné (yellow card) 32'; Al-Rubaie (yellow card) 90+5'; Petros (yellow card) 90+5'	Stadium: Al-Taawoun Club Stadium; Attendance: 2,745; Referee: Shukri Al-Hanfoush

23 November 2024 11	Al-Wehda	1–0	Al-Taawoun	Mecca
18:15	Bacuna (yellow card) 21'; Noor 41'	Report	Al-Jumayah (yellow card) 53'	Stadium: King Abdulaziz Sports City; Attendance: 444; Referee: Mohammed Abu Shaqarah

30 November 2024 12	Al-Raed	0–1	Al-Taawoun	Buraidah
16:20	Al-Jayzani (yellow card) 37'; Qasmi (yellow card) 73'; Al-Amri (yellow card) 84'	Report	Girotto (yellow card) 45+3'; Adam 78', (yellow card) 79'; El Mahdioui (yellow card) 90+8'	Stadium: King Abdullah Sports City; Attendance: 9,004; Referee: Mohammed Al-Hoaish

7 December 2024 13	Al-Taawoun	2–4	Al-Ahli	Buraidah
20:00	Pedro 21'; Barrow 23'; Al-Saluli (yellow card) 79'	Report	Ibañez 45+8'; Al-Buraikan 52'; Firmino 63'; Mahrez 73'	Stadium: King Abdullah Sports City; Attendance: 5,118; Referee: Danny Makkelie (Netherlands)

11 January 2025 14	Al-Qadsiah	0–3	Al-Taawoun	Dammam
17:40	Aboulshamat (yellow card) 17'; Al-Ammar (yellow card) 46'	Report	Barrow 1', 75', (yellow card) 12'; Fajr (yellow card) 15'; Al-Ahmed 33'; Mahzari (yellow card) 45+4' (yellow-red card) 51'	Stadium: Prince Mohamed bin Fahd Stadium; Attendance: 5,158; Referee: Daniel Siebert (Germany)

17 January 2025 15	Al-Taawoun	1–1	Al-Nassr	Buraidah
20:00	Al-Nasser 45+5'; Adam (yellow card) 79'	Report	Al-Hassan (yellow card) 37'; Brozović (yellow card) 40'; Laporte 64'; Boushal (yellow card) 70'; Maran (yellow card) 90+11'	Stadium: King Abdullah Sports City; Attendance: 13,819; Referee: Wilmar Roldán (Colombia)

21 January 2025 16	Al-Riyadh	1–0	Al-Taawoun	Riyadh
18:10	Barbet (yellow card) 68'; Konaté 90+11' (pen.)	Report	Al-Jumayah (yellow card) 17'; Al-Saluli (yellow card) 26' (yellow-red card) 90+13'; Mandash (yellow card) 59' (yellow-red card) 77'; Al-Ahmed (yellow card) 90+7'	Stadium: Prince Faisal bin Fahd Sports City Stadium; Attendance: 150; Referee: Mohammed Al-Ismail

26 January 2025 17	Al-Taawoun	0–0	Al-Orobah	Buraidah
18:20	Al-Ahmed (red card) 50'	Report	Al-Maqati (yellow card) 70'; Al-Qarni (yellow card) 90+1'; Al Somah (yellow card) 90+3'	Stadium: Al-Taawoun Club Stadium; Attendance: 1,813; Referee: Shukri Al-Hanfoush

31 January 2025 18	Al-Fayha	0–0	Al-Taawoun	Al Majma'ah
16:45	Smalling (yellow card) 38'; Sakala (yellow card) 89'	Report	Girotto (yellow card) 22'	Stadium: Al Majma'ah Sports City; Attendance: 1,042; Referee: Fareeh Al-Jaloud

6 February 2025 19	Al-Taawoun	1–2	Al-Ittihad	Buraidah
20:00	Al-Ahmed (yellow card) 31'; Barrow 45+10'; Mahzari (yellow card) 61'; Sabiri (yellow card) 90+4'	Report	Al-Aboud 21', (yellow card) 59'; Benzema 90+5'	Stadium: King Abdullah Sports City; Attendance: 8,886; Referee: Sergey Ivanov (Russia)

15 February 2025 20	Al-Khaleej	0–1	Al-Taawoun	Dammam
16:35	Martins (yellow card) 59'	Report	Sabiri (yellow card) 36', (goal) 90+5'; Al-Ahmed (yellow card) 38'; Mahzari (yellow card) 45+1'	Stadium: Prince Mohamed bin Fahd Stadium; Attendance: 1,490; Referee: Mohammed Abu Shaqarah

22 February 2025 21	Al-Taawoun	2–2	Al-Shabab	Buraidah
17:05	Rivas (yellow card) 29', (goal) 45+2'; Girotto (red card) 45+10'; Al-Mufarrij 70'	Report	Hamdallah 18' (pen.); Hoedt 31'; Al-Juwayr (yellow card) 45+1'; Kamara (yellow card) 49'; Camara (yellow card) 90+2'; Al-Shuwayrikh (yellow card) 90+7'; Bonaventura (yellow card) 90+8'	Stadium: Al-Taawoun Club Stadium; Attendance: 2,476; Referee: Faisal Al-Blwi

26 February 2025 22	Al-Ettifaq	1–0	Al-Taawoun	Dammam
18:15	Wijnaldum 78'; Toko Ekambi (yellow card) 87'	Report	Al-Mufarrij (yellow card) 6'; Al-Ahmed (yellow card) 90+7'	Stadium: EGO Stadium; Attendance: 4,868; Referee: Sultan Al-Harbi

1 March 2025 23	Al-Fateh	1–2	Al-Taawoun	Al-Hasa
22:00	Fernandes (yellow card) 28'; Bendebka 45+3'; Saâdane (yellow card) 88'; Machado (yellow card) 90+2'; Al-Anazi (red card) 90+13'	Report	Rivas (yellow card) 60'; Barrow 69', 90+9'; Adam (yellow card) 78'; Fajr (yellow card) 90+1'; Bahebri (yellow card) 90+1'	Stadium: Al-Fateh Club Stadium; Attendance: 8,574; Referee: Sami Al-Jires

8 March 2025 24	Al-Taawoun	3–0	Damac	Buraidah
22:00	Mandash 2'; Al-Abdulrazzaq (yellow card) 12'; Bahebri 23'; Chávez 37'; Al-Mufarrij (yellow card) 60'; Sabiri (yellow card) 74'	Report	Harisi (red card) 8'	Stadium: Al-Taawoun Club Stadium; Attendance: 2,666; Referee: Mohammed Al-Hoaish

15 March 2025 25	Al-Taawoun	0–2	Al-Hilal	Buraidah
22:00	Rivas (yellow card) 46'	Report	Kanno 12'; Bounou (yellow card) 39'; Leonardo 75'; Al-Tombakti (yellow card) 90+4'	Stadium: King Abdullah Sports City; Attendance: 16,478; Referee: Donatas Rumšas (Lithuania)

4 April 2025 26	Al-Kholood	0–2	Al-Taawoun	Ar Rass
17:30		Report	Martínez 70', (yellow card) 73'; Sabiri 80'; El Mahdioui (yellow card) 88'	Stadium: Al-Hazem Club Stadium; Attendance: 2,685; Referee: Shukri Al-Hanfoush

11 April 2025 27	Al-Okhdood	1–1	Al-Taawoun	Najran
18:55	Bassogog 7'; Petros (yellow card) 77'	Report	Al-Mufarrij (yellow card) 24'; Al-Farhan (yellow card) 45+5'; Fajr (yellow card) 53'; Mandash 79'	Stadium: Prince Hathloul bin Abdulaziz Sports City; Attendance: 804; Referee: Sebastian Gishamer (Austria)

19 April 2025 28	Al-Taawoun	0–2	Al-Wehda	Buraidah
21:00	Al-Mufarrij (yellow card) 20'	Report	Makki (yellow card) 4'; Bguir (yellow card) 11'; Noor 20'; Al-Najei 66'; Al-Salem (yellow card) 90+4'	Stadium: Al-Taawoun Club Stadium; Attendance: 1,518; Referee: Khalid Al-Turais

24 April 2025 29	Al-Taawoun	4–3	Al-Raed	Buraidah
21:00	Girotto 30'; Martínez 40' (pen.), (yellow card) 83'; Al-Yousef 45+6' (o.g.); Al-Ahmed 49'; Sabiri (yellow card) 77'; Rivas (yellow card) 90+10'	Report	Sayoud 22' (pen.); Al-Yousef (yellow card) 37'; Al-Rajeh (yellow card) 48'; Qasmi 54'; El Berkaoui (yellow card) 66'; Gonzalez 74'	Stadium: King Abdullah Sports City; Attendance: 16,277; Referee: Majed Al-Shamrani

7 May 2025 30	Al-Ahli	2–0	Al-Taawoun	Jeddah
19:25	Sulaiman 10'; Toney 31'; Ibañez (yellow card) 83'; Al-Muwallad (yellow card) 90+5'	Report	Mahzari (yellow card) 51'; Mandash (yellow card) 59'; Girotto (yellow card) 90+2'	Stadium: Prince Abdullah Al-Faisal Sports City; Attendance: 12,821; Referee: Sandro Schärer (Switzerland)

11 May 2025 31	Al-Taawoun	0–1	Al-Qadsiah	Buraidah
19:15		Report	Girotto 61' (o.g.); Rashad (yellow card) 80'	Stadium: Al-Taawoun Club Stadium; Attendance: 2,087; Referee: Donatas Rumšas (Lithuania)

16 May 2025 32	Al-Nassr	1–1	Al-Taawoun	Riyadh
21:00	Yahya (yellow card) 47'; Otávio 51'; Brozović (yellow card) 59'; Wesley (yellow card) 90+1'	Report	Mahzari (yellow card) 45+2'; Martínez 70'	Stadium: Al-Awwal Park; Attendance: 9,488; Referee: Rafael Klein (Brazil)

20 May 2025 33	Al-Taawoun	3–2	Al-Riyadh	Buraidah
19:20	Barrow 45+6' (pen.); Bahebri 86'; A. Al-Ghamdi (yellow card) 90+1'; Adam 90+5'	Report	Sali 34'; Selemani 40'	Stadium: Al-Taawoun Club Stadium; Attendance: 2,297; Referee: Fareeh Al-Jaloud

26 May 2025 34	Al-Orobah	3–2	Al-Taawoun	Sakakah
21:00	Zouma 18'; F. Al-Zubaidi 40'; Al-Torais (yellow card) 52'; Al-Rashidi (yellow card) 52'; Masnom (yellow card) 79'; Abu Taha 86'	Report	Martínez 22', 38'; Al-Marwani (yellow card) 90+2'	Stadium: Al Jouf University Stadium; Attendance: 85; Referee: Mohammed Al-Ismail

=== King's Cup ===
All times are local, AST (UTC+3).

22 September 2024 Round of 32	Abha	2–3 (a.e.t.)	Al-Taawoun	Khamis Mushait
21:00	Naji (yellow card) 90+1'; Abdu 90+11' (pen.), 120+3', (yellow card) 120+2'	Report	Flávio 21', (yellow card) 71'; Pedro 92'; Al-Kuwaykibi 99'; Girotto (red card) 111'; Fajr (yellow card) 120+5'	Stadium: Damac Club Stadium; Referee: Abdullah Al-Owaidan

29 October 2024 Round of 16	Al-Nassr	0–1	Al-Taawoun	Riyadh
18:30		Report	Al-Ahmed (yellow card) 34', (goal) 71'; Al-Mufarrij (yellow card) 90+4'; El Mahdioui (yellow card) 90+5'	Stadium: Al-Awwal Park; Attendance: 14,519; Referee: Rade Obrenovič (Slovenia)

7 January 2025 Quarter-finals	Al-Taawoun	0–3	Al-Qadsiah	Buraidah
18:00	Al-Nasser (yellow card) 59'; Fajr (yellow card) 90+3'; Bahebri (yellow card) 90+5'	Report	Aubameyang 34'; Puertas 36'; Quiñones 49'; Nacho (yellow card) 90+6'	Stadium: Al-Raed Club Stadium; Attendance: 3,150; Referee: Radu Petrescu (Romania)

=== Super Cup ===
14 August 2024 Semi-finals	Al-Taawoun	0–2	Al-Nassr	Abha, Saudi Arabia
19:15 UTC+3	Al-Jumayah (yellow card) 3'; Al-Ahmed (yellow card) 29'; Pedro (yellow card) 45+2'	Report	Yahya 8'; Lajami (yellow card) 26'; Ronaldo 57'; Brozović (red card) 90+1'	Stadium: Prince Sultan bin Abdulaziz Sports City; Attendance: 7,213; Referee: Davide Massa (Italy)

=== AFC Champions League Two ===
==== Group stage ====
Pos	Team	Pld	W	D	L	GF	GA	GD	Pts	Qualification	TAA	KHA	AFC	ALT
1	(Saudi Arabia) Al-Taawoun	6	5	0	1	13	6	+7	15	Advance to round of 16	—	2–1	1–2	2–1
2	(Bahrain) Al-Khaldiya	6	4	0	2	14	7	+7	12	Advance to round of 16	2–3	—	4–1	4–0
3	(Iraq) Al-Quwa Al-Jawiya	6	3	0	3	8	9	−1	9		0–1	1–2	—	2–1
4	(Turkmenistan) Altyn Asyr	6	0	0	6	2	15	−13	0		0–4	0–1	0–2	—

Source: AFC
Rules for classification: Tiebreakers

18 September 2024 1	Al-Khaldiya (Bahrain)	2–3	(Saudi Arabia) Al-Taawoun	Riffa, Bahrain
19:00 UTC+3	Al-Aswad 33'; Mendy (yellow card) 37'; Dabo (yellow card) 75'; Abduljabbar 79'	Report	Barrow 1', 29'; Flávio 51'; Girotto (yellow card) 90+5'	Stadium: Bahrain National Stadium; Attendance: 948; Referee: Nasrullo Kabirov (Tajikistan)

2 October 2024 2	Al-Taawoun (Saudi Arabia)	1–2	(Iraq) Al-Quwa Al-Jawiya	Buraidah, Saudi Arabia
21:00 UTC+3	João Pedro 62'	Report	Isaiah 45+1'; Abdul Ameer 48'	Stadium: Al-Taawoun Club Stadium; Attendance: 5,200; Referee: Shen Yinhao (China)

23 October 2024 3	Al-Taawoun (Saudi Arabia)	2–1	(Turkmenistan) Altyn Asyr	Buraidah, Saudi Arabia
21:00 UTC+3	Fajr (yellow card) 41'; Pedro 45+2'; Mandash 47'	Report	Babajanow (yellow card) 28'; Tajivew (yellow card) 45+3'; Myratberdiyýew 58'; Durdyýew (yellow card) 72'	Stadium: Al-Taawoun Club Stadium; Attendance: 4,172; Referee: Jumpei Iida (Japan)

6 November 2024 4	Altyn Asyr (Turkmenistan)	0–4	(Saudi Arabia) Al-Taawoun	Ashgabat, Turkmenistan
19:00 UTC+5	Myratberdiyýew (yellow card) 31'; Hojovow (red card) 61'	Report	Al-Ahmed (yellow card) 10'; Barrow 36', 67'; Mandash 40'; Bahusayn 88'	Stadium: Köpetdag Stadium; Attendance: 11,000; Referee: Pranjal Banerjee (India)

27 November 2024 5	Al-Taawoun (Saudi Arabia)	2–1	(Bahrain) Al-Khaldiya	Buraidah, Saudi Arabia
21:00 UTC+3	Adam 31'; Mandash 55'	Report	Al-Aswad 39'; Mendy (yellow card) 90+1'	Stadium: Al-Taawoun Club Stadium; Attendance: 3,968; Referee: Sadullo Gulmurodi (Tajikistan)

4 December 2024 6	Al-Quwa Al-Jawiya (Iraq)	0–1	(Saudi Arabia) Al-Taawoun	Baghdad, Iraq
17:00 UTC+3	Hanoon (yellow card) 30'; Waleed (yellow card) 78'	Report	Girotto 48'; Al-Shoeil (yellow card) 88'	Stadium: Al-Madina International Stadium; Attendance: 750; Referee: Nasrullo Kabirov (Tajikistan)

==== Knockout phase ====
===== Round of 16 =====
12 February 2025 First leg	Al-Wakrah (Qatar)	2–2	(Saudi Arabia) Al-Taawoun	Al Rayyan, Qatar
19:00 UTC+3	Assal 55'; Dala 70'	Report	El Mahdioui 14' (pen.); Rivas (yellow card) 39'; Martínez 61'; Girotto (yellow card) 63'	Stadium: Khalifa International Stadium (Note: Al-Wakrah played their home matches at Khalifa International Stadium, Al Rayyan, instead of their regular home stadium Al Janoub Stadium, Al Wakrah.); Attendance: 1,087; Referee: Fu Ming (China)

19 February 2025 Second leg	Al-Taawoun (Saudi Arabia)	2–2 (a.e.t.) (4–4 agg.) (4–3 p)	(Qatar) Al-Wakrah	Buraidah, Saudi Arabia
21:00 UTC+3	Al-Ahmed (red card) 26'; Al-Nasser (yellow card) 57'; Al-Kuwaykibi 77'; Atiah (yellow card) 78'; Rivas 112', (yellow card) 112'; Al-Mufarrij (yellow card) 117'	Report	Termanini (yellow card) 10'; Mukhtar (yellow card) 33'; Fathy (yellow card) 45+3'; Dala 53', 120+4'; Assal (yellow card) 65'; Rashed (yellow card) 120+4'	Stadium: Al-Taawoun Club Stadium; Attendance: 3,345; Referee: Yusuke Araki (Japan)
	Penalties
	El Mahdioui (penalty scored); Bahebri (penalty scored); Al-Kuwaykibi (penalty scored); Girotto (penalty scored)		(penalty scored) Mendes; (penalty missed) Scholz; (penalty scored) Omar Salah; (penalty scored) Hassan; (penalty missed) Dala

===== Quarter-finals =====
4 March 2025 First leg	Tractor (Iran)	0–0	(Saudi Arabia) Al-Taawoun	Tabriz, Iran
19:30 UTC+3:30	Hashemnejad (yellow card) 54'; Khalilzadeh (yellow card) 57'	Report		Stadium: Sahand Stadium; Attendance: 25,080; Referee: Qasim Al Hatmi (Oman)

11 March 2025 Second leg	Al-Taawoun (Saudi Arabia)	2–2 (a.e.t.) (2–2 agg.) (4–2 p)	(Iran) Tractor	Buraidah, Saudi Arabia
23:00 UTC+3	Martínez (yellow card) 25'; Barrow 54'; Mandash 92'	Report	Khalilzadeh (yellow card) 2'; Hashemnejad (yellow card) 41'; Alves 50' (pen.); Štrkalj (yellow card) 57'; Drožđek 105'	Stadium: Al-Taawoun Club Stadium; Attendance: 5,689; Referee: Shen Yinhao (China)
	Penalties
	El Mahdioui (penalty scored); Barrow (penalty scored); Girotto (penalty scored); Adam (penalty scored)		(penalty scored) Postonjski; (penalty missed) Shiri; (penalty missed) Ashouri; (penalty scored) Drožđek

===== Semi-finals =====
8 April 2025 First leg	Al-Taawoun (Saudi Arabia)	1–0	(United Arab Emirates) Sharjah	Buraidah, Saudi Arabia
21:00 UTC+3	Sabiri 2'; Girotto (yellow card) 13'; Al-Jumayah (yellow card) 90+7'	Report		Stadium: Al-Taawoun Club Stadium; Attendance: 5,730; Referee: Fu Ming (China)

15 April 2025 Second leg	Sharjah (United Arab Emirates)	2–0 (2–1 agg.)	(Saudi Arabia) Al-Taawoun	Sharjah, United Arab Emirates
20:00 UTC+4	Meloni (yellow card) 26'; Cho Yu-min (yellow card) 28'; Hassan (yellow card) 70'; Camara 90+4'; Conraad (yellow card) 90+7'; Ben Larbi 90+9', (yellow card) 90+10'; Caio (yellow card) 90+12'	Report	Al-Nasser (yellow card) 50'; Atiah (yellow card) 89'; Mahzari (yellow card) 90+7'; Al-Mufarrij (yellow card) 90+14'; Al-Ahmed (yellow card) 90+14'	Stadium: Sharjah Stadium; Attendance: 9,452; Referee: Rustam Lutfullin (Uzbekistan)

== Statistics ==
=== Appearances ===
Last updated on 26 May 2025.

No.	Pos	Nat	Player	Total		Pro League		King's Cup		ACL Two		Super Cup	
No.	Pos	Nat	Player	Apps	Goals	Apps	Goals	Apps	Goals	Apps	Goals	Apps	Goals
Goalkeepers
1	GK	(Brazil) BRA	Mailson	28	0	16	0	3	0	8	0	1	0
13	GK	(Saudi Arabia) KSA	Abdulquddus Atiah	22	0	17+1	0	0	0	4	0	0	0
25	GK	(Saudi Arabia) KSA	Abdulrahman Al-Senaid	0	0	0	0	0	0	0	0	0	0
31	GK	(Saudi Arabia) KSA	Mohammed Al-Dhulayfi	0	0	0	0	0	0	0	0	0	0
98	GK	(Saudi Arabia) KSA	Abdulrahman Al-Ghamdi	1	0	1	0	0	0	0	0	0	0
Defenders
2	DF	(Saudi Arabia) KSA	Ali Sharahili	0	0	0	0	0	0	0	0	0	0
3	DF	(Brazil) BRA	Andrei Girotto	43	2	27+2	1	2	0	11	1	1	0
5	DF	(Saudi Arabia) KSA	Mohammed Mahzari	21	0	12+3	0	0	0	5+1	0	0	0
8	DF	(Saudi Arabia) KSA	Saad Al-Nasser	41	1	25+2	1	2+1	0	6+4	0	1	0
14	DF	(Saudi Arabia) KSA	Fahad Al-Jumayah	31	0	17+4	0	1+1	0	3+4	0	1	0
16	DF	(Venezuela) VEN	Renné Rivas	38	2	14+10	1	1+2	0	10+1	1	0	0
21	DF	(Saudi Arabia) KSA	Fahad Al-Abdulrazaq	15	0	7+5	0	1	0	1+1	0	0	0
23	DF	(Saudi Arabia) KSA	Waleed Al-Ahmed	34	3	23+2	2	2	1	5+1	0	1	0
26	DF	(Saudi Arabia) KSA	Ibrahim Al-Shoeil	7	0	2+2	0	0	0	0+2	0	0+1	0
32	DF	(Saudi Arabia) KSA	Muteb Al-Mufarrij	26	1	13+2	1	1	0	4+6	0	0	0
93	DF	(Saudi Arabia) KSA	Awn Al-Saluli	22	0	10+3	0	3	0	5+1	0	0	0
Midfielders
6	MF	(Saudi Arabia) KSA	Sultan Al-Farhan	23	0	6+11	0	0+1	0	0+5	0	0	0
7	MF	(Saudi Arabia) KSA	Mohammed Al-Kuwaykibi	24	2	9+6	0	0+1	1	3+4	1	1	0
18	MF	(Netherlands) NED	Aschraf El Mahdioui	46	1	30	0	3	0	12	1	1	0
19	MF	(Bolivia) BOL	Lucas Chávez	15	1	6+7	1	0+1	0	1	0	0	0
24	MF	(Brazil) BRA	Flávio Medeiros	20	2	11	0	2	1	6	1	1	0
27	MF	(Saudi Arabia) KSA	Sultan Mandash	43	7	15+14	3	2	0	8+3	4	0+1	0
28	MF	(Saudi Arabia) KSA	Turki Al-Shaifan	0	0	0	0	0	0	0	0	0	0
29	MF	(Saudi Arabia) KSA	Ahmed Bahusayn	25	1	9+8	0	1+1	0	1+4	1	1	0
44	MF	(Saudi Arabia) KSA	Abdulmalik Al-Marwani	3	0	1+2	0	0	0	0	0	0	0
70	MF	(Morocco) MAR	Abdelhamid Sabiri	17	3	8+4	2	0	0	4+1	1	0	0
76	MF	(Morocco) MAR	Fayçal Fajr	43	0	25+5	0	2+1	0	10	0	0	0
90	MF	(Saudi Arabia) KSA	Hattan Bahebri	27	2	4+14	2	1+2	0	0+6	0	0	0
Forwards
9	FW	(Saudi Arabia) KSA	Abdulfattah Adam	38	5	8+19	4	0+1	0	2+8	1	0	0
33	FW	(Saudi Arabia) KSA	Anas Al-Ghamdi	2	0	0+2	0	0	0	0	0	0	0
38	FW	(Colombia) COL	Roger Martínez	24	6	15+3	5	0	0	6	1	0	0
99	FW	(The Gambia) GAM	Musa Barrow	49	18	29+4	13	2+1	0	12	5	1	0
Players sent out on loan this season
67	MF	(Saudi Arabia) KSA	Mohammed Bakr	0	0	0	0	0	0	0	0	0	0
Player who made an appearance this season but left the club
10	MF	(Brazil) BRA	Mateus Castro	14	0	3+5	0	1+1	0	1+3	0	0	0
11	FW	(Brazil) BRA	João Pedro	23	6	11+2	3	3	1	4+2	2	1	0

=== Goalscorers ===
Rank	No.	Pos	Nat	Name	Pro League	King's Cup	ACL Two	Super Cup	Total
1	99	FW	(The Gambia)	Musa Barrow	13	0	5	0	18
2	27	MF	(Saudi Arabia)	Sultan Mandash	3	0	4	0	7
3	11	FW	(Brazil)	João Pedro	3	1	2	0	6
3	38	FW	(Colombia)	Roger Martínez	5	0	1	0	6
5	9	FW	(Saudi Arabia)	Abdulfattah Adam	4	0	1	0	5
6	23	DF	(Saudi Arabia)	Waleed Al-Ahmed	2	1	0	0	3
6	70	MF	(Morocco)	Abdelhamid Sabiri	2	0	1	0	3
8	3	DF	(Brazil)	Andrei Girotto	1	0	1	0	2
8	7	MF	(Saudi Arabia)	Mohammed Al-Kuwaykibi	0	1	1	0	2
8	16	DF	(Venezuela)	Renné Rivas	1	0	1	0	2
8	24	MF	(Brazil)	Flávio Medeiros	0	1	1	0	2
8	90	MF	(Saudi Arabia)	Hattan Bahebri	2	0	0	0	2
13	8	MF	(Saudi Arabia)	Saad Al-Nasser	1	0	0	0	1
13	18	MF	(Netherlands)	Aschraf El Mahdioui	0	0	1	0	1
13	19	MF	(Bolivia)	Lucas Chávez	1	0	0	0	1
13	29	MF	(Saudi Arabia)	Ahmed Bahusayn	0	0	1	0	1
13	32	DF	(Saudi Arabia)	Muteb Al-Mufarrij	1	0	0	0	1
Own goal					1	0	0	0	1
Total					40	4	20	0	64

Last Updated: 26 May 2025

=== Assists ===
Rank	No.	Pos	Nat	Name	Pro League	King's Cup	ACL Two	Super Cup	Total
1	76	MF	(Morocco)	Fayçal Fajr	6	1	2	0	9
2	99	FW	(The Gambia)	Musa Barrow	3	2	3	0	8
3	14	DF	(Saudi Arabia)	Fahad Al-Jumayah	3	0	1	0	4
4	8	MF	(Saudi Arabia)	Saad Al-Nasser	2	0	1	0	3
4	9	FW	(Saudi Arabia)	Abdulfattah Adam	1	0	2	0	3
4	18	MF	(Netherlands)	Aschraf El Mahdioui	0	0	3	0	3
4	24	MF	(Brazil)	Flávio Medeiros	1	0	2	0	3
8	5	DF	(Saudi Arabia)	Mohammed Mahzari	2	0	0	0	2
8	10	MF	(Brazil)	Mateus Castro	1	0	1	0	2
8	16	DF	(Venezuela)	Renné Rivas	1	0	1	0	2
8	27	MF	(Saudi Arabia)	Sultan Mandash	1	0	1	0	2
8	38	FW	(Colombia)	Roger Martínez	2	0	0	0	2
8	90	MF	(Saudi Arabia)	Hattan Bahebri	1	1	0	0	2
14	6	MF	(Saudi Arabia)	Sultan Al-Farhan	1	0	0	0	1
14	7	MF	(Saudi Arabia)	Mohammed Al-Kuwaykibi	1	0	0	0	1
14	19	MF	(Bolivia)	Lucas Chávez	1	0	0	0	1
14	70	MF	(Morocco)	Abdelhamid Sabiri	1	0	0	0	1
Total					28	4	17	0	49

Last Updated: 26 May 2025

=== Clean sheets ===
Rank	No.	Pos	Nat	Name	Pro League	King's Cup	ACL Two	Super Cup	Total
1	1	GK	(Brazil)	Mailson	7	1	2	0	10
2	13	GK	(Saudi Arabia)	Abdulquddus Atiah	4	0	2	0	6
Total					11	1	4	0	16

Last Updated: 8 April 2025
