= Girau =

Girau may refer to:

- Girau do Ponciano, Brazil
- Girau, Iran
