= Mailson (footballer, born 1996) =

Brazilian footballer

Personal information
- Full name: Mailson Tenório dos antos
- Date of birth: 20 August 1996 (age 30)
- Place of birth: Girau do Ponciano, Brazil
- Height: 1.97 m (6 ft 6 in)
- Position: Goalkeeper

Team information
- Current team: Al-Taawoun
- Number: 1

Youth career
- São Domingos-AL
- 2014–2018: Sport Recife

Senior career*
Years	Team	Apps	(Gls)
2017–2022	Sport Recife	155	(0)
2022–	Al-Taawoun	108	(0)
- * Club domestic league appearances and goals as of 3 May 2026 (UTC)

Mailson Tenório dos Santos (born 20 August 1996), mononymously Mailson, is a Brazilian footballer who plays as a goalkeeper for Saudi Arabian club Al-Taawoun.

== Club career ==
Mailson was born in Girau do Ponciano, Alagoas, and joined Sport Recife's youth setup in 2014, from São Domingos-AL. He made his first team debut on 4 April 2017, starting in a 2–2 Campeonato Pernambucano home draw against Salgueiro.

Promoted to the main squad for the 2018 season, Mailson made his Série A debut on 24 April, in a 1–1 home draw against Botafogo, as starter Magrão was injured and immediate backup Agenor asked to leave the club. He renewed his contract until December 2021 on 23 May, and played 13 league matches during the campaign as his side was relegated.

Mailson began the 2019 season as a starter ahead of Magrão, who subsequently left the club, and renewed his contract until 2022 on 16 September. In October, an injury sidelined him for the rest of the year.

Upon returning, Mailson lost his starting spot to Luan Polli, with both subsequently sharing the first-choice status throughout the season.

On 22 July 2022, Mailson signed a three-year contract with Saudi Arabian club Al-Taawoun.

== Personal life ==
Mailson's younger brother, Denival Tenório dos Santos, is also a footballer and a goalkeeper. He too was athletic.

== Career statistics ==
As of match played 3 May 2026

Appearances and goals by club, season and competition
Club	Season	League			State League		Cup		Continental		Other		Total	
Club	Season	Division	Apps	Goals	Apps	Goals	Apps	Goals	Apps	Goals	Apps	Goals	Apps	Goals
Sport Recife	2017	Série A	0	0	1	0	0	0	—		—		1	0
Sport Recife	2018	Série A	13	0	0	0	0	0	—		—		13	0
Sport Recife	2019	Série B	29	0	7	0	0	0	—		—		36	0
Sport Recife	2020	Série A	7	0	8	0	0	0	—		2 (Note: Appearance(s) in Copa do Nordeste)	0	17	0
Sport Recife	2021	Série A	37	0	9	0	0	0	—		2	0	48	0
Sport Recife	2022	Série B	19	0	9	0	0	0	—		12	0	40	0
Sport Recife	Total		105	0	34	0	0	0	0	0	16	0	155	0
Al Taawoun	2022–23	Saudi Pro League	28	0	—		1	0	—		—		29	0
Al Taawoun	2023–24	Saudi Pro League	34	0	—		3	0	—		—		37	0
Al Taawoun	2024–25	Saudi Pro League	16	0	—		3	0	8	0	1	0	28	0
Al Taawoun	2025–26	Saudi Pro League	30	0	—		2	0	—		—		32	0
Al Taawoun	Total		108	0	—		9	0	—		—		126	0
Career total			213	0	34	0	9	0	0	0	17	0	281	0
