= Roger Martínez =

Colombian footballer (born 1994)

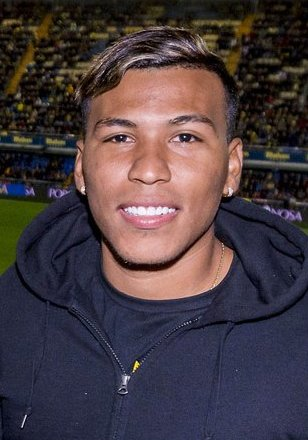
- Martínez in 2018

Personal information
- Full name: Roger Beyker Martínez Tobinson
- Date of birth: 23 June 1994 (age 32)
- Place of birth: Cartagena de Indias, Colombia
- Height: 1.80 m (5 ft 11 in)
- Positions: Forward; winger

Team information
- Current team: Al Shabab
- Number: 9

Youth career
- Estudiantil Porteño
- 2011: Boca Juniors
- 2011: Argentinos Juniors
- 2012: Racing Club

Senior career*
Years	Team	Apps	(Gls)
2013–2016	Racing Club	24	(5)
2014	→ Santamarina (loan)	9	(0)
2015	→ Aldosivi (loan)	26	(6)
2016–2018	Jiangsu Suning	30	(17)
2018	→ Villarreal (loan)	8	(1)
2018–2023	América	144	(28)
2023–2025	Racing Club	34	(10)
2025–2026	Al-Taawoun	51	(28)
2026–	Al Shabab	10	(3)

International career^{‡}
2015–2016	Colombia Olympic	4	(5)
2016–2024	Colombia	28	(4)
Medal record
Representing Colombia
Copa América Centenario
Bronze medal – third place	2016 United States	Team
- * Club domestic league appearances and goals as of 21:08, 30 October 2026 (UTC) ‡ National team caps and goals as of 23:15, 10 October 2024 (UTC)

Roger Beyker Martínez Tobinson (Latin American Spanish: [ˈroʝeɾ maɾˈtines]; born 23 June 1994) is a Colombian professional footballer who plays as a winger or forward for Pro League side Al-Shabab and the Colombia national team.

== Club career ==
=== Early career ===
He began playing on 11 November, Juventus and Expreso Rojo, a team with which he became champion. He was also called to the selection of his Cartagena province. Later he had a brief stint at Academia de Crespo and from there he went to a training school in Medellín called Student. At the age of 17, he was offered to go to Argentina, arriving at Boca Juniors where he was tested for a few months; although they were impressed by him, he could not play official matches because he was not with his parents. He returned to Colombia to later return to Argentina, this time to Argentinos Juniors where he spent 6 months and suffered the same fate as in Boca. Then his representative would get him a chance at Racing.

=== Racing Club ===
He made his debut for Racing Club de Argentina in a match for the 2013 Copa Sudamericana, in which his team fell to Lanús 2–1, entering the second half replacing Ricardo Centurión. His first match in the First Division of Argentine soccer was in the defeat of his team by 3 to 1 against Tigre for the 2013 Initial Tournament.

==== Loan to Santamarina ====
In 2014, the Racing coach, Diego Cocca, confirmed that he would not take him into account and they transferred him to Santamarina from the second division of Argentine football without a purchase option. His first game was against Atlético Tucumán where he assisted his teammate Martín Michel at the last minute to make it 1–0. In only 2 games was he a starter, the other 7 always coming off the bench. His loan ended and he returned to Racing.

==== Loan to Aldosivi ====
In 2015 the Racing coach, Diego Cocca, confirmed (for the 2nd time) that he would not take him into account and they transferred him to Aldosivi, recently promoted to the First Division of Argentina. His first match was on the 1st date, against Vélez Sarsfield, in a 2–0 defeat. His first goal was scored against Sarmiento de Junin, in a 2–2 draw. His second goal was against Quilmes after an excellent combination between Jose Sand and Pablo Luguercio (2 ex Racing) where he defined a dive against Fabian Assman. His third goal was against Unión, in a 3–3 draw. His fourth goal was against Godoy Cruz de Mendoza, in a 2–0 victory. His fifth goal in Aldosivi was against Boca Juniors at La Bombonera, in a historic victory 3 to 0, where he takes away his unbeaten record in the championship. His sixth and last goal for the Mar del Plata club was a header against Estudiantes de La Plata, in a 2–1 defeat, where he also scored a goal from his own net.

==== Return ====
After having played 27 games, converting 6 goals and having good performances in Aldosivi "El Tiburón", Facundo Sava informed him that he would take him into account for the next season and he returns for the third time to Racing Club de Avellaneda. On 24 February 2016 he scored his first international goal with Racing against Bolívar in the 4–1 victory for the first date of the 2016 Copa Libertadores.

=== Jiangsu Suning ===
On 12 July 2016 he moved to Jiangsu Suning from China in exchange for 9,800,000 euros, with the possibility, in the future, of reaching Inter Milan. his team 4–0 over Hebei CFFC. He would score a double again on 30 July in a 3–2 loss at the hands of Shanghai Shenhua. He would double again on 21 August, giving his team a 2–1 victory over the Beijing Guoan. On 22 October he scored a brace where he would tie at two goals against Chongqing Lifan. On 27 November he scored a brace in the final of the China Cup in a two-goal draw against Guangzhou Evergrande, where they would lose by a visitor goal as runners-up in the tournament. On 24 May he scored his first goal of 2017 for the AFC Champions League in a 2–1 loss at his visit to Shanghai SIPG. His first brace of the year came on 9 August in a 4–2 away loss against Guangzhou R&F.

==== Loan to Villarreal ====
On 7 January 2018 his arrival on loan for six months with a purchase option was confirmed at Villarreal Club de Fútbol of the Spanish League where he would be a teammate of his compatriot Carlos Bacca. He debuted on 10 January, playing the last 18 minutes in the 2–1 victory over CD Leganés although they were eliminated on aggregate by the round of 16 of the Copa del Rey. Converting his first goal in Spain, on the last date of the League, scoring the partial discount of the final 2–2, against Real Madrid.

=== Club América ===
In June 2018, he was confirmed as a new player for Club América in the First Division of Mexico for 8,500,000 euros. He debuted on 22 July, scoring the goal for his team in a 2–1 loss at Club Necaxa. His first goal of 2019 was on 2 February from a penalty kick in a 2–0 victory over Querétaro FC. He scored a brace on 5 February in a 3–1 win over Club Necaxa, coming out as the star of the match for the Mexico Cup, he came back and scored a brace for the Cup on 26 February in a 5–2 win over CF Pachuca. On 9 May, for the first leg quarterfinals, he scored a double in a 3–1 victory over Cruz Azul. His first goal of the season marks 21 July in a 4–2 victory over CF Monterrey. On 29 October he scored the winning goal by the minimum as visitors against Atlético San Luis. On 1 July 2023, Martínez became a free agent.

=== Late career ===
In July 2023, Martínez returned to Racing Club in Argentina, where he spent 18 months before transferring to Saudi Arabian side Al-Taawoun in January 2025.

== International career ==
=== Youth ===
He was called up to the Colombia under-23 team. Roger played in the international playoff against the United States, in order to return to an Olympic event. The first leg was on 25 March 2016 in Barranquilla, ended 1–1 and had no minutes. On 29 March, in the second leg, Colombia defeated the United States 1–2 in Houston, Roger scored both goals and was the figure, giving Colombia the classification to the 2016 Olympic Games. However, coach Carlos 'Piscis' Restrepo did not take him into account for the 2016 Rio Olympics tournament.

=== Senior ===
Martínez was included in coach José Pekerman's squad for the Copa América Centenario. He made his debut with Colombia on 29 May 2016 in a friendly match against Haiti, scoring Colombia's third goal in their 3–1 win.

On 30 May 2019, he would be selected in the final list of 23 players who played the 2019 Copa América in Brazil. On 9 June he would attend for the final 3–0 win over Peru in a friendly match played in Lima. On 15 June he scored the first in the 2–0 victory over Argentina for the first date of the Copa América 2019. On 2 September 2021 he scored in Colombia's 1–1 draw with Bolivia for the Qualifiers against Qatar 2022.

== Career statistics ==
=== Club ===
As of 29 August 2025

Appearances and goals by club, season and competition
Club	Season	League			Cup		Continental		Other		Total	
Club	Season	Division	Apps	Goals	Apps	Goals	Apps	Goals	Apps	Goals	Apps	Goals
Racing Club	2013–14	Argentine Primera División	14	1	0	0	2	0	—		16	1
Racing Club	2016	Argentine Primera División	10	4	0	0	5	3	3	1	18	8
Racing Club	Total		24	5	0	0	7	3	3	1	34	9
Santamarina	2014	Primera B Nacional	9	0	—		—		—		9	0
Aldosivi	2015	Argentine Primera División	26	6	1	0	—		—		27	6
Jiangsu Suning	2016	Chinese Super League	12	10	5	2	—		—		17	12
Jiangsu Suning	2017	Chinese Super League	18	7	2	0	5	1	1	0	26	8
Jiangsu Suning	Total		30	17	7	2	5	1	1	0	43	20
Villarreal	2017–18	La Liga	8	1	1	0	0	0	—		9	1
América	2018–19	Liga MX	34	10	6	4	—		4	1	44	15
América	2019–20	Liga MX	25	2	—		2	0	—		27	2
América	2020–21	Liga MX	29	7	—		5	1	—		34	8
América	2021–22	Liga MX	35	5	—		—		1	1	36	6
América	2022–23	Liga MX	21	4	—		—		—		21	4
América	Total		144	28	6	4	7	1	5	1	162	34
Racing Club	2023	Argentine Primera División	11	3	1	0	3	1	—		15	4
Racing Club	2024	Argentine Primera División	23	7	1	0	11	5	—		35	12
Racing Club	Total		34	10	2	0	14	6	—		50	16
Al-Taawoun	2024–25	Saudi Pro League	18	5	0	0	6	1	—		24	6
Al-Taawoun	2025–26	Saudi Pro League	1	0	0	0	0	0	—		1	0
Al-Taawoun	Total		19	5	0	0	6	1	—		25	6
Career total			294	72	17	6	39	12	9	3	359	93

=== International ===
As of match played 10 October 2024

Appearances and goals by national team and year
National team	Year	Apps	Goals
Colombia	2016	5	1
Colombia	2019	11	1
Colombia	2021	7	1
Colombia	2023	2	1
Colombia	2024	1	0
Total		28	4

=== International goals ===
As of 15 June 2019

No.	Date	Venue	Opponent	Score	Final	Competition
1.	29 May 2016	Marlins Park, Miami, United States	Haiti	3–1	3–1	Friendly
2.	15 June 2019	Itaipava Arena Fonte Nova, Salvador, Brazil	Argentina	1–0	2–0	2019 Copa América
3.	2 September 2021	Estadio Hernando Siles, La Paz, Bolivia	Bolivia	1–0	1–1	2022 FIFA World Cup qualification
4.	16 December 2023	Los Angeles Memorial Coliseum, Los Angeles, United States	Mexico	2–2	3–2	Friendly

== Honours ==
América

- Liga MX: Apertura 2018
- Copa MX: Clausura 2019
- Campeón de Campeones: 2019

Racing Club

- Copa Sudamericana: 2024

Individual

- Chinese FA Cup Most Valuable Player: 2016
