= João Pedro (footballer, born 22 April 1993) =

Brazilian footballer

Personal information
- Full name: João Pedro Pereira dos Santos
- Date of birth: 22 April 1993 (age 33)
- Place of birth: Fortaleza, Brazil
- Height: 1.83 m (6 ft 0 in)
- Position: Striker

Team information
- Current team: Qatar
- Number: 9

Youth career
- –2011: Ferroviário
- 2011–2013: Nacional U19

Senior career*
Years	Team	Apps	(Gls)
2011	Ferroviário	3	(0)
2013	Palmeiras B	7	(0)
2013–2014	Santa Clara	34	(4)
2014–2015	Trofense	33	(5)
2015–2016	Fortaleza	4	(0)
2016	Rayo Majadahonda	10	(3)
2016–2017	Alcobendas	35	(14)
2017–2019	Al-Fateh	41	(13)
2019–2021	Al-Dhafra	17	(12)
2020–2021	→ Baniyas (loan)	24	(18)
2021–2023	Al-Wahda	53	(30)
2023–2025	Al-Taawoun	38	(14)
2025	Al Wasl	13	(9)
2025-	Qatar SC	9	(7)
- * Club domestic league appearances and goals

João Pedro Pereira dos Santos (born 22 April 1993), commonly known as João Pedro, is a Brazilian footballer who plays for Qatar Stars League club Qatar.

== Career ==
He formerly played for Ferroviário, C.D. Nacional U19, Palmeiras B, Santa Clara, Trofense, Fortaleza, Rayo Majadahonda, Alcobendas, Al-Fateh, Al-Dhafra, Baniyas and Al-Wahda.

On 6 September 2023, Pedro joined Saudi Pro League club Al-Taawoun.

On 29 January 2025, Pedro returned to the UAE and joined Al Wasl.

== Club career statistics ==
As of match played 16 January 2025

Club	Season	League			National cup (Note: Includes King's Cup, UAE President's Cup)		League cup (Note: Includes Crown Prince Cup, UAE League Cup)		Continental		Other		Total	
Club	Season	Division	Apps	Goals	Apps	Goals	Apps	Goals	Apps	Goals	Apps	Goals	Apps	Goals
Al Fateh	2017–18	Saudi Pro League	22	9	1	0	1	0	–		–		24	9
Al Fateh	2018–19	Saudi Pro League	19	4	0	0	0	0	–		–		19	4
Al Fateh	Total		41	13	1	0	1	0	–		–		43	13
Al Dhafra	2019–20	UAE Pro League	17	12	3	0	6	3	–		–		26	15
Baniyas	2020–21	UAE Pro League	23	18	2	0	4	2	–		–		29	20
Al Wahda	2021–22	UAE Pro League	26	14	5	3	5	3	2 (Note: Appearances in AFC Champions League)	0	–		38	20
Al Wahda	2022–23	UAE Pro League	25	15	1	0	3	2	–		1 (Note: Appearance in UAE Super Cup)	1	28	17
Al Wahda	2023–24	UAE Pro League	2	1	1	0	0	0	–		4 (Note: Appearances in Arab Club Champions Cup)	1	6	2
Al Wahda	Total		53	30	7	3	8	5	2	0	5	2	75	39
Al Taawoun	2023–24	Saudi Pro League	25	11	3	0	–		–		–		28	11
Al Taawoun	2024–25	Saudi Pro League	13	3	3	1	–		6 (Note: Appearances in AFC Champions League Two)	2	1 (Note: Appearance in Saudi Super Cup)	0	23	6
Al Taawoun	Total		38	14	6	1	0	0	6	2	1	0	51	17
Career total			172	87	19	4	19	10	8	2	6	2	224	105
