= Mohamed Khaled Hassan =

Qatari footballer (born 2003)

Mohamed Khaled
Personal information
- Full name: Mohamed Khaled Hassan
- Date of birth: 8 January 2003 (age 23)
- Place of birth: Egypt
- Position: Forward

Team information
- Current team: Umm Salal (on loan from Al-Wakrah)
- Number: 40

Youth career
- 2018–: Al-Wakrah

Senior career*
Years	Team	Apps	(Gls)
2020–	Al-Wakrah	42	(3)
2026–	→ Umm Salal (loan)	0	(0)

International career^{‡}
2023	Qatar U20	3	(0)
- * Club domestic league appearances and goals as of 16:19, 27 July 2020 (UTC) ‡ National team caps and goals as of 16:19, 27 July 2020 (UTC)

Mohamed Khaled Hassan (born 8 January 2003) is a professional footballer who plays as a forward for Qatar Stars League side Umm Salal, on loan from Al-Wakrah. Born in Egypt, he has represented Qatar at youth level.

== Career statistics ==
=== Club ===
As of 27 July 2020.

Club	Season	League			Cup		Continental		Other		Total	
Club	Season	Division	Apps	Goals	Apps	Goals	Apps	Goals	Apps	Goals	Apps	Goals
Al-Wakrah	2019–20	Qatar Stars League	1	0	0	0	0	0	0	0	1	0
Career total			1	0	0	0	0	0	0	0	1	0
