= Victor Hugo (footballer, born 10 May 2004) =

Brazilian footballer (born 2004)

Personal information
- Full name: Victor Hugo Ramos de Souza
- Date of birth: 10 May 2004 (age 22)
- Place of birth: Bela Vista do Paraíso, Brazil
- Height: 1.82 m (6 ft 0 in)
- Position: Midfielder

Team information
- Current team: Ajman

Youth career
- 2020–2023: Londrina

Senior career*
Years	Team	Apps	(Gls)
2022–2024	Londrina	29	(2)
2024–2025	FC Cascavel	10	(0)
2024–2025	→ Fluminense (loan)	6	(0)
2025	→ Amazonas (loan)	6	(0)
2025–2026	Al-Taawoun	16	(0)
2026–	Ajman	0	(0)
- * Club domestic league appearances and goals as of 18:26, 5 December 2024 (UTC)

Victor Hugo Ramos de Souza (born 10 May 2004), known as Victor Hugo or sometimes as Vitão, is a Brazilian professional footballer who plays as a midfielder for UAE Pro League side Ajman.

== Career ==
Victor Hugo was born in Bela Vista do Paraíso, Paraná, and joined Londrina's youth sides in 2020. He made his first team debut on 5 November 2022, coming on as a second-half substitute in a 2–1 Série B away loss to Sampaio Corrêa.

Victor Hugo scored his first senior goal on 2 February 2023, netting the opener in a 1–1 Campeonato Paranaense home draw against Rio Branco-PR. Despite starting to feature more regularly, he left the club in March 2024, after their partnership with SM Sports (the company which owned his economic rights) ended; he was then assigned to FC Cascavel, which established a partnership with the company.

On 30 August 2024, Victor Hugo was loaned to Série A side Fluminense until June 2025, with a buyout clause. He made his debut in the category on 29 September, replacing Facundo Bernal late into a 1–0 away loss to Atlético Goianiense.

On 10 September 2025, Hugo joined Saudi Pro League side Al-Taawoun on a one-year deal.

== Career statistics ==
As of 5 December 2024

Club	Season	League			State League		Cup		Continental		Other		Total	
Club	Season	Division	Apps	Goals	Apps	Goals	Apps	Goals	Apps	Goals	Apps	Goals	Apps	Goals
Londrina	2022	Série B	1	0	—		—		—		—		1	0
Londrina	2023	Série B	10	0	8	1	—		—		—		18	1
Londrina	2024	Série C	0	0	10	1	—		—		—		10	1
Londrina	Total		11	0	18	2	—		—		—		29	2
FC Cascavel	2024	Série D	10	0	—		—		—		—		10	0
Fluminense	2024	Série A	5	0	—		—		—		—		5	0
Career total			26	0	18	2	0	0	0	0	0	0	44	2
