= Abdelhamid Sabiri =

Moroccan footballer (born 1996)

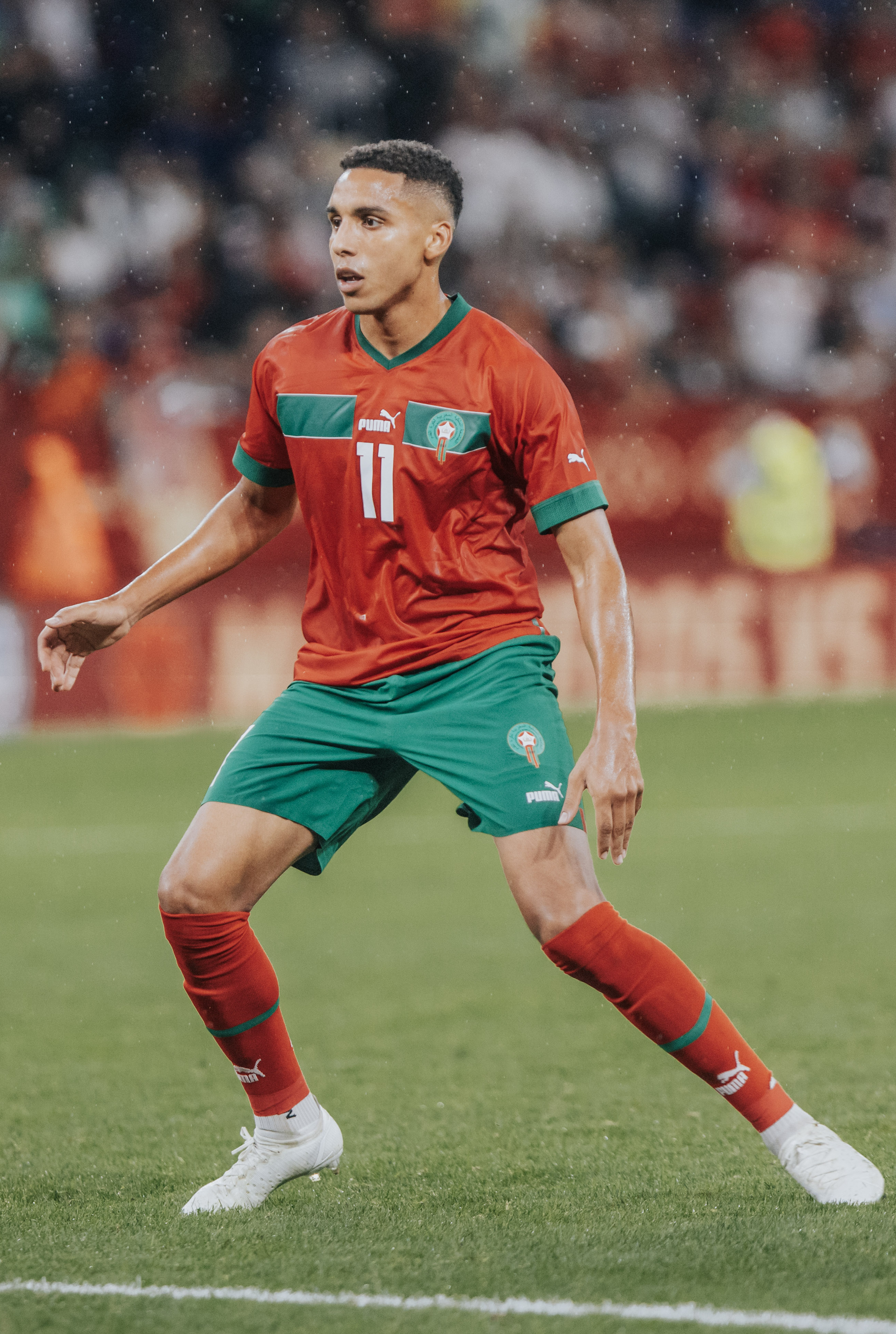
- Sabiri playing for Morocco in 2022

Personal information
- Full name: Abdelhamid Sabiri
- Date of birth: 28 November 1996 (age 29)
- Place of birth: Goulmima, Errachidia Province, Morocco
- Height: 1.83 m (6 ft 0 in)
- Position: Attacking midfielder

Team information
- Current team: Eyüpspor
- Number: 10

Youth career
- 2001–2014: TuS Koblenz
- 2014–2015: Darmstadt 98

Senior career*
Years	Team	Apps	(Gls)
2015–2016	Sportfreunde Siegen	30	(18)
2016–2017	1. FC Nürnberg II	21	(12)
2016–2017	1. FC Nürnberg	9	(5)
2017–2019	Huddersfield Town	7	(0)
2019–2020	SC Paderborn	24	(4)
2020–2022	Ascoli	43	(11)
2022	→ Sampdoria (loan)	14	(3)
2022–2023	Sampdoria	13	(1)
2023–2026	Fiorentina	1	(0)
2023	→ Sampdoria (loan)	5	(1)
2023–2024	→ Al-Fayha (loan)	19	(5)
2024–2025	→ Ajman (loan)	6	(1)
2025	→ Al Taawoun (loan)	12	(2)
2026–	Eyüpspor	3	(0)

International career
2018–2019	Germany U21	5	(1)
2022–2023	Morocco	11	(2)
- * Club domestic league appearances and goals as of 17 October 2026

Abdelhamid Sabiri (Note: Arabic: عبد الحميد صابيري; Berber languages: ⵄⴱⴷⵍⵃⴰⵎⵉⴷ ⵚⴰⴱⵉⵔⵉ) (born 28 November 1996) is a Moroccan professional footballer who plays as an attacking midfielder for Süper Lig club Eyüpspor.

Sabiri has previously played for Sportfreunde Siegen, 1. FC Nürnberg, Huddersfield Town and SC Paderborn. Born in Morocco, he represented Germany at under-21 level, before switching allegiance to Morocco in 2022.

== Early life ==
Sabiri was born in Goulmima, Errachidia Province, Morocco into an Amazigh family. He moved to Germany at the age of three and was raised in Frankfurt. He holds dual citizenship of Germany and Morocco.

== Club career ==
After spending his youth career with TuS Koblenz and Darmstadt 98, Sabiri began his club career with Sportfreunde Siegen in the German fifth tier. After achieving 20 goals and six assists in 33 appearances in all competitions, he moved to 1. FC Nürnberg in 2016, initially playing for the club's second team. He was promoted to the first team in January 2017 and went on to score five times in nine 2. Bundesliga appearances towards the end of the season.

=== Huddersfield Town ===
Sabiri joined English club Huddersfield Town on 23 August 2017 on a three-year deal, for an undisclosed fee. The club had recently been promoted to the Premier League, the highest tier of English league football. He made his Premier League debut in a 2–0 loss away to West Ham on 11 September 2017. He made sporadic appearances for the Terriers, after suffering injuries, before his contract was terminated by mutual agreement on 27 August 2019.

=== SC Paderborn ===
On 27 August 2019, Sabiri joined SC Paderborn on a two-year deal, with the option of a third year.

=== Ascoli ===
On 28 September 2020, Sabiri joined Italian Serie B club Ascoli on a two-year contract.

=== Sampdoria ===
On 29 January 2022, Sabiri moved to Serie A club Sampdoria on loan with an option to buy and a conditional obligation to buy. Sabiri made his debut in a 2–0 loss against Atalanta B.C. He scored his first goal for the club against Spezia, in his seventh appearance for the team. On 30 January 2023, Italian sources confirmed talks between Sampdoria and Fiorentina to sign Sabiri for €4 million.

=== Fiorentina ===
On 31 January 2023, Sabiri signed with Fiorentina and was loaned back to Sampdoria for the rest of the 2022–23 season.

==== Al-Fayha (loan) ====
On 7 September 2023, Sabiri joined Al-Fayha on a one-year loan. On 15 September 2023, Sabiri made his debut in a 1–0 loss against Al Shabab. A week later, Sabiri scored his first goal for the club in a 3–1 victory against Al-Riyadh SC. On 3 October 2023, Sabiri scored a brace in his first appearance in the AFC Champions League, helping his team claim a 2–0 victory against Pakhtakor.

==== Ajman Club (loan) ====
On 30 September 2024, Sabiri joined Ajman Club on loan from Fiorentina.

==== Al Taawoun (loan) ====
On 30 January 2025, Sabiri moved on a new loan to Al Taawoun in Saudi Arabia.

== International career ==
Sabiri was called up to Germany's under-21 side in October 2018. He scored once in a total of five appearances for the team, against the Netherlands.

In April 2022, Sabiri said he wanted to play in the World Cup with the Moroccan national team. In September 2022, Sabiri was called up to join the Moroccan national team. He played his first match in a friendlies against Chile, in which he managed to score a goal in a 2–0 victory that took place in the RCDE Stadium in Barcelona.

On 10 November 2022, Sabiri was named in Morocco's 26-man squad for the 2022 FIFA World Cup in Qatar.

== Playing style ==
Sabiri mainly plays in the "number 10" position behind a central striker, but can also play in wide attacking areas.

== Personal life ==
Sabiri can speak his native Standard Moroccan Amazigh, German and Italian but is not fluent in Moroccan Darija Arabic.

== Career statistics ==
=== Club ===
As of match played 26 October 2025

Appearances and goals by club, season and competition
Club	Season	League			National cup (Note: Includes DFB-Pokal, FA Cup, Coppa Italia, King's Cup (Saudi Arabia))		League cup (Note: Includes EFL Cup)		Continental		Other		Total	
Club	Season	Division	Apps	Goals	Apps	Goals	Apps	Goals	Apps	Goals	Apps	Goals	Apps	Goals
Sportfreunde Siegen	2015–16	Oberliga Westfalen	30	18	2	2	—		—		1 (Note: Appearance in Westphalian DFB-Pokal play-off)	0	33	20
1. FC Nürnberg II	2016–17	Regionalliga Bayern	21	12	—		—		—		—		21	12
1. FC Nürnberg	2016–17	2. Bundesliga	9	5	0	0	—		—		—		9	5
Huddersfield Town	2017–18	Premier League	5	0	4	0	1	0	—		—		10	0
Huddersfield Town	2018–19	Premier League	2	0	0	0	1	0	—		—		3	0
Huddersfield Town	Total		7	0	4	0	2	0	0	0	0	0	13	0
SC Paderborn	2019–20	Bundesliga	24	4	1	0	—		—		—		25	4
Ascoli	2020–21	Serie B	32	8	0	0	—		—		—		32	8
Ascoli	2021–22	Serie B	11	3	0	0	—		—		—		11	3
Ascoli	Total		43	11	0	0	0	0	0	0	0	0	43	11
Sampdoria (loan)	2021–22	Serie A	14	3	0	0	—		—		—		14	3
Sampdoria	2022–23	Serie A	18	2	3	1	—		—		—		21	3
Fiorentina	2023–24	Serie A	0	0	—		—		0	0	—		0	0
Fiorentina	2025–26	Serie A	1	0	0	0	—		1 (Note: Appearance in UEFA Conference League)	0	—		2	0
Fiorentina	Total		1	0	0	0	—		1	0	—		2	0
Al-Fayha (loan)	2023–24	Saudi Pro League	19	5	1	0	—		3 (Note: Appearances in AFC Champions League)	2	—		23	7
Al-Taawoun (loan)	2024–25	Saudi Pro League	12	2	0	0	—		5 (Note: Appearances in AFC Champions League Two)	1	—		17	3
Career total			197	62	11	3	2	0	9	3	1	0	220	68

=== International ===
As of match played 17 June 2023

Appearances and goals by national team and year
National team	Year	Apps	Goals
Morocco	2022	7	1
Morocco	2023	4	1
Total		11	2

Scores and results list Morocco's goal tally first, score column indicates score after each Sabiri goal.

List of international goals scored by Abdelhamid Sabiri
No.	Date	Venue	Cap	Opponent	Score	Result	Competition
1	23 September 2022	RCDE Stadium, Barcelona, Spain	1	Chile	2–0	2–0	Friendly
2	25 March 2023	Ibn Batouta Stadium, Tangier, Morocco	8	Brazil	2–1	2–1	Friendly

== Honours ==
Sportfreunde Siegen

- Oberliga Westfalen: 2016

Orders

- Order of the Throne: 2022
