= Lucas Chávez (Bolivian footballer) =

Bolivian footballer (born 2003)

Personal information
- Full name: Lucas Leonidas Chávez Cruz
- Date of birth: 17 April 2003 (age 23)
- Place of birth: Santa Cruz, Bolivia
- Height: 1.70 m (5 ft 7 in)
- Position: Midfielder

Team information
- Current team: Volta Redonda (on loan from Bolívar)
- Number: 20

Senior career*
Years	Team	Apps	(Gls)
2021–	Bolívar	51	(6)
2024–2025	→ Al-Taawoun (loan)	13	(1)
2025–	→ Volta Redonda (loan)	4	(0)

International career^{‡}
2023–	Bolivia	14	(0)
- * Club domestic league appearances and goals as of 20 September 2025 (UTC) ‡ National team caps and goals as of 22:03, 10 October 2025 (UTC)

Lucas Leonidas Chávez Cruz (born 17 April 2003) is a Bolivian professional footballer who plays as a midfielder for Brazilian club Volta Redonda, on loan from Club Bolívar, and for the Bolivia national team. He made his international debut for Bolivia in 2023 and played at the 2024 Copa América.

== Club career ==
Born in Santa Cruz de la Sierra, Chávez began his career at Club Bolívar. He made his debut on 2 May 2021 in a 2–0 home win over C.D. Real Tomayapo in the Bolivian Primera División, coming on as a 67th-minute substitute under manager Natxo González. He totalled six appearances that season, all from the bench.

In 2022, Chávez played 13 games as Bolívar won the Apertura, though the season was abandoned in the Clausura stage. He made his Copa Libertadores debut in a 2–0 loss away to C.D. Universidad Católica del Ecuador on 2 March, and scored his first goal on 19 April, concluding a 4–1 win at F.C. Universitario de Vinto; both were as a substitute.

On 7 June 2023, Chávez scored his first goal in the Libertadores, concluding a 2–0 win over Cerro Porteño of Paraguay at the Estadio Hernando Siles to make it to the last 16. In the league, he scored four goals in 22 games as his team came runners-up to La Paz rivals The Strongest; on 23 July he scored in a 3–0 home win in his first edition of the local derby. On 5 August, he extended his contract until 2026. Days later, he was ruled out with a fracture to his left clavicle. In December, Bolívar also won the 2023 Copa de la División Profesional; Chávez received one of six red cards in an added-time brawl against C.D. Jorge Wilstermann, despite never leaving the substitutes' bench during the final.

On 3 September 2024, Chávez joined Saudi Pro League side Al-Taawoun on a one-year loan. He played 15 games over all competitions and scored in a 3–0 home win over Damac, making him the first Bolivian to score in the league; he also assisted the opening goal by Sultan Mandash after two minutes.

Chávez was loaned to Volta Redonda of the Campeonato Brasileiro Série B on 9 August 2025. Having already had an offer rejected for being low, the club retained the option to purchase him outright in December.

== International career ==
In June 2023, Chávez was called up to the Bolivia national team for friendlies against Ecuador and Chile. He made his debut against the latter in his hometown, starting in the goalless draw; manager Gustavo Costas praised his performance.

Chávez was called up by former Bolívar manager Antonio Carlos Zago in the squad for the 2024 Copa América in the United States. In a group-stage elimination, he played as a second-half substitute in the latter two games.

On 10 June 2025, Chávez was sent off after 19 minutes of a 2–0 home win over Chile in 2026 FIFA World Cup qualification, for a high challenge that struck the chest of Fabián Hormazábal. Referee Esteban Ostojich initially gave a yellow card, before video assistant referee review.

== Career statistics ==
=== Club ===
As of match played 5 September 2025

Appearances and goals by club, season and competition
Club	Season	League			Cup		Continental		Other		Total	
Club	Season	Division	Apps	Goals	Apps	Goals	Apps	Goals	Apps	Goals	Apps	Goals
Bolívar	2021	Bolivian Primera División	6	0	0	0	—		—		6	0
Bolívar	2022	Bolivian Primera División	13	1	0	0	1 (Note: Appearances in Copa Libertadores)	0	—		14	1
Bolívar	2023	Bolivian Primera División	22	4	6	0	4	1	—		32	5
Bolívar	2024	Bolivian Primera División	10	1	0	0	3	0	—		13	1
Bolívar	Total		51	6	6	0	8	1	—		65	7
Al-Taawoun (loan)	2024–25	Saudi Pro League	13	1	1	0	1 (Note: Appearance in AFC Champions League Elite)	0	—		15	1
Volta Redonda (loan)	2025	Série B	3	0	0	0	—		—		3	0
Career total			67	7	7	0	9	1	0	0	83	8

=== International ===
As of matches played 10 October 2025

Appearances and goals by national team and year
National team	Year	Apps	Goals
Bolivia	2023	1	0
Bolivia	2024	8	0
Bolivia	2025	5	0
Total		14	0

== Honours ==
Bolívar

- Bolivian Primera División: 2022 (Apertura)
- 2023 Copa de la División Profesional
