= Musa Barrow =

Gambian footballer (born 1998)

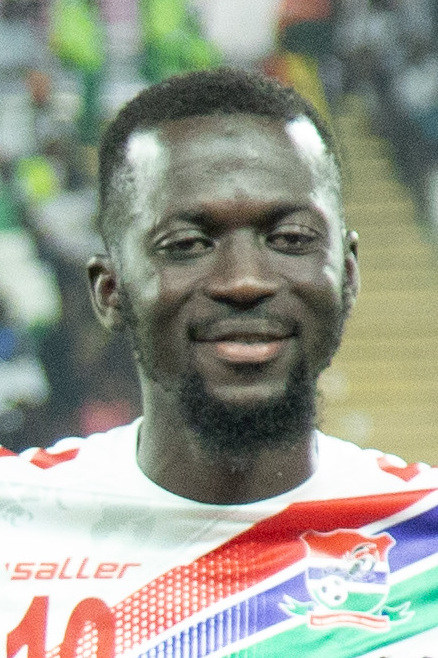
- Barrow in 2024

Personal information
- Full name: Musa Barrow
- Date of birth: 14 November 1998 (age 28)
- Place of birth: Banjul, The Gambia
- Height: 1.83 m (6 ft 0 in)
- Position: Forward

Team information
- Current team: Al-Khaleej
- Number: 99

Youth career
- Hawks
- 2016–2018: Atalanta

Senior career*
Years	Team	Apps	(Gls)
2018–2021	Atalanta	41	(4)
2019–2021	→ Bologna (loan)	56	(17)
2021–2023	Bologna	66	(9)
2023–2026	Al-Taawoun	58	(22)
2026–	Al-Khaleej	11	(3)

International career^{‡}
2018	Gambia U23	1	(1)
2018–	Gambia	55	(16)
- * Club domestic league appearances and goals as of 29 October 2026 ‡ National team caps and goals as of 17 November 2026

Musa Barrow (born 14 November 1998) is a Gambian professional footballer who plays as a forward for Al-Khaleej. He is the all time top goalscorer for the Gambia national team.

== Club career ==
=== Early career ===
Barrow joined Atalanta in 2016 from The Gambia where he played football locally and in the street, and in his first appearance with the youth squad scored two goals from midfield. He joined the first team squad in 2018 after scoring 19 goals in 15 games for the youth side.

=== Atalanta ===
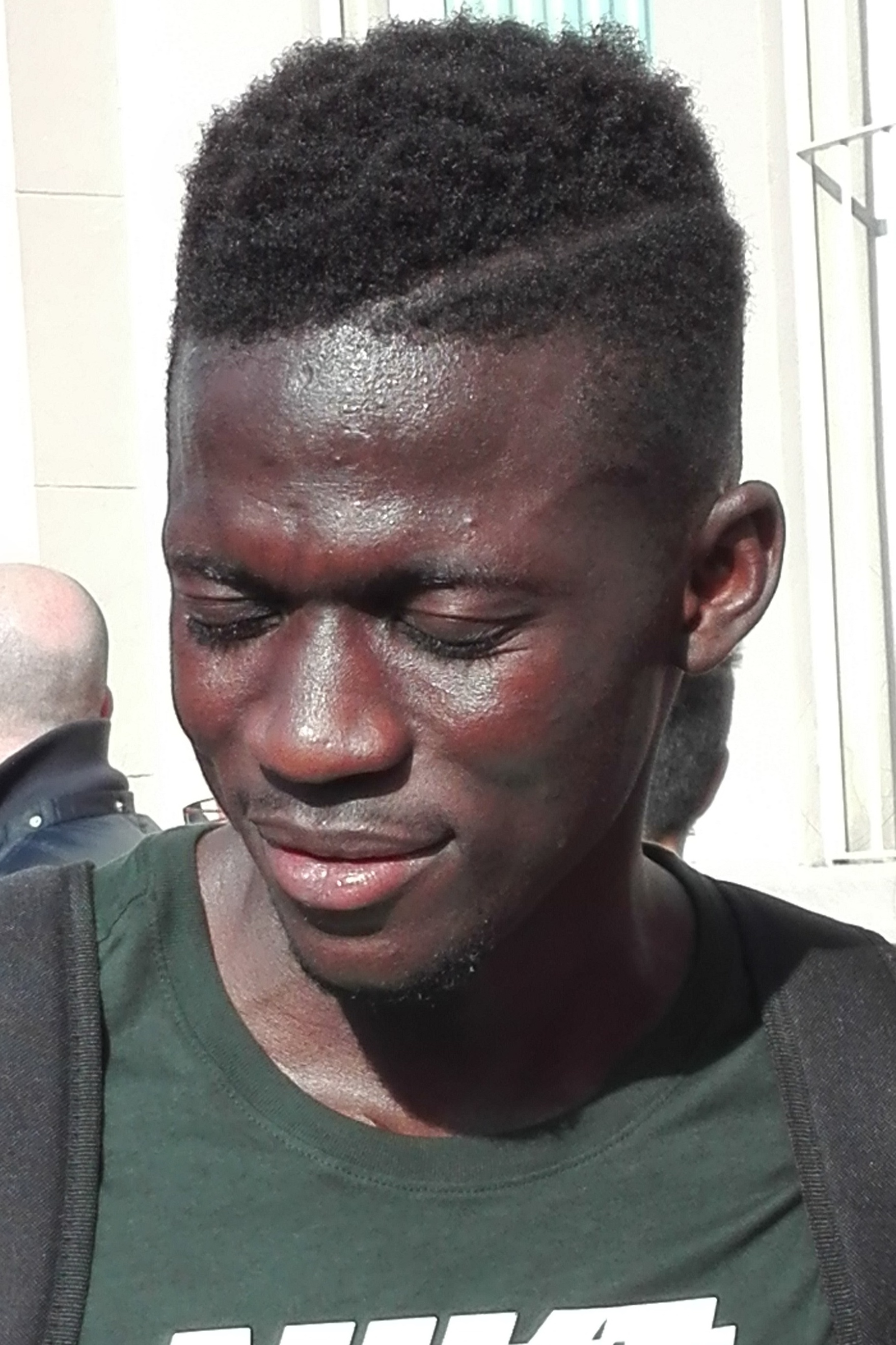
Barrow in 2018

Barrow made his professional debut with Atalanta in a 1–0 Coppa Italia loss to Juventus on 30 January 2018. He made his Serie A debut for Atalanta in a 1–1 tie with Crotone on 10 February 2018.

He had his first start on 13 April 2018 in an 0–0 home draw against Inter Milan.

On 18 September 2019, Barrow made his Champions League debut against Dinamo Zagreb.

=== Bologna ===
On 17 January 2020, Barrow moved from Atalanta to Bologna on loan with an obligation to buy for a fee reported to be around €13 million. Soon after his transfer, Barrow became the starting striker under Siniša Mihajlović and became one of their top scorers of the season despite only arriving in January. On 16 December 2020, Barrow scored a spectacular lob from the middle of the pitch in extra time to earn Bologna a 2–2 draw against Spezia. He finished the season with 8 goals. On 2 July 2021, Bologna purchased his rights.

On 2 April 2023, Barrow scored a goal in Bologna's 3–0 win against Udinese and dedicated it to Mihajlović, who died in December 2022 from leukemia. It was Barrow's third and final Serie A goal of the season, also adding 8 assists.

=== Al-Taawoun ===
On 4 September 2023, Saudi Pro League side Al-Taawoun announced the signing of Barrow on a three-year contract, for a reported fee of €8 million, which could rise to €10 million with bonuses. On 16 September, he scored his first goal on his debut in a 3–2 defeat against Al-Ahli.

== Style of play ==
Barrow plays as a left-sided forward. He often uses his pace to run down the left wing or cut inside and shoot at goal. He is known for his powerful shooting, having scored several goals in the Serie A from outside the box. He received criticism for his lack of goalscoring, but his agent Luigi Sorrentino stated that it is because he has to sacrifice a lot in the defensive phases of the game.

== International career ==
On 1 June 2018, Barrow scored the only goal for the Gambia U23s in a 1–0 friendly win over the Morocco U23s.

Barrow made his debut for the senior Gambia national football team in a 1–1 2019 Africa Cup of Nations qualification draw with Algeria on 8 September 2018.

He played and scored 2 goals in the tournament in the 2021 Africa cup of Nations in Cameroon, his national team's first continental tournament, where they made a sensational quarter-final.

== Career statistics ==
=== Club ===
As of match played 11 March 2025

Appearances and goals by club, season and competition
Club	Season	League			National cup (Note: Includes Coppa Italia, King's Cup)		Continental		Other		Total	
Club	Season	Division	Apps	Goals	Apps	Goals	Apps	Goals	Apps	Goals	Apps	Goals
Atalanta	2017–18	Serie A	12	3	2	0	—		—		14	3
Atalanta	2018–19	Serie A	22	1	2	0	6 (Note: Appearances in UEFA Europa League)	4	—		30	5
Atalanta	2019–20	Serie A	7	0	0	0	1 (Note: Appearance in UEFA Champions League)	0	—		8	0
Atalanta	Total		41	4	4	0	7	4	—		52	8
Bologna (loan)	2019–20	Serie A	18	9	0	0	—		—		18	9
Bologna (loan)	2020–21	Serie A	38	8	2	1	—		—		40	9
Bologna	2021–22	Serie A	34	6	1	0	—		—		35	6
Bologna	2022–23	Serie A	32	3	3	0	—		—		35	3
Bologna	Total		122	26	6	1	—		—		128	27
Al Taawoun	2023–24	Saudi Pro League	21	6	3	1	—		—		24	7
Al Taawoun	2024–25	Saudi Pro League	25	12	3	0	10 (Note: Appearances in AFC Champions League Two)	5	1 (Note: Appearance in Saudi Super Cup)	0	39	17
Al Taawoun	Total		46	18	6	1	10	5	1	0	63	24
Career total			209	46	16	1	17	9	1	0	243	59

=== International ===
As of match played 17 November 2026

Appearances and goals by national team and year
National team	Year	Apps	Goals
Gambia	2018	3	0
Gambia	2019	6	1
Gambia	2020	2	1
Gambia	2021	7	0
Gambia	2022	11	3
Gambia	2023	6	1
Gambia	2024	11	3
Gambia	2025	6	5
Gambia	2026	3	2
Total		55	16

Scores and results list Gambia's goal tally first, score column indicates score after each Barrow goal.

List of international goals scored by Musa Barrow
No.	Date	Venue	Opponent	Score	Result	Competition
1	12 June 2019	Stade de Marrakech, Marrakesh, Morocco	Morocco	1–0	1–0	Friendly
2	16 November 2020	Independence Stadium, Bakau, Gambia	Gabon	2–0	2–1	2021 Africa Cup of Nations qualification
3	16 January 2022	Limbe Stadium, Limbe, Cameroon	Mali	1–1	1–1	2021 Africa Cup of Nations
4	24 January 2022	Kouekong Stadium, Bafoussam, Cameroon	Guinea	1–0	1–0	2021 Africa Cup of Nations
5	29 May 2022	Zabeel Stadium, Dubai, United Arab Emirates	United Arab Emirates	1–1	1–1	Friendly
6	16 November 2023	National Stadium, Dar es Salaam, Tanzania	Burundi	1–2	2–3	2026 FIFA World Cup qualification
7	8 June 2024	Berkane Municipal Stadium, Berkane, Morocco	Seychelles	2–1	5–1	2026 FIFA World Cup qualification
8	4 September 2024	Ben M'Hamed El Abdi Stadium, El Jadida, Morocco	Comoros	1–1	1–1	2025 Africa Cup of Nations qualification
9	14 October 2024	Ben M'Hamed El Abdi Stadium, El Jadida, Morocco	Madagascar	1–0	1–0	2025 Africa Cup of Nations qualification
10	20 March 2025	Alassane Ouattara Stadium, Abidjan, Ivory Coast	Kenya	1–0	3–3	2026 FIFA World Cup qualification
11	20 March 2025	Alassane Ouattara Stadium, Abidjan, Ivory Coast	Kenya	3–2	3–3	2026 FIFA World Cup qualification
12	5 September 2025	Moi International Sports Centre, Nairobi, Kenya	Kenya	3–0	3–1	2026 FIFA World Cup qualification
13	14 October 2025	Côte d'Or National Sports Complex, Saint Pierre, Mauritius	Seychelles	4–0	7–0	2026 FIFA World Cup qualification
14	14 October 2025	Côte d'Or National Sports Complex, Saint Pierre, Mauritius	Seychelles	5–0	7–0	2026 FIFA World Cup qualification
15	12 November 2026	Bouaké Stadium, Bouaké, Ivory Coast	Ivory Coast	1–2	1–2	2027 Africa Cup of Nations qualification
16	17 November 2026	Independence Stadium, Bakau, Gambia	Ivory Coast	2–1	2–2	2027 Africa Cup of Nations qualification
