= Girau do Ponciano =

Municipality in Alagoas, Brazil

- Municipality of Alagoas, Brazil
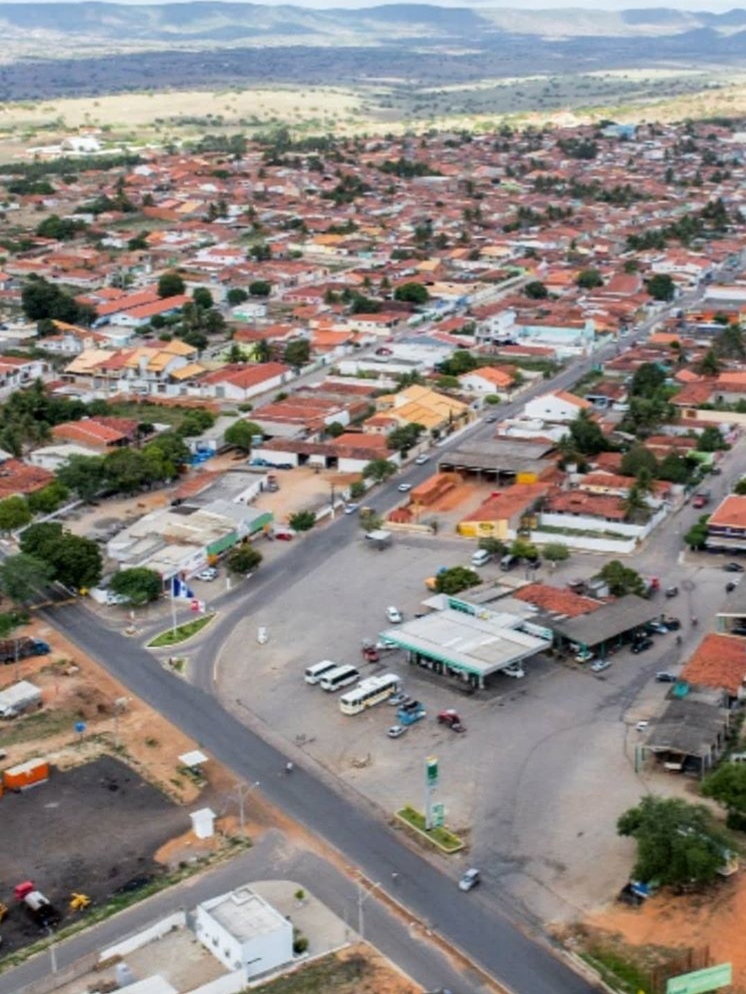
- Aerial view of Girau do Ponciano

- Flag Coat of arms
- Etymology: In English "Ponciano's Girau", Ponciano being one of the first settlers who built a girau (wooden platform) used for hunting
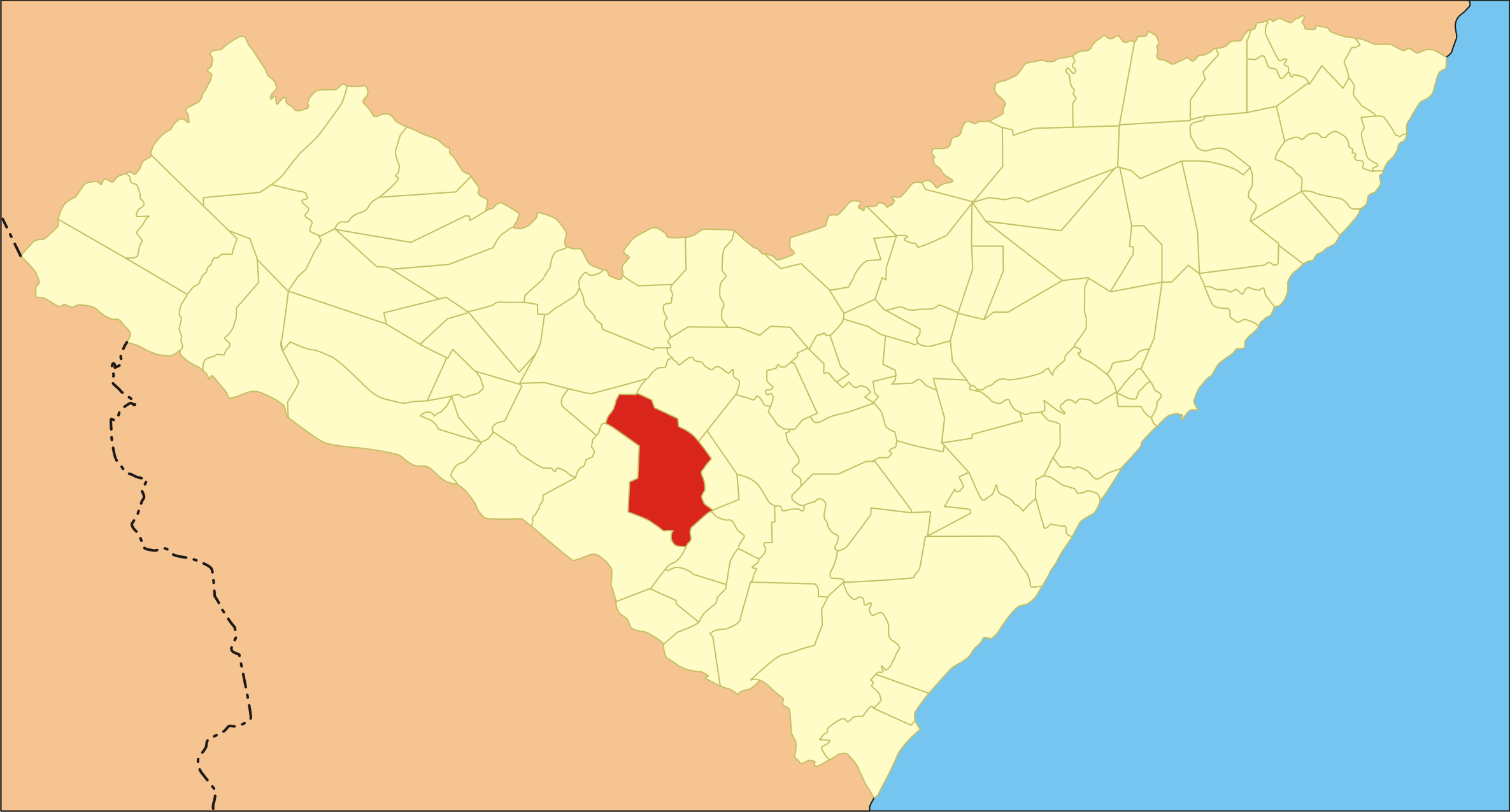
- Location of Girau do Ponciano in Alagoas

- Location within Brazil Location within South America
- Coordinates: 09°53′02″S 36°49′44″W
- Country: Brazil
- Region: Northeast
- State: Alagoas
- Founded: 15 July 1958

Government
  - Mayor: Gilberto Bezerra Barros (PP) (2025-2028)
  - Vice Mayor: Osvaldo Alexandre Santos Junior (PP) (2025-2028)

Area
  - Total: 513.454 km^{2} (198.246 sq mi)
- Elevation: 244 m (801 ft)

Population (2022)
  - Total: 36,102
  - Density: 70.31/km^{2} (182.1/sq mi)
- Demonym: Girauense (Brazilian Portuguese)
- Time zone: UTC-03:00 (Brasília Time)
- Postal Code: 57360-000
- HDI (2010): 0.536 – low
- Website: giraudoponciano.al.gov.br

Girau do Ponciano (Central northeastern portuguese pronunciation: [ʒiˈɾɐw ˈdʊ põsiˈɐ̃nu]) is a municipality located in the west of the Brazilian state of Alagoas. Its population is 36,102 (2022) and its area is 502 km^{2} (194 sq mi).

== See also ==
- List of municipalities in Alagoas
