= Renné Rivas =

Venezuelan footballer (born 2002)

Personal information
- Full name: Renné Alejandro Rivas Alezones
- Date of birth: 21 March 2003 (age 23)
- Place of birth: Venezuela
- Height: 1.83 m (6 ft 0 in)
- Position: Left-back

Team information
- Current team: Al Wahda

Youth career
- –2020: Caracas

Senior career*
Years	Team	Apps	(Gls)
2019–2025	Caracas	80	(1)
2024–2025	→ Al Taawoun (loan)	24	(1)
2025–2026	Al Taawoun	1	(0)
2025–2026	→ Kalba (loan)	23	(5)
2026–	Al Wahda	0	(0)

International career^{‡}
2022–2023	Venezuela U20	11	(1)
2022	Venezuela U21	1	(0)
2023–2024	Venezuela U23	8	(1)
- * Club domestic league appearances and goals as of 25 October 2025 ‡ National team caps and goals as of 12 February 2024

Renné Alejandro Rivas Alezones (born 21 March 2003) is a Venezuelan footballer who plays as a right-back for Al Wahda.

== Club career ==
As a youth player, Rivas joined the youth academy of Venezuelan side Caracas at the age of thirteen and was promoted to the club's senior team in 2019, where he made eighty league appearances and scored one goal.

Following his stint there, he signed for Saudi Arabian side Al Taawoun in 2025. The same year, he was sent on loan to Emirati side Kalba.

== International career ==
Rivas a Venezuela youth international. During January and February 2024, he played for the Venezuela national under-23 football team at the 2024 CONMEBOL Pre-Olympic Tournament.

== Style of play ==
Rivas plays as a defender. Venezuelan news website Diario Meridiano wrote in 2025 that his "speed, dribbling ability, and defensive skills have made him a key player".
