= Ibrahim Al-Shoeil =

Saudi Arabian footballer

Personal information
- Full name: Ibrahim Fahad Al-Shoeil
- Date of birth: November 21, 1994 (age 31)
- Place of birth: Saudi Arabia
- Height: 1.69 m (5 ft 6 1/2 in)
- Position: Left-back

Youth career
- Al-Qadsiah

Senior career*
| Years | Team | Apps | (Gls) |
| 2016–2024 | Al-Qadsiah | 96 | (2) |
| 2024–2026 | Al-Taawoun | 14 | (0) |
- * Club domestic league appearances and goals as of 20 September 2020

Ibrahim Al-Shoeil (Arabic: إبراهيم الشعيل, born 21 November 1994) is a Saudi Arabian football player who currently plays as a left back.

== Career ==
On 27 December 2023, Al-Shoeil signed a two-and-a-half-year contract with Pro League side Al-Taawoun.
