= Mohammed Mahzari =

Saudi Arabian footballer (born 2002)

Personal information
- Full name: Mohammed Matar Mohsen Mahzari
- Date of birth: May 19, 2002 (age 24)
- Place of birth: Dammam, Saudi Arabia
- Height: 1.78 m (5 ft 10 in)
- Positions: Right-back; midfielder

Team information
- Current team: Al-Hilal
- Number: 2

Youth career
- Al-Ettifaq

Senior career*
Years	Team	Apps	(Gls)
2022–2025	Al-Ettifaq	11	(0)
2022–2023	→ Al-Shoulla (loan)	4	(0)
2024–2025	→ Al-Taawoun (loan)	22	(0)
2025–2026	Al-Taawoun	33	(1)
2026–	Al-Hilal	11	(0)

International career^{‡}
2020	Saudi Arabia U20		
2023–2025	Saudi Arabia U23		
2026–	Saudi Arabia	5	(0)
- * Club domestic league appearances and goals as of 31 October 2026 ‡ National team caps and goals as of 6 October 2026

Mohammed Mahzari (Arabic: محمد محزري; born 19 May 2002) is a Saudi Arabian professional footballer who currently plays as a right-back or a midfielder for Saudi Pro League club Al-Hilal and the Saudi Arabia national team.

== Career ==
Mahzari began his career at the youth team of Al-Ettifaq. On 11 October 2020, Mahzari signed his first professional contract with Al-Ettifaq. On 25 August 2022, Mahzari joined Saudi First Division League side Al-Shoulla on a one-year loan. On 14 August 2023, Mahzari made his debut for Al-Ettifaq as a substitute in the 2–1 league win against Al-Nassr. On 4 November 2023, Mahzari made his first start for the club in the 0–0 draw against Al-Raed. On 31 January 2024, Mahzari renewed his contract with Al-Ettifaq before joining Pro League side Al-Taawoun on a one-and-a-half year loan. He made his debut for Al-Taawoun on 23 February 2024 as a substitute in the 3–1 win against Al-Okhdood. On 3 May 2024, Mahzari was substituted off the pitch after getting injured in the league match against Al-Hilal. Later, it was announced that he had injured his ACL and would undergo surgery. On 27 June 2025, Mahzari joined Al-Taawoun on a permanent deal.

== Career statistics ==
=== Club ===
As of match played 27 May 2024

Club	Season	League		King Cup		Asia		Other		Total	
Club	Season	Apps	Goals	Apps	Goals	Apps	Goals	Apps	Goals	Apps	Goals
Al-Ettifaq	2021–22	0	0	0	0	—		—		0	0
Al-Ettifaq	2023–24	11	0	2	0	—		—		13	0
Al-Ettifaq	Al-Ettifaq Total	11	0	2	0	0	0	0	0	13	0
Al-Shoulla (loan)	2022–23	4	0	—		—		—		4	0
Al-Taawoun (loan)	2023–24	7	0	0	0	—		—		7	0
Career totals		22	0	2	0	0	0	0	0	24	0
