= Ahmed Bahusayn =

Saudi Arabian footballer

Ahmed Bahusayn أحمد باحسين
Personal information
- Full name: Ahmed Saleh Bahusayn
- Date of birth: 9 February 2001 (age 25)
- Place of birth: Jeddah, Saudi Arabia
- Height: 1.70 m (5 ft 7 in)
- Position: Midfielder

Youth career
- 2013-2021: Al-Ittihad

Senior career*
Years	Team	Apps	(Gls)
2021–2023	Al-Ittihad	7	(0)
2023	→ Hajer (loan)	11	(0)
2023–2026	Al-Taawoun	56	(1)

International career
2019–2021	Saudi Arabia U20		
2023–	Saudi Arabia U23		
- * Club domestic league appearances and goals as of 27 May 2024

Ahmed Bahusayn (Arabic: أحمد باحسين; born 9 February 2001) is a Saudi professional footballer who plays as a midfielder.

== Career ==
Bahusayn started at Al-Ittihad's youth team and was promoted to the first team during the 2020–21 season. On 16 April 2021, Bahusayn made his professional debut for Al-Ittihad against Al-Batin in the Pro League, replacing Abdulaziz Al-Jebreen. On 20 July 2021, Bahusayn signed his professional contract with the club. On 26 January 2023, Bahusayn joined First Division League side Hajer.

On 5 July 2023, Bahusayn joined Pro League club Al-Taawoun on a two-year contract.
