= Flávio Medeiros =

Brazilian footballer (born 1996)

Personal information
- Full name: Flávio Medeiros da Silva
- Date of birth: 10 February 1996 (age 30)
- Place of birth: Santos, Brazil
- Height: 1.77 m (5 ft 10 in)
- Position: Defensive midfielder

Team information
- Current team: Al Faisaly
- Number: 8

Youth career
- 2006–2012: Santos
- 2013: Palmeiras
- 2014–2015: Vitória

Senior career*
Years	Team	Apps	(Gls)
2015–2017	Vitória	54	(0)
2017	→ Ferroviária (loan)	7	(0)
2017	Boavista II	1	(0)
2018	Santo André	11	(0)
2018–2020	Bahia	58	(0)
2020–2024	Trabzonspor	19	(1)
2021–2022	→ Giresunspor (loan)	35	(0)
2022–2024	→ Al-Taawoun (loan)	43	(2)
2024–2026	Al-Taawoun	37	(0)
2026–	Al Faisaly	7	(1)
- * Club domestic league appearances and goals as of 27 October 2026 (UTC)

Flávio Medeiros da Silva (born 10 February 1996), sometimes known as just Flávio, is a Brazilian professional footballer who plays as a defensive midfielder for a Saudi team Al Faisaly.

== Career ==
Born in Santos, São Paulo, Flávio joined Santos FC's youth setup in 2006, aged ten. Released in 2012, he spent a year at Palmeiras before joining Vitória in 2014.

Flávio was promoted to the main squad in January 2015, after impressing during the year's Copa São Paulo de Futebol Júnior. He made his first team debut on 21 February, coming on as a second-half substitute in a 1–0 Campeonato Baiano home win against Colo Colo.

Flávio scored his first senior goal on 29 March 2015, netting his team's third in a 4–2 home win against América-RN, for the year's Copa do Nordeste. He made his Série B debut on 9 May 2015, starting in a 2–0 home loss against Sampaio Corrêa.

Flávio made his Série A debut on 29 May 2016, replacing Leandro Domingues at half-time in a 1–1 home draw against Atlético Mineiro. On 6 January 2017, he was loaned to Ferroviária until the end of the 2017 Campeonato Paulista.

On 31 August 2017, free agent Flávio moved abroad and joined Primeira Liga side Boavista FC, but only managed to appear 27 minutes for the B-team. On 20 December, he returned to his home country and signed for Santo André.

On 22 March 2018, Flávio moved to Vitória's rivals Bahia, initially assigned to the under-23s.

On 22 August 2020, he went to Turkish side Trabzonspor.

On 22 July 2022, Flávio joined Saudi Arabian club Al-Taawoun on a one-year loan from Trabzonspor. On 12 July 2023, Flávio's loan was renewed for another season. On 29 July 2024, Flávio joined Al-Taawoun on a permanent deal.

== Personal life ==
Flávio's twin brother, Fernando, is also a footballer and a midfielder. He also played at Santos as a youth.

== Honours ==
Vitória

- Campeonato Baiano: 2016

Bahia

- Campeonato Baiano: 2019
- Campeonato Baiano: 2020

Trabzonspor

- Turkish Super Cup: 2020

Individual

- Campeonato Baiano Best newcomer: 2015
