= Muteb Al-Mufarrij =

Saudi Arabian footballer

Personal information
- Full name: Muteb Abdullah Al-Mufarrij
- Date of birth: 19 August 1996 (age 30)
- Place of birth: Riyadh, Saudi Arabia
- Height: 1.81 m (5 ft 11 in)
- Position: Centre back

Team information
- Current team: Al-Taawoun
- Number: 32

Youth career
- 2011–2017: Al-Hilal

Senior career*
Years	Team	Apps	(Gls)
2017–2024	Al-Hilal	20	(0)
2018–2019	→ Al-Taawoun (loan)	18	(0)
2019–2020	→ Al-Shabab (loan)	4	(0)
2024–	Al-Taawoun	9	(1)

International career^{‡}
2017–2019	Saudi Arabia U23		
2019–	Saudi Arabia	5	(0)
- * Club domestic league appearances and goals as of February 22, 2025 ‡ National team caps and goals as of March 31, 2026

Muteb Al-Mufarrij (Arabic: متعب المفرج; born 19 August 1996) is a Saudi Arabian football player who plays as a centre back for Al-Taawoun. He also played for the Saudi Arabia national team in 2019.

== Career statistics ==
=== Club ===
As of match played 31 May 2024

Appearances and goals by club, season and competition
Club	Season	League			King Cup		Asia		Other		Total	
Club	Season	Division	Apps	Goals	Apps	Goals	Apps	Goals	Apps	Goals	Apps	Goals
Al-Hilal	2017–18	Pro League	0	0	0	0	0	0	3 (Note: Appearances in Arab Club Champions Cup)	0	3	0
Al-Hilal	2020–21	Pro League	8	0	0	0	0	0	0	0	8	0
Al-Hilal	2021–22	Pro League	11	0	1	0	4	1	2 (Note: Appearances in FIFA Club World Cup)	0	18	1
Al-Hilal	2022–23	Pro League	0	0	0	0	0	0	0	0	0	0
Al-Hilal	2023–24	Pro League	1	0	0	0	0	0	0	0	1	0
Al-Hilal	Total		20	0	1	0	4	1	5	0	30	1
Al-Taawoun (loan)	2018–19	Pro League	18	0	6	0	—		—		24	0
Al-Shabab (loan)	2019–20	Pro League	4	0	1	0	—		4	0	9	0
Career total			42	0	8	0	4	1	9	0	63	1

== Honours ==
=== Al-Hilal ===
- Saudi Professional League: 2017–18, 2020–21, 2021–22, 2023–24
- Kings Cup: 2019–20, 2022–23, 2023–24
- AFC Champions League: 2021
- Saudi Super Cup: 2018, 2021, 2023

=== Al-Taawoun ===
- Kings Cup: 2019
