= Saad Al-Nasser =

Saudi Arabian footballer

Personal information
- Full name: Saad Fahad Al-Nasser
- Date of birth: 8 January 2001 (age 25)
- Place of birth: Saudi Arabia
- Height: 1.72 m (5 ft 7 1/2 in)
- Position: Left-back

Team information
- Current team: Al-Nassr
- Number: 96

Youth career
- 2015–2021: Al-Hilal

Senior career*
Years	Team	Apps	(Gls)
2021–2023	Al-Hilal	0	(0)
2022–2023	→ Al-Taawoun (loan)	22	(3)
2023–2025	Al-Taawoun	38	(1)
2025–	Al-Nassr	23	(0)

International career^{‡}
2020–2021	Saudi Arabia U20		
2022–2023	Saudi Arabia U23	12	(1)
2023–	Saudi Arabia	5	(0)
Medal record
Men's football
Representing Saudi Arabia
Islamic Solidarity Games
Silver medal – second place	2021 Konya
- * Club domestic league appearances and goals as of 29 October 2026 ‡ National team caps and goals as of 8 September 2025

Saad Fahad Al-Nasser (Arabic: سَعْد فَهْد النَّاصِر; born 8 January 2001) is a Saudi Arabian professional footballer who plays as a left-back for Saudi Pro League club Al-Nassr and the Saudi Arabia national team.

== Club career ==
=== Al-Hilal ===
Al-Nasser started his career at the youth teams of Al-Hilal. On 13 October 2020, Al-Nasser signed his first professional contract with Al-Hilal. He made his debut for Al-Hilal on 27 April 2021 by coming off the bench in the AFC Champions League match against Uzbekistani side AGMK.

==== Loan to Al-Taawoun ====
On 22 July 2022, Al-Nasser joined Al-Taawoun on a season-long loan. He made his debut on 3 September 2022 by coming off the bench in a 1–0 win against Al-Nassr. He scored his first goal for the club on 16 October 2022 in a 1–0 win against Al-Ettifaq.

=== Al-Taawoun ===
On 16 August 2023, Al-Nasser joined Al-Taawoun on a permanent deal.

=== Al-Nassr ===
On 31 August 2025, Al-Nasser signed for Saudi Pro League club Al-Nassr until 2028. He will play alongside the likes of Cristiano Ronaldo, Sadio Mané, Marcelo Brozović, João Félix, Iñigo Martínez and Kingsley Coman.

== International career ==
=== Under-23 ===
Al-Nasser earned his first call-up for the Saudi Arabia U23 national team during the 2021 Islamic Solidarity Games. He made 3 appearances throughout the competition as the Green Falcons finished in second place, earning a silver medal. He was also part of the squad that won the 2022 WAFF U-23 Championship. He appeared in all four matches and scored once, in the final.

=== Senior ===
In January 2023, he received his first call-up to the Saudi Arabia senior national team for the 25th Arabian Gulf Cup. He made 3 appearances as the Green Falcons were eliminated in the group stages.

== Honours ==
Al-Nassr

- Saudi Pro League: 2025–26
