= Sultan Mandash =

Saudi Arabian footballer

Personal information
- Full name: Sultan Ahmed Mohammed Mandash
- Date of birth: October 17, 1994 (age 32)
- Place of birth: Jeddah, Saudi Arabia
- Height: 1.72 m (5 ft 8 in)
- Position: Winger

Team information
- Current team: Al Hilal
- Number: 27

Youth career
- Al-Ittihad

Senior career*
Years	Team	Apps	(Gls)
2014–2017	Al-Ittihad	9	(0)
2015–2016	→ Najran (loan)	18	(0)
2017–2019	Al-Faisaly	33	(3)
2019–2021	Al-Ahli	20	(2)
2020	→ Al-Taawoun (loan)	10	(0)
2021–2024	Al-Fayha	88	(8)
2024–2026	Al-Taawoun	42	(5)
2026–	Al Hilal	26	(7)

International career^{‡}
2015–2016	Saudi Arabia U23		
2019–	Saudi Arabia	13	(2)
- * Club domestic league appearances and goals as of 31 October 2026 ‡ National team caps and goals as of 13 November 2026

Sultan Ahmed Mohammed Mandash (Arabic: سلطان مندش; born October 17, 1994), is a Saudi Arabian footballer who plays as a winger for Al Hilal and the Saudi Arabia national team.

== Club career ==
On 1 June 2024, Mandash joined Al-Taawoun on a two-year deal.

On 11 January 2026, Mandash joined Al Hilal on a two-and-a-half year deal.

== International Career ==
On 31 May 2026, he was named in the 26-man squad for the 2026 FIFA World Cup.

== Career Statistics ==
Scores and results list Saudi Arabia's goal tally first, score column indicates score after each Mandash goal.

List of international goals scored by Sultan Mandash
No.	Date	Venue	Opponent	Score	Result	Competition
1	31 May 2026	Sports Illustrated Stadium, Harrison, United States	Ecuador	1–2	1–2	Friendly
2	5 June 2026	Q2 Stadium, Austin, United States	Puerto Rico	1–0	3–0	Friendly

== Honours ==
Al-Ittihad

- Crown Prince Cup: 2016–17

Al-Fayha

- King Cup: 2021–22
