= 2023–24 Al-Taawoun FC season =

Al-Taawoun
2023–24 season
- Chairman: Saud Al-Rashoodi
- Manager: Péricles Chamusca
- Stadium: King Abdullah Sport City Stadium
- Pro League: 4th
- King Cup: Quarter-finals (knocked out by Al-Hilal)
- Top goalscorer: League: João Pedro (11); All: João Pedro (11)
- Highest home attendance: 20,050 (vs. Al-Hilal, 3 May 2024)
- Lowest home attendance: 2,282 (vs. Al-Qadsiah, 24 September 2023)
- Average home league attendance: 6,816
- All statistics correct as of 6 January 2024.

The 2023–24 season was Al-Taawoun's 68th year in their history and 14th consecutive season in the Pro League. The club participated in the Pro League and the King Cup.

The season covers the period from 1 July 2023 to 30 June 2024.

== Players ==
=== Squad information ===
As of 1 February 2024

Note: Flags indicate national team as defined under FIFA eligibility rules; some limited exceptions apply. Players may hold more than one non-FIFA nationality.

No.	Pos.	Nation	Player
1	GK	BRA	Mailson
4	DF	BRA	Andrei Girotto
5	MF	KSA	Mohammed Mahzari (on loan from Al-Ettifaq)
6	DF	KSA	Mohammed Al-Ghamdi
7	MF	KSA	Sattam Al-Rouqi
8	MF	KSA	Saad Al-Nasser
9	DF	KSA	Abdulmalek Al-Shammeri
11	DF	KSA	Fahad Al-Abdulrazzaq
15	DF	KSA	Abdulmalik Al-Oyayari
16	MF	BRA	Mateus Castro
17	MF	KSA	Ahmed Ashraf
18	MF	NED	Aschraf El Mahdioui
19	MF	ARG	Cristian Guanca (on loan from Al-Shabab)
20	MF	KSA	Nawaf Al-Rashwodi
22	MF	KSA	Mohammed Al-Kuwaykibi (on loan from Al-Ettifaq)
23	DF	KSA	Waleed Al-Ahmed
24	MF	BRA	Flávio Medeiros (on loan from Trabzonspor)

No.	Pos.	Nation	Player
26	DF	KSA	Ibrahim Al-Shoeil
27	GK	KSA	Mohammed Al-Dhulayfi
28	GK	KSA	Saleh Al-Ohaymid (on loan from Al-Ittihad)
29	MF	KSA	Ahmed Bahusayn
30	FW	BRA	João Pedro
34	MF	KSA	Ziyad Al-Refaei
40	DF	KSA	Hassan Rabea
42	DF	KSA	Muath Faqeehi (on loan from Al-Hilal)
55	GK	KSA	Saleh Aboulshamat (on loan from Al-Qadsiah)
66	MF	TUN	Rayan Fourgi
67	MF	KSA	Mohammed Bakr
88	FW	KSA	Abdulfattah Adam
90	MF	KSA	Basil Al-Mehawes
91	MF	KSA	Rakan Al-Tulayhi
93	DF	KSA	Awn Al-Saluli
99	FW	GAM	Musa Barrow

== Transfers and loans ==
=== Transfers in ===
Entry date	Position	No.	Player	From club	Fee	Ref.
30 June 2023	GK	27	(Saudi Arabia) Mohammed Al-Dhulayfi	(Saudi Arabia) Al-Lewaa	End of loan	
30 June 2023	DF	–	(Saudi Arabia) Abdulaziz Al-Meblesh	(Saudi Arabia) Al-Saqer	End of loan	
30 June 2023	DF	–	(Saudi Arabia) Mubarak Motrib	(Saudi Arabia) Al-Rayyan	End of loan	
30 June 2023	MF	66	(Egypt) Mostafa Fathi	(Egypt) Pyramids	End of loan	
30 June 2023	FW	16	(Saudi Arabia) Hussain Al-Maieni	(Saudi Arabia) Al-Orobah	End of loan	
1 July 2023	DF	11	(Saudi Arabia) Fahad Al-Abdulrazaq	(Saudi Arabia) Al-Riyadh	Free	
1 July 2023	DF	23	(Saudi Arabia) Waleed Al-Ahmed	(Saudi Arabia) Al-Faisaly	Free	
5 July 2023	MF	29	(Saudi Arabia) Ahmed Bahusayn	(Saudi Arabia) Al-Ittihad	Free	
18 July 2023	MF	7	(Saudi Arabia) Sattam Al-Rouqi	(Saudi Arabia) Al-Hilal	Free	
20 July 2023	MF	9	(Saudi Arabia) Abdulmalek Al-Shammeri	(Saudi Arabia) Al-Raed	Free	
1 August 2023	MF	16	(Brazil) Mateus Castro	(Japan) Nagoya Grampus	$3,000,000	
6 August 2023	DF	4	(Brazil) Andrei Girotto	(France) Nantes	$4,400,000	
16 August 2023	MF	8	(Saudi Arabia) Saad Al-Nasser	(Saudi Arabia) Al-Hilal	Undisclosed	
2 September 2023	MF	17	(Saudi Arabia) Ahmed Ashraf	(Saudi Arabia) Al-Faisaly	Free	
5 September 2023	FW	99	(The Gambia) Musa Barrow	(Italy) Bologna	$6,480,000	
6 September 2023	FW	30	(Brazil) João Pedro	(United Arab Emirates) Al-Wahda Dubai	Undisclosed	
7 September 2023	MF	32	(Saudi Arabia) Eyad Madani	(Saudi Arabia) Al-Ahli	Undisclosed	
7 September 2023	FW	88	(Saudi Arabia) Abdulfattah Adam	(Saudi Arabia) Al-Nassr	Undisclosed	
1 January 2024	DF	26	(Saudi Arabia) Ibrahim Al-Shoeil	(Saudi Arabia) Al-Qadsiah	Free	
30 January 2024	MF	67	(Saudi Arabia) Mohammed Bakr	(Saudi Arabia) Jeddah	Undisclosed	
25 February 2024	MF	66	(Tunisia) Rayan Fourgi	(United Arab Emirates) Khor Fakkan	Free	

=== Loans in ===
Start date	End date	Position	No.	Player	To club	Fee	Ref.
12 July 2023	End of season	MF	24	(Brazil) Flávio Medeiros	(Turkey) Trabzonspor	$200,000	
23 July 2023	End of season	DF	42	(Saudi Arabia) Muath Faqeehi	(Saudi Arabia) Al-Hilal	None	
7 September 2023	End of season	GK	28	(Saudi Arabia) Saleh Al-Ohaymid	(Saudi Arabia) Al-Ittihad	None	
24 January 2024	End of season	MF	55	(Saudi Arabia) Saleh Aboulshamat	(Saudi Arabia) Al-Qadsiah	None	
30 January 2024	End of season	MF	19	(Argentina) Cristian Guanca	(Saudi Arabia) Al-Shabab	None	
31 January 2024	End of season	MF	5	(Saudi Arabia) Mohammed Mahzari	(Saudi Arabia) Al-Ettifaq	None	
31 January 2024	End of season	MF	22	(Saudi Arabia) Mohammed Al-Kuwaykibi	(Saudi Arabia) Al-Ettifaq	None	

=== Transfers out ===
Exit date	Position	No.	Player	To club	Fee	Ref.
30 June 2023	DF	44	(Saudi Arabia) Ziyad Al-Sahafi	(Saudi Arabia) Al-Ittihad	End of loan	
30 June 2023	MF	9	(Saudi Arabia) Saad Al-Nasser	(Saudi Arabia) Al-Hilal	End of loan	
30 June 2023	MF	24	(Brazil) Flávio Medeiros	(Turkey) Trabzonspor	End of loan	
30 June 2023	FW	49	(Saudi Arabia) Abdullah Radif	(Saudi Arabia) Al-Hilal	End of loan	
30 June 2023	FW	99	(Saudi Arabia) Turki Al-Mutairi	(Saudi Arabia) Al-Hilal	End of loan	
1 July 2023	MF	7	(Saudi Arabia) Fahad Al-Rashidi	(Saudi Arabia) Al-Ahli	Free	
1 July 2023	MF	8	(Saudi Arabia) Sumayhan Al-Nabit	(Saudi Arabia) Al-Ahli	Free	
1 July 2023	MF	17	(Paraguay) Kaku	(United Arab Emirates) Al-Ain	$5,500,000	
1 July 2023	MF	30	(Saudi Arabia) Faisal Al-Mutairi	(Saudi Arabia) Al-Jabalain	Free	
10 July 2023	DF	–	(Saudi Arabia) Mubarak Motrib	(Saudi Arabia) Al-Houra	Free	
17 July 2023	MF	11	(Mali) Yaqoub Alhassan	(Saudi Arabia) Al-Saqer	Free	
18 July 2023	DF	5	(Saudi Arabia) Tareq Abdullah	(Saudi Arabia) Al-Tai	Free	
23 July 2023	MF	66	(Egypt) Mostafa Fathi	(Egypt) Pyramids	$1,000,000	
3 August 2023	DF	2	(Saudi Arabia) Yazeed Al-Bakr	(Saudi Arabia) Al-Hazem	Free	
10 August 2023	DF	25	(Saudi Arabia) Faisal Darwish	(Saudi Arabia) Ohod	Free	
18 August 2023	DF	4	(Brazil) Naldo	(Turkey) Antalyaspor	Free	
31 August 2023	DF	14	(Saudi Arabia) Hassan Kadesh	(Saudi Arabia) Al-Ittihad	$16,000,000	
31 August 2023	FW	3	(Cameroon) Léandre Tawamba	(Saudi Arabia) Al-Okhdood	Free	
7 September 2023	GK	36	(Saudi Arabia) Raghed Al-Najjar	(Saudi Arabia) Al-Nassr	Undisclosed	
7 September 2023	DF	31	(Saudi Arabia) Saad Balobaid	(Saudi Arabia) Al-Ahli	$5,300,000	
12 September 2023	DF	52	(Saudi Arabia) Motaz Hawsawi	(Saudi Arabia) Ohod	Free	
12 September 2023	MF	77	(Saudi Arabia) Hassan Al-Omari	(Saudi Arabia) Al-Tai	Free	
19 September 2023	DF	–	(Saudi Arabia) Khaled Mutahhar	(Saudi Arabia) Al-Saqer	Free	
26 January 2024	MF	10	(Spain) Álvaro Medrán	(Saudi Arabia) Al-Ettifaq	$2,500,000	
31 January 2024	MF	32	(Saudi Arabia) Eyad Madani	(Saudi Arabia) Jeddah	Free	

=== Loans out ===
Start date	End date	Position	No.	Player	To club	Fee	Ref.
9 August 2023	End of season	DF	43	(Saudi Arabia) Emad Al-Qunaian	(Saudi Arabia) Al-Najma	None	
19 August 2023	End of season	FW	–	(Saudi Arabia) Hussain Al-Moeini	(Saudi Arabia) Jeddah	None	
9 September 2023	End of season	GK	50	(Saudi Arabia) Mohammed Al-Dawsari	(Saudi Arabia) Al-Bukiryah	None	
12 September 2023	End of season	FW	70	(Saudi Arabia) Rayan Al-Johani	(Saudi Arabia) Al-Bukiryah	None	
13 September 2023	End of season	MF	21	(Saudi Arabia) Abdullah Al-Hammad	(Saudi Arabia) Al-Najma	None	
15 September 2023	End of season	DF	12	(Saudi Arabia) Sulaiman Hazazi	(Saudi Arabia) Al-Qaisumah	None	
20 September 2023	End of season	MF	13	(Saudi Arabia) Abdulrahman Al-Mughais	(Saudi Arabia) Al-Saqer	None	

== Pre-season ==
15 July 2023 Friendly	Al-Taawoun (Saudi Arabia)	1–4	(Greece) PAOK	Tegelen, Netherlands
18:00 CEST	Medrán 6'	Report	Tzimas 33'; Murg 57'; Vrakas 67', 72'	Stadium: Sportpark De Bakenbos

19 July 2023 Friendly	Al-Taawoun (Saudi Arabia)	2–1	(Belgium) Dender	Beek en Donk, Netherlands
17:00 CEST	Al-Omari 75'; Al-Rouqi 81'	Report		Stadium: Sportpark Beek en Donk

22 July 2023 Friendly	Al-Taawoun (Saudi Arabia)	0–2	(Belgium) Sint-Truidense	Dessel, Belgium
16:00 CEST		Report	Koita; Ito	Stadium: Armand Melis Stadion

28 July 2023 Friendly	Al-Taawoun (Saudi Arabia)	1–3	(Netherlands) NEC	Overasselt, Netherlands
18:00 CEST	Tawamba	Report	Mattsson; Proper; Maas	Stadium: Sportpark De Passelegt

5 August 2023 Friendly	Al-Taawoun (Saudi Arabia)	0–0	(Saudi Arabia) Al-Fayha	Buraidah, Saudi Arabia
19:00 AST		Report		Stadium: Al-Taawoun Club Stadium

== Competitions ==
=== Overview ===
Competition	Record							
Competition	G	W	D	L	GF	GA	GD	Win %
Pro League	34	16	11	7	51	35	+16	47.06
King Cup	3	2	0	1	4	3	+1	66.67
Total	37	18	11	8	55	38	+17	48.65

Updated to match played 27 May 2024
Source: Competitions

=== Pro League ===
==== League table ====
Pos	Team	Pld	W	D	L	GF	GA	GD	Pts	Qualification or relegation
2	Al-Nassr	34	26	4	4	100	42	+58	82	Qualification for AFC Champions League Elite league stage
3	Al-Ahli	34	19	8	7	67	35	+32	65	Qualification for AFC Champions League Elite league stage
4	Al-Taawoun	34	16	11	7	51	35	+16	59	Qualification for AFC Champions League Two group stage
5	Al-Ittihad	34	16	6	12	63	54	+9	54	
6	Al-Ettifaq	34	12	12	10	43	34	+9	48	Qualification for the AGCFF Gulf Club Champions League group stage

Source: SPL
Rules for classification: 1) Points; 2) Head-to-head points; 3) Head-to-head goal difference; 4) Total goal difference; 5) Total goals scored; 6) Fair-play points
(Note: Head-to-head record is used only after all the matches between the teams in question have been played).

==== Results summary ====
Overall								Home						Away					
Pld	W	D	L	GF	GA	GD	Pts	W	D	L	GF	GA	GD	W	D	L	GF	GA	GD
34	16	11	7	51	35	+16	59	9	3	5	28	19	+9	7	8	2	23	16	+7

Last updated: 27 May 2024.
Source: spl.com.sa

==== Results by round ====
Round	1	2	3	4	5	6	7	8	9	10	11	12	13	14	15	16	17	18	19	20	21	22	23	24	25	26	27	28	29	30	31	32	33	34
Ground	A	A	H	A	H	A	H	A	H	H	A	H	A	H	A	H	A	H	H	A	H	A	H	A	H	A	A	H	A	H	A	H	A	H
Result	D	W	W	W	W	L	W	W	W	D	D	D	L	L	W	W	W	L	L	D	W	D	L	D	W	W	D	D	W	L	D	W	D	W
Position	9	7	5	4	2	4	3	3	2	2	3	3	4	5	5	4	4	4	4	4	4	4	5	5	5	5	5	5	4	4	4	4	4	4

Updated to match(es) played on 27 May 2024. Source: spl.com.sa
A = Away; H = Home; W = Win; D = Draw; L = Loss

==== Matches ====
All times are local, AST (UTC+3).

Win Draw Loss Postponed

13 August 2023 1	Al-Fateh	1–1	Al-Taawoun	Al-Hasa
21:00	Al-Buraikan 24'; Al-Zubaidi (yellow card) 57'; Al-Fuhaid (yellow card) 90+8'	Report	El Mahdioui (yellow card) 38'; Lajami 45+1' (o.g.); Al-Oyayari (yellow card) 87'	Stadium: Prince Abdullah bin Jalawi Stadium; Attendance: 5,242; Referee: Sami Al-Jires

18 August 2023 2	Al-Nassr	0–2	Al-Taawoun	Riyadh
21:00	Al-Khaibari (yellow card) 22'; Talisca (yellow card) 53'	Report	Tawamba 20'; Al-Oyayari (yellow card) 45+6'; Al-Ahmed (yellow card) 61'; Bahusayn 90+6'	Stadium: Al-Awwal Park; Attendance: 20,096; Referee: Khaled Al-Teris

25 August 2023 3	Al-Taawoun	1–0	Abha	Buraidah
21:00	Castro 85'; Al-Ghamdi (yellow card) 87'	Report	Al-Jumayah (yellow card) 45+1'; Tătărușanu (yellow card) 84'	Stadium: Al-Taawoun Club Stadium; Attendance: 4,434; Referee: Abdullah Al-Kharboush

29 August 2023 4	Al-Okhdood	0–1	Al-Taawoun	Najran
18:00	Al Saleem (yellow card) 81'; Al-Zabdani (yellow card) 87'; Al-Muwallad (yellow card) 90+1'	Report	Castro 45+9'; Girotto (yellow card) 55'; Al-Abdulrazzaq (yellow card) 90+5'	Stadium: Prince Hathloul bin Abdul Aziz Sports City; Attendance: 1,520; Referee: Mamdouh Al Shahdan

2 September 2023 5	Al-Taawoun	4–1	Al-Wehda	Buraidah
21:00	Flávio 10'; Al-Rouqi 28'; Al-Ahmed (yellow card) 40', (goal) 62'; Faqeehi (yellow card) 52'; Girotto 85', (yellow card) 88'; Mailson (yellow card) 88'	Report	Fajr 90' (pen.)	Stadium: Al-Taawoun Club Stadium; Attendance: 4,197; Referee: Abdullah Al-Shehri

16 September 2023 6	Al-Ahli	3–2	Al-Taawoun	Jeddah
21:00	Hindi 4', (yellow card) 87' (yellow-red card) 90+4'; Al-Ahmed 23' (o.g.); Majrashi (yellow card) 45+1'; Ibañez (yellow card) 60'; Saint-Maximin 67'; Al-Hurayji (yellow card) 90+10'	Report	Pedro 45+3'; Barrow 51'; Flávio (yellow card) 66'; Medrán (red card) 90+4'	Stadium: Prince Abdullah Al Faisal Stadium; Attendance: 16,175; Referee: Andrés Matonte (Uruguay)

21 September 2023 7	Al-Taawoun	2–1	Al-Raed	Buraidah
18:00	Pedro 9', (yellow card) 41'; Al-Ahmed 16'; Girotto (yellow card) 84'	Report	Gonzalez 39'; M. Al-Dossari (yellow card) 61'; Al-Beshe (yellow card) 79'	Stadium: King Abdullah Sport City Stadium; Attendance: 8,079; Referee: Mohammed Al-Hoaish

29 September 2023 8	Al-Hazem	1–3	Al-Taawoun	Ar Rass
18:00	Selemani (yellow card) 52'; Tozé 72' (pen.)	Report	Barrow 59'; Adam 86'; Al-Rouqi 90+14'	Stadium: Al-Hazem Club Stadium; Attendance: 959; Referee: Faisal Al-Blwi

5 October 2023 9	Al-Taawoun	3–0	Al-Tai	Buraidah
18:00	Barrow 11'; Pedro 13'; Medrán 57'	Report	Dugandžić (yellow card) 6'; Mensah (yellow card) 38'	Stadium: Al-Taawoun Club Stadium; Attendance: 3,244; Referee: Sami Al-Jires

20 October 2023 10	Al-Taawoun	1–1	Al-Ittihad	Buraidah
18:00	Benzema 26' (o.g.); Flávio (yellow card) 90+1'	Report	Benzema 22'; Hamdallah (yellow card) 38'; Felipe (yellow card) 90+1'	Stadium: King Abdullah Sport City Stadium; Attendance: 9,487; Referee: Georgi Kabakov (Bulgaria)

26 October 2023 11	Al-Khaleej	1–1	Al-Taawoun	Dammam
18:00	López 35', (yellow card) 78'; Narey (yellow card) 42'	Report	Al-Oyayari (yellow card) 12'; Flávio (yellow card) 30'; Pedro 37'; Faqeehi (yellow card) 90+6'	Stadium: Prince Mohamed bin Fahd Stadium; Attendance: 1,992; Referee: Mamdouh Al Shahdan

5 November 2023 12	Al-Taawoun	0–0	Damac	Buraidah
18:00	El Mahdioui (yellow card) 35'; Flávio (yellow card) 78'	Report	Stanciu (yellow card) 45+4'	Stadium: Al-Taawoun Club Stadium; Attendance: 4,186; Referee: Abdulsamad Bakri

10 November 2023 13	Al-Hilal	2–0	Al-Taawoun	Riyadh
18:00	Al-Tambakti (yellow card) 11'; Mitrović 81', (yellow card) 90+3'; Kanno 90+9'	Report	Al-Oyayari (yellow card) 13'; Faqeehi (yellow card) 76'; Al-Abdulrazzaq (yellow card) 80'; Al-Nasser (yellow card) 90+8'	Stadium: King Fahd International Stadium; Attendance: 28,144; Referee: Iván Barton (El Salvador)

24 November 2023 14	Al-Taawoun	1–2	Al-Riyadh	Buraidah
18:00	Pedro 4'; Adam (red card) 62'	Report	Al Abbas 72'; Al-Shuwayyi (yellow card) 83'; Al-Nowaiqi (yellow card) 90+4'; Touré 90+10' (pen.); Al-Shuwayrikh (yellow card) 90+11' (yellow-red card) 90+11'	Stadium: Al-Taawoun Club Stadium; Attendance: 3,611; Referee: Shukri Al-Hanfoush

2 December 2023 15	Al-Shabab	1–2	Al-Taawoun	Riyadh
21:00	Carrasco 33' (pen.); Cuéllar (yellow card) 56'	Report	Faqeehi (yellow card) 21'; Pedro 55', 62', (yellow card) 90+2'; Bahusayn (yellow card) 82'	Stadium: Al-Shabab Club Stadium; Attendance: 8,134; Referee: Anastasios Sidiropoulos (Greece)

8 December 2023 16	Al-Taawoun	4–1	Al-Fayha	Buraidah
18:00	Castro 15'; El Mahdioui 40' (pen.); Barrow 62'; Adam 84'	Report	Sakala 6'	Stadium: Al-Taawoun Club Stadium; Attendance: 3,170; Referee: Sami Al-Jires

16 December 2023 17	Al-Ettifaq	0–2	Al-Taawoun	Dammam
21:00	Abdulrahman (yellow card) 90+1'	Report	El Mahdioui 41' (pen.); Pedro (yellow card) 55'; Castro 63'	Stadium: Prince Mohamed bin Fahd Stadium; Attendance: 5,083; Referee: Shukri Al-Hanfoush

23 December 2023 18	Al-Taawoun	1–3	Al-Fateh	Buraidah
18:00	Al-Abdulrazzaq (yellow card) 29'; Adam (yellow card) 54'; Pedro 90+4'	Report	Al-Masoud (yellow card) 27'; Al-Najdi 30'; Al-Shurafa 35', 45+2'; Bendebka (yellow card) 41'; Saâdane (yellow card) 90'; Baattia (yellow card) 90+6'	Stadium: Al-Taawoun Club Stadium; Attendance: 3,494; Referee: Abdullah Al-Shehri

30 December 2023 19	Al-Taawoun	1–4	Al-Nassr	Buraidah
21:00	El Mahdioui 13'; Al-Oyayari (yellow card) 42'; Al-Saluli (yellow card) 44'	Report	Al-Amri (yellow card) 11'; Ronaldo (yellow card) 11', (goal) 90+2'; Brozović 26'; Laporte 35'; Otávio 50'; Al-Khaibari (yellow card) 77'	Stadium: King Abdullah Sport City Stadium; Attendance: 18,113; Referee: Mohammed Al-Hoaish

15 February 2024 20	Abha	1–1	Al-Taawoun	Abha
17:00	Al-Jumayah (yellow card) 45+6'; Al-Ali (yellow card) 54'; Al-Ahmed 90+3' (o.g.); Al-Mutairi (yellow card) 90+9'	Report	Flávio (yellow card) 57'; Al-Shoeil (yellow card) 89'; El Mahdioui 90+6'; Al-Dhulayfi (yellow card) 90+8'	Stadium: Prince Sultan bin Abdul Aziz Stadium; Attendance: 505; Referee: Faisal Al-Blwi

23 February 2024 21	Al-Taawoun	3–1	Al-Okhdood	Buraidah
17:00	Barrow 7'; Adam 10'; Flávio (yellow card) 38'; Bahusayn (yellow card) 83'; Al-Kuwaykibi 86'	Report	Vítor (yellow card) 30'; Al-Rubaie 57'; Tănase (yellow card) 68'	Stadium: Al-Taawoun Club Stadium; Attendance: 3,883; Referee: Sebastían Zunino (Argentine)

29 February 2024 22	Al-Wehda	3–3	Al-Taawoun	Mecca
17:00	Ighalo 20', 74' (pen.); Fajr 35'; Makki (yellow card) 56'	Report	Barrow 28'; Castro 45', 86'; Al-Oyayari (yellow card) 48'	Stadium: King Abdul Aziz Stadium; Attendance: 782; Referee: Fareeh Al-Jaloud

9 March 2024 23	Al-Taawoun	0–1	Al-Ahli	Buraidah
20:00	Girotto (yellow card) 21'; Aboulshamat (yellow card) 90+3'	Report	Al-Buraikan 82'	Stadium: King Abdullah Sport City Stadium; Attendance: 14,179; Referee: Sami Al-Jires

16 March 2024 24	Al-Raed	0–0	Al-Taawoun	Buraidah
22:00	Al-Jayzani (yellow card) 45+2'; Gonzalez (yellow card) 45+6'	Report	Al-Abdulrazzaq (yellow card) 45+3'; Flávio (yellow card) 90+8'	Stadium: King Abdullah Sport City Stadium; Attendance: 15,473; Referee: Faisal Al-Blwi

29 March 2024 25	Al-Taawoun	4–0	Al-Hazem	Buraidah
22:00	Girotto 62'; Adam 66', 76'; Al-Kuwaykibi 71'	Report		Stadium: Al-Taawoun Club Stadium; Attendance: 3,271; Referee: Abdulsamad Bakri

2 April 2024 26	Al-Tai	2–3	Al-Taawoun	Ha'il
22:00	Girotto 20' (o.g.); Dugandžić 30'; Al-Moasher (yellow card) 72'	Report	Al-Shammeri 45+2'; Pedro 73'; Al-Abdulrazzaq (yellow card) 77'; Al-Kuwaykibi 86'	Stadium: Prince Abdul Aziz bin Musa'ed Stadium; Attendance: 7,022; Referee: Abdullah Al-Kharboush

5 April 2024 27	Al-Ittihad	0–0	Al-Taawoun	Jeddah
22:00	Romarinho (yellow card) 80'	Report		Stadium: King Abdullah Sports City; Attendance: 9,648; Referee: César Soto Grado (Spain)

18 April 2024 28	Al-Taawoun	1–1	Al-Khaleej	Buraidah
18:00	Adam 21'; Al-Ghamdi (yellow card) 62'	Report	Al-Saluli 45+5' (o.g.); Jung Woo-young (yellow card) 64'; Martins (yellow card) 88'	Stadium: Al-Taawoun Club Stadium; Attendance: 3,275; Referee: Raed Al-Zahrani

26 April 2024 29	Damac	0–1	Al-Taawoun	Khamis Mushait
18:00	Stanciu (yellow card) 47'; Al-Zain (red card) 88'; Zeghba (yellow card) 90+1'	Report	Pedro (yellow card) 45', (goal) 89'; Al-Ghamdi (yellow card) 57'	Stadium: Damac Club Stadium; Attendance: 337; Referee: Shukri Al-Hanfoush

3 May 2024 30	Al-Taawoun	0–3	Al-Hilal	Buraidah
18:00	Faqeehi (yellow card) 30'; Al-Ghamdi (yellow card) 38'	Report	Mitrović (yellow card) 20', (goal) 40'; Milinković-Savić (yellow card) 61'; Abdulhamid 70'; Kanno (yellow card) 90+5'; Al-Shehri 90+7'	Stadium: King Abdullah Sport City Stadium; Attendance: 20,050; Referee: Sascha Stegemann (Germany)

9 May 2024 31	Al-Riyadh	0–0	Al-Taawoun	Riyadh
18:00		Report	Al-Kuwaykibi (yellow card) 52'	Stadium: Prince Faisal bin Fahd Stadium; Attendance: 1,146; Referee: Mohammed Al-Hoaish

18 May 2024 32	Al-Taawoun	1–0	Al-Shabab	Buraidah
19:20	Al-Ahmed (yellow card) 24'; Pedro 52' (pen.)	Report	Rakitić (yellow card) 64'	Stadium: Al-Taawoun Club Stadium; Attendance: 4,607; Referee: Sami Al-Jires

23 May 2024 33	Al-Fayha	1–1	Al-Taawoun	Al Majma'ah
21:00	Sakala 12'; Cimirot (yellow card) 27'; Ryller (yellow card) 44'; Al-Baqawi (red card) 90+10'; Sabiri (yellow card) 90+10'	Report	Al-Oyayari 9'; Al-Saluli (yellow card) 62'; Flávio (yellow card) 90+6'	Stadium: Al Majma'ah Sports City; Attendance: 1,214; Referee: Abdullah Al-Kharboush

27 May 2024 34	Al-Taawoun	1–0	Al-Ettifaq	Buraidah
21:00	El Mahdioui (yellow card) 45+7'; Al-Oyayari 90', (yellow card) 90+1'	Report	Hazazi (yellow card) 45+5'; Al-Otaibi (yellow card) 75'	Stadium: Al-Taawoun Club Stadium; Attendance: 4,591; Referee: Mohammed Al-Hoaish

=== King Cup ===
All times are local, AST (UTC+3).

24 September 2023 Round of 32	Al-Taawoun	2–0	Al-Qadsiah	Buraidah
18:00	Barrow 9'; Faqeehi (yellow card) 27'; Girotto (yellow card) 63'; Al-Abdulrazzaq (yellow card) 68'; Al-Shammeri (yellow card) 75'; Adam 90+7'	Report	Hack (yellow card) 13'; Hazazi (yellow card) 73'	Stadium: Al-Taawoun Club Stadium; Attendance: 2,282; Referee: Abdulsamad Bakri

31 October 2023 Round of 16	Al-Taawoun	2–0	Al-Wehda	Buraidah
15:15	Munir 1' (o.g.); Medrán 11', (yellow card) 73'; El Mahdioui (yellow card) 81'	Report	Bakshween (yellow card) 20'; Al Hejji (yellow card) 27'; Fajr (yellow card) 81'	Stadium: Al-Taawoun Club Stadium; Attendance: 3,416; Referee: Mohammed Al-Hoaish

11 December 2023 Quarter-finals	Al-Hilal	3–0	Al-Taawoun	Riyadh
17:45	Michael 45+2'; Mitrović 52'; Malcom 84'	Report		Stadium: Prince Faisal bin Fahd Stadium; Attendance: Andrés Merlos (Argentina); Referee: 11,467

== Statistics ==
=== Appearances ===
Last updated on 27 May 2024.

No.	Pos	Nat	Player	Total		Pro League		King Cup	
No.	Pos	Nat	Player	Apps	Goals	Apps	Goals	Apps	Goals
Goalkeepers
1	GK	(Brazil) BRA	Mailson	37	0	34	0	3	0
27	GK	(Saudi Arabia) KSA	Mohammed Al-Dhulayfi	0	0	0	0	0	0
28	GK	(Saudi Arabia) KSA	Saleh Al-Ohaymid	0	0	0	0	0	0
Defenders
4	DF	(Brazil) BRA	Andrei Girotto	31	2	28	2	3	0
6	DF	(Saudi Arabia) KSA	Mohammed Al-Ghamdi	17	0	10+7	0	0	0
9	DF	(Saudi Arabia) KSA	Abdulmalek Al-Shammeri	10	1	2+7	1	0+1	0
11	DF	(Saudi Arabia) KSA	Fahad Al-Abdulrazaq	21	0	7+12	0	1+1	0
23	DF	(Saudi Arabia) KSA	Waleed Al-Ahmed	25	2	20+3	2	2	0
26	DF	(Saudi Arabia) KSA	Ibrahim Al-Shoeil	9	0	6+3	0	0	0
40	DF	(Saudi Arabia) KSA	Hassan Rabee	0	0	0	0	0	0
42	DF	(Saudi Arabia) KSA	Muath Faqeehi	27	0	20+4	0	3	0
93	DF	(Saudi Arabia) KSA	Awn Al-Saluli	29	0	20+6	0	1+2	0
Midfielders
5	MF	(Saudi Arabia) KSA	Mohammed Mahzari	7	0	2+5	0	0	0
7	MF	(Saudi Arabia) KSA	Sattam Al-Rouqi	20	2	2+17	2	0+1	0
8	MF	(Saudi Arabia) KSA	Saad Al-Nasser	12	0	7+4	0	1	0
15	MF	(Saudi Arabia) KSA	Abdulmalik Al-Oyayari	27	2	23+2	2	2	0
16	MF	(Brazil) BRA	Mateus Castro	21	6	19	6	2	0
17	MF	(Saudi Arabia) KSA	Ahmed Ashraf	7	0	0+7	0	0	0
18	MF	(Netherlands) NED	Aschraf El Mahdioui	36	4	33	4	3	0
19	MF	(Argentina) ARG	Cristian Guanca	14	0	11+3	0	0	0
20	MF	(Saudi Arabia) KSA	Nawaf Al-Rashwodi	1	0	0+1	0	0	0
22	MF	(Saudi Arabia) KSA	Mohammed Al-Kuwaykibi	15	3	13+2	3	0	0
24	MF	(Brazil) BRA	Flávio Medeiros	35	1	32	1	3	0
29	MF	(Saudi Arabia) KSA	Ahmed Bahusayn	30	1	11+16	1	1+2	0
55	MF	(Saudi Arabia) KSA	Saleh Aboulshamat	2	0	0+2	0	0	0
66	MF	(Tunisia) TUN	Rayan Fourgi	1	0	0+1	0	0	0
67	MF	(Saudi Arabia) KSA	Mohammed Bakr	1	0	0+1	0	0	0
91	MF	(Saudi Arabia) KSA	Rakan Al-Tulayhi	1	0	0+1	0	0	0
Forwards
30	FW	(Brazil) BRA	João Pedro	28	11	25	11	3	0
88	FW	(Saudi Arabia) KSA	Abdulfattah Adam	24	7	6+15	6	0+3	1
99	FW	(The Gambia) GAM	Musa Barrow	24	7	18+3	6	3	1
Players sent out on loan this season
70	FW	(Saudi Arabia) KSA	Rayan Al-Johani	0	0	0	0	0	0
Player who made an appearance this season but have left the club
3	FW	(Cameroon) CMR	Léandre Tawamba	4	1	4	1	0	0
10	MF	(Spain) ESP	Álvaro Medrán	19	2	17	1	2	1
14	DF	(Saudi Arabia) KSA	Hassan Kadesh	4	0	4	0	0	0
31	DF	(Saudi Arabia) KSA	Saad Balobaid	3	0	0+3	0	0	0
32	MF	(Saudi Arabia) KSA	Eyad Madani	1	0	0+1	0	0	0
36	GK	(Saudi Arabia) KSA	Raghed Al-Najjar	0	0	0	0	0	0
77	MF	(Saudi Arabia) KSA	Hassan Al-Omari	1	0	0+1	0	0	0

=== Goalscorers ===
Rank	No.	Pos	Nat	Name	Pro League	King Cup	Total
1	30	FW	(Brazil)	João Pedro	11	0	11
2	88	FW	(Saudi Arabia)	Abdulfattah Adam	6	1	7
2	99	FW	(The Gambia)	Musa Barrow	6	1	7
4	16	MF	(Brazil)	Mateus Castro	6	0	6
5	18	MF	(Netherlands)	Aschraf El Mahdioui	4	0	4
6	22	MF	(Saudi Arabia)	Mohammed Al-Kuwaykibi	3	0	3
7	4	DF	(Brazil)	Andrei Girotto	2	0	2
7	7	MF	(Saudi Arabia)	Sattam Al-Rouqi	2	0	2
7	10	MF	(Spain)	Álvaro Medrán	1	1	2
7	15	MF	(Saudi Arabia)	Abdulmalik Al-Oyayari	2	0	2
7	23	DF	(Saudi Arabia)	Waleed Al-Ahmed	2	0	2
12	3	FW	(Cameroon)	Léandre Tawamba	1	0	1
12	9	DF	(Saudi Arabia)	Abdulmalek Al-Shammeri	1	0	1
12	24	MF	(Brazil)	Flávio Medeiros	1	0	1
12	29	MF	(Saudi Arabia)	Ahmed Bahusayn	1	0	1
Own goal					2	1	3
Total					51	4	55

Last Updated: 27 May 2024

=== Assists ===
Rank	No.	Pos	Nat	Name	Pro League	King Cup	Total
1	10	MF	(Spain)	Álvaro Medrán	8	0	8
2	16	MF	(Brazil)	Mateus Castro	5	1	6
2	22	MF	(Saudi Arabia)	Mohammed Al-Kuwaykibi	6	0	6
4	18	MF	(Netherlands)	Aschraf El Mahdioui	3	0	3
4	24	MF	(Brazil)	Flávio Medeiros	3	0	3
6	29	MF	(Saudi Arabia)	Ahmed Bahusayn	2	0	2
6	99	FW	(The Gambia)	Musa Barrow	2	0	2
8	4	DF	(Brazil)	Andrei Girotto	1	0	1
8	7	MF	(Saudi Arabia)	Sattam Al-Rouqi	1	0	1
8	8	MF	(Saudi Arabia)	Saad Al-Nasser	1	0	1
8	17	MF	(Saudi Arabia)	Ahmed Ashraf	1	0	1
8	19	MF	(Argentina)	Cristian Guanca	1	0	1
8	30	FW	(Brazil)	João Pedro	1	0	1
Total					35	1	36

Last Updated: 27 May 2024

=== Clean sheets ===
Rank	No.	Pos	Nat	Name	Pro League	King Cup	Total
1	1	GK	(Brazil)	Mailson	13	2	15
Total					13	2	15

Last Updated: 27 May 2024
