= 2023–24 Al-Nassr FC season =

Al-Nassr
2023–24 season
- President: Musalli Al-Muammar
- Head coach: Luís Castro
- Stadium: Al-Awwal Park
- Pro League: 2nd
- King's Cup: Runners-up
- AFC Champions League: Quarter-finals
- Arab Club Champions Cup: Winners
- Saudi Super Cup: Semi-finals
- Top goalscorer: League: Cristiano Ronaldo (35); All: Cristiano Ronaldo (50)
- Highest home attendance: 23,878 v Al-Ain; 11 March 2024; AFC Champions League
- Lowest home attendance: 6,093 v Al-Fayha; 19 April 2024; Saudi Pro League
- Average home league attendance: 17,822
Home colours	Away colours	Third colours

The 2023–24 season was Al-Nassr's 48th consecutive season in the top flight of Saudi football and 68th year in existence as a football club. The club participated in the Pro League, the King's Cup, the AFC Champions League, the Arab Club Champions Cup, and the Super Cup.

The season covers the period from 1 July 2023 to 30 June 2024. Most importantly, on 27 May 2024, against Al-Ittihad, Ronaldo scored his 34th and 35th league goals of the season, setting a record most goals scored in a single Saudi Pro League campaign. He also became the first footballer to finish as top scorer in four different leagues.

== Players ==
=== Squad information ===
As of 1 February 2024

Note: Flags indicate national team as defined under FIFA eligibility rules; some limited exceptions apply. Players may hold more than one non-FIFA nationality.

No.	Pos.	Nation	Player
2	DF	KSA	Sultan Al-Ghannam (vice-captain)
4	DF	KSA	Mohammed Al-Fatil
5	DF	KSA	Abdulelah Al-Amri
7	FW	POR	Cristiano Ronaldo (captain)
8	MF	KSA	Abdulmajeed Al-Sulaiheem
10	FW	SEN	Sadio Mané
12	DF	KSA	Nawaf Boushal
14	MF	KSA	Sami Al-Najei
15	DF	BRA	Alex Telles
16	FW	KSA	Mohammed Maran
17	MF	KSA	Abdullah Al-Khaibari
19	MF	KSA	Ali Al-Hassan
23	MF	KSA	Ayman Yahya
24	DF	KSA	Mohammed Qassem
25	MF	POR	Otávio
26	GK	COL	David Ospina
27	DF	ESP	Aymeric Laporte

No.	Pos.	Nation	Player
29	MF	KSA	Abdulrahman Ghareeb
30	FW	KSA	Meshari Al-Nemer
31	MF	KSA	Mohammed Sahlouli
33	GK	KSA	Waleed Abdullah
36	GK	KSA	Raghed Al-Najjar
37	GK	KSA	Fares Afandi
41	GK	KSA	Mohammed Al-Otaibi
44	GK	KSA	Nawaf Al-Aqidi
46	MF	KSA	Abdulaziz Al-Aliwa
49	DF	KSA	Awad Aman
55	DF	KSA	Abdulaziz Al-Faraj
66	DF	KSA	Waleed Ayash
69	DF	KSA	Marzouq Tombakti
77	MF	CRO	Marcelo Brozović
78	DF	KSA	Ali Lajami
94	MF	BRA	Talisca

=== Out on loan ===
Note: Flags indicate national team as defined under FIFA eligibility rules; some limited exceptions apply. Players may hold more than one non-FIFA nationality.

No.	Pos.	Nation	Player
1	GK	KSA	Amin Bukhari (on loan to Al-Ettifaq)
3	DF	KSA	Abdullah Madu (on loan to Al-Ettifaq)
6	MF	CIV	Seko Fofana (on loan to Al-Ettifaq)
13	DF	CIV	Ghislain Konan (on loan to Al-Fayha)
20	DF	KSA	Hamad Al Mansour (on loan to Al-Okhdood)
21	MF	KSA	Mukhtar Ali (on loan to Al-Fateh)

No.	Pos.	Nation	Player
42	DF	KSA	Mansour Al-Shammari (on loan to Al-Jabalain)
56	FW	KSA	Fahad Al-Zubaidi (on loan to Al-Orobah)
58	DF	KSA	Aser Hawsawi (on loan to Jeddah)
59	DF	KSA	Yousef Haqawi (on loan to Al-Fayha)
—	DF	KSA	Majed Qasheesh (on loan to Al-Hazem)

== Transfers and loans ==
=== Transfers in ===
Entry date	Position	No.	Player	From club	Fee	Ref.
30 June 2023	GK	–	(Saudi Arabia) Raed Ozaybi	(Saudi Arabia) Al-Faisaly	End of loan	
30 June 2023	GK	–	(Saudi Arabia) Abdulrahman Al-Shammari	(Saudi Arabia) Najran	End of loan	
30 June 2023	DF	24	(Saudi Arabia) Mansour Al-Shammari	(Saudi Arabia) Al-Ahli	End of loan	
30 June 2023	DF	28	(South Korea) Kim Jin-su	(South Korea) Jeonbuk Hyundai Motors	End of loan	
30 June 2023	DF	58	(Saudi Arabia) Aser Hawsawi	(Saudi Arabia) Al-Okhdood	End of loan	
30 June 2023	DF	86	(Saudi Arabia) Nawaf Al-Mutairi	(Saudi Arabia) Al-Orobah	End of loan	
30 June 2023	MF	11	(Saudi Arabia) Khalid Al-Ghannam	(Saudi Arabia) Al-Fateh	End of loan	
30 June 2023	MF	21	(Saudi Arabia) Mukhtar Ali	(Saudi Arabia) Al-Tai	End of loan	
30 June 2023	MF	52	(Saudi Arabia) Khalil Al-Absi	(Saudi Arabia) Al-Tai	End of loan	
30 June 2023	MF	53	(Saudi Arabia) Sultan Al-Anazi	(Saudi Arabia) Al-Qaisumah	End of loan	
30 June 2023	MF	54	(Saudi Arabia) Basil Al-Sayyali	(Saudi Arabia) Al-Hazem	End of loan	
30 June 2023	MF	–	(Saudi Arabia) Nawaf Al-Osaimi	(Saudi Arabia) Al-Arabi	End of loan	
30 June 2023	FW	18	(Saudi Arabia) Abdulfattah Adam	(Saudi Arabia) Abha	End of loan	
3 July 2023	MF	77	(Croatia) Marcelo Brozović	(Italy) Inter Milan	$19,600,000	
18 July 2023	MF	6	(Ivory Coast) Seko Fofana	(France) Lens	$28,000,000	
23 July 2023	DF	15	(Brazil) Alex Telles	(England) Manchester United	$7,800,000	
1 August 2023	FW	10	(Senegal) Sadio Mané	(Germany) Bayern Munich	$33,000,000	
22 August 2023	MF	25	(Portugal) Otávio	(Portugal) Porto	$65,000,000	
24 August 2023	DF	27	(Spain) Aymeric Laporte	(England) Manchester City	$29,800,000	
7 September 2023	GK	36	(Saudi Arabia) Raghed Al-Najjar	(Saudi Arabia) Al-Taawoun	Undisclosed	

=== Loans in ===
Start date	End date	Position	No.	Player	From club	Fee	Ref.
30 January 2024	End of season	DF	22	(Australia) Aziz Behich	(Australia) Melbourne City	$1,300,000	

=== Transfers out ===
Exit date	Position	No.	Player	To club	Fee	Ref.
30 June 2023	GK	22	(Argentina) Agustín Rossi	(Argentina) Boca Juniors	End of loan	
1 July 2023	GK	–	(Saudi Arabia) Abdulrahman Al-Shammari	(Saudi Arabia) Al-Arabi	Free	
1 July 2023	MF	54	(Saudi Arabia) Basil Al-Sayyali	(Saudi Arabia) Al-Hazem	Free	
20 July 2023	DF	21	(Spain) Álvaro González	(Saudi Arabia) Al-Qadsiah	Free	
20 July 2023	DF	86	(Saudi Arabia) Nawaf Al-Mutairi	(Saudi Arabia) Al-Orobah	Free	
21 July 2023	DF	28	(South Korea) Kim Jin-su	(South Korea) Jeonbuk Hyundai Motors	Free	
30 July 2023	MF	52	(Saudi Arabia) Khalil Al-Absi	(Saudi Arabia) Al-Hazem	Free	
1 August 2023	MF	–	(Saudi Arabia) Nawaf Al-Osaimi	(Saudi Arabia) Al-Ain	Free	
6 August 2023	GK	–	(Saudi Arabia) Raed Ozaybi	(Saudi Arabia) Al-Khaleej	Free	
17 August 2023	MF	77	(Uzbekistan) Jaloliddin Masharipov		Released	
24 August 2023	MF	10	(Argentina) Pity Martínez	(Argentina) River Plate	Free	
7 September 2023	FW	18	(Saudi Arabia) Abdulfattah Adam	(Saudi Arabia) Al-Taawoun	Undisclosed	
14 September 2023	FW	60	(Saudi Arabia) Faisal Majrashi	(Saudi Arabia) Al-Shaeib	Free	
30 January 2024	MF	11	(Saudi Arabia) Khalid Al-Ghannam	(Saudi Arabia) Al-Ettifaq	Undisclosed	

=== Loans out ===
Start date	End date	Position	No.	Player	To club	Fee	Ref.
1 July 2023	End of season	DF	20	(Saudi Arabia) Hamad Al Mansour	(Saudi Arabia) Al-Okhdood	None	
4 July 2023	End of season	GK	62	(Saudi Arabia) Abdulaziz Al-Awairdhi	(Saudi Arabia) Al-Okhdood	None	
6 August 2023	30 January 2024	DF	42	(Saudi Arabia) Mansour Al-Shammari	(Saudi Arabia) Al-Hazem	None	
30 August 2023	End of season	FW	56	(Saudi Arabia) Fahad Al-Zubaidi	(Saudi Arabia) Al-Orobah	None	
4 September 2023	End of season	DF	13	(Ivory Coast) Ghislain Konan	(Saudi Arabia) Al-Fayha	None	
7 September 2023	End of season	GK	1	(Saudi Arabia) Amin Bukhari	(Saudi Arabia) Al-Ettifaq	None	
7 September 2023	End of season	DF	59	(Saudi Arabia) Yousef Haqawi	(Saudi Arabia) Al-Fayha	None	
7 September 2023	End of season	DF	–	(Saudi Arabia) Majed Qasheesh	(Saudi Arabia) Al-Hazem	None	
7 September 2023	End of season	MF	21	(Saudi Arabia) Mukhtar Ali	(Saudi Arabia) Al-Fateh	None	
30 January 2024	End of season	DF	42	(Saudi Arabia) Mansour Al-Shammari	(Saudi Arabia) Al-Jabalain	None	
30 January 2024	End of season	DF	3	(Saudi Arabia) Abdullah Madu	(Saudi Arabia) Al-Ettifaq	None	
30 January 2024	End of season	MF	6	(Ivory Coast) Seko Fofana	(Saudi Arabia) Al-Ettifaq	None	
31 January 2024	End of season	DF	58	(Saudi Arabia) Aser Hawsawi	(Saudi Arabia) Jeddah	None	

== Pre-season and friendlies ==
10 July 2023 Friendly	Al-Nassr (Saudi Arabia)	2–0	(Portugal) Alverca	Albufeira, Portugal
20:30 WEST	Adam 9'; Talisca 59'	Report		Stadium: Estádio Municipal de Albufeira

14 July 2023 Friendly	Al-Nassr (Saudi Arabia)	5–1	(Portugal) Farense	Faro/Loulé, Portugal
20:30 WEST	Talisca 4', 23'; K. Al-Ghannam 74'; Adam 90+1'; Sahlouli 90+4'	Report	Matias 7'	Stadium: Estádio Algarve

17 July 2023 Algarve Cup	Celta Vigo (Spain)	5–0	(Saudi Arabia) Al-Nassr	Faro/Loulé, Portugal
20:30 WEST (UTC+01:00)	Alonso 57'; Larsen 61', 72', 74'; Rodríguez 70'; Tapia (yellow card) 89'	Report	Al-Amri (red card) 51'	Stadium: Estádio Algarve; Referee: António Nobre (Portugal)

20 July 2023 Algarve Cup	Al-Nassr (Saudi Arabia)	1–4	(Portugal) Benfica	Faro/Loulé, Portugal
20:30 WEST (UTC+01:00)	Al-Ghannam 42'	Report	Di María 23'; Ramos 31', 39'; Schjelderup 68'	Stadium: Estádio Algarve; Referee: Flávio Duarte

25 July 2023 Friendly	Al-Nassr (Saudi Arabia)	0–0	(France) Paris Saint-Germain	Osaka, Japan
19:20 JST		Report		Stadium: Nagai Stadium; Attendance: 14,500; Referee: Yudai Yamamoto (Japan)

27 July 2023 Friendly	Al-Nassr (Saudi Arabia)	1–1	(Italy) Inter Milan	Osaka, Japan
JST	Ghareeb 23'	Report	Frattesi 44'	Stadium: Nagai Stadium; Attendance: 12,000; Referee: Hiroyuki Kimura (Japan)

1 February 2024 2024 Riyadh Season Cup	Al-Nassr (Saudi Arabia)	6–0	(United States) Inter Miami	Riyadh, Saudi Arabia
21:00 SAST (UTC+3)	Otávio 3'; Talisca 10', 51' (pen.), 73'; Laporte 12'; Al-Amri (yellow card) 37'; Boushal (yellow card) 42'; Brozović (yellow card) 53'; Maran 68'	Report	Busquets (yellow card) 42'	Stadium: Kingdom Arena; Attendance: 25,000; Referee: Esther Staubli (Switzerland)

8 February 2024 2024 Riyadh Season Cup	Al-Hilal (Saudi Arabia)	2–0	(Saudi Arabia) Al-Nassr	Riyadh, Saudi Arabia
20:10 SAST (UTC+3)	Milinković-Savić 17'; Malcom (yellow card) 28'; S. Al-Dawsari 30'; Lodi (yellow card) 63'; Mitrović (yellow card) 90+2'	Report	Talisca (yellow card) 8'; Brozović (yellow card) 22'; Ronaldo (yellow card) 53'; Otávio (yellow card) 85'; Yahya (yellow card) 90+6'	Stadium: Kingdom Arena; Attendance: 26,000; Referee: Tori Penso (United States)

== Competitions ==
=== Overview ===
Competition	Record							
Competition	Pld	W	D	L	GF	GA	GD	Win %
Pro League	34	26	4	4	100	42	+58	76.47
King Cup	5	4	1	0	15	5	+10	80.00
Champions League	11	8	2	1	24	13	+11	72.73
Arab Club Champions Cup	6	4	2	0	11	4	+7	66.67
Super Cup	1	0	0	1	1	2	−1	0.00
Total	57	42	9	6	151	66	+85	73.68

Source: Competitions

=== Pro League ===
==== League table ====
Pos	Team	Pld	W	D	L	GF	GA	GD	Pts	Qualification or relegation
1	Al-Hilal (C)	34	31	3	0	101	23	+78	96	Qualification for AFC Champions League Elite league stage
2	Al-Nassr	34	26	4	4	100	42	+58	82	Qualification for AFC Champions League Elite league stage
3	Al-Ahli	34	19	8	7	67	35	+32	65	Qualification for AFC Champions League Elite league stage
4	Al-Taawoun	34	16	11	7	51	35	+16	59	Qualification for AFC Champions League Two group stage
5	Al-Ittihad	34	16	6	12	63	54	+9	54	

Source: SPL
Rules for classification: 1) Points; 2) Head-to-head points; 3) Head-to-head goal difference; 4) Total goal difference; 5) Total goals scored; 6) Fair-play points
(Note: Head-to-head record is used only after all the matches between the teams in question have been played).
(C) Champions

==== Results summary ====
Overall								Home						Away					
Pld	W	D	L	GF	GA	GD	Pts	W	D	L	GF	GA	GD	W	D	L	GF	GA	GD
34	26	4	4	100	42	+58	82	12	3	2	50	23	+27	14	1	2	50	19	+31

Source: spl.com.sa

==== Results by round ====
Round	1	2	3	4	5	6	7	8	9	10	11	12	13	14	15	16	17	18	19	20	21	22	23	24	25	26	27	28	29	30	31	32	33	34
Ground	A	H	A	H	A	A	H	A	H	H	A	H	A	H	A	H	A	H	A	H	A	H	H	A	H	A	A	H	A	H	A	H	A	H
Result	L	L	W	W	W	W	W	W	D	W	W	W	W	W	L	W	W	W	W	W	W	D	L	W	W	W	W	W	W	W	W	D	D	W
Position	12	15	10	6	6	6	5	4	3	3	2	2	2	2	2	2	2	2	2	2	2	2	2	2	2	2	2	2	2	2	2	2	2	2

Source: spl.com.sa
A = Away; H = Home; W = Win; D = Draw; L = Loss

==== Matches ====
All times are local, AST (UTC+3).

Win Draw Loss Postponed

14 August 2023 1	Al-Ettifaq	2–1	Al-Nassr	Dammam
21:00	Quaison 47'; Dembélé 53'	Report	Mané 4'	Stadium: Prince Mohamed bin Fahd Stadium; Attendance: 13,930; Referee: Mohammed Al-Hoaish

18 August 2023 2	Al-Nassr	0–2	Al-Taawoun	Riyadh
21:00	Al-Khaibari (yellow card) 22'; Talisca (yellow card) 53'	Report	Tawamba 20'; Al-Oyayari (yellow card) 45+6'; Al-Ahmed (yellow card) 61'; Bahusayn 90+6'	Stadium: Al-Awwal Park; Attendance: 20,096; Referee: Khaled Al-Teris

25 August 2023 3	Al-Fateh	0–5	Al-Nassr	Al-Hasa
21:00	Al-Hassan (yellow card) 63'	Report	Mané 27', 81'; Ronaldo 38', 55', 90+6'; Brozović (yellow card) 52'	Stadium: Prince Abdullah bin Jalawi Stadium; Attendance: 13,544; Referee: Abdullah Al-Harbi

29 August 2023 4	Al-Nassr	4–0	Al-Shabab	Riyadh
21:00	Ronaldo 13' (pen.), 38' (pen.); Mané 40', (yellow card) 43'; S. Al-Ghannam 80'; Boushal (yellow card) 89'	Report	Al-Sibyani (yellow card) 29'; Al-Sharari (yellow card) 33'; Cuéllar (yellow card) 37'; Santos (yellow card) 43'; Bahebri (yellow card) 77'; Banega (red card) 78'	Stadium: Al-Awwal Park; Attendance: 21,383; Referee: Ismail Elfath (United States)

2 September 2023 5	Al-Hazem	1–5	Al-Nassr	Buraidah
21:00	Badamosi 47'	Report	Ghareeb 33'; Al-Khaibari 45+8'; Otávio 57'; Ronaldo 68'; Mané 78'; Ali (yellow card) 90+1'	Stadium: King Abdullah Sport City Stadium; Attendance: 12,297; Referee: Darío Herrera (Argentina)

16 September 2023 6	Al-Raed	1–3	Al-Nassr	Buraidah
18:00	M. Al-Dossari (yellow card) 8'; Wohaishi (red card) 45+2'; Fouzair 89' (pen.)	Report	Al-Khaibari (yellow card) 44'; Mané 45+1'; Talisca 49'; Al-Hassan (yellow card) 59'; Ronaldo 78'; Telles (yellow card) 84'; Al-Amri (yellow card) 87'	Stadium: King Abdullah Sport City Stadium; Attendance: 19,710; Referee: Wilmar Roldán (Colombia)

22 September 2023 7	Al-Nassr	4–3	Al-Ahli	Riyadh
21:00	Ronaldo 4', 52'; Talisca 17', 45+6', (yellow card) 90+6'; Mané (yellow card) 34'	Report	Kessié 30'; Mahrez 50' (pen.); Al-Buraikan 87'; Balobaid (yellow card) 90+3'	Stadium: Al-Awwal Park; Attendance: 23,524; Referee: Anderson Daronco (Brazil)

29 September 2023 8	Al-Tai	1–2	Al-Nassr	Ha'il
18:00	Dugandžić (yellow card) 37'; Misidjan 79', (yellow card) 82'; Al-Harabi (yellow card) 86'; Roco (yellow card) 86'	Report	Talisca 32'; Al-Khaibari (yellow card) 59'; Ronaldo 87' (pen.); Mané (yellow card) 90+1'	Stadium: Prince Abdul Aziz bin Musa'ed Stadium; Attendance: 10,898; Referee: Matthew Conger (New Zealand)

6 October 2023 9	Al-Nassr	2–2	Abha	Riyadh
18:00	Otávio 3'; Talisca 28'; S. Al-Ghannam (red card) 90+7'	Report	Bguir 36' (pen.); Noguera (yellow card) 53'; Al-Qumayzi (yellow card) 73'; Al-Jumayah (yellow card) 81'; Al-Kunaydiri (yellow card) 84'; Toko Ekambi 90+2'	Stadium: Al-Awwal Park; Attendance: 21,197; Referee: Mario Escobar (Guatemala)

21 October 2023 10	Al-Nassr	2–1	Damac	Riyadh
18:00	Al-Khaibari (yellow card) 10'; Talisca 52'; Ronaldo 56'; Boushal (yellow card) 90+7'	Report	Nkoudou 45+2'; Hamed (yellow card) 50'; Ceesay (yellow card) 60'	Stadium: Al-Awwal Park; Attendance: 16,875; Referee: Saíd Martínez (Honduras)

28 October 2023 11	Al-Fayha	1–3	Al-Nassr	Riyadh
18:00	Ryller (yellow card) 20'; Al-Shuwaish 66'; Al-Safri (yellow card) 89'	Report	Talisca 50', 61'; Al-Amri (yellow card) 53'; Otávio 74'	Stadium: King Fahd International Stadium; Attendance: 5,400; Referee: Anastasios Sidiropoulos (Greece)

4 November 2023 12	Al-Nassr	2–0	Al-Khaleej	Riyadh
21:00	Ronaldo 26'; Laporte 58'; Ghareeb (yellow card) 79'	Report	Martins (yellow card) 19'; Al Hamsal (yellow card) 21'	Stadium: Al-Awwal Park; Attendance: 17,121; Referee: Guillermo Guerrero (Ecuador)

11 November 2023 13	Al-Wehda	1–3	Al-Nassr	Mecca
21:00	Bakshween (yellow card) 60'; Anselmo 81'	Report	Telles 11'; Al-Amri 39'; Ronaldo 49'	Stadium: King Abdul Aziz Stadium; Attendance: 10,727; Referee: Fernando Guerrero (Mexico)

24 November 2023 14	Al-Nassr	3–0	Al-Okhdood	Riyadh
21:00	Al-Najei 13'; Ronaldo 77', 80'	Report	Tănase (yellow card) 26'; Tawamba (yellow card) 34'; Al-Harthi (yellow card) 78'	Stadium: Al-Awwal Park; Attendance: 21,752; Referee: Faisal Al-Blwi

1 December 2023 15	Al-Hilal	3–0	Al-Nassr	Riyadh
21:00	Milinković-Savić 64'; Mitrović (yellow card) 69', (goal) 89', 90+2'; Koulibaly (yellow card) 79'; Al-Bulaihi (red card) 90+3'; Malcom (yellow card) 90+5'; Jahfali (yellow card) 90+10'	Report	Otávio (yellow card) 40'; Yahya (yellow card) 90+2'	Stadium: King Fahd International Stadium; Attendance: 50,561; Referee: Wilmar Roldán (Colombia)

8 December 2023 16	Al-Nassr	4–1	Al-Riyadh	Riyadh
21:00	Ronaldo 31'; Otávio 45+3'; Talisca 67', 90+4'; Yahya (yellow card) 88'	Report	Al-Shuwayyi (yellow card) 5'; Al-Rashidi (yellow card) 20'; Gray 68'	Stadium: Al-Awwal Park; Attendance: 17,047; Referee: Majed Al-Shamrani

22 December 2023 18	Al-Nassr	3–1	Al-Ettifaq	Riyadh
21:00	Telles 43'; Laporte (yellow card) 45+5'; Brozović 59'; Ronaldo 73' (pen.)	Report	Dembélé (yellow card) 36'; Tisserand (yellow card) 84'; Al-Kuwaykibi 85'	Stadium: Al-Awwal Park; Attendance: 23,774; Referee: Khaled Al-Teris

26 December 2023 17	Al-Ittihad	2–5	Al-Nassr	Jeddah
21:00	Hamdallah 14', 51', (yellow card) 47'; Al-Ghamdi (yellow card) 28'; Kanté (yellow card) 40'; Fabinho (yellow card) 60' (yellow-red card) 66'	Report	Ronaldo 19' (pen.), 68' (pen.); Fofana (yellow card) 30'; Talisca 38'; Telles (yellow card) 45+11'; Laporte (yellow card) 47'; Lajami (yellow card) 70'; Mané 75', 82'	Stadium: Prince Abdullah Al Faisal Stadium; Attendance: 20,332; Referee: Anastasios Sidiropoulos (Greece)

30 December 2023 19	Al-Taawoun	1–4	Al-Nassr	Buraidah
21:00	El Mahdioui 13'; Al-Oyayari (yellow card) 42'; Al-Saluli (yellow card) 44'	Report	Al-Amri (yellow card) 11'; Ronaldo (yellow card) 11', (goal) 90+2'; Brozović 26'; Laporte 35'; Otávio 50'; Al-Khaibari (yellow card) 77'	Stadium: King Abdullah Sport City Stadium; Attendance: 18,113; Referee: Mohammed Al-Hoaish

17 February 2024 20	Al-Nassr	2–1	Al-Fateh	Riyadh
20:00	Brozović (yellow card) 14'; Ronaldo 17'; Otávio 72'	Report	Al-Najdi 29', (yellow card) 30'; Batna (yellow card) 53'; Tello (yellow card) 78'; Saâdane (yellow card) 79'	Stadium: Al-Awwal Park; Attendance: 15,803; Referee: Sami Al-Jires

25 February 2024 21	Al-Shabab	2–3	Al-Nassr	Riyadh
20:00	Carrasco (yellow card) 26', (goal) 45+8' (pen.); Saïss (yellow card) 51'; Carlos 67'; Al-Sharari (yellow card) 88'; Radif (yellow card) 90+6' (yellow-red card) 90+12'	Report	Ronaldo 21' (pen.); Talisca 46', 86'; Boushal (yellow card) 90+6'	Stadium: Al-Shabab Club Stadium; Attendance: 11,974; Referee: Tamás Bognár (Hungary)

29 February 2024 22	Al-Nassr	4–4	Al-Hazem	Riyadh
20:00	Talisca 31' (pen.), 61', 71'; Mané 90+4' (pen.); Brozović (yellow card) 90+9'	Report	Badamosi (yellow card) 42'; Al Mohaimed 53', (yellow card) 88'; Tozé 66'; Selemani 84', (yellow card) 90+13'; Dahmen (yellow card) 90+3'; Ricardo 90+9'	Stadium: Al-Awwal Park; Attendance: 19,323; Referee: Shukri Al-Hanfoush

7 March 2024 23	Al-Nassr	1–3	Al-Raed	Riyadh
20:00	Yahya 24'	Report	El Berkaoui 18'; Fouzair 46', (yellow card) 61'; Al-Jayzani (yellow card) 67'; Moreira (yellow card) 85'; Sayoud 87'; R. Al-Ghamdi (yellow card) 90+1'; M. Al-Dossari (yellow card) 90+5'; Al-Rajeh (yellow card) 90+11'	Stadium: Al-Awwal Park; Attendance: 17,409; Referee: Abdullah Al-Kharboush

15 March 2024 24	Al-Ahli	0–1	Al-Nassr	Jeddah
22:00	Ibañez (yellow card) 12'; Kessié (yellow card) 45+4'	Report	Otávio (yellow card) 53'; Ronaldo 68' (pen.); Laporte (yellow card) 90+10'	Stadium: King Abdullah Sports City; Attendance: 52,037; Referee: Facundo Tello (Argentine)

30 March 2024 25	Al-Nassr	5–1	Al-Tai	Riyadh
22:00	Otávio 20'; Telles (yellow card) 43'; Ghareeb 45+7'; Brozović (yellow card) 62'; Ronaldo 64', 67', 87'; Lajami (yellow card) 73'; Al Fatil (yellow card) 90+3'	Report	Misidjan (yellow card) 14' (yellow-red card) 36', (goal) 22'	Stadium: Al-Awwal Park; Attendance: 12,427; Referee: Abdullah Al-Harbi

2 April 2024 26	Abha	0–8	Al-Nassr	Abha
22:00	Al-Zubaidi (yellow card) 14'; Krychowiak (yellow card) 29'	Report	Ronaldo 11', 21', 42'; Mané 33'; Al-Sulaiheem 44'; Ghareeb 51'; Al-Aliwa 63', 86'	Stadium: Prince Sultan bin Abdul Aziz Stadium; Attendance: 12,079; Referee: Ahmed Al-Rumaikhani

5 April 2024 27	Damac	0–1	Al-Nassr	Abha
22:00	Antolić (yellow card) 40'	Report	Qassem (yellow card) 41'; Lajami (yellow card) 69'; Laporte 90+1'	Stadium: Prince Sultan bin Abdul Aziz Stadium; Attendance: 14,065; Referee: Abdulsamad Bakri

19 April 2024 28	Al-Nassr	3–1	Al-Fayha	Riyadh
18:00	Mané (yellow card) 37', (goal) 76', 82'; Al-Amri 72'; Al-Khaibari (yellow card) 88'	Report	Sakala 6', (red card) 88'; Cimirot (yellow card) 28'; Sabiri (yellow card) 45+3'	Stadium: Al-Awwal Park; Attendance: 6,093; Referee: Mohammed Al-Harbi

27 April 2024 29	Al-Khaleej	0–1	Al-Nassr	Dammam
21:00	Masoud (yellow card) 67'	Report	Al-Amri (yellow card) 42'; Laporte 68'; Al Fatil (yellow card) 90+5'	Stadium: Prince Mohamed bin Fahd Stadium; Attendance: 17,300; Referee: Abdullah Al-Kharboush

4 May 2024 30	Al-Nassr	6–0	Al-Wehda	Riyadh
21:00	Ronaldo 5', 12', 52'; Otávio 18'; Mané 45'; Al Fatil 88'	Report	Anselmo (yellow card) 38'; Fajr (yellow card) 87'	Stadium: Al-Awwal Park; Attendance: 10,037; Referee: Sultan Al-Harbi

9 May 2024 31	Al-Okhdood	2–3	Al-Nassr	Najran
21:00	Al-Rubaie (yellow card) 23'; Al-Habib 60'; Godwin 70'; Collado (yellow card) 84'	Report	Brozović 7', 90+1'; Ronaldo 15', (yellow card) 81'; Yahya (yellow card) 76'	Stadium: Prince Hathloul bin Abdul Aziz Sports City; Attendance: 7,042; Referee: Faisal Al-Blwi

17 May 2024 32	Al-Nassr	1–1	Al-Hilal	Riyadh
21:00	Otávio 1'; Mané (yellow card) 41'; Brozović (yellow card) 65'; Laporte (yellow card) 68'; Al-Khaibari (yellow card) 87'	Report	Kanno (yellow card) 24'; Neves (yellow card) 36'; Milinković-Savić (yellow card) 63'; Mitrović 90+10' (pen.)	Stadium: Al-Awwal Park; Attendance: 20,368; Referee: José María Sánchez Martínez (Spain)

23 May 2024 33	Al-Riyadh	2–2	Al-Nassr	Riyadh
21:00	Gray 26'; Al-Aqel 45+1'; Al-Shuwayyi (yellow card) 50'; Ndong (yellow card) 85'	Report	Otávio 15'; Telles (yellow card) 45+10'; Laporte (red card) 63'; Al-Nemer 90+7'	Stadium: Prince Faisal bin Fahd Stadium; Attendance: 1,876; Referee: Khaled Al-Teris

27 May 2024 34	Al-Nassr	4–2	Al-Ittihad	Riyadh
21:00	Mané (yellow card) 3'; Ronaldo 45+3', 69'; Ghareeb 79' (pen.); Al-Amri (yellow card) 90+5'; Al-Nemer 90+5'	Report	Al-Menhali (yellow card) 50', (red card) 66'; Al-Shamrani 88'; Fabinho 90+2'	Stadium: Al-Awwal Park; Attendance: 18,736; Referee: Majed Al-Shamrani

=== King Cup ===
All times are local, AST (UTC+3).

25 September 2023 Round of 32	Ohod	1–5	Al-Nassr	Jeddah
21:00	Al-Khaibari (yellow card) 13'; Milesi (yellow card) 34'; Michalak 45+4'; Al-Ruwaili (yellow card) 47'	Report	Mané 16' (pen.); Talisca (yellow card) 32', (goal) 73'; Fofana 62'; Telles (yellow card) 66'; Yahya 81'; Al-Najei 86'	Stadium: Prince Abdullah Al-Faisal Stadium; Attendance: 5,713; Referee: Harald Lechner (Austria)

31 October 2023 Round of 16	Al-Nassr	1–0 (a.e.t.)	Al-Ettifaq	Riyadh
17:45	Ronaldo (yellow card) 13'; Talisca (red card) 45+11'; Mané 107'; Otávio (yellow card) 116'	Report	H. Al-Ghamdi (yellow card) 67'; Al-Shamrani (yellow card) 70'; Abdulrahman (yellow card) 77'; Hazazi (red card) 89'	Stadium: Al-Awwal Park; Attendance: 18,341; Referee: Piero Maza (Chile)

11 December 2023 Quarter-finals	Al-Shabab	2–5	Al-Nassr	Riyadh
21:00	Al-Muwallad (yellow card) 20'; Carlos 24'; Saïss (yellow card) 62'; Al-Qahtani (yellow card) 70'; Bahebri 90'	Report	Fofana 17'; Mané 28'; Ghareeb 45+4'; Ronaldo 74'; Maran 90+6'	Stadium: Al-Shabab Club Stadium; Attendance: 10,387; Referee: Iván Barton (El Salvador)

1 May 2024 Semi-finals	Al-Nassr	3–1	Al-Khaleej	Riyadh
21:00	Ronaldo 17', 57'; Brozović (yellow card) 30'; Mané 37' (pen.), (yellow card) 89'; Al-Khaibari (yellow card) 53'	Report	Al Haydar (yellow card) 70'; Al-Torais 82'	Stadium: Al-Awwal Park; Attendance: 17,859; Referee: Maurizio Mariani (Italy)

31 May 2024 Final	Al-Hilal	1–1 (a.e.t.) (5–4 p)	Al-Nassr	Jeddah
21:00 AST	Mitrović 7'; Lodi (yellow card) 22'; Koulibaly (yellow card) 28' (yellow-red card) 90'; Al-Faraj (yellow card) 33'; Michael (yellow card) 40'; Al-Bulaihi (yellow card) 87', (red card) 87'; Al-Shahrani (yellow card) 98'; Kanno (yellow card) 108'	Report	Otávio (yellow card) 26'; Al-Amri (yellow card) 45+1'; Ospina (red card) 56'; Yahya 88'; Telles (yellow card) 106'; Al-Ghannam (yellow card) 120+1'	Stadium: King Abdullah Sports City; Attendance: 56,870; Referee: Darío Herrera (Argentina)
	Penalties
	Neves (penalty missed); Mitrović (penalty scored); Kanno (penalty scored); Tambakti (penalty scored); Al-Hamdan (penalty scored); Abdulhamid (penalty missed); N. Al-Dawsari (penalty scored)		(penalty missed) Telles; (penalty scored) Ronaldo; (penalty scored) Al-Najei; (penalty scored) Ghareeb; (penalty scored) Lajami; (penalty missed) Al-Hassan; (penalty missed) Al-Nemer

=== Champions League ===
==== Play-off round ====
22 August 2023 Play-off round	Al-Nassr (Saudi Arabia)	4–2	(United Arab Emirates) Shabab Al-Ahli	Riyadh, Saudi Arabia
20:20 UTC+3	Talisca 11', 90+5'; S. Al-Ghannam 88'; Brozović 90+7'	Report	Al Ghassani 18', 46', (yellow card) 56'; Abdalla (yellow card) 45+2'; Naser (yellow card) 72'; Suleiman (yellow card) 90+2'	Stadium: Al-Awwal Park; Attendance: 20,600; Referee: Fu Ming (China)

==== Group stage ====
Pos	Team	Pld	W	D	L	GF	GA	GD	Pts	Qualification	NSR	PRS	DUH	IST
1	(Saudi Arabia) Al Nassr	6	4	2	0	13	7	+6	14	Advance to round of 16	—	0–0	4–3	3–1
2	(Iran) Persepolis	6	2	2	2	5	5	0	8		0–2	—	1–2	2–0
3	(Qatar) Al-Duhail	6	2	1	3	9	9	0	7		2–3	0–1	—	2–0
4	(Tajikistan) Istiklol	6	0	3	3	3	9	−6	3		1–1	1–1	0–0	—

Source: AFC
Rules for classification: Tiebreakers

19 September 2023 1	Persepolis (Iran)	0–2	(Saudi Arabia) Al-Nassr	Tehran, Iran
21:30 UTC+3:30	Sarlak (yellow card) 18' (yellow-red card) 52'; Rigi (yellow card) 55'	Report	Brozović (yellow card) 45+2'; Esmaeilifar 62' (o.g.); Qassem 72'	Stadium: Azadi Stadium; Attendance: 0 Referee: Ilgiz Tantashev (Uzbekistan)

2 October 2023 2	Al-Nassr (Saudi Arabia)	3–1	(Tajikistan) Istiklol	Riyadh, Saudi Arabia
21:00 UTC+3	Ronaldo 66'; Talisca 72', 77'	Report	Sebai 44'	Stadium: Al-Awwal Park; Attendance: 20,770; Referee: Ko Hyung-jin (South Korea)

24 October 2023 3	Al-Nassr (Saudi Arabia)	4–3	(Qatar) Al-Duhail	Riyadh, Saudi Arabia
21:00 UTC+3	Talisca 25'; Mané 56'; Ronaldo 61', 81'	Report	Mohammad 63'; Ali 67'; Olunga 85'; Musa (yellow card) 87'; Coutinho (yellow card) 87'	Stadium: Al-Awwal Park; Attendance: 20,752; Referee: Ahmed Al-Kaf (Oman)

7 November 2023 4	Al-Duhail (Qatar)	2–3	(Saudi Arabia) Al-Nassr	Doha, Qatar
21:00 UTC+3	Coutinho 8', 80' (pen.); Aymen (yellow card) 23'; Madibo (yellow card) 48'; Bamba (yellow card) 56'; Mohammed (red card) 90+2'	Report	Talisca 27', 37', 65', (yellow card) 87'; Brozović (yellow card) 79'	Stadium: Abdullah bin Khalifa Stadium; Attendance: 36,528; Referee: Ilgiz Tantashev (Uzbekistan)

27 November 2023 5	Al-Nassr (Saudi Arabia)	0–0	(Iran) Persepolis	Riyadh, Saudi Arabia
21:00 UTC+3	Lajami (red card) 17'; Brozović (yellow card) 59'	Report	Zahedi (yellow card) 43'; Alishah (yellow card) 44'; Rafiei (yellow card) 45+4'	Stadium: Al-Awwal Park; Attendance: 16,094; Referee: Ma Ning (China)

5 December 2023 6	Istiklol (Tajikistan)	1–1	(Saudi Arabia) Al-Nassr	Dushanbe, Tajikistan
21:00 UTC+5	Dzhalilov 32', (yellow card) 33'; Karomatullozoda (yellow card) 64'; Sebai (yellow card) 79'	Report	Qassem (yellow card) 45+5'; Al-Najei (yellow card) 47'; Ghareeb 50'; Otávio (yellow card) 90+4'	Stadium: Central Republican Stadium; Attendance: 17,715; Referee: Mohammed Abdulla Hassan Mohamed (United Arab Emirates)

==== Knockout stage ====
===== Round of 16 =====
14 February 2024 First leg	Al-Fayha (Saudi Arabia)	0–1	(Saudi Arabia) Al-Nassr	Riyadh, Saudi Arabia
21:00 UTC+3	Al-Shuwaish (yellow card) 77'; Sabiri (yellow card) 82'	Report	Al-Khaibari (yellow card) 37'; Ronaldo 81'; Al-Najjar (yellow card) 85'	Stadium: Prince Faisal bin Fahd Stadium; Attendance: 3,111; Referee: Salman Ahmad Falahi (Qatar)

21 February 2024 Second leg	Al-Nassr (Saudi Arabia)	2–0 (3–0 agg.)	(Saudi Arabia) Al-Fayha	Riyadh, Saudi Arabia
21:00 UTC+3	Otávio 17', (yellow card) 19'; Ronaldo (yellow card) 45+1', (goal) 86'; Al-Khaibari (yellow card) 79'	Report	Al-Safri (yellow card) 15'; Al-Harthi (yellow card) 36'; Onyekuru (yellow card) 45+4'; Al-Baqawi (yellow card) 54'; Al-Khalaf (yellow card) 58'	Stadium: Al-Awwal Park; Attendance: 22,783; Referee: Ma Ning (China)

===== Quarter-finals =====
4 March 2024 First leg	Al-Ain (United Arab Emirates)	1–0	(Saudi Arabia) Al-Nassr	Al Ain, United Arab Emirates
21:00 UTC+4	Al-Ahbabi (yellow card) 15'; Rahimi 44'; Kaku (yellow card) 45+6'; Eisa (yellow card) 82'; Abbas (yellow card) 83'; Al-Shamsi (yellow card) 90+11'	Report	Yahya (yellow card) 66'; Al-Nemer (yellow card) 76'; Laporte (red card) 90+4'; Al-Amri (yellow card) 90+15'	Stadium: Hazza bin Zayed Stadium; Attendance: 22,326; Referee: Hiroyuki Kimura (Japan)

11 March 2024 Second leg	Al-Nassr (Saudi Arabia)	4–3 (a.e.t.) (4–4 agg.) (1–3 p)	(United Arab Emirates) Al-Ain	Riyadh, Saudi Arabia
21:00 UTC+3	Ghareeb 45+5'; Brozovic (yellow card) 45+8'; Eisa 51' (o.g.); Mané (yellow card) 71'; Telles 72'; Otávio (yellow card) 84'; Yahya (red card) 98'; Al-Amri (yellow card) 100'; Ronaldo 118' (pen.)	Report	Rahimi 28', 45', (yellow card) 85'; Erik (yellow card) 32'; Abbas (yellow card) 38'; Al-Shamsi 103'; Juma (yellow card) 116'; Kaku (yellow card) 118'	Stadium: Al-Awwal Park; Attendance: 23,878; Referee: Ahmed Al-Kaf (Oman)
	Penalties
	Brozovic (penalty missed); Telles (penalty missed); Ronaldo (penalty scored); Otávio (penalty missed)		(penalty scored) Rahimi; (penalty scored) Kaku; (penalty scored) Al-Shamsi

=== Arab Club Champions Cup ===
==== Group stage ====
Pos	Team	Pld	W	D	L	GF	GA	GD	Pts	Qualification
1	(Saudi Arabia) Al-Shabab	3	2	1	0	2	0	+2	7	Advance to knockout stage
2	(Saudi Arabia) Al-Nassr	3	1	2	0	5	2	+3	5	Advance to knockout stage
3	(Egypt) Zamalek	3	1	1	1	5	2	+3	4	
4	(Tunisia) US Monastir	3	0	0	3	1	9	−8	0	

Source: UAFA
Rules for classification: Group stage tiebreakers

28 July 2023 1	Al-Nassr (Saudi Arabia)	0–0	(Saudi Arabia) Al-Shabab	Taif
22:00 UTC+3	Al-Hassan (yellow card) 43'; Talisca (yellow card) 46'	Report	Al-Jouei (yellow card) 2'; Abdu (yellow card) 60'; Santos (yellow card) 88'	Stadium: King Fahd Stadium; Referee: Lotfi Bekouassa (Algeria)

31 July 2023 2	Union Monastirienne (Tunisia)	1–4	(Saudi Arabia) Al-Nassr	Taif
22:00 UTC+3	Lajami 66' (o.g.)	Report	Talisca 42'; Ronaldo 74'; Al-Amri 88'; Al-Elewai 90'	Stadium: King Fahd Stadium; Referee: Abdulrahman Al-Jassim (Qatar)

3 August 2023 3	Zamalek (Egypt)	1–1	(Saudi Arabia) Al-Nassr	Taif
18:00 UTC+3	Mathlouthi (yellow card) 47'; Zizo 54' (pen.); Sobhy (yellow card) 75'	Report	Madu (yellow card) 38'; Telles (yellow card) 52'; Al-Amri (yellow card) 63'; Ronaldo 87'	Stadium: King Fahd Stadium; Referee: Rédouane Jiyed (Morocco)

==== Knockout phase ====
6 August 2023 Quarter-finals	Raja CA (Morocco)	1–3	(Saudi Arabia) Al-Nassr	Abha
18:00 UTC+3	Aholou (yellow card) 14'; Madu 41' (o.g.); El Wardi (yellow card) 59'	Report	Ronaldo 19'; S. Al-Ghannam 29'; Fofana 38'; Al-Khaibari (yellow card) 78'; Telles (yellow card) 79'	Stadium: Prince Sultan bin Abdul Aziz Stadium; Referee: Mahmoud El Banna (Egypt)

9 August 2023 Semi-finals	Al-Shorta (Iraq)	0–1	(Saudi Arabia) Al-Nassr	Abha
18:00 UTC+3		Report	Ronaldo 75' (pen.)	Stadium: Prince Sultan bin Abdul Aziz Stadium; Referee: Adel Al Naqbi (United Arab Emirates); Man of the Match: Cristiano Ronaldo

12 August 2023 Final	Al-Hilal (Saudi Arabia)	1–2 (a.e.t.)	(Saudi Arabia) Al-Nassr	Taif
18:00 UTC+3	Koulibaly (yellow card) 43'; Al-Bulaihi (yellow card) 44'; Michael 51'	Report	Brozović (yellow card) 32'; S. Al-Ghannam (yellow card) 44'; Mané (yellow card) 48'; Al-Amri (red card) 71'; Ronaldo 74', 97'; Konan (yellow card) 110'; Al-Sulaiheem (yellow card) 118'	Stadium: King Fahd Stadium; Referee: Redouane Jiyed (Morocco)

=== Super Cup ===
8 April 2024 Semi-finals	Al-Hilal	2–1	Al-Nassr	Abu Dhabi, United Arab Emirates
23:30 UTC+4	S. Al-Dawsari (yellow card) 28', (goal) 61'; Milinković-Savić (yellow card) 34'; Malcom 72'; Al-Bulaihi (yellow card) 86'	Report	Lajami (yellow card) 54'; Ronaldo (red card) 86'; Mané 90+9'	Stadium: Mohammed bin Zayed Stadium; Attendance: 34,000; Referee: Mohammed Al-Hoaish

== Statistics ==
=== Appearances ===
No.	Pos	Nat	Player	Total		Pro League		King Cup		Champions League		Arab Club Champions Cup		Super Cup	
No.	Pos	Nat	Player	Apps	Goals	Apps	Goals	Apps	Goals	Apps	Goals	Apps	Goals	Apps	Goals
Goalkeepers
26	GK	(Colombia) COL	David Ospina	15	0	11	0	2	0	1	0	0	0	1	0
33	GK	(Saudi Arabia) KSA	Waleed Abdullah	6	0	3+1	0	0+1	0	1	0	0	0	0	0
36	GK	(Saudi Arabia) KSA	Raghed Al-Najjar	7	0	4	0	0	0	3	0	0	0	0	0
37	GK	(Saudi Arabia) KSA	Fares Afandi	0	0	0	0	0	0	0	0	0	0	0	0
41	GK	(Saudi Arabia) KSA	Mohammed Al-Otaibi	0	0	0	0	0	0	0	0	0	0	0	0
44	GK	(Saudi Arabia) KSA	Nawaf Al-Aqidi	31	0	16	0	3	0	6	0	6	0	0	0
Defenders
2	DF	(Saudi Arabia) KSA	Sultan Al-Ghannam	40	3	22+1	1	3	0	8	1	5	1	1	0
4	DF	(Saudi Arabia) KSA	Mohammed Al-Fatil	26	1	12+5	1	0+1	0	4+1	0	0+2	0	1	0
5	DF	(Saudi Arabia) KSA	Abdulelah Al-Amri	35	3	13+5	2	4	0	7+1	0	2+3	1	0	0
12	DF	(Saudi Arabia) KSA	Nawaf Boushal	22	0	8+6	0	2+1	0	1+3	0	1	0	0	0
15	DF	(Brazil) BRA	Alex Telles	40	3	26+1	2	4	0	2	1	5+1	0	1	0
22	DF	(Australia) AUS	Aziz Behich	3	0	0	0	0	0	3	0	0	0	0	0
24	DF	(Saudi Arabia) KSA	Mohammed Qassem	11	1	2+4	0	0+1	0	4	1	0	0	0	0
27	DF	(Spain) ESP	Aymeric Laporte	39	4	27	4	4	0	7	0	0	0	1	0
49	DF	(Saudi Arabia) KSA	Awad Aman	2	0	0+2	0	0	0	0	0	0	0	0	0
55	DF	(Saudi Arabia) KSA	Abdulaziz Al-Faraj	1	0	0+1	0	0	0	0	0	0	0	0	0
66	DF	(Saudi Arabia) KSA	Waleed Ayash	0	0	0	0	0	0	0	0	0	0	0	0
69	DF	(Saudi Arabia) KSA	Marzouq Tambakti	0	0	0	0	0	0	0	0	0	0	0	0
78	DF	(Saudi Arabia) KSA	Ali Lajami	32	0	17+1	0	2+1	0	5	0	5	0	1	0
Midfielders
8	MF	(Saudi Arabia) KSA	Abdulmajeed Al-Sulayhem	29	1	4+12	1	0+2	0	4+3	0	1+3	0	0	0
14	MF	(Saudi Arabia) KSA	Sami Al-Najei	30	2	9+11	1	0+2	1	3+5	0	0	0	0	0
17	MF	(Saudi Arabia) KSA	Abdullah Al-Khaibari	46	1	22+4	1	3+2	0	9	0	4+1	0	1	0
19	MF	(Saudi Arabia) KSA	Ali Al-Hassan	33	0	4+15	0	0+2	0	0+7	0	1+4	0	0	0
23	MF	(Saudi Arabia) KSA	Ayman Yahya	31	3	8+9	1	3+2	2	4+5	0	0	0	0	0
25	MF	(Portugal) POR	Otávio	44	11	28+1	10	5	0	8+1	1	0	0	1	0
29	MF	(Saudi Arabia) KSA	Abdulrahman Ghareeb	45	7	15+12	4	2+2	1	6+1	2	2+4	0	0+1	0
31	MF	(Saudi Arabia) KSA	Mohammed Sahlouli	1	0	0+1	0	0	0	0	0	0	0	0	0
46	MF	(Saudi Arabia) KSA	Abdulaziz Al-Aliwa	17	3	2+7	2	0+1	0	0+2	0	2+3	1	0	0
77	MF	(Croatia) CRO	Marcelo Brozović	48	5	27+3	4	4	0	8	1	5	0	1	0
94	MF	(Brazil) BRA	Talisca	31	26	16+1	16	2	1	5+1	8	5+1	1	0	0
Forwards
7	FW	(Portugal) POR	Cristiano Ronaldo	51	50	30+1	35	4	3	9	6	5+1	6	1	0
10	FW	(Senegal) SEN	Sadio Mané	50	19	31+1	13	5	4	8	1	3+1	0	1	1
16	FW	(Saudi Arabia) KSA	Mohammed Maran	7	1	0+4	0	0+1	1	1+1	0	0	0	0	0
30	FW	(Saudi Arabia) KSA	Meshari Al-Nemer	15	2	1+8	2	0+2	0	0+4	0	0	0	0	0
Players sent out on loan this season
1	GK	(Saudi Arabia) KSA	Amin Bukhari	0	0	0	0	0	0	0	0	0	0	0	0
3	DF	(Saudi Arabia) KSA	Abdullah Madu	8	0	1	0	0	0	1+1	0	5	0	0	0
6	MF	(Ivory Coast) CIV	Seko Fofana	25	3	9+5	0	3	2	1+1	0	5+1	1	0	0
13	DF	(Ivory Coast) CIV	Ghislain Konan	12	0	5	0	0	0	1	0	1+5	0	0	0
21	MF	(Saudi Arabia) KSA	Mukhtar Ali	4	0	1+2	0	0	0	0+1	0	0	0	0	0
Player who made an appearance this season but have left the club
11	MF	(Saudi Arabia) KSA	Khalid Al-Ghannam	15	0	0+8	0	0+2	0	1+2	0	2	0	0	0
18	FW	(Saudi Arabia) KSA	Abdulfattah Adam	2	0	0+1	0	0	0	0	0	1	0	0	0

=== Goalscorers ===
Rank	No.	Pos.	Nat.	Player	Pro League	King Cup	Champions League	Arab Club Champions Cup	Super Cup	Total
1	7	FW	(Portugal)	Cristiano Ronaldo	35	3	6	6	0	50
2	94	MF	(Brazil)	Talisca	16	1	8	1	0	26
3	10	FW	(Senegal)	Sadio Mané	13	4	1	0	1	19
4	25	MF	(Portugal)	Otávio	10	0	1	0	0	11
5	29	MF	(Saudi Arabia)	Abdulrahman Ghareeb	4	1	2	0	0	7
6	77	MF	(Croatia)	Marcelo Brozović	4	0	1	0	0	5
7	27	DF	(Spain)	Aymeric Laporte	4	0	0	0	0	4
8	2	DF	(Saudi Arabia)	Sultan Al-Ghannam	1	0	1	1	0	3
8	5	DF	(Saudi Arabia)	Abdulelah Al-Amri	2	0	0	1	0	3
8	6	MF	(Ivory Coast)	Seko Fofana	0	2	0	1	0	3
8	15	DF	(Brazil)	Alex Telles	2	0	1	0	0	3
8	23	MF	(Saudi Arabia)	Ayman Yahya	1	2	0	0	0	3
8	46	MF	(Saudi Arabia)	Abdulaziz Al-Aliwa	2	0	0	1	0	3
14	14	MF	(Saudi Arabia)	Sami Al-Najei	1	1	0	0	0	2
14	30	FW	(Saudi Arabia)	Meshari Al-Nemer	2	0	0	0	0	2
16	4	DF	(Saudi Arabia)	Mohammed Al-Fatil	1	0	0	0	0	1
16	8	MF	(Saudi Arabia)	Abdulmajeed Al-Sulayhem	1	0	0	0	0	1
16	16	FW	(Saudi Arabia)	Mohammed Maran	0	1	0	0	0	1
16	17	MF	(Saudi Arabia)	Abdullah Al-Khaibari	1	0	0	0	0	1
16	24	DF	(Saudi Arabia)	Mohammed Qassem	0	0	1	0	0	1
Own goal					0	0	2	0	0	2
Total					100	15	24	11	1	151

Last Updated: 31 May 2024

=== Assists ===
Rank	No.	Pos.	Nat.	Player	Pro League	King Cup	Champions League	Arab Club Champions Cup	Super Cup	Total
1	7	FW	(Portugal)	Cristiano Ronaldo	11	0	2	0	0	13
2	29	MF	(Saudi Arabia)	Abdulrahman Ghareeb	6	0	4	1	1	12
3	2	DF	(Saudi Arabia)	Sultan Al-Ghannam	7	0	2	2	0	11
3	10	FW	(Senegal)	Sadio Mané	8	1	2	0	0	11
3	77	MF	(Croatia)	Marcelo Brozović	8	1	2	0	0	11
6	23	MF	(Saudi Arabia)	Ayman Yahya	1	3	3	0	0	7
6	25	MF	(Portugal)	Otávio	5	2	0	0	0	7
7	15	DF	(Brazil)	Alex Telles	4	1	0	1	0	6
7	94	MF	(Brazil)	Talisca	4	0	0	2	0	6
10	17	MF	(Saudi Arabia)	Abdullah Al-Khaibari	2	1	1	1	0	5
11	19	MF	(Saudi Arabia)	Ali Al-Hassan	3	0	0	0	0	3
12	8	MF	(Saudi Arabia)	Abdulmajeed Al-Sulayhem	2	0	0	0	0	2
13	4	DF	(Saudi Arabia)	Mohammed Al-Fatil	1	0	0	0	0	1
13	6	MF	(Ivory Coast)	Seko Fofana	1	0	0	0	0	1
13	11	MF	(Saudi Arabia)	Khalid Al-Ghannam	0	1	0	0	0	1
13	12	DF	(Saudi Arabia)	Nawaf Boushal	1	0	0	0	0	1
13	13	DF	(Ivory Coast)	Ghislain Konan	0	0	0	1	0	1
13	27	DF	(Spain)	Aymeric Laporte	1	0	0	0	0	1
13	46	MF	(Saudi Arabia)	Abdulaziz Al-Aliwa	1	0	0	0	0	1
13	78	DF	(Saudi Arabia)	Ali Lajami	0	1	0	0	0	1
Total					66	11	16	8	1	102

Last Updated: 31 May 2024

=== Clean sheets ===
Rank	No.	Pos.	Nat.	Player	Pro League	King Cup	Champions League	Arab Club Champions Cup	Super Cup	Total
1	44	GK	(Saudi Arabia)	Nawaf Al-Aqidi	3	1	2	2	0	8
2	26	GK	(Colombia)	David Ospina	5	0	0	0	0	5
3	36	GK	(Saudi Arabia)	Raghed Al-Najjar	1	0	1	0	0	2
4	33	GK	(Saudi Arabia)	Waleed Abdullah	0	0	1	0	0	1
Total					8	1	4	2	0	15

Last Updated: 4 May 2024
