= 2023 Arab Club Champions Cup final =

- Event: 2023 Arab Club Champions Cup
Al-Hilal	Al-Nassr
(Saudi Arabia)	(Saudi Arabia)
1	2
- After extra time
- Date: 12 August 2023
- Venue: King Fahd Stadium, Taif
- Man of the Match: Sergej Milinković-Savić (Al-Hilal)
- Referee: Redouane Jiyed (Morocco)
- Weather: Partly cloudy 33 °C (91 °F)

The 2023 Arab Club Champions Cup final was the final match of the 2023 Arab Club Champions Cup, the 30th season of the Arab League's main club football tournament organised by UAFA, and the 3rd season since it was renamed from the Arab Club Championship to the Arab Club Champions Cup. It was played at the King Fahd Stadium in Taif. Al-Nassr beat Al-Hilal 2–1 after extra time to earn their first Arab Club Champions Cup title.

== Teams ==
Team	Previous finals appearances (bold indicates winners)
(Saudi Arabia) Al-Hilal	4 (1989, **1994**, **1995**, 2018–19)
(Saudi Arabia) Al-Nassr	None

== Route to the final ==
Both clubs entered the Arab Club Champions Cup at the group stage of the competition with the draw made on 6 March 2023. Al-Hilal was drawn in group B while Al-Nassr was drawn in group C.

Al-Hilal		Round	Al-Nassr	
Opponent	Agg.		Opponent	Agg.
(Libya) Al Ahli Tripoli	0–0	Group stage	(Saudi Arabia) Al-Shabab	0–0
(Qatar) Al-Sadd	2–3	Group stage	(Tunisia) US Monastir	4–1
(Morocco) Wydad AC	2–1	Group stage	(Egypt) Zamalek	1–1
(Saudi Arabia) Al-Ittihad Jeddah	3–1	Quarter-finals	(Morocco) Raja CA	3–1
(Saudi Arabia) Al-Shabab	3–1	Semi-finals	(Iraq) Al-Shorta	1–0

== Match ==
=== Details ===
12 August 2023
18:00 AST (UTC+3)

Al-Hilal (Saudi Arabia)	1–2 (a.e.t.)	(Saudi Arabia) Al-Nassr
Michael 51'	Report	Ronaldo 74', 98'

King Fahd Stadium, Taif
Referee: Redouane Jiyed (Morocco)

**Al-Hilal**	**Al-Nassr**

GK	21	(Saudi Arabia) Mohammed Al-Owais
RB	66	(Saudi Arabia) Saud Abdulhamid
CB	3	(Senegal) Kalidou Koulibaly	(yellow card) 43'	(substituted off) 83'
CB	5	(Saudi Arabia) Ali Al-Bulaihi	(yellow card) 43'
LB	12	(Saudi Arabia) Yasser Al-Shahrani		(substituted off) 83'
DM	8	(Portugal) Rúben Neves		(substituted off) 105+1'
CM	28	(Saudi Arabia) Mohamed Kanno		(substituted off) 105+2'
CM	22	(Serbia) Sergej Milinković-Savić
RW	77	(Brazil) Malcom		(substituted off) 105+1'
LW	29	(Saudi Arabia) Salem Al-Dawsari (c)
CF	96	(Brazil) Michael		(substituted off) 90'
Substitutes:
GK	31	(Saudi Arabia) Habib Al-Wotayan
DF	2	(Saudi Arabia) Mohammed Al-Breik		(substituted on) 83'
DF	67	(Saudi Arabia) Mohammed Al-Khaibari
DF	70	(Saudi Arabia) Mohammed Jahfali		(substituted on) 83'
DF	88	(Saudi Arabia) Hamad Al-Yami
MF	16	(Saudi Arabia) Nasser Al-Dawsari
MF	19	(Peru) André Carrillo		(substituted on) 105+1'
MF	43	(Saudi Arabia) Musab Al-Juwayr		(substituted on) 105+2'
MF	44	(Saudi Arabia) Saad Al-Nasser
MF	56	(Saudi Arabia) Mohammed Al-Qahtani
FW	14	(Saudi Arabia) Abdullah Al-Hamdan		(substituted on) 90'
FW	49	(Saudi Arabia) Abdullah Radif		(substituted on) 105+1'
Manager:
(Portugal) Jorge Jesus

GK	44	(Saudi Arabia) Nawaf Al-Aqidi
RB	2	(Saudi Arabia) Sultan Al-Ghannam	(yellow card) 43'
CB	78	(Saudi Arabia) Ali Lajami		(substituted off) 79'
CB	5	(Saudi Arabia) Abdulelah Al-Amri	(red card) 71'
LB	15	(Brazil) Alex Telles
DM	77	(Croatia) Marcelo Brozović	(yellow card) 32'	(substituted off) 120+2'
DM	17	(Saudi Arabia) Abdullah Al-Khaibari		(substituted off) 80'
CM	6	(Ivory Coast) Seko Fofana
RF	94	(Brazil) Talisca		(substituted off) 90'
CF	7	(Portugal) Cristiano Ronaldo (c)		(substituted off) 115'
LF	10	(Senegal) Sadio Mané	(yellow card) 48'	(substituted off) 120'
Substitutes:
GK	1	(Saudi Arabia) Amin Bukhari
DF	4	(Saudi Arabia) Mohammed Al-Fatil		(substituted on) 79'
DF	12	(Saudi Arabia) Nawaf Boushal	(red card) 78'
DF	13	(Ivory Coast) Ghislain Konan	(yellow card) 110'	(substituted on) 80'
MF	8	(Saudi Arabia) Abdulmajeed Al-Sulaiheem	(yellow card) 118'	(substituted on) 120+2'
MF	11	(Saudi Arabia) Khalid Al-Ghannam
MF	14	(Saudi Arabia) Sami Al-Najei
MF	19	(Saudi Arabia) Ali Al-Hassan		(substituted on) 115'
MF	21	(Saudi Arabia) Mukhtar Ali
MF	29	(Saudi Arabia) Abdulrahman Ghareeb		(substituted on) 90'
MF	46	(Saudi Arabia) Abdulaziz Al-Elewai		(substituted on) 120'
FW	18	(Saudi Arabia) Abdulfattah Adam
Manager:
(Portugal) Luís Castro			(yellow card) 77' (red card) 102'

Assistant referees:
Lahcen Azgaou (Morocco)
Mustapha Akerkad (Morocco)
Fourth official:
Mahmoud El Banna (Egypt)
Video assistant referee:
Samir Guezzaz (Morocco)
Assistant video assistant referee:
Mokrane Gourari (Algeria)

**Match rules**

- 90 minutes
- 30 minutes of extra time if necessary.
- Penalty shoot-out if scores still level
- Twelve named substitutes
- Maximum of five substitutions, with a sixth allowed in extra time. (Note: Each team was given only three opportunities to make substitutions, with a fourth opportunity in extra time, excluding substitutions made at half-time, before the start of extra time and at half-time in extra time.)
