= Abdulfattah Adam =

Saudi Arabian footballer

Abdulfattah Adam عبدالفتاح آدم
Personal information
- Full name: Abdulfattah Mohammed Adam
- Date of birth: 1 January 1995 (age 31)
- Place of birth: Medina, Saudi Arabia
- Height: 1.80 m (5 ft 11 in)
- Position: Striker

Team information
- Current team: Al-Ula
- Number: 77

Senior career*
Years	Team	Apps	(Gls)
2014–2017	Al-Jeel		(51)
2017–2018	Al-Hazem	16	(8)
2018–2019	Al-Taawoun	33	(15)
2019–2023	Al-Nassr	14	(2)
2020–2021	→ Al-Raed (loan)	3	(1)
2022–2023	→ Abha (loan)	26	(4)
2023–2026	Al-Taawoun	62	(10)
2026–	Al-Ula	13	(4)

International career^{‡}
2018–	Saudi Arabia	4	(2)
- * Club domestic league appearances and goals as of 26 August 2026 ‡ National team caps and goals as of 10 August 2019

Abdulfattah Adam (Arabic: عبدالفتاح آدم, born 1 January 1995) is a Saudi Arabian professional footballer who plays as a striker for Al-Ula, and the Saudi Arabia national team.

== Club career ==
Adam was first scouted when he played in a friendly match against Al-Jeel during the summer of 2014. Al-Jeel were impressed by him and Abdullah Darwish, the manager at the time, insisted on Adam participating in the team's training. Adam officially signed for Al-Jeel during the 2014 summer transfer window.

=== Al-Jeel ===
Abdulfattah ended his first season with Al-Jeel scoring 10 goals during the course of the 2014–15 season helping them to a sixth-placed finish. During his second season with the club, Adam ended the season with 21 goals in all competitions. He finished as the league's top scorer for the first time in his career. During his last season, the 2016–17 season, Abdulfattah Adam finished the season with 21 goals in 31 appearances in all competitions. He also finished the season as the league's top scorer for the second consecutive season. In the 2016–17 season Adam became the all-time leading goal scorer for Al-Jeel with his 50th goal for the club.

=== Al-Hazem ===
On May 18, 2017, Abdulfattah Adam left Al-Jeel and joined Al-Hazem on a free transfer. Adam started the season poorly and scored just once in his first eight games. However, his form soon began to improve scoring 7 goals in 8 appearances. He left the club during the 2018 winter transfer window and ended his time with Al-Hazem with 17 appearances and 8 goals.

=== Al-Taawoun ===
On January 28, 2018, Adam signed for Pro League side Al-Taawoun. He made his debut on 3 February, coming on as a substitute against Al-Faisaly. He made his first start for the club on March 5 against Al-Ittihad. He scored a brace and assisted once to help his team record a historic 5–2 win. He scored his third goal for the club on the final matchday in a 3–2 loss against Al-Ettifaq. Adam ended his first season at Al-Taawoun with 8 appearances and scored 3 goals.

He made his first appearance of the second season at the club by starting the league match against former club Al-Hazem. The match ended in a 1–1 draw. In his second match, Adam came off the bench against Al-Ittihad and scored the 5th goal in a 5–3 win. During a 4–0 win over Ohod, Adam scored his first hat trick in the Pro League on 14 February 2019. Adam started the King Cup semi-final match against Al-Hilal and scored the second goal in a 5–0 away win. Adam was an unused substitute as Al-Taawoun defeated Al-Ittihad 2–1 to win the 2019 King Cup. He ended his second season making 30 appearances and scoring 15 goals throughout all competitions.

=== Al-Nassr ===
On 13 July 2019, Adam joined Al-Nassr for a reported fee of SAR25 million. He signed a five-year contract with the club. Adam struggled with injuries during his first season at the club. He failed to make the matchday squad for the first four months of the season. On 6 December 2019, Adam finally made his debut for Al-Nassr in the King Cup Round of 32 win against Al-Bukiryah. He came off the bench in the 62nd minute, to replace Abdulrahman Al-Dawsari, and assisted Nordin Amrabat's goal and Al-Nassr's fourth. On 13 December 2019, Adam made his league debut as well as score his first goal for Al-Nassr in the 2–1 win against former club Al-Taawoun. On 4 January 2020, Adam came off the bench in the 2019 Saudi Super Cup match against Al-Taawoun and scored his penalty in the shootout as Al-Nassr won the competition for the first time. On 15 September 2020, Adam made his continental debut for Al-Nassr, coming off the bench in the group stage match against Iranian side Sepahan. Adam ended his first season at Al-Nassr making 13 appearances in all competitions, scoring twice and assisting three times.

On 18 October 2020, Adam made started Al-Nassr's first league match of the season against Al-Fateh. He made one further appearance against Al-Taawoun before joining Al-Raed on loan.

On 25 October 2020, Adam joined Al-Raed on loan until the end of the 2020–21 season. On 5 November 2020, Adam made his debut for Al-Raed coming off the bench against Al-Wehda and scoring a stoppage-time winner. On 1 December 2020, Al-Raed announced that Adam had suffered an ACL injury and would undergo surgery, thus ending his season prematurely. He made just three appearances for Al-Raed and scored once.

Adam returned to Al-Nassr following the conclusion of his loan and made his first appearance since coming back on 18 September 2021 in the 3–1 loss against Al-Ittihad. On 22 December 2021, Adam made his first start of the season in the Round of 16 King Cup match against Al-Ettifaq. Adam also struggled with injuries throughout the season and made just five appearances in all competitions.

On 18 August 2022, Adam joined Abha on loan.

=== Al-Taawoun return ===
On 7 September 2023, Adam joined Al-Taawoun on a three-year deal.

=== Al-Ula ===
On 26 January 2026, Adam joined Al-Ula.

== Career statistics ==
=== Club ===
As of 17 January 2025

Club	Season	League			Cup (Note: Discontinued in September 19, 2017)		Kings Cup		Asia		Other		Total	
Club	Season	Division	Apps	Goals	Apps	Goals	Apps	Goals	Apps	Goals	Apps	Goals	Apps	Goals
Al-Jeel	2014–15	First Division	?	11	0	0	0	0	–	–	–	–	?	11
Al-Jeel	2015–16	First Division	28	20	1	1	2	0	–	–	–	–	31	21
Al-Jeel	2016–17	First Division	29	20	1	1	1	0	–	–	–	–	31	21
Al-Jeel Total			?	51	2	2	3	0	–	–	–	–	?	53
Al-Hazem	2017–18	MS League	16	8	–	–	1	0	–	–	–	–	17	8
Al-Taawoun	2017–18	SPL	8	3	–	–	0	0	–	–	–	–	8	3
Al-Taawoun	2018–19	SPL	25	12	–	–	5	3	–	–	–	–	30	15
Al-Taawoun Total			33	15	–	–	5	3	–	–	–	–	38	18
Al-Nassr	2019–20	SPL	7	2	–	–	1	0	4	0	1 (Note: Appearance in Saudi Super Cup)	0	13	2
Al-Nassr	2020–21	SPL	2	0	–	–	0	0	0	0	0	0	2	0
Al-Nassr	2021–22	SPL	4	0	–	–	1	0	0	0	0	0	5	0
Al-Nassr	2023–24	SPL	1	0	–	–	0	0	0	0	1	0	2	0
Al-Nassr Total			14	2	–	–	2	0	4	0	2	0	22	2
Al-Raed (loan)	2020–21	SPL	3	1	–	–	0	0	–	–	–	–	3	1
Abha (loan)	2022–23	SPL	26	4	2	3	0	0	–	–	–	–	28	7
Al-Taawoun	2023–24	SPL	21	6	3	1	0	0	–	–	–	–	24	7
Al-Taawoun	2024–25	SPL	12	3	1	0	0	0	4	1	–	–	17	4
Career Total			?	90	7	6	11	3	8	1	1	0	?	100

=== International ===
Statistics accurate as of match played 10 August 2019.

Team	Year	Apps	Goals
Saudi Arabia
Saudi Arabia	2018	1	0
Saudi Arabia	2019	3	2
Saudi Arabia	Total	4	2

=== International goals ===
Scores and results list Saudi Arabia's goal tally first.

No.	Date	Venue	Opponent	Score	Result	Competition
1.	21 March 2019	Al Nahyan Stadium, Abu Dhabi, United Arab Emirates	United Arab Emirates	1–0	1–2	Friendly
2.	25 March 2019	King Fahd International Stadium, Riyadh, Saudi Arabia	Equatorial Guinea	2–0	3–2	Friendly

== Honours ==
=== Club ===
Al-Taawoun

- King Cup: 2019

Al-Nassr

- Saudi Super Cup: 2019
- Arab Club Champions Cup: 2023

=== Individual ===
- Saudi First Division Golden Boot : 2015–16, 2016–17
