= Marcelo Brozović =

Croatian footballer (born 1992)

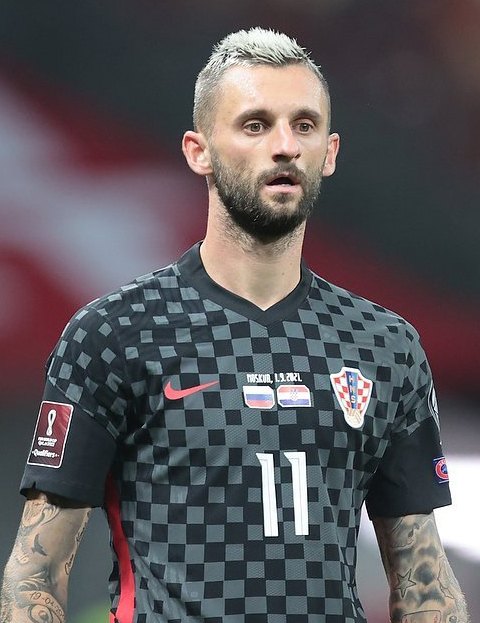
- Brozović with Croatia in 2021

Personal information
- Full name: Marcelo Brozović
- Date of birth: 16 November 1992 (age 34)
- Place of birth: Zagreb, Croatia
- Height: 1.81 m (5 ft 11 in)
- Position: Defensive midfielder

Team information
- Current team: Al-Saad
- Number: 77

Youth career
- 2002–2010: Hrvatski Dragovoljac

Senior career*
Years	Team	Apps	(Gls)
2010–2011	Hrvatski Dragovoljac	22	(1)
2011–2012	Lokomotiva	33	(5)
2012–2015	Dinamo Zagreb	64	(9)
2015–2023	Inter Milan	261	(25)
2023–2026	Al-Nassr	87	(6)
2026–	Al-Sadd	0	(0)

International career
2009–2010	Croatia U18	4	(0)
2011	Croatia U19	1	(0)
2011–2013	Croatia U20	5	(3)
2011–2014	Croatia U21	13	(7)
2014–2024	Croatia	99	(7)
Medal record
Men's football
Representing Croatia
FIFA World Cup
Runner-up	2018 Russia
Third place	2022 Qatar
UEFA Nations League
Runner-up	2023 Netherlands
- * Club domestic league appearances and goals as of 00:33, 14 September 2026 (UTC)

Marcelo Brozović (Croatian pronunciation: [martsělo brǒːzoʋitɕ]; born 16 November 1992) is a Croatian professional footballer who plays as a defensive midfielder for Qatari club Al Sadd.

After coming up through Hrvatski Dragovoljac's youth ranks, Brozović appeared in 22 games for his boyhood club in 2011, a season which saw the side relegated. Following the relegation, Brozović signed with Lokomotiva, where he spent one season, leading the club to a mid-table finish. In August 2012, Brozović moved to a new Zagreb club, this time to Dinamo Zagreb, where he spent three seasons as key contributor, before he was sent out on loan in January 2015 to Inter Milan. After spending 1 1/2 years on loan with the club, Inter Milan signed Brozović permanently for €5 million. Brozović spent seven seasons with Inter, making over 300 appearances with the club, and helping lead them to their first Serie A title in over a decade in 2021, as well as two European finals (Europa League in 2020 and Champions League in 2023). In the summer of 2023, Brozović moved to the Saudi Pro League, signing with Al-Nassr for a fee of €18 million.

Brozović made his international debut for Croatia in June 2014. He represented the nation at the 2014, 2018 and 2022 FIFA World Cups, as well as the 2016, 2020 and 2024 UEFA European Championships, reaching the 2018 FIFA World Cup and 2023 UEFA Nations League finals.

== Club career ==
=== Early career ===
Brozović was born in Zagreb, and graduated from neighbouring Hrvatski Dragovoljac's youth setup. He made his debut as a professional on 24 July 2010, starting and playing the full 90 minutes in a 1–4 loss against Dinamo Zagreb. Brozović scored his first goal on 18 March of the following year, the winner against Karlovac.

=== Lokomotiva ===
In July 2011, he signed with Lokomotiva, after Dragovoljac's relegation. He appeared in 27 league matches in his first campaign, scoring four times as Lokomotiva achieved a comfortable mid-table position.

=== Dinamo Zagreb ===
In August 2012, Brozović signed a seven-year contract with Dinamo Zagreb, as a replacement for Hamburger SV-bound Milan Badelj. He was given squad number 77, and made his competitive debut on 14 September in the goalless draw against NK Osijek at home, appearing as a second-half substitute. Four days later, Brozović made his UEFA Champions League debut by playing full-90 minutes in a 0–2 home defeat to Porto in the matchday 1 of group stage.

He had to wait until 14 April of the following year to score his first Dinamo Zagreb goal, as he netted the second of the 2–0 home win over Inter Zaprešić. Brozović finished his first season with the club by making 30 appearances in all competitions, including 23 in league, scoring twice in the process, as Dinamo Zagreb won league, reached second round of the 2012–13 Croatian Football Cup, and was eliminated in the group stage of the Champions League.

=== Inter Milan ===
On 24 January 2015, Brozović signed with Inter Milan on a one-and-a-half year-loan deal, with a conditional obligation for Inter to buy. He became the 900th player to wear the Nerazzurri shirt. Brozović took his preferred shirt number 77, last worn at Inter by Sulley Muntari. He made his official debut with the club on 1 February 2015, coming on as a substitute in the 3–1 away upset of Inter against Sassuolo. He scored his first Inter goal in final day in a 4–3 win over Empoli, helping Inter to end the season with a win. Brozović finished his first Inter season with 15 league appearances, 13 of them as a starter and one goal.

Brozović begun his first full-season at Inter by starting in the 2015–16 Serie A opening match against Atalanta at home. He scored his first league goal of the season on 23 November during the match against Frosinone at home, coming off the bench in 88th minute and netting the fourth goal of the match four minutes later, helping Inter to record its biggest win of the season. On 12 December, Brozović scored his second league goal, a screamer, and the last goal of the 4–0 away win against Udinese, celebrating the goal with his teammates with "EpicBrozo" signature in the process. Three days later, in the 2015–16 Coppa Italia's round of 16 match against Cagliari, Brozović scored the same identical goal he scored against Udinese, helping Inter to progress in the quarter-final with a 3–0 win. On 7 February of the following year, he assisted Jeison Murillo's goal from a corner kick in the match against Hellas Verona, which finished in a 3–3 away draw. Two week later, Brozović supplied his second assist to Mauro Icardi who scored the third goal of the 3–1 home win against Sampdoria.

On 2 March, in the returning leg of Coppa Italia's semi-final against Juventus at San Siro, Brozović scored a brace, including one with penalty kick, to help Inter overturn the 3–0 defeat and equal the aggregate 3–3, which led the match into the penalty shootouts; he scored his penalty shootout attempt, but Inter lost 3–5 and eventually was eliminated from the competition.

Brozović started the new season by playing the last 20 minutes of the 2–0 defeat at Chievo Verona, picking up a yellow card in the 79th minute. On 15 September, during the first match of 2016–17 UEFA Europa League group stage against Hapoel Be'er Sheva, Brozović played as a starter before was substituted in the beginning of the second half; he refused to stay in the bench which created controversies at Inter. This led the coach Frank de Boer to omit him for the league match against Juventus for "unprofessional behaviour". Speaking about the issue, De Boer stated that Brozović "has to demonstrate his discipline", adding that "he did something I couldn't accept".

He was finally called back on 20 October for the league match against Cagliari, finished in a 1–2 home defeat, remaining as an unused substitute. Four days later, he made his on-field debut in the matchday 3 of 2016–17 UEFA Europa League group stage against Southampton, but was sent off in the 77th minute after receiving a second yellow card.

Brozović improved his game with the new coach Stefano Pioli, scoring his first goal of the season on 24 November in the 3–2 away defeat to Hapoel Be'er Sheva, despite being 2–0 up in the first half, which confirmed the elimination of Inter from Europa League. That was followed by his first league goal four days later, scoring inside two minutes with a right shoot from edge the box, helping Inter past Fiorentina 4–2 at San Siro. On 7 December, Brozović extended his contract with Inter Milan until 2021, with the new deal including a significant wage rise. Four days later, he scored a double helping Inter to beat Genoa 2–0.

He scored his first goals of the 2017–18 season on 2 October in the 2–1 home at newly promoted side Benevento. Later on 11 February of the following year, during the league match versus Bologna, Brozović was replaced in 58th minute after a poor performance; while making his way out of the field, he was booed by some sections of the crowd, and he responded by sarcastically clapping back. He was fined by the club for the incident, and was left on bench for the following match versus Genoa, entering on the field only in the final minutes. Later on throughout the season, Brozović returned to his best form, cementing his place in the starting and becoming a fan favourite again. He made his 100th Serie A appearance on 12 May in the 1–2 upset loss to Sassuolo. In the final match of the season, against Lazio, his delivery in the first half resulted in a Danilo D'Ambrosio goal, while his cross from a corner kick in the second half was finished by a Matías Vecino header as Inter won 3–2 to secure a place in the UEFA Champions League group stage for the 2018–19 season. Individually, he scored four goals and provided nine assists, eight of them in the second part of the season, in 31 league appearances. In the 2018–19 season, Brozović made his first UEFA Champions League appearance for Inter on 18 September in the opening Group B match in a 2–1 comeback win versus Tottenham Hotspur. He netted his first goal of the campaign four days later, a 94th-minute winner over Sampdoria in round 5 of Serie A.

On 26 August 2019, he scored Inter's first goal of the season in a 4–0 victory over Lecce. On 21 September he scored the opener in a 2–0 victory over Milan in Derby della Madonnina. On 9 February 2020, Brozović captained Inter in another Derby della Madonnina and scored in the 4–2 victory. On 17 August, in a Europa League semi-final, he provided Danilo D'Ambrosio with an assist for the second goal in a 5–0 victory over Shakhtar Donetsk at Merkur Spiel-Arena. Four days later, he was named in the starting XI for the final against Sevilla, providing Diego Godín with an assist for Inter's second goal. Nevertheless, Sevilla won the trophy after a 3–2 victory over the Nerrazzuri.

On 2 May 2021, four matchdays before the end of the season, Sassuolo drew 1–1 with Atalanta at home, meaning that Inter mathematically secured the Serie A title. It was Inter's first league title since 2009–10 season, ending Juventus' nine-season-long league-winning streak. The title was also Brozović's first trophy with the Nerrazzuri. He finished the season with two goals and seven assists over all competitions. On 27 August 2021, in a 3–1 league victory over Hellas Verona, Brozović made his 200th Serie A appearance, becoming the first Croatian to achieve that in the three-points-for-a-win era.

On 10 June 2023, Brozović captained Inter in the 2023 UEFA Champions League final, becoming the first Croatian to captain a team in a Champions League final. Inter, however, lost the game 1–0 to Manchester City, interrupting the streak of Croatian players winning the Champions League that went back to 2013.

=== Al-Nassr ===
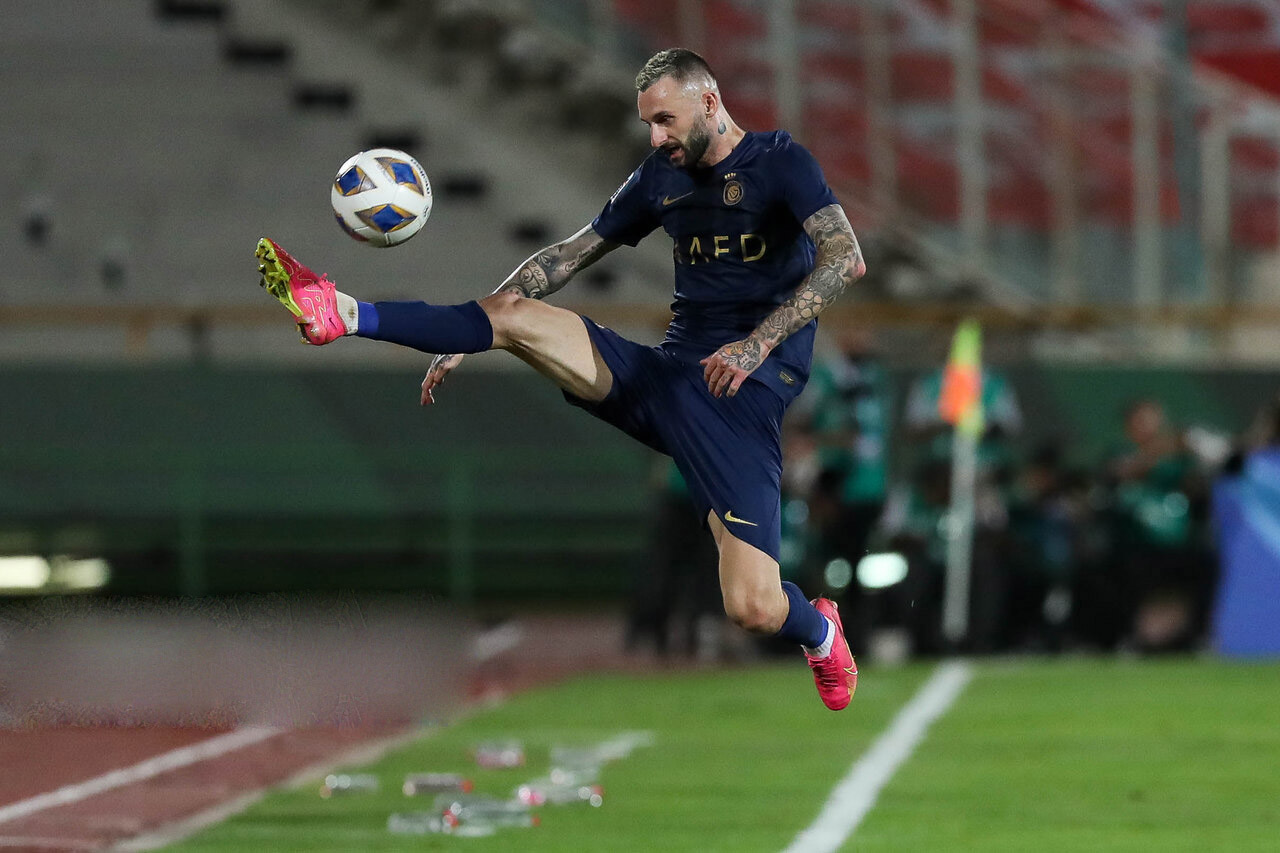
Brozović playing for Al Nassr against Persepolis in September 2023

On 3 July 2023, Saudi Pro League club Al-Nassr confirmed that they had secured Brozović for a transfer fee of €18m. Later that month, on 31 July, he made his debut for the club in a 4–1 win against US Monastir in the 2023 Arab Club Champions Cup. The competition was won by his club with a 2–1 victory over Al Hilal after extra time in the final on 12 August. Later that month, on 22 August, he scored his first goal in the stoppage time of a 4–2 victory over Shabab Al Ahli during the AFC Champions League qualifying play-offs. He won his second title with the club by helping them secure the 2025–26 Saudi Pro League title before leaving the club at the end of the season.

=== Al Sadd ===
On 13 September 2026, he joined Qatari club Al Sadd.

== International career ==
Brozović debuted for Croatia U21 in a 4–0 loss against Switzerland in September 2011, forming a midfield partnership with Mateo Kovačić.

=== Early senior career ===
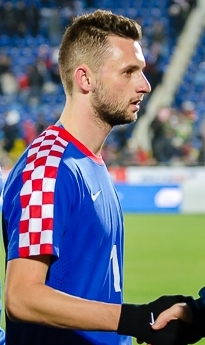
Brozović with Croatia in 2015

On 31 May 2014, Brozović was included in Niko Kovač's final list for 2014 FIFA World Cup, and made his senior squad debut on 7 June, starting in a 1–0 victory against Australia at the Estádio de Pituaçu. Brozović made his World Cup debut five days later, playing the last 26 minutes in a 1–3 loss against Brazil. Since the 2014 FIFA World Cup, Brozović has become a regular starter in Croatia's UEFA Euro 2016 qualifying, playing alongside Luka Modrić and Ivan Rakitić as part of a rotating midfield triangle for Croatia. Later that October, Brozović scored his first goal for Croatia in a 6–0 home victory against Azerbaijan. His second goal of the Euro 2016 qualifiers came in March 2015 against Norway, when he gave his team a 1–0 lead with a low curving shot from 20 meters into the bottom right corner.

In May 2016, Brozović was part of Croatia squad for the UEFA Euro 2016. He made his first UEFA European Championship appearance in Croatia's first match of Group D against Turkey, playing full 90 minutes as the team won 1–0. He later netted a brace for Croatia on 12 November 2016 in a World Cup qualifier against Iceland.

In May 2018, Brozović was named in Croatia's preliminary 32-man squad for the 2018 FIFA World Cup in Russia. He was included in the final squad as Croatia progressed all the way to the final against France. Brozović was a mainstay in the starting lineup, and he went the full 90 as Croatia lost 4–2.

=== Later international career and retirement ===
In May 2021, Brozović was called up for the postponed UEFA Euro 2020. In November 2022, he was selected in the 26-man squad for the 2022 FIFA World Cup in Qatar. Croatia managed to win the bronze medal in the latter, after a 2–1 victory against Morocco in the third place play-off.

On 7 June 2024, he was named in the 26-man squad for the UEFA Euro 2024. Two months later, on 14 August, he announced his retirement from international football, having earned 99 caps for his country.

== Style of play ==
He usually plays as a deep-lying playmaker or box-to-box midfielder, but is a midfielder.

== Personal life ==
Brozović married Silvija Lihtar in 2016; their daughter, Aurora, was born one year later. In October 2019 they had their second child, a son called Rafael.

In summer 2018, Brozović donated sets of textbooks to all primary school students for the forthcoming school year in Cerić, Croatia. In June 2020, he paid for a hip surgery for a Macedonian woman whom he had never met before.

== Career statistics ==
=== Club ===
As of match played 12 May 2026

Appearances and goals by club, season and competition
Club	Season	League			National cup (Note: Includes Croatian Cup, Coppa Italia, King's Cup)		Continental		Other		Total	
Club	Season	Division	Apps	Goals	Apps	Goals	Apps	Goals	Apps	Goals	Apps	Goals
Hrvatski Dragovoljac	2010–11	Prva HNL	22	1	1	0	—		—		23	1
Lokomotiva	2011–12	Prva HNL	27	4	—		—		—		27	4
Lokomotiva	2012–13	Prva HNL	6	1	1	1	—		—		7	2
Lokomotiva	Total		33	5	1	1	—		—		34	6
Dinamo Zagreb	2012–13	Prva HNL	23	2	1	0	6 (Note: Appearances in UEFA Champions League)	0	—		30	2
Dinamo Zagreb	2013–14	Prva HNL	27	6	6	1	8 (Note: Two appearances and one goal in UEFA Champions League, six appearances in UEFA Europa League)	1	1 (Note: Appearance in Croatian Super Cup)	0	42	8
Dinamo Zagreb	2014–15	Prva HNL	14	1	0	0	12 (Note: Four appearances and one goal in UEFA Champions League, eight appearances and one goal in UEFA Europa League)	2	1	0	27	3
Dinamo Zagreb	Total		64	9	7	1	26	3	2	0	99	13
Inter Milan (loan)	2014–15	Serie A	15	1	1	0	—		—		16	1
Inter Milan (loan)	2015–16	Serie A	32	4	3	3	—		—		35	7
Inter Milan	2016–17	Serie A	23	4	2	1	3 (Note: Appearances in UEFA Europa League)	1	—		28	6
Inter Milan	2017–18	Serie A	31	4	2	0	—		—		33	4
Inter Milan	2018–19	Serie A	32	2	2	0	8	0	—		42	2
Inter Milan	2019–20	Serie A	32	3	3	0	11 (Note: Six appearances in UEFA Champions League, five appearances in UEFA Europa League)	0	—		46	3
Inter Milan	2020–21	Serie A	33	2	4	0	5	0	—		42	2
Inter Milan	2021–22	Serie A	35	2	4	0	8	1	1 (Note: Appearance in Supercoppa Italiana)	0	48	3
Inter Milan	2022–23	Serie A	28	3	3	0	9	0	0	0	40	3
Inter Milan	Total		261	25	24	4	44	2	1	0	330	31
Al-Nassr	2023–24	Saudi Pro League	30	4	4	0	8 (Note: Appearances in AFC Champions League)	1	6 (Note: Five appearances in Arab Club Champions Cup, one appearance in Saudi Super Cup)	0	48	5
Al-Nassr	2024–25	Saudi Pro League	28	2	1	0	11	0	1 (Note: Appearance(s) in Saudi Super Cup)	0	41	2
Al-Nassr	2025–26	Saudi Pro League	29	0	1	0	8 (Note: Appearances in AFC Champions League Two)	0	2	1	40	1
Al-Nassr	Total		87	6	6	0	27	1	9	1	129	8
Career total			467	46	39	6	97	6	12	1	615	59

=== International ===
Appearances and goals by national team and year
National team	Year	Apps	Goals
Croatia	2014	7	1
Croatia	2015	7	2
Croatia	2016	11	3
Croatia	2017	7	0
Croatia	2018	12	0
Croatia	2019	7	0
Croatia	2020	4	0
Croatia	2021	15	1
Croatia	2022	13	0
Croatia	2023	10	0
Croatia	2024	6	0
Total		99	7

Scores and results list Croatia's goal tally first, score column indicates score after each Brozović goal.

List of international goals scored by Marcelo Brozović
No.	Date	Venue	Cap	Opponent	Score	Result	Competition
1	13 October 2014	Stadion Gradski vrt, Osijek, Croatia	6	Azerbaijan	4–0	6–0	UEFA Euro 2016 qualifying
2	28 March 2015	Stadion Maksimir, Zagreb, Croatia	8	Norway	1–0	5–1	UEFA Euro 2016 qualifying
3	17 November 2015	Olimp-2, Rostov-on-Don, Russia	14	Russia	2–1	3–1	Friendly
4	23 March 2016	Stadion Gradski vrt, Osijek, Croatia	15	Israel	2–0	2–0	Friendly
5	12 November 2016	Stadion Maksimir, Zagreb, Croatia	24	Iceland	1–0	2–0	2018 FIFA World Cup qualification
6	12 November 2016	Stadion Maksimir, Zagreb, Croatia	24	Iceland	2–0	2–0	2018 FIFA World Cup qualification
7	4 September 2021	Tehelné pole, Bratislava, Slovakia	65	Slovakia	1–0	1–0	2022 FIFA World Cup qualification

== Honours ==
Dinamo Zagreb

- Prva HNL: 2012–13, 2013–14
- Croatian Supercup: 2013

Inter Milan

- Serie A: 2020–21
- Coppa Italia: 2021–22, 2022–23
- Supercoppa Italiana: 2021, 2022
- UEFA Champions League runner-up: 2022–23
- UEFA Europa League runner-up: 2019–20

Al-Nassr

- Saudi Pro League: 2025–26
- Arab Club Champions Cup: 2023
- King's Cup runner-up: 2023–24
- AFC Champions League Two runner-up: 2025–26

Croatia

- FIFA World Cup runner-up: 2018; third place: 2022
- UEFA Nations League runner-up: 2022–23

Individual

- UEFA Europa League Squad of the Season: 2019–20
- Serie A Best Midfielder: 2021–22
- Serie A Player of the Month: April 2022
- Serie A Team of the Year: 2021–22

Orders

- Order of Duke Branimir: 2018
