= Abdulmalik Al-Oyayari =

Saudi Arabian footballer (born 2003)

Personal information
- Full name: Abdulmalik Ahmed Abdulaziz Al-Oyayari
- Date of birth: 10 December 2003 (age 22)
- Place of birth: Buraidah, Saudi Arabia
- Height: 1.75 m (5 ft 9 in)
- Positions: Right-back; midfielder

Team information
- Current team: Neom
- Number: 15

Youth career
- Al-Taawoun

Senior career*
| Years | Team | Apps | (Gls) |
| 2021–2024 | Al-Taawoun | 49 | (3) |
| 2024– | Neom | 60 | (1) |

International career^{‡}
| 2020–2023 | Saudi Arabia U20 | 5 | (1) |
| 2023– | Saudi Arabia U23 | 11 | (0) |
| 2026– | Saudi Arabia | 1 | (0) |
- * Club domestic league appearances and goals as of 5 November 2026 ‡ National team caps and goals as of 13 November 2026

Abdulmalik Ahmed Abdulaziz Al-Oyayari (Arabic: عبد الملك أحمد عبد العزيز العييري; born 10 December 2003) is a Saudi Arabian professional footballer who currently plays as a right-back or defensive midfielder for Saudi Pro League club Neom and the Saudi Arabia national team.

== Career ==
Al-Oyayari began his career at the youth team of Al-Taawoun. On 8 October 2021, Al-Oyayari signed his first professional contract with the club. On 17 October 2021, Al-Oyayari made his debut for Al-Taawoun by starting in the 3–0 defeat to Al-Fateh. On 4 November 2021, Al-Oyayari scored his first goal for the club in a 3–1 win against Al-Ettifaq. Al-Oyayari ended his first season at the club making 23 appearances across all competitions and scoring 1 goal. On 2 October 2022, Al-Oyayari was substituted off the pitch after getting injured in the league match against Al-Hilal. Later, it was announced that he had injured his ACL and would undergo surgery. Al-Oyayari made his return on 9 May 2023 in the 2–1 win against derby rivals Al-Raed. On 31 August 2023, Al-Oyayari was awarded the Young Player of the Month award for his impressive performances in August. On 23 May 2024, Al-Oyayari scored the opening goal in a 1–1 draw against Al-Fayha. On 27 May 2024, Al-Oyayari scored a 90th-minute winner against Al-Ettifaq, helping Al-Taawoun finish fourth and qualify to the AFC Champions League Two.

On 12 July 2024, Al-Oyayari joined Saudi First Division League club Neom.

== International career ==
In June 2022, he took part in the Maurice Revello Tournament in France with Saudi Arabia team.

== Career statistics ==
As of match played 27 May 2024

| Club | Season | League | | | King's Cup | | Asia | | Total | |
| Club | Season | Division | Apps | Goals | Apps | Goals | Apps | Goals | Apps | Goals |
|---|---|---|---|---|---|---|---|---|---|---|
| Al-Taawoun | 2021–22 | Saudi Pro League | 17 | 1 | 1 | 0 | 5 (Note: Appearances in AFC Champions League) | 0 | 23 | 1 |
| Al-Taawoun | 2022–23 | Saudi Pro League | 7 | 0 | 0 | 0 | — | | 7 | 0 |
| Al-Taawoun | 2023–24 | Saudi Pro League | 25 | 2 | 2 | 0 | — | | 27 | 2 |
| Career total | | | 49 | 3 | 3 | 0 | 5 | 0 | 57 | 3 |

== Honours ==
Individual

- Saudi Pro League Rising Star of the Month: August 2023, May 2024
