= Raghed Al-Najjar =

Saudi Arabian footballer

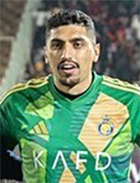
- Al-Najjar with Al Nassr in 2025

Personal information
- Full name: Raghed Al-Najjar
- Date of birth: 20 September 1996 (age 30)
- Place of birth: Jeddah, Saudi Arabia
- Height: 1.89 m (6 ft 2 in)
- Position: Goalkeeper

Team information
- Current team: Al-Nassr
- Number: 36

Youth career
- 2005–2015: Al-Ahli

Senior career*
Years	Team	Apps	(Gls)
2015–2018	Al-Ahli	0	(0)
2015–2016	→ Partizani Tirana (loan)	0	(0)
2018–2019	Al-Shabab	0	(0)
2019–2020	Al-Faisaly	0	(0)
2020–2022	Al-Wehda	10	(0)
2022–2023	Al-Taawoun	3	(0)
2023–	Al-Nassr	6	(0)

International career^{‡}
2024–	Saudi Arabia	1	(0)
- * Club domestic league appearances and goals as of 20 September 2024 ‡ National team caps and goals as of 25 January 2024

Raghed Al-Najjar (Arabic: رَاغِد النَّجَّار; born 20 September 1996) is a Saudi Arabian footballer who plays as a goalkeeper for Pro League club Al-Nassr. He has also earned one cap for the Saudi Arabia national team.

== Club career ==
Born in Jeddah, Al-Najjar was formed in the Al-Ahli youth academy. In August 2015, he joined Albanian club Partizani Tirana, signing his first professional contract. On 16 January 2016, Al Najjar signed his first professional contract with Al-Ahli. On 16 July 2016, Al-Ahli announced that Al-Najjar suffered an anterior cruciate ligament injury.

On 23 August 2018, Al-Najjar joined Al-Shabab on a three-year contract. He was released from his contract without making a single appearance for the club on 17 January 2019. On 19 January 2019, Al-Najjar joined Al-Faisaly on a one-year deal.

On 10 January 2020, Al-Najjar joined Al-Wehda on a three-year deal. On 24 November 2020, Al-Najjar made his professional debut for Al-Wehda in the Saudi Pro League, starting in the 0–1 loss against Al-Taawoun. During the 2021–22 season, Al-Najjar made seven appearances for Al-Wehda helping achieve promotion to the Pro League.

On 2 August 2022, Al-Najjar joined Al-Taawoun on a two-year deal. He made his debut for Al-Taawoun in the 2–1 win against Al-Ittihad, replacing the injured Mailson in the 39th minute.

In September 2023, Al-Najjar joined Al-Nassr, signing a 3-year contract. He made his debut on 21 October 2023 in the 2–1 win against Damac. On 24 November 2023, Al-Najjar made his AFC Champions League debut in his team's 1–1 draw against Istiklol.

== International career ==
In January 2024, Al-Najjar was called up by coach Roberto Mancini to the Saudi Arabia national team squad for the 2023 AFC Asian Cup. He made his international debut in a goalless draw against Thailand in the last group stage game.

== Career statistics ==
=== Club ===
As of match played 5 November 2025

Appearances and goals by club, season and competition
Club	Season	League			King Cup		Asia		Other		Total	
Club	Season	Division	Apps	Goals	Apps	Goals	Apps	Goals	Apps	Goals	Apps	Goals
Al-Ahli	2017–18	Saudi Pro League	0	0	0	0	0	0	—		0	0
Al-Shabab	2018–19	Saudi Pro League	0	0	0	0	—		—		0	0
Al-Faisaly	2018–19	Saudi Pro League	0	0	0	0	—		—		0	0
Al-Faisaly	2019–20	Saudi Pro League	0	0	0	0	—		—		0	0
Al-Faisaly	Total		10	0	0	0	—		—		10	0
Al-Wehda	2019–20	Saudi Pro League	0	0	0	0	—		—		0	0
Al-Wehda	2020–21	Saudi Pro League	3	0	0	0	0	0	—		3	0
Al-Wehda	2021–22	Saudi First Division	7	0	—		—		—		7	0
Al-Wehda	Total		10	0	0	0	0	0	—		10	0
Al-Taawoun	2022–23	Saudi Pro League	3	0	0	0	—		—		3	0
Al-Nassr	2023–24	Saudi Pro League	4	0	0	0	3	0	0	0	7	0
Al-Nassr	2024–25	Saudi Pro League	0	0	0	0	1	0	0	0	1	0
Al-Nassr	2025–26	Saudi Pro League	2	0	0	0	1	0	0	0	3	0
Al-Nassr	Total		6	0	0	0	5	0	0	0	11	0
Career total			19	0	0	0	5	0	0	0	24	0

== Honours ==
Al-Nassr

- Saudi Pro League: 2025–26
