= Abdulelah Al-Amri =

Saudi Arabian footballer (born 1997)

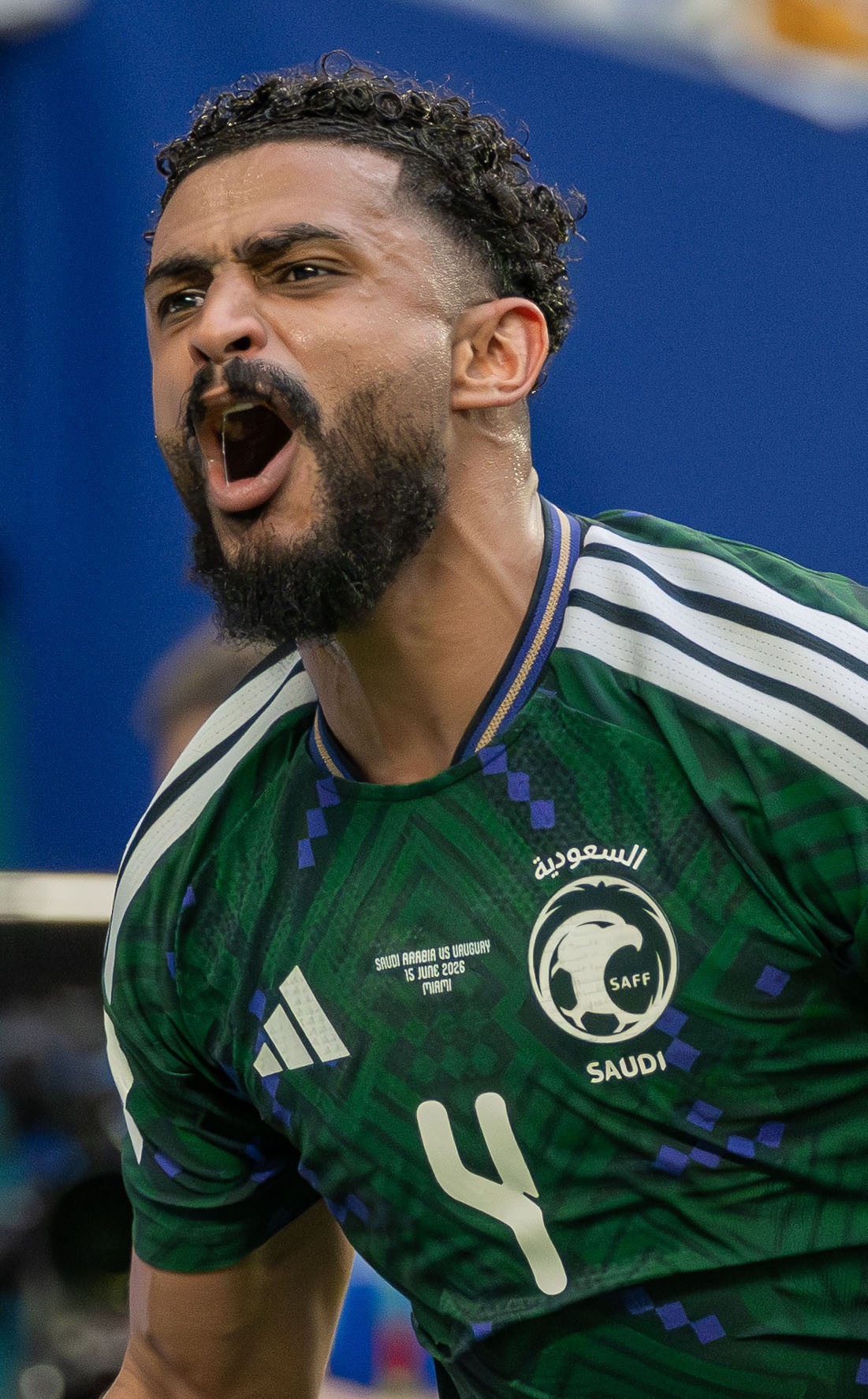
- Al-Amri with Saudi Arabia in 2026

Personal information
- Full name: Abdulelah Ali Awadh Al-Amri
- Date of birth: 15 January 1997 (age 29)
- Place of birth: Taif, Saudi Arabia
- Height: 1.85 m (6 ft 1 in)
- Position: Centre-back

Team information
- Current team: Al-Nassr
- Number: 5

Youth career
- 2011–2015: Wej
- 2015–2018: Al-Nassr

Senior career*
Years	Team	Apps	(Gls)
2017–	Al-Nassr	130	(12)
2018–2019	→ Al-Wehda (loan)	12	(1)
2024–2025	→ Al-Ittihad (loan)	20	(0)

International career^{‡}
2016–2017	Saudi Arabia U-20	10	(2)
2017–2021	Saudi Arabia Olympic	8	(1)
2021–	Saudi Arabia	53	(3)
- * Club domestic league appearances and goals as of 17:45, 23 October 2026 (UTC) ‡ National team caps and goals as of 17 November 2026

Abdulelah Ali Awadh Al-Amri (Arabic: عَبْد الْإِلَه عَلِيّ عَوَض الْعُمَرِيّ; born 15 January 1997) is a Saudi Arabian professional footballer who plays as a centre-back for Saudi Pro League club Al-Nassr and the Saudi Arabia national team.

== Club career ==
Al-Amri progressed through Al-Nassr's youth system. He signed his first professional contract with the club on 27 November 2017. On 14 December 2017, he made his debut in a 1–1 draw against Al-Faisaly.

On 27 May 2018, Al-Amri was loaned to Al-Wehda for the 2018–19 season. Following his return from loan, he was mainly used as a fourth-choice centre-back. However, during the latter half of the 2019–20 season, he managed to establish himself as a starter. He made 15 appearances throughout all competitions. He scored his first goal for the club on 22 February 2020 in a 2–0 win against Al-Hazem.

On 27 January 2021, Al-Amri renewed his contract with Al-Nassr until the end of the 2023–24 season. On 7 December 2023, he renewed his contract with Al-Nassr for a further four years. On 1 September 2024, Al-Amri joined Al-Ittihad on a one-year loan. He returned to Al-Nassr the following season.

== International career ==
Al-Amri has represented Saudi Arabia at under-20 level and under-23 level. He captained the Saudi Arabia under-20 side at the 2017 U-20 World Cup.

He made his debut for the Saudi Arabia national team at the 2019 AFC Asian Cup. He scored his first international goal in a 1–0 win on his debut in a friendly against Kuwait leading up to the Asian Cup.

In July 2021, Al-Amri was named in the squad for the 2020 Olympics. In November 2022, he was named in the squad for the 2022 FIFA World Cup.

On 31 May 2026, he was named in the 26-man squad for the 2026 FIFA World Cup. A month later, Al-Amri scored his first World Cup goal in Saudi Arabia's group opener against Uruguay which ended 1–1.

== Career statistics ==
=== Club ===
As of match played 31 May 2024

Club	Season	League		King Cup		Asia		Other		Total	
Club	Season	Apps	Goals	Apps	Goals	Apps	Goals	Apps	Goals	Apps	Goals
Al-Nassr	2017–18	1	0	0	0	–		–		1	0
Al-Nassr	2019–20	10	1	1	0	4	0	0	0	15	1
Al-Nassr	2020–21	22	3	2	0	6	1	1 (Note: Appearance in Saudi Super Cup)	0	31	4
Al-Nassr	2021–22	19	2	2	0	3	0	–		24	2
Al-Nassr	2022–23	27	0	2	0	–		1	0	30	0
Al-Nassr	2023–24	18	2	4	0	8	1	5 (Note: Appearance in Arab Club Champions Cup)	1	35	3
Al-Nassr	Total	97	8	11	0	21	2	7	1	136	11
Al-Wehda (loan)	2018–19	12	1	0	0	–		–		12	1
Al-Ittihad (loan)	2024–25	0	0	0	0	–		–		0	0
Career total		109	9	11	0	21	2	7	1	148	12

=== International ===
Statistics accurate as of match played 17 November 2026.

Saudi Arabia
Year	Apps	Goals
2021	8	1
2022	15	0
2023	5	0
2024	0	0
2025	12	0
2026	13	2
Total	53	3

=== International goals ===
Scores and results list Saudi Arabia's goal tally first.

Goal	Date	Venue	Cap	Opponent	Score	Result	Competition
1.	25 March 2021	Mrsool Park, Riyadh, Saudi Arabia	1	Kuwait	1–0	1–0	Friendly
2.	15 June 2026	Hard Rock Stadium, Miami Gardens, United States	44	Uruguay	1–0	1–1	2026 FIFA World Cup
3.	13 November 2026	Jassim bin Hamad Stadium, Al Rayyan, Qatar	52	South Korea	3–1	3–2	Friendly

== Honours ==
Al-Nassr

- Saudi Pro League: 2025–26
- Saudi Super Cup: 2019, 2020
- Arab Club Champions Cup: 2023

Al-Ittihad

- Saudi Pro League: 2024–25
- King's Cup: 2024–25

Individual

- Saudi Professional League Young Player of the Month: November 2020, March 2021
