= 2025–26 Al-Ittihad Club season =

Al-Ittihad
2025–26 season
- President: Loay Mashabi
- Manager: Laurent Blanc (until 28 September); Sérgio Conceição (from 7 October)
- Stadium: King Abdullah Sports City
- Pro League: 5th
- King's Cup: Semi-finals
- ACL Elite: Quarter-finals
- Super Cup: Semi-finals
- Top goalscorer: League: Houssem Aouar; Karim Benzema (8 each); All: Karim Benzema (16)
Home colours	Away colours	Third colours

The 2025–26 season was Al-Ittihad's 50th consecutive season in the top flight of Saudi football and 98th year in existence as a football club. The club participated in the Pro League, the King's Cup, the AFC Champions League Elite, and the Saudi Super Cup.

The season covers the period from 1 July 2025 to 30 June 2026.

== Players ==
=== Squad information ===
As of 3 February 2026

Note: Flags indicate national team as defined under FIFA eligibility rules; some limited exceptions apply. Players may hold more than one non-FIFA nationality.

No.	Pos.	Nation	Player
1	GK	SRB	Predrag Rajković
2	DF	POR	Danilo Pereira
6	DF	KSA	Saad Al Mousa
8	MF	BRA	Fabinho
—			
10	MF	ALG	Houssem Aouar
12	DF	ALB	Mario Mitaj
13	DF	KSA	Muhannad Al-Shanqeeti
14	MF	KSA	Awad Al-Nashri
15	DF	KSA	Hassan Kadesh
19	FW	FRA	Moussa Diaby
20	DF	KSA	Ahmed Sharahili
21	FW	KSA	Saleh Al-Shehri
22	MF	KSA	Abdulaziz Al-Bishi

No.	Pos.	Nation	Player
23	MF	KSA	Nawaf Al-Jadaani
24	MF	KSA	Abdulrahman Al-Aboud
27	DF	KSA	Fawaz Al-Sqoor
30	MF	ESP	Unai Hernández
33	GK	KSA	Mohammed Al-Mahasneh
34	FW	NED	Steven Bergwijn
41	MF	KSA	Mohammed Fallatah
42	DF	KSA	Muath Faqeehi
47	GK	KSA	Hamed Al-Shanqiti
55	MF	ARG	Mateo Borrell
77	MF	KSA	Abdulelah Hawsawi
80	MF	KSA	Hamed Al-Ghamdi
87	DF	KSA	Yaseen Al Jaber
88	GK	USA	Lessey McKoad

== Transfers and loans ==
=== Transfers in ===
Entry date	Position	No.	Player	From club	Fee	Ref.
30 June 2025	DF	28	(Saudi Arabia) Ahmed Bamsaud	(Saudi Arabia) Al-Ettifaq	End of loan	
30 June 2025	DF	–	(Saudi Arabia) Abdullah Al-Rashidi	(Saudi Arabia) Al-Batin	End of loan	
30 June 2025	DF	–	(Saudi Arabia) Abdulrahman Al-Obaid	(Saudi Arabia) Al-Najma	End of loan	
30 June 2025	DF	–	(Argentina) Isaías Rodríguez	(Saudi Arabia) Jeddah	End of loan	
30 June 2025	MF	16	(Saudi Arabia) Faisal Al-Ghamdi	(Belgium) Beerschot	End of loan	
30 June 2025	MF	17	(Saudi Arabia) Marwan Al-Sahafi	(Belgium) Beerschot	End of loan	
30 June 2025	MF	27	(Saudi Arabia) Ahmed Al-Ghamdi	(Saudi Arabia) Neom	End of loan	
30 June 2025	MF	29	(Saudi Arabia) Farhah Al-Shamrani	(Saudi Arabia) Al-Kholood	End of loan	
30 June 2025	MF	–	(Saudi Arabia) Saleh Al-Amri	(Saudi Arabia) Al-Raed	End of loan	
30 June 2025	MF	–	(Saudi Arabia) Sultan Al-Farhan	(Saudi Arabia) Al-Taawoun	End of loan	
30 June 2025	MF	–	(Saudi Arabia) Hammam Al-Hammami	(Saudi Arabia) Al-Kholood	End of loan	
30 June 2025	MF	–	(Venezuela) Bryant Ortega	(Saudi Arabia) Jeddah	End of loan	
30 June 2025	FW	90	(Saudi Arabia) Talal Haji	(Saudi Arabia) Al-Riyadh	End of loan	
30 June 2025	FW	–	(Colombia) Ricardo Caraballo	(Saudi Arabia) Jeddah	End of loan	
1 July 2025	DF	66	(Saudi Arabia) Mohammed Barnawi	(Saudi Arabia) Al-Hilal	Free	
12 July 2025	MF	–	(Saudi Arabia) Mohammed Hazazi	(Saudi Arabia) Al-Nassr	Free	
13 July 2025	FW	–	(Saudi Arabia) Adnan Al-Bishri	(Saudi Arabia) Al-Ahli	Free	
18 July 2025	MF	80	(Saudi Arabia) Hamed Al-Ghamdi	(Saudi Arabia) Al-Ettifaq	$10,663,000	
13 August 2025	GK	50	(Saudi Arabia) Mohammed Al-Absi	(Saudi Arabia) Al-Shabab	Swap	
13 August 2025	DF	–	(Saudi Arabia) Ahmed Al-Julaydan	(Saudi Arabia) Al-Fateh	$12,800,000	
5 September 2025	FW	–	(Portugal) Roger Fernandes	(Portugal) Braga	$37,500,000	
8 September 2025	MF	–	(Mali) Mahamadou Doumbia	(Belgium) Royal Antwerp	$18,800,000	

=== Loans in ===
Start date	End date	Position	No.	Player	From club	Fee	Ref.
10 September 2025	End of season	DF	–	(Serbia) Jan-Carlo Simić	(Belgium) Anderlecht	$7,000,000	

=== Transfers out ===
Exit date	Position	No.	Player	To club	Fee	Ref.
30 June 2025	DF	4	(Saudi Arabia) Abdulelah Al-Amri	(Saudi Arabia) Al-Nassr	End of loan	
30 June 2025	MF	80	(Saudi Arabia) Hamed Al-Ghamdi	(Saudi Arabia) Al-Ettifaq	End of loan	
1 July 2025	DF	28	(Saudi Arabia) Ahmed Bamsaud	(Saudi Arabia) Al-Fayha	Free	
9 August 2025	MF	–	(Saudi Arabia) Saleh Al-Amri	(Saudi Arabia) Al-Khaleej	Undisclosed	
10 August 2025	MF	–	(Saudi Arabia) Sultan Al-Farhan	(Saudi Arabia) Al-Diriyah	Undisclosed	
20 August 2025	GK	33	(Saudi Arabia) Mohammed Al-Mahasneh	(Saudi Arabia) Al-Shabab	Free	
28 August 2025	MF	–	(Saudi Arabia) Hammam Al-Hammami	(Saudi Arabia) Al-Shabab	Swap	
February 2, 2026	FW	9	(France) Karim Benzema	(Saudi Arabia) Al Hilal	Free	
February 3, 2026	MF	7	(France) N'Golo Kanté	(Turkey) Fenerbahçe	Free	

=== Loans out ===
Start date	End date	Position	No.	Player	To club	Fee	Ref.
11 August 2025	End of season	MF	77	(Saudi Arabia) Abdulelah Hawsawi	(Saudi Arabia) Al-Taawoun	None	
21 August 2025	End of season	MF	17	(Saudi Arabia) Marwan Al-Sahafi	(Belgium) Antwerp	None	
21 August 2025	End of season	FW	–	(Colombia) Ricardo Caraballo	(Saudi Arabia) Al-Anwar	None	
4 September 2025	End of season	MF	55	(Argentina) Mateo Borrell	(Saudi Arabia) Al-Okhdood	None	
9 September 2025	End of season	MF	30	(Spain) Unai Hernández	(Saudi Arabia) Al-Shabab	None	
10 September 2025	End of season	MF	29	(Saudi Arabia) Farhah Al-Shamrani	(Saudi Arabia) Al-Riyadh	None	
10 September 2025	End of season	FW	90	(Saudi Arabia) Talal Haji	(Saudi Arabia) Al-Riyadh	None	
30 September 2025	End of season	MF	–	(Venezuela) Bryant Ortega	(United Arab Emirates) Khor Fakkan	None	

== Pre-season ==
23 July 2025 Friendly	Al-Ittihad (Saudi Arabia)	0–4	(Turkey) Fenerbahçe	Albufeira, Portugal
20:00 WEST		Report	En-Nesyri 9'; Szymański 16'; Durán 77', 88'	Stadium: Estádio Municipal de Albufeira

26 July 2025 Friendly	Al-Ittihad (Saudi Arabia)	1–3	(Portugal) Vitória	Almancil, Portugal
18:00 WEST	Diaby 55'	Report	Silva 39'; Camara 84'; Oliveira 90+3'	Stadium: The Campus, Quinta do Lago Sports Complex

30 July 2025 Friendly	Al-Ittihad (Saudi Arabia)	2–4	(England) Fulham	Faro, Portugal
19:00 WEST	Benzema 69', 74'	Report	Wilson 7'; Smith Rowe 22'; King 39'; Cuenca 45+1'	Stadium: Estádio de São Luís

2 August 2025 Friendly	Al-Ittihad (Saudi Arabia)	1–2	(Portugal) Portimonense	Portimão, Portugal
20:00 WEST	Al-Sahafi 90+2'	Report	Grolli 51'; Mamede 61'	Stadium: Estádio Municipal de Portimão

4 August 2025 Friendly	Al-Ittihad (Saudi Arabia)	5–1	(Portugal) Leiria	Faro/Loulé, Portugal
20:00 WEST	Bergwijn 66'; Al-Mousa 69'; Al-Aboud 85'; Al-Shehri 90'; F. Al-Ghamdi 90+4'	Report	Rodríguez 75'	Stadium: Estádio Algarve

== Competitions ==
=== Overview ===
Competition	First match	Last match	Starting round	Final position	Record							
Competition	First match	Last match	Starting round	Final position	Pld	W	D	L	GF	GA	GD	Win %
Pro League	30 August 2025	21 May 2026	Matchday 1	5th	34	16	7	11	55	48	+7	47.06
King's Cup	23 September 2025	18 March 2026	Round of 32	Semi-finals	4	3	1	0	9	4	+5	75.00
ACL Elite	15 September 2025	17 April 2026	League stage	Quarter-finals	10	6	0	4	23	10	+13	60.00
Super Cup	19 August 2025		Semi-finals	Semi-finals	1	0	0	1	1	2	−1	0.00
Total					49	25	8	16	88	64	+24	51.02

Source: Competitions

=== Pro League ===
==== League table ====
Pos	Team	Pld	W	D	L	GF	GA	GD	Pts	Qualification or relegation
3	Al-Ahli	34	25	6	3	71	25	+46	81	Qualification for AFC Champions League Elite league stage (Note: Al-Ahli also qualified as 2025–26 AFC Champions League Elite winners.)
4	Al-Qadsiah	34	23	8	3	83	34	+49	77	Qualification for AFC Champions League Elite league stage
5	Al-Ittihad	34	16	7	11	55	48	+7	55	Qualification for AFC Champions League Elite preliminary stage
6	Al-Taawoun	34	15	8	11	59	46	+13	53	Qualification for AFC Champions League Two group stage (Note: Since the winners of the 2025–26 King's Cup, Al-Hilal, had already qualified for the Champions League Elite, the spot given to the King's Cup winners (Champions League Two) was passed to the sixth-placed team.)
7	Al-Ettifaq	34	14	8	12	51	55	−4	50	Qualification for GFF Gulf Club Champions League group stage

Source: SPL
Rules for classification: 1) Points; 2) Head-to-head points; 3) Head-to-head goal difference; 4) Total goal difference; 5) Total goals scored; 6) Fair-play points
(Note: Head-to-head record is used only after all the matches between the teams in question have been played).

==== Results summary ====
Overall								Home						Away					
Pld	W	D	L	GF	GA	GD	Pts	W	D	L	GF	GA	GD	W	D	L	GF	GA	GD
34	16	7	11	55	48	+7	55	10	1	6	22	21	+1	6	6	5	33	27	+6

Source: Saudi Pro League

==== Results by round ====
Round	1	2	3	4	5	6	7	8	9	11	12	13	14	15	16	17	18	19	20	21	22	23	10	24	25	26	27	28	29	30	31	32	33	34
Ground	A	H	A	H	A	H	A	H	H	H	A	H	A	A	H	A	H	A	H	A	H	A	A	H	A	A	H	A	H	A	H	H	A	H
Result	W	W	W	L	D	L	D	L	W	W	W	W	W	D	L	L	W	D																
Position	2	3	2	3	5	7	8	8	7	6	6	6	6	6	6	6	6	6																

Updated to match(es) played on 30 January 2026. Source: Saudi Pro League
A = Away; H = Home; W = Win; D = Draw; L = Loss

==== Matches ====
All times are local, AST (UTC+3).

Win Draw Loss Postponed

30 August 2025 1	Al-Okhdood	2–5	Al-Ittihad	Najran
21:00	Pedroza 27', 57'; Al-Rubaie (yellow card) 36'; Asiri (yellow card) 49' (yellow-red card) 83'; Al-Jahif (yellow card) 70'	Report	Benzema 4', 51', 60'; Bergwijn 7'; Al-Rubaie 29' (o.g.); Diaby (yellow card) 78'	Stadium: Prince Hathloul bin Abdulaziz Sports City; Attendance: 3,911; Referee: Mohammed Al-Hoaish

12 September 2025 2	Al-Ittihad	4–2	Al-Fateh	Jeddah
21:00	Aouar 22', (yellow card) 42'; Pereira (yellow card) 26'; Bergwijn 35', 39'; Faqeehi (yellow card) 36'; Rajković (red card) 58'; Al-Absi (yellow card) 67'; Al-Shanqeeti 90+1'	Report	Vargas 33'; Batna (yellow card) 41' (yellow-red card) 45+1'; Bendebka 69' (pen.); Al Shurafa (yellow card) 73'; Baattiah (yellow card) 81'	Stadium: Alinma Stadium; Attendance: 40,359; Referee: Faisal Al-Blwi

20 September 2025 3	Al-Najma	0–1	Al-Ittihad	Buraidah
18:40	Al-Shammeri (yellow card) 53'	Report	Mitaj (yellow card) 29'; Aouar (yellow card) 60'; Al-Mousa (yellow card) 73'; Bergwijn (yellow card) 86'; Kanté 90+6'	Stadium: King Abdullah Sports City; Attendance: 2,659; Referee: Mohammed Al-Hoaish

26 September 2025 4	Al-Ittihad	0–2	Al-Nassr	Jeddah
21:00	Bergwijn (yellow card) 80'; Sharahili (yellow card) 82'	Report	Mané 9'; Ronaldo 35'	Stadium: Alinma Stadium; Attendance: 53,282; Referee: Donatas Rumšas (Lithuania)

17 October 2025 5	Al-Fayha	1–1	Al-Ittihad	Al Majma'ah
18:05	Semedo (yellow card) 20'; Sakala 45'; Jason (yellow card) 47'	Report	Al-Mousa (yellow card) 42'; A. Al-Ghamdi 64'; Al-Julaydan (yellow card) 90+5'	Stadium: Al-Majma'ah Sports City Stadium; Attendance: 3,098; Referee: Majed Al-Shamrani

24 October 2025 6	Al-Ittihad	0–2	Al-Hilal	Jeddah
21:00	Al-Mousa (yellow card) 18'; Mitaj (yellow card) 28'; Doumbia (yellow card) 90+2'	Report	Koulibaly (yellow card) 15'; Doumbia 41' (o.g.); Leonardo 57'; Hernández (yellow card) 68'	Stadium: Alinma Stadium; Attendance: 46,542; Referee: Darío Herrera (Argentina)

1 November 2025 7	Al-Khaleej	4–4	Al-Ittihad	Dammam
17:35	King 14', 47'; Fortounis 18', 37' (pen.); Schenkeveld (yellow card) 29'; Hawsawi (yellow card) 45+3'; Al Haydar (yellow card) 90+7'	Report	Mitaj (yellow card) 22', (goal) 90+6'; Al-Shehri (yellow card) 27'; Fabinho (red card) 32'; Diaby 51', 86', (yellow card) 90+8'; F. Al-Ghamdi 90+8'	Stadium: Prince Mohamed bin Fahd Stadium; Attendance: 13,504; Referee: Sami Al-Jires

8 November 2025 8	Al-Ittihad	0–1	Al-Ahli	Jeddah
20:30		Report	Millot (yellow card) 51'; Mahrez 55', (yellow card) 90+3'; Sulaiman (yellow card) 56'; Gonçalves (yellow card) 76'	Stadium: Alinma Stadium; Attendance: 46,027; Referee: Szymon Marciniak (Poland)

21 November 2025 9	Al-Ittihad	2–1	Al-Riyadh	Jeddah
16:45	Benzema 24'; Al-Khaibari 42' (o.g.); Diaby (red card) 73'	Report	Sylla 77'; Borjan (yellow card) 90+6'	Stadium: Prince Abdullah Al-Faisal Sports City Stadium; Attendance: 13,447; Referee: Shukri Al-Hanfoush

27 December 2025 11	Al-Ittihad	2–0	Al-Shabab	Jeddah
20:30	A. Al-Ghamdi 16'; Mitaj (yellow card) 43'; Bergwijn 85'	Report	Abdullah (yellow card) 70'	Stadium: Alinma Stadium; Attendance: 15,871; Referee: Mohammed Al-Hoaish

31 December 2025 12	Neom	1–3	Al-Ittihad	Tabuk
18:25	Koné (yellow card) 25'; Benrahma 27'	Report	Fernandes 14'; Bergwijn 68'; A. Al-Ghamdi 90+6'	Stadium: King Khalid Sport City Stadium; Attendance: 7,052; Referee: Khalid Al-Turais

3 January 2026 13	Al-Ittihad	1–0	Al-Taawoun	Jeddah
20:30	Al-Shanqeeti 50'; Sharahili (yellow card) 56'	Report	Sémbène (yellow card) 59'	Stadium: Prince Abdullah Al-Faisal Sports City Stadium; Attendance: 11,141; Referee: Mohammed Al-Ismail

9 January 2026 14	Al-Kholood	0–4	Al-Ittihad	Buraidah
20:30	Troost-Ekong (red card) 8'	Report	Benzema 13' (pen.), 28', 35'; Al-Shehri 84'	Stadium: King Abdullah Sports City; Attendance: 5,537; Referee: Sultan Al-Harbi

13 January 2026 15	Damac	1–1	Al-Ittihad	Abha
20:30	Al-Qahtani 37'	Report	Al-Shanqeeti 45', (yellow card) 59'; Fabinho (yellow card) 69' (yellow-red card) 90+8'; Bergwijn (yellow card) 90+11'	Stadium: Prince Sultan bin Abdulaziz Sports City Stadium; Attendance: 9,065; Referee: Khalid Al-Turais

16 January 2026 16	Al-Ittihad	0–1	Al-Ettifaq	Jeddah
20:30	Fernandes (yellow card) 21'; Doumbia (yellow card) 27'; Rajković (red card) 85'	Report	Al-Khateeb (yellow card) 49'; Al-Ghannam 54'; Al-Ghamdi (yellow card) 56'; Rodák (yellow card) 69'; Hindi (yellow card) 86'; Medrán (yellow card) 90+5'	Stadium: Alinma Stadium; Attendance: 28,363; Referee: Abdullah Al-Owaydan

22 January 2026 17	Al-Qadsiah	2–1	Al-Ittihad	Dammam
20:30	Álvarez (yellow card) 28'; Quiñones 37', 59', (yellow card) 90+7'; Bonsu Baah (yellow card) 51'	Report	Benzema 29' (pen.), (yellow card) 75'; Mitaj (yellow card) 39'	Stadium: Prince Mohamed bin Fahd Stadium; Attendance: 15,570; Referee: Facundo Tello (Argentina)

26 January 2026 18	Al-Ittihad	2–1	Al-Okhdood	Jeddah
20:30	Aouar 12'; Kanté 43'	Report	Asiri (yellow card) 14'; İnce 59'; Hawsawi (yellow card) 64'	Stadium: Alinma Stadium; Attendance: 8,102; Referee: Shukri Al-Hanfoush

29 January 2026 19	Al-Fateh	2–2	Al-Ittihad	Al-Hasa
18:00	Vargas (yellow card) 29', (goal) 90+9'; Batna 74' (pen.); Saâdane (yellow card) 90+11'	Report	Al-Shehri 25', 84' (pen.)	Stadium: Maydan Tamweel Aloula; Attendance: 10,966; Referee: Majed Al-Shamrani

1 February 2026 20	Al-Ittihad	1–0	Al-Najma SC	Jeddah
20:30 ART	Doumbia 4'; Al-Ghamdi (yellow card) 78'; Mitaj (yellow card) 85'	Report	Hawsawi (yellow card) 2'; Flores (yellow card) 90+5'	Stadium: Alinma Stadium; Attendance: 6,844; Referee: (Saudi Arabia) Abdullah Al-Harbi

6 February 2026 21	Al-Nassr	2–0	Al-Ittihad	Riyadh
20:30 ART	Mané 85' (pen.); Coman (yellow card) 86'; Al-Amri (yellow card) 90+6'; Ângelo 90+7'	Report	Al-Julaydan (yellow card) 28'; Fabinho (yellow card) 49'; Al-Ghamdi (yellow card) 62'; Pereira (yellow card) 82'	Stadium: Al-Awwal Park; Attendance: 24,604; Referee: (Slovenia) Slavko Vinčić

13 February 2026 22	Al-Ittihad	2–1	Al-Fayha Club	Jeddah
20:30 ART	En-Nesyri 35'; Kadesh 83'	Report	Sakala 55'; Alfa Semedo (yellow card) 73'; Villanueva (yellow card) 85'	Stadium: Alinma Stadium; Attendance: 16,618; Referee: (Saudi Arabia) Abdullah Al Shehri

21 February 2026 23	Al Hilal	1–1	Al-Ittihad	Riyadh
22:00 ART	Malcom 5'	Report	Kadesh (red card) 9'; Aouar 53' (yellow card) 85'; Al-Nashri (yellow card) 83'	Stadium: Kingdom Arena; Attendance: 22,264; Referee: (Spain) Ricardo De Burgos Bengochea

24 February 2026 10	Al-Hazem	1–1	Al-Ittihad	Buraidah
22:00 ART	Abdulaziz Al-Harbi (yellow card) 43'; Mokwana (yellow card) 48'; Abdulaziz Al Dhuwayhi 84'	Report	Ilenikhena (yellow card) 36'; Bergwijn (yellow card) 43'; Fernandes 80' (yellow card) 80'	Stadium: King Abdullah Sports City; Attendance: 3,223; Referee: (Saudi Arabia) Shukri Al Hanfosh

27 February 2026 24	Al-Ittihad	1-0	Al-Khaleej	Jeddah
22:00 ART	Fabinho (yellow card) 12'; Pereira 52'; Al-Aboud (yellow card) 84'; Al-Bishi (yellow card) 90+5'	Report	Assiri (yellow card) 18'; Rebocho (yellow card) 45+2'; Al-Eisa (yellow card) 79'	Stadium: Alinma Stadium; Attendance: 6,579; Referee: (Saudi Arabia) Mohammed Al Hoaish

6 March 2026 25	Al-Ahli	3-1	Al-Ittihad	Jeddah
22:00 ART	Galeno (yellow card) 20'; Toney 23'; Mahrez 59'; Al-Buraikan 84'; Mendy (yellow card) 90+7'	Report	Fabinho (yellow card) 32' (goal) 51' (pen.); Doumbia (yellow card) 40'; Pereira (yellow card) 88'	Stadium: Alinma Stadium; Attendance: 50,422; Referee: (Montenegro) Nikola Dabanović

13 March 2026 26	Al-Riyadh	3-1	Al-Ittihad	Riyadh
22:00 ART	Ahmed Al Siyahi (yellow card) 22'; Antunes 48'; Tozé 80'; Sylla 90+4'	Report	En-Nesyri 4'	Stadium: SHG Arena; Attendance: 4,369; Referee: (Saudi Arabia) Fareeh Al Jaloud

3 April 2026 27	Al-Ittihad	v	Al-Hazem	Jeddah
				Stadium: Alinma Stadium

8 April 2026 29	Al-Ittihad	v	Neom	Jeddah
				Stadium: Alinma Stadium

29 April 2026 30	Al Taawoun	v	Al-Ittihad	Buraydah
				Stadium: King Abdullah Sports City Stadium

4 May 2026 31	Al-Ittihad	v	Al-Kholood Club	Jeddah
				Stadium: Alinma Stadium

10 May 2026 32	Al-Ittihad	v	Damac Club	Jeddah
				Stadium: Alinma Stadium

14 May 2026 33	Al-Ettifaq	v	Al-Ittihad	Dammam
				Stadium: EGO STADIUM

17 May 2026 28	Al Shabab Club	v	Al-Ittihad	Riyadh
				Stadium: SHG Arena

21 May 2026 34	Al-Ittihad	v	Al Qadsiah	Jeddah
				Stadium: Alinma Stadium

=== King's Cup ===
All times are local, AST (UTC+3).

23 September 2025 Round of 32	Al-Wehda	0–1	Al-Ittihad	Mecca
21:30	A. Khodari (yellow card) 39'; Al-Maqadi (yellow card) 70'; Fallatah (yellow card) 90+2'	Report	Al-Shehri 9' (pen.); Simić (yellow card) 37'; Al-Julaydan (yellow card) 42'	Stadium: King Abdulaziz Sports City; Referee: Ahmed Al-Rumaikhani

28 October 2025 Round of 16	Al-Nassr	1–2	Al-Ittihad	Riyadh
21:00	Al-Khaibari (yellow card) 14'; Ângelo 30'; Simakan (yellow card) 38'	Report	Fabinho (yellow card) 10'; Benzema 15'; Aouar (yellow card) 38', (goal) 45+2'; Al-Julaydan (red card) 49'	Stadium: Al-Awwal Park; Attendance: 23,649; Referee: Khalid Al-Turais

29 November 2025 Quarter-finals	Al-Ittihad	4–1	Al-Shabab	Jeddah
20:30	Doumbia 20'; Pereira (yellow card) 21'; Benzema 30', 84', 87'	Report	Hamdallah 14'; Adli (yellow card) 39'; Brownhill (yellow card) 48'	Stadium: Prince Abdullah Al-Faisal Sports City Stadium; Attendance: 15,292; Referee: Danny Makkelie (Netherlands)

18 March 2026 Semi-finals	Al-Kholood	2–2 (a.e.t.) (5–4 p)	Al-Ittihad	Ar Rass
22:00	Al-Aliwa 73'; Berry 111'	Report	Diaby 40'; Bergwijn 96'	Stadium: Al-Hazem Club Stadium; Attendance: 2,067; Referee: Sergey Ivanov (Russia)
	Penalties
	Pinas (penalty scored); Guga (penalty scored); Utkus (penalty scored); Al-Dawsari (penalty scored); Gyömbér (penalty missed); Kortajarena (penalty scored)		(penalty scored) Fabinho; (penalty missed) Aouar; (penalty scored) Pereira; (penalty scored) Mitaj; (penalty scored) Al-Shehri; (penalty missed) Diaby

=== Super Cup ===
19 August 2025 Semi-finals	Al-Nassr	2–1	Al-Ittihad	Causeway Bay, Hong Kong
20:00 UTC+8	Mané 10', (red card) 25'; Félix 61'; Wesley (yellow card) 90+2'; Brozović (yellow card) 90+6'	Report	Bergwijn 16'; Fabinho (yellow card) 45+1'; Al-Shanqeeti (yellow card) 53'; F. Al-Ghamdi (yellow card) 90+2'	Stadium: Hong Kong Stadium; Attendance: 30,653; Referee: Khalid Al-Turais

=== AFC Champions League Elite ===
==== League stage ====
Pos	Team	Pld	W	D	L	GF	GA	GD	Pts	Qualification
2	(Saudi Arabia) Al-Ahli	8	5	2	1	21	9	+12	17	Advance to round of 16
3	(Iran) Tractor	8	5	2	1	12	4	+8	17	Advance to round of 16
4	(Saudi Arabia) Al-Ittihad	8	5	0	3	22	9	+13	15	Advance to round of 16
5	(United Arab Emirates) Al Wahda	8	4	2	2	11	7	+4	14	Advance to round of 16
6	(United Arab Emirates) Shabab Al Ahli	8	3	2	3	14	14	0	11	Advance to round of 16

Source: AFC
Rules for classification: 1) points; 2) goal difference; 3) number of goals scored; 4) number of matches won; 5) penalty shoot-out if only two teams remain tied and played each other on the final matchday 6) fair play ranking; 7) drawing of lots

15 September 2025 1	Al Wahda (United Arab Emirates)	2–1	(Saudi Arabia) Al-Ittihad	Abu Dhabi, United Arab Emirates
20:00 UTC+4	Canedo (yellow card) 50'; Ghorbani (yellow card) 58'; Caio 62'; Pimenta 90+8', (yellow card) 90+10'	Report	Bergwijn 21'; Al-Shanqeeti (red card) 37'; Al-Mousa (yellow card) 65'; Fabinho (yellow card) 67'	Stadium: Al Nahyan Stadium; Attendance: 12,131; Referee: Salman Ahmad Falahi (Qatar)

30 September 2025 2	Al-Ittihad (Saudi Arabia)	0–1	(United Arab Emirates) Shabab Al Ahli	Jeddah, Saudi Arabia
21:15 UTC+3	Al-Julaydan (yellow card) 23'; Doumbia (yellow card) 76'; Fernandes (yellow card) 81'	Report	Ezatolahi 40'; Gomes (yellow card) 45+2'; Breno (yellow card) 80'; Bala (yellow card) 87'	Stadium: King Abdullah Sports City Stadium; Attendance: 24,179; Referee: Adham Makhadmeh (Jordan)

20 October 2025 3	Al-Shorta (Iraq)	1–4	(Saudi Arabia) Al-Ittihad	Baghdad, Iraq
19:00 UTC+3	Shakir 5'; Al-Mawas (yellow card) 11'	Report	Pereira (yellow card) 11' (yellow-red card) 50'; Diaby 17'; Fabinho 29'; Aouar 60', 76'; Doumbia (yellow card) 85'	Stadium: Al-Madina International Stadium; Attendance: 30,647; Referee: Omar Al Ali (United Arab Emirates)

4 November 2025 4	Al-Ittihad (Saudi Arabia)	3–0	(United Arab Emirates) Sharjah	Jeddah, Saudi Arabia
21:15 UTC+3	Bergwijn 8', (yellow card) 50'; Simić (yellow card) 33'; Benzema 66'; Fernandes 90+4'	Report	Luanzinho (yellow card) 53'; Cho Yu-min (yellow card) 64'	Stadium: King Abdullah Sports City Stadium; Attendance: 20,541; Referee: Ahmed Al-Kaf (Oman)

24 November 2025 5	Al-Duhail (Qatar)	4–2	(Saudi Arabia) Al-Ittihad	Abdullah Bin Khalifa Stadium, Doha
19:00 UTC+3	Boulbina 5', 33', 53'; Piątek 74'	Report	Benzema 76', 83'	Attendance: 6,384; Referee: Alireza Faghani (Australia)

23 December 2025 6	Al-Ittihad (Saudi Arabia)	1–0	(Uzbekistan) Nasaf	King Abdullah Sports City Stadium, Jeddah
21:15 UTC+3	Benzema 57'	Report		Attendance: 14,829; Referee: Kim Jong-hyeok (South Korea)

10 February 2026 7	Al-Ittihad (Saudi Arabia)	7–0	(Qatar) Al-Gharafa	Jeddah, Saudi Arabia
21:15 UTC+3	En-Nesyri 3'; Aouar 20' 58' 79'; Fernandes (yellow card) 32' (goal) 49' 62'; Pereira 51'	Report	Díaz (yellow card) 56'; Brahimi (yellow card) 80'	Stadium: King Abdullah Sports City Stadium; Attendance: 43,610; Referee: (Jordan) Adham Makhadmeh

17 February 2026 8	Al-Sadd (Qatar)	1–4	(Saudi Arabia) Al-Ittihad	Doha, Qatar
19:00 UTC+3	Mujica 38'; Mancini (yellow card) 45+5'	Report	Aouar 10'; En-Nesyri 18'; Pedro Miguel 33' (o.g.); Fabinho (yellow card) 58'; Keller 63'; Al-Nashri (yellow card) 89'	Stadium: Jassim bin Hamad Stadium; Attendance: 12,763; Referee: (Japan) Yusuke Araki

==== Round of 16 ====
14 April 2026 Round of 16	Al-Ittihad (Saudi Arabia)	–	(United Arab Emirates) Al Wahda	Jeddah, Saudi Arabia
21:00 UTC+3				Stadium: King Abdullah Sports City Stadium

== Statistics ==
=== Appearances ===
Last updated on 29 January 2026.

No.	Pos	Nat	Player	Total		Pro League		King's Cup		ACL Elite		Super Cup	
No.	Pos	Nat	Player	Apps	Goals	Apps	Goals	Apps	Goals	Apps	Goals	Apps	Goals
Goalkeepers
1	GK	(Serbia) SRB	Predrag Rajković	23	0	14	0	3	0	6	0	0	0
47	GK	(Saudi Arabia) KSA	Hamed Al-Shanqiti	2	0	1	0	0	0	0	0	1	0
50	GK	(Saudi Arabia) KSA	Mohammed Al-Absi	5	0	3+2	0	0	0	0	0	0	0
88	GK	(Saudi Arabia) KSA	Osama Al-Mermesh	0	0	0	0	0	0	0	0	0	0
Defenders
2	DF	(Portugal) POR	Danilo Pereira	26	0	18	0	2	0	5	0	1	0
4	DF	(Serbia) SRB	Jan-Carlo Simić	7	0	0+1	0	1	0	4+1	0	0	0
6	DF	(Saudi Arabia) KSA	Saad Al Mousa	10	0	7	0	1	0	1	0	1	0
12	DF	(Albania) ALB	Mario Mitaj	19	1	9	1	2+1	0	5+1	0	1	0
13	DF	(Saudi Arabia) KSA	Muhannad Al-Shanqeeti	22	3	14+1	3	1+1	0	4	0	1	0
15	DF	(Saudi Arabia) KSA	Hassan Kadesh	15	0	12	0	1	0	1+1	0	0	0
20	DF	(Saudi Arabia) KSA	Ahmed Sharahili	11	0	5+4	0	0+1	0	0+1	0	0	0
32	DF	(Saudi Arabia) KSA	Ahmed Al-Julaydan	21	0	4+11	0	2	0	2+2	0	0	0
37	DF	(Saudi Arabia) KSA	Fawaz Al-Sqoor	2	0	0+1	0	0	0	0+1	0	0	0
42	DF	(Saudi Arabia) KSA	Muath Faqeehi	6	0	2+2	0	1	0	0+1	0	0	0
66	DF	(Saudi Arabia) KSA	Mohammed Barnawi	1	0	0+1	0	0	0	0	0	0	0
87	DF	(Saudi Arabia) KSA	Yaseen Al-Jaber	3	0	0+1	0	0+1	0	0+1	0	0	0
Midfielders
7	MF	(France) FRA	N'Golo Kanté	26	2	18	2	2	0	5	0	1	0
8	MF	(Brazil) BRA	Fabinho	25	1	16	0	2	0	6	1	1	0
10	MF	(Algeria) ALG	Houssem Aouar	16	5	9	2	1+1	1	4	2	1	0
14	MF	(Saudi Arabia) KSA	Awad Al-Nashri	7	0	1+3	0	1	0	0+2	0	0	0
16	MF	(Saudi Arabia) KSA	Faisal Al-Ghamdi	12	1	1+5	1	1+1	0	1+2	0	0+1	0
17	MF	(Mali) MLI	Mahamadou Doumbia	14	1	5+2	0	2	1	3+2	0	0	0
22	MF	(Saudi Arabia) KSA	Abdulaziz Al-Bishi	10	0	0+10	0	0	0	0	0	0	0
24	MF	(Saudi Arabia) KSA	Abdulrahman Al-Aboud	10	0	0+6	0	1+1	0	0+1	0	0+1	0
27	MF	(Saudi Arabia) KSA	Ahmed Al-Ghamdi	21	3	3+11	3	1+1	0	1+4	0	0	0
41	MF	(Saudi Arabia) KSA	Mohammed Fallatah	1	0	0	0	0	0	0+1	0	0	0
80	MF	(Saudi Arabia) KSA	Hamed Al-Ghamdi	9	0	0+6	0	0+2	0	1	0	0	0
Forwards
9	FW	(France) FRA	Karim Benzema	21	16	14	8	2	4	4	4	1	0
11	FW	(Saudi Arabia) KSA	Saleh Al-Shehri	19	4	4+9	3	1	1	1+3	0	0+1	0
19	FW	(France) FRA	Moussa Diaby	25	3	17	2	1	0	6	1	1	0
34	FW	(Netherlands) NED	Steven Bergwijn	20	8	12	5	1+1	0	5	2	1	1
78	FW	(Portugal) POR	Roger Fernandes	17	2	9	1	3	0	1+4	1	0	0
Players sent out on loan this season
30	MF	(Spain) ESP	Unai Hernández	1	0	0	0	0	0	0	0	0+1	0

=== Goalscorers ===
Rank	No.	Pos	Nat	Name	Pro League	King's Cup	ACL Elite	Super Cup	Total
1	9	FW	(France)	Karim Benzema	8	4	4	0	16
2	34	FW	(Netherlands)	Steven Bergwijn	5	0	2	1	8
3	10	MF	(Algeria)	Houssem Aouar	2	1	2	0	5
4	11	FW	(Saudi Arabia)	Saleh Al-Shehri	3	1	0	0	4
5	13	DF	(Saudi Arabia)	Muhannad Al-Shanqeeti	3	0	0	0	3
5	19	FW	(France)	Moussa Diaby	2	0	1	0	3
5	27	MF	(Saudi Arabia)	Ahmed Al-Ghamdi	3	0	0	0	3
8	7	MF	(France)	N'Golo Kanté	2	0	0	0	2
8	78	FW	(Portugal)	Roger Fernandes	1	0	1	0	2
10	8	MF	(Brazil)	Fabinho	0	0	1	0	1
10	12	DF	(Albania)	Mario Mitaj	1	0	0	0	1
10	16	MF	(Saudi Arabia)	Faisal Al-Ghamdi	1	0	0	0	1
10	17	MF	(Mali)	Mahamadou Doumbia	0	1	0	0	1
Own goal					2	0	0	0	2
Total					33	7	11	1	52

Last Updated: 29 January 2026

=== Assists ===
Rank	No.	Pos.	Nat.	Player	Pro League	King's Cup	ACL Elite	Super Cup	Total
1	19	FW	(France)	Moussa Diaby	5	1	4	1	11
2	13	DF	(Saudi Arabia)	Muhannad Al-Shanqeeti	4	0	1	0	5
3	27	MF	(Saudi Arabia)	Ahmed Al-Ghamdi	1	1	1	0	3
4	8	MF	(Brazil)	Fabinho	1	0	1	0	2
4	12	DF	(Albania)	Mario Mitaj	0	2	0	0	2
4	17	MF	(Mali)	Mahamadou Doumbia	0	0	2	0	2
4	34	FW	(Netherlands)	Steven Bergwijn	2	0	0	0	2
4	78	FW	(Portugal)	Roger Fernandes	1	0	1	0	2
9	7	MF	(France)	N'Golo Kanté	1	0	0	0	1
9	10	MF	(Algeria)	Houssem Aouar	1	0	0	0	1
9	11	FW	(Saudi Arabia)	Saleh Al-Shehri	1	0	0	0	1
9	16	MF	(Saudi Arabia)	Faisal Al-Ghamdi	1	0	0	0	1
9	24	MF	(Saudi Arabia)	Abdulrahman Al-Aboud	1	0	0	0	1
Total					19	4	10	1	34

Last Updated: 26 January 2026

=== Clean sheets ===
Rank	No.	Pos.	Nat.	Player	Pro League	King's Cup	ACL Elite	Super Cup	Total
1	1	GK	(Serbia)	Predrag Rajković	3	1	2	0	6
2	50	GK	(Saudi Arabia)	Mohammed Al-Absi	1	0	0	0	1
Total					4	1	2	0	7

Last Updated: 9 January 2026
