= 2024–25 Al-Ittihad Club season =

Al-Ittihad
2024–25 season
- President: Loay Nazer (until 14 July); Loay Mashabi (from 14 July)
- Manager: Laurent Blanc
- Stadium: King Abdullah Sports City
- Pro League: 1st
- King's Cup: Winners
- Top goalscorer: League: Karim Benzema (21); All: Karim Benzema (25)
- Highest home attendance: 58,117 v Damac; 26 May 2025; Saudi Pro League
- Lowest home attendance: 8,049 v Al-Ain; 24 November 2024; King's Cup
- Average home league attendance: 34,960
Home colours	Away colours	Third colours

The 2024–25 season was Al-Ittihad's 49th consecutive season in the top flight of Saudi football and 97th year in existence as a football club. The club participated in the Pro League and the King's Cup, winning both as part of a domestic double under new manager Laurent Blanc.

The season covers the period from 1 July 2024 to 30 June 2025.

== Players ==
=== Squad information ===
As of 1 February 2025

Note: Flags indicate national team as defined under FIFA eligibility rules; some limited exceptions apply. Players may hold more than one non-FIFA nationality.

No.	Pos.	Nation	Player
1	GK	SRB	Predrag Rajković
2	DF	POR	Danilo Pereira
4	DF	KSA	Abdulelah Al-Amri (on loan from Al-Nassr)
6	DF	KSA	Saad Al Mousa
7	MF	FRA	N'Golo Kanté
8	MF	BRA	Fabinho
9	FW	FRA	Karim Benzema (captain)
10	MF	ALG	Houssem Aouar
12	DF	ALB	Mario Mitaj
13	DF	KSA	Muhannad Al-Shanqeeti
14	MF	KSA	Awad Al-Nashri
15	DF	KSA	Hassan Kadesh
19	FW	FRA	Moussa Diaby
20	DF	KSA	Ahmed Sharahili
21	FW	KSA	Saleh Al-Shehri

No.	Pos.	Nation	Player
22	MF	KSA	Abdulaziz Al-Bishi
23	MF	KSA	Nawaf Al-Jadaani ^{U19}
24	MF	KSA	Abdulrahman Al-Aboud
27	DF	KSA	Fawaz Al-Sqoor
30	MF	ESP	Unai Hernández
33	GK	KSA	Mohammed Al-Mahasneh
34	FW	NED	Steven Bergwijn
41	MF	KSA	Mohammed Fallatah ^{U19}
42	DF	KSA	Muath Faqeehi
47	GK	KSA	Hamed Al-Shanqiti ^{U19}
55	MF	ARG	Mateo Borrell ^{U19}
77	MF	KSA	Abdulelah Hawsawi
80	MF	KSA	Hamed Al-Ghamdi (on loan from Al-Ettifaq)
87	DF	KSA	Yaseen Al Jaber ^{U19}
88	GK	KSA	Osama Al-Mermesh

== Transfers and loans ==
=== Transfers in ===
Entry date	Position	No.	Player	From club	Fee	Ref.
30 June 2024	GK	41	(Saudi Arabia) Raghdan Matri	(Saudi Arabia) Al-Kholood	End of loan	
30 June 2024	GK	–	(Saudi Arabia) Saleh Al-Ohaymid	(Saudi Arabia) Al-Taawoun	End of loan	
30 June 2024	DF	–	(Saudi Arabia) Hassan Al-Asmari	(Saudi Arabia) Al-Batin	End of loan	
30 June 2024	DF	–	(Saudi Arabia) Basil Al-Hedaif	(Saudi Arabia) Jeddah	End of loan	
30 June 2024	DF	–	(Saudi Arabia) Abdulelah Al-Shehri	(Saudi Arabia) Mudhar	End of loan	
30 June 2024	MF	24	(Saudi Arabia) Abdulrahman Al-Aboud	(Saudi Arabia) Al-Ettifaq	End of loan	
30 June 2024	MF	–	(Saudi Arabia) Abdulaziz Al-Bishi	(Saudi Arabia) Damac	End of loan	
30 June 2024	MF	–	(Saudi Arabia) Hussain Al-Eisa	(Saudi Arabia) Al-Kholood	End of loan	
30 June 2024	MF	–	(Saudi Arabia) Omar Al-Jadani	(Saudi Arabia) Al-Ain	End of loan	
30 June 2024	MF	—	(Saudi Arabia) Abdulelah Hawsawi	(Saudi Arabia) Al-Khaleej	End of loan	
30 June 2024	MF	–	(Saudi Arabia) Al Mutasim Seddiq	(Saudi Arabia) Al-Kholood	End of loan	
30 June 2024	FW	70	(Saudi Arabia) Haroune Camara	(Saudi Arabia) Al-Ettifaq	End of loan	
30 June 2024	FW	–	(Saudi Arabia) Abdulaziz Al-Hassani	(Saudi Arabia) Al-Entesar	End of loan	
1 July 2024	GK	60	(Saudi Arabia) Hamed Al-Shanqiti	(Saudi Arabia) Al-Shabab	Free	
1 July 2024	DF	25	(Saudi Arabia) Saad Al Mousa	(Saudi Arabia) Al-Ettifaq	$5,320,000	
1 July 2024	MF	27	(Saudi Arabia) Ahmed Al-Ghamdi	(Saudi Arabia) Al-Ettifaq	$8,000,000	
16 July 2024	MF	10	(Algeria) Houssem Aouar	(Italy) Roma	$13,000,000	
21 July 2024	DF	42	(Saudi Arabia) Muath Faqeehi	(Saudi Arabia) Al-Hilal	$2,600,000	
22 July 2024	FW	21	(Saudi Arabia) Saleh Al-Shehri	(Saudi Arabia) Al-Hilal	Free	
24 July 2024	FW	19	(France) Moussa Diaby	(England) Aston Villa	$65,000,000	
5 August 2024	GK	1	(Serbia) Predrag Rajković	(Spain) Mallorca	$12,000,000	
30 August 2024	MF	–	(Venezuela) Bryant Ortega	(Venezuela) Caracas	Undisclosed	
2 September 2024	DF	2	(Portugal) Danilo Pereira	(France) Paris Saint-Germain	$5,600,000	
3 September 2024	MF	–	(Saudi Arabia) Abdulaziz Al-Humaidi	(Saudi Arabia) Al-Jabalain	Undisclosed	
3 September 2024	FW	34	(Netherlands) Steven Bergwijn	(Netherlands) Ajax	$23,300,000	
8 September 2024	FW	–	(Colombia) Ricardo Caraballo	(Colombia) Barranquilla	$500,000	
14 September 2024	DF	–	(Argentina) Isaías Rodríguez	(Argentina) Boca Juniors	Free	
30 January 2025	MF	–	(Spain) Unai Hernández	(Spain) Barcelona Atlètic	$4,700,000	
31 January 2025	DF	12	(Albania) Mario Mitaj	(Russia) Lokomotiv Moscow	$4,150,000	

=== Loans in ===
Start date	End date	Position	No.	Player	From club	Fee	Ref.
1 July 2024	End of season	MF	80	(Saudi Arabia) Hamed Al-Ghamdi	(Saudi Arabia) Al-Ettifaq	None	
1 September 2024	End of season	DF	–	(Saudi Arabia) Abdulelah Al-Amri	(Saudi Arabia) Al-Nassr	Undisclosed	
3 September 2024	30 January 2025	DF	12	(Albania) Mario Mitaj	(Russia) Lokomotiv Moscow	$1,300,000	

=== Transfers out ===
Exit date	Position	No.	Player	To club	Fee	Ref.
30 June 2024	DF	30	(Saudi Arabia) Saad Al Mousa	(Saudi Arabia) Al-Ettifaq	End of loan	
30 June 2024	MF	27	(Saudi Arabia) Ahmed Al-Ghamdi	(Saudi Arabia) Al-Ettifaq	End of loan	
30 June 2024	MF	80	(Saudi Arabia) Hamed Al-Ghamdi	(Saudi Arabia) Al-Ettifaq	End of loan	
1 July 2024	GK	34	(Brazil) Marcelo Grohe	(Saudi Arabia) Al-Kholood	Free	
1 July 2024	DF	4	(Saudi Arabia) Omar Hawsawi		Retired	
1 July 2024	FW	90	(Brazil) Romarinho	(Saudi Arabia) Neom	Free	
7 July 2024	DF	33	(Saudi Arabia) Madallah Al-Olayan	(Saudi Arabia) Al-Ettifaq	Free	
10 July 2024	DF	19	(Saudi Arabia) Turki Al-Jaadi	(Saudi Arabia) Al-Arabi	Free	
13 July 2024	DF	25	(Saudi Arabia) Suwailem Al-Menhali	(Saudi Arabia) Al-Riyadh	$164,000	
17 July 2024	FW	70	(Saudi Arabia) Haroune Camara	(Saudi Arabia) Al-Shabab	Free	
19 July 2024	MF	—	(Saudi Arabia) Hussain Al-Eisa	(Saudi Arabia) Al-Arabi	Free	
21 July 2024	DF	26	(Egypt) Ahmed Hegazi	(Saudi Arabia) Neom	Free	
23 July 2024	FW	99	(Morocco) Abderrazak Hamdallah	(Saudi Arabia) Al-Shabab	Free	
9 August 2024	DF	—	(Saudi Arabia) Basil Al-Hedaif	(Saudi Arabia) Jeddah	Free	
13 August 2024	DF	12	(Saudi Arabia) Zakaria Hawsawi	(Saudi Arabia) Al-Raed	Undisclosed	
16 August 2024	MF	—	(Saudi Arabia) Khalid Medad	(Saudi Arabia) Al-Ain	Free	
19 August 2024	GK	21	(Saudi Arabia) Abdullah Al-Jadaani	(Saudi Arabia) Abha	Free	
25 August 2024	GK	–	(Saudi Arabia) Saleh Al-Ohaymid	(Saudi Arabia) Al-Raed	Free	
30 August 2024	FW	11	(Portugal) Jota	(France) Rennes	$8,850,000	
1 September 2024	GK	1	(Saudi Arabia) Abdullah Al-Mayouf	(Saudi Arabia) Al-Shabab	Free	
2 September 2024	DF	–	(Saudi Arabia) Hassan Al-Asmari	(Saudi Arabia) Al-Kholood	Free	
10 September 2024	MF	–	(Saudi Arabia) Al Mutasim Seddiq	(Saudi Arabia) Al-Ain	Free	
13 September 2024	FW	–	(Saudi Arabia) Baraa Softah	(Saudi Arabia) Al-Safa	Free	
7 January 2025	DF	5	(Italy) Luiz Felipe	(France) Marseille	Free	

=== Loans out ===
Start date	End date	Position	No.	Player	To club	Fee	Ref.
17 July 2024	End of season	MF	6	(Saudi Arabia) Sultan Al-Farhan	(Saudi Arabia) Al-Taawoun	None	
28 July 2024	End of season	GK	41	(Saudi Arabia) Raghdan Matri	(Saudi Arabia) Al-Rayyan	None	
13 August 2024	End of season	MF	77	(Saudi Arabia) Saleh Al-Amri	(Saudi Arabia) Al-Raed	None	
23 August 2024	End of season	MF	22	(Saudi Arabia) Hammam Al-Hammami	(Saudi Arabia) Al-Kholood	None	
30 August 2024	End of season	MF	–	(Venezuela) Bryant Ortega	(Saudi Arabia) Jeddah	None	
31 August 2024	End of season	MF	29	(Saudi Arabia) Farhah Al-Shamrani	(Saudi Arabia) Al-Kholood	None	
1 September 2024	End of season	MF	16	(Saudi Arabia) Faisal Al-Ghamdi	(Belgium) Beerschot	None	
1 September 2024	End of season	MF	17	(Saudi Arabia) Marwan Al-Sahafi	(Belgium) Beerschot	None	
8 September 2024	End of season	FW	–	(Colombia) Ricardo Caraballo	(Saudi Arabia) Jeddah	None	
11 September 2024	End of season	DF	–	(Saudi Arabia) Abdulrahman Al-Obaid	(Saudi Arabia) Al-Najma	None	
12 September 2024	End of season	DF	–	(Saudi Arabia) Abdullah Al-Rashidi	(Saudi Arabia) Al-Batin	None	
14 September 2024	End of season	DF	–	(Argentina) Isaías Rodríguez	(Saudi Arabia) Jeddah	None	
8 January 2025	End of season	FW	90	(Saudi Arabia) Talal Haji	(Saudi Arabia) Al-Riyadh	None	
12 January 2025	End of season	DF	28	(Saudi Arabia) Ahmed Bamsaud	(Saudi Arabia) Al-Ettifaq	None	
30 January 2025	End of season	MF	11	(Saudi Arabia) Ahmed Al-Ghamdi	(Saudi Arabia) Neom	None	

== Pre-season ==
20 July 2024 Friendly	Al-Ittihad (Saudi Arabia)	0–2	(Spain) Elche	La Nucia, Spain
19:00 CEST		Report	Plano 22'; Barzic 54'	Stadium: Estadi Olímpic Camilo Cano

26 July 2024 Friendly	Al-Ittihad (Saudi Arabia)	0–1	(Spain) Sevilla	Seville, Spain
22:00 CEST		Report	Ocampos 42' (pen.)	Stadium: Ramón Sánchez Pizjuán; Attendance: 21,475

31 July 2024 Friendly	Al-Ittihad (Saudi Arabia)	1–3	(Portugal) Farense	Faro, Portugal
20:00 WEST	Benzema 12'	Report	Poveda 49' (pen.); Tomané 57'; Matias 81'	Stadium: Estádio de São Luís

3 August 2024 Friendly	Al-Ittihad (Saudi Arabia)	1–4	(Spain) Real Betis	Seville, Spain
CEST	Diaby 41'	Report	Ruibal 24'; Fekir 45+1'; Roca 59'; Juanmi 72'	Stadium: Estadio Benito Villamarín; Attendance: 24,652

7 August 2024 Friendly	Al-Ittihad (Saudi Arabia)	2–0	(Italy) Inter Milan	Monza, Italy
20:30 CEST	Diaby 25', 47'	Report		Stadium: Stadio Brianteo

16 August 2024 Friendly	Al-Ittihad (Saudi Arabia)	1–1	(Saudi Arabia) Al-Qadsiah	Jeddah, Saudi Arabia
21:30 AST	Diaby 35'	Report	Aubameyang 72'	Stadium: Prince Abdullah Al-Faisal Sports City

== Competitions ==
=== Overview ===
Competition	First match	Last match	Starting round	Final position	Record							
Competition	First match	Last match	Starting round	Final position	Pld	W	D	L	GF	GA	GD	Win %
Pro League	24 August 2024	26 May 2025	Matchday 1	Winners	34	26	5	3	79	35	+44	76.47
King's Cup	24 September 2024	30 May 2025	Round of 16	Winners	5	4	1	0	13	5	+8	80.00
Total					39	30	6	3	92	40	+52	76.92

Source: Soccerway

=== Pro League ===
==== League table ====
Pos	Team	Pld	W	D	L	GF	GA	GD	Pts	Qualification or relegation
1	Al-Ittihad (C)	34	26	5	3	79	35	+44	83	Qualification for AFC Champions League Elite League stage
2	Al-Hilal	34	23	6	5	95	41	+54	75	Qualification for AFC Champions League Elite League stage
3	Al-Nassr	34	21	7	6	80	38	+42	70	Qualification for AFC Champions League Two group stage (Note: Since the winners of the 2024–25 King's Cup, Al-Ittihad, had already qualified for the Champions League Elite, the spot given to the King's Cup winners (Champions League Two) was passed to the third-placed team.)
4	Al-Qadsiah	34	21	5	8	53	31	+22	68	
5	Al-Ahli	34	21	4	9	69	36	+33	67	Qualification for AFC Champions League Elite League stage (Note: By virtue of winning 2024–25 AFC Champions League Elite.)

Source: SPL
Rules for classification: 1) Points; 2) Head-to-head points; 3) Head-to-head goal difference; 4) Total goal difference; 5) Total goals scored; 6) Fair-play points
(Note: Head-to-head record is used only after all the matches between the teams in question have been played).
(C) Champions

==== Results summary ====
Overall								Home						Away					
Pld	W	D	L	GF	GA	GD	Pts	W	D	L	GF	GA	GD	W	D	L	GF	GA	GD
34	26	5	3	79	35	+44	83	16	1	0	47	15	+32	10	4	3	32	20	+12

Source: Saudi Pro League

==== Results by round ====
Round	1	2	3	4	5	6	7	8	9	10	11	12	13	14	15	16	17	18	19	20	21	22	23	24	25	26	27	28	29	30	31	32	33	34
Ground	A	H	H	A	H	A	H	A	H	A	H	A	H	A	H	H	A	H	A	A	H	A	H	A	H	A	H	A	H	A	H	A	A	H
Result	W	W	W	L	W	W	W	W	W	W	W	W	W	D	W	W	L	W	W	W	W	D	D	D	W	D	W	L	W	W	W	W	W	W
Position	5	3	1	2	2	2	2	2	2	2	1	1	1	2	2	2	2	2	1	1	1	1	1	1	1	1	1	1	1	1	1	1	1	1

Source: Saudi Pro League
A = Away; H = Home; W = Win; D = Draw; L = Loss

==== Matches ====
All times are local, AST (UTC+3).

Win Draw Loss Postponed

24 August 2024 1	Al-Kholood	0–1	Al-Ittihad	Buraidah
19:10	Dieng (yellow card) 73'	Report	Kadesh (yellow card) 60'; Aouar 90+4'	Stadium: King Abdullah Sports City; Attendance: 2,296; Referee: Faisal Al-Blwi

29 August 2024 2	Al-Ittihad	2–1	Al-Taawoun	Jeddah
21:00	Al-Sqoor (yellow card) 14'; Diaby (yellow card) 25'; Benzema 70'; Aouar 90+8' (pen.), (yellow card) 90+9'	Report	Al-Jumayah (yellow card) 34'; Barrow 59'; Al-Saluli (yellow card) 66' (yellow-red card) 90+5'; Al-Mufarrij (yellow card) 90+7'; El Mahdioui (yellow card) 90+9'	Stadium: King Abdullah Sports City; Attendance: 26,977; Referee: Ivan Kružliak (Slovakia)

15 September 2024 3	Al-Ittihad	7–1	Al-Wehda	Jeddah
21:00	Benzema 2', 46', 89'; Aouar 13'; Kanté (yellow card) 30'; Fabinho 45+4'; Al-Sqoor 55'; Al-Shehri 87'	Report	Crețu (yellow card) 27'; Amyn 31'	Stadium: King Abdullah Sports City; Attendance: 49,712; Referee: Sami Al-Jires

21 September 2024 4	Al-Hilal	3–1	Al-Ittihad	Riyadh
21:00	Mitrović 3', 14' (pen.); S. Al-Dawsari 37'; Malcom (yellow card) 45+1'	Report	Kanté (yellow card) 11'; Pereira (yellow card) 17'; Benzema 86'	Stadium: Prince Faisal bin Fahd Sports City; Attendance: 15,666; Referee: Sandro Schärer (Switzerland)

27 September 2024 5	Al-Ittihad	4–1	Al-Khaleej	Jeddah
21:00	Kadesh (yellow card) 43'; Benzema 49'; Aouar (yellow card) 53', (goal) 56'; Bergwijn 68'; H. Al-Ghamdi 90+5'	Report	Narey 5'	Stadium: King Abdullah Sports City; Attendance: 27,483; Referee: Majed Al-Shamrani

3 October 2024 6	Al-Okhdood	1–2	Al-Ittihad	Najran
21:00	Koné (yellow card) 81'; Al Abbas (yellow card) 88', (goal) 90+5'; Vítor (yellow card) 90+10'	Report	Benzema 50'; Fabinho (yellow card) 52'; Diaby (yellow card) 83'; Aouar 89'; Al-Shehri (yellow card) 90+7'	Stadium: Prince Hathloul bin Abdulaziz Sports City; Attendance: 4,096; Referee: Mohammed Al-Ismail

19 October 2024 7	Al-Ittihad	3–1	Al-Qadsiah	Jeddah
21:00	Benzema 7'; Fabinho (yellow card) 37'; Diaby 67'; Mitaj 81'	Report	Aubameyang 20'; Aboulshamat (yellow card) 38'	Stadium: King Abdullah Sports City; Attendance: 35,654; Referee: Sergei Karasev (Russia)

24 October 2024 8	Al-Riyadh	0–1	Al-Ittihad	Riyadh
21:00	Al-Sahafi (red card) 28'; Al-Khaibari (yellow card) 45+1'; Assiri (yellow card) 66'	Report	Kanté 45+2'; Mitaj (yellow card) 48'; Aouar (yellow card) 69'; Al-Amri (yellow card) 84'	Stadium: Prince Faisal bin Fahd Sports City; Attendance: 7,853; Referee: Sami Al-Jires

31 October 2024 9	Al-Ittihad	1–0	Al-Ahli	Jeddah
21:00	Al-Shehri 42'; Al-Amri (yellow card) 50'	Report	Al-Asmari (yellow card) 64'; Ibañez (yellow card) 90+2'; Kessié (yellow card) 90+4'	Stadium: King Abdullah Sports City; Attendance: 52,546; Referee: Jesús Valenzuela (Venezuela)

7 November 2024 10	Al-Orobah	0–2	Al-Ittihad	Sakakah
20:00		Report	Al-Shehri 25'; Bergwijn 52' (pen.); Al-Ghamdi (yellow card) 84'	Stadium: Al Jouf University Stadium; Attendance: 4,688; Referee: Khalid Al-Teris

24 November 2024 11	Al-Ittihad	2–0	Al-Fateh	Jeddah
20:00	Hawsawi (yellow card) 32'; Fabinho 58'; Aouar 90'	Report	Al-Fuhaid (yellow card) 30'; Al-Mousa (yellow card) 37'; Al-Anazi (yellow card) 85'	Stadium: Prince Abdullah Al-Faisal Sports City; Attendance: 13,823; Referee: Sultan Al-Harbi

30 November 2024 12	Al-Ettifaq	0–4	Al-Ittihad	Dammam
17:25	Al-Malki (yellow card) 3'; Al-Olayan (yellow card) 43'; Al-Khateeb (yellow card) 54'	Report	Mitaj (yellow card) 17'; Kanté 35'; Benzema 53'; Aouar 66'; Bergwijn 70'; Fabinho (yellow card) 78'	Stadium: EGO Stadium; Attendance: 11,008; Referee: Sami Al-Jires

6 December 2024 13	Al-Ittihad	2–1	Al-Nassr	Jeddah
20:00	Benzema 55', (yellow card) 67'; Pereira (yellow card) 59'; Bergwijn (yellow card) 64', (goal) 90+1'	Report	Brozović (yellow card) 24'; Al-Ghannam (yellow card) 42'; Ronaldo 57'; Otávio (yellow card) 67'	Stadium: King Abdullah Sports City; Attendance: 55,120; Referee: Facundo Tello (Argentina)

11 January 2025 14	Al-Fayha	1–1	Al-Ittihad	Buraidah
20:00	López (yellow card) 16'; Abdi (yellow card) 32'; Shukurov (yellow card) 48'; Sakala 90+1'	Report	Al-Nashri (yellow card) 20'; Al-Sqoor 90+3'	Stadium: King Abdullah Sports City; Attendance: 2,878; Referee: Khalid Al-Teris

16 January 2025 15	Al-Ittihad	4–1	Al-Raed	Jeddah
20:00	Benzema 21'; Hawsawi (yellow card) 35'; Aouar (yellow card) 43', (goal) 77'; Bergwijn 45+7'; Rajković (yellow card) 59'; Al-Aboud 71'	Report	N. Hazazi (yellow card) 49', (goal) 58'; Al-Amri (yellow card) 66'	Stadium: Prince Abdullah Al-Faisal Sports City; Attendance: 14,154; Referee: Sami Al-Jires

22 January 2025 16	Al-Ittihad	2–1	Al-Shabab	Jeddah
20:00	Pereira (yellow card) 17'; Al-Aboud 32'; Al-Shanqeeti (yellow card) 35'; Benzema 45+3'	Report	Camara 45+5'; Hoedt (yellow card) 60'; Al-Thani (yellow card) 84'	Stadium: King Abdullah Sports City; Attendance: 41,704; Referee: Urs Schnyder (Switzerland)

27 January 2025 17	Damac	2–1	Al-Ittihad	Abha
17:05	Nkoudou 17', 90+4', (yellow card) 87'; Al-Anazi (yellow card) 43'; Bedrane (yellow card) 79'; Niță (yellow card) 90+1'; Solan (yellow card) 90+3'	Report	Al-Aboud (yellow card) 34'; Benzema 45+4'; Aouar (yellow card) 76'	Stadium: Prince Sultan bin Abdulaziz Sports City; Attendance: 14,973; Referee: Faisal Al-Blwi

1 February 2025 18	Al-Ittihad	4–3	Al-Kholood	Jeddah
20:00	Al-Aboud 35', (yellow card) 76'; Bergwijn 45+9' (pen.), 63', (yellow card) 67'; Kadesh 47'; Kanté (yellow card) 81'	Report	Troost-Ekong 15'; Maolida 23', 90+2'; Al-Shamrani (yellow card) 37'	Stadium: Prince Abdullah Al-Faisal Sports City; Attendance: 13,847; Referee: Majed Al-Shamrani

6 February 2025 19	Al-Taawoun	1–2	Al-Ittihad	Buraidah
20:00	Al-Ahmed (yellow card) 31'; Barrow 45+10'; Mahzari (yellow card) 61'; Sabiri (yellow card) 90+4'	Report	Al-Aboud 21', (yellow card) 59'; Benzema 90+5'	Stadium: King Abdullah Sports City; Attendance: 8,886; Referee: Sergey Ivanov (Russia)

15 February 2025 20	Al-Wehda	1–4	Al-Ittihad	Mecca
20:00	El Yamiq 42'; Al Makahasi (yellow card) 72'	Report	Al-Shanqeeti 35'; Benzema 45'; Bergwijn 60'; Aouar 90+5'	Stadium: King Abdulaziz Sports City; Attendance: 16,275; Referee: Sebastián Zunino (Argentina)

22 February 2025 21	Al-Ittihad	4–1	Al-Hilal	Jeddah
20:30	Kadesh 29', (yellow card) 69'; Bergwijn (yellow card) 36', (goal) 45', 51'; Al Mousa (yellow card) 63'; Benzema 86'	Report	Leonardo 23', (yellow card) 90+8'; Cancelo (yellow card) 78'; Al-Hamdan (yellow card) 90+2'	Stadium: Alinma Stadium; Attendance: 52,870; Referee: Daniel Siebert (Germany)

26 February 2025 22	Al-Khaleej	1–1	Al-Ittihad	Dammam
20:00	Al Hamsal (yellow card) 45+2'; Al-Samiri (yellow card) 89'; Fortounis 90+6' (pen.)	Report	Al-Aboud 78'	Stadium: Prince Mohamed bin Fahd Stadium; Attendance: 17,150; Referee: Andris Treimanis (Latvia)

2 March 2025 23	Al-Ittihad	1–1	Al-Okhdood	Jeddah
22:00	Aouar 39'	Report	Godwin (yellow card) 29'; Petros (yellow card) 56'; Asiri (yellow card) 75'; Bassogog 90+7'	Stadium: Alinma Stadium; Attendance: 45,772; Referee: Jesús Valenzuela (Venezuela)

6 March 2025 24	Al-Qadsiah	1–1	Al-Ittihad	Dammam
22:00	Aubameyang 90+1'	Report	Faqeehi (yellow card) 21'; Fabinho (yellow card) 59'; Kanté (yellow card) 90+6', (goal) 90+6'	Stadium: Prince Mohamed bin Fahd Stadium; Attendance: 20,115; Referee: Esteban Ostojich (Uruguay)

13 March 2025 25	Al-Ittihad	2–1	Al-Riyadh	Jeddah
22:00	Diaby 55'; Al-Nashri (yellow card) 69'; Al-Shehri 90+11' (pen.)	Report	Bayesh 81'; Haji (yellow card) 83'; Tambakti (yellow card) 90+3'; Assiri (yellow card) 90+9'	Stadium: Prince Abdullah Al-Faisal Sports City; Attendance: 18,720; Referee: Igor Pajač (Croatia)

5 April 2025 26	Al-Ahli	2–2	Al-Ittihad	Jeddah
21:00	Ibañez (yellow card) 14', (goal) 51'; Galeno (yellow card) 44'; Toney (yellow card) 45+2', (goal) 82'; Veiga (yellow card) 90+6'	Report	Fabinho (yellow card) 72'; Diaby 74'; Al-Shehri (yellow card) 81'; Benzema 90+4'	Stadium: Alinma Stadium; Attendance: 45,507; Referee: Sergey Ivanov (Russia)

10 April 2025 27	Al-Ittihad	2–0	Al-Orobah	Jeddah
21:00	Kanté (yellow card) 25'; Hernández 45+7', (yellow card) 50'; Diaby (yellow card) 87'; Al-Aboud 88'	Report	Tello (yellow card) 45+9'; Al-Torais (yellow card) 60'; R. Al-Ruwaili (yellow card) 66'	Stadium: Alinma Stadium; Attendance: 47,967; Referee: Anastasios Sidiropoulos (Greece)

17 April 2025 28	Al-Fateh	2–0	Al-Ittihad	Al-Ahsa
21:00	Sbaï 10'; Saâdane (yellow card) 43'; Vargas 69'; Youssouf (yellow card) 90'	Report	Al-Amri (yellow card) 71'	Stadium: Al-Fateh Club Stadium; Attendance: 11,278; Referee: Facundo Tello (Argentina)

21 April 2025 29	Al-Ittihad	3–2	Al-Ettifaq	Jeddah
21:00	Pereira 11'; Al Mousa (yellow card) 30'; Benzema 35'; Aouar 45+2'; Fabinho (yellow card) 58'; Al-Sqoor (yellow card) 88'	Report	Vitinho 5'; Pereira 83' (o.g.); Al-Aliwa (yellow card) 90+3'	Stadium: Prince Abdullah Al-Faisal Sports City; Attendance: 17,743; Referee: Georgi Kabakov (Bulgaria)

7 May 2025 30	Al-Nassr	2–3	Al-Ittihad	Riyadh
21:00	Mané 3'; Yahya 37'; Al-Hassan (yellow card) 61'; Al-Khaibari (yellow card) 90+7'	Report	Benzema 49'; Kanté 52'; Pereira (yellow card) 67'; Fabinho (yellow card) 90+3'; Al-Amri (yellow card) 90+3'; Bergwijn (yellow card) 90+7'; Diaby (red card) 90+7'	Stadium: Al-Awwal Park; Attendance: 24,575; Referee: Danny Makkelie (Netherlands)

11 May 2025 31	Al-Ittihad	3–0	Al-Fayha	Jeddah
21:00	Benzema 24', 54'; Al-Baqawi 75' (o.g.)	Report	Al-Harajin (yellow card) 90+1'	Stadium: Prince Abdullah Al-Faisal Sports City; Attendance: 22,117; Referee: Nikola Dabanović (Montenegro)

15 May 2025 32	Al-Raed	1–3	Al-Ittihad	Buraidah
21:00	Gonzalez 9'; A. Hazazi (yellow card) 38'; Abeid (yellow card) 74'	Report	Bergwijn 21'; Pereira 40'; Al-Aboud 47'; Fabinho (yellow card) 68'; Al-Bishi (yellow card) 81'	Stadium: King Abdullah Sports City; Attendance: 18,796; Referee: Rade Obrenovič (Slovenia)

20 May 2025 33	Al-Shabab	2–3	Al-Ittihad	Riyadh
21:00	Carrasco 45+3'; Guanca 67'; Al-Shuwayrikh (yellow card) 90+1'; Podence (yellow card) 90+5'	Report	Diaby 1', 34', (yellow card) 90'; Bergwijn 58'; Fallatah (yellow card) 86'	Stadium: Al-Shabab Club Stadium; Attendance: 11,557; Referee: João Pinheiro (Portugal)

26 May 2025 34	Al-Ittihad	1–0	Damac	Jeddah
21:00	Bergwijn 72'	Report	Al-Sibyani (yellow card) 89'	Stadium: Alinma Stadium; Attendance: 58,117; Referee: Majed Al-Shamrani

=== King's Cup ===
All times are local, AST (UTC+3).

24 September 2024 Round of 32	Al-Ittihad	3–0	Al-Ain	Jeddah
21:00	Al-Shehri 25', 65' (pen.); Al-Refaei 29' (o.g.)	Report	Ibrahim (yellow card) 49'; Al-Nakhli (yellow card) 82'	Stadium: Prince Abdullah Al-Faisal Sports City; Attendance: 8,049; Referee: Mohammed Al-Harbi

28 October 2024 Round of 16	Al-Ittihad	2–0	Al-Jandal	Jeddah
20:30	Al-Bishi 4'; Al-Aboud 45'	Report		Stadium: Prince Abdullah Al-Faisal Sports City; Attendance: 15,178; Referee: Abdullah Al-Harbi

7 January 2025 Quarter-finals	Al-Hilal	2–2 (a.e.t.) (1–3 p)	Al-Ittihad	Riyadh
20:30	Neves (yellow card) 34'; Koulibaly (yellow card) 54'; Al-Dawsari 72'; Leonardo 101'	Report	Mitaj (yellow card) 32'; Kanté (yellow card) 51'; Benzema 63', 114'; Aouar (yellow card) 65'	Stadium: Kingdom Arena; Attendance: 25,129; Referee: Jesús Valenzuela (Venezuela)
	Penalties
	Kanno (penalty missed); Leonardo (penalty missed); Milinković-Savić (penalty scored); Malcom (penalty missed)		(penalty scored) Benzema; (penalty scored) Fabinho; (penalty scored) Pereira

1 April 2025 Semi-finals	Al-Ittihad	3–2	Al-Shabab	Jeddah
21:00	Fabinho 14' (pen.); Benzema (yellow card) 36'; Pereira 90+2', 90+9', (yellow card) 90+10'; Rajković (yellow card) 90+15'	Report	Al-Shuwayrikh (yellow card) 39'; Guanca 64', 67'	Stadium: Alinma Stadium; Attendance: 46,594; Referee: Sascha Stegemann (Germany)

30 May 2025 Final	Al-Ittihad	3–1	Al-Qadsiah	Jeddah
21:00	Benzema 34', 90+4'; Aouar 43'	Report	Aubameyang 45+6' (pen.); Fernández (yellow card) 65' (yellow-red card) 81'	Stadium: Alinma Stadium; Attendance: 51,331; Referee: Maurizio Mariani (Italy)

== Statistics ==
=== Appearances ===
Last updated on 30 May 2025.

No.	Pos	Nat	Player	Total		Pro League		King's Cup	
No.	Pos	Nat	Player	Apps	Goals	Apps	Goals	Apps	Goals
Goalkeepers
1	GK	(Serbia) SRB	Predrag Rajković	33	0	28	0	5	0
33	GK	(Saudi Arabia) KSA	Mohammed Al-Mahasneh	5	0	5	0	0	0
47	GK	(Saudi Arabia) KSA	Hamed Al-Shanqiti	3	0	1+2	0	0	0
88	GK	(Saudi Arabia) KSA	Osama Al-Mermesh	0	0	0	0	0	0
Defenders
2	DF	(Portugal) POR	Danilo Pereira	29	4	25+1	2	3	2
4	DF	(Saudi Arabia) KSA	Abdulelah Al-Amri	21	0	14+6	0	1	0
6	DF	(Saudi Arabia) KSA	Saad Al Mousa	27	0	19+4	0	3+1	0
12	DF	(Albania) ALB	Mario Mitaj	22	1	17+1	1	4	0
13	DF	(Saudi Arabia) KSA	Muhannad Al-Shanqeeti	32	1	24+4	1	4	0
15	DF	(Saudi Arabia) KSA	Hassan Kadesh	33	2	26+5	2	2	0
20	DF	(Saudi Arabia) KSA	Ahmed Sharahili	1	0	0+1	0	0	0
27	DF	(Saudi Arabia) KSA	Fawaz Al-Sqoor	27	2	11+13	2	1+2	0
42	DF	(Saudi Arabia) KSA	Muath Faqeehi	10	0	1+7	0	2	0
87	DF	(Saudi Arabia) KSA	Yaseen Al-Jaber	0	0	0	0	0	0
Midfielders
7	MF	(France) FRA	N'Golo Kanté	35	4	31	4	4	0
8	MF	(Brazil) BRA	Fabinho	37	3	32	2	5	1
10	MF	(Algeria) ALG	Houssem Aouar	34	13	30	12	2+2	1
14	MF	(Saudi Arabia) KSA	Awad Al-Nashri	9	0	3+5	0	0+1	0
22	MF	(Saudi Arabia) KSA	Abdulaziz Al-Bishi	16	1	1+11	0	2+2	1
24	MF	(Saudi Arabia) KSA	Abdulrahman Al-Aboud	34	8	12+17	7	3+2	1
30	MF	(Spain) ESP	Unai Hernández	9	1	7+2	1	0	0
41	MF	(Saudi Arabia) KSA	Mohammed Fallatah	1	0	0+1	0	0	0
55	MF	(Argentina) ARG	Mateo Borrell	0	0	0	0	0	0
77	MF	(Saudi Arabia) KSA	Abdulelah Hawsawi	15	0	4+8	0	2+1	0
80	MF	(Saudi Arabia) KSA	Hamed Al-Ghamdi	21	1	3+14	1	3+1	0
Forwards
9	FW	(France) FRA	Karim Benzema	33	25	29	21	3+1	4
19	FW	(France) FRA	Moussa Diaby	28	5	22+2	5	2+2	0
21	FW	(Saudi Arabia) KSA	Saleh Al-Shehri	22	6	3+15	4	2+2	2
23	FW	(Saudi Arabia) KSA	Nawaf Al-Jadaani	0	0	0	0	0	0
34	FW	(Netherlands) NED	Steven Bergwijn	29	13	24+1	13	2+2	0
Players sent out on loan this season
11	MF	(Saudi Arabia) KSA	Ahmed Al-Ghamdi	4	0	1+1	0	0+2	0
Player who made an appearance this season but have left the club
5	DF	(Italy) ITA	Luiz Felipe	1	0	1	0	0	0

=== Goalscorers ===
Rank	No.	Pos	Nat	Name	Pro League	King's Cup	Total
1	9	FW	(France)	Karim Benzema	21	4	25
2	10	MF	(Algeria)	Houssem Aouar	12	1	13
2	34	FW	(Netherlands)	Steven Bergwijn	13	0	13
4	24	MF	(Saudi Arabia)	Abdulrahman Al-Aboud	7	1	8
5	21	FW	(Saudi Arabia)	Saleh Al-Shehri	4	2	6
6	19	FW	(France)	Moussa Diaby	5	0	5
7	2	DF	(Portugal)	Danilo Pereira	2	2	4
7	7	MF	(France)	N'Golo Kanté	4	0	4
9	8	MF	(Brazil)	Fabinho	2	1	3
10	15	DF	(Saudi Arabia)	Hassan Kadesh	2	0	2
10	27	DF	(Saudi Arabia)	Fawaz Al-Sqoor	2	0	2
11	12	DF	(Albania)	Mario Mitaj	1	0	1
11	13	DF	(Saudi Arabia)	Muhannad Al-Shanqeeti	1	0	1
11	22	MF	(Saudi Arabia)	Abdulaziz Al-Bishi	0	1	1
11	30	MF	(Spain)	Unai Hernández	1	0	1
11	80	MF	(Saudi Arabia)	Hamed Al-Ghamdi	1	0	1
Own goal					1	1	2
Total					79	13	92

Last Updated: 30 May 2025

=== Assists ===
Rank	No.	Pos	Nat	Name	Pro League	King's Cup	Total
1	19	FW	(France)	Moussa Diaby	14	1	15
2	9	FW	(France)	Karim Benzema	9	0	9
3	24	MF	(Saudi Arabia)	Abdulrahman Al-Aboud	7	1	8
3	34	FW	(Netherlands)	Steven Bergwijn	7	1	8
5	13	DF	(Saudi Arabia)	Muhannad Al-Shanqeeti	5	1	6
6	7	MF	(France)	N'Golo Kanté	3	1	4
6	10	MF	(Algeria)	Houssem Aouar	4	0	4
8	30	MF	(Spain)	Unai Hernández	3	0	3
9	12	DF	(Albania)	Mario Mitaj	2	0	2
9	27	DF	(Saudi Arabia)	Fawaz Al-Sqoor	2	0	2
9	42	DF	(Saudi Arabia)	Muath Faqeehi	1	1	2
12	4	DF	(Saudi Arabia)	Abdulelah Al-Amri	1	0	1
12	8	MF	(Brazil)	Fabinho	1	0	1
12	15	DF	(Saudi Arabia)	Hassan Kadesh	1	0	1
12	21	FW	(Saudi Arabia)	Saleh Al-Shehri	1	0	1
12	22	MF	(Saudi Arabia)	Abdulaziz Al-Bishi	0	1	1
12	77	MF	(Saudi Arabia)	Abdulelah Hawsawi	0	1	1
12	80	MF	(Saudi Arabia)	Hamed Al-Ghamdi	1	0	1
Total					62	8	70

Last Updated: 30 May 2025

=== Clean sheets ===
Rank	No.	Pos	Nat	Name	Pro League	King's Cup	Total
1	1	GK	(Serbia)	Predrag Rajković	7	2	9
2	33	GK	(Saudi Arabia)	Mohammed Al-Mahasneh	2	0	2
Total					9	2	11

Last Updated: 26 May 2025
