= Unai Hernández =

Spanish footballer (born 2004)

Personal information
- Full name: Unai Hernández Lorenzo
- Date of birth: 14 December 2004 (age 21)
- Place of birth: Badalona, Spain
- Height: 1.71 m (5 ft 7 in)
- Position: Midfielder

Team information
- Current team: Girona (on loan from Al-Ittihad)

Youth career
- 2018–2022: Girona
- 2022–2023: Barcelona

Senior career*
Years	Team	Apps	(Gls)
2021–2022	Girona B	16	(0)
2023–2025	Barcelona B	55	(16)
2025–	Al-Ittihad	9	(1)
2025–2026	→ Al-Shabab (loan)	19	(0)
2026–	→ Girona (loan)	5	(1)
- * Club domestic league appearances and goals as of 20:30, 24 October 2026 (UTC)

Unai Hernández Lorenzo (born 14 December 2004) is a Spanish professional footballer who plays as a midfielder for Girona FC, on loan from Saudi club Al-Ittihad Club.

== Career ==
Born in Badalona, Barcelona, Catalonia, Hernández began his career with Girona FC, and made his senior debut with the reserves in the 2021–22 season, in Tercera División RFEF. On 23 July 2022, he signed for FC Barcelona and returned to the youth setup.

Hernández first appeared with Barcelona Atlètic on 21 January 2023, playing the last 24 minutes of a 1–0 Primera Federación away win over CD Calahorra. He subsequently became a regular starter for the B-team, before transferring to Saudi Pro League side Al-Ittihad Club on 31 January 2025.

On 9 September 2025, Hernández joined Al-Shabab FC on a one-year loan deal. On 14 August of the following year, he returned to Girona also in a temporary deal, being assigned to the first team in Segunda División.

== Style of play ==
Hernández has been described as "handles himself very well when he has to move to the left side, with very quick and different changes of pace".

== Personal life ==
Hernández is the older brother of Unax Hernández. He is the son of Josep Hernández and Raquel Lorenzo.

== Career statistics ==
=== Club ===
As of match played 24 october 2026

Appearances and goals by club, season and competition
Club	Season	League			National cup (Note: Includes King's Cup)		Other		Total	
Club	Season	Division	Apps	Goals	Apps	Goals	Apps	Goals	Apps	Goals
Girona B	2021–22	Tercera División RFEF	16	0	–		1 (Note: Appearance in 2022 Tercera División RFEF play-offs)	0	17	0
Barcelona Atlètic	2022–23	Primera Federación	1	0	–		0	0	1	0
Barcelona Atlètic	2023–24	Primera Federación	34	7	–		4 (Note: Appearances in 2024 Primera Federación play-offs)	3	38	10
Barcelona Atlètic	2024–25	Primera Federación	20	9	–		–		20	9
Barcelona Atlètic	Total		55	16	0	0	4	3	59	19
Al-Ittihad	2024–25	Saudi Pro League	9	1	0	0	–		9	1
Al-Ittihad	2025–26	Saudi Pro League	0	0	0	0	1 (Note: Appearance(s) in Saudi Super Cup)	0	1	0
Al-Ittihad	Total		9	1	0	0	1	0	10	1
Al-Shabab (loan)	2025–26	Saudi Pro League	19	0	2	0	–		21	0
Girona (loan)	2026–27	Segunda División	5	1	0	0	–		5	1
Career total			104	18	2	0	6	3	112	21

== Honours ==
Al-Ittihad

- Saudi Pro League: 2024–25
- King's Cup: 2024–25
