= Houssem Aouar =

Algeria international footballer (born 1998)

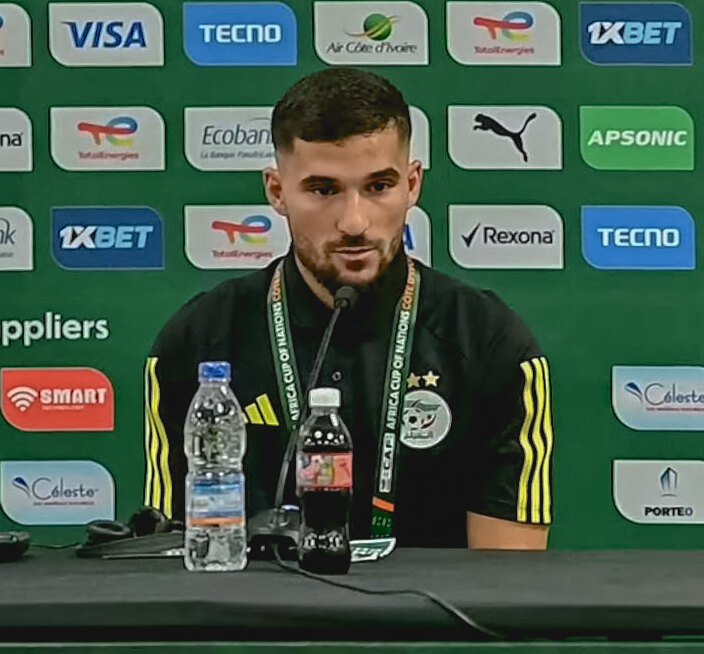
- Aouar in a press conference with Algeria in 2024

Personal information
- Full name: Houssem-Eddine Chaâbane Aouar
- Date of birth: 30 June 1998 (age 28)
- Place of birth: Lyon, France
- Height: 1.75 m (5 ft 9 in)
- Position: Midfielder

Team information
- Current team: Al-Ittihad
- Number: 10

Youth career
- 2006–2009: AC Villeurbanne
- 2009–2016: Lyon

Senior career*
Years	Team	Apps	(Gls)
2015–2017	Lyon B	22	(4)
2016–2023	Lyon	179	(30)
2023–2024	Roma	16	(4)
2024–	Al-Ittihad	63	(22)

International career^{‡}
2014	France U17	1	(0)
2017–2021	France U21	17	(4)
2020	France	1	(0)
2023–	Algeria	25	(6)
- * Club domestic league appearances and goals as of 15:58, 30 October 2026 (UTC) ‡ National team caps and goals as of 2 July 2026

Houssem-Eddine Chaâbane Aouar (Arabic: حُسَام الدِّين شَعْبَان عَوَار; born 30 June 1998) is a professional footballer who plays as a midfielder for Saudi Pro League club Al-Ittihad. Born in France, he plays for the Algeria national team.

Graduating from the youth setup of Lyon, Aouar spent his professional career at the club for seven seasons before he joined the Italian club Roma in 2023. After playing one season with the Italian club, he joined the Saudi Arabian club Al-Ittihad in 2024.

Aouar is a former youth international for France. He made one appearance for the country at senior level before switching his allegiance to Algeria in 2023. He represented the latter country at the 2023 Africa Cup of Nations and 2026 FIFA World Cup.

== Early life ==
Houssem-Eddine Chaâbane Aouar was born on 30 June 1998 in Lyon, Auvergne-Rhône-Alpes, to parents from Béni Saf in Algeria. He grew up in Villeurbane.

== Club career ==
=== Lyon ===
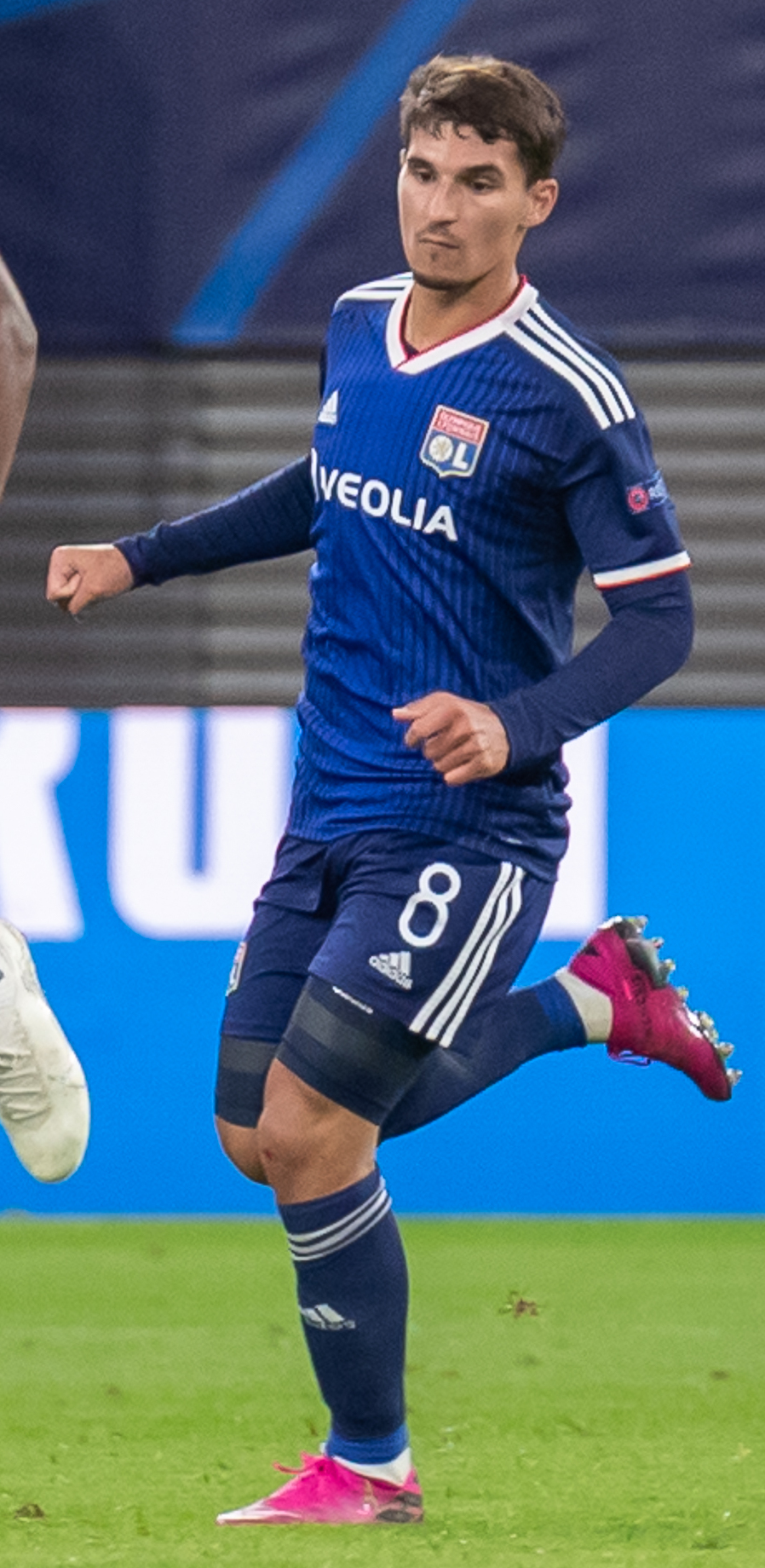
Aouar playing for Lyon against RB Leipzig in a Champions League match in 2019

Aouar joined the Olympique Lyonnais Academy in 2009 at the age of 11.

He signed a three-year professional contract at Lyon in July 2016. He made his first team debut in on 16 February 2017 in a 4–1 away win over AZ Alkmaar in the first-leg match of the round of 32 of the knockout phase of the UEFA Europa League, replacing Sergi Darder after 84 minutes. Aouar scored his first goal for Lyon's first team a week later in the second-leg match against AZ Alkmaar at Parc Olympique Lyonnais, which Lyon won 7–1. He made his Ligue 1 debut by starting in the away match against Bastia on 16 April 2017, but the match was abandoned at half-time with the score at 0–0. A win was given to Lyon three weeks later. He was nominated for the Golden Boy award in July 2018.

At the beginning of the 2017–18 season, despite having played only five competitive matches for Lyon's first team since he joined the club, Aouar was given the symbolic number 8 (having previously been worn by club legend Juninho) left free when Corentin Tolisso left the club for Bayern Munich in June 2017.

On 11 December 2019, Aouar scored a goal against RB Leipzig in a Champions League group stage match helping Lyon to secure their way into the Champions League round of 16. His side later upset both Juventus and Manchester City to reach the semi-finals, where they were beaten by Bayern Munich.

=== Roma ===
On 11 June 2023, it was announced that Aouar had signed a five-year contract with Serie A club Roma. Later that year, on 26 August, he scored his first goal in a 2–1 away defeat against Hellas Verona.

=== Al-Ittihad ===
On 16 July 2024, Aouar signed for Saudi club Al-Ittihad for a reported fee of €12 million.

== International career ==
=== France ===
In 2014, Aouar was called up to the France under-17 national team, but only played one game. In 2019, he was a starter throughout the UEFA European Under-21 Championship for the France under-21 national team, eventually being eliminated by Spain in the semi-finals.

In November 2019, Aouar was called up to the France national team, but was unable to join the team due to suffering an injury. He was not replaced in the squad. On 26 August 2020, Aouar received his first call-up for France to prepare for 2020–21 UEFA Nations League matches against Sweden and Croatia in early September. However, on 27 August, he tested positive for COVID-19 during a regular test carried out by Lyon, amid its pandemic in France; he was put into isolation for a fortnight and had to skip training for at least 10 to 15 days. Therefore, France decided to replace him with Nabil Fekir. Aouar eventually made his France debut on 7 October 2020 in a 7–1 friendly win over Ukraine.

=== Algeria ===
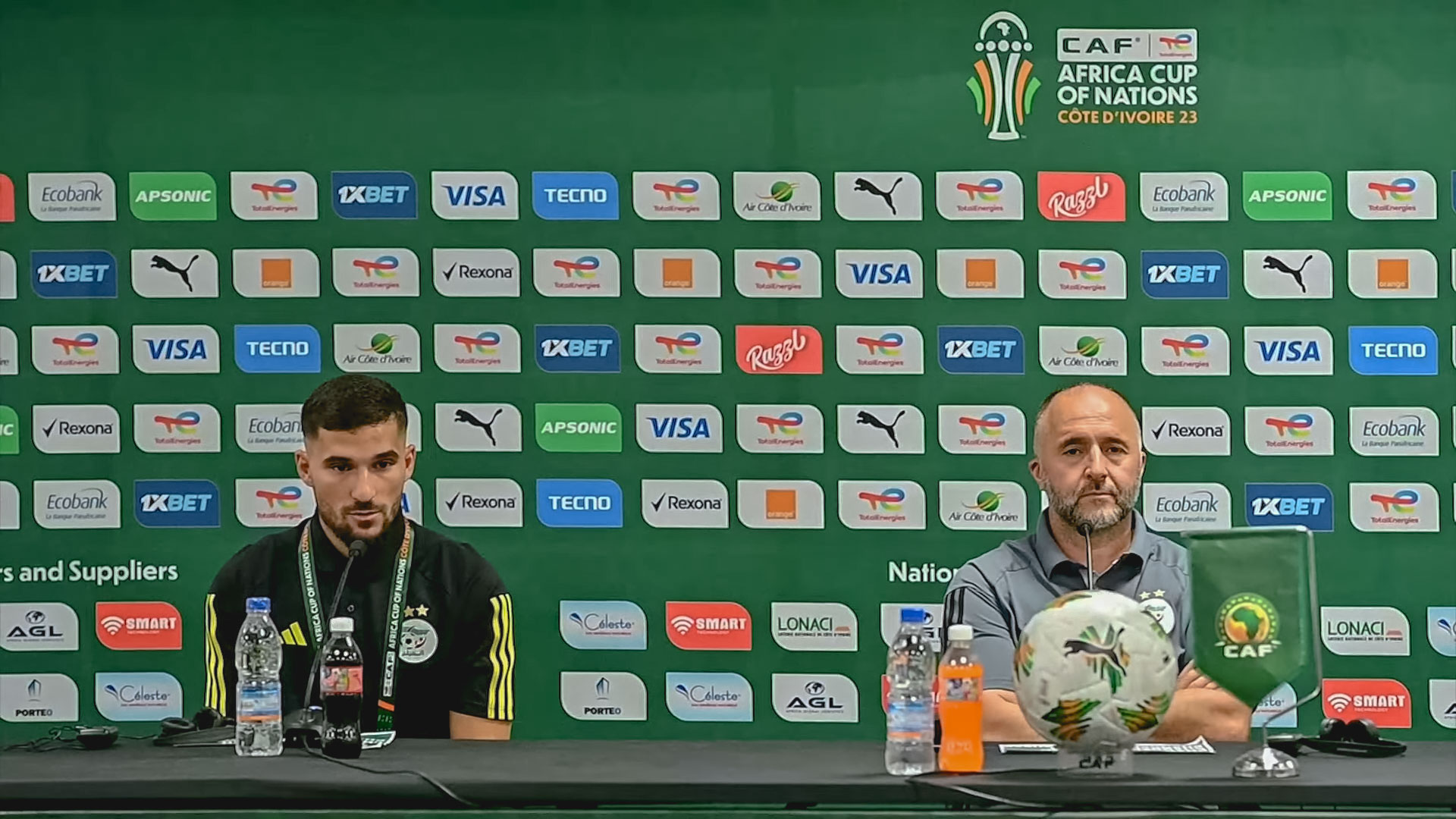
Aouar and Djamel Belmadi in a press conference before the match against Mauritania at the 2024 Africa Cup of Nations

In March 2023, Aouar switched his international allegiance from his birth to the football federation of the country of his parents, Algeria. In an interview with the Algerian Football Federation, he said, "the president held out his hand to me and it seemed like it was just meant to be. I had a second chance and I jumped on it." He also added that he "regretted" having played for France, saying that he felt he "hadn't made the best choice". On 18 June 2023, he made his debut for Algeria against Uganda in the African Cup of Nations qualification match.

In December 2023, he was named in Algeria's squad for the 2023 Africa Cup of Nations. On 19 December 2025, Aouar withdrew from the 2025 Africa Cup of Nations due to injury, and was replaced by Himad Abdelli.

On 31 May 2026, Aouar was named in Vladimir Petković's 26-man Algeria squad for the 2026 FIFA World Cup.

== Style of play ==
Aouar is an attacking midfielder who can play anywhere in midfield, and has been praised for his excellent technical ability and calmness with the ball at his feet.

== Personal life ==
Aouar holds French and Algerian nationalities. He holds Juninho and Zinedine Zidane as role models. He is a Muslim.

== Career statistics ==
=== Club ===
As of match played 20 October 2026

Appearances and goals by club, season and competition
Club	Season	League			National cup (Note: Includes Coupe de France, Coppa Italia, King's Cup)		League cup (Note: Includes Coupe de la Ligue)		Continental		Other		Total	
Club	Season	Division	Apps	Goals	Apps	Goals	Apps	Goals	Apps	Goals	Apps	Goals	Apps	Goals
Lyon B	2015–16	CFA	6	0	—		—		—		—		6	0
Lyon B	2016–17	CFA	15	4	—		—		—		—		15	4
Lyon B	2017–18	Championnat National 2	1	0	—		—		—		—		1	0
Lyon B	Total		22	4	—		—		—		—		22	4
Lyon	2016–17	Ligue 1	3	0	0	0	0	0	2 (Note: Appearances in UEFA Europa League)	1	—		5	1
Lyon	2017–18	Ligue 1	32	6	4	0	0	0	8	1	—		44	7
Lyon	2018–19	Ligue 1	37	7	2	0	1	0	7 (Note: Appearances in UEFA Champions League)	0	—		47	7
Lyon	2019–20	Ligue 1	25	3	4	3	4	2	8	1	—		41	9
Lyon	2020–21	Ligue 1	30	7	3	1	—		—		—		33	8
Lyon	2021–22	Ligue 1	36	6	0	0	—		9	2	—		45	8
Lyon	2022–23	Ligue 1	16	1	2	0	—		—		—		18	1
Lyon	Total		179	30	15	4	5	2	34	5	—		233	41
Roma	2023–24	Serie A	16	4	0	0	—		9	0	—		25	4
Al-Ittihad	2024–25	Saudi Pro League	30	12	4	1	—		—		—		34	13
Al-Ittihad	2025–26	Saudi Pro League	23	8	3	1	—		8 (Note: Appearances in AFC Champions League Elite)	6	1 (Note: Appearance in Saudi Super Cup)	0	35	15
Al-Ittihad	2026–27	Saudi Pro League	8	1	1	0	—		3	1	—		12	2
Al-Ittihad	Total		61	21	8	2	—		11	7	1	0	81	30
Career total			278	59	23	6	5	2	54	12	1	0	361	79

=== International ===
As of match played 2 July 2026

Appearances and goals by national team and year
National team	Year	Apps	Goals
France	2020	1	0
France	Total	1	0
Algeria	2023	5	2
Algeria	2024	9	3
Algeria	2025	4	0
Algeria	2026	7	1
Algeria	Total	25	6
Career total		26	6

Algeria score listed first, score column indicates score after each Aouar goal

List of international goals scored by Houssem Aouar
No.	Date	Venue	Opponent	Score	Result	Competition
1	12 October 2023	Chahid Hamlaoui Stadium, Constantine, Algeria	Cape Verde	2–0	5–1	Friendly
2	12 October 2023	Chahid Hamlaoui Stadium, Constantine, Algeria	Cape Verde	3–0	5–1	Friendly
3	10 June 2024	Mandela National Stadium, Kampala, Uganda	Uganda	1–1	2–1	2026 FIFA World Cup qualification
4	5 September 2024	Miloud Hadefi Stadium, Oran, Algeria	Equatorial Guinea	1–0	2–0	2025 Africa Cup of Nations qualification
5	10 October 2024	19 May 1956 Stadium, Annaba, Algeria	Togo	3–1	5–1	2025 Africa Cup of Nations qualification
6	27 March 2026	Stadio Luigi Ferraris, Genoa, Italy	Guatemala	4–0	7–0	Friendly

== Honours ==
Lyon

- Coupe de la Ligue runner-up: 2019–20

Al-Ittihad

- Saudi Pro League: 2024–25
- King's Cup: 2024–25

Individual

- UEFA Champions League Squad of the Season: 2019–20
