= Mario Mitaj =

Albanian footballer (born 2003)

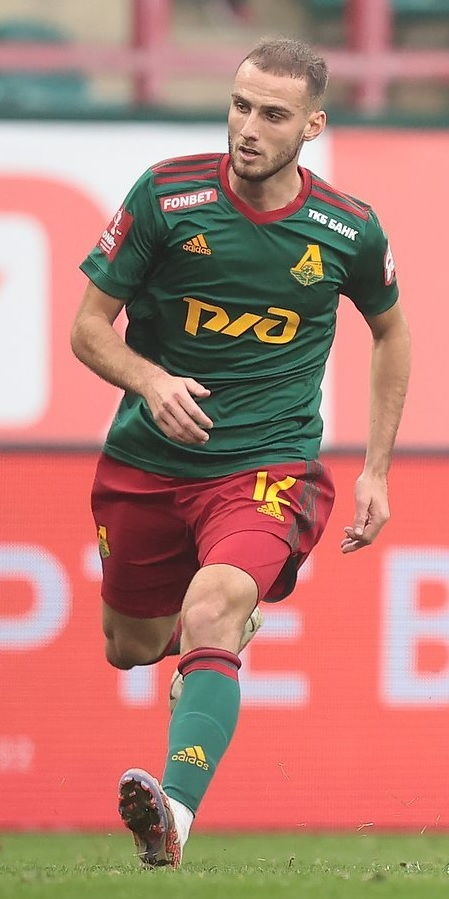
- Mitaj with Lokomotiv Moscow in 2022

Personal information
- Date of birth: 6 August 2003 (age 23)
- Place of birth: Athens, Greece
- Height: 1.80 m (5 ft 11 in)
- Position: Left-back

Team information
- Current team: Genoa (on loan from Al-Ittihad)
- Number: 2

Youth career
- –2013: Eleftheroupoli
- 2013–2020: AEK Athens

Senior career*
Years	Team	Apps	(Gls)
2020–2022	AEK Athens	11	(0)
2021–2022	AEK Athens B	20	(0)
2022–2025	Lokomotiv Moscow	36	(0)
2024–2025	→ Al-Ittihad (loan)	12	(1)
2025–	Al-Ittihad	27	(1)
2026–	→ Genoa (loan)	2	(0)

International career^{‡}
2019	Albania U16	6	(2)
2018–2019	Albania U17	6	(1)
2022	Albania U20	2	(0)
2020–2023	Albania U21	16	(0)
2021–	Albania	39	(0)
- * Club domestic league appearances and goals as of 28 October 2026 ‡ National team caps and goals as of 15 November 2026

Mario Mitaj (Albanian pronunciation: [ˈmaɾio miˈtaj]; born 6 August 2003) is a professional footballer who plays as a left-back for Serie A club Genoa, on loan from Saudi Pro League club Al-Ittihad. Born in Greece, he represents the Albania national team. Known for his versatility, he is also capable of playing in other defensive positions.

A product of the AEK Athens academy, Mitaj made his professional debut in the Super League Greece at the age of 17, becoming one of the youngest foreign players to appear for the club. He went on to feature for both the first team and reserve side, AEK Athens B, before joining Lokomotiv Moscow in 2022. In 2024, he moved to Al-Ittihad on loan, with the transfer later being made permanent, and helped the club win a domestic double in the 2024–25 season, securing both the Saudi Pro League and the King's Cup.

At international level, Mitaj represented Albania at various youth levels before making his senior debut in 2021 at the age of 17, narrowly missing out on becoming the nation's youngest-ever debutant. He established himself as a regular starter during the UEFA Euro 2024 qualifying campaign and played every minute of Albania's matches at the UEFA Euro 2024 final tournament in Germany, becoming the country's youngest player to appear at a major international tournament.

== Club career ==
=== AEK Athens ===
Born in Athens to Albanian parents from Vermosh, Mitaj began playing football at a young age. In 2013, while playing for Eleftheroupoli, he was spotted by scouts and joined the AEK Athens academy after a successful trial, where he was placed in the club's U12 team. Primarily a left-back, he was also capable of playing in other defensive positions and progressed through the club's youth system, where he was regarded as one of its most promising prospects; his performances and maturity led to his inclusion in first-team training sessions in the summer of 2020 under coach Massimo Carrera. On 12 August 2020, Mitaj signed his first professional contract with AEK Athens, being officially promoted to the senior squad ahead of the 2020–21 Super League Greece season.

On 18 October 2020, Mitaj made his Super League debut in a 1–1 draw against bitter rivals PAOK, becoming the youngest foreign player to appear for AEK at the age of 17 years and 73 days. He made his European debut on 10 December 2020, playing the full 90 minutes in a 2–0 away defeat to Leicester City on the final matchday of the 2020–21 UEFA Europa League group stage. Three days later, Mitaj started in his second league appearance and provided two assists in a 4–3 away win against Apollon Smyrnis, before being substituted in the 81st minute. He retained his place in the starting lineup the following week, playing around 80 minutes under coach Carrera in a 2–2 draw against Volos, and made three further first-team appearances during the second half of the regular season under manager Manolo Jiménez.

On 2 February 2021, Mitaj extended his contract until the summer of 2023. He also featured in the Greek Cup, starting in AEK's 4–2 quarter-final victory over Volos on 10 February and appearing as a substitute in the second leg of the semi-finals against PAOK on 29 April, as the club were eliminated 3–1 on aggregate. During the championship play-offs, he made four appearances in ten matches, including one start, as AEK finished fourth and qualified for the Europa Conference League second qualifying round. Mitaj ended the season with 13 appearances across all competitions. Throughout his first season, Mitaj's emergence in the first team led to his first senior international call-up for Albania in March 2021, while still aged 17.

Mitaj began the 2021–22 season in UEFA Europa Conference League qualifying against Velež Mostar, appearing as a substitute in the final half-hour of a 2–1 first-leg defeat on 22 July 2021 before starting the second leg a week later and being substituted after around 70 minutes, with the match still goalless as AEK eventually won 1–0 but were eliminated 3–2 on penalties. On 10 August 2021, he signed a contract extension until 2026, securing his long-term future at the club and reinforcing his status as one of AEK's key youth prospects who had already been integrated into the first-team setup and was viewed as a long-term option at left-back.

Under head coach Vladan Milojević, Mitaj did not make a first-team appearance until the closing stages of the 2021–22 Super League Greece season, with experienced international Ehsan Hajsafi preferred at left-back, although he remained involved in several matchday squads during the autumn and winter months. In November 2021, AEK announced that Mitaj was among a number of first-team players expected to feature for the newly established AEK Athens B in order to gain regular playing time, highlighting him as one of the club's notable young prospects. He subsequently became a regular for the reserve side in Super League Greece 2, making 20 league appearances between November 2021 and April 2022 as the team finished fifth in its group.

In total, he made 16 official appearances for AEK Athens' first team. On 19 August 2022, AEK Athens agreed to sell Mitaj to Lokomotiv Moscow for a reported fee of €3 million plus a sell-on clause, with the player leaving the club shortly after the agreement was reached.

=== Lokomotiv Moscow ===
On 27 August 2022, Mitaj joined Lokomotiv Moscow of the Russian Premier League, signing a five-year contract with the club. He made his debut on 31 August 2022 in a Russian Cup match against Pari Nizhny Novgorod, which ended in a 2–0 away defeat. Four days later, he made his league debut in a 2–1 defeat to Akhmat Grozny.

By the end of the season, Mitaj had made 14 league appearances, totaling 774 minutes, as Lokomotiv finished eighth in the league. He also featured in four Russian Cup matches. Throughout the campaign, he was deployed in multiple positions and impressed with his defensive work rate and adaptability.

During the 2023–24 Russian Premier League season, Mitaj became a regular starter under head coach Mikhail Galaktionov, primarily operating as a left-back in both four-man and three-man defensive systems. His performances were widely praised in Russian media for tactical discipline and crossing ability. On 21 October 2023, he was named player of the match in a goalless derby draw against Dynamo Moscow, having played the full 90 minutes in midfield.

By the end of the campaign, Mitaj had made more than 25 league appearances and contributed several assists as Lokomotiv finished fourth in the league and reached the quarter-finals of the Russian Cup. His growing influence led to transfer interest from Italian Serie A clubs ahead of the 2024 summer transfer window.

At the start of the 2024–25 season, he made four appearances across league and cup competitions in July and August 2024, registering one assist in a 4–0 Russian Cup win over Khimki.

=== Al-Ittihad ===
On 3 September 2024, Mitaj joined Saudi Pro League club Al-Ittihad on a season-long loan deal until the end of the 2024–25 season, with an option for the Saudi club to purchase him permanently. The fee was reported to be around €1.2 million. During his loan spell, he established himself as a regular starter for the Saudi side, making 18 league appearances and scoring once. On 31 January 2025, Al-Ittihad activated the purchase option and signed Mitaj on a permanent basis, reportedly for a fee of around €4 million, securing him on a long-term contract. Having missed match action since 1 February due to injury, Mitaj returned to the starting lineup against Al-Riyadh under coach Laurent Blanc. Mitaj contributed to Al-Ittihad's title-winning campaign, helping the club secure the 2024–25 Saudi Pro League championship in his debut season. Alongside the league triumph, Al-Ittihad also won the King's Cup, completing a domestic double for the first time since 2018. He featured in the King's Cup, including playing 105 minutes in the quarter-final victory over Al-Hilal, which was decided by penalties, and started in the final as Al-Ittihad defeated Al-Qadisiya 3–1 to lift the trophy. He also registered an assist in a 2–0 league victory over Al-Fateh in November 2024, a result that temporarily moved Al-Ittihad to the top of the league standings.

In the 2025–26 season, Mitaj made 21 league appearances, scoring once and providing two assists. Across all competitions, he featured in 36 matches. On 19 August 2025, he started in the 2025 Saudi Super Cup semi-final against Al-Nassr, facing five-time Ballon d'Or winner Cristiano Ronaldo, as Al-Ittihad were eliminated following a 2–1 defeat. He made his AFC Champions League debut on 15 September 2025 against Al-Wahda in the group stage, playing the full 90 minutes in a 1–1 draw.

==== Loan to Genoa ====
On 31 July 2026, Mitaj joined Genoa on a season-long loan with an option to buy.

== International career ==
Born in Greece and a resident of Nea Ionia, Attica, Mitaj remained eligible to represent either Greece or Albania at international level but chose to represent Albania, initially progressing through national youth levels prior to making his senior debut.

=== Youth ===
Mitaj made his youth international debut for the Albania under-17s in October 2018 during the 2019 UEFA European Under-17 Championship qualification at the age of 15, starting all three matches and scoring the winning goal in a victory over Azerbaijan, securing Albania's only points of the campaign. In early 2019, he represented the Albania under-16s in friendly competitions, including the Aegean Cup and the UEFA Under-16 Development Tournament, where he made six appearances and scored twice as Albania recorded one victory during those tournaments. Later that year, Mitaj captained the Albania under-17 team during the 2020 UEFA European Under-17 Championship qualification, starting all matches as Albania failed to score and recording one goalless draw during the campaign.

In 2020, Mitaj made his debut for the Albania under-21 team at the age of 17, featuring during the closing stages of the 2021 UEFA European Under-21 Championship qualification and later becoming a regular member of the squad in the 2023 UEFA European Under-21 Championship qualification, making 11 competitive appearances across the two qualification campaigns. During the 2022–23 period, he also played in six friendly matches, including for the under-21 side, and two appearances for a temporary under-20 side.

=== Senior ===
On 31 March 2021, Mitaj made his senior debut for Albania in a 2022 FIFA World Cup qualifier against San Marino and, aged 17 years and 237 days, became the country's second-youngest senior international, four days older than the record holder, as Albania won 2–0 away.

Mitaj returned to the senior team in June 2023 during the second round of the UEFA Euro 2024 qualifying campaign and, under head coach Sylvinho, played every minute of Albania's remaining qualifying matches, cementing his place in the starting lineup despite being the youngest player in the squad. Albania finished top of their qualifying group for the first time in their history, collecting 15 points—level with the Czech Republic but ahead on head-to-head record—and qualifying for the final tournament of the UEFA European Championship for only the second time. In June 2024, he was included in the final 26-man squad for UEFA Euro 2024 in Germany, and played every minute of Albania's matches in Group B as the team finished bottom of the group with one point and was eliminated from the tournament.

During the 2026 FIFA World Cup qualification, Mitaj missed Albania's opening matches against England and Andorra due to injury, as well as the closing match against England as a precaution to avoid suspension, while in the remaining five matches he started every game as Albania recorded two draws and three consecutive victories, finishing as group runners-up and advancing to the play-off round for the first time in their history. He was also included in the Sofascore Team of the Qualifiers as the highest-rated left-back, with an overall rating of 7.62 across the qualifying campaign. On 27 March 2026, Albania were eliminated from the play-offs following a 2–1 away defeat to Poland, with Mitaj playing the full 90 minutes and receiving a yellow card in the 34th minute as Albania led at half-time before conceding twice in the second half.

== Personal life ==
Following his first professional debut for AEK in 2017, Mitaj stated that Lionel Messi was his favourite player, while Marcelo was his main inspiration in his position.

== Career statistics ==
=== Club ===
As of match played 28 October 2026

Appearances and goals by club, season and competition
Club	Season	League			National cup (Note: Includes Greek Cup, Russian Cup, King's Cup)		Continental		Other		Total	
Club	Season	Division	Apps	Goals	Apps	Goals	Apps	Goals	Apps	Goals	Apps	Goals
AEK Athens	2020–21	Super League Greece	10	0	2	0	1 (Note: Appearance in UEFA Europa League)	0	—		13	0
AEK Athens	2021–22	Super League Greece	1	0	0	0	2 (Note: Appearances in UEFA Europa Conference League)	0	—		3	0
AEK Athens	Total		11	0	2	0	3	0	—		16	0
AEK Athens B	2021–22	Super League Greece 2	20	0	—		—		—		20	0
Lokomotiv Moscow	2022–23	Russian Premier League	14	0	4	0	—		—		18	0
Lokomotiv Moscow	2023–24	Russian Premier League	21	0	6	0	—		—		27	0
Lokomotiv Moscow	2024–25	Russian Premier League	1	0	3	0	—		—		4	0
Lokomotiv Moscow	Total		36	0	13	0	—		—		49	0
Al-Ittihad (loan)	2024–25	Saudi Pro League	12	1	3	0	—		—		15	1
Al-Ittihad	2024–25	Saudi Pro League	6	0	1	0	—		—		7	0
Al-Ittihad	2025–26	Saudi Pro League	21	1	4	0	10 (Note: Appearances in AFC Champions League Elite)	0	1 (Note: Appearance in Saudi Super Cup)	0	36	1
Al-Ittihad	Total		39	2	8	0	10	0	1	0	58	2
Genoa (loan)	2026–27	Serie A	2	0	2	0	–		–		4	0
Career total			108	2	25	0	13	0	1	0	147	2

=== International ===
As of match played 15 November 2026

Appearances and goals by national team and year
National team	Year	Apps	Goals
Albania	2021	1	0
Albania	2022 (Note: Conclude with Non-FIFA international football)	1	0
Albania	2023	8	0
Albania	2024	13	0
Albania	2025	6	0
Albania	2026	10	0
Total		39	0

== Honours ==
Al-Ittihad

- Saudi Pro League: 2024–25
- King's Cup: 2024–25
