= Steven Bergwijn =

Dutch footballer (born 1997)

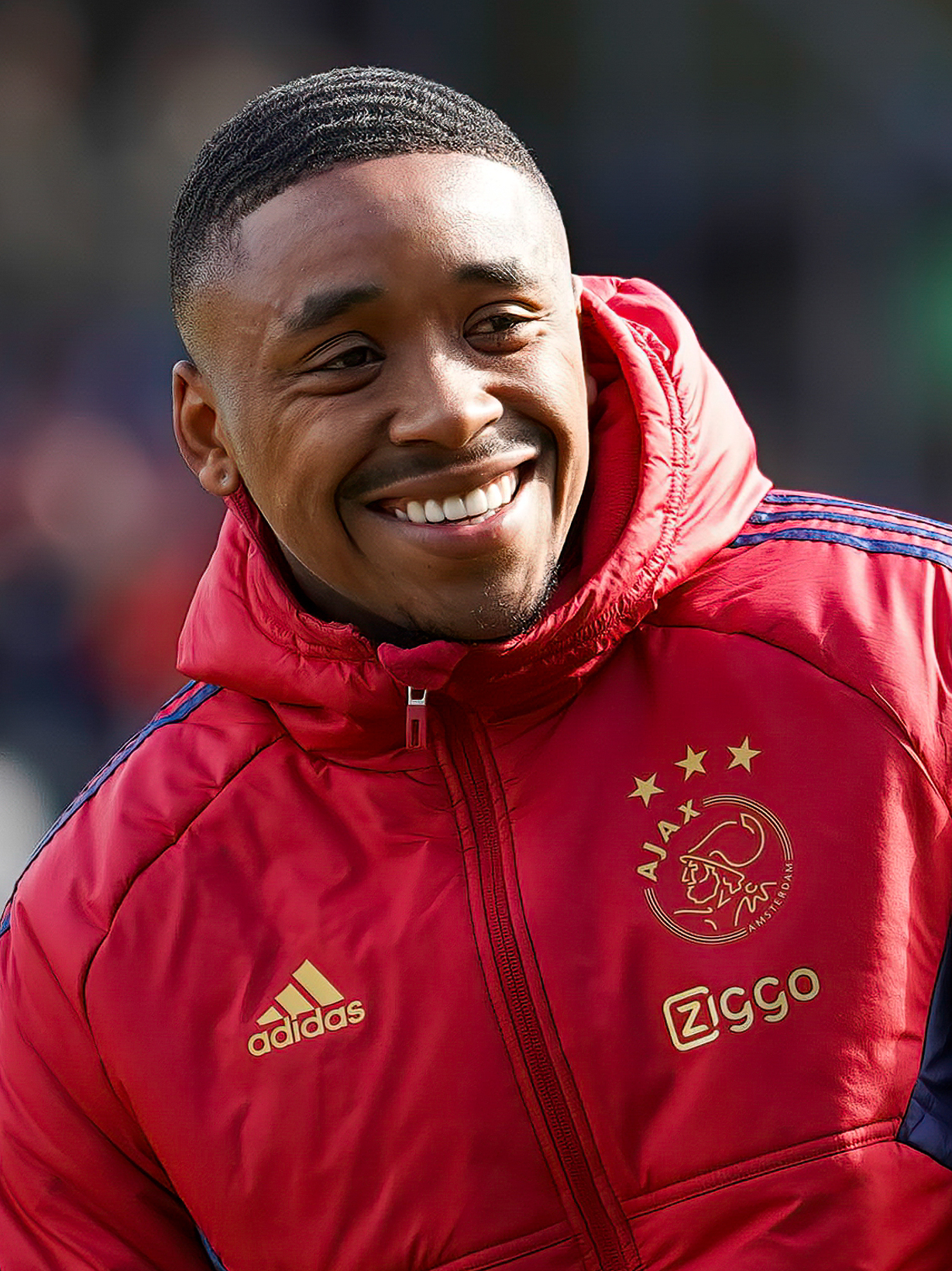
- Bergwijn with Ajax in 2023

Personal information
- Full name: Steven Charles Bergwijn
- Date of birth: 8 October 1997 (age 29)
- Place of birth: Amsterdam, Netherlands
- Height: 1.71 m (5 ft 7 in)
- Positions: Left winger; forward

Team information
- Current team: Al-Ittihad
- Number: 34

Youth career
- ASC Waterwijk
- 2005–2011: Ajax
- 2011–2014: PSV

Senior career*
Years	Team	Apps	(Gls)
2014–2017	Jong PSV	31	(14)
2014–2020	PSV	112	(29)
2020–2022	Tottenham Hotspur	60	(7)
2022–2024	Ajax	57	(24)
2024–	Al-Ittihad	56	(23)

International career
2013–2014	Netherlands U17	12	(8)
2015	Netherlands U18	1	(0)
2014–2016	Netherlands U19	16	(8)
2016	Netherlands U20	4	(2)
2016–2018	Netherlands U21	10	(3)
2018–2024	Netherlands	35	(8)
Medal record
Representing Netherlands
UEFA European Championship
Bronze medal – third place	2024 Germany	Team
UEFA Nations League
Runner-up	2019 Portugal	Team
UEFA European Under-17 Championship
Runner-up	2014 Malta	Team
- * Club domestic league appearances and goals as of 30 October 2026 (UTC)

Steven Charles Bergwijn (born 8 October 1997) is a Dutch professional footballer who plays as a left winger or a forward for Saudi Pro League club Al-Ittihad.

== Early life ==
Steven Charles Bergwijn was born 8 October 1997 in Amsterdam to parents from Suriname.

== Club career ==
=== PSV ===
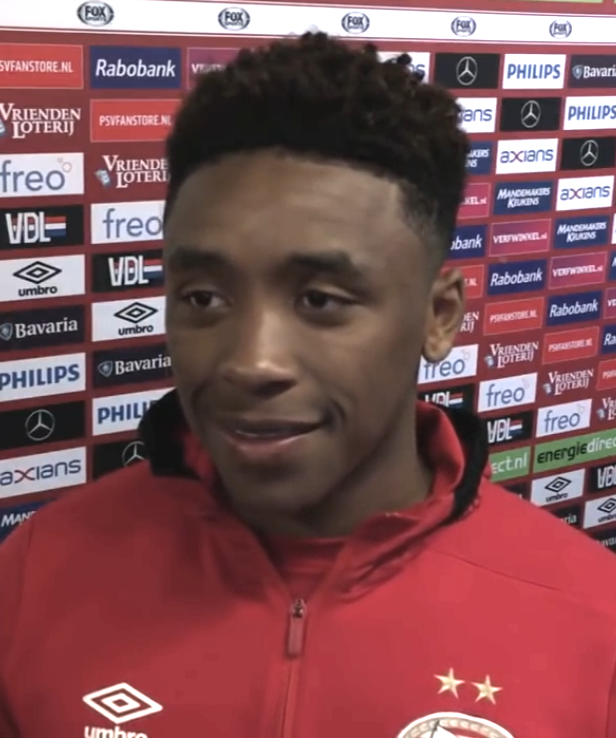
Bergwijn with PSV in 2017

Bergwijn started his career in the Ajax youth academy up to 2011, but due to a conflict with one of the trainers, chose to leave. He was immediately signed by PSV. Bergwijn made his first-team debut for Jong PSV in the second division on 9 August 2014 against Achilles '29. He replaced Elvio van Overbeek after 77 minutes in a 2–0 home win.

He scored the third goal as PSV beat Ajax 3–0 to clinch the 2017–18 Eredivisie title.

=== Tottenham Hotspur ===
At the end of the January 2020 transfer window Bergwijn signed a five-year contract with Tottenham Hotspur in a deal worth a reported £26.7 million. He scored his first goal for the club in his Premier League debut, a 2–0 victory against Manchester City, and was also named Man of the Match by Sky Sports. On 6 March 2020, Bergwijn suffered a sprain to his left ankle in the match against Burnley which might have sidelined him for the rest of the season, but due to the Premier League break caused by COVID-19, Bergwijn had time to recover and was able to return to the starting eleven, scoring against Manchester United in Tottenham's first post-break match.

On 19 January 2022, Bergwijn scored a brace against Leicester City in dramatic fashion, scoring both goals in injury time to give Spurs a 3–2 victory.

=== Ajax ===
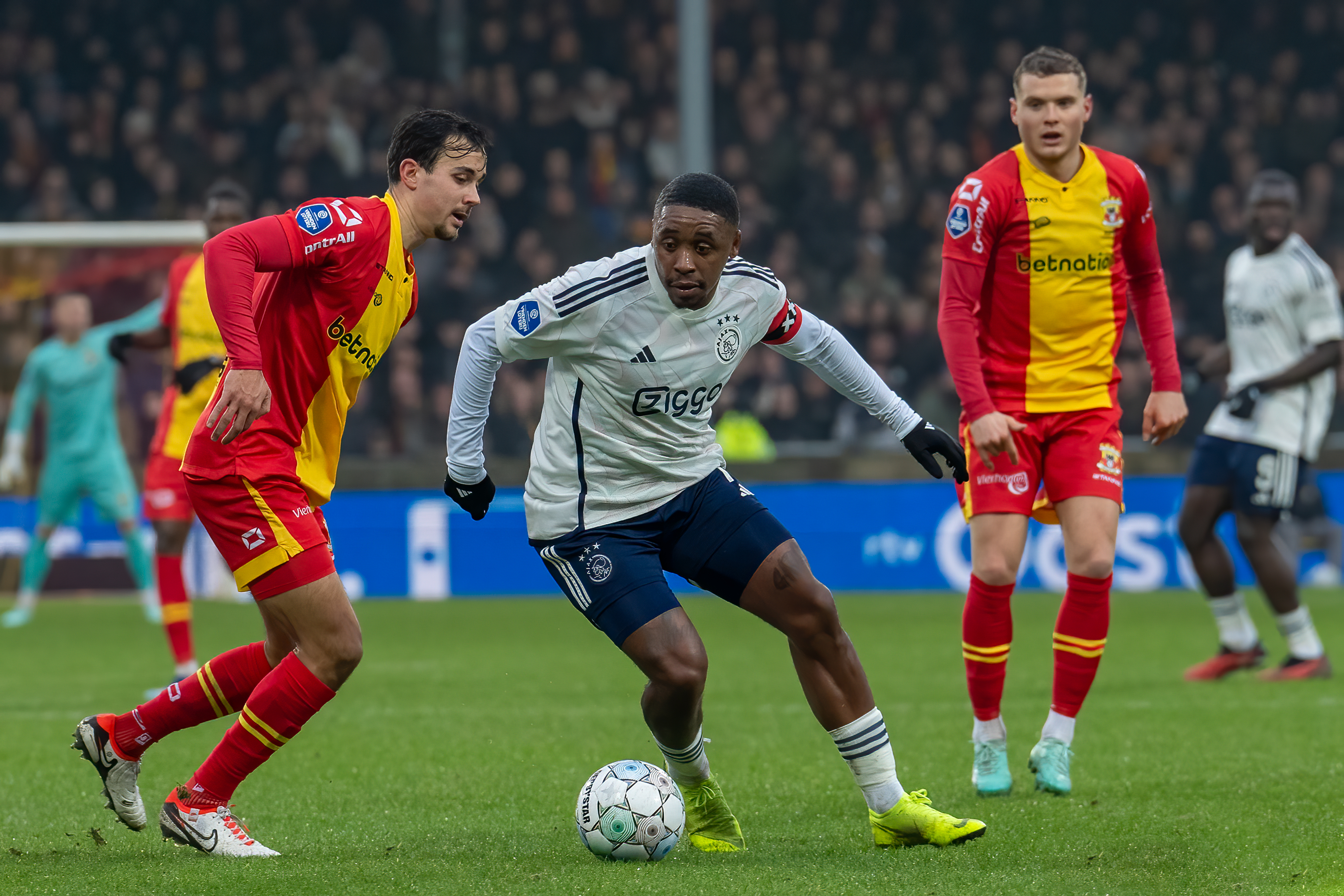
Bergwijn as Ajax captain in 2024.

On 8 July 2022, Bergwijn returned to the Netherlands, signing a five-year contract with Ajax. The transfer fee paid to Tottenham Hotspur was of €31.25 million. This was the most expensive transfer in the history of the Eredivisie, breaking the record set when Ajax bought Sébastien Haller in 2021 (€22.5 million). On 14 August 2022, he scored a hat-trick in a 6–1 win over Groningen. On 8 August 2023 Bergwijn was announced by Ajax as their new captain replacing the recently departing Dušan Tadic.

=== Al-Ittihad ===
On 2 September 2024, Bergwijn signed a three-year contract with Saudi Pro League club Al-Ittihad. He won the domestic double with the club in his debut 2024–25 season.

== International career ==
Bergwijn earned his first full international call up when Ronald Koeman named him in the Netherlands squad in October 2018. He made his debut as a starter on 13 October 2018 in a 3–0 2018–19 UEFA Nations League A victory over Germany.

Bergwijn was named in the final Netherlands squad for the 2022 FIFA World Cup.

On 29 May 2024, Bergwijn was named in the Netherlands' squad for UEFA Euro 2024.

On 3 September 2024, the day after Bergwijn's move to Saudi Arabia, Dutch manager Ronald Koeman said that Bergwijn would not be called up to represent the national team anymore, citing "lack of sporting ambition" as the main reason for his decision.

== Career statistics ==
=== Club ===
As of match played 20 October 2026

Appearances and goals by club, season and competition
Club	Season	League			National cup (Note: Includes KNVB Cup, FA Cup, King's Cup)		League cup (Note: Includes EFL Cup)		Continental		Other		Total	
Club	Season	Division	Apps	Goals	Apps	Goals	Apps	Goals	Apps	Goals	Apps	Goals	Apps	Goals
Jong PSV	2014–15	Eerste Divisie	7	3	—		—		—		—		7	3
Jong PSV	2015–16	Eerste Divisie	20	9	—		—		—		—		20	9
Jong PSV	2016–17	Eerste Divisie	4	2	—		—		—		—		4	2
Jong PSV	Total		31	14	—		—		—		—		31	14
PSV Eindhoven	2014–15	Eredivisie	1	0	1	0	—		0	0	—		2	0
PSV Eindhoven	2015–16	Eredivisie	5	0	2	0	—		1 (Note: Appearance(s) in UEFA Champions League)	0	0	0	8	0
PSV Eindhoven	2016–17	Eredivisie	25	2	2	0	—		6	0	0	0	33	2
PSV Eindhoven	2017–18	Eredivisie	32	8	2	0	—		2 (Note: Appearances in UEFA Europa League)	0	—		36	8
PSV Eindhoven	2018–19	Eredivisie	33	14	0	0	—		7	1	1 (Note: Appearance in Johan Cruyff Shield)	0	41	15
PSV Eindhoven	2019–20	Eredivisie	16	5	2	0	—		10 (Note: Two appearances in UEFA Champions League, eight appearances and one goal in UEFA Europa League)	1	1	0	29	6
PSV Eindhoven	Total		112	29	9	0	—		26	2	2	0	149	31
Tottenham Hotspur	2019–20	Premier League	14	3	1	0	0	0	1	0	—		16	3
Tottenham Hotspur	2020–21	Premier League	21	1	1	0	2	0	11	0	—		35	1
Tottenham Hotspur	2021–22	Premier League	25	3	2	0	2	1	3 (Note: Appearances in UEFA Europa Conference League)	0	—		32	4
Tottenham Hotspur	Total		60	7	4	0	4	1	15	0	—		83	8
Ajax	2022–23	Eredivisie	32	12	4	1	—		8 (Note: Six appearances and two goals in UEFA Champions League, two appearances in UEFA Europa League)	2	1	1	45	16
Ajax	2023–24	Eredivisie	24	12	0	0	—		7	1	—		31	13
Ajax	2024–25	Eredivisie	1	0	—		—		3	0	—		4	0
Ajax	Total		57	24	4	1	—		18	3	1	1	80	29
Al-Ittihad	2024–25	Saudi Pro League	25	13	4	0	—		—		—		29	13
Al-Ittihad	2025–26	Saudi Pro League	21	5	3	1	—		8 (Note: Appearances in AFC Champions League Elite)	2	1 (Note: Appearance in Saudi Super Cup)	1	33	9
Al-Ittihad	2026–27	Saudi Pro League	9	5	1	0	—		3	2	—		13	7
Al-Ittihad	Total		55	23	8	1	—		11	4	1	1	75	29
Career total			314	96	24	2	4	1	70	9	4	2	417	111

=== International ===
Appearances and goals by national team and year
National team	Year	Apps	Goals
Netherlands	2018	3	0
Netherlands	2019	6	0
Netherlands	2020	2	1
Netherlands	2021	5	1
Netherlands	2022	12	5
Netherlands	2023	4	1
Netherlands	2024	3	0
Total		35	8

Scores and results list the Netherlands' goal tally first. Score column indicates score after each Bergwijn goal.

List of international goals scored by Steven Bergwijn
No.	Date	Venue	Cap	Opponent	Score	Result	Competition	Ref.
1	4 September 2020	Johan Cruyff Arena, Amsterdam, Netherlands	10	Poland	1–0	1–0	2020–21 UEFA Nations League A	
2	16 November 2021	De Kuip, Rotterdam, Netherlands	16	Norway	1–0	2–0	2022 FIFA World Cup qualification	
3	26 March 2022	Johan Cruyff Arena, Amsterdam, Netherlands	17	Denmark	1–0	4–2	Friendly	
4	26 March 2022	Johan Cruyff Arena, Amsterdam, Netherlands	17	Denmark	4–2	4–2	Friendly	
5	29 March 2022	Johan Cruyff Arena, Amsterdam, Netherlands	18	Germany	1–1	1–1	Friendly	
6	3 June 2022	King Baudouin Stadium, Brussels, Belgium	19	Belgium	1–0	4–1	2022–23 UEFA Nations League A	
7	22 September 2022	Stadion Narodowy, Warsaw, Poland	23	Poland	2–0	2–0	2022–23 UEFA Nations League A	
8	18 June 2023	De Grolsch Veste, Enschede, Netherlands	30	Italy	1–2	2–3	2023 UEFA Nations League Finals	

== Honours ==
PSV

- Eredivisie: 2014–15, 2015–16, 2017–18
- Johan Cruyff Shield: 2016

Tottenham Hotspur

- EFL Cup runner-up: 2020–21

Ajax

- KNVB Cup runner-up: 2022–23

Al-Ittihad

- Saudi Pro League: 2024–25
- King's Cup: 2024–25

Individual

- UEFA European Under-17 Championship Golden Player: 2014
- UEFA European Under-17 Championship Team of the Tournament: 2014
- Eredivisie Player of the Month: February 2018
- Eredivisie Talent of the Month: August 2018, December 2018
- Eredivisie Team of the Month: August 2022, September 2022, November 2023
