= Ahmed Al-Julaydan =

Saudi Arabian footballer (born 2004)

Personal information
- Full name: Ahmed Yousef Ahmed Al-Julaydan
- Date of birth: 8 March 2004 (age 22)
- Place of birth: Al-Ahsa, Saudi Arabia
- Height: 1.70 m (5 ft 7 in)
- Position: Right-back

Team information
- Current team: Al-Ittihad
- Number: 32

Youth career
- –2023: Al-Fateh

Senior career*
Years	Team	Apps	(Gls)
2023–2025	Al-Fateh	25	(0)
2025–	Al-Ittihad	28	(0)

International career
2022–2023	Saudi Arabia U20	6	(0)
2024–	Saudi Arabia U23	6	(0)
- * Club domestic league appearances and goals as of 10 October 2026

Ahmed Al-Julaydan (Arabic: أحمد الجليدان; born 8 March 2004), is a Saudi Arabian football player who plays as a right-back for Al-Ittihad.

== Club career ==
Al-Julaydan started his career at the youth teams of Al-Fateh. He reached the first team in the 2022–2023 season. On 13 August 2025, he moved to Al-Ittihad.
