= Hamed Al-Shanqiti =

Saudi Arabian association football player

Personal information
- Full name: Hamed Abdullah Yousef Al-Shanqiti
- Date of birth: 26 April 2005 (age 21)
- Height: 1.95 m (6 ft 5 in)
- Position: Goalkeeper

Team information
- Current team: Al-Kholood (on loan from Al-Ittihad)
- Number: 1

Youth career
- –2021: Al-Hilal
- 2021–2024: Al-Shabab

Senior career*
| Years | Team | Apps | (Gls) |
| 2024 | Al-Shabab | 0 | (0) |
| 2024– | Al-Ittihad | 4 | (0) |
| 2026– | → Al-Kholood (loan) | 7 | (0) |

International career^{‡}
| 2025 | Saudi Arabia U20 | 6 | (0) |
| 2026– | Saudi Arabia | 1 | (0) |
- * Club domestic league appearances and goals as of 13 September 2026 ‡ National team caps and goals as of 17 November 2026

Hamed Al-Shanqiti (born 26 April 2005) is a Saudi Arabian football player who plays as a goalkeeper for Al-Kholood, on loan from Al-Ittihad.

== Honours ==
Al-Ittihad

- Saudi Pro League:2024–25
- King's Cup: 2024–25

Individual

- AFC U-20 Asian Cup Best Goalkeeper: 2025
