= Abdulelah Hawsawi =

Saudi Arabian footballer

Personal information
- Full name: Abdulelah Mohammed Saeed Hawsawi
- Date of birth: 2 June 2001 (age 25)
- Place of birth: Jeddah, Saudi Arabia
- Height: 1.82 m (5 ft 11 1/2 in)
- Position: Midfielder

Team information
- Current team: Al-Ettifaq (on loan from Al-Ittihad)
- Number: 77

Youth career
- Al-Ittihad

Senior career*
Years	Team	Apps	(Gls)
2021–	Al-Ittihad	12	(0)
2021–2023	→ Jeddah (loan)	57	(3)
2023–2024	→ Al-Khaleej (loan)	26	(1)
2025–2026	→ Al-Taawoun (loan)	12	(0)
2026–	→ Al-Ettifaq (loan)	5	(0)

International career^{‡}
2023–	Saudi Arabia U23	2	(0)
2023–	Saudi Arabia	4	(0)
- * Club domestic league appearances and goals as of 5 November 2026 ‡ National team caps and goals as of 31 December 2024

Abdulelah Mohammed Saeed Hawsawi (Arabic: عبد الإله محمد سعيد هوساوي; born 2 June 2001) is a Saudi Arabian professional footballer who plays as a midfielder for Al-Ettifaq, on loan from Al-Ittihad. He has also appeared for the Saudi U23 and the Saudi Arabia national team squad.

== Club career ==
Hawsawi began his career at the youth teams of Al-Ittihad. On 1 September 2021, Hawsawi signed his first professional contract with the club.

On the same day, he joined First Division side Jeddah on a one-year loan. On 20 August 2022, Jeddah announced that they had renewed Hawsawi's loan for another year.

On 2 July 2023, Hawsawi joined Pro League side Al-Khaleej on a one-year loan. He made his Pro League debut on 12 August 2023 against Al-Fayha by coming off the bench in the 90th minute replacing Abdullah Al-Shanqiti.

On 24 August 2023, Hawsawi made his first start for the club in a 1–1 draw against Al-Ettifaq. On 16 December 2023, Hawsawi scored his first goal for the club in a 1–0 win against Al-Riyadh.

On 3 April 2024, Hawsawi renewed his contract with Al-Ittihad. On 11 August 2025, Hawsawi joined Al-Taawoun on a one-year loan.

== International career ==
In October 2023, Hawsawi was called up to the Saudi Arabia U23 national team for the friendlies against Kyrgyzstan.

In November 2023, Hawsawi earned his first senior call-up for the 2026 FIFA World Cup qualifiers against Pakistan and Jordan. He was an unused substitute in both games.

== Honours ==
Al-Ittihad

- Saudi Pro League: 2024–25
- King's Cup: 2024–25

Individual

- Saudi Pro League Rising Star of the Month: December 2023
