= Saad Al-Mousa =

Saudi Arabian footballer (born 2002)

Personal information
- Full name: Saad Mohammed Misfer Al-Mousa Al-Qahtani
- Date of birth: 10 December 2002 (age 23)
- Place of birth: Dammam, Saudi Arabia
- Height: 1.83 m (6 ft 0 in)
- Position: Centre-back

Team information
- Current team: Al-Ittihad
- Number: 6

Youth career
- Al-Ettifaq

Senior career*
Years	Team	Apps	(Gls)
2022–2024	Al-Ettifaq	20	(0)
2024	→ Al-Ittihad (loan)	10	(1)
2024–	Al-Ittihad	33	(0)

International career^{‡}
2019–2020	Saudi Arabia U20		
2023–	Saudi Arabia U23		
2024–	Saudi Arabia	3	(0)
- * Club domestic league appearances and goals as of 30 October 2026 ‡ National team caps and goals as of 14 October 2025

Saad Mohammed Misfer Al-Mousa Al-Qahtani (Arabic: سعد محمد مسفر آل موسى القحطاني; born 10 December 2002) is a Saudi Arabian professional footballer who currently plays as a centre-back for Saudi Pro League club Al-Ittihad and the Saudi Arabia national team.

== Personal life ==
Saad's identical twin brother, Yasser Al-Mousa, is also a professional footballer. Both of the brothers played for Al-Ettifaq's youth and reserve teams before Yasser's departure in August 2023. Yasser currently plays for First Division side Hajer.

== Club career ==
Al-Mousa began his career at the youth team of Al-Ettifaq. He signed his first professional contract with the club on 3 February 2021. On 15 December 2022, Al-Mousa made his debut for Al-Ettifaq by starting in the 0–0 draw against Damac. On 29 March 2023, he was awarded the Young Player of the Month for his impressive performances in the month of March. On 17 January 2024, Al Mousa joined fellow Pro League side Al-Ittihad on a six-month loan. On 18 February 2024, he made his debut for Al-Ittihad replacing Fawaz Al-Sqoor in the 60th minute in the 2–0 win against Al-Riyadh. On 8 March 2024, Al Mousa scored his first goal for Al-Ittihad in a 2–1 win against Al-Okhdood.

On 4 June 2024, Al-Mousa joined Al-Ittihad on a permanent deal.

== International career ==
In June 2023, he took part in the Maurice Revello Tournament in France with Saudi Arabia.

== Career statistics ==
=== Club ===
As of match played 27 May 2024

Club	Season	League		King Cup		Asia		Other		Total	
Club	Season	Apps	Goals	Apps	Goals	Apps	Goals	Apps	Goals	Apps	Goals
Al-Ettifaq	2021–22	0	0	0	0	—		—		0	0
Al-Ettifaq	2022–23	19	0	1	0	—		—		20	0
Al-Ettifaq	2023–24	1	0	1	0	—		—		2	0
Al-Ettifaq	Total	20	0	2	0	0	0	0	0	22	0
Al-Ittihad (loan)	2023–24	10	1	1	0	2	0	0	0	13	1
Career totals		30	1	3	0	2	0	0	0	35	1

== Honours ==
Al-Ittihad

- Saudi Pro League: 2024–25
- King's Cup: 2024–25

Individual

- Saudi Professional League Young Player of the Month: March 2023
