= Muath Faqeehi =

Saudi Arabian footballer (born 2002)

Personal information
- Full name: Muath bin Abdulaziz bin Ahmad Faqeehi
- Date of birth: 30 May 2002 (age 24)
- Place of birth: Riyadh, Saudi Arabia
- Height: 1.88 m (6 ft 2 in)
- Position: Left-back

Team information
- Current team: Al-Ittihad
- Number: 42

Youth career
- –2022: Al-Hilal

Senior career*
Years	Team	Apps	(Gls)
2022–2024	Al-Hilal	4	(0)
2023–2024	→ Al-Taawoun (loan)	24	(0)
2024–	Al-Ittihad	19	(0)
2026	→ Al-Okhdood (loan)	13	(0)

International career^{‡}
2022–	Saudi Arabia U23	1	(0)
2023–	Saudi Arabia	1	(0)
- * Club domestic league appearances and goals as of 30 October 2026 ‡ National team caps and goals as of 16 November 2023

Muath Faqeehi (Arabic: معاذ فقيهي; born 30 May 2002) is a Saudi Arabian professional footballer who plays as a left back for Saudi Pro League club Al-Ittihad and the Saudi Arabia national team.

== Club career ==
Born in Riyadh, Faqeehi trained in the Al-Hilal youth team. He was promoted to the first team for the 2022–23 season. He made his professional debut on 21 December 2022 in the King Cup match against Al-Ettifaq. Three weeks later, he made his debut in the Saudi Pro League against Al-Adalah, replacing Nasser Al-Dawsari in the 87th minute.

On 23 July 2023, he joined Al-Taawoun on a one-year loan deal. In September 2023, he was awarded the "Young Player of the Month" award.

On 21 July 2024, Faqeehi joined Al-Ittihad on a four-year deal.

On 31 January 2026, he joined Al-Okhdood on a six-month loan deal.

== International career ==
In November 2023, Faqeehi received his first call-up to the Saudi Arabia national team. He made his international debut on 16 November 2023 while starting in Saudi Arabia's 4–0 home win against Pakistan as part of 2026 FIFA World Cup qualification.

== Honours ==
Al-Hilal

- King Cup: 2022–23

Al-Ittihad

- Saudi Pro League: 2024–25
- King's Cup: 2024–25

Individual

- Saudi Pro League Rising Star of the Month: September 2023
