= 2018–19 Al-Ittihad Club season =

Al-Ittihad
2018–19 season
- President: Nawaf Al-Mugairen (until 26 November 2018); Loay Nazer (from 27 November 2018)
- Manager: Ramón Díaz (until 15 September); Slaven Bilić (from 27 September until 24 February); José Luis Sierra (from 24 February)
- Stadium: King Abdullah Sports City
- SPL: 10th
- Super Cup: Runners-up (knocked out by Al-Hilal)
- King Cup: Runners-up (knocked out by Al-Taawoun)
- Champions League: Round of 16
- Sheikh Zayed Cup: Round of 32 (knocked out by Al-Wasl)
- Top goalscorer: League: Fahad Al-Muwallad (11); All: Romarinho (18)
- Highest home attendance: 52,210 vs Al-Hilal (21 February 2019)
- Lowest home attendance: 15,905 vs Al-Hazem (2 December 2018)
- Average home league attendance: 33,482
Home colours	Away colours	Third colours

The 2018–19 season was Al-Ittihad's 43rd consecutive season in the top flight of Saudi football and 92nd year in existence as a football club. Along with the Pro League, the club competed in the King Cup, the Sheikh Zayed Cup, and the Champions League. The season covers the period from 1 July 2018 to 30 June 2019.

== Players ==
=== Squad information ===
As of 7 January 2019

Note: Flags indicate national team as defined under FIFA eligibility rules; some limited exceptions apply. Players may hold more than one non-FIFA nationality.

No.	Pos.	Nation	Player
1	GK	KSA	Rakan Al-Najjar
2	DF	KSA	Abdullah Al-Ammar
3	DF	KSA	Tareq Abdullah
5	DF	AUS	Matthew Jurman
6	MF	KSA	Khaled Al-Sumairi
7	MF	KSA	Jaber Mustafa
8	MF	KSA	Fahad Al-Muwallad
9	FW	BRA	Romarinho
10	MF	CHI	Carlos Villanueva
12	GK	KSA	Assaf Al-Qarni
13	DF	KSA	Ahmed Assiri
14	DF	KSA	Ziyad Al-Sahafi
15	MF	KSA	Jamal Bajandouh
17	DF	MAR	Manuel da Costa
20	MF	MAR	Karim El Ahmadi
21	DF	KSA	Mohammed Reeman

No.	Pos.	Nation	Player
22	GK	KSA	Fawaz Al-Qarni
23	MF	CPV	Garry Rodrigues
24	DF	KSA	Ammar Al-Daheem
26	FW	KSA	Abdulaziz Al-Aryani
27	MF	BRA	Jonas
28	MF	KSA	Essam Al-Muwallad
30	DF	KSA	Awn Al-Saluli
31	DF	KSA	Mansour Al-Harbi
33	MF	KSA	Omar Al Jadaani
34	GK	BRA	Marcelo Grohe
35	MF	CIV	Sékou Sanogo
44	GK	KSA	Amin Bukhari
45	FW	SRB	Aleksandar Pešić
49	FW	KSA	Abdulrahman Al-Ghamdi
66	DF	KSA	Saud Abdulhamid
99	FW	SRB	Aleksandar Prijović

== Transfers ==
=== In ===
Date	Pos.	Name	Previous club	Fee	Source
8 June 2018	MF	(Saudi Arabia) Jaber Mustafa	(Saudi Arabia) Al-Shabab	Undisclosed	
9 June 2018	DF	(Saudi Arabia) Abdullah Al-Shammari	(Saudi Arabia) Al-Taawoun	Undisclosed	
9 June 2018	DF	(Saudi Arabia) Hassan Muath	(Saudi Arabia) Al-Fayha	Free	
8 July 2018	DF	(Australia) Matthew Jurman	(South Korea) Suwon Samsung Bluewings	€1,000,000	
9 July 2018	MF	(Brazil) Jonas	(Brazil) Flamengo	€2,000,000	
10 July 2018	MF	(Morocco) Karim El Ahmadi	(Netherlands) Feyenoord	Free	
11 July 2018	FW	(Serbia) Aleksandar Pešić	(Serbia) Red Star Belgrade	€4,200,000	
17 July 2018	DF	(Brazil) Thiago Carleto	(Brazil) Athletico Paranaense	€2,300,000	
26 July 2018	DF	(Saudi Arabia) Mansoor Al-Harbi	(Saudi Arabia) Al-Ahli	Undisclosed	
9 August 2018	FW	(Brazil) Romarinho	(United Arab Emirates) Al Jazira	€7,000,000	
30 October 2018	MF	(Saudi Arabia) Hussain Al Hajoj	(Saudi Arabia) Al-Ansar	Undisclosed	
12 November 2018	MF	(Saudi Arabia) Abdulaziz Al-Duwaihi	(Saudi Arabia) Al-Najma	Undisclosed	
21 November 2018	DF	(Saudi Arabia) Muhannad Al-Shanqeeti	(Saudi Arabia) Ohod	Undisclosed	
21 December 2018	MF	(Ivory Coast) Sékou Sanogo	(Switzerland) Young Boys	€7,000,000	
2 January 2019	GK	(Brazil) Marcelo Grohe	(Brazil) Grêmio	€2,650,000	
3 January 2019	DF	(Saudi Arabia) Abdullah Al-Ammar	(Saudi Arabia) Al-Fateh	Undisclosed	
5 January 2019	DF	(Morocco) Manuel da Costa	(Turkey) Başakşehir	€4,500,000	
6 January 2019	MF	(Cape Verde) Garry Rodrigues	(Turkey) Galatasaray	€7,000,000	
10 January 2019	FW	(Serbia) Aleksandar Prijović	(Greece) PAOK	€10,000,000	
24 January 2019	MF	(Saudi Arabia) Abdulaziz Al-Bishi	(Saudi Arabia) Al-Faisaly	€3,000,000	
19 February 2019	FW	(Saudi Arabia) Nasser Al-Shamrani	(Saudi Arabia) Al-Shabab	Free	

=== Loans in ===
Date	Pos.	Name	Parent club	End date	Source
8 June 2018	MF	(Brazil) Valdívia	(Brazil) Internacional	31 December 2018	
26 July 2018	MF	(Saudi Arabia) Ali Al-Zaqaan	(Saudi Arabia) Al-Fateh	3 January 2019	
22 January 2019	DF	(Saudi Arabia) Yassin Barnawi	(Saudi Arabia) Al-Qadsiah	End of season	

=== Out ===
Date	Pos.	Name	New club	Fee	Source
4 June 2018	DF	(Saudi Arabia) Turki Al Jalvan	Released		
4 June 2018	DF	(Saudi Arabia) Faisel Al-Kharaa	Released		
4 June 2018	MF	(Kuwait) Fahad Al Ansari	(Kuwait) Al-Qadsia	End of loan	
4 June 2018	MF	(Saudi Arabia) Ahmed Al-Aoufi	Released		
4 June 2018	MF	(Saudi Arabia) Turki Al-Khodair	Released		
4 June 2018	MF	(Egypt) Kahraba	(Egypt) Zamalek	End of loan	
6 June 2018	DF	(Saudi Arabia) Yassin Hamzah	(Saudi Arabia) Al-Fateh	Free	
10 June 2018	MF	(Saudi Arabia) Rabee Sufyani	(Saudi Arabia) Al-Taawoun	Free	
11 July 2018	MF	(Saudi Arabia) Yahya Khormi	(Saudi Arabia) Al-Taawoun	Free	
22 July 2018	DF	(Saudi Arabia) Adnan Fallatah	(Saudi Arabia) Al-Qadsiah	Free	
23 July 2018	GK	(Saudi Arabia) Mohammed Al-Zahrani	(Saudi Arabia) Al-Jabalain	Free	
27 July 2018	DF	(Saudi Arabia) Majed Al-Khaibari	(Saudi Arabia) Al-Shoulla	Free	
28 July 2018	MF	(Saudi Arabia) Ibrahim Al-Shehri	(Saudi Arabia) Al-Ain	Free	
29 July 2018	GK	(Saudi Arabia) Ali Al-Ameri	(Saudi Arabia) Al-Kawkab	Free	
29 July 2018	GK	(Saudi Arabia) Hani Al-Nahedh	(Saudi Arabia) Al-Qaisumah	Free	
30 July 2018	MF	(Saudi Arabia) Omar Asem	(Saudi Arabia) Najran	Free	
9 August 2018	DF	(Saudi Arabia) Awadh Khrees	(Saudi Arabia) Al-Faisaly	Free	
14 August 2018	MF	(Saudi Arabia) Ahmed Al-Nadhri	(Saudi Arabia) Al-Fateh	Free	
25 August 2018	MF	(Yemen) Ahmed Belkhair	(Saudi Arabia) Al-Ain	Free	
6 September 2018	FW	(Tunisia) Ahmed Akaïchi	(Tunisia) Étoile du Sahel	Free	
26 December 2018	DF	(Saudi Arabia) Abdullah Al-Shammari	(Saudi Arabia) Al-Wehda	Free	
27 December 2018	DF	(Brazil) Thiago Carleto	Released	Free	
20 January 2019	DF	(Saudi Arabia) Bader Al-Nakhli	(Saudi Arabia) Al-Batin	Free	
24 January 2019	DF	(Saudi Arabia) Hassan Muath	(Saudi Arabia) Al-Shabab	Free	
4 February 2019	DF	(Saudi Arabia) Hussein Halawani	(Saudi Arabia) Al-Tai	Free	

=== Loans out ===
Date	Pos.	Name	Subsequent club	End date	Source
6 July 2018	FW	(Saudi Arabia) Turki Al Jadaani	(Saudi Arabia) Al-Ain	End of season	
15 July 2018	DF	(Saudi Arabia) Hussein Halawani	(Saudi Arabia) Al-Orobah	4 February 2019	
15 August 2018	FW	(Saudi Arabia) Maan Al-Hudifi	(Saudi Arabia) Al-Ansar	End of season	
23 August 2018	DF	(Saudi Arabia) Abdulrahman Al-Rio	(Saudi Arabia) Al-Hazem	End of season	
18 January 2019	MF	(Saudi Arabia) Ammar Al-Najjar	(Saudi Arabia) Al-Fateh	End of season	
23 January 2019	DF	(Saudi Arabia) Omar Al-Muziel	(Saudi Arabia) Al-Fayha	End of season	
23 January 2019	DF	(Saudi Arabia) Mohammed Qassem	(Saudi Arabia) Al-Fayha	End of season	
4 February 2019	MF	(Saudi Arabia) Hussain Al Hajoj	(Saudi Arabia) Al-Fayha	End of season	
8 February 2019	FW	(Serbia) Aleksandar Pešić	(South Korea) FC Seoul	30 June 2020	

== Pre-season and friendlies ==
24 July 2018 Friendly	Al-Ittihad (Saudi Arabia)	1–1	(Slovenia) Krka	Austria
17:00 CEST	Al-Muwallad 31'	Report	58'

27 July 2018 Friendly	Al-Ittihad (Saudi Arabia)	3–1	(United Arab Emirates) Al Wahda	Kaprun, Austria
16:00 CEST	Carleto 4'; Valdívia 81'; Akaïchi 87'		Batna 36'	Stadium: Stadio Alois Latini

1 August 2018 Friendly	Al-Ittihad (Saudi Arabia)	3–1	(United Arab Emirates) Fujairah	Kaprun, Austria
18:00 CEST	Assiri 31'; Al-Muwallad 36'; Valdívia 60'		Benyettou 7'	Stadium: Stadio Alois Latini

1 August 2018 Friendly	Al-Ittihad (Saudi Arabia)	1–1	(United Arab Emirates) Al Dhafra	Austria
18:00 CEST	Carleto 43'		12'

== Competitions ==
=== Overview ===
Competition	Record								Started round	Final position / round	First match	Last match
Competition	G	W	D	L	GF	GA	GD	Win %	Started round	Final position / round	First match	Last match
Professional League	30	9	7	14	44	45	−1	30.00	—	—	31 August 2018	16 May 2019
Super Cup	1	0	0	1	1	2	−1	0.00	Final		18 August 2018	
King Cup	6	5	0	1	17	9	+8	83.33	Round of 64	Runners-up	4 January 2019	2 May 2019
Sheikh Zayed Cup	2	0	2	0	1	1	+0	0.00	Round of 32		23 August 2018	30 September 2018
Champions League	6	3	2	1	13	9	+4	50.00	Group Stage	In Progress	4 March 2019	In Progress
Total	45	17	11	17	76	66	+10	37.78				

Updated to match played 21 May 2019
Source: Competitions

=== Super Cup ===
As champions of the 2018 King Cup, Al-Ittihad took on the 2017–18 Pro League winners, Al-Hilal, for the season-opening Saudi Super Cup.

18 August 2018 Final	Al-Hilal	2–1	Al-Ittihad	London, United Kingdom
19:30 BST	Carlos Eduardo 35'; Botía (yellow card) 44'; Rivas 62'	Report	Jonas (yellow card) 44'; El Ahmadi 67', (yellow card) 90+2'	Stadium: Loftus Road; Attendance: 16,300; Referee: Cüneyt Çakır (Turkey)

=== Pro League ===
==== League table ====
Pos	Team	Pld	W	D	L	GF	GA	GD	Pts	Qualification or relegation
8	Al-Raed	30	10	8	12	38	48	−10	38	
9	Al-Fateh	30	8	11	11	32	45	−13	35	
10	Al-Ittihad	30	9	7	14	44	45	−1	34	Qualification for Arab Club Champions Cup
11	Al-Ettifaq	30	8	9	13	40	55	−15	33	
12	Al-Fayha	30	9	5	16	36	52	−16	32	

Source: spl.com
Rules for classification: 1) Points; 2) Head-to-head points; 3) Head-to-head goal difference; 4) Total goal difference; 5) Total goals scored; 6) Play-off (only for deciding champion, relegation and AFC competitions participation).

==== Results summary ====
Overall								Home						Away					
Pld	W	D	L	GF	GA	GD	Pts	W	D	L	GF	GA	GD	W	D	L	GF	GA	GD
30	9	7	14	44	45	−1	34	4	5	6	23	22	+1	5	2	8	21	23	−2

Last updated: 16 May 2019.
Source: Competitive matches

==== Results by round ====
Round	1	2	3	4	5	6	7	8	9	10	11	12	13	14	15	16	17	18	19	20	21	22	23	24	25	26	27	28	29	30
Ground	A	H	A	H	A	H	A	H	A	H	H	H	A	H	A	A	H	A	H	A	H	A	H	A	A	H	A	H	H	A
Result	L	L	L	D	L	D	L	L	L	L	D	L	W	L	L	W	D	W	D	D	L	D	W	W	L	W	W	W	W	L
Position	15	16	15	16	16	16	16	16	16	16	16	16	15	15	15	15	15	15	15	15	15	15	14	13	13	13	12	11	10	10

Updated to match(es) played on 16 May 2019. Source: Competitive matches
A = Away; H = Home; W = Win; D = Draw; L = Loss

==== Matches ====
All times are local, AST (UTC+3).

Win Draw Loss Postponed

31 August 2018 1	Al-Shabab	1–0	Al-Ittihad	Riyadh
18:55	Al-Shamrani 79'	Report	Al-Zaqaan (yellow card) 87'	Stadium: Prince Faisal bin Fahd Stadium; Attendance: 9,885; Referee: Damir Skomina (Slovenia)

15 September 2018 2	Al-Ittihad	0–3	Al-Qadsiah	Jeddah
20:45	Romarinho (yellow card) 24'; Al-Daheem (yellow card) 52'	Report	Élton 4'; Al-Amri (yellow card) 13'; Barnawi (yellow card) 51'; Jorginho (yellow card) 53', (goal) 64'; Guy (yellow card) 55'; Bismark 81'	Stadium: King Abdullah Sports City; Attendance: 23,916; Referee: Milorad Mažić (Serbia)

20 September 2018 3	Al-Taawoun	5–3	Al-Ittihad	Buraidah
18:45	Al-Hussain 18', 65', (yellow card) 73'; Héldon 43'; Tawamba 75'; Al-Mousa (yellow card) 87'; Al-Absi (yellow card) 90+1'; Adam 90+5'	Report	Al-Muwallad 23', 37'; Assiri (yellow card) 50'; Al-Muziel (yellow card) 71'; Al-Aryani 84'	Stadium: King Abdullah Sport City Stadium; Attendance: 6,246; Referee: Simon Lee Evans (Wales)

26 September 2018 4	Al-Ittihad	2–2	Al-Wehda	Jeddah
20:35	Al-Sumairi (yellow card) 45'; Al-Aryani 53'; Villanueva 58'; Bajandouh (yellow card) 76'; Jurman (yellow card) 90'	Report	Anselmo (yellow card) 32'; Çolak 34'; Renato Chaves 60'	Stadium: King Abdullah Sports City; Attendance: 35,504; Referee: Cüneyt Çakır (Turkey)

4 October 2018 5	Al-Fateh	2–0	Al-Ittihad	Al-Hasa
18:05	Naâmani (yellow card) 24'; Oueslati 26'; Al-Fuhaid (yellow card) 34'; Al-Majhad (yellow card) 89'; Al-Nadhri (yellow card) 90+1'; Al-Ammar (yellow card) 90+8'; Hamzi 90+9'	Report	Jurman (yellow card) 53'; Al-Sahafi (red card) 63'	Stadium: Prince Abdullah bin Jalawi Stadium; Attendance: 6,323; Referee: Simon Lee Evans (Wales)

19 October 2018 6	Al-Ittihad	1–1	Ohod	Jeddah
20:00	Jonas (yellow card) 23'; Valdívia 72'	Report	Ohene (yellow card) 45+1' (yellow-red card) 53'; Ribamar 68'; Mohamad (yellow card) 75'; Besisi (yellow card) 81'; Abdulghani (yellow card) 85'; Aashor (yellow card) 90+7'	Stadium: King Abdullah Sports City; Attendance: 33,857; Referee: Viktor Kassai (Hungary)

25 October 2018 7	Al-Hilal	3–1	Al-Ittihad	Riyadh
20:30	Kanno 8' (pen.); Al-Bulaihi (yellow card) 47'; Gomis 74'; Botía (yellow card) 81'; Yasser Al-Shahrani (yellow card) 86'; Carlos Eduardo 90+5' (pen.)	Report	Pešić 19'; Al-Muziel (yellow card) 26'; Jurman (yellow card) 77'; Carleto (yellow card) 85'; Assiri (yellow card) 90+4'	Stadium: King Saud University Stadium; Attendance: 20,562; Referee: Viktor Kassai (Hungary)

1 November 2018 8	Al-Ittihad	1–2	Al-Raed	Jeddah
19:50	Al-Sumairi (yellow card) 59'; Assiri (yellow card) 77'; Al-Muwallad 90+8'	Report	Belkaroui 45'; Farhan (yellow card) 48'; Al-Shamekh 78'	Stadium: King Abdullah Sports City; Attendance: 20,250; Referee: Fabio Verissimo (Portugal)

10 November 2018 9	Al-Fayha	2–1	Al-Ittihad	Al-Majma'ah
17:50	Asprilla 16'; Tziolis (yellow card) 53', (goal) 59'; Bonilla (yellow card) 82'	Report	Muath (yellow card) 21'; Romarinho 23'; Jonas (yellow card) 69'; El Ahmadi (yellow card) 90+6'	Stadium: King Salman Sport City Stadium; Attendance: 2,156; Referee: Matthew Conger (New Zealand)

25 November 2018 10	Al-Ittihad	1–3	Al-Ahli	Jeddah
19:45	Al-Muwallad 7'; Al-Saloli (yellow card) 20'; Al-Muziel (yellow card) 79'; El Ahmadi (yellow card) 89'	Report	Al Somah 21'; Asiri 49', (yellow card) 62'; Díaz (yellow card) 59'; Said 76'	Stadium: King Abdullah Sports City; Attendance: 46,527; Referee: Milorad Mažić (Serbia)

2 December 2018 11	Al-Ittihad	2–2	Al-Hazem	Jeddah
18:15	Villanueva (yellow card) 31'; Romarinho 59'; Pešić (yellow card) 88'; Al-Harbi 90+1'	Report	Al-Ayyaf 3'; Al-Saiari 51'	Stadium: King Abdullah Sports City; Attendance: 15,905; Referee: Svein Oddvar Moen (Norway)

6 December 2018 12	Al-Ittihad	1–2	Al-Faisaly	Jeddah
19:40	El Ahmadi (yellow card) 47'; Muath (yellow card) 63'; Al-Daheem (yellow card) 90+1'; Al-Muwallad 90+5'	Report	Calderón 11', (yellow card) 88'; Rossi (yellow card) 29', (goal) 54'; Al-Shamrani (yellow card) 89'; Al-Qahtani (yellow card) 90+2'	Stadium: King Abdullah Sports City; Attendance: 23,379; Referee: Ovidiu Hațegan (Romania)

14 December 2018 13	Al-Batin	1–3	Al-Ittihad	Hafar al-Batin
17:45	Al-Johani (yellow card) 68'; Al-Ghamdi 90+3'	Report	Al-Ghamdi 5', (yellow card) 34'; Al-Daheem (yellow card) 30'; Al-Sumairi (yellow card) 43'; Romarinho 53'; Al-Muwallad 72'	Stadium: Al-Batin Club Stadium; Attendance: 6,000; Referee: Alan Kelly (Republic of Ireland)

21 December 2018 14	Al-Ittihad	1–2	Al-Nassr	Jeddah
18:25	Al-Muwallad (yellow card) 28', (goal) 49'; Qassem (yellow card) 90+1'	Report	Hamdallah 21' (pen.), 82' (pen.); Uvini (yellow card) 36'; Al-Jebreen (yellow card) 79'; Amrabat (yellow card) 90+8'	Stadium: King Abdullah Sports City; Attendance: 50,376; Referee: Viktor Kassai (Hungary)

29 December 2018 15	Al-Ettifaq	1–0	Al-Ittihad	Dammam
17:35	Hazazi (yellow card) 24'; Al-Kwikbi 26'; El Sayed (yellow card) 64'; Al-Sonain (yellow card) 77'	Report	Al-Jadaani (yellow card) 80' (yellow-red card) 90'; Al-Daheem (yellow card) 86'	Stadium: Prince Mohamed bin Fahd Stadium; Attendance: 12,817; Referee: Milorad Mažić (Serbia)

10 January 2019 16	Al-Qadsiah	0–1	Al-Ittihad	Khobar
19:50	Fatau (yellow card) 42'; Sharahili (yellow card) 70'; Jorge Silva (yellow card) 78'	Report	Romarinho 56'; Jonas (yellow card) 90+3'	Stadium: Prince Saud bin Jalawi Stadium; Attendance: 6,856; Referee: Mark Clattenburg (England)

29 January 2019 17	Al-Ittihad	0–0	Al-Shabab	Jeddah
20:20	Sanogo (yellow card) 32'; Abdulhamid (yellow card) 56'	Report		Stadium: King Abdullah Sports City; Attendance: 46,575; Referee: Bakary Gassama (Gambia)

4 February 2019 18	Al-Wehda	0–2	Al-Ittihad	Mecca
20:15	Bakshween (yellow card) 83'; Marcos Guilherme (yellow card) 86'; Al-Amri (yellow card) 90+5'	Report	da Costa 22'; Al-Muwallad 56' (pen.)	Stadium: King Abdul Aziz Stadium; Attendance: 15,708; Referee: Svein Oddvar Moen (Norway)

9 February 2019 19	Al-Ittihad	0–0	Al-Taawoun	Jeddah
20:15	Abdulhamid (yellow card) 32'; Al-Sahafi (yellow card) 79'; Al-Muwallad (yellow card) 90+1'	Report	Al-Absi (yellow card) 9'; Al-Zubaidi (yellow card) 40'; Sandro Manoel (yellow card) 66'; Al-Mufarrej (yellow card) 71'; Sufyani (yellow card) 90+2'	Stadium: King Abdullah Sports City; Attendance: 30,785; Referee: Ravshan Irmatov (Uzbekistan)

15 February 2019 20	Al-Raed	1–1	Al-Ittihad	Buraidah
20:20	Al-Meqren 7'	Report	Sanogo (yellow card) 56'; Al-Sahafi (yellow card) 88'; Al-Ghamdi 90+1'	Stadium: King Abdullah Sport City Stadium; Attendance: 7,449; Referee: Bartosz Frankowski (Poland)

21 February 2019 21	Al-Ittihad	0–2	Al-Hilal	Jeddah
20:25	El Ahmadi (yellow card) 70'; Al-Bishi (yellow card) 75'	Report	Gomis 67'; Al-Dawsari 82'; Degenek (yellow card) 90+4'	Stadium: King Abdullah Sports City; Attendance: 52,210; Referee: Danny Makkelie (Netherlands)

1 March 2019 22	Al-Ahli	1–1	Al-Ittihad	Jeddah
20:30	Baeza (yellow card) 73'; Al Somah 78'	Report	Al-Muwallad (yellow card) 3'; El Ahmadi (yellow card) 21'; Romarinho 70'	Stadium: King Abdullah Sports City; Attendance: 42,880; Referee: Damir Skomina (Slovenia)

8 March 2019 23	Al-Ittihad	2–0	Al-Fayha	Jeddah
20:30	Prijović 62' (pen.), 90'	Report		Stadium: King Abdullah Sports City; Attendance: 32,162; Referee: Jorge Sousa (Portugal)

16 March 2019 24	Al-Hazem	0–3	Al-Ittihad	Ar Rass
16:00	Bakhit (red card) 53'; Tsiskaridze (yellow card) 62'	Report	Villanueva 31'; Bajandouh (yellow card) 48'; Al-Muwallad (yellow card) 64', (goal) 90+4' da Costa 68'; El Ahmadi (yellow card) 76'	Stadium: Al-Hazem Club Stadium; Attendance: 2,292; Referee: Ovidiu Hațegan (Romania)

29 March 2019 25	Al-Faisaly	3–2	Al-Ittihad	Al Majma'ah
18:55	Igor Rossi (yellow card) 22'; Mendash 42'; Al-Shamrani 69'; Luisinho 90+1'	Report	da Costa 20'; Rodrigues 31'; El Ahmadi (yellow card) 33'	Stadium: King Salman Sport City Stadium; Attendance: 862; Referee: Pavel Královec (Czech Republic)

5 April 2019 26	Al-Ittihad	4–1	Al-Batin	Jeddah
20:45	Al-Muwallad (yellow card) 8', (goal) 23' (pen.); Bajandouh (yellow card) 30'; Abdulhamid (yellow card) 44'; Romarinho 59' da Costa 62'; Sanogo 90+3'	Report	Ounalli (yellow card) 29'; Crysan (yellow card) 61'; Baraka 82'	Stadium: King Abdullah Sports City; Attendance: 23,897; Referee: Ovidiu Hațegan (Romania)

13 April 2019 27	Al-Nassr	2–3	Al-Ittihad	Riyadh
18:50	Uvini (yellow card) 55'; Hamdallah 69', 74' (pen.)	Report	Sanogo (yellow card) 27'; Prijović 32', 43'; Al-Muwallad (yellow card) 51', (goal) 88'; Romarinho (yellow card) 61'; Jonas (yellow card) 68'; El Ahmadi (yellow card) 73'	Stadium: King Fahd International Stadium; Attendance: 30,014; Referee: Pavel Královec (Czech Republic)

18 April 2019 28	Al-Ittihad	2–0	Al-Ettifaq	Jeddah
20:45	Al-Bishi 31', 38'	Report	Kiss (yellow card) 64'; Salem (yellow card) 65' (yellow-red card) 88'	Stadium: King Abdullah Sports City; Attendance: 26,840; Referee: Szymon Marciniak (Poland)

11 May 2019 29	Al-Ittihad	6–2	Al-Fateh	Jeddah
22:30	Prijović 16', 66', 70'; Villanueva 18', 44'; Romarinho 22'	Report	Korzun (yellow card) 5'; Jovanović 8', 63'	Stadium: King Abdullah Sports City; Attendance: 40,047; Referee: Anastasios Sidiropoulos (Greece)

16 May 2019 30	Ohod	1–0	Al-Ittihad	Medina
22:30	Majrashi 9'; Al-Dhaw (yellow card) 78'; Mohamad (yellow card) 82'	Report	Sanogo (yellow card) 61'; Reeman (yellow card) 67'	Stadium: Prince Mohammed bin Abdul Aziz Stadium; Attendance: 5,000; Referee: Matthew Conger (New Zealand)

=== King Cup ===
All times are local, AST (UTC+3).

4 January 2019 Round of 64	Al-Jubail	1–3 (a.e.t.)	Al-Ittihad	Dammam
19:50	Adams 74' (pen.), (yellow card) 102'; Al-Aboud (yellow card) 87'	Report	Romarinho 45', 108'; Al-Sumairi (yellow card) 56'; Assiri 104'	Stadium: Prince Mohamed bin Fahd Stadium; Referee: Mohammed Al-Hoaish

16 January 2019 Round of 32	Al-Washm	1–2	Al-Ittihad	Shaqra
15:30	Saïed 10'; Al-Dawsari (yellow card) 14'	Report	Romarinho 45+2'; Muath (yellow card) 50'; Rodrigues (yellow card) 55' (yellow-red card) 56'; Mustafa 90+5'	Stadium: Al-Washm Club Stadium; Referee: Abdullah Dhafer

21 January 2019 Round of 16	Al-Taqadom	0–3	Al-Ittihad	Buraidah
18:20	Al-Johaim (yellow card) 79'	Report	Al-Ammar 2'; Romarinho 35', 42'; Al-Daheem (yellow card) 75'	Stadium: King Abdullah Sport City Stadium; Referee: Khaled Al-Teris

1 April 2019 Quarter-finals	Al-Ittihad	4–3	Al-Batin	Jeddah
20:35	Al-Sumairi (yellow card) 36'; Prijović 44' (pen.), 58'; Sanogo (yellow card) 52'; Al-Harbi 69'; Romarinho 72'; Villanueva (yellow card) 82'	Report	Al-Shammari 11'; Crysan 38'; Kanabah (yellow card) 74'; Jhonnattann 75', (yellow card) 82'; Al-Ghamdi (yellow card) 89'	Stadium: King Abdullah Sports City; Attendance: 15,214; Referee: Damir Skomina (Slovenia)

27 April 2019 Semi-finals	Al-Ittihad	4–2	Al-Nassr	Jeddah
19:25	El Ahmadi (yellow card) 34'; Prijović 44' da Costa (yellow card) 45+2'; Al-Muwallad 60', (yellow card) 71'; Assiri (yellow card) 91'; Romarinho 96', 106'	Report	Petros (yellow card) 43'; Hamdallah 66', 89' (pen.), (yellow card) 115'	Stadium: King Abdullah Sports City; Attendance: 43,375; Referee: Felix Brych (Germany)

2 May 2019 Final	Al-Ittihad	1–2	Al-Taawoun	Riyadh
20:45	Prijović 32'; El Ahmadi (yellow card) 71'	Report	Al-Absi 55'; Al-Mousa (yellow card) 60'; Petrolina (yellow card) 61'; Sandro Manoel (yellow card) 76'; Tawamba 90'	Stadium: King Fahd International Stadium; Attendance: 58,223; Referee: Néstor Pitana (Argentina)

=== AFC Champions League ===
==== Group stage ====
The group stage draw was made on 22 November 2018 in Kuala Lumpur. Al-Ittihad were drawn with Al-Wahda, Lokomotiv Tashkent, and Al-Rayyan.

Pos	Team	Pld	W	D	L	GF	GA	GD	Pts	Qualification	WAH	ITH	LOK	RAY
1	(United Arab Emirates) Al-Wahda	6	4	1	1	14	9	+5	13	Advance to knockout stage	—	4–1	3–1	4–3
2	(Saudi Arabia) Al-Ittihad	6	3	2	1	13	9	+4	11	Advance to knockout stage	1–1	—	3–2	5–1
3	(Uzbekistan) Lokomotiv Tashkent	6	2	1	3	10	11	−1	7		2–0	1–1	—	3–2
4	(Qatar) Al-Rayyan	6	1	0	5	9	17	−8	3		1–2	0–2	2–1	—

Source: AFC
Rules for classification: Group stage tiebreakers

4 March 2019 1	Al-Ittihad (Saudi Arabia)	5–1	(Qatar) Al-Rayyan	Jeddah, Saudi Arabia
20:35 UTC+3	Al-Muwallad 45', 78'; Al-Aryani 45+1'; Al-Sahafi 48'; Al-Ghamdi 70' (pen.)	Live Report; Stats Report	Viera 23'	Stadium: King Abdullah Sports City; Attendance: 54; Referee: Minoru Tōjō (Japan)
Note: The Al-Ittihad v Al-Rayyan match was played behind closed doors due to punishment by the AFC.

11 March 2019 2	Al-Wahda (United Arab Emirates)	4–1	(Saudi Arabia) Al-Ittihad	Abu Dhabi, United Arab Emirates
19:00 UTC+4	Barqesh 16'; Leonardo 52', 90+1'; Matar 80'; Al Ghaferi (yellow card) 85'; Ibrahim (yellow card) 90+4'	Live Report; Stats Report	Abdulhamid (yellow card) 1'; Al-Qarni (yellow card) 43'; Jurman (yellow card) 44'; Al-Shamrani 56'; Assiri (yellow card) 68'	Stadium: Al-Nahyan Stadium; Attendance: 2,779; Referee: Ahmed Al-Ali (Jordan)

9 April 2019 3	Al-Ittihad (Saudi Arabia)	3–2	(Uzbekistan) Lokomotiv Tashkent	Jeddah, Saudi Arabia
20:45 UTC+3	Al-Shamrani 48' (pen.); Al-Muwallad 50', 90+4' (pen.)	Live Report; Stats Report	Zoteev (yellow card) 47'; Iskanderov 70'; Rajevac 82'	Stadium: King Abdullah Sports City; Attendance: 50; Referee: Sivakorn Pu-udom (Thailand)
Note: The Al-Ittihad v Lokomotiv Tashkent match was played behind closed doors due to punishment by the AFC.

22 April 2019 4	Lokomotiv Tashkent (Uzbekistan)	1–1	(Saudi Arabia) Al-Ittihad	Tashkent, Uzbekistan
18:00 UTC+5	Abdukholiqov 36'; Đokić (yellow card) 55'; Tukhtakhodjaev (red card) 75'	Live Report; Stats Report	Romarinho 12'; Al-Muwallad (yellow card) 45+2'; Sanogo (yellow card) 83'	Stadium: Lokomotiv Stadium; Attendance: 4,267; Referee: Fu Ming (China)

7 May 2019 5	Al-Rayyan (Qatar)	0–2	(Saudi Arabia) Al-Ittihad	Doha, Qatar
21:30 UTC+3		Live Report; Stats Report	Al-Shamrani 62'; Romarinho 67'	Stadium: Jassim bin Hamad Stadium; Attendance: 1,096; Referee: Muhammad Taqi (Singapore)

21 May 2019 6	Al-Ittihad (Saudi Arabia)	1–1	(United Arab Emirates) Al-Wahda	Jeddah, Saudi Arabia
22:00 UTC+3	Romarinho 68'; Al-Shamrani (yellow card) 75'	Live Report; Stats Report	Al-Menhali 71'; Al Ghaferi (yellow card) 73'	Stadium: King Abdullah Sports City; Attendance: 30,166; Referee: Nawaf Shukralla (Bahrain)

=== Sheikh Zayed Cup ===
==== Round of 32 ====
24 August 2018 First leg	Al-Ittihad (Saudi Arabia)	1–1	(United Arab Emirates) Al-Wasl	Jeddah, Saudi Arabia
21:00 AST	El Ahmadi 31', (yellow card) 42'; Qassem (yellow card) 55' (yellow-red card) 73'	Report	Vinícius Lima 12'; Salmeen (yellow card) 84'	Stadium: King Abdullah Sports City; Attendance: 34,240; Referee: Lahlou Benbraham (Algeria)

30 September 2018 Second leg	Al-Wasl (United Arab Emirates)	0–0 (1a–1 agg.)	(Saudi Arabia) Al-Ittihad	Dubai, United Arab Emirates
20:00 GST		Report		Stadium: Zabeel Stadium; Attendance: 5,780; Referee: Ahmed Al-Kaf (Oman)

== Statistics ==
=== Appearances ===
Last updated on 21 May 2019.

No.	Pos	Nat	Player	Total		Pro League		King Cup		Sheikh Zayed Cup		Champions League		Super Cup	
No.	Pos	Nat	Player	Apps	Goals	Apps	Goals	Apps	Goals	Apps	Goals	Apps	Goals	Apps	Goals
Goalkeepers
1	GK	(Saudi Arabia) KSA	Rakan Al-Najjar	1	0	1	0	0	0	0	0	0	0	0	0
12	GK	(Saudi Arabia) KSA	Assaf Al-Qarni	11	0	7	0	0	0	2	0	1	0	1	0
22	GK	(Saudi Arabia) KSA	Fawaz Al-Qarni	33	0	22	0	6	0	0	0	5	0	0	0
28	GK	(Saudi Arabia) KSA	Amin Bukhari	0	0	0	0	0	0	0	0	0	0	0	0
Defenders
2	DF	(Saudi Arabia) KSA	Abdullah Al-Ammar	11	1	3+2	0	3	1	0	0	3	0	0	0
3	DF	(Saudi Arabia) KSA	Tareq Abdullah	3	0	2	0	0	0	1	0	0	0	0	0
4	DF	(Saudi Arabia) KSA	Yassin Barnawi	7	0	2	0	0	0	0	0	4+1	0	0	0
5	DF	(Australia) AUS	Matthew Jurman	18	0	11	0	0	0	0	0	5+1	0	1	0
13	DF	(Saudi Arabia) KSA	Ahmed Assiri	29	1	18	0	4	1	1	0	5	0	1	0
14	DF	(Saudi Arabia) KSA	Ziyad Al-Sahafi	23	1	14+2	0	3	0	1	0	3	1	0	0
17	DF	(Morocco) MAR	Manuel da Costa	16	4	11	4	4+1	0	0	0	0	0	0	0
21	DF	(Saudi Arabia) KSA	Mohammed Reeman	1	0	1	0	0	0	0	0	0	0	0	0
24	DF	(Saudi Arabia) KSA	Ammar Al-Daheem	8	0	5	0	1+1	0	1	0	0	0	0	0
30	DF	(Saudi Arabia) KSA	Awn Al-Saluli	6	0	4+1	0	0	0	1	0	0	0	0	0
31	DF	(Saudi Arabia) KSA	Mansour Al-Harbi	31	2	22+2	1	3	1	2	0	2	0	0	0
66	DF	(Saudi Arabia) KSA	Saud Abdulhamid	22	0	13+2	0	5	0	0	0	2	0	0	0
Midfielders
6	MF	(Saudi Arabia) KSA	Khaled Al-Sumairi	23	0	6+8	0	1+1	0	1	0	6	0	0	0
7	MF	(Saudi Arabia) KSA	Jaber Mustafa	9	1	1+4	0	1+3	1	0	0	0	0	0	0
8	MF	(Saudi Arabia) KSA	Fahad Al-Muwallad	30	16	20+1	11	3	1	0	0	3+2	4	1	0
10	MF	(Chile) CHI	Carlos Villanueva	43	4	25+3	4	5+1	0	2	0	3+3	0	1	0
15	MF	(Saudi Arabia) KSA	Jamal Bajandouh	28	0	15+4	0	1+2	0	1+1	0	3+1	0	0	0
20	MF	(Morocco) MAR	Karim El Ahmadi	32	2	24	0	4+1	0	2	1	0	0	1	1
23	MF	(Cape Verde) CPV	Garry Rodrigues	11	1	9	1	2	0	0	0	0	0	0	0
27	MF	(Brazil) BRA	Jonas	24	0	13+6	0	3	0	1	0	0	0	1	0
28	MF	(Saudi Arabia) KSA	Essam Al-Muwallad	4	0	0+1	0	0	0	0	0	1+2	0	0	0
33	MF	(Saudi Arabia) KSA	Omar Al Jadaani	3	0	0+2	0	0+1	0	0	0	0	0	0	0
35	MF	(Ivory Coast) CIV	Sékou Sanogo	21	1	7+4	1	5	0	0	0	4+1	0	0	0
77	MF	(Saudi Arabia) KSA	Abdulaziz Al-Bishi	15	2	5+5	2	0+1	0	0	0	4	0	0	0
Forwards
9	FW	(Brazil) BRA	Romarinho	41	18	24+3	7	4+2	8	1	0	4+2	3	1	0
25	FW	(Saudi Arabia) KSA	Nasser Al-Shamrani	7	3	0+2	0	0	0	0	0	5	3	0	0
26	FW	(Saudi Arabia) KSA	Abdulaziz Al-Aryani	13	3	1+7	2	1+1	0	0+1	0	1+1	1	0	0
49	FW	(Saudi Arabia) KSA	Abdulrahman Al-Ghamdi	24	3	8+10	2	1	0	2	0	2+1	1	0	0
99	FW	(Serbia) SRB	Aleksandar Prijović	15	11	9+2	7	3+1	4	0	0	0	0	0	0
Players sent out on loan this season
16	DF	(Saudi Arabia) KSA	Mohammed Qassem	3	0	0+1	0	1	0	0+1	0	0	0	0	0
32	DF	(Saudi Arabia) KSA	Omar Al-Muziel	8	0	8	0	0	0	0	0	0	0	0	0
38	MF	(Saudi Arabia) KSA	Ammar Al-Najjar	3	0	0+2	0	0+1	0	0	0	0	0	0	0
45	FW	(Serbia) SRB	Aleksandar Pešić	14	1	8+3	1	0	0	2	0	0	0	0+1	0
Player who made an appearance this season but have left the club
11	DF	(Saudi Arabia) KSA	Hassan Muath	11	0	4+1	0	2+1	0	1+1	0	0	0	1	0
25	MF	(Saudi Arabia) KSA	Ali Al-Zaqaan	6	0	0+3	0	0	0	0+2	0	0	0	0+1	0
29	MF	(Brazil) BRA	Valdívia	8	1	3+4	1	0	0	0	0	0	0	1	0
36	DF	(Brazil) BRA	Thiago Carleto	5	0	4	0	0	0	0	0	0	0	1	0

=== Goalscorers ===
Rank	No.	Pos	Nat	Name	Pro League	King Cup	Sheikh Zayed Cup	Champions League	Super Cup	Total
1	9	FW	(Brazil)	Romarinho	7	8	0	3	0	18
2	8	MF	(Saudi Arabia)	Fahad Al-Muwallad	11	1	0	4	0	16
3	99	FW	(Serbia)	Aleksandar Prijović	7	4	0	0	0	11
4	10	MF	(Chile)	Carlos Villanueva	4	0	0	0	0	4
4	17	DF	(Morocco)	Manuel da Costa	4	0	0	0	0	4
6	25	FW	(Saudi Arabia)	Nasser Al-Shamrani	0	0	0	3	0	3
6	26	FW	(Saudi Arabia)	Abdulaziz Al-Aryani	2	0	0	1	0	3
6	49	FW	(Saudi Arabia)	Abdulrahman Al-Ghamdi	2	0	0	1	0	3
9	20	MF	(Morocco)	Karim El Ahmadi	0	0	1	0	1	2
9	31	DF	(Saudi Arabia)	Mansour Al-Harbi	1	1	0	0	0	2
9	77	MF	(Saudi Arabia)	Abdulaziz Al-Bishi	2	0	0	0	0	2
12	2	DF	(Saudi Arabia)	Abdullah Al-Ammar	0	1	0	0	0	1
12	7	MF	(Saudi Arabia)	Jaber Mustafa	0	1	0	0	0	1
12	13	DF	(Saudi Arabia)	Ahmed Assiri	0	1	0	0	0	1
12	14	DF	(Saudi Arabia)	Ziyad Al-Sahafi	0	0	0	1	0	1
12	23	MF	(Cape Verde)	Garry Rodrigues	1	0	0	0	0	1
12	29	MF	(Brazil)	Valdívia	1	0	0	0	0	1
12	35	MF	(Ivory Coast)	Sékou Sanogo	1	0	0	0	0	1
12	45	FW	(Serbia)	Aleksandar Pešić	1	0	0	0	0	1
Own goal					0	0	0	0	0	0
Total					44	17	1	13	1	76

Last Updated: 21 May 2019

=== Assists ===
Rank	No.	Pos	Nat	Name	Pro League	King Cup	Sheikh Zayed Cup	Champions League	Super Cup	Total
1	10	MF	(Chile)	Carlos Villanueva	4	5	0	1	1	11
2	8	MF	(Saudi Arabia)	Fahad Al-Muwallad	7	0	0	3	0	10
3	49	FW	(Saudi Arabia)	Abdulrahman Al-Ghamdi	4	0	0	0	0	4
4	6	MF	(Saudi Arabia)	Khaled Al-Sumairi	1	0	0	2	0	3
4	9	FW	(Brazil)	Romarinho	3	0	0	0	0	3
4	23	MF	(Cape Verde)	Garry Rodrigues	2	1	0	0	0	3
4	35	MF	(Ivory Coast)	Sékou Sanogo	1	2	0	0	0	3
8	7	MF	(Saudi Arabia)	Jaber Mustafa	0	2	0	0	0	2
8	27	MF	(Brazil)	Jonas	2	0	0	0	0	2
8	31	DF	(Saudi Arabia)	Mansour Al-Harbi	0	1	0	1	0	2
8	77	MF	(Saudi Arabia)	Abdulaziz Al-Bishi	2	0	0	0	0	2
8	99	FW	(Serbia)	Aleksandar Prijović	1	1	0	0	0	2
13	3	DF	(Saudi Arabia)	Tareq Abdullah	1	0	0	0	0	1
13	11	DF	(Saudi Arabia)	Hassan Muath	1	0	0	0	0	1
13	14	DF	(Saudi Arabia)	Ziyad Al-Sahafi	0	1	0	0	0	1
13	15	MF	(Saudi Arabia)	Jamal Bajandouh	1	0	0	0	0	1
13	17	DF	(Morocco)	Manuel da Costa	0	1	0	0	0	1
13	20	MF	(Morocco)	Karim El Ahmadi	1	0	0	0	0	1
13	26	FW	(Saudi Arabia)	Abdulaziz Al-Aryani	0	0	0	1	0	1
13	32	DF	(Saudi Arabia)	Omar Al-Muziel	1	0	0	0	0	1
13	45	FW	(Serbia)	Aleksandar Pešić	1	0	0	0	0	1
13	66	DF	(Saudi Arabia)	Saud Abdulhamid	1	0	0	0	0	1
Total					34	14	0	8	1	57

Last Updated: 21 May 2019

=== Clean sheets ===
Rank	No.	Pos	Nat	Name	Pro League	King Cup	Sheikh Zayed Cup	Champions League	Super Cup	Total
1	22	GK	(Saudi Arabia)	Fawaz Al-Qarni	7	1	0	1	0	9
2	12	GK	(Saudi Arabia)	Assaf Al-Qarni	0	0	1	0	0	1
Total					7	1	1	1	0	10

Last Updated: 7 May 2019
