= 2019–20 Al-Ittihad Club season =

Al-Ittihad
2019–20 season
- President: Anmar Al-Hailiy
- Manager: José Luis Sierra (until 19 October); Henk ten Cate (from 4 November to 11 February); Fábio Carille (from 17 February)
- Stadium: King Abdullah Sports City
- Pro League: 11th
- King Cup: Round of 16
- Champions League: Quarter-finals
- Arab Club Champions Cup: Runners-up
- Top goalscorer: League: Romarinho (15); All: Romarinho (26)
- Highest home attendance: 54,390 vs Al-Hilal (27 August 2019)
- Lowest home attendance: 5,034 vs Al-Wasl (4 November 2019)
- Average home league attendance: 17,511
| Home colours | Away colours |

The 2019–20 season was Al-Ittihad's 44th consecutive season in the top flight of Saudi football and 93rd year in existence as a football club. The club participated in the Pro League, the King Cup, the AFC Champions League and the Arab Club Champions Cup.

The season covered the period from 1 July 2019 to 30 June 2020.

== Players ==
=== Squad information ===
As of 1 February 2020

Note: Flags indicate national team as defined under FIFA eligibility rules; some limited exceptions apply. Players may hold more than one non-FIFA nationality.

| No. | Pos. | Nation | Player |
|---|---|---|---|
| 1 | GK | KSA | Rakan Al-Najjar |
| 2 | DF | KSA | Abdullah Al-Ammar |
| 3 | DF | KSA | Tareq Abdullah |
| 4 | DF | KSA | Ziyad Al-Sahafi |
| 6 | MF | KSA | Khaled Al-Sumairi |
| 8 | MF | KSA | Fahad Al-Muwallad |
| 12 | GK | KSA | Assaf Al-Qarni |
| 13 | MF | TUN | Anice Badri |
| 14 | MF | KSA | Younes Abdulwahed |
| 15 | DF | BRA | Bruno Uvini |
| 16 | MF | KSA | Ali Al-Rie |
| 20 | MF | MAR | Karim El Ahmadi |
| 21 | DF | KSA | Abdulmohsen Fallatah |
| 22 | GK | KSA | Fawaz Al-Qarni |
| 23 | MF | KSA | Abdulrahman Al-Aboud |
| 24 | DF | KSA | Ammar Al-Daheem |

| No. | Pos. | Nation | Player |
|---|---|---|---|
| 25 | GK | KSA | Amin Al Bukhari |
| 26 | FW | KSA | Abdulaziz Al-Aryani |
| 27 | DF | KSA | Hamdan Al-Shamrani |
| 29 | DF | KSA | Muhannad Al-Shanqeeti |
| 31 | DF | KSA | Mansour Al-Harbi |
| 34 | GK | BRA | Marcelo Grohe |
| 37 | DF | MLI | Ahmed Emad Eldin |
| 49 | FW | KSA | Abdulrahman Al-Ghamdi |
| 66 | DF | KSA | Saud Abdulhamid |
| 70 | FW | KSA | Haroune Camara |
| 77 | MF | KSA | Abdulaziz Al-Bishi |
| 80 | FW | CIV | Wilfried Bony |
| 83 | MF | ARG | Leonardo Gil |
| 88 | MF | KSA | Abdulellah Al-Malki |
| 90 | FW | BRA | Romarinho |
| 99 | MF | KSA | Mohammed Al-Thani (on loan from Al-Faisaly) |

=== Out on loan ===
Note: Flags indicate national team as defined under FIFA eligibility rules; some limited exceptions apply. Players may hold more than one non-FIFA nationality.

| No. | Pos. | Nation | Player |
|---|---|---|---|
| 28 | MF | KSA | Essam Al-Muwallad (at Al-Bukayriyah until 30 June 2020) |
| 30 | DF | KSA | Awn Al-Saluli (at Al-Fayha until 30 June 2020) |
| 35 | MF | CIV | Sékou Sanogo (at Red Star Belgrade until 1 January 2021) |

| No. | Pos. | Nation | Player |
|---|---|---|---|
| 45 | FW | SRB | Aleksandar Pešić (at FC Seoul until 30 June 2020) |
| 55 | MF | KSA | Saher Al-Suraihi (at Al-Thoqbah until 30 June 2020) |
| — | MF | CPV | Garry Rodrigues (at Fenerbahçe until 30 June 2021) |

== Transfers and loans ==
=== Transfers in ===
| Entry date | Position | No. | Player | From club | Fee | Ref. |
|---|---|---|---|---|---|---|
| 12 May 2019 | DF | 27 | (Saudi Arabia) Hamdan Al-Shamrani | (Saudi Arabia) Al-Faisaly | $3,200,000 | |
| 2 July 2019 | MF | 88 | (Saudi Arabia) Abdulellah Al-Malki | (Saudi Arabia) Al-Wehda | Free | |
| 4 July 2019 | MF | 23 | (Saudi Arabia) Abdulrahman Al-Aboud | (Saudi Arabia) Al-Ettifaq | $3,200,000 | |
| 10 July 2019 | MF | 11 | (Argentina) Emiliano Vecchio | (Brazil) Santos | Free | |
| 10 July 2019 | MF | 19 | (Chile) Luis Jiménez | (Chile) CD Palestino | Free | |
| 14 July 2019 | DF | 21 | (Saudi Arabia) Abdulmohsen Fallatah | (Saudi Arabia) Al-Qadsiah | $800,000 | |
| 17 July 2019 | FW | 70 | (Saudi Arabia) Haroune Camara | (Saudi Arabia) Al-Qadsiah | $5,865,000 | |
| 1 January 2020 | MF | 83 | (Argentina) Leonardo Gil | (Argentina) Rosario Central | $1,500,000 | |
| 13 January 2020 | DF | 15 | (Brazil) Bruno Uvini | (Qatar) Al-Wakrah | Free | |
| 15 January 2020 | MF | 13 | (Tunisia) Anice Badri | (Tunisia) ES Tunis | $800,000 | |
| 28 January 2020 | FW | 80 | (Ivory Coast) Wilfried Bony | (Qatar) Al-Arabi | Free | |

=== Loans in ===
| Start date | End date | Position | No. | Player | From club | Fee | Ref. |
|---|---|---|---|---|---|---|---|
| 7 January 2020 | End of season | MF | 99 | (Saudi Arabia) Mohammed Al-Thani | (Saudi Arabia) Al-Faisaly | None | |

=== Transfers out ===
| Exit date | Position | No. | Player | To club | Fee | Ref. |
|---|---|---|---|---|---|---|
| 30 May 2019 | DF | 32 | (Saudi Arabia) Omar Al-Muziel | (Saudi Arabia) Al-Fayha | Free | |
| 1 July 2019 | DF | 13 | (Saudi Arabia) Ahmed Assiri | (Saudi Arabia) Al-Taawoun | Free | |
| 6 July 2019 | DF | – | (Saudi Arabia) Abdulrahman Al-Rio | (Saudi Arabia) Al-Wehda | Free | |
| 12 July 2019 | DF | 21 | (Saudi Arabia) Mohammed Reeman | (Saudi Arabia) Al-Raed | Free | |
| 13 July 2019 | MF | 15 | (Saudi Arabia) Jamal Bajandouh | (Croatia) Varaždin | Free | |
| 22 August 2019 | DF | 5 | (Australia) Matthew Jurman | | Released | |
| 31 August 2019 | MF | 7 | (Saudi Arabia) Jaber Mustafa | (Saudi Arabia) Al-Wehda | Undisclosed | |
| 18 September 2019 | MF | 19 | (Chile) Luis Jiménez | | Released | |
| 15 January 2020 | MF | 10 | (Chile) Carlos Villanueva | (Saudi Arabia) Al-Fayha | Free | |
| 31 January 2020 | DF | 17 | (Morocco) Manuel da Costa | (Turkey) Trabzonspor | Free | |

=== Loans out ===
| Start date | End date | Position | No. | Player | To club | Fee | Ref. |
|---|---|---|---|---|---|---|---|
| 13 July 2019 | 30 June 2021 | MF | 23 | (Cape Verde) Garry Rodrigues | (Turkey) Fenerbahçe | None | |
| 1 August 2019 | End of season | DF | 30 | (Saudi Arabia) Awn Al-Saluli | (Saudi Arabia) Al-Fayha | None | |
| 31 August 2019 | End of season | MF | 16 | (Saudi Arabia) Hussain Al Hajoj | (Saudi Arabia) Al-Adalah | None | |
| 31 August 2019 | End of season | MF | 55 | (Saudi Arabia) Saher Al-Suraihi | (Saudi Arabia) Al-Nojoom | None | |
| 21 January 2020 | 1 January 2021 | MF | 35 | (Ivory Coast) Sékou Sanogo | (Serbia) Red Star Belgrade | None | |
| 31 January 2020 | End of season | MF | 28 | (Saudi Arabia) Essam Al-Muwallad | (Saudi Arabia) Al-Bukayriyah | None | |

== Pre-season ==
| 16 July 2019 Friendly | Bolton Wanderers (England) | 2–3 | (Saudi Arabia) Al-Ittihad | Lostock |
| 13:00 BST | Oztumer 30'; Hall 65' | Report; Report | Prijović 13'; Al-Ghamdi 69'; Al-Bishi 72' | Stadium: Eddie Davies Academy; Attendance: Behind closed doors |

| 19 July 2019 Friendly | Bury (England) | 1–3 | (Saudi Arabia) Al-Ittihad | Manchester |
| 14:00 BST | 13' | Report | Al-Aboud 26'; Romarinho 52'; Jiménez 62' |

| 22 July 2019 Friendly | Leeds United XI (England) | 2–4 | (Saudi Arabia) Al-Ittihad | Leeds |
| BST | Kilch 35'; Alioski 71' | Report Report | Romarinho 4'; Al-Aboud 19'; Prijović 30'; Jiménez 88' |

| 24 July 2019 19:00 Friendly | Atherton Collieries (England) | 2–0 | (Saudi Arabia) Al-Ittihad | Atherton |
| BST | Grimshaw 33'; 60' | Report | | Attendance: 710 |

| 30 July 2019 Friendly | Al-Ittihad (Saudi Arabia) | 2–1 | (United Arab Emirates) Al-Wahda | Dubai, United Arab Emirates |
| | | Report |

== Competitions ==
=== Overview ===
| Competition | Record | | | | | | | |
| Competition | G | W | D | L | GF | GA | GD | Win % |
|---|---|---|---|---|---|---|---|---|
| Pro League | 30 | 9 | 8 | 13 | 42 | 41 | +1 | 30.00 |
| King Cup | 3 | 2 | 0 | 1 | 9 | 3 | +6 | 66.67 |
| AFC Champions League | 4 | 2 | 1 | 1 | 7 | 7 | +0 | 50.00 |
| Arab Club Champions Cup | 6 | 4 | 2 | 0 | 9 | 2 | +7 | 66.67 |
| Total | 43 | 17 | 11 | 15 | 67 | 53 | +14 | 39.53 |

Updated to match played 9 September 2020
Source: Competitions

=== Pro League ===
==== League table ====
| Pos | Team | Pld | W | D | L | GF | GA | GD | Pts |
|---|---|---|---|---|---|---|---|---|---|
| 9 | Abha | 30 | 11 | 5 | 14 | 41 | 52 | −11 | 38 |
| 10 | Damac | 30 | 9 | 8 | 13 | 37 | 52 | −15 | 35 (Note: Positions determined by head-to-head points: Damac: 9 pts; Al-Ittihad: 6 pts; Al-Taawoun: 3 pts.) |
| 11 | Al-Ittihad | 30 | 9 | 8 | 13 | 42 | 41 | +1 | 35 |
| 12 | Al-Taawoun | 30 | 10 | 5 | 15 | 33 | 40 | −7 | 35 |
| 13 | Al-Fateh | 30 | 8 | 9 | 13 | 42 | 49 | −7 | 33 |

Updated to match(es) played on 9 September 2020. Source: spl.com
Rules for classification: 1) Points; 2) Head-to-head points; 3) Head-to-head goal difference; 4) Total goal difference; 5) Total goals scored; 6) Fair-play points (Note: Head-to-head record is used only after all the matches between the teams in question have been played).

==== Results summary ====
| Overall | | | | | | | | Home | | | | | | Away | | | | | |
| Pld | W | D | L | GF | GA | GD | Pts | W | D | L | GF | GA | GD | W | D | L | GF | GA | GD |
|---|---|---|---|---|---|---|---|---|---|---|---|---|---|---|---|---|---|---|---|
| 30 | 9 | 8 | 13 | 42 | 41 | +1 | 35 | 5 | 3 | 7 | 25 | 21 | +4 | 4 | 5 | 6 | 17 | 20 | −3 |

Last updated: 9 September 2020.

==== Results by round ====
| Round | 1 | 2 | 3 | 4 | 5 | 6 | 7 | 8 | 9 | 10 | 11 | 12 | 13 | 14 | 15 | 16 | 17 | 18 | 19 | 20 | 21 | 22 | 23 | 24 | 25 | 26 | 27 | 28 | 29 | 30 |
|---|---|---|---|---|---|---|---|---|---|---|---|---|---|---|---|---|---|---|---|---|---|---|---|---|---|---|---|---|---|---|
| Ground | H | H | A | H | A | H | A | H | A | A | H | A | H | A | H | A | A | H | A | H | A | H | A | H | H | A | H | A | H | A |
| Result | W | W | L | L | W | L | L | L | L | W | L | L | D | D | D | D | W | L | L | W | D | L | L | L | W | D | W | D | D | W |
| Position | 2 | 7 | 11 | 14 | 10 | 6 | 8 | 11 | 13 | 12 | 13 | 13 | 13 | 13 | 12 | 12 | 12 | 13 | 13 | 12 | 12 | 13 | 13 | 13 | 12 | 12 | 11 | 11 | 11 | 11 |

Updated to match(es) played on 9 September 2020. Source:
A = Away; H = Home; W = Win; D = Draw; L = Loss

==== Matches ====
All times are local, AST (UTC+3).

Win Draw Loss Postponed

| 23 August 2019 1 | Al-Ittihad | 3–1 | Al-Raed | Jeddah |
| 20:50 | Prijović 11' (pen.); Romarinho 56', 90+5'; Abdulhamid (yellow card) 90+3' | Report | Al-Sahali 29'; Al-Zain (yellow card) 84' | Stadium: King Abdullah Sports City; Attendance: 31,781; Referee: Svein Oddvar Moen (Norway) |

| 13 September 2019 3 | Damac | 2–1 | Al-Ittihad | Abha |
| 18:50 | Iajour 2', 27'; Al-Dossari (yellow card) 20'; Rahmani (yellow card) 90+3' | Report | Vecchio 3'; El Ahmadi (yellow card) 90+1' | Stadium: Prince Sultan bin Abdul Aziz Stadium; Attendance: 14,680; Referee: Fabio Verissimo (Portugal) |

| 21 September 2019 4 | Al-Ittihad | 1–3 | Al-Hilal | Jeddah |
| 20:20 | Al-Malki (yellow card) 20' (yellow-red card) 82'; Romarinho 31'; Al-Sahafi (yellow card) 66'; Abdulhamid (yellow card) 73' | Report | Carlos Eduardo 15', 26'; Al-Shahrani (yellow card) 22'; Giovinco 89' | Stadium: King Abdullah Sports City; Attendance: 43,783; Referee: Cüneyt Çakır (Turkey) |

| 27 September 2019 5 | Al-Shabab | 1–2 | Al-Ittihad | Riyadh |
| 18:25 | N'Diaye (yellow card) 55'; Al-Sulayhem (yellow card) 60'; Al-Hamdan 80' | Report | Vecchio 21'; Al-Qarni (yellow card) 33'; Abdulhamid (yellow card) 34'; Fallatah (yellow card) 38'; Al-Sahafi (yellow card) 41'; Romarinho 74' | Stadium: King Fahd International Stadium; Attendance: 10,461; Referee: Pawel Raczkowski (Poland) |

| 1 October 2019 2 | Al-Ittihad | 3–1 | Al-Taawoun | Jeddah |
| 20:10 | Al-Bishi 4'; Vecchio 34'; Romarinho 59'; Al-Harbi (yellow card) 82' | Report | Machado (yellow card) 45+5'; Al-Shanqeeti (yellow card) 55'; Tawamba 67' | Stadium: King Abdullah Sports City; Attendance: 10,350; Referee: Anastasios Sidiropoulos (Greece) |

| 4 October 2019 6 | Al-Ittihad | 1–2 | Al-Hazem | Jeddah |
| 20:10 | Camara 6', (yellow card) 82' | Report | Al-Sowayed (yellow card) 10'; Alemão 45+3'; Fettouhi 83'; Asante (yellow card) 90+7' | Stadium: King Abdullah Sports City; Attendance: 20,244; Referee: Martin Pérez (Netherlands) |

| 19 October 2019 7 | Al-Wehda | 1–0 | Al-Ittihad | Mecca |
| 20:00 | Marcos Guilherme 33'; Anselmo (yellow card) 87' | Report | Al-Sahafi (yellow card) 60' | Stadium: King Abdul Aziz Stadium; Attendance: 10,756; Referee: Pol van Boekel (Netherlands) |

| 27 October 2019 8 | Al-Ittihad | 1–2 | Abha | Jeddah |
| 18:25 | El Ahmadi (yellow card) 35'; Romarinho 60' (pen.) | Report | Aouadhi 22', (yellow card) 45+2'; Gabriel (yellow card) 58', (goal) 73' | Stadium: King Abdullah Sports City; Attendance: 7,324; Referee: Kim Jong-hyeok (South Korea) |

| 31 October 2019 9 | Al-Ahli | 2–1 | Al-Ittihad | Jeddah |
| 19:50 | A. Asiri 13'; Sarić (yellow card) 18'; Al Somah 37'; Al-Owais (yellow card) 76' | Report | Abdulhamid (yellow card) 33'; Al-Sahafi 71'; Al-Bishi (yellow card) 90' | Stadium: King Abdullah Sports City; Attendance: 29,724; Referee: Artur Soares Dias (Portugal) |

| 24 November 2019 10 | Al-Ettifaq | 1–2 | Al-Ittihad | Dammam |
| 17:30 | Doukara (yellow card) 45+2' (yellow-red card) 72'; Al-Sahafi 62' (o.g.); Al Khairi (yellow card) 79' | Report | Al-Malki (yellow card) 34', (goal) 51'; Al-Harbi (yellow card) 70'; Yambéré 77' (o.g.); El Ahmadi (yellow card) 86' | Stadium: Prince Mohamed bin Fahd Stadium; Attendance: 11,217; Referee: Ivan Bebek (Croatia) |

| 14 December 2019 11 | Al-Ittihad | 1–2 | Al-Faisaly | Jeddah |
| 19:45 | Al-Shamrani (yellow card) 41' (yellow-red card) 74', (goal) 50'; Al-Malki (yellow card) 90' | Report | Luisinho (yellow card) 31'; William 43'; Hyland (yellow card) 55'; Silva (yellow card) 84'; Al-Ghamdi 85' | Stadium: King Abdullah Sports City; Attendance: 8,452; Referee: Pol van Boekel (Netherlands) |

| 19 December 2019 12 | Al-Fayha | 4–1 | Al-Ittihad | Al Majma'ah |
| 15:15 | Fernández 3' (pen.), 70' (pen.), 90+1'; Owusu 49'; Fallatah (yellow card) 84' | Report | Romarinho 24'; Al-Daheem (yellow card) 42'; Abdullah (yellow card) 70'; El Ahmadi (yellow card) 79' | Stadium: Al Majma'ah Sports City; Attendance: 2,586; Referee: Svein Oddvar Moen (Norway) |

| 28 December 2019 13 | Al-Ittihad | 1–1 | Al-Fateh | Mecca |
| 19:50 | Al-Shamrani (yellow card) 23'; Al-Muwallad (yellow card) 39'; Romarinho (yellow card) 39'; Al-Ghamdi 90+4'; Al-Malki (yellow card) 90+6' | Report | Wikheim (yellow card) 49'; Majrashi 74', (yellow card) 82'; Koval (yellow card) 89' | Stadium: King Abdul Aziz Stadium; Attendance: 5,112; Referee: István Kovács (Romania) |

| 10 January 2020 14 | Al-Nassr | 1–1 | Al-Ittihad | Riyadh |
| 20:05 | Petros 47'; Giuliano (yellow card) 74' | Report | El Ahmadi (yellow card) 35'; Romarinho 50'; Al-Malki (yellow card) 76' | Stadium: Prince Faisal bin Fahd Stadium; Attendance: 17,078; Referee: Jesús Gil Manzano (Spain) |

| 25 January 2020 15 | Al-Ittihad | 0–0 | Al-Adalah | Jeddah |
| 20:10 | Jonas (yellow card) 35'; Uvini (yellow card) 45'; Romarinho (yellow card) 47'; Gil (yellow card) 90+7' | Report | Al-Sultan (yellow card) 17'; Sharahili (yellow card) 80'; Al-Humayan (yellow card) 86'; Al-Yousef (yellow card) 90+3' | Stadium: King Abdullah Sports City; Attendance: 16,912; Referee: Matthew Conger (New Zealand) |

| 31 January 2020 16 | Al-Raed | 1–1 | Al-Ittihad | Buraidah |
| 20:15 | Fouzair (yellow card) 31'; Al-Zain 50' | Report | El Ahmadi (yellow card) 28'; Gil 80', (yellow card) 90+5' | Stadium: King Abdullah Sport City Stadium; Attendance: 6,522; Referee: Mohammed Al-Hoaish |

| 5 February 2020 17 | Al-Taawoun | 1–2 | Al-Ittihad | Buraidah |
| 18:25 | Héldon 44', (yellow card) 83'; Cássio (yellow card) 81'; Machado (yellow card) 85' | Report | Abdulhamid 28', (yellow card) 47'; Uvini 31'; Gil (yellow card) 45+2'; Al-Malki (yellow card) 81'; Grohe (yellow card) 90+1'; Al-Aryani (yellow card) 90+3' | Stadium: King Abdullah Sport City Stadium; Attendance: 5,986; Referee: István Kovács (Romania) |

| 10 February 2020 18 | Al-Ittihad | 1–2 | Damac | Jeddah |
| 20:20 | Bony 67'; Gil (yellow card) 70' | Report | Saidani 9', 12', (yellow card) 54'; Costa (yellow card) 14'; Al-Samti (yellow card) 31'; Chafaï (yellow card) 89' | Stadium: King Abdullah Sports City; Attendance: 7,404; Referee: Jochem Kamphuis (Netherlands) |

| 22 February 2020 19 | Al-Hilal | 1–0 | Al-Ittihad | Riyadh |
| 20:30 | Al-Dawsari (yellow card) 20'; Cuéllar (yellow card) 45'; Jahfali (yellow card) 50'; Al-Shahrani (yellow card) 73'; Carlos Eduardo 90+3' | Report | Al-Harbi (yellow card) 19'; Al-Sumairi (yellow card) 30'; Al-Malki (yellow card) 61'; Al-Shamrani (yellow card) 63' | Stadium: King Saud University Stadium; Attendance: 21,044; Referee: Szymon Marciniak (Poland) |

| 29 February 2020 20 | Al-Ittihad | 5–1 | Al-Shabab | Jeddah |
| 20:40 | Bony 16', (yellow card) 38'; Romarinho (yellow card) 19', (goal) 77', 80'; Al-Shamrani 20', 72' | Report | Diop 10'; N'Diaye (yellow card) 41' (yellow-red card) 74'; Sharahili (yellow card) 70'; Ben Mustapha (yellow card) 71'; Guanca (yellow card) 86' | Stadium: King Abdullah Sports City; Attendance: 23,746; Referee: Björn Kuipers (Netherlands) |

| 5 March 2020 21 | Al-Hazem | 1–1 | Al-Ittihad | Ar Rass |
| 18:45 | Al-Nashi (yellow card) 21'; Al-Zubaidi (yellow card) 48'; Cafú (yellow card) 63'; Alemão 90' | Report | Al-Malki (yellow card) 55'; Bony 61' (pen.) | Stadium: Al-Hazem Club Stadium; Attendance: 3,306; Referee: Bobby Madden (Scotland) |

| 11 March 2020 22 | Al-Ittihad | 1–2 | Al-Wehda | Jeddah |
| 20:45 | Romarinho 14'; Abdulhamid (yellow card) 18'; Badri (yellow card) 60'; Al-Aboud (yellow card) 74'; Gil (yellow card) 79' | Report | Anselmo 23'; Botía (yellow card) 46'; Goodwin (yellow card) 74'; Luisinho (yellow card) 77', (goal) 90'; Bakshween (yellow card) 86' | Stadium: King Abdullah Sports City; Attendance: 0 (Note: Matches from 7 March and onwards will be played behind closed doors due to concerns over the coronavirus outbreak.); Referee: István Kovács (Romania) |

| 4 August 2020 23 | Abha | 2–1 | Al-Ittihad | Abha |
| 19:15 | Al-Khathlan (yellow card) 42'; Aouadhi (yellow card) 45+2'; Tahrat 49'; Al-Najjar 85' (pen.) | Report | Romarinho 20'; Al-Sumairi (yellow card) 56'; El Ahmadi (yellow card) 84' | Stadium: Prince Sultan bin Abdul Aziz Stadium; Attendance: 0 Referee: Majed Al-Shamrani |

| 9 August 2020 24 | Al-Ittihad | 1–2 | Al-Ahli | Jeddah |
| 21:00 | Abdulhamid (yellow card) 20'; Al-Malki 41'; Al-Shamrani (yellow card) 57'; Al-Sumairi (yellow card) 62' | Report | Al Somah 30', 64', (yellow card) 39'; Sarić (yellow card) 45+1' | Stadium: King Abdullah Sports City; Attendance: 0 Referee: Srđan Jovanović (Serbia) |

| 14 August 2020 25 | Al-Ittihad | 1–0 | Al-Ettifaq | Jeddah |
| 20:50 | Uvini (yellow card) 26'; Al-Aboud (yellow card) 39'; Al-Muwallad 54' (pen.); Al-Sahafi (yellow card) 74'; Grohe (yellow card) 90'; Al-Bishi (yellow card) 90+3' | Report | Kiss (yellow card) 40'; Al-Robeai (yellow card) 60'; M'Bolhi (red card) 90+7' | Stadium: King Abdullah Sports City; Attendance: 0 Referee: Daniel Stefański (Poland) |

| 19 August 2020 26 | Al-Faisaly | 1–1 | Al-Ittihad | Al Majma'ah |
| 19:05 | El Jebli 44' (pen.); Hyland (yellow card) 88' | Report | Al-Shamrani 66'; Al-Muwallad (yellow card) 68' | Stadium: Al Majma'ah Sports City; Attendance: 0 Referee: Aleksei Kulbakov (Belarus) |

| 24 August 2020 27 | Al-Ittihad | 4–1 | Al-Fayha | Jeddah |
| 20:50 | Romarinho 3', 5'; Al-Muwallad 68' (pen.), 77'; Gil (yellow card) 71' | Report | Neto 28'; Al Freej (yellow card) 66'; Al-Juhaim (yellow card) 81' | Stadium: King Abdullah Sports City; Attendance: 0 Referee: Andrés Cunha (Uruguay) |

| 30 August 2020 28 | Al-Fateh | 1–1 | Al-Ittihad | Al-Hasa |
| 18:40 | te Vrede 42'; Al-Yousef (yellow card) 45+2'; Naji (yellow card) 55' | Report | Al-Bishi (yellow card) 19' (yellow-red card) 39'; Romarinho 47' | Stadium: Prince Abdullah bin Jalawi Stadium; Attendance: 0 Referee: Néstor Pitana (Argentina) |

| 4 September 2020 29 | Al-Ittihad | 1–1 | Al-Nassr | Jeddah |
| 20:35 | Bony 11' (pen.), (yellow card) 34'; Al-Aboud (yellow card) 26'; El Ahmadi (yellow card) 68' | Report | Hamdallah 4'; Musa (yellow card) 28'; Al-Khaibari (yellow card) 69'; Petros (yellow card) 87' | Stadium: King Abdullah Sports City; Attendance: 0 Referee: Ivan Bebek (Croatia) |

| 9 September 2020 30 | Al-Adalah | 0–2 | Al-Ittihad | Al-Hasa |
| 20:35 | Mandaw (yellow card) 7' | Report | Al-Muwallad 11'; Bony 28' (pen.); Abdulhamid (yellow card) 31' | Stadium: Prince Abdullah bin Jalawi Stadium; Attendance: 0 Referee: Khaled Al-Teris |

=== King Cup ===
All times are local, AST (UTC+3).

| 8 November 2019 Round of 64 | Al-Ittihad | 4–0 | Al-Riyadh | Jeddah |
| 20:00 | Romarinho 20', 49'; Prijović (yellow card) 55'; Al-Enezi 65' (o.g.); Vecchio 72' | Report | Al-Dossari (yellow card) 54' | Stadium: King Abdullah Sports City; Attendance: 8,288; Referee: Mohammed Al-Smail |

| 7 December 2019 Round of 32 | Al-Safa | 1–4 | Al-Ittihad | Dammam |
| 17:25 | Al Farid 20'; Al-Ahsaei (yellow card) 52' | Report | Prijović 32' da Costa 63'; Romarinho 68', 70' | Stadium: Prince Mohamed bin Fahd Stadium; Referee: Abdullah Al-Nuhait |

| 1 January 2020 Round of 16 | Al-Ittihad | 1–2 | Al-Fateh | Mecca |
| 18:30 | El Ahmadi 13'; Abdulwahed (yellow card) 48'; Al-Daheem (yellow card) 63' | Report | te Vrede 15'; Al-Shamrani 89' (o.g.) | Stadium: King Abdul Aziz Stadium; Referee: Ovidiu Hațegan (Romania) |

=== AFC Champions League ===
==== Knockout phase ====
===== Round of 16 =====
| 5 August 2019 First leg | Al-Ittihad (Saudi Arabia) | 2–1 | (Iran) Zob Ahan | Dubai, United Arab Emirates (Note: Matches between teams from Iran and Saudi Arabia are played on neutral venues due to deterioration of Iran–Saudi Arabia relations.) |
| 20:00 UTC+4 | Jiménez 9', (yellow card) 81'; Al-Sahafi 72'; Al-Shamrani (yellow card) 86' | Live Report; Stats Report | Haddadifar 7', (yellow card) 84'; Nejadmehdi (yellow card) 34'; Niknafs (yellow card) 40'; Fakhreddini (yellow card) 50' | Stadium: Zabeel Stadium; Attendance: 2,380; Referee: Ma Ning (China) |

| 12 August 2019 Second leg | Zob Ahan (Iran) | 3–4 (4–6 agg.) | (Saudi Arabia) Al-Ittihad | Doha, Qatar |
| 22:00 UTC+3 | Jiménez 53' (o.g.); Mohammadi 72', (yellow card) 90+4'; Chrisantus 83' | Live Report; Stats Report | Vecchio 45+1'; Sadeghi 54' (o.g.); Romarinho 64', 70'; Al-Malki (yellow card) 89' | Stadium: Grand Hamad Stadium; Attendance: 700; Referee: Adham Makhadmeh (Jordan) |

===== Quarter-finals =====
| 27 August 2019 First leg | Al-Ittihad (Saudi Arabia) | 0–0 | (Saudi Arabia) Al-Hilal | Jeddah, Saudi Arabia |
| 20:45 UTC+3 | Abdulhamid (yellow card) 75' | Live Report; Stats Report | Kanno (yellow card) 45+1' | Stadium: King Abdullah Sports City; Attendance: 54,390; Referee: Chris Beath (Australia) |

| 17 September 2019 Second leg | Al-Hilal (Saudi Arabia) | 3–1 (3–1 agg.) | (Saudi Arabia) Al-Ittihad | Riyadh, Saudi Arabia |
| 20:00 UTC+3 | Al-Faraj (yellow card) 22'; Carrillo 44'; S. Al-Dawsari 48'; Giovinco 78' | Live Report; Stats Report | Al-Sahafi 10', (yellow card) 50'; Villanueva (yellow card) 54'; Vecchio (yellow card) 75' | Stadium: King Saud University Stadium; Attendance: 22,916; Referee: Ryuji Sato (Japan) |

=== Arab Club Champions Cup ===
==== Round of 32 ====
| 20 August 2019 First leg | Al-Ittihad (Saudi Arabia) | 3–0 | (Lebanon) Al-Ahed | Jeddah, Saudi Arabia |
| 20:45 AST | Romarinho (yellow card) 14', (goal) 15' da Costa 28'; Prijović 38' | Report | Faour (yellow card) 11'; Al Salih (yellow card) 51'; Haidar (yellow card) 63' | Stadium: King Abdullah Sports City; Attendance: 19,822; Referee: Ali Al Samahiji (Bahrain) |

| 31 August 2019 Second leg | Al-Ahed (Lebanon) | 0–0 (0–3 agg.) | (Saudi Arabia) Al-Ittihad | Beirut, Lebanon |
| 19:00 EEST | | Report | | Stadium: Camille Chamoun Sports City Stadium; Referee: Gehad Grisha (Egypt) |

==== Round of 16 ====
| 23 October 2019 First leg | Al-Wasl (United Arab Emirates) | 1–2 | (Saudi Arabia) Al-Ittihad | Dubai, United Arab Emirates |
| 19:30 UAEST | Welliton 52' | Report | Romarinho 24', 90+2'; Abdulhamid (yellow card) 38' (yellow-red card) 54' | Stadium: Zabeel Stadium; Referee: Sadok Selmi (Tunisia) |

| 4 November 2019 Second leg | Al-Ittihad (Saudi Arabia) | 2–0 (4–1 agg.) | (United Arab Emirates) Al-Wasl | Jeddah, Saudi Arabia |
| 20:00 AST | Prijović 29' (pen.); Romarinho 55'; Al-Shamrani (yellow card) 56'; El Ahmadi (yellow card) 74' | Report | Khalil (yellow card) 44' | Stadium: King Abdullah Sports City; Attendance: 5,034; Referee: Ahmed Al-Kaf (Oman) |

==== Quarter-finals ====
| 15 January 2020 First leg | Al-Ittihad (Saudi Arabia) | 1–1 | (Morocco) Olympic Safi | Jeddah, Saudi Arabia |
| 20:15 AST | Al-Malki 47'; El Ahmadi (yellow card) 87' | Report | Al Gaadaoui 28'; Morabit (yellow card) 50' | Stadium: King Abdullah Sports City; Attendance: 30,544; Referee: Mustapha Ghorbal (Algeria) |

| 15 February 2020 Second leg | Olympic Safi (Morocco) | 0–1 (1–2 agg.) | (Saudi Arabia) Al-Ittihad | Safi, Morocco |
| 19:00 WAT | Morabit (yellow card) 45+1'; Bendaoud (yellow card) 51' | Report | Gil (yellow card) 45+1'; Romarinho 49'; Al-Bishi (yellow card) 84'; Abdulhamid (yellow card) 90+1' | Stadium: Stade El Massira; Referee: Ammar Al-Jeneibi (United Arab Emirates) |

== Statistics ==
=== Appearances ===
Last updated on 9 September 2020.

| No. | Pos | Nat | Player | Total | | Pro League | | King Cup | | Champions League | | Arab Club Champions Cup | |
| No. | Pos | Nat | Player | Apps | Goals | Apps | Goals | Apps | Goals | Apps | Goals | Apps | Goals |
Goalkeepers
| 1 | GK | (Saudi Arabia) KSA | Rakan Al-Najjar | 0 | 0 | 0 | 0 | 0 | 0 | 0 | 0 | 0 | 0 |
| 12 | GK | (Saudi Arabia) KSA | Assaf Al-Qarni | 2 | 0 | 1 | 0 | 0 | 0 | 0 | 0 | 1 | 0 |
| 22 | GK | (Saudi Arabia) KSA | Fawaz Al-Qarni | 18 | 0 | 12 | 0 | 0 | 0 | 4 | 0 | 2 | 0 |
| 25 | GK | (Saudi Arabia) KSA | Amin Al Bukhari | 0 | 0 | 0 | 0 | 0 | 0 | 0 | 0 | 0 | 0 |
| 34 | GK | (Brazil) BRA | Marcelo Grohe | 23 | 0 | 17 | 0 | 3 | 0 | 0 | 0 | 3 | 0 |
Defenders
| 2 | DF | (Saudi Arabia) KSA | Abdullah Al-Ammar | 4 | 0 | 2+1 | 0 | 1 | 0 | 0 | 0 | 0 | 0 |
| 3 | DF | (Saudi Arabia) KSA | Tareq Abdullah | 5 | 0 | 2+1 | 0 | 1 | 0 | 0 | 0 | 1 | 0 |
| 4 | DF | (Saudi Arabia) KSA | Ziyad Al-Sahafi | 21 | 3 | 14 | 1 | 1 | 0 | 4 | 2 | 2 | 0 |
| 15 | DF | (Brazil) BRA | Bruno Uvini | 17 | 1 | 16 | 1 | 0 | 0 | 0 | 0 | 1 | 0 |
| 21 | DF | (Saudi Arabia) KSA | Abdulmohsen Fallatah | 15 | 0 | 6+1 | 0 | 1 | 0 | 4 | 0 | 3 | 0 |
| 24 | DF | (Saudi Arabia) KSA | Ammar Al-Daheem | 5 | 0 | 3 | 0 | 1 | 0 | 0+1 | 0 | 0 | 0 |
| 27 | DF | (Saudi Arabia) KSA | Hamdan Al-Shamrani | 38 | 4 | 22+3 | 4 | 3 | 0 | 4 | 0 | 5+1 | 0 |
| 29 | DF | (Saudi Arabia) KSA | Muhannad Al-Shanqeeti | 7 | 0 | 5 | 0 | 1 | 0 | 0 | 0 | 1 | 0 |
| 31 | DF | (Saudi Arabia) KSA | Mansour Al-Harbi | 30 | 0 | 21+1 | 0 | 2 | 0 | 0+2 | 0 | 4 | 0 |
| 37 | DF | (Mali) MLI | Ahmed Emad Eldin | 0 | 0 | 0 | 0 | 0 | 0 | 0 | 0 | 0 | 0 |
| 66 | DF | (Saudi Arabia) KSA | Saud Abdulhamid | 33 | 1 | 23+1 | 1 | 1 | 0 | 4 | 0 | 4 | 0 |
Midfielders
| 6 | MF | (Saudi Arabia) KSA | Khaled Al-Sumairi | 24 | 0 | 7+7 | 0 | 1+1 | 0 | 4 | 0 | 2+2 | 0 |
| 8 | MF | (Saudi Arabia) KSA | Fahad Al-Muwallad | 8 | 4 | 7+1 | 4 | 0 | 0 | 0 | 0 | 0 | 0 |
| 13 | MF | (Tunisia) TUN | Anice Badri | 11 | 0 | 4+7 | 0 | 0 | 0 | 0 | 0 | 0 | 0 |
| 14 | MF | (Saudi Arabia) KSA | Younes Abdulwahed | 1 | 0 | 0 | 0 | 0+1 | 0 | 0 | 0 | 0 | 0 |
| 16 | MF | (Saudi Arabia) KSA | Ali Al-Rie | 2 | 0 | 0+1 | 0 | 0+1 | 0 | 0 | 0 | 0 | 0 |
| 20 | MF | (Morocco) MAR | Karim El Ahmadi | 33 | 1 | 26 | 0 | 2 | 1 | 0 | 0 | 5 | 0 |
| 23 | MF | (Saudi Arabia) KSA | Abdulrahman Al-Aboud | 26 | 0 | 14+6 | 0 | 1+1 | 0 | 0+1 | 0 | 3 | 0 |
| 32 | MF | (Saudi Arabia) KSA | Mohammed Al-Aoufi | 4 | 0 | 0+4 | 0 | 0 | 0 | 0 | 0 | 0 | 0 |
| 33 | MF | (Saudi Arabia) KSA | Awadh Al-Nasheri | 3 | 0 | 0+3 | 0 | 0 | 0 | 0 | 0 | 0 | 0 |
| 77 | MF | (Saudi Arabia) KSA | Abdulaziz Al-Bishi | 35 | 1 | 16+8 | 1 | 1 | 0 | 0+4 | 0 | 3+3 | 0 |
| 83 | MF | (Argentina) ARG | Leonardo Gil | 15 | 1 | 9+4 | 1 | 0 | 0 | 0 | 0 | 2 | 0 |
| 88 | MF | (Saudi Arabia) KSA | Abdulellah Al-Malki | 38 | 3 | 23+3 | 2 | 2 | 0 | 4 | 0 | 6 | 1 |
| 99 | MF | (Saudi Arabia) KSA | Mohammed Al-Thani | 0 | 0 | 0 | 0 | 0 | 0 | 0 | 0 | 0 | 0 |
Forwards
| 26 | FW | (Saudi Arabia) KSA | Abdulaziz Al-Aryani | 11 | 0 | 1+6 | 0 | 0+1 | 0 | 0+1 | 0 | 0+2 | 0 |
| 49 | FW | (Saudi Arabia) KSA | Abdulrahman Al-Ghamdi | 6 | 1 | 0+4 | 1 | 0+1 | 0 | 0 | 0 | 0+1 | 0 |
| 70 | FW | (Saudi Arabia) KSA | Haroune Camara | 22 | 1 | 6+11 | 1 | 0+1 | 0 | 0 | 0 | 2+2 | 0 |
| 80 | FW | (Ivory Coast) CIV | Wilfried Bony | 11 | 5 | 7+3 | 5 | 0 | 0 | 0 | 0 | 1 | 0 |
| 90 | FW | (Brazil) BRA | Romarinho | 42 | 26 | 30 | 15 | 3 | 4 | 4 | 2 | 5 | 5 |
Player who made an appearance this season but have left the club
| 5 | MF | (Brazil) BRA | Jonas | 5 | 0 | 2 | 0 | 2 | 0 | 0 | 0 | 1 | 0 |
| 9 | FW | (Serbia) SRB | Aleksandar Prijović | 17 | 4 | 6+4 | 1 | 3 | 1 | 0 | 0 | 4 | 2 |
| 10 | MF | (Chile) CHI | Carlos Villanueva | 18 | 0 | 10+2 | 0 | 1+1 | 0 | 4 | 0 | 0 | 0 |
| 11 | MF | (Argentina) ARG | Emiliano Vecchio | 17 | 5 | 9 | 3 | 1 | 1 | 4 | 1 | 2+1 | 0 |
| 17 | DF | (Morocco) MAR | Manuel da Costa | 11 | 2 | 7 | 0 | 1 | 1 | 0 | 0 | 3 | 1 |
| 19 | MF | (Chile) CHI | Luis Jiménez | 7 | 1 | 2 | 0 | 0 | 0 | 4 | 1 | 0+1 | 0 |
| 28 | MF | (Saudi Arabia) KSA | Essam Al-Muwallad | 3 | 0 | 1+1 | 0 | 0 | 0 | 0+1 | 0 | 0 | 0 |

=== Goalscorers ===
| Rank | No. | Pos | Nat | Name | Pro League | King Cup | Champions League | Arab Club Champions Cup | Total |
|---|---|---|---|---|---|---|---|---|---|
| 1 | 90 | FW | (Brazil) | Romarinho | 15 | 4 | 2 | 5 | 26 |
| 2 | 11 | MF | (Argentina) | Emiliano Vecchio | 3 | 1 | 1 | 0 | 5 |
| 2 | 80 | FW | (Ivory Coast) | Wilfried Bony | 5 | 0 | 0 | 0 | 5 |
| 4 | 8 | MF | (Saudi Arabia) | Fahad Al-Muwallad | 4 | 0 | 0 | 0 | 4 |
| 4 | 9 | FW | (Serbia) | Aleksandar Prijović | 1 | 1 | 0 | 2 | 4 |
| 4 | 27 | DF | (Saudi Arabia) | Hamdan Al-Shamrani | 4 | 0 | 0 | 0 | 4 |
| 7 | 14 | DF | (Saudi Arabia) | Ziyad Al-Sahafi | 1 | 0 | 2 | 0 | 3 |
| 7 | 88 | MF | (Saudi Arabia) | Abdulellah Al-Malki | 2 | 0 | 0 | 1 | 3 |
| 9 | 17 | DF | (Morocco) | Manuel da Costa | 0 | 1 | 0 | 1 | 2 |
| 10 | 15 | DF | (Brazil) | Bruno Uvini | 1 | 0 | 0 | 0 | 1 |
| 10 | 19 | MF | (Chile) | Luis Jiménez | 0 | 0 | 1 | 0 | 1 |
| 10 | 20 | MF | (Morocco) | Karim El Ahmadi | 0 | 1 | 0 | 0 | 1 |
| 10 | 49 | FW | (Saudi Arabia) | Abdulrahman Al-Ghamdi | 1 | 0 | 0 | 0 | 1 |
| 10 | 66 | DF | (Saudi Arabia) | Saud Abdulhamid | 1 | 0 | 0 | 0 | 1 |
| 10 | 70 | FW | (Saudi Arabia) | Haroune Camara | 1 | 0 | 0 | 0 | 1 |
| 10 | 77 | MF | (Saudi Arabia) | Abdulaziz Al-Bishi | 1 | 0 | 0 | 0 | 1 |
| 10 | 83 | MF | (Argentina) | Leonardo Gil | 1 | 0 | 0 | 0 | 1 |
| Own goal | | | | | 1 | 1 | 1 | 0 | 3 |
| Total | | | | | 42 | 9 | 7 | 9 | 67 |

Last Updated: 9 September 2020

=== Clean sheets ===
| Rank | No. | Pos | Nat | Name | Pro League | King Cup | Champions League | Arab Club Champions Cup | Total |
|---|---|---|---|---|---|---|---|---|---|
| 1 | 34 | GK | (Brazil) | Marcelo Grohe | 3 | 1 | 0 | 2 | 6 |
| 2 | 22 | GK | (Saudi Arabia) | Fawaz Al-Qarni | 0 | 0 | 1 | 1 | 2 |
| 3 | 12 | GK | (Saudi Arabia) | Assaf Al-Qarni | 0 | 0 | 0 | 1 | 1 |
| Total | | | | | 3 | 1 | 1 | 4 | 9 |

Last Updated: 9 September 2020
