= 2018 Saudi Super Cup =

2018 Saudi Super Cup كأس السوبر السعودي 2018
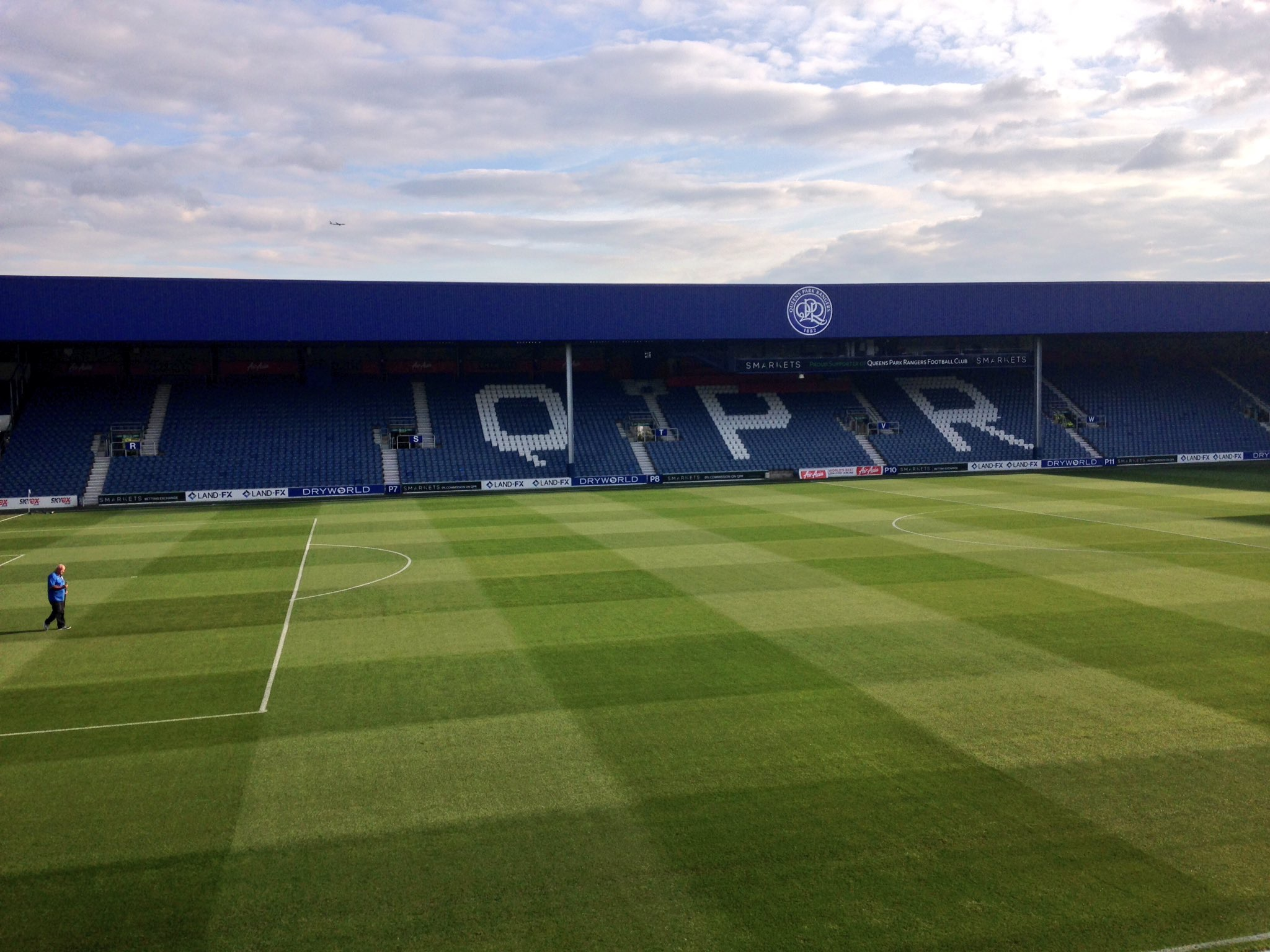
- Loftus Road in London hosted the match
Al-Hilal	Al-Ittihad
Pro League	King Cup
2	1
- Date: 18 August 2018
- Venue: Loftus Road, London, England
- Referee: Cüneyt Çakır (Turkey)
- Attendance: 16,300
- Weather: Cloudy; 20 °C (68 °F); 74% humidity

The 2018 Saudi Super Cup was the fifth edition of the Saudi Super Cup, an annual football match played between the winners of the previous season's Saudi Pro League and King Cup.

The match was played on 18 August 2018 between Al-Hilal, the winners of the 2017–18 Saudi Pro League, and Al-Ittihad, the winners of the 2018 King Cup.

It was held at Loftus Road in London, England, marking the second time the stadium hosted the Saudi Super Cup, and the third consecutive edition of the competition to be played in England.

Al-Hilal won the match 2–1, securing their second Saudi Super Cup title.

== Venue ==
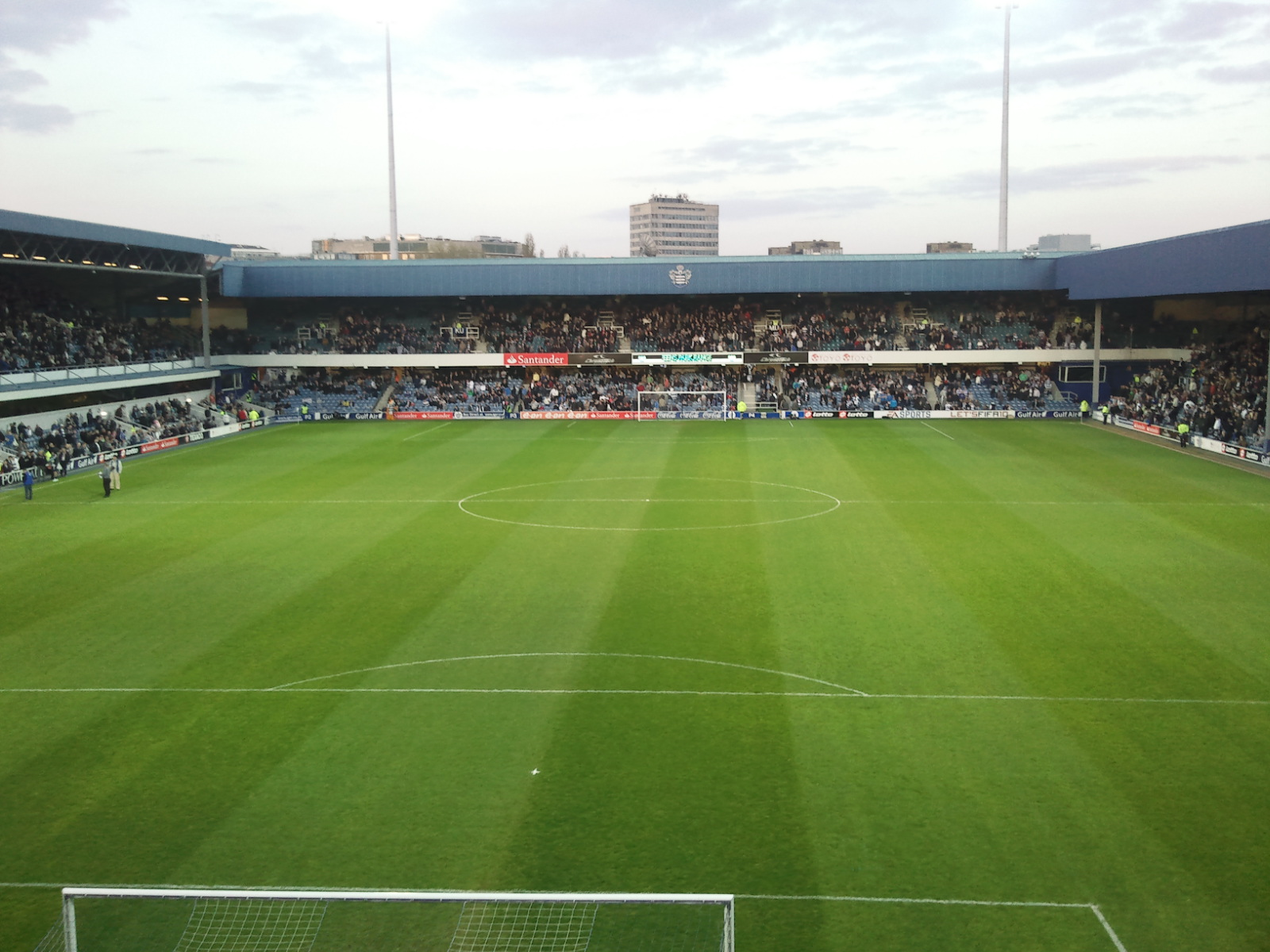
Loftus Road in London hosted the match

Loftus Road was announced as the venue of the final on 27 July 2018. This was the second time Loftus Road hosted the final and was the third time it was hosted in London.

Loftus Road was built in 1904 and has been used as the home stadium of Queens Park Rangers since 1917. Its current capacity is 18,439, and the record attendance was 35,353 in 1974.

== Background ==
This was Al-Hilal's third appearance in the competition. Al-Hilal won the 2015 edition and finished as runners-up in 2016. This was Al-Ittihad's second appearance in the competition. They finished as runners-up in the 2013 after losing to Al-Fateh.

The 2017 edition, which was supposed to be contested between Al-Hilal and Al-Ittihad, was canceled. The decision came at the request of then-Saudi national team manager Edgardo Bauza, who sought to adjust the domestic calendar to set up an ideal preparation program for the 2018 FIFA World Cup.

Al-Hilal qualified by winning the 2017–18 Saudi Pro League on the final matchday with a 4–1 victory over Al-Fateh. Al-Ittihad qualified by winning their ninth King Cup title, defeating Al-Faisaly 3–1 in the final.

This was the 141st meeting between the two sides in all competitions. Al-Hilal had won 56 times, while Al-Ittihad had won 42 times, with 42 draws between them. It was also the tenth final between them, with Al-Ittihad winning five times and Al-Hilal winning four times.

== Match ==
=== Details ===
18 August 2018
19:30 BST

Al-Hilal	2–1	Al-Ittihad
Carlos Eduardo 35'; Rivas 62'	Report	El Ahmadi 67'

Loftus Road, London
Attendance: 16,300
Referee: Cüneyt Çakır (Turkey)

Al-Hilal	Al-Ittihad

GK	26	(Oman) Ali Al-Habsi
RB	2	(Saudi Arabia) Mohammed Al-Breik
CB	4	(Spain) Alberto Botía	(yellow card) 44'
CB	5	(Saudi Arabia) Ali Al-Bulaihi	(yellow card) 90+3'
LB	12	(Saudi Arabia) Yasser Al-Shahrani
RM	19	(Peru) André Carrillo
CM	28	(Saudi Arabia) Mohamed Kanno
LM	29	(Saudi Arabia) Salem Al-Dawsari
AM	3	(Brazil) Carlos Eduardo (c)		(substituted off) 90+5'
AM	21	(United Arab Emirates) Omar Abdulrahman		(substituted off) 75'
CF	11	(Venezuela) Gelmin Rivas		(substituted off) 79'
Substitutes:
GK	1	(Saudi Arabia) Abdullah Al-Mayouf
DF	13	(Saudi Arabia) Hassan Kadesh		(substituted on) 90+5'
DF	22	(Saudi Arabia) Mohammed Al-Baqawi
DF	70	(Saudi Arabia) Mohammed Jahfali
MF	10	(Saudi Arabia) Mohammad Al-Shalhoub
MF	15	(Saudi Arabia) Ahmed Ashraf
MF	18	(Saudi Arabia) Nasser Al-Dawsari		(substituted on) 75'
MF	27	(Morocco) Achraf Bencharki
FW	77	(Syria) Omar Kharbin		(substituted on) 79'
Manager:
(Portugal) Jorge Jesus

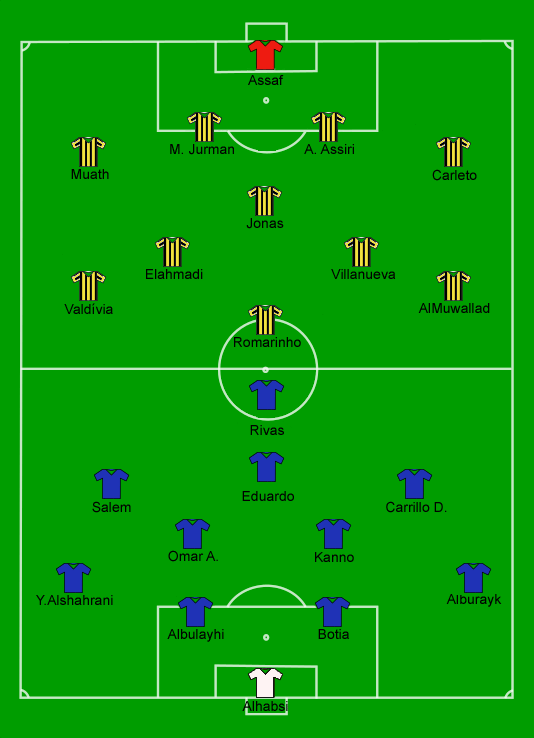

GK	12	(Saudi Arabia) Assaf Al-Qarni
RB	11	(Saudi Arabia) Hassan Fallatah
CB	5	(Australia) Matthew Jurman
CB	13	(Saudi Arabia) Ahmed Assiri (c)
LB	36	(Brazil) Thiago Carleto
DM	20	(Morocco) Karim El Ahmadi	(yellow card) 90+2'
DM	27	(Brazil) Jonas	(yellow card) 45+1'
AM	29	(Brazil) Valdívia		(substituted off) 46'
AM	10	(Chile) Carlos Villanueva
SS	8	(Saudi Arabia) Fahad Al-Muwallad
CF	9	(Brazil) Romarinho		(substituted off) 84'
Substitutes:
GK	1	(Saudi Arabia) Rakan Al-Najjar
DF	24	(Saudi Arabia) Ammar Al-Daheem
DF	31	(Saudi Arabia) Mansoor Al-Harbi
DF	32	(Saudi Arabia) Omar Al-Muziel
MF	6	(Saudi Arabia) Khaled Al-Sumairi
MF	15	(Saudi Arabia) Jamal Bajandouh
MF	25	(Saudi Arabia) Ali Al-Zaqaan	(yellow card) 86'	(substituted on) 84'
FW	45	(Serbia) Aleksandar Pešić		(substituted on) 46'
FW	49	(Saudi Arabia) Abdulrahman Al-Ghamdi
Manager:
(Argentina) Ramón Díaz

Assistant referees:
Bahattin Duran (Turkey)
Tarik Ongun (Turkey)
Fourth official:
Mohammed Al-Smail
Video assistant referee:
Mark Clattenburg (England)
Assistant video assistant referees:
Khaled Al-Teris

Match rules

- 90 minutes.
- Penalty shoot-out if scores still level.
- Nine named substitutes, of which up to three may be used.

=== Statistics ===
Overall
Statistic	Al-Hilal	Al-Ittihad
Goals scored	2	1
Total shots	19	13
Shots on target	7	4
Saves	3	5
Ball possession	47%	53%
Corner kicks	9	1
Fouls committed	20	16
Offsides	0	4
Yellow cards	2	3
Red cards	0	0

== See also ==
- 2017–18 Saudi Professional League
- 2018 King Cup
