= Essam Al-Muwallad =

Saudi association football player

Essam Al-Muwallad عصام المولد
Personal information
- Full name: Essam Mohammed Saleh Al-Muwallad
- Date of birth: March 11, 1999 (age 27)
- Place of birth: Saudi Arabia
- Height: 1.66 m (5 ft 5 in)
- Position: Midfielder

Team information
- Current team: Al-Houra
- Number: 12

Youth career
- –2019: Al-Ittihad

Senior career*
Years	Team	Apps	(Gls)
2019–2023	Al-Ittihad	3	(0)
2020	→ Al-Bukayriyah (loan)	13	(1)
2020–2021	→ Al-Hazem (loan)	1	(0)
2021–2022	→ Al-Kholood (loan)	2	(0)
2023–2024	Al-Ain		
2024–2025	Al-Entesar		
2025–	Al-Houra		
- * Club domestic league appearances and goals as of 31 January 2020

Essam Al-Muwallad (Arabic: عصام المولد; born 11 March 1999) is a Saudi professional footballer who plays for Al-Houra as a midfielder.

== Career ==
Al-Muwallad started his career with Al-Ittihad where he was promoted from the youth team to the first team. On 31 January 2019, Al-Muwallad signed his first professional contract with the club. On 9 April 2019, Al-Muwallad made his first-team debut in the AFC Champions League group stage match against Lokomotiv Tashkent. On 1 February 2020, Al-Muwallad joined Al-Bukayriyah on loan until the end of the season. He made his debut as well as score his first goal for the club on 12 February 2020 in the league match against Al-Ansar. On 9 October 2020, Al-Muwallad joined Al-Hazem on loan until the end of the season.

On 1 August 2023, Al-Muwallad joined Al-Ain on a free transfer.

== Career statistics ==
=== Club ===
As of match played 1 February 2020

Club	Season	League			King Cup		Asia		Other		Total	
Club	Season	Division	Apps	Goals	Apps	Goals	Apps	Goals	Apps	Goals	Apps	Goals
Al-Ittihad	2018–19	Pro League	1	0	0	0	4	0	0	0	5	0
Al-Ittihad	2019–20	Pro League	2	0	0	0	—		0	0	2	0
Al-Ittihad	Total		3	0	0	0	4	0	0	0	7	0
Al-Bukayriyah (loan)	2019–20	MS League	13	1	0	0	—		—		13	1
Al-Hazem (loan)	2020–21	MS League	1	0	0	0	—		—		1	0
Career totals			17	1	0	0	4	0	0	0	21	1

== Honours ==
Al-Hazem

- MS League: 2020–21
