= Ziyad Al-Sahafi =

Saudi Arabian footballer

Personal information
- Date of birth: February 3, 1994 (age 32)
- Place of birth: Jeddah, Saudi Arabia
- Height: 1.84 m (6 ft 1/2 in)
- Position: Defender

Team information
- Current team: Al-Fayha
- Number: 21

Youth career
- Al-Ittihad

Senior career*
Years	Team	Apps	(Gls)
2015–2023	Al-Ittihad	93	(5)
2022–2023	→ Al-Taawoun (loan)	10	(0)
2023–2024	Abha	20	(1)
2024–2025	Al-Riyadh	4	(0)
2025–	Al-Fayha	24	(2)

International career^{‡}
2019–2023	Saudi Arabia	15	(0)
- * Club domestic league appearances and goals as of 31 October 2026 ‡ National team caps and goals as of 12 January 2023

Ziyad Al-Sahafi (Arabic: زياد الصحفي; born 3 February 1994) is a Saudi Arabian footballer who plays as a defender for Saudi Pro League side Al-Fayha.

== Career ==
On 31 August 2022, Al-Sahafi joined Al-Taawoun on loan from Al-Ittihad.

On 7 September 2023, Al-Sahafi joined Abha.

On 2 August 2024, Al-Sahafi joined Al-Riyadh.

On 29 January 2025, Al-Sahafi joined Al-Fayha on a six-month deal.

== Career statistics ==
=== Club ===
As of match played 27 May 2024

Club	Season	League		King Cup		Asia		Other		Total	
Club	Season	Apps	Goals	Apps	Goals	Apps	Goals	Apps	Goals	Apps	Goals
Al-Ittihad	2015–16	14	1	2	0	6	0	2 (Note: Appearances in Crown Prince Cup)	0	24	1
Al-Ittihad	2016–17	0	0	0	0	—		0	0	0	0
Al-Ittihad	2017–18	11	1	5	0	—		—		16	1
Al-Ittihad	2018–19	16	0	3	0	7	3	1 (Note: Appearances in Arab Club Champions Cup)	0	27	3
Al-Ittihad	2019–20	14	1	1	0	—		2	0	17	1
Al-Ittihad	2020–21	20	1	2	0	—		1	0	23	1
Al-Ittihad	2021–22	18	1	3	0	—		0	0	21	1
Al-Ittihad	Total	93	5	16	0	13	3	6	0	128	8
Al-Taawoun	2022–23	10	0	0	0	—		—		10	0
Abha	2023–24	20	1	1	0	—		—		21	1
Career totals		123	6	17	0	13	3	6	0	159	9

== Honours ==
Al-Ittihad

- King Cup: 2018
- Crown Prince Cup: 2016–17
