= Jonas (footballer, born 1991) =

Brazilian footballer

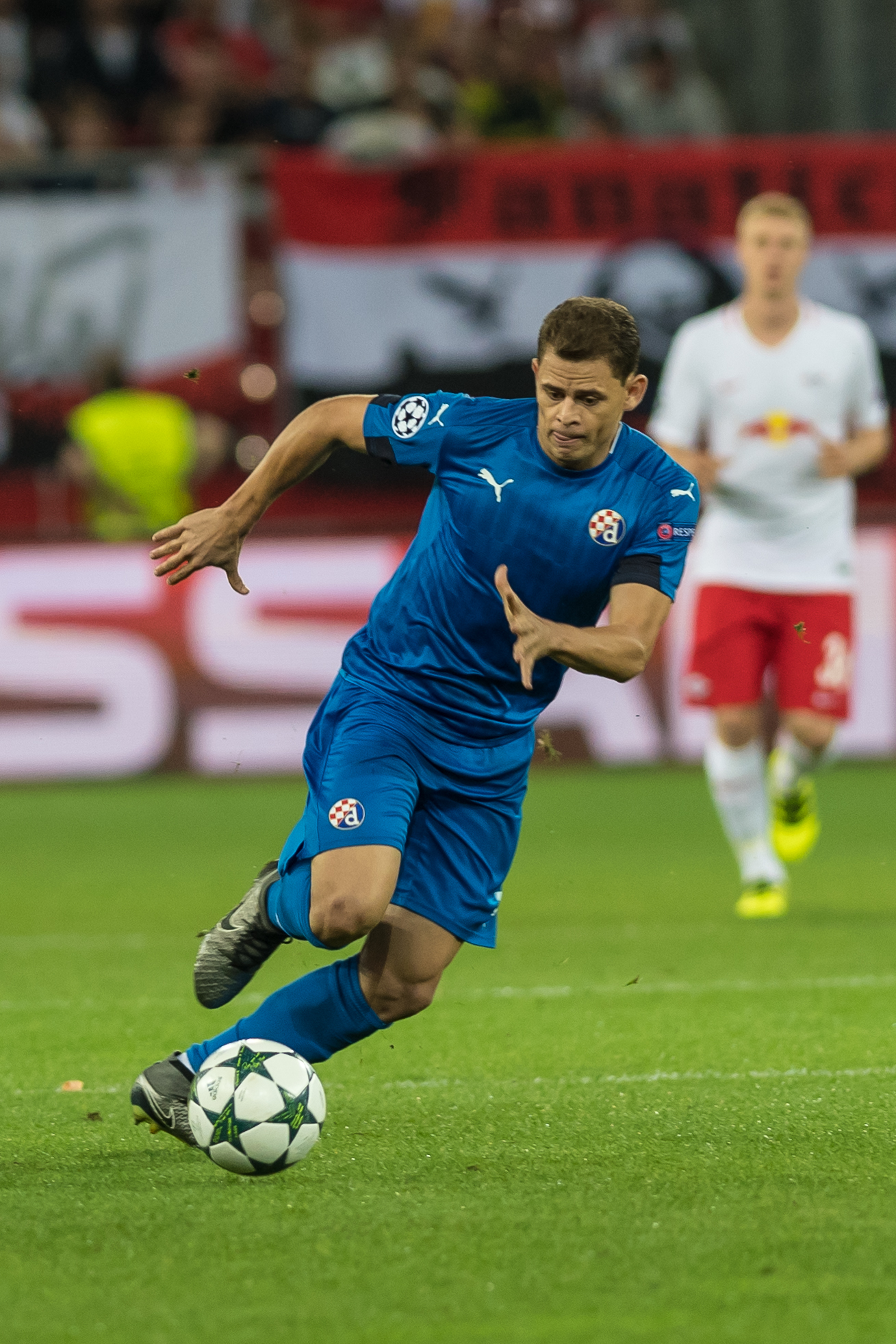
- Jonas playing for Dinamo Zagreb in 2016

Personal information
- Full name: Jonas Gomes de Sousa
- Date of birth: 3 October 1991 (age 35)
- Place of birth: Teresina, Brazil
- Height: 1.80 m (5 ft 11 in)
- Position: Defensive midfielder

Team information
- Current team: Retrô
- Number: 27

Youth career
- Fluminense-PI
- Cerâmica
- 2009–2010: Piauí

Senior career*
Years	Team	Apps	(Gls)
2011	Piauí	14	(1)
2012	Comercial-PI	16	(0)
2013–2014	Sampaio Corrêa	77	(0)
2015–2018	Flamengo	45	(1)
2016	→ Ponte Preta (loan)	12	(0)
2016	→ Dinamo Zagreb (loan)	13	(0)
2017	→ Coritiba (loan)	34	(2)
2018–2020	Al-Ittihad	21	(0)
2021	Bahia	13	(1)
2023–	Retrô	32	(1)
- * Club domestic league appearances and goals as of 29 September 2024

Jonas Gomes de Sousa (born 3 October 1991), simply known as Jonas, is a Brazilian footballer who plays as a defensive midfielder for Retrô.

== Club career ==
=== Early career ===
Born in Teresina, Piauí, Jonas started his career at Fluminense-PI, but later represented Cerâmica, as a youth. He subsequently returned to his native state, signing for Piauí in exchange of a motorcycle.

=== Sampaio Corrêa ===
In 2012 Jonas moved to cross-town rivals Comercial, appearing with the side in Série D. On 10 December 2012 he joined Sampaio Corrêa, until 2015.

Jonas was a regular starter for Sampaio during the club's promotion campaign to Série B, appearing in 23 matches. He made his debut in the category on 18 April 2014, starting in a 0–2 home loss against Paraná.

=== Flamengo ===
Jonas appeared in 30 matches in the season, being announced as the new player of Corinthians on 29 December 2014. However, a deal was not reached with Timão, and he signed a four-year deal with Flamengo on 26 January 2015.

==== Dinamo Zagreb (loan) ====
On 16 June 2016, Jonas signed with Dinamo Zagreb on a one-year loan deal, with an option for Dinamo Zagreb to buy.

==== Coritiba (loan) ====
On 27 December, he was loaned to Coritiba until the end of 2017 season.

== Career statistics ==
As of 25 October 2021

Club	Season	League			State League		Cup		Continental		Other		Total	
Club	Season	Division	Apps	Goals	Apps	Goals	Apps	Goals	Apps	Goals	Apps	Goals	Apps	Goals
Piauí	2011	Piauiense	—		14	1	—		—		—		14	1
Comercial-PI	2012	Série D	3	0	13	0	2	1	—		—		18	1
Sampaio Corrêa	2013	Série C	23	0	14	0	2	0	—		—		39	0
Sampaio Corrêa	2014	Série B	30	0	10	0	4	0	—		—		44	0
Sampaio Corrêa	Total		53	0	24	0	6	0	—		—		83	0
Flamengo	2015	Série A	19	0	8	1	5	0	—		—		32	1
Flamengo	2018	Série A	7	0	11	0	0	0	5 (Note: Appearance(s) in Copa Libertadores)	0	—		23	0
Flamengo	Total		26	0	19	1	5	0	5	0	—		55	1
Ponte Preta (loan)	2016	Série A	0	0	12	0	1	0	—		—		13	0
Dinamo Zagreb (loan)	2016–17	Prva HNL	13	0	—		1	0	8 (Note: Appearance(s) in UEFA Champions League)	0	—		22	0
Coritiba (loan)	2017	Série A	31	2	5	0	1	0	0	0	—		37	2
Al-Ittihad	2018–19	Saudi Professional League	19	0	—		3	0	0	0	2 (Note: One appearance in Saudi Super Cup, one appearance in Arab Club Champions Cup)	0	24	0
Al-Ittihad	2019–20	Saudi Professional League	2	0	—		2	0	0	0	1 (Note: Appearance(s) in Arab Club Champions Cup)	0	5	0
Al-Ittihad	Total		21	0	—		5	0	0	0	3	0	29	0
Bahia	2021	Série A	13	1	0	0	3	0	2 (Note: Appearance(s) in Copa Sudamericana)	0	3 (Note: Appearance(s) in Copa do Nordeste)	0	21	1
Career total			155	3	81	2	24	1	11	0	6	0	275	6

== Honours ==
Sampaio Corrêa

- Copa União do Maranhão: 2013
- Campeonato Maranhense: 2014

Flamengo

- Taça Guanabara: 2018

Dinamo Zagreb

- Croatian Football League: 2015–16
- Croatian Football Cup: 2015–16

Coritiba

- Campeonato Paranaense: 2017

Bahia

- Copa do Nordeste: 2021

Retrô

- Campeonato Brasileiro Série D: 2024
