= Gelmin Rivas =

Venezuelan footballer (born 1989)

Personal information
- Full name: Gelmin Javier Rivas Boada
- Date of birth: 23 March 1989 (age 37)
- Place of birth: Cumaná, Venezuela
- Height: 1.84 m (6 ft 1/2 in)
- Position: Forward

Senior career*
Years	Team	Apps	(Gls)
2009–2013	Deportivo Anzoátegui	80	(23)
2013–2015	Deportivo Táchira	76	(40)
2015–2016	Al-Ittihad	25	(19)
2016–2017	Sharjah	26	(13)
2017–2019	Al-Hilal	36	(10)
2019	Al-Rayyan	7	(4)
2019	Boston River	8	(2)
2020	Ankaragücü	7	(1)
2020	D.C. United	13	(2)
2021	Al-Shorta	9	(6)
2021	Rionegro Águilas	7	(1)
2022	Al-Khaldiya SC	?	(2)
2023	Deportivo La Guaira	23	(5)

International career
2010–2015	Venezuela	3	(0)
- * Club domestic league appearances and goals

Gelmin Javier Rivas Boada (born 23 March 1989) is a Venezuelan footballer who played as a striker.

== Club career ==
Rivas joined MLS side, D.C. United on 31 August 2020. On 6 September 2020, Rivas made his debut in a 0–0 draw against New York City FC. He scored his first goal for United on 24 October 2020, in a 2–1 win over Atlanta United. He was released by D.C. United on November 30, 2020.

== International career ==
Rivas made his senior international debut for the Venezuela national team on 29 May 2010 against Canada (1–1), after he came on as a substitute for Miku in the 90th minute of that game.

== Statistics ==
As of 9 November 2021.

Club	Season	League			Cup		League Cup		Continental		Other		Total	
Club	Season	Division	Apps	Goals	Apps	Goals	Apps	Goals	Apps	Goals	Apps	Goals	Apps	Goals
Deportivo Anzoátegui	2009–10	Venezuelan Primera División	16	3	—		—		1	0	—		17	3
Deportivo Anzoátegui	2010–11	Venezuelan Primera División	23	4	—		—		—		—		23	4
Deportivo Anzoátegui	2011–12	Venezuelan Primera División	25	8	—		—		4	0	—		29	8
Deportivo Anzoátegui	2012–13	Venezuelan Primera División	16	8	—		—		—		—		16	8
Deportivo Anzoátegui	Total		80	23	—		—		5	0	—		85	23
Deportivo Táchira	2012–13	Venezuelan Primera División	14	3	—		—		0	0	—		24	7
Deportivo Táchira	2013–14	Venezuelan Primera División	31	17	—		—		—		—		17	8
Deportivo Táchira	2014–15	Venezuelan Primera División	31	20	—		—		7	2	—		38	22
Deportivo Táchira	Total		76	40	—		—		7	2	—		83	42
Al-Ittihad	2015–16	Saudi Pro League	25	19	2	1	—		6	4	2	0	35	24
Sharjah	2016–17	UAE Pro League	26	13	2	3	6	4	—		—		34	20
Al Hilal	2017–18	Saudi Pro League	23	7	1	0	—		0	0	—		24	7
Al Hilal	2018–19	Saudi Pro League	13	3	3	4	—		—		1	1	17	8
Al Hilal	Total		36	10	4	4	—		0	0	1	1	41	15
Al Rayyan	2018–19	Qatar Stars League	7	4	0	0	—		6	6	—		13	10
Boston River	2019	Uruguayan Primera División	8	2	—		—		—		—		8	2
Ankaragücü	2019–20	Süper Lig	7	1	—		—		—		—		7	1
D.C. United	2020	MLS	13	2	—		—		—		—		13	2
Al-Shorta	2020–21	Iraqi Premier League	9	6	0	0	—		3	0	—		12	6
Rionegro Águilas	2021	Categoría Primera A	7	1	0	0	—		—		—		7	1
Al-Khaldiya	2021–22	Bahraini Premier League					—		—		—			
Al-Khaldiya	2022–23	Bahraini Premier League					—		—		—			
Al-Khaldiya	Total						—		—		—		41	15
Career total			294	121	8	8	6	4	21	12	3	1	332	146

== Honours ==
Anzoátegui

- Copa de Venezuela: 2012

Tachira

- Venezuelan Primera División: 2014–15

Al Hilal

- Saudi Professional League: 2017–18
- Saudi Super Cup: 2018
