= Jaber Issa =

Association football player

Personal information
- Full name: Jaber Issa Mohammed Mustafa
- Date of birth: 3 June 1997 (age 29)
- Height: 1.88 m (6 ft 2 in)
- Position: Defensive midfielder

Team information
- Current team: Al-Faisaly
- Number: 6

Senior career*
Years	Team	Apps	(Gls)
2018	Al-Shabab	0	(0)
2018	→ Villarreal B (loan)	0	(0)
2018–2019	Al-Ittihad	5	(0)
2019–2021	Al-Wehda	12	(0)
2021–2022	Al-Raed	9	(0)
2022	Van	1	(0)
2022–2024	Al-Jabalain	50	(0)
2024–	Al-Faisaly	0	(0)

International career
2017	Saudi Arabia	1	(0)
- * Club domestic league appearances and goals as of 31 May 2024

Jaber Issa Mohammed Mustafa (born 3 June 1997) is a Saudi Arabian football player who plays as a midfielder for Al-Faisaly. He represented the Saudi Arabia national football team on one occasion, in a 23rd Arabian Gulf Cup match against Oman.

== Club career ==
On 21 January 2018 Jaber Issa signed his first professional contract with Al-Shabab before immediately being loaned out to Villarreal B. Despite making no appearances for Al-Shabab, Jaber left the club on 9 June 2018 and joined fellow Pro League club Al-Ittihad signing a 2-year deal.

On 7 September 2022, Issa joined Al-Jabalain. On 7 June 2024, Issa joined Al-Faisaly.
