= Abdulaziz Al-Aryani =

Saudi Arabian footballer

Personal information
- Full name: Abdulaziz Hassan Al-Aryani
- Date of birth: December 13, 1996 (age 29)
- Place of birth: Jeddah, Saudi Arabia
- Height: 1.70 m (5 ft 7 in)
- Position: Striker

Youth career
- Al-Ittihad

Senior career*
Years	Team	Apps	(Gls)
2016–2022	Al-Ittihad	33	(6)
2020–2021	→ Damac (loan)	0	(0)
2021–2022	→ Al-Batin (loan)	18	(1)
2022–2023	Al-Riyadh	3	(0)
2023–2025	Ohod	25	(5)

International career
2017–2018	Saudi Arabia U23		
- * Club domestic league appearances and goals

Abdulaziz Al-Aryani (Arabic: عبد العزيز العرياني) (born 13 December 1996) is a Saudi Arabian footballer who plays as a striker.

== Honours ==
Al-Ittihad

- King Cup: 2018
- Crown Prince Cup: 2016–17
