= Mohammed Reeman =

Saudi Arabian footballer

Personal information
- Full name: Mohammed Reeman Al-Dossari
- Date of birth: 4 September 1996 (age 30)
- Place of birth: Jeddah, Saudi Arabia
- Height: 1.66 m (5 ft 5 1/2 in)
- Position: Left back

Youth career
- Al-Ittihad

Senior career*
Years	Team	Apps	(Gls)
2017–2019	Al-Ittihad	8	(0)
2019–2020	Al-Raed	0	(0)
2020–2022	Ohod	37	(0)
2022–2023	Al-Okhdood	28	(0)
2023–2024	Al-Najma		
- * Club domestic league appearances and goals as of 1 June 2023 ‡ National team caps and goals as of 29 June 2014

Mohammed Reeman (Arabic: محمد ريمان) (born 4 September 1996) is a Saudi Arabian footballer who plays as a left back.

== Career ==
On 14 June 2023, Reeman joined Al-Najma on a free transfer.

== Honours ==
Al-Ittihad

- King Cup: 2018
