= Manuel da Costa (footballer, born 1986) =

Moroccan footballer

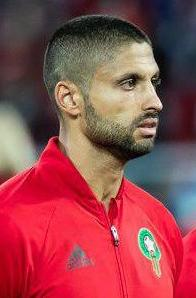
- Da Costa with Morocco at the 2018 FIFA World Cup

Personal information
- Full name: Manuel Marouane da Costa Trindade Senoussi
- Date of birth: 6 May 1986 (age 40)
- Place of birth: Saint-Max, France
- Height: 1.87 m (6 ft 2 in)
- Position: Defender

Senior career*
| Years | Team | Apps | (Gls) |
| 2004–2006 | Nancy | 10 | (1) |
| 2006–2008 | PSV | 16 | (1) |
| 2008–2009 | Fiorentina | 1 | (0) |
| 2009 | → Sampdoria (loan) | 2 | (0) |
| 2009–2011 | West Ham United | 31 | (3) |
| 2011–2013 | Lokomotiv Moscow | 15 | (2) |
| 2012–2013 | → Nacional (loan) | 16 | (2) |
| 2013–2015 | Sivasspor | 49 | (8) |
| 2015–2017 | Olympiacos | 40 | (4) |
| 2017–2018 | İstanbul Başakşehir | 23 | (3) |
| 2019–2020 | Al-Ittihad | 18 | (4) |
| 2020 | Trabzonspor | 11 | (1) |
| 2021 | BB Erzurumspor | 14 | (2) |
| 2022 | Waasland-Beveren | 7 | (0) |
| 2022 | F91 Dudelange | 1 | (0) |
| Total | | 254 | (31) |

International career
| 2006 | Portugal U20 | 3 | (0) |
| 2006–2008 | Portugal U21 | 22 | (2) |
| 2006–2008 | Portugal U23 | 1 | (0) |
| 2014–2019 | Morocco | 37 | (1) |
- * Club domestic league appearances and goals

Manuel Marouane da Costa Trindade Senoussi (Arabic: مانويل مروان دا كوستا ترينداد السنوسي; born 6 May 1986) is a former professional footballer who played as a centre-back. He has played for Nancy, PSV, Fiorentina, Sampdoria, West Ham United, Lokomotiv Moscow, Olympiacos and Nacional. Born in France, he played for the Portugal under-21s before switching to play senior international football for Morocco.

== Club career ==
=== Nancy ===
Manuel da Costa began his career at Ligue 1 club AS Nancy. As well as his ten appearances in Ligue 1 in the 2005–06 season with his debut coming in January – da Costa scored a memorable individual goal to help Nancy defeat Le Mans in the French League Cup semi-finals. Nancy went on to lift the trophy and qualify for the UEFA Cup.

=== PSV ===
After rejecting offers from Bordeaux and Newcastle United, Da Costa opted to play in the Netherlands with PSV, where the glamour of Champions League football caught his eye. The 20-year-old centre-back agreed a five-year contract with the Dutch champions to become new coach Ronald Koeman's second summer signing at €1 million. Da Costa was given the number 14 shirt, and he stated: "It will be a beautiful base to grow and develop with PSV."

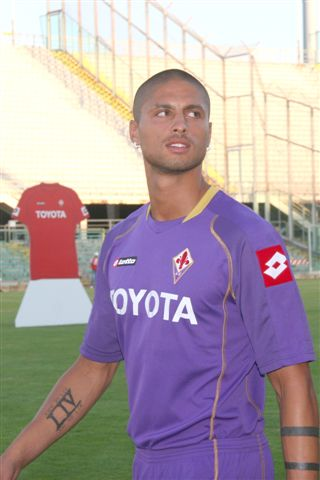
Da Costa at Fiorentina

Da Costa, after a first season to get acquainted to a new challenge, gradually became more important in Koeman's side in 2007–08, establishing himself as a versatile defender. He played his first Champions League match on 12 September 2006, in a 0–0 home draw against Liverpool.

=== Fiorentina ===
On 29 January 2008, it was confirmed by PSV that an agreement had been reached on the transfer of da Costa to ACF Fiorentina, subject to a medical.

Da Costa did not manage to make a breakthrough into Fiorentina's first team, making just one appearance in the Italian Serie A. On 30 January 2009, he agreed for a loan move to Sampdoria till the end of the season.

=== West Ham United ===
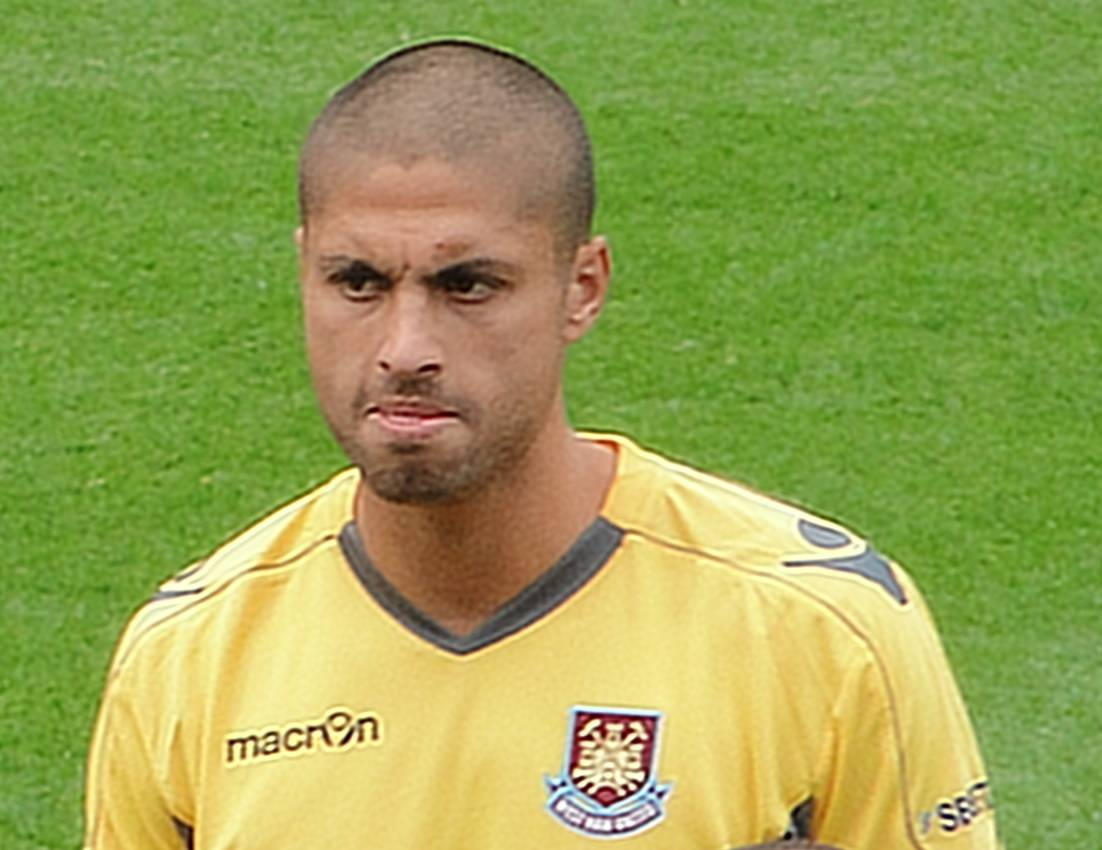
Da Costa at West Ham

In August 2009 Da Costa signed a three-year contract with English side West Ham United, for an undisclosed fee, as part of a deal that took Savio Nsereko to Fiorentina. He made his debut for West Ham in their 3–1 away defeat in the League Cup to Bolton Wanderers on 22 September 2009. His league debut arrived on 28 September 2009 in a 3–1 defeat at Manchester City. He scored his first goal for West Ham against Hull City in a 3–3 draw at the KC Stadium on 21 November 2009. Da Costa left West Ham in June 2011. He had played 35 games in all competitions scoring four goals including two against Stoke City and one against Everton.

=== Lokomotiv Moscow ===
In June 2011 Da Costa left West Ham to join Lokomotiv Moscow for an undisclosed fee after West Ham were relegated from the Premier League. The transfer fee was reported as €1.5 million. According to club president Olga Smorodskaya, he was bought to replace the team left back Marko Baša who left for French Champions Lille OSC.

On 14 August 2011, Da Costa made his debut in Russia against Volga Nizhny Novgorod in a 0–0 draw and also on his debut, he received a yellow card. On 28 August 2011, he provided assist for Felipe Caicedo to score the only goal in the game to beat FC Kuban Krasnodar 1–0. On 10 September 2011, he scored a brace and his first goal in Russia to beat defending champion FC Zenit Saint Petersburg 4–2. By the end of 2011–12 season, Da Costa made 15 appearances after he had established himself in the first team in the second half of the season. He also played in seven of eight games in the UEFA Europa League. However ahead of the new season, Da Costa was used less frequently by new manager Slaven Bilić and his first team opportunities at Lokomotiv Moscow became limited.

=== Nacional ===
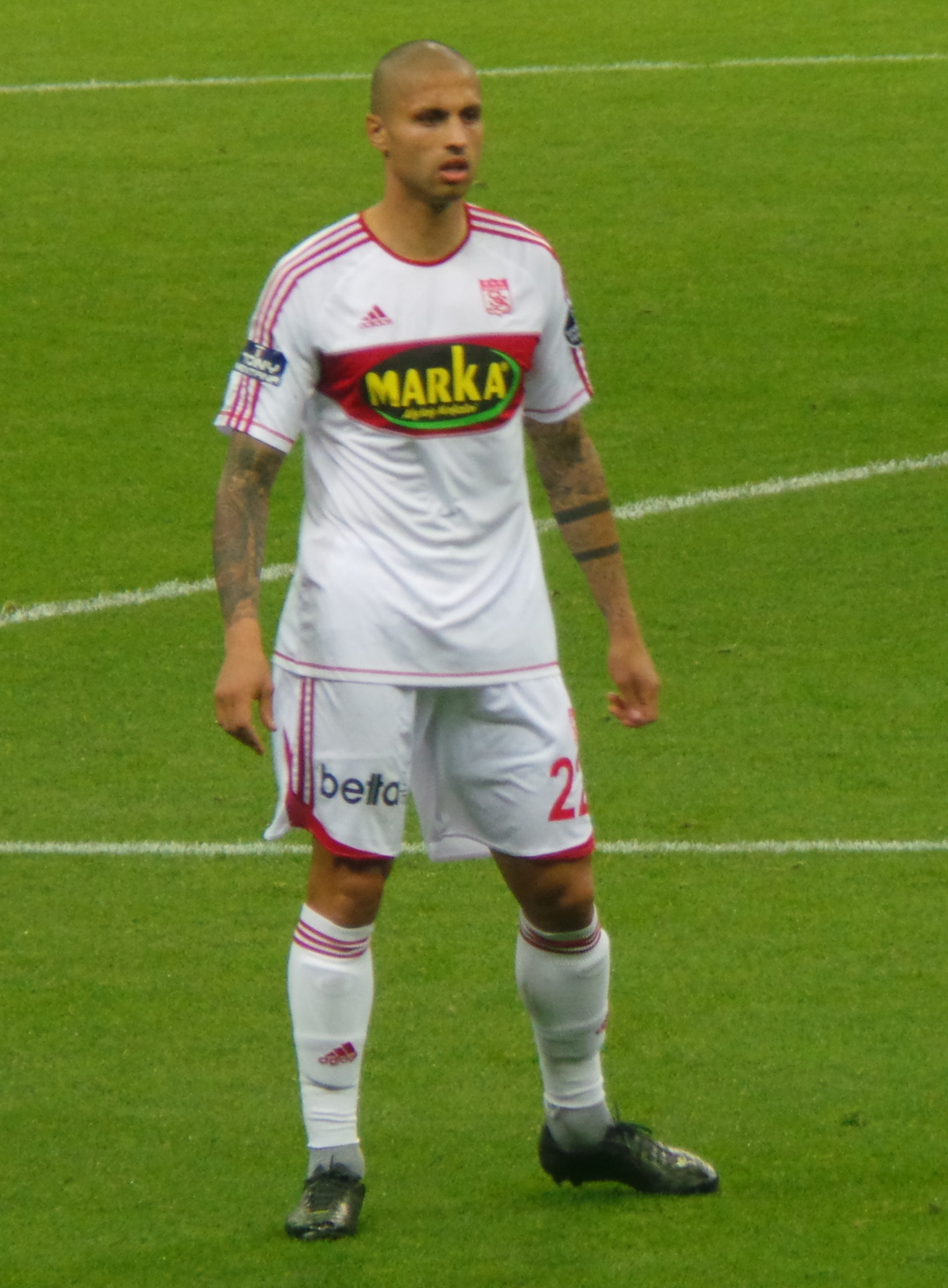
Da Costa at Sivasspor

On 31 August 2012, Da Costa was loaned to Nacional by Lokomotiv Moscow to receive more playing time in the first team. Despite being Portuguese, it was the first time that he had signed for a Portuguese team. He had to wait until 23 September 2012 for his debut, in which he scored in a 3–3 draw against Paços de Ferreira. On 28 October 2012, Da Costa received a red card after a second bookable offence in a 2–1 loss against Rio Ave. After the match, he said that he took responsibility for fouling a player to concede penalty. He also said that he had settled well at the club. On 3 March 2013, Da Costa scored his second goal for the club, in a 2–1 win against Gil Vicente. The next match against Rio Ave, he was again sent-off after a second bookable offence in a 1–1 draw. This turned out to be his last appearance, as in the remainder of the season, he was no longer included in the starting line-up, due to being barred by the club from entering the club's facilities.

At the end of the 2012–13 season, Da Costa's loan spell with Nacional ended and he returned to Lokomotiv Moscow.

=== Sivasspor ===
In July 2013, Da Costa signed for Turkish side Sivasspor on a three-year contract.

=== Olympiacos ===
In August 2015, Olympiacos confirmed the signing of da Costa. He signed a two-year contract for a reported fee of €1.9 million, where he would team up with his fellow Portuguese Marco Silva, who took over as Olympiacos coach in the summer.

=== Başakşehir ===
On 20 July 2017, Da Costa signed a two-year contract with Turkish club Başakşehir.

=== Al-Ittihad ===
On 5 January 2019, Da Costa joined Saudi Arabian club Al Ittihad for a transfer fee of €4.5 million.

=== Waasland-Beveren ===
On 18 January 2022, Da Costa signed a 1.5-year contract with Waasland-Beveren in Belgium.

== International career ==
Da Costa had never played for Portugal but he was called up for Euro 2008 qualifying matches in October, November 2006 and March 2007. He could have played for France or Morocco but instead joined the Portuguese U-21 team. Although he does not speak fluent Portuguese, da Costa insisted that he felt Portuguese, and that the country's place in his heart was his reason for choosing Portugal over France.

He also represented Portugal at the Toulon under-20 tournament in May 2006, having resisted calls to play for France, where he was born. In October 2010 da Costa was called up, for the first time, into the Portugal under-23 team for a game against Northern Ireland under-23 team on 12 October.

In May 2014 Da Costa was named by coach Badou Zaki in the Morocco squad for the 2015 Africa Cup of Nations, to be hosted by Morocco. On 23 May, he made his debut for the Lions of the Atlas in a 4–0 win against Mozambique.

In May 2018 he was named in Morocco's 23-man squad for the 2018 FIFA World Cup in Russia.

== Personal life ==
Da Costa was born and raised in France to a Portuguese father and a Moroccan mother. He speaks French, Portuguese, Moroccan Arabic and English. He has various tattoos, which he had tattooed on him throughout Europe, in Italy, France, England and Russia respectively.

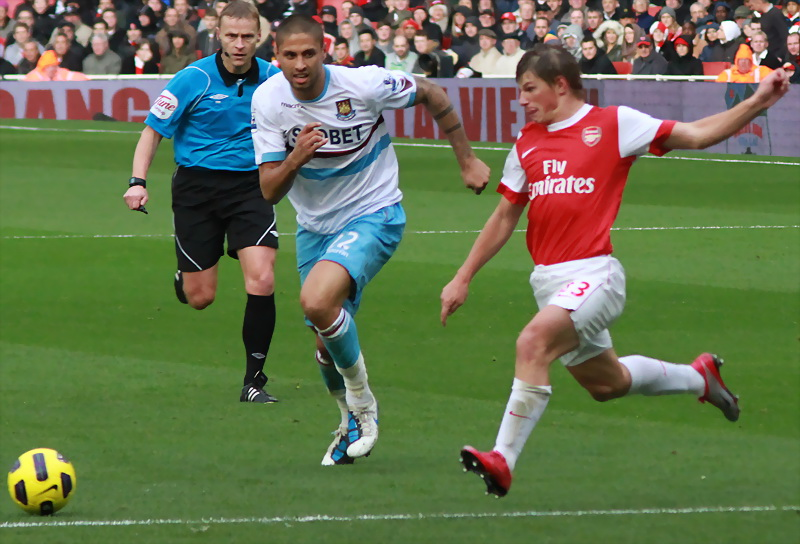
Da Costa clashes with Arsenal's Andrei Arshavin.

=== Legal issues ===
In January 2011, da Costa was charged with sexual assault and common assault on a woman in a nightclub in Ilford. He appeared at Redbridge Magistrates' Court on 25 January. He did not enter a plea and was remanded on bail to appear at Snaresbrook Crown Court on 18 April 2011.

On 18 April, he pleaded not guilty to sexual assault on a woman in Ilford in October 2010 but admitted one charge of common assault. He was released on conditional bail to stand trial at Snaresbrook Crown Court on 12 September 2011. On 16 September, he was cleared of groping a woman in a nightclub, but was fined £1,000 at Snaresbrook Crown Court for slapping her in the face. The judge ordered him to pay £250 compensation to the victim.

During his Nacional career in 2013, da Costa was arrested for driving under the influence (DUI) after the police performed a breathalyzer test on him, which was more than 1.30 g, leading to his arrest in the early morning. In court, da Costa was fined €350 and banned from driving for three months, due to driving under the influence of alcohol.

== Career statistics ==
As of match played 12 July 2019

Appearances and goals by national team and year
| National team | Year | Apps | Goals |
|---|---|---|---|
| Morocco | 2014 | 8 | 0 |
| Morocco | 2015 | 1 | 0 |
| Morocco | 2016 | 8 | 0 |
| Morocco | 2017 | 5 | 0 |
| Morocco | 2018 | 11 | 1 |
| Morocco | 2019 | 4 | 0 |
| Total | | 37 | 1 |

Scores and results list Morocco's goal tally first.

| No | Date | Venue | Opponent | Score | Result | Competition |
|---|---|---|---|---|---|---|
| 1. | 27 March 2018 | Stade Mohamed V, Casablanca, Morocco | Uzbekistan | 2–0 | 2–0 | Friendly |

== Honours ==
AS Nansy

- Coupe de la Ligue: 2005–06

PSV Eindhoven

- Eredivisie: 2006–07

Olympiacos

- Super League Greece: 2015–16, 2016–17

Trabzonspor

- Turkish Cup: 2019–20

=== Individual ===
- UEFA European Under-21 Championship Team of the Tournament: 2007
- France Football Africa Team of the Year: 2018
