= Abdulrahman Al-Ghamdi (footballer, born 1994) =

Saudi Arabian footballer

Personal information
- Full name: Abdulrahman Kamel Abdullah Al-Ghamdi
- Date of birth: November 1, 1994 (age 32)
- Place of birth: Jeddah, Saudi Arabia
- Height: 1.75 m (5 ft 9 in)
- Position: Forward

Team information
- Current team: Wej
- Number: 49

Senior career*
Years	Team	Apps	(Gls)
2013–2021	Al-Ittihad	94	(19)
2021–2022	Al-Raed	4	(0)
2023–2024	Neom	18	(1)
2024–2025	Al-Houra		
2025–	Wej		

International career^{‡}
2015–2017	Saudi Arabia U23		
2016–	Saudi Arabia	0	(0)
- * Club domestic league appearances and goals as of 07:54, 18 January 2016 (UTC) ‡ National team caps and goals as of 13:09, 17 April 2016 (UTC)

Abdulrahman Kamel Abdullah Al-Ghamdi (Arabic: عبدالرحمن كامل عبدالله الغامدي, born 1 November 1994) is a Saudi football player who plays for Wej as a forward.

== Career ==
On 18 September 2023, Al-Ghamdi joined Saudi Second Division side Neom.

On 11 August 2025, Al-Ghamdi joined Wej.

== International career ==
Al-Ghamdi was called up to the senior Saudi Arabia squad for a 2018 FIFA World Cup qualifier against United Arab Emirates in March 2016.

== Honours ==
Al-Ittihad

- King Cup: 2013, 2018
- Crown Prince Cup: 2016–17

Neom

- Saudi Second Division League: 2023–24
