= Assaf Al-Qarni =

Saudi Arabian footballer

Personal information
- Date of birth: 2 April 1984 (age 42)
- Place of birth: Saudi Arabia
- Height: 1.81 m (5 ft 11 in)
- Position: Goalkeeper

Senior career*
Years	Team	Apps	(Gls)
2000–2015	Al-Wehda		
2015–2020	Al-Ittihad	46	(0)

International career^{‡}
2007–2017	Saudi Arabia	11	(0)
- * Club domestic league appearances and goals as of 22 December 2017 ‡ National team caps and goals as of 20:31, 22 December 2017 (UTC)

Assaf Al-Qarni (born April 2, 1984) is a Saudi Arabian football goalkeeper who represented Saudi Arabia in the 2007 Asian Cup.

He was named in Saudi Arabia's preliminary squad for the 2018 World Cup in Russia.

== Honours ==
Al-Ittihad

- Saudi Crown Prince Cup: 2016–17
- King Cup: 2018
