= Jamal Bajandouh =

Saudi Arabian footballer

Personal information
- Date of birth: 22 August 1992 (age 34)
- Place of birth: Bournemouth, England
- Position: Defensive midfielder

Youth career
- 2011–2012: Wimborne Town
- 2012–2013: AFC Bournemouth

Senior career*
Years	Team	Apps	(Gls)
2013–2019	Al-Ittihad	105	(3)
2019–2020	Varaždin	9	(0)
2020–2022	Al-Shabab	16	(0)
2022	→ Al-Tai (loan)	13	(1)
2022–2024	Al-Tai	20	(0)

International career
2015	Saudi Arabia	1	(0)
- * Club domestic league appearances and goals as of 08:04, 29 April 2023 (UTC)

Jamal Bajandouh (Arabic: جمال با جندوح; born 22 August 1992) is a Saudi Arabian professional footballer who plays as a defensive midfielder. Born in England, he plays for the Saudi Arabia national team.

== Career ==
Bajandouh was born in Bournemouth but joined Saudi Arabian side Al-Ittihad as a 13-year-old. He signed for English non-league side Wimborne Town in February 2012. Three months later, he signed for AFC Bournemouth after a spell training with their youth side.

In the summer of 2013, Bajandouh returned to Saudi Arabia to rejoin Al-Ittihad. In the summer of 2019, Bajandouh announced, via the player's official twitter account, his departure from Al-Ittihad. On 13 July 2019, Bajandouh joined Croatian side NK Varaždin on a two-year deal.

On 22 September 2020, Bajandouh joined Al-Shabab on a free transfer. On 8 January 2022, Bajandouh joined Al-Tai on a six-month loan. On 27 July 2022, Bajandouh joined Al-Tai on a two-year deal.

== International career ==
On 30 March 2015, Bajandouh made his senior debut for Saudi Arabia, playing the first half in a 2-1 victory over Jordan. Since it was a friendly fixture, he remains available to play for England.
