= Khaled Al-Samiri =

Saudi Arabian footballer (born 1997)

Personal information
- Full name: Khaled Mohammed Al-Samiri
- Date of birth: 1 January 1997 (age 29)
- Place of birth: Jeddah, Saudi Arabia
- Height: 1.67 m (5 ft 6 in)
- Position: Midfielder

Team information
- Current team: Damac
- Number: 88

Youth career
- 2008-2016: Al-Ittihad

Senior career*
Years	Team	Apps	(Gls)
2016–2023	Al-Ittihad	74	(0)
2021	→ Al-Faisaly (loan)	11	(0)
2022–2023	→ Al-Khaleej (loan)	23	(1)
2023–2025	Al-Khaleej	44	(0)
2025–	Damac	0	(0)

International career^{‡}
2017	Saudi Arabia Under-20	4	(0)
2017–2019	Saudi Arabia Under-23		
2019	Saudi Arabia	2	(0)
- * Club domestic league appearances and goals as of 31 May 2023 ‡ National team caps and goals as of 20 January 2023 (UTC)

Khaled Mohammed Al-Samiri (Arabic: خالد محمد السميري; born 1 January 1997) is a Saudi Arabian footballer who plays as a midfielder for Damac.

== Club career ==
On 27 January 2020, Al-Samiri joined Al-Faisaly on loan from Al-Ittihad on a six-month deal.

On 27 August 2022, Al-Samiri joined Al-Khaleej on loan.

On 9 July 2023, Al-Samiri joined Al-Khaleej on a permanent deal.

On 26 August 2025, Al-Samiri joined Damac.

== International career ==
Al-Samiri played his first international game with the Saudi Arabia Under-20 on 28 December 2017 against Senegal (0–2), in the 2017 FIFA U-20 World Cup. He has also made two appearances for the senior national team.

== Honours ==
Al-Ittihad

- Saudi Crown Prince Cup: 2016–17
- King Cup: 2018

Al-Faisaly

- King Cup: 2020–21
