= 2023–24 Al-Shabab FC season =

Al-Shabab
2023–24 season
- President: Khaled Al-Thunayan (until 27 August); Mohammad Al-Munajem (from 20 September)
- Manager: Marcel Keizer (until 6 September); Juan Brown (Caretaker manager from 6 September to 17 October); Igor Bišćan (from 17 October until 27 December); Vítor Pereira (from 5 February)
- Stadium: Prince Faisal bin Fahd Stadium; Al-Shabab Club Stadium
- Pro League: 8th
- King Cup: Quarter-finals (knocked out by Al-Nassr)
- Arab Club Champions Cup: Semi-finals (knocked out by Al-Hilal)
- Top goalscorer: League: Yannick Carrasco (7); All: Yannick Carrasco (11)
- Highest home attendance: 13,475 (vs. Al-Ahli, 11 May 2024)
- Lowest home attendance: 871 (vs. Al-Batin, 24 September 2023)
- Average home league attendance: 6,564

The 2023–24 season was Al-Shabab's 47th non-consecutive season in the top flight of Saudi football and 77th year in existence as a football club. The club participated in the Pro League, the King Cup, and the Arab Club Champions Cup.

The season covers the period from 1 July 2023 to 30 June 2024.

== Players ==
=== Squad information ===
As of 1 February 2024

Note: Flags indicate national team as defined under FIFA eligibility rules; some limited exceptions apply. Players may hold more than one non-FIFA nationality.

No.	Pos.	Nation	Player
1	GK	KSA	Mustafa Malayekah (on loan from Al-Fateh)
2	DF	KSA	Hamad Al-Yami (on loan from Al-Hilal)
3	DF	KSA	Khaled Asiri
4	DF	BRA	Iago Santos
6	MF	COL	Gustavo Cuéllar
8	MF	KSA	Fahad Al-Muwallad
11	MF	KSA	Hattan Bahebri
12	MF	KSA	Majed Kanabah
13	FW	BRA	Carlos
14	DF	MAR	Romain Saïss (on loan from Al-Sadd)
15	MF	KSA	Hussain Al-Qahtani
16	DF	KSA	Hussain Al-Sibyani
19	MF	KSA	Mohammed Eisa
20	FW	SEN	Habib Diallo
21	MF	KSA	Nawaf Al-Sadi
22	GK	KSA	Fawaz Al-Qarni

No.	Pos.	Nation	Player
23	MF	BEL	Yannick Carrasco
24	DF	KSA	Moteb Al-Harbi
26	MF	KSA	Riyadh Sharahili
28	MF	KSA	Nasser Al-Bishi
29	MF	KSA	Abdullah Al-Jouei
30	MF	CRO	Ivan Rakitić
31	FW	BRA	Vitinho (on loan from Al-Ettifaq)
36	DF	KSA	Nawaf Al-Ghulaimish
37	MF	KSA	Abdullah Matuq
38	DF	KSA	Mohammed Harboush
45	GK	KSA	Mousa Camara
49	FW	KSA	Abdullah Radif (on loan from Al-Hilal)
50	GK	KSA	Mohammed Al-Absi
55	MF	KSA	Musab Al-Juwayr (on loan from Al-Hilal)
60	GK	KSA	Hamed Al-Shanqiti
88	DF	KSA	Nader Al-Sharari

=== Out on loan ===
Note: Flags indicate national team as defined under FIFA eligibility rules; some limited exceptions apply. Players may hold more than one non-FIFA nationality.

No.	Pos.	Nation	Player
25	DF	KSA	Saeed Al-Rubaie (at Al-Okhdood until 30 June 2024)
32	FW	KSA	Saad Al-Muwallad (at Al-Faisaly until 30 June 2024)
34	FW	KSA	Fares Al-Garzae (at Al-Najma until 30 June 2024)
41	FW	KSA	Dhaidan Al-Mutairi (at Al-Batin until 30 June 2024)

No.	Pos.	Nation	Player
85	MF	KSA	Hamad Al-Ghamdi (at Al-Entesar until 30 June 2024)
—	DF	KSA	Sultan Al-Enezi (at Al-Zulfi until 30 June 2024)
—	DF	KSA	Abdullah Al-Rubaie (at Al-Jabalain until 30 June 2024)
—	MF	ARG	Cristian Guanca (at Al-Taawoun until 30 June 2024)

== Transfers and loans ==
=== Transfers in ===
Entry date	Position	No.	Player	From club	Fee	Ref.
30 June 2023	DF	2	(Saudi Arabia) Abdullah Al-Rubaie	(Saudi Arabia) Najran	End of loan	
30 June 2023	MF	17	(Saudi Arabia) Abdulelah Al-Shammeri	(Saudi Arabia) Damac	End of loan	
30 June 2023	MF	29	(Saudi Arabia) Abdullah Al-Jouei	(Saudi Arabia) Al-Tai	End of loan	
30 June 2023	MF	52	(Saudi Arabia) Abdullah Haqawi	(Saudi Arabia) Jeddah	End of loan	
30 June 2023	MF	85	(Saudi Arabia) Hamad Al-Ghamdi	(Saudi Arabia) Al-Taraji	End of loan	
30 June 2023	MF	86	(Saudi Arabia) Marzouq Al-Dossari	(Saudi Arabia) Al-Shaeib	End of loan	
30 June 2023	MF	–	(Brazil) Paulinho	(Saudi Arabia) Al-Fayha	End of loan	
4 July 2023	MF	6	(Colombia) Gustavo Cuéllar	(Saudi Arabia) Al-Hilal	$1,500,000	
14 August 2023	FW	20	(Senegal) Habib Diallo	(France) Strasbourg	$19,600,000	
21 August 2023	MF	21	(Saudi Arabia) Nawaf Al-Sadi	(Saudi Arabia) Abha	Undisclosed	
3 September 2023	MF	23	(Belgium) Yannick Carrasco	(Spain) Atlético Madrid	$16,200,000	
31 January 2024	MF	30	(Croatia) Ivan Rakitić	(Spain) Sevilla	Free	

=== Loans in ===
Start date	End date	Position	No.	Player	From club	Fee	Ref.
5 September 2023	End of season	DF	14	(Morocco) Romain Saïss	(Qatar) Al-Sadd	None	
6 September 2023	End of season	DF	2	(Saudi Arabia) Hamad Al-Yami	(Saudi Arabia) Al-Hilal	None	
6 September 2023	End of season	FW	49	(Saudi Arabia) Abdullah Radif	(Saudi Arabia) Al-Hilal	None	
12 January 2024	End of season	MF	55	(Saudi Arabia) Musab Al-Juwayr	(Saudi Arabia) Al-Hilal	None	
30 January 2024	End of season	GK	1	(Saudi Arabia) Mustafa Malayekah	(Saudi Arabia) Al-Fateh	None	
30 January 2024	End of season	FW	31	(Brazil) Vitinho	(Saudi Arabia) Al-Ettifaq	None	

=== Transfers out ===
Exit date	Position	No.	Player	To club	Fee	Ref.
30 June 2023	MF	23	(Poland) Grzegorz Krychowiak	(Russia) Krasnodar	End of loan	
30 June 2023	FW	77	(Spain) Santi Mina	(Spain) Celta de Vigo	End of loan	
1 July 2023	GK	35	(Saudi Arabia) Hussain Shae'an	(Saudi Arabia) Al-Okhdood	Free	
1 July 2023	DF	12	(Saudi Arabia) Khalid Al-Ghamdi		Retired	
1 July 2023	FW	9	(Gabon) Aaron Boupendza	(United States) FC Cincinnati	$7,000,000	
26 July 2023	MF	–	(Brazil) Paulinho	(Brazil) Vasco da Gama	$1,330,000	
4 August 2023	MF	86	(Saudi Arabia) Marzouq Al-Dossari	(Saudi Arabia) Al-Shaeib	Free	
7 August 2023	GK	1	(Saudi Arabia) Zaid Al-Bawardi	(Saudi Arabia) Al-Riyadh	Free	
7 August 2023	DF	–	(Saudi Arabia) Yazeed Al-Shuwairikh	(Saudi Arabia) Al-Shaeib	Free	
21 August 2023	DF	5	(Saudi Arabia) Hassan Al-Tambakti	(Saudi Arabia) Al-Hilal	$12,260,000	
21 August 2023	FW	71	(Eritrea) Ahmed Abdu Jaber	(Saudi Arabia) Abha	Free	
29 August 2023	MF	7	(Saudi Arabia) Turki Al-Ammar	(Saudi Arabia) Al-Qadsiah	Undisclosed	
7 September 2023	MF	17	(Saudi Arabia) Abdulelah Al-Shammeri	(Saudi Arabia) Abha	Undisclosed	
9 September 2023	FW	87	(Saudi Arabia) Fares Al-Owais	(Saudi Arabia) Al-Kholood	Free	
20 September 2023	MF	52	(Saudi Arabia) Abdullah Haqawi	(Saudi Arabia) Al-Washm	Free	
22 January 2024	MF	10	(Argentina) Éver Banega	(Argentina) Newell's Old Boys	Free	
31 January 2024	DF	27	(Saudi Arabia) Fawaz Al-Sqoor	(Saudi Arabia) Al-Ittihad	$3,000,000	
TBA	MF	30	(Croatia) Ivan Rakitić	(Croatia) Hajduk Split	Free	

=== Loans out ===
Start date	End date	Position	No.	Player	To club	Fee	Ref.
15 July 2023	30 January 2024	MF	8	(Argentina) Cristian Guanca	(United Arab Emirates) Al-Wahda	None	
30 July 2023	End of season	FW	41	(Saudi Arabia) Dhaidan Al-Mutairi	(Saudi Arabia) Al-Batin	None	
15 August 2023	End of season	DF	2	(Saudi Arabia) Abdullah Al-Rubaie	(Saudi Arabia) Al-Jabalain	None	
19 August 2023	End of season	DF	25	(Saudi Arabia) Saeed Al-Rubaie	(Saudi Arabia) Al-Okhdood	None	
7 September 2023	End of season	FW	32	(Saudi Arabia) Saad Al-Muwallad	(Saudi Arabia) Al-Faisaly	None	
9 September 2023	End of season	DF	–	(Saudi Arabia) Sultan Al-Enezi	(Saudi Arabia) Al-Zulfi	None	
10 September 2023	End of season	FW	34	(Saudi Arabia) Fares Al-Garzae	(Saudi Arabia) Al-Najma	None	
1 October 2023	End of season	MF	85	(Saudi Arabia) Hamad Al-Ghamdi	(Saudi Arabia) Al-Entesar	None	
30 January 2024	End of season	MF	–	(Argentina) Cristian Guanca	(Saudi Arabia) Al-Taawoun	None	

== Pre-season ==
9 July 2023 Friendly	Al-Shabab (Saudi Arabia)	1–1	(Czech Republic) Jablonec	Lienz, Austria
18:00 CEST	Al-Rubaie 90'	Report	Tekijaški 73'	Stadium: Dolomitenstadion Lienz

14 July 2023 Friendly	Al-Shabab (Saudi Arabia)	3–1	(Qatar) Al-Sadd	Wörgl, Austria
18:00 CEST	Bahebri; Abdu; Al-Ammar	Report	Bounedjah	Stadium: Centro Sportivo di Wörgl

19 July 2023 Friendly	Al-Shabab (Saudi Arabia)	1–0	(Hungary) Debreceni VSC	Irdning, Austria
CEST	Banega 59'	Report		Stadium: ATV-Riesneralm-Arena Irdning

== Competitions ==
=== Overview ===
Competition	Record							
Competition	G	W	D	L	GF	GA	GD	Win %
Pro League	34	12	8	14	45	42	+3	35.29
King Cup	3	2	0	1	6	7	−1	66.67
Arab Club Champions Cup	5	2	2	1	3	3	+0	40.00
Total	42	16	10	16	54	52	+2	38.10

Updated to match played complete
Source: Competitions

=== Pro League ===
==== League table ====
Pos	Team	Pld	W	D	L	GF	GA	GD	Pts	Qualification or relegation
6	Al-Ettifaq	34	12	12	10	43	34	+9	48	Qualification for the AGCFF Gulf Club Champions League group stage
7	Al-Fateh	34	12	9	13	57	55	+2	45	
8	Al-Shabab	34	12	8	14	45	42	+3	44 (Note: Al-Shabab finished ahead of Al-Fayha on overall goal difference: Al-Shabab +3, Al-Fayha −8 (Al-Fayha 0–1 Al-Shabab, Al-Shabab 2–3 Al-Fayha).)	
9	Al-Fayha	34	11	11	12	44	52	−8	44	
10	Damac	34	10	11	13	44	45	−1	41	

Source: SPL
Rules for classification: 1) Points; 2) Head-to-head points; 3) Head-to-head goal difference; 4) Total goal difference; 5) Total goals scored; 6) Fair-play points
(Note: Head-to-head record is used only after all the matches between the teams in question have been played).

==== Results summary ====
Overall								Home						Away					
Pld	W	D	L	GF	GA	GD	Pts	W	D	L	GF	GA	GD	W	D	L	GF	GA	GD
34	12	8	14	45	42	+3	44	8	3	6	31	22	+9	4	5	8	14	20	−6

Last updated: complete.
Source: spl.com.sa

==== Results by round ====
Round	1	2	3	4	5	6	7	8	9	10	11	12	13	14	15	16	17	18	19	20	21	22	23	24	25	26	27	28	29	30	31	32	33	34
Ground	H	A	H	A	H	A	H	A	A	H	A	H	A	A	H	H	A	A	H	A	H	A	H	A	H	H	A	H	A	H	H	A	A	H
Result	D	L	D	L	L	W	W	L	D	W	L	W	L	D	L	D	D	L	W	W	L	D	L	W	L	W	D	W	W	W	L	L	L	W
Position	8	13	14	17	17	13	11	11	12	10	11	10	11	11	12	11	12	13	11	10	11	11	12	10	11	11	11	9	9	6	9	9	9	8

Source: spl.com.sa
A = Away; H = Home; W = Win; D = Draw; L = Loss

==== Matches ====
All times are local, AST (UTC+3).

Win Draw Loss Postponed

14 August 2023 1	Al-Shabab	1–1	Al-Okhdood	Riyadh
21:00	Santos (yellow card) 63'; Abdu 66'; Al-Sibyani (yellow card) 90+6'	Report	Burcă 41'; Khamis (yellow card) 68'; Pedroza (yellow card) 88'	Stadium: Prince Faisal bin Fahd Stadium; Attendance: 1,974; Referee: Majed Al-Shamrani

18 August 2023 2	Al-Wehda	3–1	Al-Shabab	Mecca
21:00	Al Hejji (yellow card) 4'; Anselmo 45'; Al-Eisa 45+3'; Noor (yellow card) 63'; Al-Naji 90+7'	Report	Al-Qahtani (yellow card) 29'; El Yamiq 90+5' (o.g.)	Stadium: King Abdul Aziz Stadium; Attendance: 3,000; Referee: Shukri Al-Hanfoush

25 August 2023 3	Al-Shabab	1–1	Damac	Riyadh
21:00	Bahebri (yellow card) 27'; Diallo (yellow card) 45'; Al-Sharari (yellow card) 45+7'; Santos (yellow card) 69'; F. Al-Muwallad 89'	Report	Maher (yellow card) 40'; Al-Bishi (yellow card) 45+5'; Nkoudou 71'; Al-Shamrani (yellow card) 83'; Zeghba (yellow card) 90+1'	Stadium: Prince Faisal bin Fahd Stadium; Attendance: 1,588; Referee: Mohammed Al-Harbi

29 August 2023 4	Al-Nassr	4–0	Al-Shabab	Riyadh
21:00	Ronaldo 13' (pen.), 38' (pen.); Mané 40', (yellow card) 43'; S. Al-Ghannam 80'; Boushal (yellow card) 89'	Report	Al-Sibyani (yellow card) 29'; Al-Sharari (yellow card) 33'; Cuéllar (yellow card) 37'; Santos (yellow card) 43'; Bahebri (yellow card) 77'; Banega (red card) 78'	Stadium: Al-Awwal Park; Attendance: 21,383; Referee: Ismail Elfath (United States)

2 September 2023 5	Al-Shabab	1–3	Al-Khaleej	Riyadh
21:00	Diallo 20'; Cuéllar (yellow card) 54'; Santos (yellow card) 61'; F. Al-Muwallad (yellow card) 67'; Harboush (yellow card) 90+4'	Report	Hamzi 39'; Hawsawi (red card) 56'; Al-Khabrani (yellow card) 59'; Martins 68'; Narey (yellow card) 80'; Sherif 81'	Stadium: Prince Faisal bin Fahd Stadium; Attendance: 987; Referee: Mohammed Al-Hoaish

15 September 2023 6	Al-Fayha	0–1	Al-Shabab	Al Majma'ah
18:00	Cimirot (yellow card) 34'; Al-Baqawi (yellow card) 45+2'; Mandash (yellow card) 61'	Report	Diallo (yellow card) 45+2'; Saïss 52'; Al-Sharari (red card) 74'; Banega (yellow card) 90+2'	Stadium: Al Majma'ah Sports City; Attendance: 1,104; Referee: Ahmed Al-Rumaikhani

21 September 2023 7	Al-Shabab	4–1	Al-Hazem	Riyadh
21:00	Carrasco 45'; Al-Sqoor 45+2'; Banega 49' (pen.), 90+7'; Saïss (yellow card) 69'; Carlos (yellow card) 75'; Cuéllar (yellow card) 87'	Report	Abousaban (yellow card) 43'; Tozé 66'	Stadium: Prince Faisal bin Fahd Stadium; Attendance: 2,450; Referee: Majed Al-Shamrani

29 September 2023 8	Al-Hilal	2–0	Al-Shabab	Riyadh
21:00	Al-Bulaihi (yellow card) 45+7'; Koulibaly 68'; Mitrović 76'	Report	Al-Muwallad (yellow card) 87'	Stadium: Prince Faisal bin Fahd Stadium; Attendance: 14,769; Referee: Iván Barton (El Salvador)

5 October 2023 9	Al-Riyadh	2–2	Al-Shabab	Riyadh
18:00	Gray 36', (yellow card) 54'; Al-Shwirekh (yellow card) 58'; Juanmi 73'	Report	Al-Sibyani (yellow card) 45'; Saïss 53'; Santos 87'	Stadium: Prince Faisal bin Fahd Stadium; Attendance: 1,684; Referee: Raed Al-Zahrani

21 October 2023 10	Al-Shabab	2–0	Al-Tai	Riyadh
21:00	Diallo 50'; Al-Qahtani (yellow card) 81', (goal) 90+5'	Report	Qassem (yellow card) 8'; Dugandžić (yellow card) 14'; Misidjan (yellow card) 38'	Stadium: Al-Shabab Club Stadium; Attendance: 11,974; Referee: Shukri Al-Hanfoush

28 October 2023 11	Abha	2–1	Al-Shabab	Abha
18:00	Bguir 73'; Krychowiak 82'; Abdulelah S. (yellow card) 90+7'	Report	Santos (yellow card) 68' (yellow-red card) 72'; Al-Muwallad 76'; Saïss (yellow card) 81'	Stadium: Prince Sultan bin Abdul Aziz Stadium; Attendance: 1,378; Referee: Mohammed Al-Hoaish

3 November 2023 12	Al-Shabab	1–0	Al-Ittihad	Riyadh
21:00	Carlos 14'; Cuéllar (yellow card) 45+2'; Banega (yellow card) 61'; Al-Qahtani (yellow card) 73'; Al-Muwallad (yellow card) 83'; Saïss (yellow card) 89'	Report		Stadium: King Fahd International Stadium; Attendance: 11,476; Referee: Nicolás Ramírez (Argentina)

9 November 2023 13	Al-Raed	2–1	Al-Shabab	Buraidah
18:00	El Berkaoui 6'; Tavares 55'; Al-Jayzani (yellow card) 80'	Report	Al-Yami (yellow card) 67'; Bahebri (yellow card) 89'; Saïss 90+3'	Stadium: Al-Taawoun Club Stadium; Attendance: 4,275; Referee: Mamdouh Al Shahdan

25 November 2023 14	Al-Ahli	0–0	Al-Shabab	Jeddah
21:00	Al-Hurayji (yellow card) 29'; Veiga (yellow card) 90+4'; Hindi (yellow card) 90+5'	Report	Saïss (yellow card) 47'; Santos (yellow card) 76'; Al-Sqoor (yellow card) 90+5'	Stadium: Prince Abdullah Al Faisal Stadium; Attendance: 17,456; Referee: Mario Escobar (Guatemala)

2 December 2023 15	Al-Shabab	1–2	Al-Taawoun	Riyadh
21:00	Carrasco 33' (pen.); Cuéllar (yellow card) 56'	Report	Faqeehi (yellow card) 21'; Pedro 55', 62', (yellow card) 90+2'; Bahusayn (yellow card) 82'	Stadium: Al-Shabab Club Stadium; Attendance: 8,134; Referee: Anastasios Sidiropoulos (Greece)

7 December 2023 16	Al-Shabab	0–0	Al-Ettifaq	Riyadh
21:00	Al-Qahtani (yellow card) 7'; Santos (yellow card) 12'; Banega (red card) 66'; Cuéllar (red card) 85'	Report	Gray (red card) 85'	Stadium: Al-Shabab Club Stadium; Attendance: 8,037; Referee: Fernando Rapallini (Argentina)

15 December 2023 17	Al-Fateh	1–1	Al-Shabab	Al-Hasa
18:00	Batna 15'; Al-Hassan (yellow card) 64'; Al-Fuhaid (yellow card) 66'; Zelarayán (yellow card) 79'	Report	Santos (yellow card) 32'; Al-Harbi (yellow card) 45+5'; Radif 58'; Al-Sharari (yellow card) 90+4'	Stadium: Al-Fateh Club Stadium; Attendance: 6,402; Referee: Mamdouh Al Shahdan

22 December 2023 18	Al-Okhdood	1–0	Al-Shabab	Najran
18:00	Godwin 3'; Kvirkvelia (yellow card) 45+1'; Tănase (yellow card) 47'; Burcă (red card) 70'	Report	Al-Sadi (red card) 55'	Stadium: Prince Hathloul bin Abdul Aziz Sports City; Attendance: 1,449; Referee: Andrei Chivulete (Romania)

30 December 2023 19	Al-Shabab	1–0	Al-Wehda	Riyadh
21:00	Al-Harbi (yellow card) 34'; Carrasco (yellow card) 73'; Radif 85'	Report	Al-Qarni (yellow card) 90+3'	Stadium: Al-Shabab Club Stadium; Attendance: 3,451; Referee: Danny Makkelie (Netherlands)

16 February 2024 20	Damac	0–1	Al-Shabab	Khamis Mushait
17:00	Hamed (yellow card) 18'; Hawsawi (yellow card) 51' (yellow-red card) 67'	Report	Bahebri (yellow card) 21'; Saïss (yellow card) 50'; Rakitić 82'	Stadium: Damac Club Stadium; Attendance: 3,845; Referee: Jesús Valenzuela (Venezuela)

25 February 2024 21	Al-Shabab	2–3	Al-Nassr	Riyadh
20:00	Carrasco (yellow card) 26', (goal) 45+8' (pen.); Saïss (yellow card) 51'; Carlos 67'; Al-Sharari (yellow card) 88'; Radif (yellow card) 90+6' (yellow-red card) 90+12'	Report	Ronaldo 21' (pen.); Talisca 46', 86'; Boushal (yellow card) 90+6'	Stadium: Al-Shabab Club Stadium; Attendance: 11,974; Referee: Tamás Bognár (Hungary)

2 March 2024 22	Al-Khaleej	0–0	Al-Shabab	Dammam
17:00	Al-Khabrani (yellow card) 9'; Martins (yellow card) 70'	Report	Carlos (yellow card) 61'; Santos (yellow card) 90'	Stadium: Prince Mohamed bin Fahd Stadium; Attendance: 3,457; Referee: Ahmed Al-Rumaikhani

7 March 2024 23	Al-Shabab	2–3	Al-Fayha	Riyadh
17:00	Vitinho (yellow card) 45+1'; Al-Duqayl 86' (o.g.); Diallo 89'; Al-Muwallad (yellow card) 90+2'	Report	Onyekuru 50' (pen.), 74'; Al-Qaydhi (yellow card) 59'; Al-Safri (yellow card) 88'; Al-Duqayl (yellow card) 90+2'; Zidan 90+8'	Stadium: Al-Shabab Club Stadium; Attendance: 2,012; Referee: Gustavo Correia (Portugal)

14 March 2024 24	Al-Hazem	0–3	Al-Shabab	Ar Rass
22:00	Moreno (yellow card) 33'; Al-Najjar (yellow card) 83'	Report	Santos (yellow card) 11'; Viana 34' (o.g.); Al-Juwayr (yellow card) 36'; Diallo 53'; Cuéllar (yellow card) 75'; Radif 90+6'	Stadium: Al-Hazem Club Stadium; Attendance: 825; Referee: Georgi Kabakov (Bulgaria)

30 March 2024 25	Al-Shabab	3–4	Al-Hilal	Riyadh
22:00	Al-Juwayr 3'; Santos (yellow card) 36'; Al-Sibyani 64'; Saïss 78'	Report	Mitrović 20' (pen.), 27'; Milinković-Savić 42'; S. Al-Dawsari 57'	Stadium: Al-Shabab Club Stadium; Attendance: 12,087; Referee: Mario Escobar (Guatemala)

3 April 2024 26	Al-Shabab	1–0	Al-Riyadh	Riyadh
22:00	Al-Shuwayyi 33' (o.g.); Al-Muwallad (yellow card) 90+1'	Report	Al-Zaqaan (yellow card) 90+2'	Stadium: Al-Shabab Club Stadium; Attendance: 4,317; Referee: Khaled Al-Teris

6 April 2024 27	Al-Tai	0–0	Al-Shabab	Ha'il
22:00	Al-Nakhli (yellow card) 75'; Bauer (yellow card) 90+2'	Report	Cuéllar (yellow card) 40'; Saïss (yellow card) 89'	Stadium: Prince Abdul Aziz bin Musa'ed Stadium; Attendance: 7,879; Referee: Sultan Al-Harbi

18 April 2024 28	Al-Shabab	5–0	Abha	Riyadh
21:00	Carrasco 45+1', 90+3'; Diallo 57'; Carlos 78', 84'	Report	Al-Jumayah (yellow card) 28'; Al-Sahafi (yellow card) 79'	Stadium: Al-Shabab Club Stadium; Attendance: 4,563; Referee: Shukri Al-Hanfoush

26 April 2024 29	Al-Ittihad	1–3	Al-Shabab	Jeddah
21:00	Haji (yellow card) 18'; Hamdallah 58'	Report	Sharahili (yellow card) 41'; Diallo 48'; Kanabah (yellow card) 52'; Carlos 82'; Al-Qahtani (yellow card) 90+7'; Al-Juwayr 90+10'	Stadium: King Abdullah Sports City; Attendance: 18,323; Referee: César Ramos (Mexico)

4 May 2024 30	Al-Shabab	2–0	Al-Raed	Riyadh
18:00	Carrasco (yellow card) 44', (goal) 81'; Carlos 56'; Santos (yellow card) 62'	Report	Al-Fahad (yellow card) 35'; Al-Beshe (yellow card) 66'; Loum (yellow card) 90' (yellow-red card) 90+8'	Stadium: Al-Shabab Club Stadium; Attendance: 6,548; Referee: Raed Al-Zahrani

11 May 2024 31	Al-Shabab	1–2	Al-Ahli	Riyadh
21:00	Carrasco 19'; Saïss (yellow card) 50'	Report	Kessié 45+10', (yellow card) 85'; Ibañez (yellow card) 47'; Firmino 53'; Al-Majhad (yellow card) 90+1'; Al-Rashidi (yellow card) 90+7'	Stadium: Al-Shabab Club Stadium; Attendance: 13,475; Referee: Sergei Karasev (Russia)

18 May 2024 32	Al-Taawoun	1–0	Al-Shabab	Buraidah
19:20	Al-Ahmed (yellow card) 24'; Pedro 52' (pen.)	Report	Rakitić (yellow card) 64'	Stadium: Al-Taawoun Club Stadium; Attendance: 4,607; Referee: Sami Al-Jires

23 May 2024 33	Al-Ettifaq	1–0	Al-Shabab	Dammam
21:00	Medrán 38'; Wijnaldum (yellow card) 90+15'	Report	Saïss (yellow card) 71'; Al-Harbi (yellow card) 90+3'; Santos (yellow card) 90+5'	Stadium: Al-Ettifaq Club Stadium; Attendance: 6,049; Referee: Ahmed Al-Rumaikhani

27 May 2024 34	Al-Shabab	3–2	Al-Fateh	Riyadh
21:00	Al-Sibyani 14', (red card) 59'; Radif (yellow card) 37'; Vitinho 72'; Al-Juwayr 89'	Report	Saâdane 51'; Denayer 90+3'; Al-Shurafa (yellow card) 90+7'	Stadium: Al-Shabab Club Stadium; Attendance: 6,546; Referee: Abdullah Al-Harbi

=== King Cup ===
All times are local, AST (UTC+3).

24 September 2023 Round of 32	Al-Shabab	2–1 (a.e.t.)	Al-Batin	Riyadh
21:00	Banega (yellow card) 23'; Carrasco 33', 118'	Report	Alemán 37'; Nasser (yellow card) 60'	Stadium: Prince Faisal bin Fahd Stadium; Attendance: 871; Referee: Mohammed Abo Shaqqara

31 October 2023 Round of 16	Al-Fateh	1–2 (a.e.t.)	Al-Shabab	Al-Hasa
15:15	Al-Fuhaid (yellow card) 16'; Tello 24'; Al-Mohammed (yellow card) 113'	Report	Bahebri (yellow card) 19'; Cuéllar (yellow card) 47'; Carrasco 59', 115', (yellow card) 118'; Al-Sibyani (yellow card) 110'; Kanabah (yellow card) 120+2'	Stadium: Prince Abdullah bin Jalawi Stadium; Attendance: 6,427; Referee: Sami Al-Jires

11 December 2023 Quarter-finals	Al-Shabab	2–5	Al-Nassr	Riyadh
21:00	Al-Muwallad (yellow card) 20'; Carlos 24'; Saïss (yellow card) 62'; Al-Qahtani (yellow card) 70'; Bahebri 90'	Report	Fofana 17'; Mané 28'; Ghareeb 45+4'; Ronaldo 74'; Maran 90+6'	Stadium: Al-Shabab Club Stadium; Attendance: 10,387; Referee: Iván Barton (El Salvador)

=== Arab Club Champions Cup ===
==== Group stage ====
Pos	Team	Pld	W	D	L	GF	GA	GD	Pts	Qualification
1	(Saudi Arabia) Al-Shabab	3	2	1	0	2	0	+2	7	Advance to knockout stage
2	(Saudi Arabia) Al-Nassr	3	1	2	0	5	2	+3	5	Advance to knockout stage
3	(Egypt) Zamalek	3	1	1	1	5	2	+3	4	
4	(Tunisia) US Monastir	3	0	0	3	1	9	−8	0	

Source: UAFA
Rules for classification: Group stage tiebreakers

28 July 2023 1	Al-Nassr (Saudi Arabia)	0–0	(Saudi Arabia) Al-Shabab	Taif, Saudi Arabia
22:00 UTC+3	Al-Hassan (yellow card) 43'; Talisca (yellow card) 46'	Report	Al-Jouei (yellow card) 2'; Abdu (yellow card) 60'; Santos (yellow card) 88'	Stadium: King Fahd Stadium; Referee: Lotfi Bekouassa (Algeria)

31 July 2023 2	Al-Shabab (Saudi Arabia)	1–0	(Egypt) Zamalek	Taif, Saudi Arabia
18:00 UTC+3	Al-Shammeri (yellow card) 21'; Banega (yellow card) 33', (goal) 44' (pen.); Al-Rubaie (yellow card) 34'; Al-Sibyani (yellow card) 43'; Santos (yellow card) 75'; Kim Seung-gyu (yellow card) 86'; Al-Sharari (yellow card) 89'	Report	Mathlouthi (yellow card) 8'; El Sisi (yellow card) 33'; Zizo (yellow card) 33'; Jaziri (yellow card) 44'; Shikabala (yellow card) 89'	Stadium: King Fahd Stadium; Referee: Abdulwahid Huraywidah (Libya)

3 August 2023 3	Al-Shabab (Saudi Arabia)	1–0	(Tunisia) Union Monastirienne	Al Bahah, Saudi Arabia
18:00 UTC+3	Banega 26' (pen.); Al-Rubaie (yellow card) 46'	Report	Ben Othmane (yellow card) 9'; Aloui (yellow card) 23'; Baccar (yellow card) 41'	Stadium: King Saud Sport City Stadium; Referee: Mohanad Qasim Sarray (Iraq)

==== Knockout phase ====
6 August 2023 Quarter-finals	Al-Shabab (Saudi Arabia)	0–0 (5–4 p)	(United Arab Emirates) Al Wahda	Taif, Saudi Arabia
21:00 UTC+3	Santos (red card) 28'; Al-Jouei (yellow card) 34'; Banega (yellow card) 61'; Cuéllar (yellow card) 66'; Al-Tambakti (yellow card) 73'	Report	Pedro (yellow card) 38'; Kazim (yellow card) 46'; Al Karbi (yellow card) 61' (yellow-red card) 67'; Zouhir (yellow card) 89'	Stadium: King Fahd Stadium; Referee: Lahlou Benbraham (Algeria)
	Penalties
	Banega (penalty scored); Al-Tambakti (penalty scored); Bahebri (penalty scored); Al-Ammar (penalty scored); Kanabah (penalty scored)		(penalty scored) Pedro; (penalty scored) Guanca; (penalty missed) Jumaa; (penalty scored) Nourollahi; (penalty scored) Pimenta

9 August 2023 Semi-finals	Al-Hilal (Saudi Arabia)	3–1	(Saudi Arabia) Al-Shabab	Taif, Saudi Arabia
21:00 UTC+3	Kanno 9'; Neves (yellow card) 22'; Al-Mayouf (red card) 25'; Malcom 45+3'; Koulibaly (yellow card) 90+1'; Al-Hamdan 90+5'	Report	Al-Sibyani (yellow card) 8'; Cuéllar 56'; Al-Qahtani (yellow card) 71'	Stadium: King Fahd Stadium; Referee: Amin Omar (Egypt)

== Statistics ==
=== Appearances ===
Last updated on 27 May 2024.

No.	Pos	Nat	Player	Total		Pro League		King Cup		Arab Club Champions Cup	
No.	Pos	Nat	Player	Apps	Goals	Apps	Goals	Apps	Goals	Apps	Goals
Goalkeepers
1	GK	(Saudi Arabia) KSA	Mustafa Malayekah	9	0	9	0	0	0	0	0
22	GK	(Saudi Arabia) KSA	Fawaz Al-Qarni	0	0	0	0	0	0	0	0
45	GK	(Saudi Arabia) KSA	Mousa Camara	0	0	0	0	0	0	0	0
50	GK	(Saudi Arabia) KSA	Mohammed Al-Absi	6	0	6	0	0	0	0	0
60	GK	(Saudi Arabia) KSA	Hamed Al-Shanqiti	0	0	0	0	0	0	0	0
Defenders
2	DF	(Saudi Arabia) KSA	Hamad Al-Yami	26	0	22+2	0	2	0	0	0
3	DF	(Saudi Arabia) KSA	Khaled Asiri	3	0	0+2	0	0+1	0	0	0
4	DF	(Brazil) BRA	Iago Santos	35	1	30	1	2	0	3	0
14	DF	(Morocco) MAR	Romain Saïss	28	4	25	4	3	0	0	0
16	DF	(Saudi Arabia) KSA	Hussain Al-Sibyani	23	2	11+6	2	0+1	0	5	0
24	DF	(Saudi Arabia) KSA	Moteb Al-Harbi	22	0	16+4	0	0+1	0	0+1	0
36	DF	(Saudi Arabia) KSA	Nawaf Al-Ghulaimish	0	0	0	0	0	0	0	0
38	DF	(Saudi Arabia) KSA	Mohammed Harboush	9	0	3+5	0	1	0	0	0
88	DF	(Saudi Arabia) KSA	Nader Al-Sharari	31	0	24+2	0	1+1	0	0+3	0
Midfielders
6	MF	(Colombia) COL	Gustavo Cuéllar	36	1	29+1	0	2	0	4	1
8	MF	(Saudi Arabia) KSA	Fahad Al-Muwallad	22	2	7+12	2	2+1	0	0	0
11	MF	(Saudi Arabia) KSA	Hattan Bahebri	28	1	14+6	0	1+2	1	5	0
12	MF	(Saudi Arabia) KSA	Majed Kanabah	31	0	4+20	0	2+1	0	2+2	0
15	MF	(Saudi Arabia) KSA	Hussain Al-Qahtani	37	1	19+10	1	2+1	0	2+3	0
19	MF	(Saudi Arabia) KSA	Mohammed Eisa	3	0	0+2	0	0	0	0+1	0
21	MF	(Saudi Arabia) KSA	Nawaf Al-Sadi	16	0	7+8	0	0+1	0	0	0
23	MF	(Belgium) BEL	Yannick Carrasco	27	11	23+1	7	3	4	0	0
26	MF	(Saudi Arabia) KSA	Riyadh Sharahili	15	0	3+6	0	0+2	0	4	0
28	MF	(Saudi Arabia) KSA	Nasser Al-Bishi	0	0	0	0	0	0	0	0
29	MF	(Saudi Arabia) KSA	Abdullah Al-Jouei	8	0	2+2	0	0	0	3+1	0
30	MF	(Croatia) CRO	Ivan Rakitić	8	1	7+1	1	0	0	0	0
55	MF	(Saudi Arabia) KSA	Musab Al-Juwayr	15	3	10+5	3	0	0	0	0
Forwards
13	FW	(Brazil) BRA	Carlos	27	7	14+10	6	2+1	1	0	0
20	FW	(Senegal) SEN	Habib Diallo	33	6	24+6	6	2+1	0	0	0
31	FW	(Brazil) BRA	Vitinho	8	1	5+3	1	0	0	0	0
37	FW	(Saudi Arabia) KSA	Abdullah Matuq	1	0	0+1	0	0	0	0	0
49	FW	(Saudi Arabia) KSA	Abdullah Radif	22	3	5+15	3	1+1	0	0	0
Players sent out on loan this season
25	DF	(Saudi Arabia) KSA	Saeed Al-Rubaie	3	0	0	0	0	0	2+1	0
32	FW	(Saudi Arabia) KSA	Saad Al-Muwallad	2	0	0+1	0	0	0	0+1	0
Player who made an appearance this season but have left the club
5	DF	(Saudi Arabia) KSA	Hassan Al-Tambakti	6	0	1	0	0	0	5	0
7	MF	(Saudi Arabia) KSA	Turki Al-Ammar	8	0	3	0	0	0	0+5	0
10	MF	(Argentina) ARG	Éver Banega	24	4	16	2	1+2	0	5	2
17	MF	(Saudi Arabia) KSA	Abdulelah Al-Shammeri	5	0	1+1	0	0	0	2+1	0
18	GK	(South Korea) KOR	Kim Seung-gyu	27	0	19	0	3	0	5	0
27	DF	(Saudi Arabia) KSA	Fawaz Al-Sqoor	24	1	15+1	1	3	0	5	0
71	FW	(Eritrea) ERI	Ahmed Abdu Jaber	6	1	0+2	1	0	0	3+1	0

=== Goalscorers ===
Rank	No.	Pos	Nat	Name	Pro League	King Cup	Arab Club Champions Cup	Total
1	23	MF	(Belgium)	Yannick Carrasco	7	4	0	11
2	13	FW	(Brazil)	Carlos	6	1	0	7
3	20	FW	(Senegal)	Habib Diallo	6	0	0	6
4	10	MF	(Argentina)	Éver Banega	2	0	2	4
4	14	DF	(Morocco)	Romain Saïss	4	0	0	4
6	49	FW	(Saudi Arabia)	Abdullah Radif	3	0	0	3
6	55	MF	(Saudi Arabia)	Musab Al-Juwayr	3	0	0	3
8	8	MF	(Saudi Arabia)	Fahad Al-Muwallad	2	0	0	2
8	16	DF	(Saudi Arabia)	Hussain Al-Sibyani	2	0	0	2
10	4	DF	(Brazil)	Iago Santos	1	0	0	1
10	6	MF	(Colombia)	Gustavo Cuéllar	0	0	1	1
10	11	MF	(Saudi Arabia)	Hattan Bahebri	0	1	0	1
10	15	MF	(Saudi Arabia)	Hussain Al-Qahtani	1	0	0	1
10	27	DF	(Saudi Arabia)	Fawaz Al-Sqoor	1	0	0	1
10	30	MF	(Croatia)	Ivan Rakitić	1	0	0	1
10	31	FW	(Brazil)	Vitinho	1	0	0	1
10	71	FW	(Eritrea)	Ahmed Abdu Jaber	1	0	0	1
Own goal					4	0	0	4
Total					45	6	3	54

Last Updated: 27 May 2024

=== Assists ===
Rank	No.	Pos	Nat	Name	Pro League	King Cup	Arab Club Champions Cup	Total
1	23	MF	(Belgium)	Yannick Carrasco	7	1	0	8
2	2	DF	(Saudi Arabia)	Hamad Al-Yami	3	0	0	3
2	13	FW	(Brazil)	Carlos	3	0	0	3
2	20	FW	(Senegal)	Habib Diallo	2	1	0	3
5	4	DF	(Brazil)	Iago Santos	2	0	0	2
5	24	DF	(Saudi Arabia)	Moteb Al-Harbi	2	0	0	2
5	55	MF	(Saudi Arabia)	Musab Al-Juwayr	2	0	0	2
8	7	MF	(Saudi Arabia)	Turki Al-Ammar	1	0	0	1
8	10	MF	(Argentina)	Éver Banega	1	0	0	1
8	12	MF	(Saudi Arabia)	Majed Kanabah	0	1	0	1
8	14	DF	(Morocco)	Romain Saïss	1	0	0	1
8	15	MF	(Saudi Arabia)	Hussain Al-Qahtani	1	0	0	1
8	16	DF	(Saudi Arabia)	Hussain Al-Sibyani	1	0	0	1
8	27	DF	(Saudi Arabia)	Fawaz Al-Sqoor	1	0	0	1
8	30	MF	(Croatia)	Ivan Rakitić	1	0	0	1
8	38	DF	(Saudi Arabia)	Mohammed Harboush	1	0	0	1
Total					28	3	0	31

Last Updated: 27 May 2024

=== Clean sheets ===
Rank	No.	Pos	Nat	Name	Pro League	King Cup	Arab Club Champions Cup	Total
1	18	GK	(South Korea)	Kim Seung-gyu	6	0	4	10
2	1	GK	(Saudi Arabia)	Mustafa Malayekah	4	0	0	4
3	50	GK	(Saudi Arabia)	Mohammed Al-Absi	3	0	0	3
Total					13	0	4	17

Last Updated: 4 May 2024
