= 2022–23 Al-Shabab FC season =

Al-Shabab
2022–23 season
- President: Khaled Al-Baltan
- Manager: Vicente Moreno
- Stadium: Prince Faisal bin Fahd Stadium
- SPL: 4th
- King Cup: Round of 16 (knocked out by Al-Ittihad)
- Champions League: Quarter-finals (knocked out by Al-Duhail)
- Arab Club Champions Cup: Group stage
- Top goalscorer: League: Cristian Guanca (13 goals); All: Cristian Guanca (14 goals)
- Highest home attendance: 9,379 (vs. Al-Tai, 8 September 2022)
- Lowest home attendance: 767 (vs. Al-Taawoun, 27 May 2023)
- Average home league attendance: 4,591
- All statistics correct as of 31 May 2023.

The 2022–23 season is Al-Shabab's 46th non-consecutive season in the top flight of Saudi football and 76th year in existence as a football club. The club will participate in the Pro League, the King Cup, the 2022 AFC Champions League, and the 2023 Arab Club Champions Cup.

The season covers the period from 1 July 2022 to 30 June 2023.

== Players ==
=== Squad information ===
As of 1 February 2023

Note: Flags indicate national team as defined under FIFA eligibility rules; some limited exceptions apply. Players may hold more than one non-FIFA nationality.

No.	Pos.	Nation	Player
1	GK	KSA	Zaid Al-Bawardi
4	DF	BRA	Iago Santos
5	DF	KSA	Hassan Tambakti
6	MF	KSA	Majed Kanabah
7	MF	KSA	Turki Al-Ammar
8	MF	ARG	Cristian Guanca
9	FW	GAB	Aaron Boupendza
10	MF	ARG	Éver Banega (captain)
11	MF	KSA	Hattan Bahebri
12	DF	KSA	Khalid Al-Ghamdi
13	FW	BRA	Carlos
14	MF	KSA	Nawaf Al-Abed
15	MF	KSA	Hussain Al-Qahtani
16	DF	KSA	Hussain Al-Sibyani
18	GK	KOR	Kim Seung-gyu
22	GK	KSA	Fawaz Al-Qarni
23	MF	POL	Grzegorz Krychowiak (on loan from Krasnodar)

No.	Pos.	Nation	Player
24	DF	KSA	Moteb Al-Harbi
25	DF	KSA	Saeed Al-Rubaie
26	MF	KSA	Mohammed Eisa
27	DF	KSA	Fawaz Al-Sqoor
28	MF	KSA	Nasser Al-Bishi
32	FW	KSA	Saad Al-Muwallad
34	FW	KSA	Fares Al-Garzae
35	GK	KSA	Hussain Shae'an
37	MF	KSA	Abdullah Matuq
38	DF	KSA	Mohammed Harboush
50	GK	KSA	Mohammed Al-Absi
71	FW	ERI	Ahmed Abdu
77	MF	ESP	Santi Mina (on loan from Celta Vigo)
87	FW	KSA	Fares Al-Owais
88	DF	KSA	Nader Al-Sharari
89	MF	KSA	Riyadh Sharahili
90	MF	KSA	Fahad Al-Muwallad

=== Out on loan ===
Note: Flags indicate national team as defined under FIFA eligibility rules; some limited exceptions apply. Players may hold more than one non-FIFA nationality.

No.	Pos.	Nation	Player
29	DF	KSA	Abdullah Al-Rubaie (at Najran until 30 June 2023)
30	MF	KSA	Abdulelah Al-Shammeri (at Damac until 30 June 2023)
52	MF	KSA	Abdullah Haqawi (at Jeddah until 30 June 2023)
85	MF	KSA	Hamad Al-Ghamdi (at Al-Taraji until 30 June 2023)

No.	Pos.	Nation	Player
86	MF	KSA	Marzouq Al-Dossary (at Al-Shaeib until 30 June 2023)
—	MF	KSA	Abdullah Al-Jouei (at Al-Tai until 30 June 2023)
—	MF	BRA	Paulinho (at Al-Fayha until 30 June 2023)

== Transfers and loans ==
=== Transfers in ===
Entry date	Position	No.	Player	From club	Fee	Ref.
30 June 2022	GK	–	(Saudi Arabia) Marwan Al-Haidari	(Saudi Arabia) Al-Fayha	End of loan	
30 June 2022	MF	6	(Saudi Arabia) Jamal Bajandouh	(Saudi Arabia) Al-Tai	End of loan	
30 June 2022	MF	8	(Argentina) Cristian Guanca	(United Arab Emirates) Al-Ain	End of loan	
30 June 2022	MF	–	(Saudi Arabia) Abdulelah Al-Shammeri	(Saudi Arabia) Al-Hazem	End of loan	
30 June 2022	MF	–	(Saudi Arabia) Hamad Al-Ghamdi	(Saudi Arabia) Al-Shoulla	End of loan	
30 June 2022	MF	–	(Saudi Arabia) Mohammed Attiyah	(Saudi Arabia) Al-Tai	End of loan	
30 June 2022	FW	–	(Saudi Arabia) Abdulaziz Al-Shahrani	(Saudi Arabia) Al-Shoulla	End of loan	
1 July 2022	DF	25	(Saudi Arabia) Saeed Al-Rubaie	(Saudi Arabia) Al-Ettifaq	Free	
1 July 2022	MF	19	(England) Mo Adams	(United States) Inter Miami	Free	
1 July 2022	MF	26	(Saudi Arabia) Mohammed Eisa	(Saudi Arabia) Najran	Free	
1 July 2022	FW	71	(Eritrea) Ahmed Abdu	(Saudi Arabia) Al-Shabab	Free	
5 July 2022	GK	18	(South Korea) Kim Seung-gyu	(Japan) Kashiwa Reysol	$950,000	
9 August 2022	FW	9	(Gabon) Aaron Boupendza	(Qatar) Al-Arabi	$4,200,000	
28 August 2022	MF	90	(Saudi Arabia) Fahad Al-Muwallad	(Saudi Arabia) Al-Ittihad	Free	
26 January 2023	MF	6	(Saudi Arabia) Majed Kanabah	(Saudi Arabia) Al-Fateh	Undisclosed	
28 January 2023	MF	89	(Saudi Arabia) Riyadh Sharahili	(Saudi Arabia) Abha	Undisclosed	

=== Loans in ===
Start date	End date	Position	No.	Player	From club	Fee	Ref.
8 July 2022	End of season	MF	23	(Poland) Grzegorz Krychowiak	(Russia) Krasnodar	None	
23 August 2022	End of season	FW	77	(Spain) Santi Mina	(Spain) Celta de Vigo	None	

=== Transfers out ===
Exit date	Position	No.	Player	To club	Fee	Ref.
30 June 2022	FW	99	(Argentina) Luciano Vietto	(Saudi Arabia) Al-Hilal	End of loan	
1 July 2022	DF	20	(Saudi Arabia) Ahmed Sharahili	(Saudi Arabia) Al-Ittihad	Free	
15 July 2022	FW	80	(Cameroon) John Mary	(Japan) Avispa Fukuoka	Free	
19 July 2022	DF	17	(Saudi Arabia) Abdullah Al-Shamekh	(Saudi Arabia) Al-Fayha	Free	
27 July 2022	DF	–	(Saudi Arabia) Nawaf Al-Qumairi	(Saudi Arabia) Al-Tai	Free	
27 July 2022	MF	6	(Saudi Arabia) Jamal Bajandouh	(Saudi Arabia) Al-Tai	Free	
9 August 2022	GK	–	(Saudi Arabia) Marwan Al-Haidari	(Saudi Arabia) Al-Khaleej	Free	
21 August 2022	MF	–	(Saudi Arabia) Mohammed Attiyah	(Saudi Arabia) Al-Ain	Free	
23 August 2022	DF	39	(Saudi Arabia) Nawaf Al-Dawsari	(Saudi Arabia) Al-Shoulla	Free	
24 August 2022	MF	81	(Senegal) Alfred N'Diaye		Released	
28 January 2023	MF	21	(Saudi Arabia) Nasser Al-Omran	(Saudi Arabia) Abha	Undisclosed	
18 April 2023	MF	14	(Saudi Arabia) Nawaf Al-Abed		Released	

=== Loans out ===
Start date	End date	Position	No.	Player	To club	Fee	Ref.
30 July 2022	End of season	MF	16	(Brazil) Paulinho	(Saudi Arabia) Al-Fayha	None	
4 August 2022	End of season	MF	18	(Saudi Arabia) Abdulelah Al-Shammeri	(Saudi Arabia) Damac	None	
23 August 2022	End of season	MF	52	(Saudi Arabia) Abdullah Haqawi	(Saudi Arabia) Jeddah	None	
30 August 2022	End of season	MF	–	(Saudi Arabia) Abdullah Al-Jouei	(Saudi Arabia) Al-Tai	None	
27 January 2023	End of season	DF	29	(Saudi Arabia) Abdullah Al-Rubaie	(Saudi Arabia) Najran	None	
29 January 2023	End of season	MF	85	(Saudi Arabia) Hamad Al-Ghamdi	(Saudi Arabia) Al-Taraji	None	
1 February 2023	End of season	MF	86	(Saudi Arabia) Marzouq Al-Dossari	(Saudi Arabia) Al-Shaeib	None	

== Pre-season ==
27 July 2022 Friendly	Al-Shabab (Saudi Arabia)	2–1	(Spain) Las Palmas	Marbella, Spain
18:30 CEST	Bahebri 1'; Al-Ghamdi 19'	Report	García 3'	Stadium: Dama de Noche Football Pitches

31 July 2022 Friendly	Al-Shabab (Saudi Arabia)	1–2	(Spain) Real Zaragoza	Marbella, Spain
19:00 CEST	Guanca 59'	Report	Jair 79'; Azón 86'	Stadium: La Quinta Football Center

5 August 2022 Friendly	Al-Shabab (Saudi Arabia)	2–2	(Spain) Algeciras	Marbella, Spain
10:00 CEST	Banega 81', 88'	Report	Admonio 41'; Roni 46'	Stadium: Marbella Football Center

6 August 2022 Friendly	Al-Shabab (Saudi Arabia)	0–6	(Spain) Celta Vigo	Vigo, Spain
20:00 CEST		Report	Paciência 30'; Aspas 35', 45', 61', 67', 69'	Stadium: Balaídos

10 August 2022 Friendly	Al-Shabab (Saudi Arabia)	2–1	(Spain) Real Balompédica	Marbella, Spain
18:30 CEST	Guanca 80'; Al-Rubaie 88'	Report	Oliva 53'	Stadium: Marbella Football Center

19 August 2022 Friendly	Al-Shabab (Saudi Arabia)	2–1	(Saudi Arabia) Al-Adalah	Riyadh, Saudi Arabia
19:15 AST	Guanca; Al-Abed (pen.)	Report	Lenis	Stadium: Prince Khalid bin Sultan Stadium

== Competitions ==
=== Overview ===
Competition	Record							
Competition	G	W	D	L	GF	GA	GD	Win %
Pro League	30	17	5	8	57	33	+24	56.67
King Cup	1	0	1	0	1	1	+0	0.00
Champions League	2	1	0	1	3	2	+1	50.00
Arab Club Champions Cup	4	2	2	0	9	3	+6	50.00
Total	37	20	8	9	70	39	+31	54.05

Updated to match played 31 May 2023
Source: Competitions

=== Pro League ===
==== League table ====
Pos	Team	Pld	W	D	L	GF	GA	GD	Pts	Qualification or relegation
2	Al-Nassr	30	20	7	3	63	18	+45	67	Qualified for the AFC Champions League play-off round
3	Al-Hilal (Note: Al-Hilal qualified for the AFC Champions League group stage as the 2022–23 King Cup winners.)	30	17	8	5	54	29	+25	59	Qualified for the AFC Champions League group stage
4	Al-Shabab	30	17	5	8	57	33	+24	56	
5	Al-Taawoun	30	16	7	7	46	34	+12	55	
6	Al-Fateh	30	13	4	13	48	43	+5	43	

Updated to match(es) played on 31 May 2023. Source: SPL
Rules for classification: 1) Points; 2) Head-to-head points; 3) Head-to-head goal difference; 4) Total goal difference; 5) Total goals scored; 6) Fair-play points (Note: Head-to-head record is used only after all the matches between the teams in question have been played).

==== Results summary ====
Overall								Home						Away					
Pld	W	D	L	GF	GA	GD	Pts	W	D	L	GF	GA	GD	W	D	L	GF	GA	GD
30	17	5	8	57	33	+24	56	10	2	3	28	10	+18	7	3	5	29	23	+6

Last updated: 31 May 2023.
Source: spl.com.sa

==== Results by round ====
Round	1	2	3	4	5	6	7	8	9	10	11	12	13	14	15	16	17	18	19	20	21	22	23	24	25	26	27	28	29	30
Ground	H	A	H	A	A	H	A	H	H	A	H	A	H	A	H	A	H	A	H	H	A	H	A	A	H	A	H	A	H	A
Result	W	W	W	W	W	W	D	W	D	L	W	L	D	D	W	W	W	W	L	W	D	W	W	L	W	L	L	L	L	W
Position	2	1	1	1	1	1	1	1	2	2	2	2	4	4	2	3	3	3	3	3	3	3	3	3	3	3	3	3	4	4

Updated to match(es) played on 31 May 2023. Source: spl.com.sa
A = Away; H = Home; W = Win; D = Draw; L = Loss

==== Matches ====
All times are local, AST (UTC+3).

Win Draw Loss Postponed

26 August 2022 1	Al-Shabab	3–0	Al-Batin	Riyadh
21:00	Boupendza 22'; Carlos 48'; Mina 75'	Report	Al-Hurayji (yellow card) 68'	Stadium: Prince Faisal bin Fahd Stadium; Attendance: 6,041; Referee: Faisal Al-Blwi

1 September 2022 2	Abha	0–4	Al-Shabab	Abha
21:00	Al Hamsal (yellow card) 59'; Al-Jumayah (yellow card) 62'	Report	Guanca 25' (pen.); Mina 39'; Carlos 44'; Bahebri 90'	Stadium: Prince Sultan bin Abdul Aziz Stadium; Attendance: 6,909; Referee: Mohammed Al-Harbi

8 September 2022 3	Al-Shabab	4–0	Al-Tai	Riyadh
21:00	Al-Sqoor (yellow card) 15'; Guanca 27', 70' (pen.); Mina (yellow card) 50'; Boupendza 62' (pen.); Carlos 82'	Report	Semedo (yellow card) 9'; Al-Jubairi (yellow card) 61'	Stadium: Prince Faisal bin Fahd Stadium; Attendance: 9,379; Referee: Sami Al-Jires

14 September 2022 4	Al-Adalah	0–1	Al-Shabab	Al-Hasa
21:00	Edson (yellow card) 37'	Report	Carlos 3'; Bahebri (yellow card) 89'	Stadium: Prince Abdullah bin Jalawi Stadium; Attendance: 7,392; Referee: Shukri Al-Hanfoush

2 October 2022 5	Al-Fayha	1–2	Al-Shabab	Al Majma'ah
18:20	Nwakaeme 36' (pen.); Al-Safri (yellow card) 79'; Mandash (yellow card) 90+3'	Report	Al-Sqoor (yellow card) 35'; Krychowiak 55', 71'; Guanca (yellow card) 58'	Stadium: Al Majma'ah Sports City; Attendance: 4,028; Referee: Faisal Al-Blwi

6 October 2022 6	Al-Shabab	1–0	Al-Raed	Riyadh
21:00	Salem 22' (o.g.); Santos (yellow card) 51'; Al-Sqoor (yellow card) 86'	Report	Pablo (yellow card) 83'	Stadium: Prince Faisal bin Fahd Stadium; Attendance: 7,458; Referee: Mohammed Al-Esmaiel

10 October 2022 7	Al-Hilal	1–1	Al-Shabab	Riyadh
20:30	Marega 21', (yellow card) 34'; Cuéllar (yellow card) 38'; Al-Juwayr (yellow card) 90+5'	Report	Mina (yellow card) 38'; Carlos 56'	Stadium: Prince Faisal bin Fahd Stadium; Attendance: 14,151; Referee: Eber Aquino (Paraguay)

15 October 2022 8	Al-Shabab	4–0	Al-Khaleej	Riyadh
20:30	Carlos 2'; Guanca 59'; Boupendza 86'; Abdu Jaber 90+3'	Report		Stadium: Prince Faisal bin Fahd Stadium; Attendance: 7,354; Referee: Majed Al-Shamrani

26 December 2022 10	Al-Fateh	4–1	Al-Shabab	Al-Hasa
15:30	Bendebka 41' (pen.); Kanabah 51'; Al-Khulaif 55'; Vélez (yellow card) 74'; Batna 90+7' (pen.)	Report	Santos (yellow card) 45+2'; Mina 49', (yellow card) 87'; Al-Tambakti (yellow card) 69'; Bahebri (yellow card) 77'	Stadium: Prince Abdullah bin Jalawi Stadium; Attendance: 7,362; Referee: Mohammed Al-Hoaish

30 December 2022 11	Al-Shabab	3–0	Al-Ettifaq	Riyadh
20:30	Mina 21'; Santos 45+1'; Banega (yellow card) 56'; Al-Khateeb 86' (o.g.)	Report	Mahnashi (yellow card) 43'	Stadium: Prince Faisal bin Fahd Stadium; Attendance: 2,781; Referee: Mohammed Al-Esmaiel

5 January 2023 12	Al-Wehda	2–1	Al-Shabab	Mecca
20:30	Hawsawi (yellow card) 27' (yellow-red card) 90+3'; Al-Jayzani (yellow card) 40'; Fajr 53' (pen.); Al-Ghamdi 64', (yellow card) 76'	Report	Carlos 15'; Mina (yellow card) 52'	Stadium: King Abdul Aziz Stadium; Attendance: 2,765; Referee: Ahmed Al-Rumaikhani

9 January 2023 9	Al-Shabab	1–1	Al-Ittihad	Riyadh
21:15	Guanca 22' (pen.); Santos (yellow card) 74'	Report	Hegazi (yellow card) 20', (goal) 24'; Al-Shanqeeti (yellow card) 45+1'	Stadium: Prince Faisal bin Fahd Stadium; Attendance: 6,361; Referee: Szymon Marciniak (Poland)

14 January 2023 13	Al-Shabab	0–0	Al-Nassr	Riyadh
20:30	Guanca (yellow card) 69'; Banega (yellow card) 77'	Report	Gustavo (yellow card) 67'; Álvaro (yellow card) 75'	Stadium: Prince Faisal bin Fahd Stadium; Attendance: 4,493; Referee: Clément Turpin (France)

20 January 2023 14	Al-Taawoun	1–1	Al-Shabab	Buraidah
20:30	Naldo (yellow card) 27'; Medrán (yellow card) 68', (goal) 75'	Report	Al-Harbi 41'; Mina (yellow card) 63'; Al-Qahtani (yellow card) 90+5'	Stadium: King Abdullah Sport City Stadium; Attendance: 6,228; Referee: Shukri Al-Hanfoush

27 January 2023 18	Al-Tai	1–2	Al-Shabab	Ha'il
18:00	Sayoud 9'; Al-Sultan (yellow card) 33'; Ali (yellow card) 43'; Martínez (yellow card) 64'	Report	Carlos 18', 38'; Al-Qahtani (yellow card) 90+4'	Stadium: Prince Abdul Aziz bin Musa'ed Stadium; Attendance: 8,680; Referee: Sultan Al-Harbi

2 February 2023 15	Al-Shabab	2–1	Damac	Riyadh
18:00	Mina 9'; Carlos 10'	Report	Al-Shamrani (yellow card) 3'; Makin 90+1'	Stadium: Prince Faisal bin Fahd Stadium; Attendance: 2,551; Referee: Faisal Al-Blwi

9 February 2023 16	Al-Batin	2–4	Al-Shabab	Hafar al-Batin
16:00	López 31'; Peyre (yellow card) 62'; Y. Al-Shammari 86'	Report	Guanca 45' (pen.), 45+6'; Banega 62' (pen.); Carlos 83'; Kanabah (yellow card) 90'; Santos (yellow card) 90+1'	Stadium: Al-Batin Club Stadium; Attendance: Abdullah Al-Shehri; Referee: 3,517

14 February 2023 17	Al-Shabab	2–0	Abha	Riyadh
18:00	Banega 22'; Carlos 56'	Report	Natiq (yellow card) 71'	Stadium: Prince Faisal bin Fahd Stadium; Attendance: 3,927; Referee: Raed Al-Zahrani

4 March 2023 19	Al-Shabab	1–2	Al-Adalah	Riyadh
20:30	Boupendza 20', (yellow card) 73'; Al-Qahtani (yellow card) 68'	Report	Al-Oufi (yellow card) 24'; Tijanić 62'; Eugénio (yellow card) 73', (goal) 90+7'; Al-Salem (yellow card) 81'; Al-Jamaan (yellow card) 90+6'; Al-Sultan (yellow card) 90+10'	Stadium: Prince Faisal bin Fahd Stadium; Attendance: 3,850; Referee: Abdullah Al-Harbi

9 March 2023 20	Al-Shabab	3–2	Al-Fayha	Riyadh
20:30	Boupendza 15'; Guanca 36'; Mina 39'; Al-Qahtani (yellow card) 69'; Al-Harbi (yellow card) 79'; Banega (yellow card) 87'	Report	Al-Shuwaish (yellow card) 44'; Santos 45+2' (o.g.); Ryller (yellow card) 49'; Nwakaeme 53'; Paulinho (yellow card) 66'; Al-Baqawi (yellow card) 87'	Stadium: Prince Faisal bin Fahd Stadium; Attendance: 2,298; Referee: Mohammed Al-Harbi

18 March 2023 21	Al-Raed	2–2	Al-Shabab	Buraidah
20:30	Tavares 25'; Mitriță 37'; M. Al-Dossari (yellow card) 42'; Salem (yellow card) 90+4'	Report	Krychowiak 58'; Boupendza 75'	Stadium: King Abdullah Sport City Stadium; Attendance: 1,631; Referee: Khaled Al-Teris

7 April 2023 22	Al-Shabab	3–0	Al-Hilal	Riyadh
22:00	Al-Qahtani 55'; Guanca 68'; Boupendza (yellow card) 79'; Bahebri 90+7'	Report	Ighalo (yellow card) 35'; Cuéllar (red card) 76'; Jang Hyun-soo (yellow card) 80'	Stadium: Prince Faisal bin Fahd Stadium; Attendance: 7,355; Referee: Majed Al-Shamrani

11 April 2023 23	Al-Khaleej	2–3	Al-Shabab	Dammam
22:00	Cikalleshi (yellow card) 12', (goal) 38'; Martins 14', (yellow card) 64'	Report	Guanca 3'; Boupendza 6'; Al-Qahtani (yellow card) 20', (goal) 59'; Al-Sqoor (yellow card) 49'; Santos (yellow card) 90+1'	Stadium: Prince Mohamed bin Fahd Stadium; Attendance: 1,771; Referee: Sami Al-Jires

27 April 2023 24	Al-Ittihad	2–1	Al-Shabab	Jeddah
21:30	Hamdallah 18' (pen.), 90+16' (pen.), (yellow card) 90+12'; Coronado (yellow card) 41'; Grohe (yellow card) 50'; Hegazi (yellow card) 88'; Z. Hawsawi (red card) 90+5'	Report	Guanca 68' (pen.); Al-Tambakti (yellow card) 86'; Al-Qahtani (yellow card) 90+5'; Krychowiak (yellow card) 90+14'	Stadium: King Abdullah Sports City; Attendance: 49,915; Referee: Srđan Jovanović (Serbia)

3 May 2023 25	Al-Shabab	1–0	Al-Fateh	Riyadh
21:30	Krychowiak (yellow card) 45+4'; Banega 52'; Mina (yellow card) 60'; Kim Seung-gyu (yellow card) 89'; Al-Sibyani (yellow card) 90+3'	Report	Lajami (yellow card) 51' (yellow-red card) 90+3'; Petros (yellow card) 56'	Stadium: Prince Faisal bin Fahd Stadium; Attendance: 2,957; Referee: Andris Treimanis (Latvia)

14 May 2023 26	Al-Ettifaq	1–0	Al-Shabab	Dammam
19:00	Quaison 17'	Report	Santos (yellow card) 90+2'	Stadium: Prince Mohamed bin Fahd Stadium; Attendance: 6,950; Referee: Faisal Al-Blwi

18 May 2023 27	Al-Shabab	0–1	Al-Wehda	Riyadh
19:00	Santos (yellow card) 73'	Report	Yoda 13'; Noor (yellow card) 90+7'; Al Hejji (yellow card) 90+10'	Stadium: Prince Faisal bin Fahd Stadium; Attendance: 1,295; Referee: Mamdouh Al Shahdan

23 May 2023 28	Al-Nassr	3–2	Al-Shabab	Riyadh
21:30	Gustavo (yellow card) 30'; González (yellow card) 31'; Talisca 44'; Lajami (yellow card) 45+2'; Ghareeb 51'; Ronaldo 59'; Al-Najei (yellow card) 73'	Report	Guanca 25' (pen.), 40'; Mina (yellow card) 45+2'; Carlos (yellow card) 58'; Banega (yellow card) 72'; Krychowiak (yellow card) 90+1'	Stadium: Al-Awwal Park; Attendance: 19,045; Referee: Daniele Orsato (Italy)

27 May 2023 29	Al-Shabab	0–3	Al-Taawoun	Riyadh
21:00	Guanca (red card) 60'; Abdu Jaber (yellow card) 86'	Report	Tawamba 34'; Medrán (yellow card) 45+5'; Al-Nasser 52', (yellow card) 72'; Flávio 59'	Stadium: Prince Faisal bin Fahd Stadium; Attendance: 767; Referee: Sultan Al-Harbi

31 May 2023 30	Damac	1–4	Al-Shabab	Abha
21:00	Makin 22'; Al-Najei (red card) 49'; Nono (yellow card) 67'; Al-Shammeri (yellow card) 80'	Report	Boupendza 13', 65', 89', 90+3'; Santos (yellow card) 45+2'; Al-Qahtani (yellow card) 59'; Krychowiak (yellow card) 72'	Stadium: Prince Sultan bin Abdul Aziz Stadium; Attendance: 609; Referee: Mohammed Al-Harbi

=== King Cup ===
All times are local, AST (UTC+3).

22 December 2022 Round of 16	Al-Ittihad	1–1 (a.e.t.) (4–3 p)	Al-Shabab	Jeddah
21:00	Hegazi (yellow card) 45+3'; Hamdallah 48', (yellow card) 120+2'; Hamed (yellow card) 53'; Grohe (yellow card) 120+1'	Report	Al-Muwallad (yellow card) 25'; Al-Harbi 40', (yellow card) 90+8'; Krychowiak (yellow card) 45+8'; Al-Tambakti (yellow card) 120+1'	Stadium: King Abdullah Sports City; Attendance: 32,144; Referee: Georgi Kabakov (Bulgaria)
	Penalties
	Hamdallah (penalty scored); Al-Saiari (penalty scored); Al-Bishi (penalty scored); Al-Nashri (penalty missed); Romarinho (penalty scored)		(penalty scored) Guanca; (penalty scored) Bahebri; (penalty scored) Santos; (penalty missed) Krychowiak; (penalty missed) Banega

=== AFC Champions League ===
==== Knockout phase ====
19 February 2023 Round of 16	Al-Shabab (Saudi Arabia)	2–0	(Uzbekistan) Nasaf Qarshi	Al Wakrah, Qatar
21:00 UTC+3	Tambakti (yellow card) 7'; Al-Qahtani 12'; Banega 54'	Report		Stadium: Al Janoub Stadium; Attendance: 700; Referee: Adham Makhadmeh (Jordan)

23 February 2023 Quarter-finals	Al-Duhail (Qatar)	2–1	(Saudi Arabia) Al-Shabab	Doha, Qatar
18:00 UTC+3	Luiz Jr. (yellow card) 62'; Olunga 77', 85'	Report	Bahebri (yellow card) 81'; Al-Rubaie 90+3'	Stadium: Al Thumama Stadium; Attendance: 7,138; Referee: Mohanad Qasim Sarray (Iraq)

=== Arab Club Champions Cup ===
==== First qualifying round ====
13 March 2023 First leg	Al-Quwa Al-Jawiya (Iraq)	1–1	(Saudi Arabia) Al-Shabab	Basra, Iraq
17:00 UTC+3	Nabeel 38'	Report	Boupendza 69', (yellow card) 71'	Stadium: Basra International Stadium; Referee: Ali Reda (Lebanon)

16 April 2023 Second leg	Al-Shabab (Saudi Arabia)	4–0 (5–1 agg.)	(Iraq) Al-Quwa Al-Jawiya	Riyadh, Saudi Arabia
22:00 UTC+3	Boupendza 19'; Al-Sqoor (yellow card) 43'; Banega 73'; Al-Tambakti 80'; Al-Ghamdi (yellow card) 85'; Guanca 90+1'	Report	Atchou (yellow card) 44'; Akakpo (yellow card) 57'	Stadium: Prince Faisal bin Fahd Stadium; Referee: Mohamed Adel (Egypt)

==== Second qualifying round ====
7 May 2023 First leg	Tishreen (Syria)	1–1	(Saudi Arabia) Al-Shabab	Riyadh, Saudi Arabia
20:30 UTC+3	Mobayed 53', (yellow card) 65'; Asaad (yellow card) 79'; Al Nakdali (yellow card) 86'; Al-Munajed (yellow card) 87'; Al Khouli (yellow card) 90+1'	Report	Kanabah (yellow card) 39'; Al-Harbi (yellow card) 57'; Harboush (yellow card) 89'; Mina 90+3'	Stadium: Prince Faisal bin Fahd Stadium; Referee: Amin Omar (Egypt)

11 May 2023 Second leg	Al-Shabab (Saudi Arabia)	3–1 (4–2 agg.)	(Syria) Tishreen	Riyadh, Saudi Arabia
20:30 UTC+3	Abdu Jaber 17', 75'; Carlos 37' (pen.); Al-Sibyani (yellow card) 66'	Report	Abu Zainab (yellow card) 40'; Al-Mohamad (yellow card) 87'; Hatem 90+3'	Stadium: Prince Faisal bin Fahd Stadium; Referee: Redouane Jiyed (Morocco)

== Statistics ==
=== Appearances ===
Last updated on 31 May 2023.

No.	Pos	Nat	Player	Total		Pro League		King Cup		Champions League		Arab Club Champions Cup	
No.	Pos	Nat	Player	Apps	Goals	Apps	Goals	Apps	Goals	Apps	Goals	Apps	Goals
Goalkeepers
18	GK	(South Korea) KOR	Kim Seung-gyu	37	0	30	0	1	0	2	0	4	0
22	GK	(Saudi Arabia) KSA	Fawaz Al-Qarni	0	0	0	0	0	0	0	0	0	0
35	GK	(Saudi Arabia) KSA	Hussain Shae'an	0	0	0	0	0	0	0	0	0	0
50	GK	(Saudi Arabia) KSA	Mohammed Al-Absi	0	0	0	0	0	0	0	0	0	0
Defenders
4	DF	(Brazil) BRA	Iago Santos	32	1	28	1	1	0	0	0	3	0
5	DF	(Saudi Arabia) KSA	Hassan Tambakti	33	1	27	0	1	0	2	0	2+1	1
12	DF	(Saudi Arabia) KSA	Khalid Al-Ghamdi	5	0	1+2	0	0	0	0	0	1+1	0
16	DF	(Saudi Arabia) KSA	Hussain Al-Sibyani	14	0	3+8	0	0+1	0	0	0	1+1	0
24	DF	(Saudi Arabia) KSA	Moteb Al-Harbi	35	2	27+1	1	1	1	2	0	3+1	0
25	DF	(Saudi Arabia) KSA	Saeed Al-Rubaie	9	1	2+5	0	0	0	1+1	1	0	0
27	DF	(Saudi Arabia) KSA	Fawaz Al-Sqoor	35	0	28+1	0	1	0	2	0	3	0
38	DF	(Saudi Arabia) KSA	Mohammed Harboush	2	0	0	0	0	0	0	0	0+2	0
88	DF	(Saudi Arabia) KSA	Nader Al-Sharari	14	0	2+8	0	0	0	1	0	1+2	0
Midfielders
6	MF	(Saudi Arabia) KSA	Majed Kanabah	9	0	0+5	0	0	0	0+1	0	3	0
7	MF	(Saudi Arabia) KSA	Turki Al-Ammar	20	0	2+13	0	0+1	0	0+2	0	1+1	0
8	MF	(Argentina) ARG	Cristian Guanca	36	14	29	13	1	0	2	0	2+2	1
10	MF	(Argentina) ARG	Éver Banega	30	5	22+2	3	1	0	2	1	2+1	1
11	MF	(Saudi Arabia) KSA	Hattan Bahebri	30	2	10+15	2	0+1	0	2	0	1+1	0
15	MF	(Saudi Arabia) KSA	Hussain Al-Qahtani	32	3	22+4	2	0	0	2	1	3+1	0
23	MF	(Poland) POL	Grzegorz Krychowiak	35	3	30	3	1	0	0	0	3+1	0
26	MF	(Saudi Arabia) KSA	Mohammed Eisa	0	0	0	0	0	0	0	0	0	0
89	MF	(Saudi Arabia) KSA	Riyadh Sharahili	17	0	4+8	0	0	0	2	0	3	0
90	MF	(Saudi Arabia) KSA	Fahad Al-Muwallad	14	0	1+10	0	1	0	0+2	0	0	0
Forwards
9	FW	(Gabon) GAB	Aaron Boupendza	20	13	15+2	11	0	0	0	0	3	2
13	FW	(Brazil) BRA	Carlos	27	13	20+2	12	1	0	1	0	2+1	1
32	FW	(Saudi Arabia) KSA	Saad Al-Muwallad	0	0	0	0	0	0	0	0	0	0
34	FW	(Saudi Arabia) KSA	Fares Al-Garzae	0	0	0	0	0	0	0	0	0	0
71	FW	(Eritrea) ERI	Ahmed Abdu Jaber	30	3	1+24	1	0+1	0	0	0	2+2	2
77	FW	(Spain) ESP	Santi Mina	32	7	25+2	6	1	0	1	0	1+2	1
Player who made an appearance this season but have left the club
14	MF	(Saudi Arabia) KSA	Nawaf Al-Abed	9	0	1+8	0	0	0	0	0	0	0
21	MF	(Saudi Arabia) KSA	Nasser Al-Omran	2	0	0+2	0	0	0	0	0	0	0

=== Goalscorers ===
Rank	No.	Pos	Nat	Name	Pro League	King Cup	Champions League	Arab Club Champions Cup	Total
1	8	MF	(Argentina)	Cristian Guanca	13	0	0	1	14
2	9	FW	(Gabon)	Aaron Boupendza	11	0	0	2	13
2	13	FW	(Brazil)	Carlos	12	0	0	1	13
4	77	FW	(Spain)	Santi Mina	6	0	0	1	7
5	10	MF	(Argentina)	Éver Banega	3	0	1	1	5
6	15	MF	(Saudi Arabia)	Hussain Al-Qahtani	2	0	1	0	3
6	23	MF	(Poland)	Grzegorz Krychowiak	3	0	0	0	3
6	71	FW	(Eritrea)	Ahmed Abdu Jaber	1	0	0	2	3
9	11	MF	(Saudi Arabia)	Hattan Bahebri	2	0	0	0	2
9	24	DF	(Saudi Arabia)	Moteb Al-Harbi	1	1	0	0	2
11	4	DF	(Brazil)	Iago Santos	1	0	0	0	1
11	5	DF	(Saudi Arabia)	Hassan Tambakti	0	0	0	1	1
11	25	DF	(Saudi Arabia)	Saeed Al-Rubaie	0	0	1	0	1
Own goal					2	0	0	0	2
Total					57	1	3	9	70

Last Updated: 31 May 2023

=== Assists ===
Rank	No.	Pos	Nat	Name	Pro League	King Cup	Champions League	Arab Club Champions Cup	Total
1	27	DF	(Saudi Arabia)	Fawaz Al-Sqoor	5	0	1	1	7
2	10	MF	(Argentina)	Éver Banega	5	0	1	0	6
2	24	DF	(Saudi Arabia)	Moteb Al-Harbi	3	0	0	3	6
4	77	FW	(Spain)	Santi Mina	5	0	0	0	5
5	9	FW	(Gabon)	Aaron Boupendza	3	0	0	1	4
5	11	MF	(Saudi Arabia)	Hattan Bahebri	4	0	0	0	4
7	8	MF	(Argentina)	Cristian Guanca	3	0	0	0	3
7	15	MF	(Saudi Arabia)	Hussain Al-Qahtani	2	0	1	0	3
9	7	MF	(Saudi Arabia)	Turki Al-Ammar	1	0	0	1	2
9	13	FW	(Brazil)	Carlos	2	0	0	0	2
9	23	MF	(Poland)	Grzegorz Krychowiak	2	0	0	0	2
9	90	MF	(Saudi Arabia)	Fahad Al-Muwallad	1	1	0	0	2
13	4	DF	(Brazil)	Iago Santos	1	0	0	0	1
13	16	DF	(Saudi Arabia)	Hussain Al-Sibyani	1	0	0	0	1
13	71	FW	(Eritrea)	Ahmed Abdu Jaber	0	0	0	1	1
Total					38	1	3	7	49

Last Updated: 31 May 2023

=== Clean sheets ===
Rank	No.	Pos	Nat	Name	Pro League	King Cup	Champions League	Arab Club Champions Cup	Total
1	18	GK	(South Korea)	Kim Seung-gyu	11	0	1	1	13
Total					11	0	1	1	13

Last Updated: 3 May 2023
