= 2021–22 Al-Shabab FC season =

Al-Shabab
2021–22 season
- President: Khaled Al-Baltan
- Manager: Péricles Chamusca (until 23 March); Marius Șumudică (from 23 March)
- Stadium: Prince Faisal bin Fahd Stadium; King Fahd International Stadium
- SPL: 4th
- King Cup: Semi-finals (knocked out by Al-Hilal)
- Champions League: Round of 16
- Top goalscorer: League: Carlos (13); All: Carlos (22)
- Highest home attendance: 11,234 (vs. Al-Ittihad, 13 March 2022)
- Lowest home attendance: 0 (vs. Al-Faisaly, 12 May 2022)
- Average home league attendance: 5,645
- All statistics correct as of 27 June 2022.

The 2021–22 season was Al-Shabab's 45th non-consecutive season in the top flight of Saudi football and 75th year in existence as a football club. The club participated in the Pro League, the King Cup and the AFC Champions League.

The season covered the period from 1 July 2021 to 30 June 2022.

== Players ==
=== Squad information ===
As of 1 September 2021

Note: Flags indicate national team as defined under FIFA eligibility rules; some limited exceptions apply. Players may hold more than one non-FIFA nationality.

No.	Pos.	Nation	Player
1	GK	KSA	Zaid Al-Bawardi
2	DF	CHI	Igor Lichnovsky
4	DF	KSA	Abdullah Al-Zori
5	DF	KSA	Hassan Tambakti
6	MF	KSA	Jamal Bajandouh
7	MF	KSA	Turki Al-Ammar
8	MF	BRA	Paulinho
9	FW	NGR	Odion Ighalo
10	MF	ARG	Éver Banega
11	MF	KSA	Hattan Bahebri
12	DF	KSA	Khalid Al-Ghamdi
13	FW	BRA	Carlos
14	MF	KSA	Nawaf Al-Abed
15	MF	KSA	Hussain Al-Qahtani
17	DF	KSA	Abdullah Al-Shamekh

No.	Pos.	Nation	Player
19	DF	KSA	Khalid Al-Dubaysh
20	DF	KSA	Ahmed Sharahili
21	MF	KSA	Nasser Al-Omran
22	GK	KSA	Fawaz Al-Qarni
24	DF	KSA	Moteb Al-Harbi
25	FW	KSA	Fares Al-Owais
26	DF	KSA	Ali Majrashi
27	DF	KSA	Fawaz Al-Sqoor
29	MF	KSA	Abdullah Al-Jouei
34	FW	KSA	Fares Al-Garzae
35	GK	KSA	Hussain Shae'an
37	FW	KSA	Abdullah Matuq
81	MF	SEN	Alfred N'Diaye
88	DF	KSA	Nader Al-Sharari
92	MF	BRA	Sebá

=== Out on loan ===
Note: Flags indicate national team as defined under FIFA eligibility rules; some limited exceptions apply. Players may hold more than one non-FIFA nationality.

No.	Pos.	Nation	Player
16	MF	KSA	Mohammed Attiyah (at Al-Tai until 30 June 2022)
23	GK	KSA	Marwan Al-Haidari (at Al-Fayha until 30 June 2022)
30	MF	KSA	Abdulelah Al-Shammeri (at Al-Hazem until 30 June 2022)

No.	Pos.	Nation	Player
31	FW	KSA	Abdulaziz Al-Shahrani (at Al-Shoulla until 30 June 2022)
—	MF	KSA	Hamad Al-Ghamdi (at Al-Shoulla until 30 June 2022)
—	MF	ARG	Cristian Guanca (at Al-Ain until 30 June 2022)

== Transfers and loans ==
=== Transfers in ===
Entry date	Position	No.	Player	From club	Fee	Ref.
30 June 2021	DF	26	(Saudi Arabia) Ali Majrashi	(Saudi Arabia) Al-Faisaly	End of loan	
30 June 2021	MF	16	(Saudi Arabia) Mohammed Attiyah	(Saudi Arabia) Damac	End of loan	
30 June 2021	MF	28	(Saudi Arabia) Abdulmalek Al-Shammeri	(Saudi Arabia) Al-Batin	End of loan	
30 June 2021	MF	30	(Saudi Arabia) Abdulelah Al-Shammeri	(Saudi Arabia) Al-Tai	End of loan	
30 June 2021	MF	52	(Saudi Arabia) Abdullah Haqawi	(Saudi Arabia) Al-Lewaa	End of loan	
30 June 2021	MF	56	(Saudi Arabia) Hassan Al-Qayd	(Saudi Arabia) Al-Ahli	End of loan	
30 June 2021	FW	29	(The Gambia) Bubacarr Trawally	(United Arab Emirates) Ajman	End of loan	
1 July 2021	GK	35	(Saudi Arabia) Hussain Shae'an	(Saudi Arabia) Al-Taawoun	Free	
1 July 2021	DF	88	(Saudi Arabia) Nader Al-Sharari	(Saudi Arabia) Abha	Free	
1 July 2021	MF	29	(Saudi Arabia) Abdullah Al-Jouei	(Saudi Arabia) Al-Taawoun	Free	
1 July 2021	FW	44	(Saudi Arabia) Muhannad Assiri	(Saudi Arabia) Al-Ahli	Free	
24 July 2021	GK	22	(Saudi Arabia) Fawaz Al-Qarni	(Saudi Arabia) Al-Ittihad	$1,000,000	
28 July 2021	MF	8	(Brazil) Paulinho	(Portugal) Boavista	$1,180,000	
20 August 2021	FW	13	(Brazil) Carlos	(Portugal) Santa Clara	$2,900,000	
31 August 2021	MF	11	(Saudi Arabia) Hattan Bahebri	(Saudi Arabia) Al-Hilal	$530,000	
30 January 2022	DF	3	(Brazil) Iago Santos	(Saudi Arabia) Al-Taawoun	$1,500,000	
30 January 2022	FW	80	(Cameroon) John Mary	(China) Shenzhen	Free	

=== Loans in ===
Start date	End date	Position	No.	Player	From club	Fee	Ref.
29 January 2022	End of season	FW	99	(Argentina) Luciano Vietto	(Saudi Arabia) Al-Hilal	None	

=== Transfers out ===
Exit date	Position	No.	Player	To club	Fee	Ref.
30 June 2021	MF	11	(Portugal) Fábio Martins	(Portugal) Braga	End of loan	
1 July 2021	DF	12	(Saudi Arabia) Mohammed Salem	(Saudi Arabia) Al-Raed	Free	
1 July 2021	MF	6	(Saudi Arabia) Abdulmalek Al-Khaibri		Released	
4 August 2021	FW	29	(The Gambia) Bubacarr Trawally	(United Arab Emirates) Ajman	Free	
6 August 2021	GK	50	(Saudi Arabia) Mohammed Al-Dossari	(Saudi Arabia) Al-Shoulla	Free	
7 August 2021	FW	44	(Saudi Arabia) Muhannad Assiri		Retired	
19 August 2021	MF	38	(Saudi Arabia) Ammar Al-Najjar	(Saudi Arabia) Damac	Undisclosed	
24 August 2021	MF	56	(Saudi Arabia) Hassan Al-Qayd	(Saudi Arabia) Abha	Free	
31 August 2021	MF	28	(Saudi Arabia) Abdulmalek Al-Shammeri	(Saudi Arabia) Al-Fayha	Undisclosed	
14 January 2022	MF	–	(Saudi Arabia) Nawaf Al-Shahrani	(Saudi Arabia) Al-Saqer	Free	
19 January 2022	DF	2	(Chile) Igor Lichnovsky	(Mexico) Tigres	$3,500,000	
25 January 2022	DF	26	(Saudi Arabia) Ali Majrashi	(Saudi Arabia) Al-Ahli	$800,000	
27 January 2022	DF	19	(Saudi Arabia) Khalid Al-Dubaysh	(Saudi Arabia) Damac	Free	
28 January 2022	DF	4	(Saudi Arabia) Abdullah Al-Zori	(Saudi Arabia) Abha	Free	
29 January 2022	FW	9	(Nigeria) Odion Ighalo	(Saudi Arabia) Al-Hilal	$3,500,000	

=== Loans out ===
Start date	End date	Position	No.	Player	To club	Fee	Ref.
9 July 2021	End of season	MF	8	(Argentina) Cristian Guanca	(United Arab Emirates) Al-Ain	None	
26 July 2021	End of season	MF	26	(Saudi Arabia) Hamad Al-Ghamdi	(Saudi Arabia) Al-Shoulla	None	
1 August 2021	End of season	MF	16	(Saudi Arabia) Mohammed Attiyah	(Saudi Arabia) Al-Tai	None	
15 August 2021	End of season	MF	30	(Saudi Arabia) Abdulelah Al-Shammeri	(Saudi Arabia) Al-Hazem	None	
20 August 2021	End of season	FW	31	(Saudi Arabia) Abdulaziz Al-Shahrani	(Saudi Arabia) Al-Shoulla	None	
30 August 2021	End of season	GK	23	(Saudi Arabia) Marwan Al-Haidari	(Saudi Arabia) Al-Fayha	None	
8 January 2022	End of season	MF	6	(Saudi Arabia) Jamal Bajandouh	(Saudi Arabia) Al-Tai	None	

== Pre-season ==
14 July 2021 Friendly	Al-Shabab (Saudi Arabia)	8–0	(Gibraltar) Europa Point	Marbella, Spain
18:00 CEST	Ighalo, Sebá; Lichnovsky; Assiri, Al-Abed; Al-Jouei	Report		Stadium: Marbella Football Center

21 July 2021 Friendly	Al-Shabab (Saudi Arabia)	2–2	(Spain) Rayo Vallecano	Marbella, Spain
19:00 CEST	Ighalo,	Report	Martín,	Stadium: Marbella Football Center

27 July 2021 Friendly	Al-Shabab (Saudi Arabia)	1–2	(England) Wolverhampton	Marbella, Spain
19:00 CEST	N'Diaye 27'	Report	Campbell 63'; Jiménez 88' (pen.)	Stadium: Marbella Football Center

29 July 2021 Friendly	Al-Shabab (Saudi Arabia)	3–2	(Spain) Algeciras	Marbella, Spain
19:00 CEST	Majrashi 45'; Al-Abed 51'; Ighalo 61'	Report	Figueras 4'; Gallego 37'	Stadium: Marbella Football Center

5 August 2021 Friendly	Al-Shabab (Saudi Arabia)	1–1	(Saudi Arabia) Al-Fayha	Riyadh, Saudi Arabia
19:20 AST	Banega 77'	Report	Owusu 73'	Stadium: Prince Khalid bin Sultan Stadium

== Competitions ==
=== Overview ===
Competition	Record							
Competition	G	W	D	L	GF	GA	GD	Win %
Pro League	30	15	10	5	52	36	+16	50.00
King Cup	3	2	0	1	8	3	+5	66.67
Champions League	6	5	1	0	18	1	+17	83.33
Total	39	22	11	6	78	40	+38	56.41

Updated to match played 27 June 2022
Source: Competitions

=== Pro League ===
==== League table ====
Pos	Team	Pld	W	D	L	GF	GA	GD	Pts
2	Al-Ittihad	30	20	5	5	62	29	+33	65
3	Al-Nassr	30	19	4	7	58	36	+22	61
4	Al-Shabab	30	15	10	5	52	36	+16	55
5	Damac	30	12	8	10	38	44	−6	44
6	Al-Tai	30	11	4	15	33	45	−12	37

Source: spl.com
Rules for classification: 1) Points; 2) Head-to-head points; 3) Head-to-head goal difference; 4) Total goal difference; 5) Total goals scored; 6) Fair-play points (Note: Head-to-head record is used only after all the matches between the teams in question have been played).

==== Results summary ====
Overall								Home						Away					
Pld	W	D	L	GF	GA	GD	Pts	W	D	L	GF	GA	GD	W	D	L	GF	GA	GD
30	15	10	5	52	36	+16	55	9	5	1	28	12	+16	6	5	4	24	24	0

Last updated: 27 June 2022.
Source: spl.com.sa

==== Results by round ====
Round	1	2	3	4	5	6	7	8	9	10	11	12	13	14	15	16	17	18	19	20	21	22	23	24	25	26	27	28	29	30
Ground	A	H	A	H	A	H	H	A	A	H	H	A	H	H	A	H	A	H	A	H	A	A	H	H	A	A	H	A	A	H
Result	L	D	L	W	D	D	W	W	W	W	W	D	W	W	W	D	D	D	W	W	L	W	W	L	D	L	W	W	D	D
Position	11	13	15	10	11	10	8	6	3	3	2	3	2	2	2	2	2	3	3	2	3	3	2	3	4	4	4	4	4	4

Updated to match(es) played on 27 June 2022. Source: spl.com.sa
A = Away; H = Home; W = Win; D = Draw; L = Loss

==== Matches ====
All times are local, AST (UTC+3).

Win Draw Loss Postponed

12 August 2021 1	Abha	2–1	Al-Shabab	Abha
19:15	Bguir 9'; Amr (yellow card) 15' te Vrede 41' (pen.), (yellow card) 45+5'; Al-Zowayed (yellow card) 90'	Report	Banega 57' (pen.); Lichnovsky (yellow card) 79'	Stadium: Prince Sultan bin Abdul Aziz Stadium; Attendance: 2,219; Referee: Mohammed Al-Hoaish

21 August 2021 2	Al-Shabab	3–3	Al-Ettifaq	Riyadh
20:50	Ighalo 39', 49'; Banega 45+5' (pen.); Lichnovsky (red card) 87'	Report	Azaro 77'; Quaison 80' (pen.); Al-Mowalad (yellow card) 84'; Mahnashi 88'; Al-Dossari (yellow card) 90+1'	Stadium: King Fahd International Stadium; Attendance: 6,113; Referee: Khaled Al-Teris

26 August 2021 3	Al-Fateh	2–0	Al-Shabab	Al-Hasa
18:45	Al-Fuhaid (yellow card) 16'; Al-Buraikan 25'; Saâdane (yellow card) 52'; Boushal 87'	Report	Banega (red card) 21'; Majrashi (yellow card) 74' (yellow-red card) 84'; Al-Qahtani (yellow card) 83'; Al-Harbi (yellow card) 84'; Ighalo (yellow card) 84'	Stadium: Prince Abdullah bin Jalawi Stadium; Attendance: 2,644; Referee: Turki Al-Khudhayr

12 September 2021 4	Al-Shabab	2–0	Al-Hazem	Riyadh
20:35	Ighalo 3', 87'; Paulinho (red card) 42'	Report	Bakheet (yellow card) 45+3'; Alison (yellow card) 75'	Stadium: Prince Faisal bin Fahd Stadium; Attendance: 5,218; Referee: Khalid Al-Juhani

17 September 2021 5	Damac	1–1	Al-Shabab	Abha
18:45	Hawsawi (yellow card) 17' (yellow-red card) 70'; Zelaya 85' (pen.)	Report	Banega 73' (pen.)	Stadium: Prince Sultan bin Abdul Aziz Stadium; Attendance: 5,207; Referee: Mohammed Al-Hoaish

23 September 2021 6	Al-Shabab	2–2	Al-Hilal	Riyadh
20:25	Ighalo 2'; Bahebri (yellow card) 57', (goal) 61'	Report	Gomis 14' (pen.); Pereira (yellow card) 42'; Cuéllar (yellow card) 42'; Al Bulaihi (yellow card) 45+1', (goal) 70'; Kanno (yellow card) 55'	Stadium: King Fahd International Stadium; Attendance: 8,679; Referee: Turki Al-Khudhayr

1 October 2021 7	Al-Shabab	2–1	Al-Fayha	Riyadh
18:20	Carlos 23'; Sharahili 27'; Al-Harbi (yellow card) 57'	Report	Al-Khaibari (yellow card) 1'; Lopes 9'; Al-Safri (yellow card) 40'; Mandash (yellow card) 90+5'	Stadium: Prince Faisal bin Fahd Stadium; Attendance: 3,595; Referee: Khaled Salwi

16 October 2021 8	Al-Batin	0–3	Al-Shabab	Hafar al-Batin
18:00	Al-Alawi (yellow card) 27'; Abreu (yellow card) 38'	Report	Carlos 24'; Bahebri 29'; Al-Ammar (yellow card) 31'; Ighalo 72'	Stadium: Al-Batin Club Stadium; Attendance: 2,514; Referee: Sami Al-Jires

22 October 2021 9	Al-Ittihad	0–2	Al-Shabab	Jeddah
20:00	Al-Shamrani (red card) 50'; El Ahmadi (yellow card) 70'; Romarinho (yellow card) 70'; Al-Aboud (yellow card) 72'; Abdulhamid (yellow card) 73'	Report	Ighalo 22', 68'; Sharahili (yellow card) 39'; Banega (yellow card) 48'	Stadium: Prince Abdullah Al-Faisal Stadium; Attendance: 19,558; Referee: Faisal Al-Blwi

28 October 2021 10	Al-Shabab	3–0	Al-Tai	Riyadh
19:50	Carlos 3'; Ighalo 23'; Al-Qahtani 62'	Report	Fallatah (yellow card) 64'; Al-Khalaf (yellow card) 80'	Stadium: Prince Faisal bin Fahd Stadium; Attendance: 5,569; Referee: Ahmad Al-Rumaikhani

5 November 2021 11	Al-Shabab	1–0	Al-Nassr	Riyadh
17:50	Bahebri (yellow card) 12', (goal) 23'; Paulinho (yellow card) 26'	Report	Qassem (yellow card) 21'; Al-Amri (yellow card) 67'; Funes Mori (yellow card) 90+3'	Stadium: Prince Faisal bin Fahd Stadium; Attendance: 8,092; Referee: Mario Díaz de Vivar (Paraguay)

20 November 2021 12	Al-Faisaly	0–0	Al-Shabab	Al Majma'ah
17:45	Ismael (yellow card) 65'	Report	Paulinho (yellow card) 18'; Carlos (yellow card) 43'; Al-Harbi (yellow card) 90+1'	Stadium: Al Majma'ah Sports City; Attendance: 6,182; Referee: Mohammed Al-Hoaish

25 November 2021 13	Al-Shabab	3–0	Al-Raed	Riyadh
19:40	Al-Harbi 19'; Sharahili (yellow card) 21'; Lichnovsky (yellow card) 52'; Banega 55'; Carlos 73'	Report	Al-Farhan (yellow card) 35'; Eduardo (yellow card) 57'	Stadium: King Fahd International Stadium; Attendance: 3,405; Referee: Majed Al-Shamrani

27 December 2021 14	Al-Shabab	3–1	Al-Taawoun	Riyadh
17:50	Banega (yellow card) 12'; Ighalo 24'; Paulinho (yellow card) 32'; Carlos 36'; Lichnovsky (yellow card) 45+1'; Bahebri 82'	Report	Luvannor (yellow card) 12'; Santos 33'; Abdullah (yellow card) 40'; Al-Saluli (yellow card) 51'; Al-Amri (yellow card) 53'	Stadium: Prince Faisal bin Fahd Stadium; Attendance: 3,862; Referee: Ovidiu Hațegan (Romania)

1 January 2022 15	Al-Ahli	3–4	Al-Shabab	Jeddah
19:50	Dankler (yellow card) 14'; Asiri 39'; Alioski 44' (pen.), (yellow card) 64'; Ghareeb 52', (yellow card) 70'; Al-Khabrani (yellow card) 57'	Report	Majrashi 16' (o.g.); Banega 18'; Bahebri (yellow card) 33', (goal) 71'; Ighalo 73'; Al-Omran (yellow card) 90+6'	Stadium: Prince Abdullah Al-Faisal Stadium; Attendance: 7,870; Referee: Faisal Al-Blwi

8 January 2022 16	Al-Shabab	1–1	Abha	Riyadh
18:00	Lichnovsky (yellow card) 36'; Al-Barakah 58' (o.g.); Banega (yellow card) 62'	Report	Al-Qayd 8'; Mboungou (yellow card) 56'	Stadium: Prince Faisal bin Fahd Stadium; Attendance: 5,818; Referee: Mohammed Al-Hoaish

14 January 2022 17	Al-Ettifaq	2–2	Al-Shabab	Dammam
17:50	Souza 33'; Kiss 37'	Report	Al-Qahtani (yellow card) 22'; Banega (yellow card) 45+2'; Sharahili 60'; Carlos 64'	Stadium: Prince Mohamed bin Fahd Stadium; Attendance: 8,190; Referee: Majed Al-Shamrani

20 January 2022 18	Al-Shabab	1–1	Al-Fateh	Riyadh
18:10	N'Diaye (yellow card) 12'; Ighalo 66', (yellow card) 78'; Majrashi (yellow card) 88'	Report	Al-Buraikan (yellow card) 26'; Cueva (yellow card) 31'; Boushal (yellow card) 70'; Batna 78', (yellow card) 79'	Stadium: Prince Faisal bin Fahd Stadium; Attendance: 4,747; Referee: Sami Al-Jires

5 February 2022 19	Al-Hazem	1–2	Al-Shabab	Ar Rass
15:50	Abdullah S. (yellow card) 35'; Al-Khalaf (yellow card) 36'; John 39'	Report	Carlos 44'; Vietto 51'; Paulinho (yellow card) 74'; Bahebri (yellow card) 79'; Al-Harbi (yellow card) 90+3'; Al-Qarni (yellow card) 90+5'; N'Diaye (yellow card) 90+7'	Stadium: Al-Hazem Club Stadium; Attendance: 2,618; Referee: Raed Al-Zahrani

10 February 2022 20	Al-Shabab	2–1	Damac	Riyadh
18:20	Vietto 14', (yellow card) 90+2'; Carlos 55'; Al-Sqoor (yellow card) 59'; Al-Shamekh (yellow card) 88'	Report	Zeghba (yellow card) 4'; Al-Ammar (yellow card) 43'; Zelaya 45' (pen.); Al-Yami (yellow card) 79'	Stadium: Prince Faisal bin Fahd Stadium; Attendance: 3,911; Referee: Faisal Al-Blwi

17 February 2022 21	Al-Hilal	5–0	Al-Shabab	Riyadh
20:40	Ighalo 18', 43'; Carrillo 25'; Marega 30', 82'; Abdulhamid (yellow card) 60'; Al-Faraj (yellow card) 78'; Cuéllar (yellow card) 86'	Report	N'Diaye (yellow card) 56' (yellow-red card) 64'; Santos (yellow card) 90+5'	Stadium: Prince Faisal bin Fahd Stadium; Attendance: 7,704; Referee: Mario Díaz de Vivar (Paraguay)

27 February 2022 22	Al-Fayha	1–2	Al-Shabab	Al Majma'ah
20:40	Al-Safri 58'	Report	Mary 41'; Paulinho (yellow card) 51'; Al-Harbi (yellow card) 64'; Al-Abed 80'	Stadium: Al Majma'ah Sports City; Attendance: 3,327; Referee: Abdullah Al-Harbi

5 March 2022 23	Al-Shabab	4–0	Al-Batin	Riyadh
20:45	Al-Ammar 2'; Al-Alawi 35' (o.g.); Sharahili (yellow card) 36'; Al-Harbi (yellow card) 52'; Paulinho 66'; Banega 79' (pen.); Shae'an (yellow card) 85'	Report	Chaves (yellow card) 39'; M. Al-Qarni (yellow card) 55'	Stadium: Prince Faisal bin Fahd Stadium; Attendance: 3,099; Referee: Abdullah Al-Shehri

13 March 2022 24	Al-Shabab	0–2	Al-Ittihad	Riyadh
20:45	Bahebri (yellow card) 35'; Paulinho (yellow card) 38'; Banega (yellow card) 85'	Report	Al-Sahafi (yellow card) 15'; Al-Muwallad (yellow card) 18'; Al-Hafith (yellow card) 21'; Al-Bishi 45'; Romarinho 50'; André (yellow card) 77'	Stadium: Prince Faisal bin Fahd Stadium; Attendance: 11,234; Referee: Anastasios Sidiropoulos (Greece)

18 March 2022 25	Al-Tai	2–2	Al-Shabab	Ha'il
19:00	Ali (yellow card) 25'; Al-Sultan (yellow card) 32'; Dener 51'; Figueroa 78'	Report	Carlos 39', 69'; Paulinho (yellow card) 88'	Stadium: Prince Abdul Aziz bin Musa'ed Stadium; Attendance: 7,336; Referee: Mohammed Al-Harbi

6 May 2022 26	Al-Nassr	4–2	Al-Shabab	Riyadh
20:50	Al-Amri 18'; Talisca 31' (pen.), 50'; Al-Sulaiheem 34'; K. Al-Ghannam (yellow card) 51'	Report	N'Diaye (yellow card) 10'; Al-Qarni (yellow card) 28'; Carlos (yellow card) 45+3', (goal) 80'; Al-Ammar 55'; Banega (yellow card) 69'; Santos (yellow card) 72'	Stadium: Mrsool Park; Attendance: 7,709; Referee: Mohammed Al-Hoaish

12 May 2022 27	Al-Shabab	1–0	Al-Faisaly	Riyadh
20:50	Bahebri 75', (yellow card) 82'	Report	Malayekah (red card) 30'; Ismael (yellow card) 40'; Qassem (yellow card) 88'	Stadium: Prince Faisal bin Fahd Stadium; Attendance: 0 Referee: Majed Al-Shamrani

27 May 2022 28	Al-Raed	0–2	Al-Shabab	Buraidah
21:00	René (yellow card) 45+2'	Report	Carlos 4', 31'	Stadium: King Abdullah Sport City Stadium; Attendance: 7,980; Referee: Shukri Al-Hanfoushi

23 June 2022 29	Al-Taawoun	1–1	Al-Shabab	Buraidah
21:00	El Mahdioui 53'; Medrán (yellow card) 81'	Report	Bahebri 29'; Al-Abed (yellow card) 57'; Al-Qahtani (yellow card) 68'; Santos (yellow card) 90+2'	Stadium: King Abdullah Sport City Stadium; Attendance: 3,837; Referee: Majed Al-Shamrani

27 June 2022 30	Al-Shabab	0–0	Al-Ahli	Riyadh
21:00	Al-Qahtani (yellow card) 13'; Tambakti (yellow card) 39'; Banega (red card) 90+7'	Report	Al-Khabrani (yellow card) 80'; Hindi (yellow card) 90'	Stadium: Prince Faisal bin Fahd Stadium; Attendance: 5,687; Referee: Mohammed Al-Hoaish

=== King Cup ===
All times are local, AST (UTC+3).

19 December 2021 Round of 16	Al-Shabab	5–0	Damac	Riyadh
20:00	Al-Harbi 50'; Al-Qahtani (yellow card) 51'; Carlos 57', 60'; Chafaï 71' (o.g.); Al-Ammar 83'; Al-Abed (red card) 89'	Report	Al-Ammar (yellow card) 53'; Vittor (yellow card) 90'	Stadium: King Fahd International Stadium; Referee: Sultan Al-Harbi

21 February 2022 Quarter-finals	Al-Shabab	2–1	Al-Ahli	Riyadh
20:40	Carlos 49', 86' (pen.); Paulinho (yellow card) 73' (yellow-red card) 90+1'; Al-Sqoor (yellow card) 87'	Report	Ghareeb (yellow card) 27'; Bradarić 60'; Kom (yellow card) 70'; Yahya (yellow card) 73'; Dankler (yellow card) 84'	Stadium: Prince Faisal bin Fahd Stadium; Referee: Sergey Ivanov (Russia)

3 April 2022 Semi-finals	Al-Hilal	2–1	Al-Shabab	Riyadh
22:00	Al-Shahrani (yellow card) 65'; Al-Faraj 73'; Ighalo 104'; Al-Shehri (yellow card) 113'	Report	N'Diaye (yellow card) 39'; Banega 63' (pen.); Al-Ammar (yellow card) 80'	Stadium: Prince Faisal bin Fahd Stadium; Referee: Roberto Tobar (Chile)

=== AFC Champions League ===
==== Group stage ====
Pos	Team	Pld	W	D	L	GF	GA	GD	Pts	Qualification	SHB	MUM	QWJ	AJZ
1	(Saudi Arabia) Al-Shabab (H)	6	5	1	0	18	1	+17	16	Advance to Round of 16	—	6–0	3–0	3–0
2	(India) Mumbai City	6	2	1	3	3	11	−8	7 (Note: Head-to-head points: Mumbai City 6, Al-Quwa Al-Jawiya 0.)		0–3	—	1–0	0–0
3	(Iraq) Al-Quwa Al-Jawiya	6	2	1	3	7	10	−3	7		1–1	1–2	—	3–2
4	(United Arab Emirates) Al-Jazira	6	1	1	4	4	10	−6	4		0–2	1–0	1–2	—

Source: AFC
Rules for classification: Tiebreakers
(H) Hosts
Notes:

8 April 2022 1	Mumbai City (India)	0–3	(Saudi Arabia) Al-Shabab	Riyadh, Saudi Arabia
20:15 UTC+3	V. Singh (yellow card) 31'; Lachenpa (yellow card) 35'; M. Singh (yellow card) 87'	Report	Banega 36' (pen.), 68'; Al-Ammar 77'	Stadium: Prince Faisal bin Fahd Stadium; Attendance: 3,000; Referee: Mohd Amirul Izwan Yaacob (Malaysia)

11 April 2022 2	Al-Shabab (Saudi Arabia)	3–0	(United Arab Emirates) Al-Jazira	Riyadh, Saudi Arabia
23:15 UTC+3	Carlos 6', 78'; Al-Abed (yellow card) 17'; Al-Ammar 18'; Sharahili (yellow card) 89'	Report	Jamal (yellow card) 81'	Stadium: Prince Faisal bin Fahd Stadium; Attendance: 1,329; Referee: Hettikamkanamge Perera (Sri Lanka)

14 April 2022 3	Al-Quwa Al-Jawiya (Iraq)	1–1	(Saudi Arabia) Al-Shabab	Riyadh, Saudi Arabia
23:15 UTC+3	Hadi (yellow card) 7'; Mohammed (yellow card) 42'; Miller 68', (yellow card) 84'; Kadhim (yellow card) 73'	Report	N'Diaye (yellow card) 57'; Banega (yellow card) 68'; Al-Qahtani (yellow card) 72', (goal) 90+6'	Stadium: Prince Faisal bin Fahd Stadium; Attendance: 1,295; Referee: Sivakorn Pu-udom (Thailand)

18 April 2022 4	Al-Shabab (Saudi Arabia)	3–0	(Iraq) Al-Quwa Al-Jawiya	Riyadh, Saudi Arabia
23:15 UTC+3	Al-Abed 30'; Al-Shamekh (yellow card) 33'; Carlos 39', 73'; Tambakti (yellow card) 70'	Report	Akakpo (yellow card) 37'; Abbood (yellow card) 42'; Kadhim (yellow card) 89'	Stadium: Prince Faisal bin Fahd Stadium; Attendance: 1,397; Referee: Ilgiz Tantashev (Uzbekistan)

22 April 2022 5	Al-Shabab (Saudi Arabia)	6–0	(India) Mumbai City	Riyadh, Saudi Arabia
23:15 UTC+3	Bahebri 19', 64', 66'; Fall 36' (o.g.); Al-Jouei 52'; Carlos 81'	Report	Bheke (yellow card) 79'; Bhumij (yellow card) 88'	Stadium: Prince Faisal bin Fahd Stadium; Attendance: 1,135; Referee: Fu Ming (China)

26 April 2022 6	Al-Jazira (United Arab Emirates)	0–2	(Saudi Arabia) Al-Shabab	Riyadh, Saudi Arabia
23:15 UTC+3		Report	Al-Sharari (yellow card) 34'; Mary 68'; Paulinho 88'	Stadium: Prince Faisal bin Fahd Stadium; Attendance: 437; Referee: Ilgiz Tantashev (Uzbekistan)

== Statistics ==
=== Appearances ===
Last updated on 27 June 2022.

No.	Pos	Nat	Player	Total		Pro League		King Cup		Champions League	
No.	Pos	Nat	Player	Apps	Goals	Apps	Goals	Apps	Goals	Apps	Goals
Goalkeepers
1	GK	(Saudi Arabia) KSA	Zaid Al-Bawardi	1	0	1	0	0	0	0	0
22	GK	(Saudi Arabia) KSA	Fawaz Al-Qarni	36	0	27	0	3	0	6	0
35	GK	(Saudi Arabia) KSA	Hussain Shae'an	3	0	1+1	0	0	0	0+1	0
50	GK	(Saudi Arabia) KSA	Mohammed Al-Absi	0	0	0	0	0	0	0	0
Defenders
3	DF	(Brazil) BRA	Iago Santos	17	0	12	0	2	0	3	0
5	DF	(Saudi Arabia) KSA	Hassan Tambakti	11	0	6+1	0	1	0	3	0
12	DF	(Saudi Arabia) KSA	Khalid Al-Ghamdi	4	0	0+1	0	0	0	0+3	0
17	DF	(Saudi Arabia) KSA	Abdullah Al-Shamekh	12	0	1+4	0	1+1	0	4+1	0
20	DF	(Saudi Arabia) KSA	Ahmed Sharahili	30	2	22	2	3	0	5	0
24	DF	(Saudi Arabia) KSA	Moteb Al-Harbi	34	2	29	1	2	1	2+1	0
27	DF	(Saudi Arabia) KSA	Fawaz Al-Sqoor	39	0	30	0	3	0	6	0
36	DF	(Saudi Arabia) KSA	Hussain Al-Sibyani	2	0	0+2	0	0	0	0	0
39	DF	(Saudi Arabia) KSA	Nawaf Al-Dawsari	0	0	0	0	0	0	0	0
88	DF	(Saudi Arabia) KSA	Nader Al-Sharari	14	0	5+3	0	0+1	0	1+4	0
Midfielders
7	MF	(Saudi Arabia) KSA	Turki Al-Ammar	27	5	10+12	2	0+2	1	2+1	2
8	MF	(Brazil) BRA	Paulinho	28	2	19+4	1	2	0	3	1
10	MF	(Argentina) ARG	Éver Banega	34	9	27	6	3	1	4	2
11	MF	(Saudi Arabia) KSA	Hattan Bahebri	33	10	24+2	7	3	0	4	3
14	MF	(Saudi Arabia) KSA	Nawaf Al-Abed	21	2	7+6	1	0+2	0	6	1
15	MF	(Saudi Arabia) KSA	Hussain Al-Qahtani	38	2	26+3	1	2+1	0	5+1	1
21	MF	(Saudi Arabia) KSA	Nasser Al-Omran	10	0	0+5	0	0+1	0	0+4	0
28	MF	(Saudi Arabia) KSA	Nasser Al-Bishi	2	0	0	0	0	0	0+2	0
29	MF	(Saudi Arabia) KSA	Abdullah Al-Jouei	26	1	3+17	0	0	0	4+2	1
52	MF	(Saudi Arabia) KSA	Abdullah Haqawi	0	0	0	0	0	0	0	0
81	MF	(Senegal) SEN	Alfred N'Diaye	21	0	11+6	0	1+2	0	1	0
Forwards
13	FW	(Brazil) BRA	Carlos	30	22	23	13	3	4	4	5
32	FW	(Saudi Arabia) KSA	Saad Al-Muwallad	5	0	0+1	0	0	0	0+4	0
34	FW	(Saudi Arabia) KSA	Fares Al-Garzae	1	0	0+1	0	0	0	0	0
37	FW	(Saudi Arabia) KSA	Abdullah Matuq	4	0	0+1	0	0	0	0+3	0
80	FW	(Cameroon) CMR	John Mary	9	2	2+4	1	0+1	0	2	1
99	FW	(Argentina) ARG	Luciano Vietto	10	2	4+3	2	2	0	1	0
Players sent out on loan this season
6	MF	(Saudi Arabia) KSA	Jamal Bajandouh	5	0	0+5	0	0	0	0	0
23	GK	(Saudi Arabia) KSA	Marwan Al-Haidari	1	0	1	0	0	0	0	0
30	MF	(Saudi Arabia) KSA	Abdulelah Al-Shammeri	1	0	0+1	0	0	0	0	0
Player who made an appearance this season but have left the club
2	DF	(Chile) CHI	Igor Lichnovsky	16	0	15	0	1	0	0	0
4	DF	(Saudi Arabia) KSA	Abdullah Al-Zori	3	0	0+3	0	0	0	0	0
9	FW	(Nigeria) NGR	Odion Ighalo	19	12	18	12	1	0	0	0
19	DF	(Saudi Arabia) KSA	Khalid Al-Dubaysh	1	0	0+1	0	0	0	0	0
26	DF	(Saudi Arabia) KSA	Ali Majrashi	14	0	4+9	0	0+1	0	0	0
28	MF	(Saudi Arabia) KSA	Abdulmalek Al-Shammeri	1	0	0+1	0	0	0	0	0
92	MF	(Brazil) BRA	Sebá	3	0	2+1	0	0	0	0	0

=== Goalscorers ===
Rank	No.	Pos	Nat	Name	Pro League	King Cup	Champions League	Total
1	13	FW	(Brazil)	Carlos	13	4	5	22
2	9	FW	(Nigeria)	Odion Ighalo	12	0	0	12
3	11	MF	(Saudi Arabia)	Hattan Bahebri	7	0	3	10
4	10	MF	(Argentina)	Éver Banega	7	0	2	9
5	7	MF	(Saudi Arabia)	Turki Al-Ammar	2	1	2	5
6	8	MF	(Brazil)	Paulinho	1	0	1	2
6	14	MF	(Saudi Arabia)	Nawaf Al-Abed	1	0	1	2
6	15	MF	(Saudi Arabia)	Hussain Al-Qahtani	1	0	1	2
6	20	DF	(Saudi Arabia)	Ahmed Sharahili	2	0	0	2
6	24	DF	(Saudi Arabia)	Moteb Al-Harbi	1	1	0	2
6	80	FW	(Cameroon)	John Mary	1	0	1	2
6	99	FW	(Argentina)	Luciano Vietto	2	0	0	2
13	29	MF	(Saudi Arabia)	Abdullah Al-Jouei	0	0	1	1
Own goal					3	1	1	5
Total					52	8	18	78

Last Updated: 23 June 2022

=== Assists ===
Rank	No.	Pos	Nat	Name	Pro League	King Cup	Champions League	Total
1	11	MF	(Saudi Arabia)	Hattan Bahebri	8	1	0	9
1	27	DF	(Saudi Arabia)	Fawaz Al-Sqoor	8	0	1	9
3	14	MF	(Saudi Arabia)	Nawaf Al-Abed	2	0	5	7
3	24	DF	(Saudi Arabia)	Moteb Al-Harbi	4	1	2	7
5	10	MF	(Argentina)	Éver Banega	4	1	0	5
6	8	MF	(Brazil)	Paulinho	3	1	0	4
7	13	FW	(Brazil)	Carlos	3	0	0	3
7	29	MF	(Saudi Arabia)	Abdullah Al-Jouei	1	0	2	3
9	2	DF	(Chile)	Igor Lichnovsky	1	0	0	1
9	3	DF	(Brazil)	Iago Santos	1	0	0	1
9	9	FW	(Nigeria)	Odion Ighalo	1	0	0	1
9	12	DF	(Saudi Arabia)	Khalid Al-Ghamdi	0	0	1	1
9	15	MF	(Saudi Arabia)	Hussain Al-Qahtani	1	0	0	1
9	20	DF	(Saudi Arabia)	Ahmed Sharahili	0	1	0	1
9	37	FW	(Saudi Arabia)	Abdullah Matuq	0	0	1	1
9	80	FW	(Cameroon)	John Mary	1	0	0	1
9	99	FW	(Argentina)	Luciano Vietto	1	0	0	1
Total					39	5	12	56

Last Updated: 23 June 2022

=== Clean sheets ===
Rank	No.	Pos	Nat	Name	Pro League	King Cup	Champions League	Total
1	22	GK	(Saudi Arabia)	Fawaz Al-Qarni	9	1	5	15
2	35	GK	(Saudi Arabia)	Hussain Shae'an	1	0	1	2
3	1	GK	(Saudi Arabia)	Zaid Al-Bawardi	1	0	0	1
Total					11	1	5	17

Last Updated: 27 June 2022
