= Abdullah Matuq =

Saudi Arabian footballer (born 2003)

Abdullah Matuq عبد الله معتوق
Personal information
- Full name: Abdullah Matuq Ahmed Saeed
- Date of birth: 2 April 2003 (age 23)
- Place of birth: Medina, Saudi Arabia
- Height: 1.70 m (5 ft 7 in)
- Position: Winger

Team information
- Current team: Al-Shabab
- Number: 37

Youth career
- –2019: Al-Ansar
- 2019–2023: Al-Shabab

Senior career*
Years	Team	Apps	(Gls)
2021–	Al-Shabab	22	(1)
2024–2025	→ Al-Jandal (loan)	28	(6)

International career
2020–	Saudi Arabia U20		
- * Club domestic league appearances and goals as of 30 October 2026

Abdullah Matuq Ahmed Saeed (Arabic: عبد الله معتوق أحمد سعيد, born 2 April 2003) is a Saudi Arabian professional footballer who plays as a winger for Al-Shabab.

== Career ==
Matuq started his career at Al-Ansar's youth team. On 1 September 2019, Matuq joined Al-Shabab's youth team. He was promoted to the first team during the 2021–22 season. On 12 August 2021, Matuq made his professional debut for Al-Shabab against Abha in the Pro League, replacing Nawaf Al-Abed. On 13 September 2024, Matuq joined Al-Jandal on a one-year loan.

== Career statistics ==
=== Club ===
As of match played 27 May 2024

Club	Season	League		King Cup		Asia		Other		Total	
Club	Season	Apps	Goals	Apps	Goals	Apps	Goals	Apps	Goals	Apps	Goals
Al-Shabab	2021–22	1	0	0	0	3	0	—		4	0
Al-Shabab	2022–23	0	0	0	0	0	0	0	0	0	0
Al-Shabab	2023–24	1	0	0	0	—		0	0	1	0
Al-Shabab	Total	2	0	0	0	3	0	0	0	5	0
Career totals		2	0	0	0	3	0	0	0	5	0

== Honours ==
=== International ===
Saudi Arabia U20

- Arab Cup U-20: 2021
