= Fawaz Al-Qarni =

Saudi Arabian footballer (born 1992)

Personal information
- Full name: Fawaz Balqassem Al-Qarni
- Date of birth: 2 April 1992 (age 34)
- Place of birth: Jeddah, Saudi Arabia
- Height: 1.83 m (6 ft 0 in)
- Position: Goalkeeper

Youth career
- –2011: Al-Ittihad

Senior career*
Years	Team	Apps	(Gls)
2012–2021	Al-Ittihad	113	(0)
2021–2024	Al-Shabab	27	(0)

International career^{‡}
2012–	Saudi Arabia	10	(0)
- * Club domestic league appearances and goals as of 28 June 2022 ‡ National team caps and goals as of 12 October 2021

Fawaz Balqassem Al-Qarni (Arabic: فواز بلقاسم القرني; born 2 April 1992) is a Saudi Arabian professional footballer who plays as a goalkeeper.

== Club career ==
Born in Jeddah, he made his debut for Al-Ittihad in a 3–0 win at home to Al Ittifaq on 6 August 2012.

On 24 July 2021, Al-Qarni joined Al-Shabab on a three-year deal.

== International career ==
He made his debut for the Saudi Arabia national team on 9 December 2012 in a 0–0 draw with Iran.

== Career statistics ==
=== Club ===
As of match played 30 May 2024

Club	Season	League		King Cup		Crown Prince Cup		Asia		Other		Total	
Club	Season	Apps	Goals	Apps	Goals	Apps	Goals	Apps	Goals	Apps	Goals	Apps	Goals
Al-Ittihad	2012–13	10	0	4	0	0	0	—		—		14	0
Al-Ittihad	2013–14	20	0	3	0	1	0	7	0	1 (Note: Appearance in Saudi Super Cup)	0	32	0
Al-Ittihad	2014–15	11	0	1	0	1	0	—		—		13	0
Al-Ittihad	2015–16	9	0	0	0	2	0	0	0	—		11	0
Al-Ittihad	2016–17	9	0	0	0	1	0	—		—		10	0
Al-Ittihad	2017–18	18	0	2	0	—		—		—		20	0
Al-Ittihad	2018–19	22	0	6	0	—		9	0	0	0	37	0
Al-Ittihad	2019–20	12	0	0	0	—		—		2 (Note: Appearances in Arab Club Champions Cup)	0	14	0
Al-Ittihad	2020–21	1	0	0	0	—		—		0	0	1	0
Al-Ittihad	Total	112	0	16	0	5	0	16	0	3	0	152	0
Al-Shabab	2021–22	27	0	3	0	—		6	0	—		36	0
Al-Shabab	2022–23	0	0	0	0	—		0	0	0	0	0	0
Al-Shabab	2023–24	0	0	0	0	—		—		0	0	0	0
Al-Shabab	Total	27	0	3	0	0	0	6	0	0	0	36	0
Career totals		139	0	19	0	5	0	22	0	3	0	188	0

== Honours ==
Al Ittihad

- King Cup of Champions: 2012–13
- Crown Prince Cup : 2016-17
- King Cup of Champions: 2017–18

Individual

- Saudi Professional League Goalkeeper of the Month: October 2021
