= Éver Banega =

Argentine footballer (born 1988)

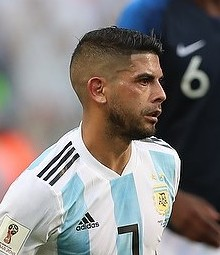
- Banega with Argentina at the 2018 FIFA World Cup

Personal information
- Full name: Éver Maximiliano David Banega
- Date of birth: 29 June 1988 (age 38)
- Place of birth: Rosario, Argentina
- Height: 1.75 m (5 ft 9 in)
- Position: Midfielder

Youth career
- Nuevo Horizonte
- Alianza Sport
- 2000–2007: Boca Juniors

Senior career*
Years	Team	Apps	(Gls)
2007	Boca Juniors	28	(0)
2008–2014	Valencia	136	(9)
2008–2009	→ Atlético Madrid (loan)	24	(1)
2014	→ Newell's Old Boys (loan)	14	(1)
2014–2016	Sevilla	59	(8)
2016–2017	Inter Milan	28	(6)
2017–2020	Sevilla	96	(9)
2020–2024	Al Shabab	94	(18)
2024–2025	Newell's Old Boys	59	(5)
2026	Defensa y Justicia	10	(0)
Total		548	(57)

International career
2007	Argentina U20	14	(0)
2008	Argentina Olympic	6	(0)
2008–2018	Argentina	65	(6)
Medal record
Men's football
Representing Argentina
FIFA U-20 World Cup
Winner	2007 Canada	U-20 Team
Olympic Games
Gold medal – first place	2008 Beijing
Copa América
Runner-up	2015 Chile
Runner-up	2016 United States
- * Club domestic league appearances and goals as of 17:02, 10 May 2026 (UTC)

Éver Maximiliano David Banega (born 29 June 1988) is an Argentine former professional footballer who played as a central midfielder.

He started his career with Boca Juniors, and signed with Valencia in 2008 where he remained for several years, appearing in 162 official games and winning the 2008 Copa del Rey. After joining Sevilla in 2014, he conquered three Europa League trophies over two spells.

Banega represented Argentina at the 2018 World Cup. Additionally, he won an Olympic medal in 2008 and appeared in three Copa América tournaments, helping the team to the final of the 2015 and 2016 editions.

== Club career ==
=== Boca Juniors ===
Born in Rosario, Santa Fe, Banega came through the youth ranks at Boca Juniors, reaching the first team at 18, and winning immediate recognition thanks to his passing average and his performances in the Primera División. After teammate midfielder Fernando Gago moved to Real Madrid in January 2007, he was named as his successor despite his young age.

Banega made his professional debut in the 4–0 win against Banfield on 10 February 2007. On 1 April, just a few matches afterwards, he was given an ovation when he left the field.

=== Valencia ===
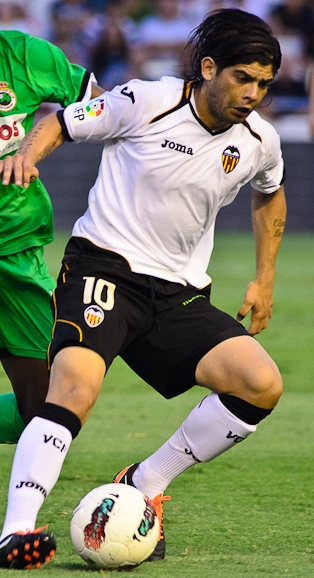
Banega in action for Valencia in 2011

On 5 January 2008, Banega signed with Spanish side Valencia on a 5 1/2-year deal, for a fee of around €20 million. He made his debut on the 13th in a 1–0 loss at Atlético Madrid, coming on as a half-time substitute.

Banega was loaned to Atlético Madrid for 2008–09. He made his official debut as a substitute during the Colchoneros's 3–0 away victory over PSV Eindhoven, in the first group stage match of the season's UEFA Champions League. However, he failed to settle in the team's starting XI, also being sent off in away draws against Villarreal and Almería.

Following his return from Atlético, it appeared that Banega was to join English club Everton, but a move did not materialise due to problems acquiring a visa. He subsequently returned for the 2009–10 campaign, and assisted both goals in Valencia's opening game against Sevilla. He scored his first goal for the Che on 17 January 2010 in a 4–1 defeat of neighbouring Villarreal.

Banega played 28 matches in 2010–11 (19 starts, two goals), as Valencia finished third and qualified for the Champions League. On 19 February 2012, however, he prolonged an existing spell on the sidelines – he had recently returned from a knee injury – after he was run over by his own car. As a result, he fractured his left ankle and broke the tibia and fibula in his left leg, according to Valencia team doctor Enrique Gastaldi. He required ankle surgery, going on to miss the remainder of the season; the club only confirmed that the player had been hurt in an accident involving his own car after leaving training, however Spanish media had reported that the injury occurred when he failed to put the handbrake on at a petrol station and, after the car moved, his leg was caught between the wheel and the curb.

On 31 January 2014, Banega was loaned to Newell's Old Boys in his country, until the end of the campaign.

=== Sevilla ===
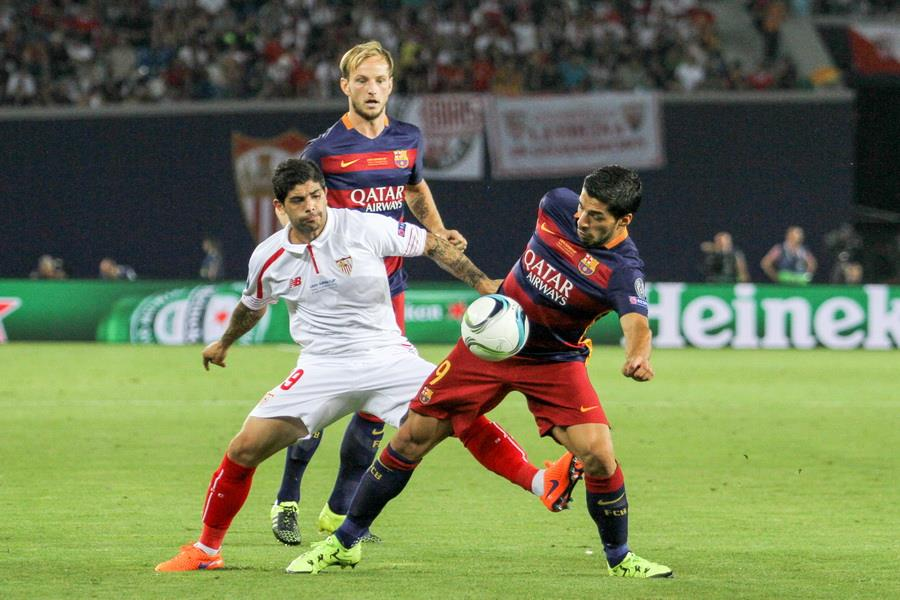
Barcelona's Luis Suárez dribbling past Banega in the 2015 UEFA Super Cup

On 19 August 2014, Banega joined Sevilla for an undisclosed fee, crediting his decision to move clubs to manager Unai Emery, who had managed him at Valencia. He made his official debut four days later, replacing Aleix Vidal for the final 20 minutes of a 1–1 draw against his former team.

On 27 May 2015, Banega started for Sevilla in the 2015 UEFA Europa League final defeat of Dnipro at Poland's National Stadium, being named player of the match in the process. On 11 August, in the ensuing edition of the UEFA Super Cup, he scored the fastest ever goal in the competition through a third-minute free kick, but in a 5–4 loss to Barcelona.

Even though he had been deemed surplus to requirements the year before by the same manager, Banega continued to be an undisputed starter in 2015–16, netting nine times in 46 competitive appearances. He played the full 90 minutes in the Europa League final, won 3–1 against Liverpool. In the final of the Copa del Rey on 22 May 2016, he was sent off for a 90th-minute tackle on Neymar in an eventual 2–0 defeat to Barcelona after extra time.

=== Inter Milan ===
On 16 May 2016, it was announced that Banega would sign for Inter Milan as a free agent, with the move being made effective on 1 July. In his first interview, he stated: "I'm very excited to play for a club like Inter", adding "I cannot wait to play for Inter." He was officially presented on 12 August, being given squad number 19.

Banega made his Serie A debut on 21 August 2016, starting and playing 70 minutes in a 2–0 away loss against ChievoVerona. On 11 September, at newly promoted Pescara, he provided the first goal of Mauro Icardi in an eventual 2–1 comeback win for the first three points of the season.

Banega was named in Inter's Europa League squad, starting in their first match against Hapoel Be'er Sheva, which finished in a 0–2 defeat at the San Siro. He scored his first goal for the nerazzurri on 2 October, but in a 2–1 away loss to Roma.

During the first part of the campaign, Banega started mostly but was also benched on occasion, which led to rumours of a possible move in the winter transfer window. On 5 March 2017 he returned to the starting XI for the league match against Cagliari, assisting Ivan Perišić and scoring himself a free kick in a 5–1 away victory. One week later, he netted his first hat-trick as a professional in the 7–1 home thrashing of Atalanta, which set a new league personal best at six goals.

=== Return to Sevilla ===
On 27 June 2017, a mere 13 months after leaving the Ramón Sánchez Pizjuán Stadium, Banega returned to Sevilla. He was sent off in his first league game in his second spell for allegedly insulting the referee, immediately after being booked for committing a foul in the last minutes of the 1–1 home draw against Espanyol.

=== Later career ===
In January 2020, it was announced that Banega would join Al Shabab of the Saudi Pro League when the Europa League, which Sevilla ultimately won, ended. Four years later, aged 35, he returned to Argentina and Newell's Old Boys.

Banega remained in the top division for the 2026 season, signing a one-year contract with Defensa y Justicia.

== International career ==
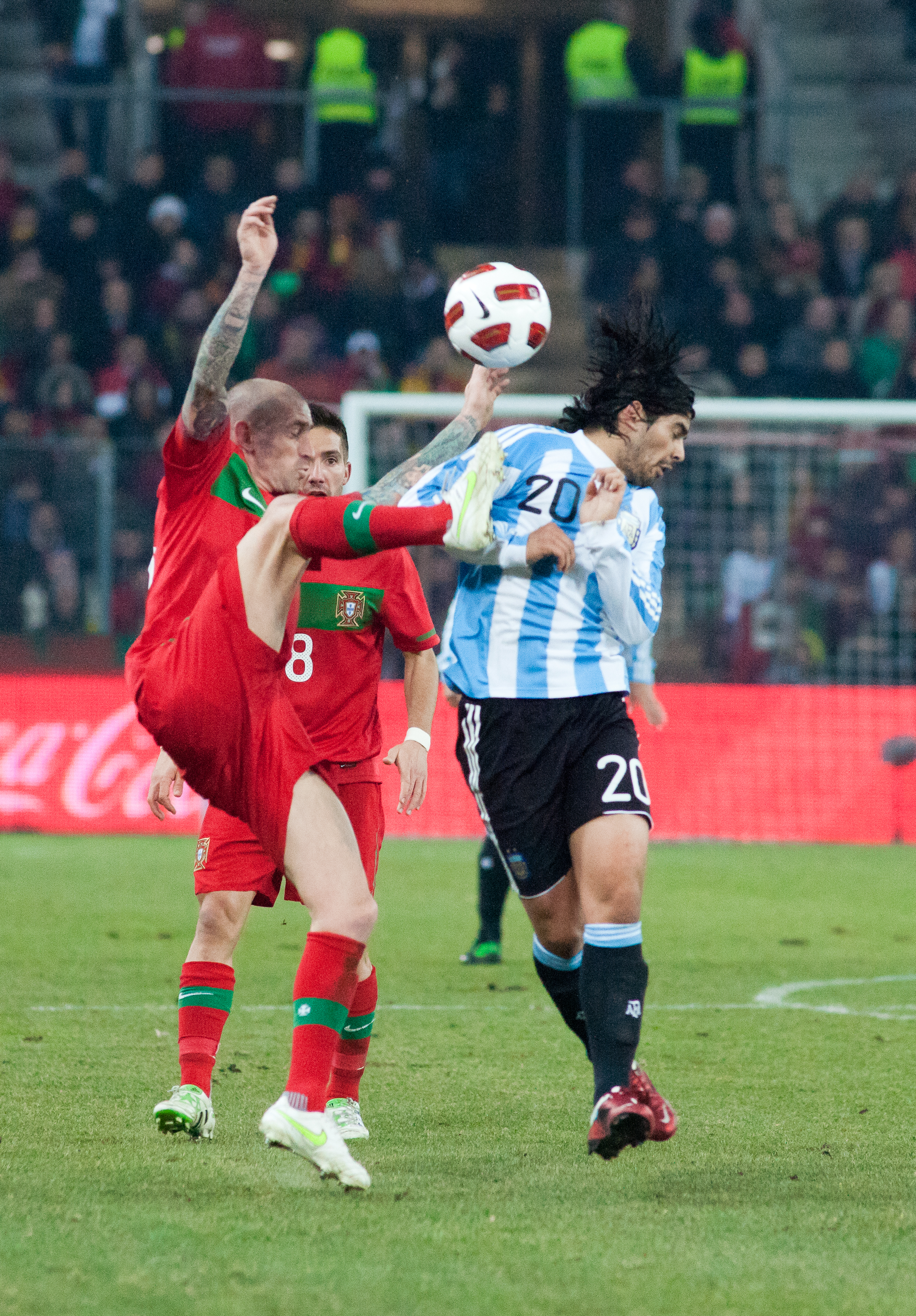
Banega and Raul Meireles of Portugal in a 2011 friendly

Banega was selected for the Argentine under-20 team, alongside Sergio Agüero, for the 2007 FIFA World Cup in Canada, appearing in all seven games for the eventual champions. Soon after joining Valencia in January 2008 he made his debut for the full side, in a 5–0 friendly win over Guatemala on 6 February which he started. During that summer, he appeared for the nation at the Summer Olympics, helping to conquer the gold medal.

In spite of a solid season with Valencia, Banega was not selected for the 2010 FIFA World Cup in South Africa by manager Diego Maradona. He was however a member of the 2011 Copa América squad, playing the first two group matches as the hosts reached the quarter-finals under Sergio Batista. On 26 March 2013 he scored his first goal, finishing a Clemente Rodríguez cross to equalise in a 1–1 draw away to Bolivia in the 2014 World Cup qualifiers, but was not chosen for the squad that appeared in the finals.

Banega was selected by coach Gerardo Martino for the 2015 Copa América, starting in the team's opening fixture against Paraguay in La Serena. He was one of two players to miss his penalty shootout attempt in the final, a 4–1 loss to Chile, with Claudio Bravo saving it.

Banega started all the games in the Copa América Centenario in the United States, lost 4–2 in the same fashion to the same opponent. Previously, in the opening match of the group stage, he had scored in a 2–1 win over the same team, also setting up Ángel Di María's first goal.

Banega was included in the final squad for the 2018 World Cup. He made his debut in the competition on 16 June, playing 36 minutes in the 1–1 group stage draw against Iceland after replacing Lucas Biglia. In the final group match against Nigeria at the Krestovsky Stadium, he assisted Lionel Messi's opening goal with a long ball over the defence; the match eventually ended in a 2–1 victory, which saw his team progress to the second round as group runners-up behind Croatia, and he also featured the entire 4–3 round-of-16 defeat to France.

== Style of play ==
A tactically intelligent and versatile playmaker, Banega is mostly known for his technical skills, dribbling ability, quick feet, vision and accurate passing, which enables him to retain possession, dictate the tempo of his team's play in midfield and create goalscoring opportunities for his teammates. Although he is usually deployed as a central midfielder, he can also be deployed as an attacking one; whilst at Boca Juniors, he operated as a defensive midfielder, or as a deep-lying playmaker due to his creativity, work-rate and ball-winning abilities, and he is also an accurate set-piece taker.

Banega's former Internazionale coach Roberto Mancini said of him: "Banega is a midfielder who likes to mix it up a lot. He can start by playing off the front man and drop deep to pick up the ball. He plays for Argentina, he's got quality and charisma and I'm sure he'll be very useful to us."

== Personal life ==
During his playing career, Banega struggled with alcoholism.

== Career statistics ==
=== Club ===
As of match played 4 May 2026

Appearances and goals by club, season and competition
Club	Season	League			National cup (Note: Includes Copa del Rey, Coppa Italia, King's Cup, Copa Argentina)		Continental		Other		Total	
Club	Season	Division	Apps	Goals	Apps	Goals	Apps	Goals	Apps	Goals	Apps	Goals
Boca Juniors	2006–07	Argentine Primera División	14	0	—		14 (Note: Appearances in Copa Libertadores)	0	—		28	0
Boca Juniors	2007–08	Argentine Primera División	14	0	—		—		2 (Note: Appearances in FIFA Club World Cup)	0	16	0
Boca Juniors	Total		28	0	—		14	0	2	0	44	0
Valencia	2007–08	La Liga	12	0	2	0	0	0	—		14	0
Valencia	2009–10	La Liga	36	2	2	0	9 (Note: Appearances in UEFA Europa League)	0	—		47	2
Valencia	2010–11	La Liga	28	2	2	1	4 (Note: Appearances in UEFA Champions League)	0	—		34	3
Valencia	2011–12	La Liga	13	0	8	1	4	0	—		25	1
Valencia	2012–13	La Liga	29	4	6	0	5	0	—		40	4
Valencia	2013–14	La Liga	18	1	0	0	1	0	—		19	1
Valencia	Total		136	9	20	2	23	0	—		179	11
Atlético Madrid (loan)	2008–09	La Liga	24	1	4	0	3	0	—		31	1
Newell's Old Boys (loan)	2013–14	Argentine Primera División	14	1	0	0	6	0	—		20	1
Sevilla	2014–15	La Liga	34	3	3	0	12	0	0	0	49	3
Sevilla	2015–16	La Liga	25	5	6	1	13 (Note: Five appearances and two goals in UEFA Champions League, eight appearances in UEFA Europa League)	2	1 (Note: Appearance in UEFA Super Cup)	1	45	9
Sevilla	Total		59	8	9	1	25	2	1	1	94	12
Inter Milan	2016–17	Serie A	28	6	1	0	4	0	—		33	6
Sevilla	2017–18	La Liga	31	3	8	1	11	1	—		50	5
Sevilla	2018–19	La Liga	32	3	5	0	13	5	1 (Note: Appearance in Supercopa de España)	0	51	8
Sevilla	2019–20	La Liga	33	3	3	0	7	0	—		43	3
Sevilla	Total		96	9	16	1	31	6	1	0	144	16
Sevilla	Sevilla total		155	17	25	2	56	8	2	1	238	28
Al Shabab	2020–21	Saudi Pro League	27	7	1	0	—		2 (Note: Appearances in Arab Club Champions Cup)	0	30	7
Al Shabab	2021–22	Saudi Pro League	27	6	3	1	4 (Note: Appearances in AFC Champions League)	2	—		34	9
Al Shabab	2022–23	Saudi Pro League	24	3	1	0	2	1	3	1	30	5
Al Shabab	2023–24	Saudi Pro League	16	2	3	0	—		5	2	24	4
Al Shabab	Total		94	18	8	1	6	3	10	3	118	25
Newell's Old Boys	2024	Argentine Primera División	30	2	1	0	—		—		31	2
Newell's Old Boys	2025	Argentine Primera División	29	3	4	0	—		—		33	3
Newell's Old Boys	Total		59	5	5	0	—		—		64	5
Defensa y Justicia	2026	Argentine Primera División	10	0	1	0	—		—		11	0
Career total			548	57	64	5	112	11	14	4	738	77

=== International ===
Appearances and goals by national team and year
National team	Year	Apps	Goals
Argentina	2008	2	0
Argentina	2009	0	0
Argentina	2010	3	0
Argentina	2011	9	0
Argentina	2012	0	0
Argentina	2013	10	2
Argentina	2014	2	1
Argentina	2015	12	0
Argentina	2016	13	1
Argentina	2017	8	1
Argentina	2018	6	1
Total		65	6

Scores and results list Argentina's goal tally first, score column indicates score after each Banega goal.

International goals by date, venue, cap, opponent, score, result and competition
No.	Date	Venue	Cap	Opponent	Score	Result	Competition
1	26 March 2013	Hernando Siles, La Paz, Bolivia	17	Bolivia	1–1	1–1	2014 FIFA World Cup qualification
2	14 August 2013	Stadio Olimpico, Rome, Italy	20	Italy	2–0	2–1	Friendly
3	14 October 2014	Hong Kong Stadium, So Kon Po, Hong Kong	25	Hong Kong	1–0	7–0	Friendly
4	7 June 2016	Levi's Stadium, Santa Clara, United States	42	Chile	2–0	2–1	Copa América Centenario
5	14 November 2017	Krasnodar Stadium, Krasnodar, Russia	59	Nigeria	1–0	2–4	Friendly
6	23 March 2018	City of Manchester Stadium, Manchester, England	60	Italy	1–0	2–0	Friendly

== Honours ==
Boca Juniors

- Copa Libertadores: 2007

Valencia

- Copa del Rey: 2007–08

Sevilla

- UEFA Europa League: 2014–15, 2015–16, 2019–20
- Copa del Rey runner-up: 2015–16, 2017–18

Argentina U20

- FIFA U-20 World Cup: 2007

Argentina U23

- Summer Olympic Games: 2008

Argentina

- Copa América runner-up: 2015, 2016

Individual

- UEFA Europa League Squad of the Season: 2014–15, 2015–16, 2019–20
- Saudi Pro League Player of the Month: October 2020, February 2021
