= Moteb Al-Harbi =

Saudi Arabian footballer

Personal information
- Full name: Moteb Saad Al-Harbi
- Date of birth: 20 February 2000 (age 26)
- Place of birth: Riyadh, Saudi Arabia
- Height: 1.72 m (5 ft 8 in)
- Position: Left back

Team information
- Current team: Al-Hilal
- Number: 24

Youth career
- 2011-2020: Al-Shabab

Senior career*
Years	Team	Apps	(Gls)
2020–2024	Al-Shabab	102	(3)
2024–	Al-Hilal	62	(2)

International career^{‡}
2018–2020	Saudi Arabia U20		
2021–2022	Saudi Arabia U23		
2021–	Saudi Arabia	23	(0)
- * Club domestic league appearances and goals as of 23 October 2026 ‡ National team caps and goals as of 17 November 2026

Moteb Saad Al-Harbi (Arabic: متعب سعد الحربي; born 20 February 2000) is a Saudi Arabian professional footballer who plays as a left back for the Saudi Arabia national team and for Al-Hilal.

== Club Career ==
Al-Harbi started his career at the youth team of Al-Shabab and represented the club at every level. On 2 March 2020, he signed his first professional contract with Al-Shabab. On 1 September 2024, Al-Harbi joined Al-Hilal on a five-year contract.

== International Career ==
On 31 May 2026, he was named in the 26-man squad for the 2026 FIFA World Cup.

== Honours ==
=== International ===
Saudi Arabia U23

- AFC U-23 Asian Cup: 2022

=== Individual ===
- Saudi Professional League Young Player of the Month: August 2021, October 2021, November 2021, January 2022, January 2023
