= Hussain Al-Sibyani =

Saudi Arabian footballer (born 2001)

Personal information
- Full name: Hussain Khaled Ali Al-Sibyani
- Date of birth: 24 June 2001 (age 25)
- Place of birth: Saudi Arabia
- Height: 1.68 m (5 ft 6 in)
- Position: Left back

Team information
- Current team: Al-Shabab
- Number: 16

Youth career
- Al-Shabab

Senior career*
Years	Team	Apps	(Gls)
2021–	Al-Shabab	54	(2)

International career^{‡}
2019–2021	Saudi Arabia U20		
2022–	Saudi Arabia U23		
2023–	Saudi Arabia	1	(0)
- * Club domestic league appearances and goals as of 22 August 2026 ‡ National team caps and goals as of 12 January 2023

Hussain Khaled Ali Al-Sibyani (Arabic: حسين خالد علي الصبياني, born 24 June 2001) is a Saudi Arabian professional footballer who plays as a left back for Pro League side Al-Shabab.

== Career ==
Al-Sibyani started at Al-Shabab's youth team and was promoted to the first team during the 2021–22 season. On 16 October 2021, Al-Sibyani made his professional debut for Al-Shabab against Abha in the Pro League, replacing Hattan Bahebri. On 31 January 2022, Al-Sibyani signed his first professional contract with the club.

== International career ==
In June 2023, he took part in the Maurice Revello Tournament in France with Saudi Arabia.

== Honours ==
=== International ===
Saudi Arabia U23

- WAFF U-23 Championship: 2022
