= Fares Al-Garzae =

Saudi Arabian footballer

Personal information
- Full name: Fares Abdulkareem Al-Garzae
- Date of birth: April 13, 2001 (age 25)
- Place of birth: Unaizah, Saudi Arabia
- Height: 1.84 m (6 ft 0 in)
- Position: Forward

Youth career
- –2020: Al-Najma
- 2020–2021: Al-Shabab

Senior career*
| Years | Team | Apps | (Gls) |
| 2021–2024 | Al-Shabab | 1 | (0) |
| 2023–2024 | → Al-Najma (loan) | 16 | (0) |
- * Club domestic league appearances and goals as of 16 October 2021

Fares Al-Garzae (Arabic: فارس القرزعي; born 13 April 2001) is a Saudi Arabian professional footballer who plays as a forward.

== Club career ==
Al-Garzae started his career at hometown club Al-Najma. On 26 October 2020, Al-Garzae joined Al-Shabab. On 30 January 2021, Al-Garzae was named on the bench for the first time in the league match against Abha. On 16 October 2021, Al-Garzae made his league debut by coming off the bench against Al-Batin. On 10 September 2023, Al-Garzae joined Al-Najma on a one-year loan.
