= Paulinho (footballer, born January 1997) =

Brazilian footballer

Personal information
- Full name: Paulo Lucas Santos Paula
- Date of birth: 8 January 1997 (age 29)
- Place of birth: Rio de Janeiro, Brazil
- Height: 1.73 m (5 ft 8 in)
- Position: Midfielder

Team information
- Current team: Internacional
- Number: 27

Youth career
- 2011–2017: Fluminense

Senior career*
Years	Team	Apps	(Gls)
2017–2019	Sporting CP B	26	(4)
2019–2021	Boavista	55	(2)
2021–2023	Al-Shabab	23	(1)
2022–2023	→ Al-Fayha (loan)	28	(5)
2023–2026	Vasco	52	(2)
2026-	Internacional	13	(0)
- * Club domestic league appearances and goals as of 8 April 2026

Paulo Lucas Santos Paula (born 8 January 1997), better known as Paulinho, is a Brazilian professional footballer who plays as a midfielder for Internacional.

== Professional career ==
Paulinho made his debut with Sporting B in a 4–0 LigaPro win over Santa Clara on 30 September 2017. On 19 July 2019, Paulinho signed a professional contract with Boavista.

On 28 July 2021, Paulinho joined Saudi Arabian club Al-Shabab on a four-year deal, for a reported fee of €1 million. On 30 July 2022, Paulinho joined Al-Fayha on a season-long loan.

On 26 July 2023, Brazilian side Vasco da Gama announced the signing of Paulinho on a contract until December 2025, for a reported fee of €1.2 million.

In April 2024, Paulinho was caught by Operation Lei Seca drones trying to deceive agents and escape a blitz mounted in Barra da Tijuca, the capital of Rio de Janeiro state. Paulinho was fined twice on the same day for trying to use the services of a professional driver hired locally to cross the checkpoint. In the images recorded by the agents, Paulinho appears being approached. Without a driver's license, he is informed that to leave the location with the vehicle, another qualified person would have to drive the car.

== Career statistics ==
As of match played 17 January 2025

Appearances and goals by club, season and competition
Club	Season	League			State league		National cup (Note: Includes Taça de Portugal, King's Cup, Copa do Brasil)		League cup (Note: Includes Taça da Liga)		Continental		Other		Total	
Club	Season	Division	Apps	Goals	Apps	Goals	Apps	Goals	Apps	Goals	Apps	Goals	Apps	Goals	Apps	Goals
Sporting CP B	2017-18	LigaPro	26	4	—		—		—		—		—		26	4
Boavista	2019–20	Primeira Liga	24	0	—		0	0	1	0	—		—		25	0
Boavista	2020–21	Primeira Liga	31	2	—		2	0	0	0	—		—		33	2
Boavista	2021–22	Primeira Liga	0	0	—		0	0	1	0	—		—		1	0
Boavista	Total		55	2	—		2	0	2	0	—		—		59	2
Al Shabab	2021–22	Saudi Pro League	23	1	—		2	0	—		3 (Note: Appearance(s) in AFC Champions League)	1	—		28	2
Al-Fayha (loan)	2022–23	Saudi Pro League	28	5	—		1	0	—		—		2 (Note: Appearance(s) in Saudi Super Cup)	1	31	6
Vasco da Gama	2023	Série A	21	1	0	0	0	0	—		—		—		21	1
Vasco da Gama	2024	Série A	2	0	2 (Note: Appearance(s) in Campeonato Carioca)	0	0	0	—		—		—		4	0
Vasco da Gama	2025	Série A	0	0	1	0	0	0	—		0	0	—		1	0
Vasco da Gama	Total		23	1	3	0	0	0	—		0	0	0	0	26	1
Career total			155	13	3	0	5	0	2	0	3	1	2	1	170	15
