= 2021–22 Al-Ittihad Club season =

Al-Ittihad
2021–22 season
- President: Anmar Al-Hailiy
- Manager: Fábio Carille (until 23 August); Cosmin Contra (from 29 August)
- Stadium: King Abdullah Sports City
- Pro League: 2nd
- King Cup: Semi-finals
- Arab Club Champions Cup: Runners-up
- Top goalscorer: League: Romarinho (20); All: Romarinho (25)
- Highest home attendance: 58,755 (vs. Al-Hilal, 23 May 2022)
- Lowest home attendance: 0 (vs. Al-Nassr, 11 February 2022)
- Average home league attendance: 33,568
Home colours	Away colours	Third colours

The 2021–22 season was Al-Ittihad's 46th consecutive season in the top flight of Saudi football and 94th year in existence as a football club. The club participated in the Pro League, the King Cup, and the Arab Club Champions Cup. The club did not compete in the AFC Champions League after failing to obtain an AFC license.

The season covered the period from 1 July 2021 to 30 June 2022.

== Players ==
=== Squad information ===
As of 1 September 2021

Note: Flags indicate national team as defined under FIFA eligibility rules; some limited exceptions apply. Players may hold more than one non-FIFA nationality.

No.	Pos.	Nation	Player
1	GK	KSA	Rakan Al-Najjar
3	FW	KSA	Abdulrahman Al-Yami
4	DF	KSA	Ziyad Al-Sahafi
5	DF	KSA	Omar Hawsawi
6	MF	KSA	Khaled Al-Samiri
8	MF	KSA	Fahad Al-Muwallad
9	FW	FRA	Youssouf Niakaté
11	MF	KSA	Abdulaziz Al-Bishi
12	GK	KSA	Mohammed Abo Asidah
13	DF	KSA	Muhannad Al-Shanqeeti
14	MF	KSA	Awad Al-Nashri
15	MF	KSA	Omar Al-Jadani
16	MF	KSA	Abdulaziz Al-Jebreen
17	DF	KSA	Abdullah Al-Hafith (on loan from Al-Wehda)
19	MF	BRA	Bruno Henrique

No.	Pos.	Nation	Player
20	MF	MAR	Karim El Ahmadi
21	DF	KSA	Abdulmohsen Fallatah
22	GK	KSA	Saleh Al-Ohaymid
23	DF	KSA	Mohammed Al-Oufi
24	MF	KSA	Abdulrahman Al-Aboud
26	DF	EGY	Ahmed Hegazi
27	DF	KSA	Hamdan Al-Shamrani
29	MF	KSA	Ahmed Bahusayn
32	DF	KSA	Hazim Al-Zahrani
34	GK	BRA	Marcelo Grohe
66	DF	KSA	Saud Abdulhamid
70	FW	KSA	Haroune Camara
77	MF	BRA	Igor Coronado
88	MF	KSA	Abdulellah Al-Malki
90	FW	BRA	Romarinho

=== Out on loan ===
Note: Flags indicate national team as defined under FIFA eligibility rules; some limited exceptions apply. Players may hold more than one non-FIFA nationality.

No.	Pos.	Nation	Player
28	MF	KSA	Essam Al-Muwallad (at Al-Kholood until 30 June 2022)
55	MF	KSA	Saher Al-Suraihi (at Al-Kawkab until 30 June 2022)
98	MF	KSA	Abdulmajeed Al-Zahrani (at Jeddah until 30 June 2022)
—	GK	KSA	Malek Tolah (at Al-Kholood until 30 June 2022)
—	DF	KSA	Aseel Abed (at Melilla until 30 June 2022)

No.	Pos.	Nation	Player
—	MF	KSA	Ali Al-Rie (at Al-Ain until 30 June 2022)
—	MF	KSA	Abdulaziz Al-Dhuwayhi (at Al-Shoulla until 30 June 2022)
—	MF	KSA	Abdulelah Hawsawi (at Jeddah until 30 June 2022)
—	MF	KSA	Mohammed Sawaan (at Al-Kholood until 30 June 2022)
—	FW	KSA	Abdulaziz Al-Aryani (at Al-Batin until 30 June 2022)

== Transfers and loans ==
=== Transfers in ===
Entry date	Position	No.	Player	From club	Fee	Ref.
30 June 2021	DF	30	(Saudi Arabia) Awn Al-Saluli	(Saudi Arabia) Al-Nahda	End of loan	
30 June 2021	DF	–	(Saudi Arabia) Tareq Abdullah	(Saudi Arabia) Damac	End of loan	
30 June 2021	MF	6	(Saudi Arabia) Khaled Al-Samiri	(Saudi Arabia) Al-Faisaly	End of loan	
30 June 2021	MF	28	(Saudi Arabia) Essam Al-Muwallad	(Saudi Arabia) Al-Hazem	End of loan	
30 June 2021	MF	55	(Saudi Arabia) Saher Al-Suraihi	(Saudi Arabia) Jeddah	End of loan	
30 June 2021	MF	98	(Saudi Arabia) Abdulmajeed Al-Zahrani	(Saudi Arabia) Ohod	End of loan	
30 June 2021	MF	–	(Saudi Arabia) Younes Abdulwahed	(Saudi Arabia) Jeddah	End of loan	
30 June 2021	MF	–	(Saudi Arabia) Abdulaziz Al-Dhuwayhi	(Saudi Arabia) Al-Fayha	End of loan	
30 June 2021	MF	–	(Saudi Arabia) Ali Al-Rie	(Saudi Arabia) Jeddah	End of loan	
30 June 2021	FW	–	(Saudi Arabia) Abdulaziz Al-Aryani	(Saudi Arabia) Damac	End of loan	
1 July 2021	DF	26	(Egypt) Ahmed Hegazi	(England) West Bromwich Albion	$590,000	
7 July 2021	MF	77	(Brazil) Igor Coronado	(United Arab Emirates) Sharjah	$12,000,000	
18 July 2021	GK	35	(Saudi Arabia) Osama Al-Mermesh	(Saudi Arabia) Al-Taawoun	Free	
30 August 2021	FW	9	(France) Youssouf Niakaté	(Saudi Arabia) Al-Wehda	Undisclosed	
1 September 2021	GK	22	(Saudi Arabia) Saleh Al-Ohaymid	(Saudi Arabia) Al-Nassr	Free	
2 January 2022	FW	99	(Morocco) Abderrazak Hamdallah	(Saudi Arabia) Al-Nassr	Free	
22 January 2022	DF	33	(Saudi Arabia) Madallah Al-Olayan	(Saudi Arabia) Al-Ittihad	Swap	

=== Loans in ===
Start date	End date	Position	No.	Player	From club	Fee	Ref.
18 August 2021	End of season	DF	17	(Saudi Arabia) Abdullah Al-Hafith	(Saudi Arabia) Al-Wehda	Undisclosed	
31 January 2022	End of season	MF	30	(Portugal) André André	(Portugal) Vitória	Undisclosed	

=== Transfers out ===
Exit date	Position	No.	Player	To club	Fee	Ref.
30 June 2021	DF	28	(Saudi Arabia) Hamad Al Mansour	(Saudi Arabia) Al-Nassr	End of loan	
4 July 2021	DF	–	(Saudi Arabia) Tareq Abdullah	(Saudi Arabia) Al-Taawoun	Free	
24 July 2021	GK	22	(Saudi Arabia) Fawaz Al-Qarni	(Saudi Arabia) Al-Shabab	$1,000,000	
7 August 2021	MF	7	(Saudi Arabia) Abdulmajeed Al-Swat	(Saudi Arabia) Al-Faisaly	$533,000	
9 August 2021	DF	30	(Saudi Arabia) Awn Al-Saluli	(Saudi Arabia) Al-Taawoun	Free	
12 August 2021	MF	–	(Saudi Arabia) Ahmed Sindi	(Saudi Arabia) Afif	Free	
1 September 2021	MF	–	(Saudi Arabia) Aseel Al-Harbi	(Portugal) Portimonense	Free	
18 September 2021	MF	10	(Cape Verde) Garry Rodrigues	(Greece) Olympiacos	Free	
15 October 2021	FW	9	(Serbia) Aleksandar Prijović	(Australia) Western United	Free	
9 January 2022	FW	3	(Saudi Arabia) Abdulrahman Al-Yami	(Saudi Arabia) Damac	Free	
22 January 2022	DF	66	(Saudi Arabia) Saud Abdulhamid	(Saudi Arabia) Al-Hilal	Swap	
22 January 2022	MF	88	(Saudi Arabia) Abdulellah Al-Malki	(Saudi Arabia) Al-Hilal	$2,000,000	
22 January 2022	FW	9	(France) Youssouf Niakaté	(Saudi Arabia) Al-Ettifaq	Free	
14 February 2022	FW	–	(Saudi Arabia) Rayan Idris	(Belgium) Westerlo	Free	

=== Loans out ===
Start date	End date	Position	No.	Player	To club	Fee	Ref.
18 July 2021	31 January 2022	MF	98	(Saudi Arabia) Abdulmajeed Al-Zahrani	(Saudi Arabia) Jeddah	None	
20 July 2021	End of season	DF	–	(Saudi Arabia) Aseel Abed	(Spain) UD Melilla	None	
22 July 2021	End of season	MF	–	(Saudi Arabia) Abdulaziz Al-Dhuwayhi	(Saudi Arabia) Al-Shoulla	None	
22 July 2021	End of season	FW	–	(Saudi Arabia) Abdulaziz Al-Aryani	(Saudi Arabia) Al-Batin	None	
17 August 2021	End of season	MF	55	(Saudi Arabia) Saher Al-Suraihi	(Saudi Arabia) Al-Kawkab	None	
1 September 2021	End of season	GK	22	(Saudi Arabia) Malek Tolah	(Saudi Arabia) Al-Kholood	None	
1 September 2021	End of season	MF	15	(Saudi Arabia) Mohammed Sawaan	(Saudi Arabia) Al-Kholood	None	
1 September 2021	End of season	MF	28	(Saudi Arabia) Essam Al-Muwallad	(Saudi Arabia) Al-Kholood	None	
1 September 2021	End of season	MF	–	(Saudi Arabia) Abdulelah Hawsawi	(Saudi Arabia) Jeddah	None	
6 September 2021	End of season	MF	–	(Saudi Arabia) Ali Al-Rie	(Saudi Arabia) Al-Ain	None	
31 January 2022	End of season	MF	98	(Saudi Arabia) Abdulmajeed Al-Zahrani	(Saudi Arabia) Al-Okhdood	None	

== Pre-season ==
31 July 2021 Friendly	Al-Ittihad (Saudi Arabia)	9–0	(Austria) Gersthofer SV	Austria
11:00 CEST	Camara 4', 26', 32', 54'; Al-Bishi 21', 68' (pen.); Sawaan 37'; Bahusayn 59'; Al-Yami 88'	Report

31 July 2021 Friendly	Al-Ittihad (Saudi Arabia)	3–2	(Austria) Grazer AK	Austria
15:30 CEST	Romarinho 61'; Al-Muwallad 87', 90+2'	Report

4 August 2021 Friendly	Al-Ittihad (Saudi Arabia)	3–0	(Croatia) Varaždin	Bad Waltersdorf, Austria
17:30 CEST	Rodrigues 68'; Romarinho 71'; Coronado 78'	Report		Stadium: Thermenstadion

28 January 2022 Friendly	Al-Ittihad (Saudi Arabia)	1–2	(England) Newcastle United	Jeddah, Saudi Arabia
15:50 GMT	Hamdallah 33', (red card)	Report	Saint-Maximin 9'; Fraser 57'; Clark (red card)	Stadium: Prince Abdullah Al Faisal Stadium

== Competitions ==
=== Overview ===
Competition	Record							
Competition	G	W	D	L	GF	GA	GD	Win %
Pro League	30	20	5	5	62	29	+33	66.67
King Cup	3	2	0	1	5	4	+1	66.67
Arab Club Champions Cup	1	0	1	0	4	4	+0	0.00
Total	34	22	6	6	71	37	+34	64.71

Updated to match played 27 June 2022
Source: Competitions

=== Pro League ===
==== League table ====
Pos	Team	Pld	W	D	L	GF	GA	GD	Pts	Qualification or relegation
1	Al-Hilal (C)	30	20	7	3	63	28	+35	67	Qualification for AFC Champions League group stage (Note: Al-Fayha qualified for the AFC Champions League play-off round as 2021–22 King Cup winners.)
2	Al-Ittihad	30	20	5	5	62	29	+33	65	
3	Al-Nassr	30	19	4	7	58	36	+22	61	
4	Al-Shabab	30	15	10	5	52	36	+16	55	
5	Damac	30	12	8	10	38	44	−6	44	

Source: spl.com
Rules for classification: 1) Points; 2) Head-to-head points; 3) Head-to-head goal difference; 4) Total goal difference; 5) Total goals scored; 6) Fair-play points (Note: Head-to-head record is used only after all the matches between the teams in question have been played).
(C) Champions

==== Results summary ====
Overall								Home						Away					
Pld	W	D	L	GF	GA	GD	Pts	W	D	L	GF	GA	GD	W	D	L	GF	GA	GD
30	20	5	5	62	29	+33	65	11	2	2	31	10	+21	9	3	3	31	19	+12

Last updated: 27 June 2022.
Source: spl.com.sa

==== Results by round ====
Round	1	2	3	4	5	6	7	8	9	10	11	12	13	14	15	16	17	18	19	20	21	22	23	24	25	26	27	28	29	30
Ground	A	H	A	H	A	H	H	A	H	A	H	A	H	H	A	H	A	H	A	H	A	A	H	A	H	A	H	A	A	H
Result	L	W	W	W	W	D	W	D	L	W	W	L	W	W	W	W	W	W	W	W	D	W	W	W	W	D	L	L	W	D
Position	13	6	4	1	1	1	1	1	2	2	1	2	1	1	1	1	1	1	1	1	1	1	1	1	1	1	1	1	2	2

Updated to match(es) played on 27 June 2022. Source: spl.com.sa
A = Away; H = Home; W = Win; D = Draw; L = Loss

==== Matches ====
All times are local, AST (UTC+3).

Win Draw Loss Postponed

11 August 2021 1	Al-Fayha	1–0	Al-Ittihad	Al Majma'ah
19:15	Owusu (yellow card) 21'; Tachtsidis 35'; Al-Safri (yellow card) 43'; Stojković (yellow card) 89'	Report		Stadium: Al Majma'ah Sports City; Attendance: 1,527; Referee: Turki Al-Khudhayr

16 August 2021 2	Al-Ittihad	3–0	Al-Raed	Jeddah
20:50	Al-Muwallad 7' (pen.); Hegazi 15'; Romarinho 42'	Report		Stadium: King Abdullah Sports City; Attendance: 23,199; Referee: Sami Al-Jires

27 August 2021 3	Al-Faisaly	1–2	Al-Ittihad	Al Majma'ah
19:00	Ismael (yellow card) 24', (goal) 41'; Al-Qumayzi (yellow card) 53'; Rossi (yellow card) 58'; Silva (yellow card) 66'; Qassem (yellow card) 68'	Report	Hegazi 3'; Coronado 45+1'; Al-Aboud (yellow card) 50'; Al-Shamrani (yellow card) 66'; Al-Bishi (yellow card) 90'; Abdulhamid (yellow card) 90+3'	Stadium: Al Majma'ah Sports City; Attendance: 1,764; Referee: Faisal Al-Blwi

11 September 2021 4	Al-Ittihad	6–1	Abha	Jeddah
20:35	Abdulhamid (yellow card) 14'; Coronado 21'; Romarinho 40', 80'; Al-Shamrani 44'; El Ahmadi (yellow card) 74'; Al-Muwallad 89'; Camara 90+1'	Report	Bguir 42'	Stadium: King Abdullah Sports City; Attendance: 29,982; Referee: Ahmed Al-Rumaikhani

18 September 2021 5	Al-Nassr	1–3	Al-Ittihad	Riyadh
20:30	Al-Amri (yellow card) 14' (yellow-red card) 88'; S. Al-Ghanam 37'	Report	Al-Aboud 11'; Al-Malki (yellow card) 48'; Coronado 64'; Grohe (yellow card) 69'; Abdulhamid (yellow card) 72'; Al-Shamrani (yellow card) 80'; Henrique 89'	Stadium: Mrsool Park; Attendance: 14,619; Referee: Sandro Schärer (Switzerland)

24 September 2021 6	Al-Ittihad	1–1	Al-Taawoun	Jeddah
20:25	Al-Shamrani (yellow card) 9'; Romarinho 27' (pen.); Al-Malki (yellow card) 57'	Report	Balobaid (yellow card) 5'; Santos (yellow card) 26', (goal) 74'; Abousaban (yellow card) 31'; Al-Bakr (yellow card) 37'; Sandro (yellow card) 49'; Al-Rashidi (yellow card) 90+1'	Stadium: King Abdullah Sports City; Attendance: 34,547; Referee: Sami Al-Jires

1 October 2021 7	Al-Ittihad	2–0	Al-Ahli	Jeddah
20:20	Al-Shamrani (yellow card) 12', (goal) 50'; Abdulhamid (yellow card) 57'; Hegazi 80'; Henrique (yellow card) 83'; Niakaté (yellow card) 90+1'	Report	Alioski (yellow card) 28'; Bradarić (yellow card) 44'; Al-Johani (yellow card) 90+1'	Stadium: Prince Abdullah Al-Faisal Stadium; Attendance: 14,208; Referee: Mohammed Al-Hoaish

17 October 2021 8	Damac	1–1	Al-Ittihad	Abha
18:25	Zelaya 54'; Majrashi (yellow card) 64'; Augusto (yellow card) 83'	Report	Romarinho 23'	Stadium: Prince Sultan bin Abdul Aziz Stadium; Attendance: 14,790; Referee: Turki Al-Khudhayr

22 October 2021 9	Al-Ittihad	0–2	Al-Shabab	Jeddah
20:00	Al-Shamrani (red card) 50'; El Ahmadi (yellow card) 70'; Romarinho (yellow card) 70'; Al-Aboud (yellow card) 72'; Abdulhamid (yellow card) 73'	Report	Ighalo 22', 68'; Sharahili (yellow card) 39'; Banega (yellow card) 48'	Stadium: Prince Abdullah Al-Faisal Stadium; Attendance: 19,558; Referee: Faisal Al-Blwi

28 October 2021 10	Al-Hazem	0–1	Al-Ittihad	Ar Rass
18:05	Abdulelah S. (yellow card) 50'; Rodrigues (yellow card) 71'; Al-Obaid (yellow card) 84'; Al-Harajin (yellow card) 90+4'; Al-Dakheel (yellow card) 90+5'	Report	El Ahmadi (yellow card) 34'; Al-Zahrani (yellow card) 42'; Al-Malki (yellow card) 43'; Al-Bishi 59'; Romarinho (yellow card) 66'	Stadium: Al-Hazem Club Stadium; Attendance: 3,260; Referee: Abdullah Al-Shehri

4 November 2021 11	Al-Ittihad	3–0	Al-Fateh	Jeddah
19:45	Romarinho 35' (pen.), 70'; Coronado 37'; Al-Sahafi (red card) 77'	Report	Saâdane (yellow card) 26' (yellow-red card) 49'; Kanabah (yellow card) 45+3'	Stadium: King Abdullah Sports City; Attendance: 41,395; Referee: Ahmed Al-Rumaikhani

27 November 2021 13	Al-Ittihad	1–0	Al-Tai	Jeddah
19:40	Romarinho 27'; Coronado (yellow card) 90+7'	Report	Al-Harabi (yellow card) 50'; Al-Qahtani (yellow card) 85'; Sayoud (yellow card) 90+1'	Stadium: King Abdullah Sports City; Attendance: 49,206; Referee: Ovidiu Hațegan (Romania)

26 December 2021 14	Al-Ittihad	3–2	Al-Ettifaq	Jeddah
19:45	Coronado (yellow card) 54'; Camara 71', 85'; Al-Aboud (yellow card) 78'; Al-Sahafi 82', (yellow card) 87'; El Ahmadi (yellow card) 90+4'	Report	Al-Sahafi 29' (o.g.); Mahnashi (yellow card) 36'; M'Bolhi (yellow card) 39'; Quaison 41', (yellow card) 57'; Azaro (yellow card) 81'	Stadium: King Abdullah Sports City; Attendance: 32,740; Referee: István Kovács (Romania)

31 December 2021 15	Al-Batin	2–3	Al-Ittihad	Hafar al-Batin
15:10	Maurício 5'; Abreu (yellow card) 28'; Nasser (yellow card) 51'; Rayhi 83', (yellow card) 84'	Report	Maurício 8' (o.g.); Al-Aboud (yellow card) 37'; Naji 72' (o.g.); Camara 90+3'	Stadium: Al-Batin Club Stadium; Attendance: 2,760; Referee: Sami Al-Jires

7 January 2022 16	Al-Ittihad	2–0	Al-Fayha	Jeddah
19:55	Al-Muwallad (yellow card) 6'; Hawsawi 34'; Romarinho 67'	Report	Mandash (yellow card) 72'	Stadium: King Abdullah Sports City; Attendance: 26,191; Referee: Clément Turpin (France)

14 January 2022 17	Al-Raed	1–2	Al-Ittihad	Buraidah
15:35	Eder (yellow card) 56'; Fouzair 90+2'	Report	Al-Shamrani (yellow card) 9'; Hamdallah 21'; Hawsawi (yellow card) 45'; Al-Muwallad (yellow card) 77'; Romarinho 85' (pen.)	Stadium: King Abdullah Sport City Stadium; Attendance: 8,578; Referee: Sultan Sughayyir

21 January 2022 18	Al-Ittihad	1–0	Al-Faisaly	Jeddah
20:10	Romarinho 88'	Report	Ismael (yellow card) 37'; Al-Qumayzi (yellow card) 57'; Al-Amri (yellow card) 90+10'	Stadium: King Abdullah Sports City; Attendance: 26,901; Referee: Rodolpho Toski (Brazil)

6 February 2022 19	Abha	0–4	Al-Ittihad	Abha
16:05	Ifa (yellow card) 34'	Report	Hawsawi (yellow card) 41'; Romarinho 61' (pen.); Hamdallah 79', 90+4' (pen.); Al-Bishi 80'	Stadium: Prince Sultan bin Abdul Aziz Stadium; Attendance: 7,316; Referee: Khaled Al-Teris

11 February 2022 20	Al-Ittihad	3–0	Al-Nassr	Jeddah
20:20	Romarinho 6' (pen.), (yellow card) 61'; Al-Bishi 31'; Al-Muwallad (yellow card) 48'; Hamdallah 68'; Al-Shanqeeti (yellow card) 82'; Al-Nashri (yellow card) 83'	Report	Talisca (red card) 59'	Stadium: King Abdullah Sports City; Attendance: 0 Referee: Jesús Gil Manzano (Spain)

17 February 2022 21	Al-Taawoun	1–1	Al-Ittihad	Buraidah
18:35	Abdullah (yellow card) 37'; Balobaid (yellow card) 46'; Fathi 59'; Medrán (yellow card) 74'; Al-Amri (red card) 90+4'	Report	Hamdallah 2'; André (yellow card) 17'; Al-Sahafi (yellow card) 87'	Stadium: King Abdullah Sport City Stadium; Attendance: 7,201; Referee: Mohammed Al-Hoaish

26 February 2022 22	Al-Ahli	3–4	Al-Ittihad	Jeddah
21:00	Eduardo 45+3', (yellow card) 88'; Hindi 49', (yellow card) 90+1'; Bradarić (yellow card) 50'; Al-Majhad 73'; Kom (yellow card) 78'; Al-Khabrani (yellow card) 90' (yellow-red card) 90+4'; Al-Moasher (yellow card) 90+3'	Report	André (yellow card) 4'; Hamdallah 7', 21', 90+1' (pen.), (yellow card) 81'; Henrique (yellow card) 39'; Romarinho 41'; Al-Aboud (yellow card) 71'; Al-Shanqeeti (yellow card) 90+3'	Stadium: Prince Abdullah Al-Faisal Stadium; Attendance: 11,874; Referee: Sandro Schärer (Switzerland)

3 March 2022 23	Al-Ittihad	2–1	Damac	Jeddah
19:00	Al-Muwallad 75'; Al-Aboud 79', (red card) 90+10'	Report	Chafaï (yellow card) 47'; Al-Nakhli (yellow card) 54'; Soudani (yellow card) 55'; Hamzi (yellow card) 68'; Zelaya 90+3' (pen.); Abu Shararah (red card) 90+10'; Hawsawi (yellow card) 90+14'	Stadium: King Abdullah Sports City; Attendance: 27,372; Referee: Bastian Dankert (Germany)

8 March 2021 12	Al-Hilal	2–1	Al-Ittihad	Riyadh
20:45	S. Al-Dawsari 16' (pen.); Cuéllar (yellow card) 32'; Jang Hyun-soo (yellow card) 52'; Ighalo 68'	Report	Camara 59'	Stadium: Prince Faisal bin Fahd Stadium; Attendance: 16,472; Referee: Raphael Claus (Brazil)

13 March 2022 24	Al-Shabab	0–2	Al-Ittihad	Riyadh
20:45	Bahebri (yellow card) 35'; Paulinho (yellow card) 38'; Banega (yellow card) 85'	Report	Al-Sahafi (yellow card) 15'; Al-Muwallad (yellow card) 18'; Al-Hafith (yellow card) 21'; Al-Bishi 45'; Romarinho 50'; André (yellow card) 77'	Stadium: Prince Faisal bin Fahd Stadium; Attendance: 11,234; Referee: Anastasios Sidiropoulos (Greece)

18 March 2022 25	Al-Ittihad	3–0	Al-Hazem	Jeddah
19:05	Al-Aboud (yellow card) 42'; Al-Hafith (yellow card) 44'; Al-Shanqeeti 66'; Hamdallah 86', 90+6'	Report	Abdulelah S. (yellow card) 18'; Al-Khalaf (yellow card) 64'; Neris (yellow card) 90+3'	Stadium: King Abdullah Sports City; Attendance: 52,329; Referee: Andrés Cunha (Uruguay)

6 May 2022 26	Al-Fateh	4–4	Al-Ittihad	Al-Hasa
18:50	Petros 9'; Al-Buraikan 45+3', 83'; Bendebka 60'; Batna (yellow card) 76'	Report	Romarinho 17', 77'; Coronado 20'; Hawsawi (yellow card) 29'; Hamdallah 42'; Al-Shamrani (yellow card) 90+7'	Stadium: Prince Abdullah bin Jalawi Stadium; Attendance: 16,754; Referee: Sami Al-Jires

23 May 2022 27	Al-Ittihad	1–3	Al-Hilal	Jeddah
21:00	Romarinho 32' (pen.), (yellow card) 45+11'; Al-Bishi (yellow card) 57'	Report	Hyun-soo (yellow card) 29'; Michael 42', 69'; S. Al-Dawsari 66'	Stadium: King Abdullah Sports City; Attendance: 58,755; Referee: Mohammed Al-Hoaish

29 May 2022 28	Al-Tai	1–0	Al-Ittihad	Ha'il
21:00	Sayoud 51'; Dener (yellow card) 60'; Al-Harabi (yellow card) 67'; Majrashi (yellow card) 70'; Malele (yellow card) 90'	Report		Stadium: Prince Abdul Aziz bin Musa'ed Stadium; Attendance: 7,696; Referee: Szymon Marciniak (Poland)

23 June 2022 29	Al-Ettifaq	1–3	Al-Ittihad	Dammam
21:00	Abdellaoui (yellow card) 50'; Younes 58'; Kiss (red card) 90+6'	Report	Romarinho 73' (pen.), 74'; André (yellow card) 78'; Al-Nashri (yellow card) 82'; Hamdallah 87'	Stadium: Prince Mohamed bin Fahd Stadium; Attendance: 13,172; Referee: César Arturo Ramos (Mexico)

27 June 2022 30	Al-Ittihad	0–0	Al-Batin	Jeddah
21:00	Henrique (yellow card) 71'	Report	Chaves (yellow card) 36'; Al-Eisa (yellow card) 40'; Al-Shamlan (yellow card) 45+6'; Abreu (yellow card) 74'; Al-Hurayji (yellow card) 90+2'	Stadium: King Abdullah Sports City; Attendance: 29,900; Referee: Carlos del Cerro Grande (Spain)

=== King Cup ===
All times are local, AST (UTC+3).

20 December 2021 Round of 16	Al-Fateh	2–3	Al-Ittihad	Al-Hasa
17:35	Al-Daheem (yellow card) 9'; Batna 17', 22', (yellow card) 90+7'; Lajami (yellow card) 39'; Santini (yellow card) 45+3'; Cueva (yellow card) 56' (yellow-red card) 90+4'; Kanabah (yellow card) 78'; Al-Fuhaid (yellow card) 90+4'	Report	Al-Aboud (yellow card) 13'; Romarinho 37' (pen.), 75'; Al-Shamrani (yellow card) 89'; Al-Sahafi (yellow card) 90+2'; Bruno Henrique 90+2'	Stadium: Prince Abdullah bin Jalawi Stadium; Referee: Khaled Salwi

21 February 2022 Quarter-finals	Al-Taawoun	1–2	Al-Ittihad	Buraidah
16:00	Abdullah (yellow card) 30'; Al-Nabit 53'; El Mahdioui (yellow card) 90+6'	Report	Al-Bishi 86'; Henrique (yellow card) 90+6'; Hamdallah 90+6' (pen.); André (yellow card) 90+9'	Stadium: King Abdullah Sport City Stadium; Referee: Nikola Dabanović (Montenegro)

4 April 2022 Semi-finals	Al-Fayha	1–0	Al-Ittihad	Al Majma'ah
22:00	Abousaban 36'	Report		Stadium: Al Majma'ah Sports City; Referee: Slavko Vinčić (Slovenia)

=== Arab Club Champions Cup ===
==== Final ====
21 August 2021 Final	Al-Ittihad (Saudi Arabia)	4–4 (3–4 p)	(Morocco) Raja Casablanca	Rabat, Morocco
21:00 WAT	Henrique 4'; Romarinho 28' (pen.), 53', 64' (pen.); Abdulhamid (yellow card) 41'; Hawsawi (yellow card) 49'; El Ahmadi (yellow card) 66'	Report	Haddad 5', (yellow card) 85'; Benhalib 13'; Hafidi (yellow card) 18'; Zniti (yellow card) 27'; El Wardi 37', (yellow card) 55'; Rahimi 50', (yellow card) 51'	Stadium: Prince Moulay Abdellah Stadium; Referee: Mahmoud El Banna (Egypt)
	Penalties
	Henrique (penalty missed); Romarinho (penalty scored); Coronado (penalty scored); Al-Muwallad (penalty missed); Al-Malki (penalty scored)		(penalty scored) Rahimi; (penalty scored) Zrida; (penalty missed) Madkour; (penalty scored) Hafidi; (penalty scored) Arjoune

== Statistics ==
=== Appearances ===
Last updated on 27 June 2022.

No.	Pos	Nat	Player	Total		Pro League		King Cup		Arab Club Champions Cup	
No.	Pos	Nat	Player	Apps	Goals	Apps	Goals	Apps	Goals	Apps	Goals
Goalkeepers
1	GK	(Saudi Arabia) KSA	Rakan Al-Najjar	3	0	2+1	0	0	0	0	0
12	GK	(Saudi Arabia) KSA	Mohammed Abo Asidah	0	0	0	0	0	0	0	0
22	GK	(Saudi Arabia) KSA	Saleh Al-Ohaymid	0	0	0	0	0	0	0	0
34	GK	(Brazil) BRA	Marcelo Grohe	32	0	28	0	3	0	1	0
Defenders
4	DF	(Saudi Arabia) KSA	Ziyad Al-Sahafi	21	1	16+2	1	3	0	0	0
5	DF	(Saudi Arabia) KSA	Omar Hawsawi	18	1	13+3	1	1	0	1	0
13	DF	(Saudi Arabia) KSA	Muhannad Al-Shanqeeti	30	1	24+4	1	1	0	1	0
17	DF	(Saudi Arabia) KSA	Abdullah Al-Hafith	10	0	5+3	0	1+1	0	0	0
21	DF	(Saudi Arabia) KSA	Abdulmohsen Fallatah	0	0	0	0	0	0	0	0
26	DF	(Egypt) EGY	Ahmed Hegazi	19	3	18	3	1	0	0	0
27	DF	(Saudi Arabia) KSA	Hamdan Al-Shamrani	32	2	28	2	2+1	0	1	0
32	DF	(Saudi Arabia) KSA	Hazim Al-Zahrani	5	0	2+3	0	0	0	0	0
33	DF	(Saudi Arabia) KSA	Madallah Al-Olayan	9	0	2+5	0	2	0	0	0
Midfielders
6	MF	(Saudi Arabia) KSA	Khaled Al-Samiri	5	0	1+4	0	0	0	0	0
8	MF	(Saudi Arabia) KSA	Fahad Al-Muwallad	24	3	13+8	3	1+1	0	1	0
11	MF	(Saudi Arabia) KSA	Abdulaziz Al-Bishi	31	5	24+3	4	2+1	1	1	0
14	MF	(Saudi Arabia) KSA	Awad Al-Nashri	12	0	2+10	0	0	0	0	0
16	MF	(Saudi Arabia) KSA	Abdulaziz Al-Jebreen	4	0	0+4	0	0	0	0	0
19	MF	(Brazil) BRA	Bruno Henrique	34	3	20+10	1	2+1	1	1	1
24	MF	(Saudi Arabia) KSA	Abdulrahman Al-Aboud	30	2	20+6	2	3	0	0+1	0
28	MF	(Saudi Arabia) KSA	Omar Al-Jadani	0	0	0	0	0	0	0	0
29	MF	(Saudi Arabia) KSA	Ahmed Bahusayn	5	0	0+5	0	0	0	0	0
30	MF	(Portugal) POR	André André	14	0	12	0	2	0	0	0
77	MF	(Brazil) BRA	Igor Coronado	22	5	15+4	5	1+1	0	1	0
Forwards
70	FW	(Saudi Arabia) KSA	Haroune Camara	24	5	6+16	5	1+1	0	0	0
90	FW	(Brazil) BRA	Romarinho	33	25	29	20	2+1	2	1	3
99	FW	(Morocco) MAR	Abderrazak Hamdallah	15	13	11+2	12	2	1	0	0
Player who made an appearance this season but have left the club
3	FW	(Saudi Arabia) KSA	Abdulrahman Al-Yami	2	0	0+2	0	0	0	0	0
9	FW	(France) FRA	Youssouf Niakaté	9	0	2+6	0	1	0	0	0
10	MF	(Cape Verde) CPV	Garry Rodrigues	2	0	2	0	0	0	0	0
20	MF	(Morocco) MAR	Karim El Ahmadi	18	0	16	0	1	0	1	0
66	DF	(Saudi Arabia) KSA	Saud Abdulhamid	9	0	8	0	0	0	1	0
88	MF	(Saudi Arabia) KSA	Abdulellah Al-Malki	16	0	11+3	0	1	0	0+1	0

=== Goalscorers ===
Rank	No.	Pos	Nat	Name	Pro League	King Cup	Arab Club Champions Cup	Total
1	90	FW	(Brazil)	Romarinho	20	2	3	25
2	99	FW	(Morocco)	Abderrazak Hamdallah	12	1	0	13
3	11	MF	(Saudi Arabia)	Abdulaziz Al-Bishi	4	1	0	5
3	70	FW	(Saudi Arabia)	Haroune Camara	5	0	0	5
3	77	MF	(Brazil)	Igor Coronado	5	0	0	5
6	8	MF	(Saudi Arabia)	Fahad Al-Muwallad	3	0	0	3
6	19	MF	(Brazil)	Bruno Henrique	1	1	1	3
6	26	DF	(Egypt)	Ahmed Hegazi	3	0	0	3
9	24	MF	(Saudi Arabia)	Abdulrahman Al-Aboud	2	0	0	2
9	27	DF	(Saudi Arabia)	Hamdan Al-Shamrani	2	0	0	2
11	4	DF	(Saudi Arabia)	Ziyad Al-Sahafi	1	0	0	1
11	5	DF	(Saudi Arabia)	Omar Hawsawi	1	0	0	1
11	13	DF	(Saudi Arabia)	Muhannad Al-Shanqeeti	1	0	0	1
Own goal					2	0	0	0
Total					62	5	4	71

Last Updated: 23 June 2022

=== Assists ===
Rank	No.	Pos	Nat	Name	Pro League	King Cup	Arab Club Champions Cup	Total
1	77	MF	(Brazil)	Igor Coronado	10	0	1	11
2	90	FW	(Brazil)	Romarinho	6	1	0	7
3	19	MF	(Brazil)	Bruno Henrique	6	0	0	6
4	24	MF	(Saudi Arabia)	Abdulrahman Al-Aboud	4	1	0	5
5	27	DF	(Saudi Arabia)	Hamdan Al-Shamrani	4	0	0	4
6	13	DF	(Saudi Arabia)	Muhannad Al-Shanqeeti	3	0	0	3
7	8	MF	(Saudi Arabia)	Fahad Al-Muwallad	2	0	0	2
7	11	MF	(Saudi Arabia)	Abdulaziz Al-Bishi	2	0	0	2
9	3	FW	(Saudi Arabia)	Abdulrahman Al-Yami	1	0	0	1
9	9	FW	(France)	Youssouf Niakaté	1	0	0	1
9	10	MF	(Cape Verde)	Garry Rodrigues	1	0	0	1
9	30	MF	(Portugal)	André André	1	0	0	1
9	33	DF	(Saudi Arabia)	Madallah Al-Olayan	1	0	0	1
9	66	DF	(Saudi Arabia)	Saud Abdulhamid	0	0	1	1
9	88	MF	(Saudi Arabia)	Abdulellah Al-Malki	1	0	0	1
9	99	FW	(Morocco)	Abderrazak Hamdallah	1	0	0	1
Total					44	2	2	48

Last Updated: 23 June 2022

=== Clean sheets ===
Rank	No.	Pos	Nat	Name	Pro League	King Cup	Arab Club Champions Cup	Total
1	34	GK	(Brazil)	Marcelo Grohe	12	0	0	12
Total					12	0	0	12

Last Updated: 27 June 2022
