= 2020–21 Al-Ittihad Club season =

Al-Ittihad
2020–21 season
- President: Anmar Al-Hailiy
- Manager: Fábio Carille
- Stadium: King Abdullah Sports City
- Pro League: 3rd
- King Cup: Quarter-finals
- Arab Club Champions Cup: Runners-up
- Top goalscorer: League: Romarinho (16); All: Romarinho (18)
Home colours	Away colours

The 2020–21 season was Al-Ittihad's 45th consecutive season in the top flight of Saudi football and 94th year in existence as a football club. The club participated in the Pro League, the King Cup and the Arab Club Champions Cup.

The season covered the period from 22 September 2020 to 30 June 2021.

== Players ==
=== Squad information ===
As of 12 February 2021

Note: Flags indicate national team as defined under FIFA eligibility rules; some limited exceptions apply. Players may hold more than one non-FIFA nationality.

No.	Pos.	Nation	Player
1	GK	(Saudi Arabia) KSA	Rakan Al-Najjar
3	FW	(Saudi Arabia) KSA	Abdulrahman Al-Yami
4	DF	(Saudi Arabia) KSA	Ziyad Al-Sahafi
5	DF	(Saudi Arabia) KSA	Omar Hawsawi
7	MF	(Saudi Arabia) KSA	Abdulmajeed Al-Swat
8	MF	(Saudi Arabia) KSA	Fahad Al-Muwallad
9	FW	(Serbia) SRB	Aleksandar Prijović
10	MF	(Cape Verde) CPV	Garry Rodrigues
11	MF	(Saudi Arabia) KSA	Abdulaziz Al-Bishi
12	GK	(Saudi Arabia) KSA	Mohammed Abo Asidah
13	DF	(Saudi Arabia) KSA	Muhannad Al-Shanqeeti
14	MF	(Saudi Arabia) KSA	Awad Al-Nashri
16	MF	(Saudi Arabia) KSA	Abdulaziz Al-Jebreen
17	DF	(Mali) MLI	Ahmed Emad Eldin
19	MF	(Brazil) BRA	Bruno Henrique
20	MF	(Morocco) MAR	Karim El Ahmadi

No.	Pos.	Nation	Player
21	DF	(Saudi Arabia) KSA	Abdulmohsen Fallatah
22	GK	(Saudi Arabia) KSA	Fawaz Al-Qarni
23	DF	(Saudi Arabia) KSA	Mohammed Al-Oufi
24	MF	(Saudi Arabia) KSA	Abdulrahman Al-Aboud
25	DF	(Saudi Arabia) KSA	Hassan Al-Asmari
26	DF	(Egypt) EGY	Ahmed Hegazi (on loan from West Bromwich Albion)
27	DF	(Saudi Arabia) KSA	Hamdan Al-Shamrani
28	DF	(Saudi Arabia) KSA	Hamad Al Mansor (on loan from Al-Nassr)
29	MF	(Saudi Arabia) KSA	Ahmed Bahusayn
34	GK	(Brazil) BRA	Marcelo Grohe
66	DF	(Saudi Arabia) KSA	Saud Abdulhamid
70	FW	(Saudi Arabia) KSA	Haroune Camara
76	DF	(Saudi Arabia) KSA	Hazim Al-Zahrani
88	MF	(Saudi Arabia) KSA	Abdulellah Al-Malki
90	FW	(Brazil) BRA	Romarinho

=== Out on loan ===
Note: Flags indicate national team as defined under FIFA eligibility rules; some limited exceptions apply. Players may hold more than one non-FIFA nationality.

No.	Pos.	Nation	Player
6	MF	(Saudi Arabia) KSA	Khaled Al-Samiri (at Al-Faisaly until 30 June 2021)
26	FW	(Saudi Arabia) KSA	Abdulaziz Al-Aryani (at Damac until 30 June 2021)
28	MF	(Saudi Arabia) KSA	Essam Al-Muwallad (at Al-Hazem until 30 June 2021)
30	DF	(Saudi Arabia) KSA	Awn Al-Saluli (at Al-Nahda until 30 June 2021)
35	MF	(Ivory Coast) CIV	Sékou Sanogo (at Red Star Belgrade until 1 January 2021)
55	MF	(Saudi Arabia) KSA	Saher Al-Suraihi (at Jeddah until 30 June 2021)

No.	Pos.	Nation	Player
83	MF	(Argentina) ARG	Leonardo Gil (at Vasco da Gama until 30 June 2021)
98	MF	(Saudi Arabia) KSA	Abdulmajeed Al-Zahrani (at Ohod until 30 June 2021)
—	DF	(Saudi Arabia) KSA	Tareq Abdullah (at Damac until 30 June 2021)
—	MF	(Saudi Arabia) KSA	Younes Abdulwahed (at Jeddah until 30 June 2021)
—	MF	(Saudi Arabia) KSA	Abdulaziz Al-Dhuwayhi (at Al-Fayha until 30 June 2021)
—	MF	(Saudi Arabia) KSA	Ali Al-Rie (at Jeddah until 30 June 2021)

== Transfers and loans ==
=== Transfers in ===
Entry date	Position	No.	Player	From club	Fee	Ref.
22 September 2020	DF	30	(Saudi Arabia) Awn Al-Saluli	(Saudi Arabia) Al-Fayha	End of loan	
22 September 2020	MF	28	(Saudi Arabia) Essam Al-Muwallad	(Saudi Arabia) Al-Bukayriyah	End of loan	
22 September 2020	MF	55	(Saudi Arabia) Saher Al-Suraihi	(Saudi Arabia) Al-Thoqbah	End of loan	
22 September 2020	FW	45	(Serbia) Aleksandar Pešić	(South Korea) FC Seoul	End of loan	
23 September 2020	FW	3	(Saudi Arabia) Abdulrahman Al-Yami	(Saudi Arabia) Al-Hazem	Undisclosed	
27 September 2020	MF	7	(Saudi Arabia) Abdulmajeed Al-Swat	(Saudi Arabia) Al-Taawoun	Free	
12 October 2020	MF	19	(Brazil) Bruno Henrique	(Brazil) Palmeiras	$5,000,000	
18 October 2020	DF	5	(Saudi Arabia) Omar Hawsawi	(Saudi Arabia) Al-Nassr	Free	
19 October 2020	MF	10	(Cape Verde) Garry Rodrigues	(Turkey) Fenerbahçe	End of loan	
21 October 2020	MF	16	(Saudi Arabia) Abdulaziz Al-Jebreen	(Saudi Arabia) Al-Nassr	Free	

=== Loans in ===
Start date	End date	Position	No.	Player	From club	Fee	Ref.
22 October 2020	End of season	DF	28	(Saudi Arabia) Hamad Al Mansor	(Saudi Arabia) Al-Nassr	None	
25 October 2020	End of season	DF	26	(Egypt) Ahmed Hegazi	(England) West Bromwich Albion	$587,400	

=== Transfers out ===
Exit date	Position	No.	Player	To club	Fee	Ref.
22 September 2020	GK	12	(Saudi Arabia) Assaf Al-Qarni		Released	
22 September 2020	GK	28	(Saudi Arabia) Amin Al Bukhari	(Saudi Arabia) Al-Nassr	Free	
22 September 2020	MF	99	(Saudi Arabia) Mohammed Al-Thani	(Saudi Arabia) Al-Faisaly	End of loan	
22 September 2020	MF	–	(Saudi Arabia) Hamad Al-Ghamdi	(Saudi Arabia) Al-Shabab	$186,000	
27 September 2020	DF	2	(Saudi Arabia) Abdullah Al-Ammar	(Saudi Arabia) Damac	Free	
30 September 2020	DF	24	(Saudi Arabia) Ammar Al-Daheem	(Saudi Arabia) Al-Fateh	Free	
4 October 2020	FW	45	(Serbia) Aleksandar Pešić	(Israel) Maccabi Tel Aviv	Free	
9 October 2020	FW	49	(Saudi Arabia) Abdulrahman Al-Ghamdi	(Saudi Arabia) Al-Raed	Free	
1 November 2020	FW	80	(Ivory Coast) Wilfried Bony		Released	
6 January 2021	DF	31	(Saudi Arabia) Mansoor Al-Harbi	(Saudi Arabia) Al-Raed	Free	

=== Loans out ===
Start date	End date	Position	No.	Player	To club	Fee	Ref.
27 September 2020	End of season	MF	14	(Saudi Arabia) Younes Abdulwahed	(Saudi Arabia) Jeddah	None	
27 September 2020	End of season	FW	26	(Saudi Arabia) Abdulaziz Al-Aryani	(Saudi Arabia) Damac	None	
9 October 2020	End of season	MF	28	(Saudi Arabia) Essam Al-Muwallad	(Saudi Arabia) Al-Hazem	None	
10 October 2020	End of season	MF	83	(Argentina) Leonardo Gil	(Brazil) Vasco da Gama	None	
11 October 2020	End of season	MF	16	(Saudi Arabia) Ali Al-Rie	(Saudi Arabia) Jeddah	None	
11 October 2020	End of season	MF	55	(Saudi Arabia) Saher Al-Suraihi	(Saudi Arabia) Jeddah	None	
14 October 2020	End of season	DF	3	(Saudi Arabia) Tareq Abdullah	(Saudi Arabia) Damac	None	
16 January 2021	End of season	MF	–	(Saudi Arabia) Abdulaziz Al-Dhuwayhi	(Saudi Arabia) Al-Fayha	None	
27 January 2021	End of season	MF	6	(Saudi Arabia) Khaled Al-Sumairi	(Saudi Arabia) Al-Faisaly	None	
29 January 2021	End of season	MF	98	(Saudi Arabia) Abdulmajeed Al-Zahrani	(Saudi Arabia) Ohod	None	
12 February 2021	End of season	DF	30	(Saudi Arabia) Awn Al-Saluli	(Saudi Arabia) Al-Nahda	None	

== Pre-season ==
1 October 2020 Friendly	Al-Ittihad (Saudi Arabia)	2–2	(Saudi Arabia) Al-Faisaly	Jeddah, Saudi Arabia
17:00 AST	Al-Muwallad 33' (pen.); Romarinho 37'	Report	Tavares 51'; Omar 78'	Stadium: Al-Ittihad Club Stadium

7 October 2020 Friendly	Al-Ittihad (Saudi Arabia)	2–0	(Saudi Arabia) Jeddah	Jeddah, Saudi Arabia
17:00 AST	Al-Bishi 25'; Gil 89'	Report		Stadium: Al-Ittihad Club Stadium

10 October 2020 Friendly	Al-Ittihad (Saudi Arabia)	3–3	(Saudi Arabia) Damac	Jeddah, Saudi Arabia
17:30 AST	Al-Muwallad 26'; Romarinho 62'; Al-Sumairi 83'	Report	Zelaya 19', 53'; Al-Hujaili 47'	Stadium: Al-Ittihad Club Stadium

15 October 2020 Friendly	Al-Ittihad (Saudi Arabia)	2–0	(Saudi Arabia) Al-Akhdoud	Jeddah, Saudi Arabia
19:00 AST	Al-Yami 44'; Prijović 63'	Report		Stadium: Al-Ittihad Club Stadium

== Competitions ==
=== Overview ===
Competition	Record							
Competition	G	W	D	L	GF	GA	GD	Win %
Pro League	30	15	11	4	45	29	+16	50.00
King Cup	2	1	0	1	4	2	+2	50.00
Arab Club Champions Cup	2	1	1	0	4	3	+1	50.00
Total	34	17	12	5	53	34	+19	50.00

Updated to match played 30 May 2021
Source: Competitions

=== Pro League ===
==== League table ====
Pos	Team	Pld	W	D	L	GF	GA	GD	Pts	Qualification or relegation
1	Al-Hilal (C)	30	18	7	5	60	27	+33	61	Qualification for AFC Champions League group stage
2	Al-Shabab	30	17	6	7	68	43	+25	57	Qualification for AFC Champions League group stage
3	Al-Ittihad (Note: Al-Ittihad cannot qualify for Asian Football Confederation competitions as they did not obtain an AFC license.)	30	15	11	4	45	29	+16	56	
4	Al-Taawoun	30	13	8	9	42	30	+12	47 (Note: Positions determined by head-to-head points: Al-Taawoun 4 pts; Al-Ettifaq 1 pt.)	Qualification for AFC Champions League play-off round
5	Al-Ettifaq	30	14	5	11	50	48	+2	47	

Source: spl.com source=إحصائيات رابطة دوري المحترفين السعودي 2020-2021
Rules for classification: 1) Points; 2) Head-to-head points; 3) Head-to-head goal difference; 4) Total goal difference; 5) Total goals scored; 6) Fair-play points (Note: Head-to-head record is used only after all the matches between the teams in question have been played).
(C) Champions

==== Results summary ====
Overall								Home						Away					
Pld	W	D	L	GF	GA	GD	Pts	W	D	L	GF	GA	GD	W	D	L	GF	GA	GD
30	15	11	4	45	29	+16	56	8	4	3	21	12	+9	7	7	1	24	17	+7

Last updated: 30 May 2021.
Source: spl.com.sa

==== Results by round ====
Round	1	2	3	4	5	6	7	8	9	10	11	12	13	14	15	16	17	18	19	20	21	22	23	24	25	26	27	28	29	30
Ground	H	A	H	H	A	H	A	A	H	A	A	H	H	A	H	A	H	A	A	H	A	H	H	A	H	H	A	A	H	A
Result	L	D	W	D	D	W	W	D	D	D	W	W	L	W	D	L	W	D	W	L	W	W	W	D	W	D	D	W	W	W
Position	12	11	8	10	10	6	4	4	5	5	4	4	5	4	4	5	4	4	4	4	3	3	3	3	3	3	4	3	3	3

Updated to match(es) played on 30 May 2021. Source: spl.com.sa
A = Away; H = Home; W = Win; D = Draw; L = Loss

==== Matches ====
All times are local, AST (UTC+3).

Win Draw Loss Postponed

18 October 2020 1	Al-Ittihad	1–2	Al-Ettifaq	Jeddah
20:00	Al-Muwallad 60' (pen.); Grohe (yellow card) 79'	Report	Kiss (yellow card) 7', (goal) 80' (pen.), 88' (pen.)	Stadium: King Abdullah Sports City; Attendance: 0 Referee: Turki Al-Khudhayr

24 October 2020 2	Al-Fateh	2–2	Al-Ittihad	Al-Hasa
19:55	Al-Fuhaid (yellow card) 18'; Boushal (yellow card) 25'; Al-Daheem (yellow card) 42' te Vrede 50' (pen.); Batna (yellow card) 60'; Al-Zaqaan 64'	Report	Romarinho 43'; Henrique 90+3'	Stadium: Prince Abdullah bin Jalawi Stadium; Attendance: 0 Referee: Khaled Al-Teris

31 October 2020 3	Al-Ittihad	2–0	Al-Ahli	Jeddah
19:50	Romarinho 8'; Rodrigues 16'	Report	Lima (yellow card) 64'	Stadium: King Abdullah Sports City; Attendance: 0 Referee: Majed Al-Shamrani

6 November 2020 4	Al-Ittihad	1–1	Al-Taawoun	Jeddah
19:45	El Ahmadi (yellow card) 51'; Prijović (yellow card) 51'; Romarinho 59' (pen.)	Report	Al-Jouei (yellow card) 44', (goal) 73'; Duke (yellow card) 45+1'	Stadium: King Abdullah Sports City; Attendance: 0 Referee: Mohammed Al-Qarni

23 November 2020 5	Al-Faisaly	1–1	Al-Ittihad	Al Majma'ah
17:45	Amalfitano (yellow card) 28'; Qassem (yellow card) 30'; Rossi (yellow card) 38'; Guilherme 90+2'	Report	Romarinho 44'; Al-Malki (yellow card) 64'; Al-Swat (yellow card) 85'; Camara (yellow card) 87'	Stadium: Al Majma'ah Sports City; Attendance: 0 Referee: Faisal Al-Blwi

27 November 2020 6	Al-Ittihad	1–0	Al-Qadsiah	Jeddah
19:40	Rodrigues 18'; Hegazi (yellow card) 51'	Report	Al-Amri (yellow card) 40'	Stadium: King Abdullah Sports City; Attendance: 0 Referee: Khaled Al-Teris

6 December 2020 7	Al-Wehda	1–2	Al-Ittihad	Mecca
19:45	Al-Hafith (yellow card) 57'; Kariri (yellow card) 59'; Petratos 90' (pen.)	Report	Rodrigues 28'; Al-Jebreen (yellow card) 80'; Romarinho 84' (pen.)	Stadium: King Abdul Aziz Stadium; Attendance: 0 Referee: Khaled Salwi

11 December 2020 8	Al-Shabab	1–1	Al-Ittihad	Riyadh
19:45	Lichnovsky 57'; Salem (yellow card) 59'; Banega (yellow card) 78'	Report	Prijović 19'; Al-Bishi (yellow card) 51'; Hegazi (yellow card) 59'; Al-Malki (yellow card) 62'; El Ahmadi (yellow card) 76'	Stadium: Prince Khalid bin Sultan Stadium; Attendance: 0 Referee: Mohammed Al-Hoaish

21 December 2020 9	Al-Ittihad	0–0	Al-Raed	Mecca
19:50	Al-Shamrani (yellow card) 30'	Report	Djoum (yellow card) 72'; Nikolić (yellow card) 85'	Stadium: King Abdul Aziz Stadium; Attendance: 0 Referee: Mohammed Al-Qarni

26 December 2020 10	Al-Hilal	1–1	Al-Ittihad	Riyadh
19:50	Al-Shehri 85'	Report	Al-Aboud 20'; Al-Malki (yellow card) 80'; Al-Bishi (yellow card) 82'; Grohe (yellow card) 90+2'	Stadium: King Fahd International Stadium; Attendance: 0 Referee: Mohammed Al-Hoaish

31 December 2020 11	Al-Batin	1–2	Al-Ittihad	Hafar al-Batin
15:10	Chaves (yellow card) 64'; Abreu 90+3'	Report	Al-Malki (yellow card) 33'; Romarinho 54', 81', (yellow card) 78'; Camara (yellow card) 85'; Hawsawi (yellow card) 90+2'	Stadium: Al-Batin Club Stadium; Attendance: 0 Referee: Abdullah Al-Harbi

9 January 2021 12	Al-Ittihad	1–0	Damac	Mecca
19:55	Al-Sahafi (yellow card) 16'; Al-Aboud 36'; El Ahmadi (yellow card) 46'; Al-Muwallad (yellow card) 56'; Al-Swat (yellow card) 90+11'	Report	Saidani (yellow card) 63'; Lema (yellow card) 88'	Stadium: King Abdul Aziz Stadium; Attendance: 0 Referee: Sami Al-Jires

14 January 2021 13	Al-Ittihad	0–1	Abha	Jeddah
20:10	Abdulhamid (red card) 15'; Al-Aboud (yellow card) 71'	Report	Al-Amri (yellow card) 23'; Barnawi (yellow card) 32'; Goodwin (yellow card) 86'; Strandberg 88'	Stadium: King Abdullah Sports City; Attendance: 0 Referee: Faisal Al-Blwi

19 January 2021 14	Al-Ain	1–2	Al-Ittihad	Al Bahah
16:00	Nahiri (yellow card) 33'; Getterson 87'; Moutari (yellow card) 89'	Report	Camara 13'; Romarinho 24'; Hawsawi (yellow card) 43'; Hegazi (yellow card) 48'; El Ahmadi (yellow card) 64'	Stadium: King Saud Sport City Stadium; Attendance: 0 Referee: Mohammed Al-Qarni

25 January 2021 15	Al-Ittihad	1–1	Al-Nassr	Mecca
20:10	Al-Malki (yellow card) 59'; Al-Bishi (yellow card) 89'; Romarinho 90+3'	Report	K. Al-Ghannam 63'; Al-Ghamdi (yellow card) 74'; Al-Khalaf (yellow card) 78'; Petros (yellow card) 86'	Stadium: King Abdul Aziz Stadium; Attendance: 0 Referee: Khaled Salwi

30 January 2021 16	Al-Ettifaq	2–0	Al-Ittihad	Dammam
18:00	Hazazi (yellow card) 6'; Al-Robeai 9'; Al-Hazaa 56'; Al-Qumaizi (yellow card) 68'; Souza (yellow card) 85'	Report	Al-Aboud (yellow card) 45'; Al-Sahafi (yellow card) 62'	Stadium: Prince Mohamed bin Fahd Stadium; Attendance: 0 Referee: Majed Al-Shamrani

4 February 2021 17	Al-Ittihad	4–1	Al-Fateh	Mecca
18:50	Al-Muwallad 9'; Prijović 31', 51'; Al-Aboud (yellow card) 85'; Grohe (yellow card) 90+3'; Camara 90+3'	Report	te Vrede 2'; Buhimed (yellow card) 35'; Al-Fuhaid (yellow card) 45'; Saâdane (yellow card) 53'	Stadium: King Abdul Aziz Stadium; Attendance: 0 Referee: Ahmad Al-Rumaikhani

11 February 2021 18	Al-Ahli	1–1	Al-Ittihad	Jeddah
20:20	Ghareeb 24'; Hawsawi (yellow card) 34'; Al-Asmari (yellow card) 45+1'; Fejsa (yellow card) 56'; Lima (yellow card) 90+4'	Report	Hegazi 86'	Stadium: King Abdullah Sports City Reserve Stadium; Attendance: 0 Referee: Mohammed Al-Hoaish

18 February 2021 19	Al-Taawoun	1–2	Al-Ittihad	Buraidah
15:55	Sané 16'; Al-Mousa (yellow card) 65'; Al-Zubaidi (yellow card) 86'	Report	Romarinho 49'; Cássio 68' (o.g.)	Stadium: King Abdullah Sport City Stadium; Attendance: 0 Referee: Mohammed Al-Qarni

23 February 2021 20	Al-Ittihad	1–3	Al-Faisaly	Mecca
19:00	Romarinho 28'; Al Mansor (yellow card) 55'; Hegazi (yellow card) 88'	Report	Silva (yellow card) 10'; Al-Ahmed (yellow card) 38'; Al Mansor 73' (o.g.); Tavares 82'; Merkel 90+3'	Stadium: King Abdul Aziz Stadium; Attendance: 0 Referee: Khaled Al-Teris

28 February 2021 21	Al-Qadsiah	1–4	Al-Ittihad	Dammam
18:15	Andria 31'; Al-Amri (yellow card) 42'; Masrahi (yellow card) 43'	Report	Prijović 43', 69', 82'; Al-Sahafi 65'	Stadium: Prince Mohamed bin Fahd Stadium; Attendance: 0 Referee: Mohammed Al-Harbi

5 March 2021 22	Al-Ittihad	4–2	Al-Wehda	Mecca
20:35	Abdulhamid (yellow card) 24'; Romarinho 52' (pen.), 72', 90+5'; Al-Muwallad 66'	Report	Al-Qarni (yellow card) 42'; Hernâni (yellow card) 64', (goal) 74'; Luisinho (yellow card) 79'; Abdu Jaber 84'	Stadium: King Abdul Aziz Stadium; Attendance: 0 Referee: Ahmed Al-Rumaikhani

10 March 2021 23	Al-Ittihad	2–1	Al-Shabab	Mecca
20:45	Al-Aboud 12'; El Ahmadi (yellow card) 29'; Al-Sahafi (yellow card) 40'; Al-Malki (yellow card) 74'; Al-Muwallad 82' (pen.)	Report	Martins (yellow card) 9'; Banega (yellow card) 22'; Sebá 43'; Lichnovsky (yellow card) 80'; Al-Abed (yellow card) 84'; Guanca (yellow card) 86'; Al-Sqoor (yellow card) 87'	Stadium: King Abdul Aziz Stadium; Attendance: 0 Referee: Khaled Salwi

20 March 2021 24	Al-Raed	1–1	Al-Ittihad	Buraidah
16:15	Fouzair (yellow card) 16' (yellow-red card) 86'; Al-Showaish (yellow card) 16'; Al-Farhan (yellow card) 24'; El Berkaoui 69'	Report	El Ahmadi (yellow card) 19'; Hegazi (red card) 37'; Romarinho 64'; Al-Sahafi (yellow card) 89'	Stadium: King Abdullah Sport City Stadium; Attendance: 0 Referee: Khaled Al-Teris

9 April 2021 25	Al-Ittihad	2–0	Al-Hilal	Mecca
20:50	Fallatah 26'; Abdulhamid 45'; Grohe (yellow card) 80'	Report	Kurdi (yellow card) 77'	Stadium: King Abdul Aziz Stadium; Attendance: 0 Referee: Rédouane Jiyed (Morocco)

16 April 2021 26	Al-Ittihad	0–0	Al-Batin	Mecca
22:10	Al-Jebreen (yellow card) 64'; Hegazi (yellow card) 90+3'	Report	Sami (yellow card) 18'; Freeh (yellow card) 90+7'	Stadium: King Abdul Aziz Stadium; Attendance: 0 Referee: Sami Al-Jires

15 May 2021 27	Damac	1–1	Al-Ittihad	Abha
21:00	Zelaya 8'; Al Haydar (yellow card) 64'	Report	El Ahmadi (yellow card) 44'; Al-Yami (yellow card) 78'; Rodrigues 84'; Al Mansor (yellow card) 89'	Stadium: Prince Sultan bin Abdul Aziz Stadium; Attendance: 0 Referee: Mohammed Al-Qarni

20 May 2021 28	Abha	1–2	Al-Ittihad	Abha
19:15	Al-Amri 35' (pen.); Tatar (yellow card) 83'	Report	Prijović 7', (yellow card) 72'; Al-Malki 42'; El Ahmadi (yellow card) 80'	Stadium: Prince Sultan bin Abdul Aziz Stadium; Attendance: 1,117; Referee: Khaled Salwi

25 May 2021 29	Al-Ittihad	1–0	Al-Ain	Jeddah
21:00	Hegazi 31'; Abdulhamid (yellow card) 88'	Report	Ndiaye (yellow card) 45+2'	Stadium: King Abdullah Sports City; Attendance: 211; Referee: Khaled Al-Teris

30 May 2021 30	Al-Nassr	1–2	Al-Ittihad	Riyadh
21:00	Hamdallah 27' (pen.), (yellow card) 50'; Madu (yellow card) 45+4'; Petros (yellow card) 48'; Al-Khaibari (yellow card) 60'	Report	Romarinho 19'; Al-Malki (yellow card) 52'; Al-Shamrani (yellow card) 68'; Al-Bishi 78', (yellow card) 88'; Al-Aboud (yellow card) 86' (yellow-red card) 90+4'	Stadium: Mrsool Park; Attendance: 7,960; Referee: Turki Al-Khudhayr

=== King Cup ===
All times are local, AST (UTC+3).

17 December 2020 Round of 16	Al-Wehda	0–3	Al-Ittihad	Mecca
20:20	Al-Khulaif (yellow card) 27'; Al-Eisa (yellow card) 76'	Report	Prijović 48' (pen.), 49'; Pedrão 71' (o.g.)	Stadium: King Abdul Aziz Stadium; Attendance: 0 Referee: Khaled Al-Teris

16 March 2021 Quarter-finals	Al-Ittihad	1–2 (a.e.t.)	Al-Fateh	Mecca
20:45	Al-Malki (yellow card) 15'; Prijović (yellow card) 52'; Camara (yellow card) 65'; Abdulhamid (yellow card) 68' (yellow-red card) 75'; Hegazi 120'; Al-Muwallad (yellow card) 120+3'	Report	Bendebka (yellow card) 7' (yellow-red card) 90+2'; Al-Fuhaid (yellow card) 14'; Boushal (yellow card) 30'; Batna 113'; Majrashi 118'; Al-Zaqaan (yellow card) 119'	Stadium: King Abdul Aziz Stadium; Attendance: 0 Referee: Majed Al-Shamrani

=== Arab Club Champions Cup ===
==== Semi-finals ====
2 December 2020 First leg	Al-Shabab (Saudi Arabia)	2–2	(Saudi Arabia) Al-Ittihad	Riyadh, Saudi Arabia
19:45 AST	Lichnovsky (yellow card) 40', (goal) 79'; Guanca 49'	Report	Hegazi (yellow card) 3'; Romarinho 11'; Al-Malki (yellow card) 72'; Rodrigues 82'	Stadium: Prince Khalid bin Sultan Stadium; Attendance: 0 Referee: Ahmed Al-Kaf (Oman)

4 January 2021 Second leg	Al-Ittihad (Saudi Arabia)	2–1	(Saudi Arabia) Al-Shabab	Mecca, Saudi Arabia
20:00 AST	Abdulhamid (yellow card) 30'; Hegazi (yellow card) 57'; Romarinho 74'; Prijović 90+2'	Report	Martins 1', (yellow card) 64'; Banega (yellow card) 59'; Lichnovsky (yellow card) 86'; Salem (yellow card) 90'	Stadium: King Abdul Aziz Stadium; Attendance: 0 Referee: Majed Al-Shamrani (Saudi Arabia)

== Statistics ==
=== Appearances ===
Last updated on 30 May 2021.

No.	Pos	Nat	Player	Total		Pro League		King Cup		Arab Club Champions Cup	
No.	Pos	Nat	Player	Apps	Goals	Apps	Goals	Apps	Goals	Apps	Goals
Goalkeepers
1	GK	(Saudi Arabia) KSA	Rakan Al-Najjar	0	0	0	0	0	0	0	0
12	GK	(Saudi Arabia) KSA	Mohammed Abo Asidah	0	0	0	0	0	0	0	0
22	GK	(Saudi Arabia) KSA	Fawaz Al-Qarni	1	0	1	0	0	0	0	0
34	GK	(Brazil) BRA	Marcelo Grohe	33	0	29	0	2	0	2	0
Defenders
4	DF	(Saudi Arabia) KSA	Ziyad Al-Sahafi	23	1	20	1	2	0	1	0
5	DF	(Saudi Arabia) KSA	Omar Hawsawi	19	0	10+7	0	0	0	1+1	0
13	DF	(Saudi Arabia) KSA	Muhannad Al-Shanqeeti	28	0	20+4	0	2	0	2	0
17	DF	(Mali) MLI	Ahmed Emad Eldin	0	0	0	0	0	0	0	0
21	DF	(Saudi Arabia) KSA	Abdulmohsen Fallatah	2	1	1+1	1	0	0	0	0
26	DF	(Egypt) EGY	Ahmed Hegazi	30	3	26	2	2	1	2	0
27	DF	(Saudi Arabia) KSA	Hamdan Al-Shamrani	18	0	12+5	0	0	0	0+1	0
28	DF	(Saudi Arabia) KSA	Hamad Al Mansor	13	0	3+8	0	0+2	0	0	0
66	DF	(Saudi Arabia) KSA	Saud Abdulhamid	32	1	28	1	2	0	2	0
76	DF	(Saudi Arabia) KSA	Hazim Al-Zahrani	0	0	0	0	0	0	0	0
Midfielders
7	MF	(Saudi Arabia) KSA	Abdulmajeed Al-Swat	14	0	1+10	0	0+1	0	1+1	0
8	MF	(Saudi Arabia) KSA	Fahad Al-Muwallad	25	4	15+8	4	0+1	0	1	0
10	MF	(Cape Verde) CPV	Garry Rodrigues	19	5	14+3	4	1	0	1	1
11	MF	(Saudi Arabia) KSA	Abdulaziz Al-Bishi	28	1	21+6	1	1	0	0	0
14	MF	(Saudi Arabia) KSA	Awad Al-Nashri	1	0	0+1	0	0	0	0	0
16	MF	(Saudi Arabia) KSA	Abdulaziz Al-Jebreen	14	0	3+8	0	0+2	0	0+1	0
19	MF	(Brazil) BRA	Bruno Henrique	18	1	14+3	1	0	0	1	0
20	MF	(Morocco) MAR	Karim El Ahmadi	27	0	22+2	0	2	0	1	0
23	MF	(Saudi Arabia) KSA	Mohammed Al-Oufi	4	0	0+4	0	0	0	0	0
24	MF	(Saudi Arabia) KSA	Abdulrahman Al-Aboud	26	3	14+9	3	2	0	1	0
25	MF	(Saudi Arabia) KSA	Hassan Al-Asmari	0	0	0	0	0	0	0	0
29	MF	(Saudi Arabia) KSA	Ahmed Bahusayn	2	0	0+2	0	0	0	0	0
88	MF	(Saudi Arabia) KSA	Abdulellah Al-Malki	27	1	21+2	1	2	0	2	0
Forwards
3	FW	(Saudi Arabia) KSA	Abdulrahman Al-Yami	6	0	0+4	0	0+1	0	0+1	0
9	FW	(Serbia) SRB	Aleksandar Prijović	31	10	21+7	7	2	2	0+1	1
70	FW	(Saudi Arabia) KSA	Haroune Camara	26	2	3+19	2	0+2	0	2	0
90	FW	(Brazil) BRA	Romarinho	34	18	29+1	16	2	0	2	2
Players sent out on loan this season
6	MF	(Saudi Arabia) KSA	Khaled Al-Sumairi	6	0	1+4	0	0+1	0	0	0
98	MF	(Saudi Arabia) KSA	Abdulmajeed Al-Zahrani	1	0	0+1	0	0	0	0	0
Player who made an appearance this season but have left the club
15	DF	(Brazil) BRA	Bruno Uvini	1	0	1	0	0	0	0	0

=== Goalscorers ===
Rank	No.	Pos	Nat	Name	Pro League	King Cup	Arab Club Champions Cup	Total
1	90	FW	(Brazil)	Romarinho	16	0	2	18
2	9	FW	(Serbia)	Aleksandar Prijović	7	2	1	10
3	10	MF	(Cape Verde)	Garry Rodrigues	4	0	1	5
4	8	MF	(Saudi Arabia)	Fahad Al-Muwallad	4	0	0	4
5	24	MF	(Saudi Arabia)	Abdulrahman Al-Aboud	3	0	0	3
5	26	DF	(Egypt)	Ahmed Hegazi	2	1	0	3
7	70	FW	(Saudi Arabia)	Haroune Camara	2	0	0	2
8	4	DF	(Saudi Arabia)	Ziyad Al-Sahafi	1	0	0	1
8	19	MF	(Brazil)	Bruno Henrique	1	0	0	1
8	21	DF	(Saudi Arabia)	Abdulmohsen Fallatah	1	0	0	1
8	66	DF	(Saudi Arabia)	Saud Abdulhamid	1	0	0	1
8	77	MF	(Saudi Arabia)	Abdulaziz Al-Bishi	1	0	0	1
8	88	MF	(Saudi Arabia)	Abdulellah Al-Malki	1	0	0	1
Own goal					1	1	0	1
Total					45	4	4	53

Last Updated: 30 May 2021

=== Assists ===
Rank	No.	Pos	Nat	Name	Pro League	King Cup	Arab Club Champions Cup	Total
1	8	MF	(Saudi Arabia)	Fahad Al-Muwallad	4	0	1	5
1	10	MF	(Cape Verde)	Garry Rodrigues	3	1	1	5
1	77	MF	(Saudi Arabia)	Abdulaziz Al-Bishi	5	0	0	5
4	66	DF	(Saudi Arabia)	Saud Abdulhamid	4	0	0	4
5	19	MF	(Brazil)	Bruno Henrique	3	0	0	3
5	90	FW	(Brazil)	Romarinho	3	0	0	3
7	9	FW	(Serbia)	Aleksandar Prijović	2	0	0	2
7	70	FW	(Saudi Arabia)	Haroune Camara	2	0	0	2
8	5	DF	(Saudi Arabia)	Omar Hawsawi	1	0	0	1
8	24	MF	(Saudi Arabia)	Abdulrahman Al-Aboud	1	0	0	1
8	28	DF	(Saudi Arabia)	Hamad Al Mansor	0	1	0	1
8	88	MF	(Saudi Arabia)	Abdulellah Al-Malki	1	0	0	1
Total					29	2	2	33

Last Updated: 30 May 2021

=== Clean sheets ===
Rank	No.	Pos	Nat	Name	Pro League	King Cup	Arab Club Champions Cup	Total
1	34	GK	(Brazil)	Marcelo Grohe	6	1	0	7
2	22	GK	(Saudi Arabia)	Fawaz Al-Qarni	1	0	0	1
Total					7	1	0	8

Last Updated: 25 May 2021
