= Romarinho (footballer, born December 1990) =

Brazilian footballer

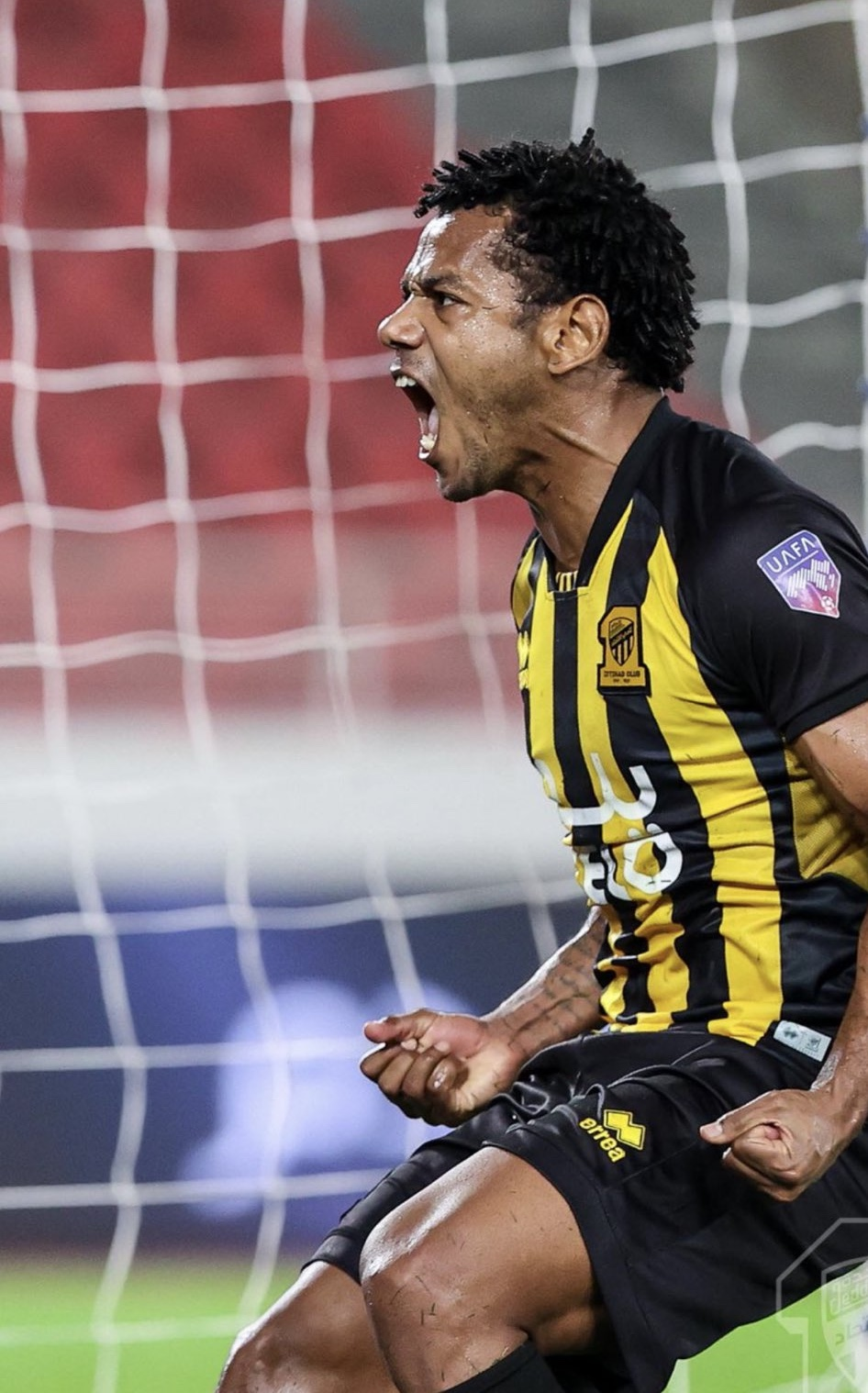
- Romarinho celebrating a goal for Al-Ittihad in 2021

Personal information
- Full name: Romário Ricardo da Silva
- Date of birth: 12 December 1990 (age 35)
- Place of birth: Palestina, Brazil
- Height: 1.73 m (5 ft 8 in)
- Position: Forward

Team information
- Current team: Portuguesa
- Number: 21

Youth career
- 2005–2008: Rio Preto
- 2008–2009: Rio Branco-SP

Senior career*
Years	Team	Apps	(Gls)
2009–2010	Rio Branco-SP	27	(3)
2010–2011	Desportivo Brasil	19	(12)
2011	→ São Bernardo (loan)	6	(0)
2011–2012	Bragantino	46	(16)
2012–2014	Corinthians	121	(21)
2014–2017	El Jaish	72	(40)
2017–2018	Al-Jazira	20	(7)
2018–2024	Al-Ittihad	172	(76)
2024–2025	Neom	18	(10)
2025	Al-Rayyan	3	(0)
2025	Vitória	5	(0)
2027–	Portuguesa	0	(0)
- * Club domestic league appearances and goals as of 21:43, 24 June 2025 (UTC)

Romário Ricardo da Silva (born 12 December 1990), commonly known as Romarinho (not to be confused with Romarinho Faria) is a Brazilian professional footballer who plays as a forward for Portuguesa.

== Career ==
=== Early career ===
Born in Palestina, a small city in the São Paulo state, Romarinho began playing in a local school at the age of five, and later had trials at Vitória and São Paulo FC, where he was unable to stay due to homesickness. He played for Rio Preto and Rio Branco-SP as a youth, making his first team debut with the latter in the 2009 Campeonato Paulista Série A2 and helping the club to achieve promotion to the Campeonato Paulista.

After leaving Rio Branco after the 2010 Paulistão, Romarinho played for Desportivo Brasil (where he was the top scorer of the club in the Campeonato Paulista Segunda Divisão) before being loaned to São Bernardo in 2011. After suffering relegation and featuring rarely, he was released and spent four months without a club before signing for Bragantino.

Romarinho ended the 2011 season with nine goals for Bragantino, and was named the breakthrough player of the 2012 Campeonato Paulista while at the club.

=== Corinthians ===
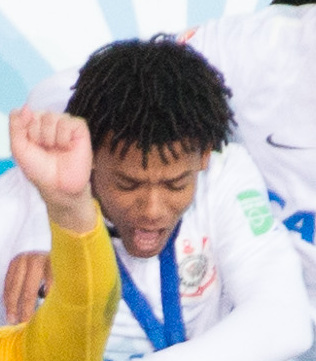
Romarinho celebrating the 2012 FIFA Club World Cup title with Corinthians

On 29 May 2012, Romarinho signed a four-year contract with Corinthians, after the club beat off competition from Santos for his signing. He made his club debut on 10 June, replacing Douglas late into a 2–0 away loss to Grêmio.

Romarinho was handed his first start by head coach Tite on 24 June 2012, and scored a brace in a 2–1 home win over rivals Palmeiras. Three days later, he came off the bench to score the equalizer in a 1–1 draw against Boca Juniors at the La Bombonera, for the first leg of the 2012 Copa Libertadores finals.

Romarinho was also a part of the squad which won the 2012 FIFA Club World Cup; he came on as a substitute in the semifinal against Al Ahly, but remained unused in the final against Chelsea. In the following campaign, he became an regular starter, and scored a hat-trick in a 3–0 Campeonato Paulista home win over Atlético Sorocaba on 23 March 2014.

=== El Jaish ===
On 7 September 2014, Romarinho moved abroad for the first time in his career, joining Qatar Stars League side El Jaish for a rumoured fee of around €8 million. He made his club debut six days later, starting and scored the side's second in a 3–1 home win over Al-Arabi.

Romarinho was an undisputed starter during his three-season spell at the club, scoring 21 times in two of those three years.

=== Al Jazira ===
Romarinho Romarinho playing for Al Jazira at the 2017 FIFA Club World Cup

In August 2017, Romarinho moved to UAE Pro League outfit Al Jazira on a free transfer. He played in the 2017 FIFA Club World Cup where he was the top goalscorer, alongside Cristiano Ronaldo and Maurício Antônio.

=== Al-Ittihad ===
On 9 August 2018, Romarinho signed a long-term contract with Saudi Pro League side Al-Ittihad after the clubs agreed a fee of €7,000,000. During the 2019–20 season, he scored a career-best 26 goals in 42 appearances overall.

In the 2022–23 Saudi Pro League, Romarinho was named in the team of the season as Al-Ittihad won the club's first league title in 14 years.

=== Neom ===
On 10 June 2024, Romarinho joined Saudi First Division League club Neom on a free transfer. The following 1 February, despite scoring ten goals in just 18 appearances, he left after terminating his contract with the club.

=== Al-Rayyan ===
On 6 February 2025, Romarinho returned to Qatar after joining Al-Rayyan on a short term deal. There, he only played three matches in the AFC Champions League Elite before departing.

=== Vitória ===
On 17 July 2025, Romarinho returned to Brazil after 11 years, signing a one-year contract with Vitória in the top tier. He initially struggled with a calf injury shortly after his club debut, and terminated his link on 20 October, after just five matches, due to "personal reasons". It was later revealed that the departure coincided with a four-month suspension after being caught in a doping exam back in 2023 in Saudi Arabia; Vitória alleged the club did not know about the ban.

=== Portuguesa ===
Romarinho spent the entire 2026 campaign without a club before joining Portuguesa on 18 September of that year, for the 2027 season.

== Career statistics ==
As of 22 September 2026

Appearances and goals by club, season and competition
Club	Season	League			State league (Note: Includes Campeonato Paulista, Campeonato Paulista Série A2, Campeonato Paulista Segunda Divisão)		National cup (Note: Includes Copa do Brasil, Emir of Qatar Cup, UAE President's Cup, King's Cup)		Continental		Other		Total	
Club	Season	Division	Apps	Goals	Apps	Goals	Apps	Goals	Apps	Goals	Apps	Goals	Apps	Goals
Rio Branco SP	2009	Paulista A2	—		14	2	—		—		10 (Note: Appearances in Copa Paulista)	2	24	4
Rio Branco SP	2010	Paulista	—		13	1	—		—		—		13	1
Rio Branco SP	Total		—		27	3	—		—		10	2	37	5
Desportivo Brasil	2010	Paulista 2ª Divisão	—		19	12	—		—		—		19	12
São Bernardo (loan)	2011	Paulista	—		6	0	—		—		—		6	0
Bragantino	2011	Série B	21	9	—		—		—		—		21	9
Bragantino	2012	Série B	2	1	23	6	—		—		—		25	7
Bragantino	Total		23	10	23	6	—		—		—		46	16
Corinthians	2012	Série A	32	6	—		—		1 (Note: Appearance(s) in Copa Libertadores)	1	1 (Note: Appearance in FIFA Club World Cup)	0	34	7
Corinthians	2013	Série A	37	1	20	3	7	1	7	1	2 (Note: Appearances in Recopa Sudamericana)	1	73	7
Corinthians	2014	Série A	17	3	15	8	5	1	—		—		37	12
Corinthians	Total		86	10	35	11	12	2	8	2	3	1	144	26
El Jaish	2014–15	Qatar Stars League	24	16	—		3	3	2 (Note: Appearance(s) in AFC Champions League)	1	2 (Note: Appearances in AFC Champions League play-off)	1	31	21
El Jaish	2015–16	Qatar Stars League	24	10	—		2	3	13	8	2	1	41	22
El Jaish	2016–17	Qatar Stars League	24	14	—		2	3	1	0	2	1	29	18
El Jaish	Total		72	40	—		7	9	16	9	6	3	101	61
Al Jazira	2017–18	UAE Pro League	20	7	—		2	0	8	6	12 (Note: Seven appearances and two goals in UAE League Cup, one appearance in UAE Super Cup, four appearances and two goals in FIFA Club World Cup)	4	42	17
Al-Ittihad	2018–19	Saudi Pro League	27	7	—		6	8	6	3	2 (Note: One appearance in Arab Club Champions Cup, one appearance in Saudi Super Cup)	0	41	18
Al-Ittihad	2019–20	Saudi Pro League	30	15	—		3	4	4	2	5 (Note: Appearances in Arab Club Champions Cup)	5	42	26
Al-Ittihad	2020–21	Saudi Pro League	30	16	—		2	0	—		2	2	34	18
Al-Ittihad	2021–22	Saudi Pro League	29	20	—		3	2	—		1	3	33	25
Al-Ittihad	2022–23	Saudi Pro League	28	13	—		3	0	—		2 (Note: Appearances in Saudi Super Cup)	1	33	14
Al-Ittihad	2023–24	Saudi Pro League	28	5	—		4	0	6	2	8 (Note: Four appearances and one goal in Arab Club Champions Cup, Two appearances and one goal in FIFA Club World Cup)	2	46	9
Al-Ittihad	Total		172	76	—		21	14	16	7	20	13	229	110
Neom	2024–25	Saudi First Division League	18	10	—		0	0	—		—		18	10
Al-Rayyan	2024–25	Qatar Stars League	—		—		—		3 (Note: Appearances in AFC Champions League Elite)	0	—		3	0
Vitória	2025	Série A	5	0	—		—		—		—		5	0
Portuguesa	2027	Série D	0	0	0	0	—		—		—		0	0
Career total			396	153	110	31	42	25	51	24	51	23	650	256

== Honours ==
Corinthians

- Copa Libertadores: 2012
- Recopa Sudamericana: 2013
- FIFA Club World Cup: 2012
- Campeonato Paulista: 2013

Jaish

- Qatar Cup: 2014, 2016

Al-Ittihad

- Saudi Pro League: 2022–23
- Saudi Super Cup: 2022

Neom

- Saudi First Division League: 2024–25

Individual

- Fans' Asian Champions League XI: 2016
- Saudi Pro League Player of the Month: September 2019, January 2022
- Saudi Pro League Team of the Year: 2022–23
