= Awad Al-Nashri =

Saudi Arabian footballer

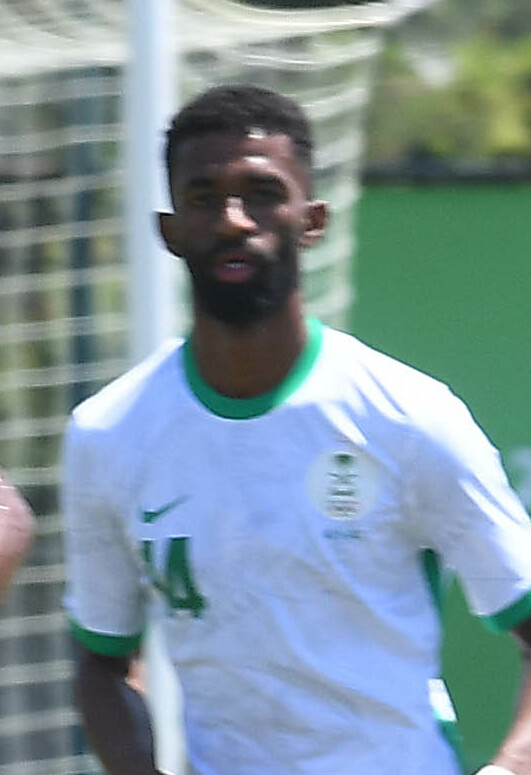
- Al-Nashri playing for Saudi Arabia U23 in 2022

Personal information
- Full name: Awad Haidar Al-Nashri
- Date of birth: 15 March 2002 (age 24)
- Place of birth: Jeddah, Saudi Arabia
- Height: 1.75 m (5 ft 9 in)
- Position: Midfielder

Team information
- Current team: Al Shabab
- Number: 6

Youth career
- –2020: Al-Ittihad

Senior career*
Years	Team	Apps	(Gls)
2020–2026	Al-Ittihad	68	(0)
2026–	Al-Shabab	3	(0)

International career^{‡}
2020–2021	Saudi Arabia U20		
2021–	Saudi Arabia U23		
2023–	Saudi Arabia	3	(0)
Medal record
Men's football
Representing Saudi Arabia
Islamic Solidarity Games
Silver medal – second place	2021 Konya
- * Club domestic league appearances and goals as of 19 October 2026 ‡ National team caps and goals as of 12 January 2023

Awad Haidar Al-Nashri (Arabic: عوض حيدر الناشري; born 15 March 2002), is a Saudi Arabian professional footballer who plays as a midfielder.

== International career ==
In June 2023, he took part in the Maurice Revello Tournament in France with Saudi Arabia.

== Career statistics ==
=== Club ===
As of match played 28 May 2024.

Club	Season	League			Cup		Continental		Other		Total	
Club	Season	Division	Apps	Goals	Apps	Goals	Apps	Goals	Apps	Goals	Apps	Goals
Al-Ittihad	2019–20	Saudi Pro League	3	0	0	0	0	0	0	0	3	0
Al-Ittihad	2020–21	Saudi Pro League	1	0	0	0	—		0	0	1	0
Al-Ittihad	2021–22	Saudi Pro League	12	0	0	0	—		0	0	12	0
Al-Ittihad	2022–23	Saudi Pro League	21	0	3	0	—		1 (Note: Appearance(s) in Saudi Super Cup)	0	25	0
Al-Ittihad	2023–24	Saudi Pro League	7	0	1	0	1	0	3 (Note: Appearance(s) in Arab Club Champions Cup)	0	12	0
Career total			44	0	4	0	1	0	4	0	53	0

== Honours ==
Al-Ittihad

- Saudi Pro League: 2022–23, 2024–25
- King's Cup: 2024–25
- Saudi Super Cup: 2022

Saudi Arabia U23

- AFC U-23 Asian Cup: 2022
- WAFF U-23 Championship: 2022
