= Muhannad Al-Shanqeeti =

Saudi Arabian association football player

Personal information
- Full name: Muhannad Mustafa Al-Shanqeeti
- Date of birth: 12 March 1999 (age 27)
- Place of birth: Medina, Saudi Arabia
- Height: 1.71 m (5 ft 7 in)
- Position: Right-back

Team information
- Current team: Al-Ittihad
- Number: 13

Senior career*
Years	Team	Apps	(Gls)
2016–2018	Ohod	14	(1)
2018–	Al-Ittihad	155	(6)

International career^{‡}
2017–2019	Saudi Arabia U20	23	(0)
2019–2022	Saudi Arabia U23	10	(0)
2021–2025	Saudi Arabia	5	(0)
- * Club domestic league appearances and goals as of October 30, 2026 ‡ National team caps and goals as of September 8, 2025

Muhannad Mustafa Al-Shanqeeti (Arabic: مهند مصطفى الشنقيطي; born 12 March 1999) is a Saudi Arabian footballer who plays as defender for Pro League side Al-Ittihad and the Saudi Arabia national team.

== Career ==
Al-Shanqeeti began his career at the youth team of hometown club Ohod. He made his debut for the first team during the 2016–17 season. He scored his first goal for the club on 10 March 2017, scoring in the 2–0 win against Al-Adalah. He made 9 appearances and scored once during the 2016–17 season, helping Ohod finish second and earn promotion to the Pro League. On 18 August 2017, Al-Shanqeeti made his Pro League debut for Ohod in the 2–0 defeat to Al-Batin.

On 22 November 2018, Al-Shanqeeti joined Al-Ittihad on a free transfer. On 30 June 2019, Al-Shanqeeti was chosen in the scholarship program to develop football talents established by the General Sports Authority in Saudi Arabia. On 28 December 2019, Al-Shanqeeti made his debut for Al-Ittihad in the 1–1 draw against Al-Fateh. On 5 May 2021, Al-Shanqeeti renewed his contract with Al-Ittihad until the end of the 2023–24 season. On 18 March 2022, Al-Shanqeeti scored his first goal for the club in a 3–0 win against Al-Hazem. Following his impressive performances in March, Al-Shanqeeti was awarded the Young Player of the Month award. On 25 September 2023, Al-Shanqeeti renewed his contract with Al-Ittihad until the end of the 2028–29 season.

== Career statistics ==
=== Club ===
As of match played 16 January 2025

Club	Season	League			King's Cup		Asia		Other		Total	
Club	Season	Division	Apps	Goals	Apps	Goals	Apps	Goals	Apps	Goals	Apps	Goals
Ohod	2016–17	Saudi First Division League	9	1	0	0	—		—		9	1
Ohod	2017–18	Saudi Pro League	5	0	1	0	—		—		6	0
Ohod	Total		14	1	1	0	0	0	0	0	15	1
Al-Ittihad	2018–19	Saudi Pro League	0	0	0	0	0	0	—		0	0
Al-Ittihad	2019–20	Saudi Pro League	5	0	1	0	—		1 (Note: Appearance(s) in Arab Club Champions Cup)	0	7	0
Al-Ittihad	2020–21	Saudi Pro League	24	0	2	0	—		2	0	28	0
Al-Ittihad	2021–22	Saudi Pro League	28	1	1	0	—		1	0	30	1
Al-Ittihad	2022–23	Saudi Pro League	11	0	1	0	—		2 (Note: Appearance(s) in Saudi Super Cup)	1	14	1
Al-Ittihad	2023–24	Saudi Pro League	21	1	1	0	4 (Note: Appearances in AFC Champions League)	0	5 (Note: Three appearances in Arab Club Champions Cup, and two appearances in FIFA Club World Cup)	0	31	1
Al-Ittihad	2024–25	Saudi Pro League	14	0	2	0	—		—		16	0
Al-Ittihad	Total		103	2	8	0	4	0	11	1	126	3
Career total			117	3	9	0	4	0	11	1	141	4

== Honours ==
Al-Ittihad

- Saudi Pro League: 2022–23, 2024–25
- King's Cup: 2024–25
- Saudi Super Cup: 2022

Saudi Arabia U19

- AFC U-19 Championship: 2018

Individual

- Saudi Pro League Young Player of the Month: March 2022
