= Garry Rodrigues =

Dutch-Cape Verdean footballer (born 1990)

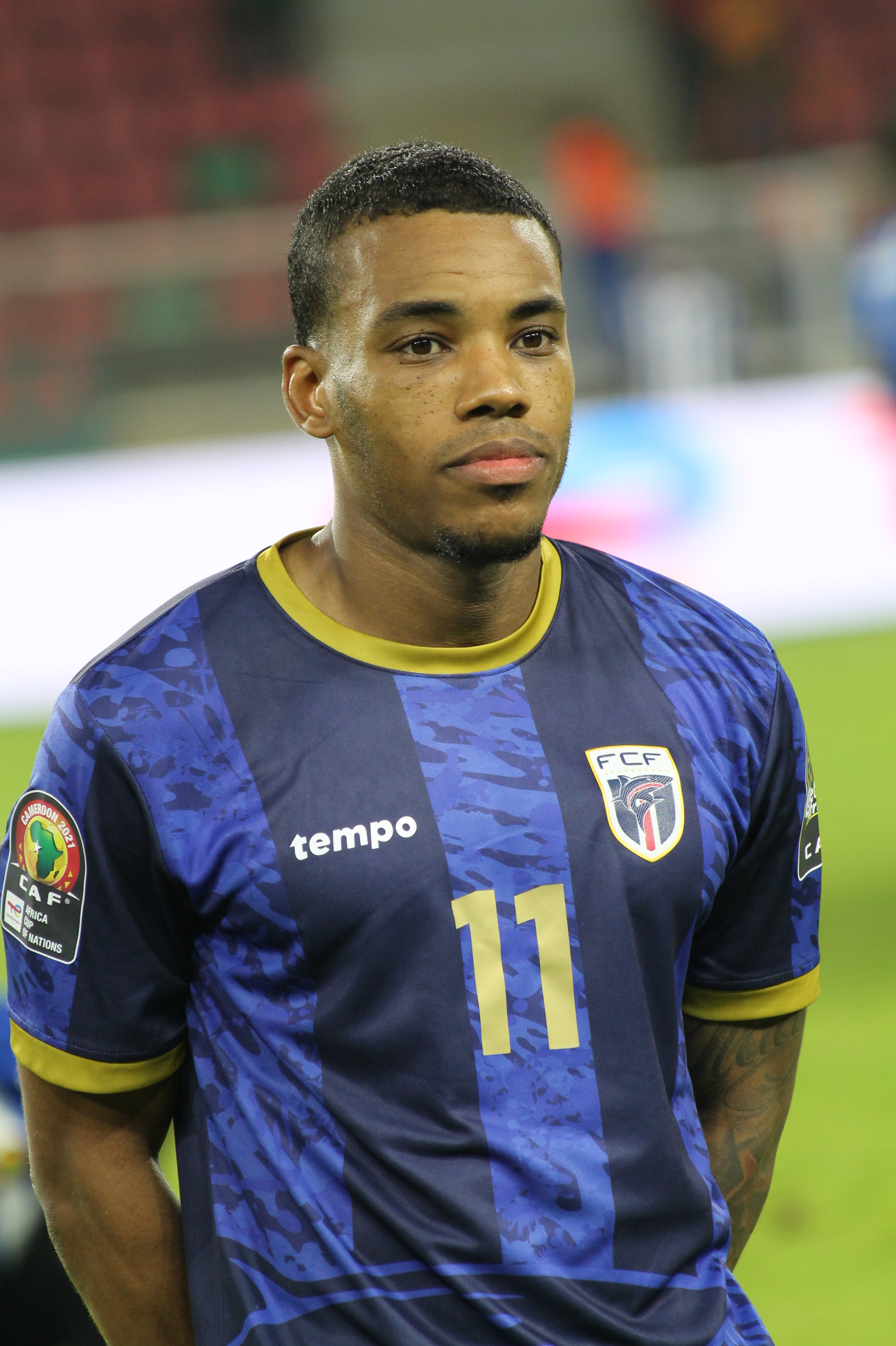
- Rodrigues with Cape Verde at the 2021 Africa Cup of Nations

Personal information
- Full name: Garry Mendes Rodrigues
- Date of birth: 27 November 1990 (age 35)
- Place of birth: Rotterdam, Netherlands
- Height: 1.72 m (5 ft 8 in)
- Position: Winger

Team information
- Current team: Apollon Limassol
- Number: 10

Youth career
- 2004–2008: Feyenoord Rotterdam
- 2007–2009: Real SC

Senior career*
Years	Team	Apps	(Gls)
2009–2010	XerxesDZB	15	(2)
2011	Rostocker FC	0	(0)
2011–2012	Boshuizen	12	(1)
2012–2013	ADO Den Haag	0	(0)
2012–2013	→ Dordrecht (loan)	20	(5)
2013–2014	Levski Sofia	35	(13)
2014–2015	Elche	41	(3)
2015–2017	PAOK	38	(9)
2017–2019	Galatasaray	61	(13)
2019–2021	Al-Ittihad	28	(5)
2019–2020	→ Fenerbahçe (loan)	26	(4)
2021–2023	Olympiacos	37	(7)
2023–2024	Ankaragücü	23	(2)
2024–2025	Sivasspor	27	(4)
2025–	Apollon Limassol	36	(10)

International career^{‡}
2013–	Cape Verde	65	(10)
- * Club domestic league appearances and goals as of 11 October 2026 ‡ National team caps and goals as of 29 September 2026

Garry Mendes Rodrigues (Portuguese: [ɡa.ˈʀi ˈmẽ.dɨʒ ʀu.ˈdɾi.ɡɨʃ]; born 27 November 1990) is a professional footballer who plays as a winger for Cypriot First Division club Apollon Limassol. Born in the Netherlands, he plays for the Cape Verde national team.

In February 2013, Rodrigues announced that he would like to represent Cape Verde, and made his debut in August 2013. He represented the side at the 2015 and 2021 Africa Cup of Nations.

He formerly played for PAOK, Elche, XerxesDZB, Boshuizen, ADO Den Haag, Dordrecht, Levski Sofia, Galatasaray, Al-Ittihad, Fenerbahçe, Olympiacos, Ankaragücü & Sivasspor.

He is the cousin of Jerson Cabral.

== Club career ==
As a youth player Rodrigues played for Feyenoord and Portuguese Real Sport Clube.

Rodrigues joined Eredivisie club ADO Den Haag from amateur FC Boshuizen on 16 May 2012 after joining XerxesDZB, Rostocker & Boshuizen earlier, signing a 1+1 years contract. In July, he was loaned out to Eerste Divisie club Dordrecht. Rodrigues made his league debut in a 1–1 away draw against Emmen on 10 August, playing the full 90 minutes.

=== Levski Sofia ===
On 11 February 2013, Rodrigues signed a two-and-a-half-year contract with Bulgarian club Levski Sofia. He made his debut away at Chernomorets Burgas in a 2–0 win on 3 March. On 13 March, he scored his first goal for Levski in the 22nd minute of a Bulgarian Cup quarter-final first leg tie against Litex Lovech. On 20 April, in a 2–1 away victory over Litex, Rodrigues netted his first league goal and assisted Hristo Yovov.

On 21 July 2013, Rodrigues opened the scoring in Levski's first match of the 2013–14 A PFG season against Botev Plovdiv, but was subsequently sent off after an altercation with Veselin Minev.

During the first half of the 2013–14 season Rodrigues scored 14 goals in total helping Levski Sofia to overcome several teams and progress to the 3rd place in the league ranking. He also scored a penalty in the 7–6 win after penalties against CSKA Sofia in a Bulgarian Cup Eternal Derby third round tie, eventually helping the team to reach the quarter-finals of the competition. The strong overall performance led to the interest of several European clubs. In January 2014, West Ham United sent an offer to Levski for a trial, but Rodrigues refused it, stating that he would only negotiate with a team which is guaranteed to offer him a contract.

=== Elche ===
On 27 January 2014, Rodrigues signed with Elche CF on a six-month loan through Promoesport (an investment fund linked to Gimnàstic de Tarragona), with a buyout clause. He made his La Liga debut on 1 March, coming on as a second-half substitute in the 1–0 home win over Celta de Vigo, and scored his first goal in the category on 3 May, netting the game's only in an away success against Málaga CF.

In the 2014 summer Rodrigues signed a four-year deal with the Valencian club, after his buyout clause was activated. On 31 July 2015, he rescinded his link.

=== PAOK ===
On 4 August 2015, Rodrigues signed a three-year contract with PAOK for an undisclosed fee. On 23 September 2015, in a home derby game against AEK Athens he scored his first goal in Greek Super League. On 11 January 2016, PAOK turned down Al-Ahli Saudi FC's offer in the region of €1.7 million for Garry Rodrigues. He finished the season with seven goals being the third scorer of the club.

On 24 November 2016, in a UEFA Europa League group stage away match against ACF Fiorentina, Rodrigues scored a late goal to give PAOK a 3–2 win.

=== Galatasaray ===
On 9 January 2017, PAOK officially announced the transfer of Rodrigues to Galatasaray for a fee of €3.7 million. In February 2018, he was linked with a move to Lyon, having scored five goals and made eight assists in 22 Süper Lig appearances since the start of the 2017–18 season.

He was contracted to Galatasaray until the summer of 2021.

=== Al-Ittihad ===
On 6 January 2019, Rodrigues joined Al-Ittihad of Saudi Arabia for a fee of €9m.

=== Fenerbahçe ===
On 13 July 2019, Fenerbahçe announced the signing of Rodrigues on loan for 2 years from Al-Ittihad.

=== Olympiacos ===
On 18 September 2021, Olympiacos F.C. officially announced the signing of Rodrigues on a three-year contract with €1 million annual fee, including bonuses.

=== Ankaragücü ===
On 19 August 2023, he signed a two-year contract with Süper Lig club Ankaragücü.

=== Sivasspor ===
A year later, on 13 September 2024, Rodrigues moved across Türkiye to join Süper Lig team Sivasspor for free.

=== Apollon Limassol ===
On 25 June 2025, Garry Rodrigues joined Cypriot First Division team Apollon Limassol on a two-year deal for free.

== International career ==
Rodrigues received his first international call-up in August 2013 to play friendly match against Gabon on the 14th of that month. He substituted Djaniny at halftime. On 30 December 2013, Rodrigues appeared as a starter in the 1–4 loss against Catalonia in a friendly match, assisting his team's goal that was scored by Djaniny. On 6 September 2014 he scored his first international goal in a 3–1 away win over Niger in Cape Verde's successful qualification for the 2015 Africa Cup of Nations. Rodrigues was included in their squad for the finals in Equatorial Guinea, but due to competition from Kuca, Djaniny and Júlio Tavares he played only in the goalless draw with Zambia, which confirmed their elimination from Group B.

In January 2022, Rodrigues was a member of the Cape Verde squad that represented the nation at the 2021 Africa Cup of Nations. He appeared in all four of the team's matches, assisting Júlio Tavares' winning goal in their opening fixture against Ethiopia and scoring the equaliser in a 1–1 draw with host nation Cameroon which ensured their qualification to the knockout stage.

In December 2023, Rodrigues was named in Cape Verde's squad for his third Africa Cup of Nations – the 2023 tournament in the Ivory Coast. On 14 January 2024, in Cape Verde's opening match against Ghana, he scored a 92nd-minute goal to give the Tubarões Azuis a 2–1 win.

In May 2026, Rodrigues was announced as part of Cape Verde's 26-man squad for their maiden World Cup.

== Career statistics ==
=== Club ===
As of match played 20 September 2026

Appearances and goals by club, season and competition
Club	Season	League			Cup		Continental (Note: Includes UEFA Champions League, UEFA Europa League and Turkish Super Cup)		Total	
Club	Season	Division	Apps	Goals	Apps	Goals	Apps	Goals	Apps	Goals
Dordrecht	2012–13	Eerste Divisie	20	5	3	0	—		23	5
Levski Sofia	2012–13	Bulgarian A Football Group	14	3	5	4	—		19	7
Levski Sofia	2013–14	Bulgarian A Football Group	21	10	4	3	2	0	27	13
Levski Sofia	Total		35	13	9	7	2	0	46	20
Elche	2013–14	La Liga	10	1	0	0	—		10	1
Elche	2014–15	La Liga	31	2	1	0	—		32	2
Elche	Total		41	3	1	0	0	0	42	3
PAOK	2015–16	Super League Greece	26	6	2	0	8	1	36	7
PAOK	2016–17	Super League Greece	12	3	0	0	10	3	22	6
PAOK	Total		38	9	2	0	18	4	58	13
Galatasaray	2016–17	Süper Lig	16	1	2	1	—		18	2
Galatasaray	2017–18	Süper Lig	33	9	5	1	2	0	40	10
Galatasaray	2018–19	Süper Lig	12	3	1	0	7	1	20	4
Galatasaray	Total		61	13	8	2	9	1	78	16
Al-Ittihad	2018–19	Saudi Professional League	9	1	2	0	—		11	1
Al-Ittihad	2020–21	Saudi Professional League	17	4	1	0	—		18	4
Al-Ittihad	2021–22	Saudi Professional League	2	0	0	0	—		2	0
Al-Ittihad	Total		28	5	3	0	0	0	31	5
Fenerbahçe (loan)	2019–20	Süper Lig	26	4	3	0	—		29	4
Olympiacos	2021–22	Super League Greece	19	5	3	0	—		22	5
Olympiacos	2022–23	Super League Greece	18	2	6	1	5	0	29	3
Olympiacos	Total		37	7	9	1	5	0	51	8
Ankaragücü	2023–24	Süper Lig	19	2	3	1	—		22	3
Ankaragücü	2024–25	TFF First League	4	0	0	0	—		4	0
Ankaragücü	Total		23	2	3	1	0	0	26	3
Sivasspor	2024–25	Süper Lig	27	4	1	0	—		28	4
Apollon Limassol	2025–26	Cypriot First Division	31	6	5	0	—		36	6
Apollon Limassol	2026–27	Cypriot First Division	4	3	0	0	2	1	6	4
Apollon Limassol	Total		35	9	5	0	2	1	42	10
Career total			371	74	47	11	36	6	454	91

=== International ===
As of match played 29 September 2026

Appearances and goals by national team and year
National team	Year	Apps	Goals
Cape Verde	2013	1	0
Cape Verde	2014	6	1
Cape Verde	2015	7	1
Cape Verde	2016	4	0
Cape Verde	2017	5	2
Cape Verde	2018	3	0
Cape Verde	2019	2	1
Cape Verde	2020	2	0
Cape Verde	2021	4	1
Cape Verde	2022	7	1
Cape Verde	2023	5	0
Cape Verde	2024	7	1
Cape Verde	2025	5	1
Cape Verde	2026	7	1
Total		65	10

Scores and results list Cape Verde's goal tally first, score column indicates score after each Rodrigues goal.

List of international goals scored by Garry Rodrigues
No.	Date	Venue	Opponent	Score	Result	Competition	Ref.
1	6 September 2014	Stade Général Seyni Kountché, Niamey, Niger	Niger	1–0	3–1	2015 Africa Cup of Nations qualification	
2	13 June 2015	Estádio da Várzea, Praia, Cape Verde	São Tomé and Príncipe	3–0	7–1	2017 Africa Cup of Nations qualification	
3	5 September 2017	Moses Mabhida Stadium, Durban, South Africa	South Africa	1–0	2–1	2018 FIFA World Cup qualification	
4	5 September 2017	Moses Mabhida Stadium, Durban, South Africa	South Africa	2–0	2–1	2018 FIFA World Cup qualification	
5	18 November 2019	Estádio Nacional de Cabo Verde, Praia, Cape Verde	Mozambique	1–0	2–2	2021 Africa Cup of Nations qualification	
6	7 October 2021	Accra Sports Stadium, Accra, Ghana	Liberia	2–1	2–1	2022 FIFA World Cup qualification	
7	17 January 2022	Olembe Stadium, Yaoundé, Cameroon	Cameroon	1–1	1–1	2022 Africa Cup of Nations	
8	14 January 2024	Felix Houphouet Boigny Stadium, Abidjan, Ivory Coast	Ghana	2–1	2–1	2023 Africa Cup of Nations	
9	17 November 2025	Hazza bin Zayed Stadium, Al Ain, United Arab Emirates	Egypt	1–0	1–1 (2–0 p)	2025 Al Ain International Cup	
10	6 June 2026	Pratt & Whitney Stadium at Rentschler Field, East Hartford, United States	Bermuda	2–0	3–0	Friendly	

== Honours ==
Levski Sofia

- Bulgarian Cup runner-up: 2012–13

Galatasaray

- Süper Lig: 2017–18

Olympiacos

- Super League Greece: 2021–22

Individual

- Super League Greece Team of the Season: 2015–16
- Süper Lig Team of the Season: 2017–18
