= Abdulrahman Al-Yami =

Saudi Arabian footballer

Personal information
- Full name: Abdulrahman Hashim Al-Yami
- Date of birth: 19 June 1997 (age 29)
- Place of birth: Riyadh, Saudi Arabia
- Height: 1.72 m (5 ft 8 in)
- Position: Striker

Team information
- Current team: Radwa

Youth career
- –2018: Al-Hilal

Senior career*
Years	Team	Apps	(Gls)
2018–2019	Al-Hilal	0	(0)
2018–2019	→ Al-Fayha (loan)	8	(1)
2019–2020	Al-Hazem	9	(3)
2020–2022	Al-Ittihad	6	(0)
2022	Damac	7	(0)
2022–2024	Al-Riyadh	13	(0)
2024–2025	Ohod	12	(2)
2025–2026	Arar		
2026–	Radwa		

International career^{‡}
2016–2018	Saudi Arabia U20	9	(6)
2019–2021	Saudi Arabia U23		
2017–2018	Saudi Arabia	1	(0)
- * Club domestic league appearances and goals as of 13 March 2020 ‡ National team caps and goals as of 26 January 2020

Abdulrahman Hashim Al-Yami (Arabic: عَبْد الرَّحْمٰن هَاشِم الْيَامِي; born 19 June 1997) is a Saudi Arabian professional footballer who plays as a striker for Saudi club Radwa.

== Career ==
Al-Yami is an academy graduate of Al-Hilal. He signed his first professional contract with the club on August 13, 2017. On July 8, 2018, Al-Yami was sent on loan to fellow Pro League side Al-Fayha for the 2018–19 season. On 23 January 2019, Al-Yami's loan was ended early and he returned to Al-Hilal. He made 8 appearances for Al-Fayha and scored once against Ohod in a 3–0 win.

Following his return to Al-Hilal, Al-Yami was included in the 2019 AFC Champions League squad. He made his first appearance since his return by coming off the bench against Al Ain in a 1–0 win. He made two further bench appearances and started the 2019 King Cup semi-final loss against Al-Taawoun.

On 19 July 2019, Al-Yami signed a three-year contract with Al-Hazem. He made his debut for Al-Hazem by coming off the bench in the 89th minute in a 1–1 draw against Al-Taawoun. On 29 August 2019, Al-Yami scored his first goal for Al-Hazem in a 2–1 loss against former club Al-Fayha.

On 9 January 2022, Al-Yami joined Damac on an 18-month contract. On 8 September 2022, Al-Yami joined First Division side Al-Riyadh. On 31 January 2024, Al-Yami joined Ohod. On 26 September 2025, Al-Yami joined Arar.

== Career statistics ==
=== Club ===
As of match played 9 January 2022

Club	Season	League		Cup		Continental		Other		Total	
Club	Season	Apps	Goals	Apps	Goals	Apps	Goals	Apps	Goals	Apps	Goals
Al-Hilal	2017–18	0	0	0	0	0	0	2 (Note: Appearances in Arab Club Championship)	1	2	1
Al-Hilal	2018–19	0	0	2	0	2	0	0	0	4	0
Al-Hilal	Total	0	0	2	0	2	0	2	1	6	1
Al-Fayha (loan)	2018–19	8	1	0	0	—		—		8	1
Al-Hazem	2019–20	9	3	0	0	—		—		9	3
Al-Ittihad	2020–21	4	0	1	0	—		1	0	6	0
Al-Ittihad	2021–22	2	0	0	0	—		0	0	2	0
Al-Ittihad	Total	6	0	1	0	0	0	1	0	8	0
Career totals		23	4	3	0	2	0	3	1	31	5
