= Ahmed Hegazi =

Egyptian footballer (born 1991)

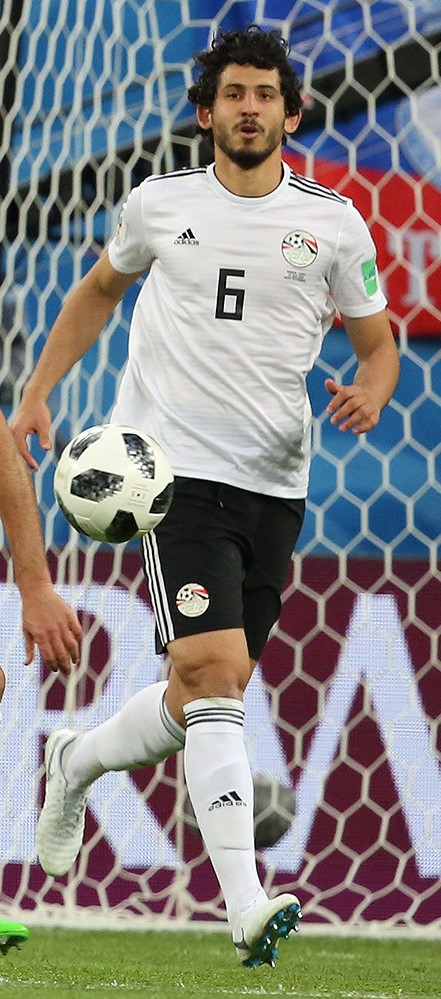
- Hegazi with Egypt in 2018

Personal information
- Full name: Ahmed Elsayed Ali Elsayed Hegazy
- Date of birth: 25 January 1991 (age 35)
- Place of birth: Ismailia, Egypt
- Height: 1.93 m (6 ft 4 in)
- Position: Centre-back

Youth career
- Ismaily

Senior career*
Years	Team	Apps	(Gls)
2009–2012	Ismaily	28	(0)
2012–2015	Fiorentina	3	(0)
2015	→ Perugia (loan)	10	(0)
2015–2017	Al Ahly	40	(1)
2017	→ West Bromwich Albion (loan)	21	(1)
2017–2021	West Bromwich Albion	72	(3)
2020–2021	→ Al-Ittihad (loan)	26	(2)
2021–2024	Al-Ittihad	82	(9)
2024–2026	Neom	51	(1)
Total		333	(17)

International career^{‡}
2009–2011	Egypt U20	13	(5)
2011–2014	Egypt U23	3	(0)
2021	Egypt Olympic (O.P.)	4	(0)
2011–2024	Egypt	88	(1)
Medal record
Representing Egypt
Men's football
Africa Cup of Nations
Runner-up	2017 Gabon
- * Club domestic league appearances and goals as of 11:59, 1 June 2026 (UTC) ‡ National team caps and goals as of 11:59, 1 June 2026 (UTC)

Ahmed Elsayed Ali Elsayed Hegazy (Arabic: أَحْمَد السَّيِّد عَلِيّ السَّيِّد حِجَازِيّ; born 25 January 1991), simply known as Ahmed Hegazi, is an Egyptian former professional footballer who played as a centre-back.

Hegazi has played for the senior Egyptian national team since 2011; during this period, his only absences from the squad have been due to injury. He has represented Egypt in the 2009 FIFA U-20 World Cup, 2011 African U-20 Championship, 2011 FIFA U-20 World Cup, the 2012 Summer Olympics, 2017 Africa Cup of Nations and the 2018 FIFA World Cup. In 2017, he was included in the 2017 Africa Cup of Nations CAF Team of the tournament due to his impressive performances.

== Club career ==
=== Ismaily ===
Hegazi's professional playing career began on 24 November 2009, when he made his debut with Egyptian Premier League club Ismaily playing as a full back.

=== Fiorentina ===
On 22 December 2011, the Egyptian club announced having made a deal with Italian side Fiorentina in exchange for €1.5 million. The Egyptian company received a 15% sell on fee. Hegazi was given the number 3 shirt at Fiorentina. He made his unofficial debut for the club playing 30 minutes in a friendly against Viareggio.

On 18 November 2012, he played 15 minutes in his official debut against Atalanta and scored his first goal for La Viola later that month in the second half of a Coppa Italia match against Juve Stabia on 28 November. On 12 December, Fiorentina announced that Hegazi had completed surgery after sustaining a severe leg injury in training. The club also announced that he had undergone reconstructive surgery on his anterior cruciate ligament. The expected recovery period before the player could return to sports activity was 5–6 months.

In September 2013, he suffered another blow as he injured the same ligament again in training and took him out for six months making him miss most of the season.

On 8 December 2014, Fiorentina announced that the player would be released in January 2015, along with Octávio, Mounir El Hamdaoui, Oleksandr Iakovenko and Joshua Brillante.

==== Perugia loan ====
On 2 February 2015, Hegazi joined Serie B side Perugia on loan for the rest of 2014–15 Serie B. He made his debut for the club in a 3–1 loss to Vicenza, playing the whole 90 minutes. It was his first complete match in Italy.

=== Al Ahly SC ===
On 1 September 2015, Hegazi joined Egyptian Premier League side Al Ahly of Cairo on a five-year contract. With Al Ahly, Hegazi won the Egyptian Premier League: 2015–16, 2016–17, Egypt Cup : 2016–17 and Egyptian Super Cup: 2015.

=== West Bromwich Albion ===
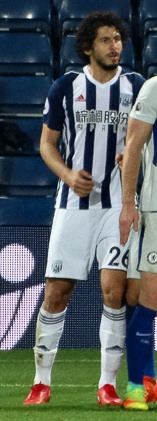
Hegazi playing for West Bromwich Albion in 2017

On 17 July 2017, Hegazi joined Premier League side West Bromwich Albion on loan from Al Ahly until the end of the 2017–18 season, with Albion holding an option to trigger a permanent transfer. Hegazi made his Premier League debut for West Brom on 12 August, scoring a headed goal in a 1–0 win against AFC Bournemouth and winning the man of the match award.

In the following match he received the award for the second time in a row, as West Brom defeated hosts Burnley and made their best start to a top flight campaign since the 1978–79 season. On 18 December 2017, West Brom exercised the option to sign Hegazi permanently, however he could not help save the club from relegation, ending their eight-year stay in the Premier League. Hegazi made 38 league appearances in the 2018/19 season and scored his only goal in a 2–1 win away at Swansea. West Brom went on to lose to local rivals Aston Villa in the Championship play-off semi final. In July 2019, after undergoing ankle surgery, it was announced that he would miss the first few weeks of the 2019–20 season.

==== Al-Ittihad (loan) ====
On 26 October 2020, Hegazi joined Saudi Pro League club Al-Ittihad on loan from West Bromwich Albion until the end of the 2020–21 season.

=== Al-Ittihad ===
After the 2020–21 season, Hegazi joined Al-Ittihad permanently. In the 2022–23 season, Hegazi won Al-Ittihad's first ever Saudi Super Cup. He also helped the club win their ninth league title, refusing to leave the pitch after an injury during the title-winning game of the season.

=== Neom ===
On 21 July 2024, Hegazi joined Saudi First Division League club Neom on a two-year deal.

== International career ==
Hegazi made his international debut with the senior Egypt national team in an away game against Sierra Leone in 2011 when he was only 20 years and 7 months old.

Ever since he has been a regular on the national team and has only missed games due to injury; in December 2016 Héctor Cúper, the Egypt national football team coach included him in the squad to compete in the 2017 Africa Cup of Nations. Hegazi was a regular in the back four during the tournament, playing every single minute and displaying a solid performance as the Egyptians went all the way to the final. His performance earned him an inclusion in the CAF Team of the tournament.

CAF included Ahmed Hegazi and Mohamed Salah in the 2018 World Cup qualifiers Best XI.

Hegazi played a crucial role for Egypt during the 2018 FIFA World Cup, where he helped Egypt reach the group stage. His standout performance against Uruguay, where he effectively neutralized key attackers, highlighted his defensive prowess.

On 17 November 2020, during the 2021 Africa Cup of Nations qualifiers, Hegazi captained the Egypt national team for the first time, playing 90 minutes in a 1–3 away win against Togo.

== Career statistics ==
=== Club ===
As of match played 18 May 2025

Appearances and goals by club, season and competition
Club	Season	Division	League		National cup (Note: Includes Egypt Cup, Coppa Italia, FA Cup, King Cup)		League cup (Note: Includes EFL Cup)		Continental		Other		Total	
Club	Season	Division	Apps	Goals	Apps	Goals	Apps	Goals	Apps	Goals	Apps	Goals	Apps	Goals
Ismaily	2009–10	Egyptian Premier League	12	0	1	0	—		3 (Note: Appearances in CAF Champions League)	0	—		16	0
Ismaily	2010–11	Egyptian Premier League	7	0	3	0	—		0	0	—		10	0
Ismaily	2011–12	Egyptian Premier League	9	0	0	0	—		—		—		9	0
Ismaily	Total		28	0	4	0	—		3	0	—		35	0
Fiorentina	2012–13	Serie A	2	0	1	1	—		—		—		3	1
Fiorentina	2013–14	Serie A	1	0	0	0	—		0	0	—		1	0
Fiorentina	Total		3	0	1	1	—		0	0	—		4	1
Perugia Calcio (loan)	2014–15	Serie B	10	0	0	0	—		—		—		10	0
Al Ahly	2015–16	Egyptian Premier League	29	0	1	0	—		8	1	1 (Note: Appearance in Egyptian Super Cup)	0	39	1
Al Ahly	2016–17	Egyptian Premier League	11	0	3	0	—		6	1	1	0	21	1
Al Ahly	Total		40	0	4	0	—		14	2	2	0	60	2
West Bromwich Albion	2017–18	Premier League	38	2	3	0	1	0	—		—		42	2
West Bromwich Albion	2018–19	Championship	38	1	0	0	2	0	—		—		40	1
West Bromwich Albion	2019–20	Championship	16	1	2	0	0	0	—		—		18	1
West Bromwich Albion	2020–21	Premier League	1	0	0	0	0	0	—		—		1	0
West Bromwich Albion	Total		93	4	5	0	3	0	—		—		101	4
Al-Ittihad	2020–21	Saudi Pro League	26	2	2	1	—		—		2 (Note: Appearances in Arab Club Champions Cup)	0	30	3
Al-Ittihad	2021–22	Saudi Pro League	18	3	1	0	—		—		—		19	3
Al-Ittihad	2022–23	Saudi Pro League	28	4	3	0	—		—		2 (Note: Appearances in Saudi Super Cup)	0	33	4
Al-Ittihad	2023–24	Saudi Pro League	10	0	2	2	—		5 (Note: Appearances in AFC Champions League)	0	4 (Note: Two appearances in FIFA Club World Cup, two appearances in Saudi Super Cup)	0	21	2
Al-Ittihad	Total		82	9	8	3	—		5	0	8	0	103	12
Neom	2024–25	Saudi First Division League	23	0	—		—		—		—		23	0
Career total			279	13	22	4	3	0	22	2	10	0	336	19

=== International ===
As of match played 28 January 2024

Appearances and goals by national team and year
National team	Year	Apps	Goals
Egypt
Egypt	2011	3	0
Egypt	2012	12	0
Egypt	2013	4	1
Egypt	2015	7	0
Egypt	2016	5	0
Egypt	2017	11	0
Egypt	2018	9	1
Egypt	2019	8	0
Egypt	2020	2	0
Egypt	2021	12	0
Egypt	2022	8	0
Egypt	2023	2	0
Egypt	2024	5	0
Total		88	2

As of match played 28 January 2024
Egypt score listed first, score column indicates score after each Hegazi goal

List of international goals scored by Ahmed Hegazi
No.	Date	Venue	Cap	Opponent	Score	Result	Competition	Ref.
1	4 June 2013	30 June Stadium, Cairo, Egypt	16	Botswana	1–1	1–1	Friendly	
2	16 October 2018	Mavuso Sports Centre, Manzini, Swaziland	50	Eswatini	1–0	2–0	2019 Africa Cup of Nations qualification	

== Honours ==
Al Ahly

- Egyptian Premier League: 2015–16, 2016–17
- Egypt Cup : 2016–17
- Egyptian Super Cup: 2015

Al-Ittihad

- Saudi Pro League: 2022–23
- Saudi Super Cup: 2022

Egypt

- Africa Cup of Nations runner-up: 2017

Individual

- Africa Cup of Nations Team of the Tournament: 2017
- Saudi Pro League Player of the Month: August 2021
