= Al-Ittihad Club Stadium =

Multi-purpose stadium in Jeddah, Saudi Arabia

- Interactive map of Al-Ittihad Club Stadium
- Full name: Al-Ittihad Club Stadium
- Location: Jeddah, Saudi Arabia
- Coordinates: 21°32′32.983″N 39°12′44.751″E
- Owner: Saudi Arabian Football Federation (SAFF)
- Operator: Al-Ittihad
- Capacity: 15,000
- Surface: Grass

Construction
- Opened: 1983

Tenants
- Al-Ittihad (youth); Al-Ittihad (women) (2022-present)

Al-Ittihad Club Stadium (Arabic: ملعب نادي الاتحاد), also known as Prince Faisal bin Fahad Stadium, is a football stadium in Jeddah, Saudi Arabia.

== History ==
The stadium was built and opened in 1984 and was mainly used by Al-Ittihad as a training ground for friendly matches and youth team games. In 2018, the venue underwent renovations that included replacing the playing surface, reconditioning the soil for natural grass, and covering 90% of the track with artificial grass. Modern numbered seats featuring the club's emblem were also installed, along with essential technical maintenance for the first time since its construction.

In April 2021, Al-Ittihad Club Stadium received the top ranking among Prince Mohammed bin Salman Professional League clubs' stadiums. Since 2022, the stadium has served as Al-Ittihad's women section home stadium.
