= Maurício Antônio =

Brazilian footballer (born 1992)

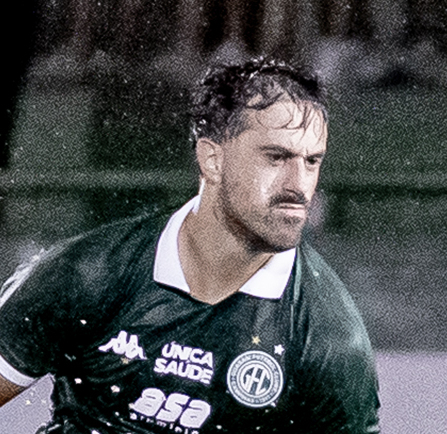
- Maurício Antônio playing for Guarani in 2026

Personal information
- Full name: Maurício de Carvalho Antônio
- Date of birth: 6 February 1992 (age 34)
- Place of birth: São Paulo, Brazil
- Height: 1.83 m (6 ft 0 in)
- Position: Centre-back

Team information
- Current team: Guarani
- Number: 2

Youth career
- 2008–2011: São Paulo

Senior career*
Years	Team	Apps	(Gls)
2012	Pelotas	0	(0)
2012	Penapolense	0	(0)
2014	Juventus-SP	13	(0)
2014–2016	Portimonense	41	(3)
2015–2016	→ Porto B (loan)	17	(1)
2016–2017	Marítimo	40	(3)
2017–2021	Urawa Red Diamonds	63	(3)
2020–2021	→ Portimonense (loan)	33	(1)
2021–2023	Al Batin	54	(2)
2023–2024	Coritiba	41	(1)
2025	Paysandu	15	(0)
2026–	Guarani	22	(2)

International career
- Brazil U15
- Brazil U17
- * Club domestic league appearances and goals as of 10 November 2026

Maurício de Carvalho Antônio (born 6 February 1992) is a Brazilian professional footballer who plays as a centre-back for Guarani. With Urawa Red Diamonds, he played in the 2017 FIFA Club World Cup where he was the top goalscorer, alongside Romarinho and Cristiano Ronaldo.

== Club career ==
A product of the São Paulo youth academy, Antônio started his career in the lower divisions of Brazilian football. In 2014, he played for Juventus-SP in Paulista A3. In June of the same year, he signed for Portimonense in Segunda Liga.

Antônio made his first team debut against Covilhã. On 1 October 2014, he scored his first goal for the club as Portimonense defeated Porto B 2–0.

On 1 August 2017, Antônio transferred to Urawa Red Diamonds in Japan. On 30 November, he was named in the side's 23-man squad for the 2017 FIFA Club World Cup. He was the tournament's top goalscorer (alongside Romarinho and Cristiano Ronaldo) despite playing only one game and being eliminated in the second round.

On 4 August 2023, Antônio joined Coritiba.

== Career statistics ==
As of match played 28 October 2024.

Appearances and goals by club, season and competition
Club	Season	League			State League		Cup		League Cup		Continental		Other		Total	
Club	Season	Division	Apps	Goals	Apps	Goals	Apps	Goals	Apps	Goals	Apps	Goals	Apps	Goals	Apps	Goals
Juventus-SP	2013	Paulista	—		18	0	—		—		—		—		18	0
Portimonense	2014–15	Segunda Liga	41	3	—		1	0	2	0	—		—		44	3
Porto B (loan)	2015–16	LigaPro	17	1	—		—		—		—		—		17	1
Marítimo	2015–16	Primeira Liga	12	0	—		—		2	0	—		—		14	0
Marítimo	2016–17	Primeira Liga	28	3	—		1	0	4	0	—		—		33	3
Marítimo	Total		40	3	—		1	0	6	0	—		—		47	3
Urawa Red Diamonds	2017	J1 League	9	1	—		0	0	1	0	5	0	1	0	16	1
Urawa Red Diamonds	2018	J1 League	30	1	—		5	3	2	0	—		1	2	38	6
Urawa Red Diamonds	2019	J1 League	22	1	—		1	0	2	0	7	0	1	0	33	1
Urawa Red Diamonds	2020	J1 League	2	0	—		—		1	0	—		—		3	0
Urawa Red Diamonds	Total		63	3	—		6	3	6	0	12	0	3	2	90	8
Portimonense	2020–21	Primeira Liga	33	1	—		1	0	—		—		—		34	1
Al Batin	2021–22	Saudi Pro League	29	2	—		2	0	—		—		—		31	2
Al Batin	2022–23	Saudi Pro League	25	0	—		1	0	—		—		—		26	0
Al Batin	Total		54	2	—		3	0	—		—		—		57	2
Coritiba	2023	Série A	3	0	—		—		—		—		—		3	0
Coritiba	2024	Série B	25	0	13	1	0	0	—		—		—		38	1
Coritiba	Total		28	0	13	1	0	0	—		—		—		41	1
Total			276	13	31	1	12	3	14	0	12	0	3	2	348	19

^{1}Includes Suruga Bank Championship, FIFA Club World Cup, and Japanese Super Cup.

== Honours ==
=== Club ===
Urawa Red Diamonds

- AFC Champions League: 2017

São Paulo U20

- Copa São Paulo de Futebol Júnior: 2010
