= Palestina, São Paulo =

Palestina
- Municipality
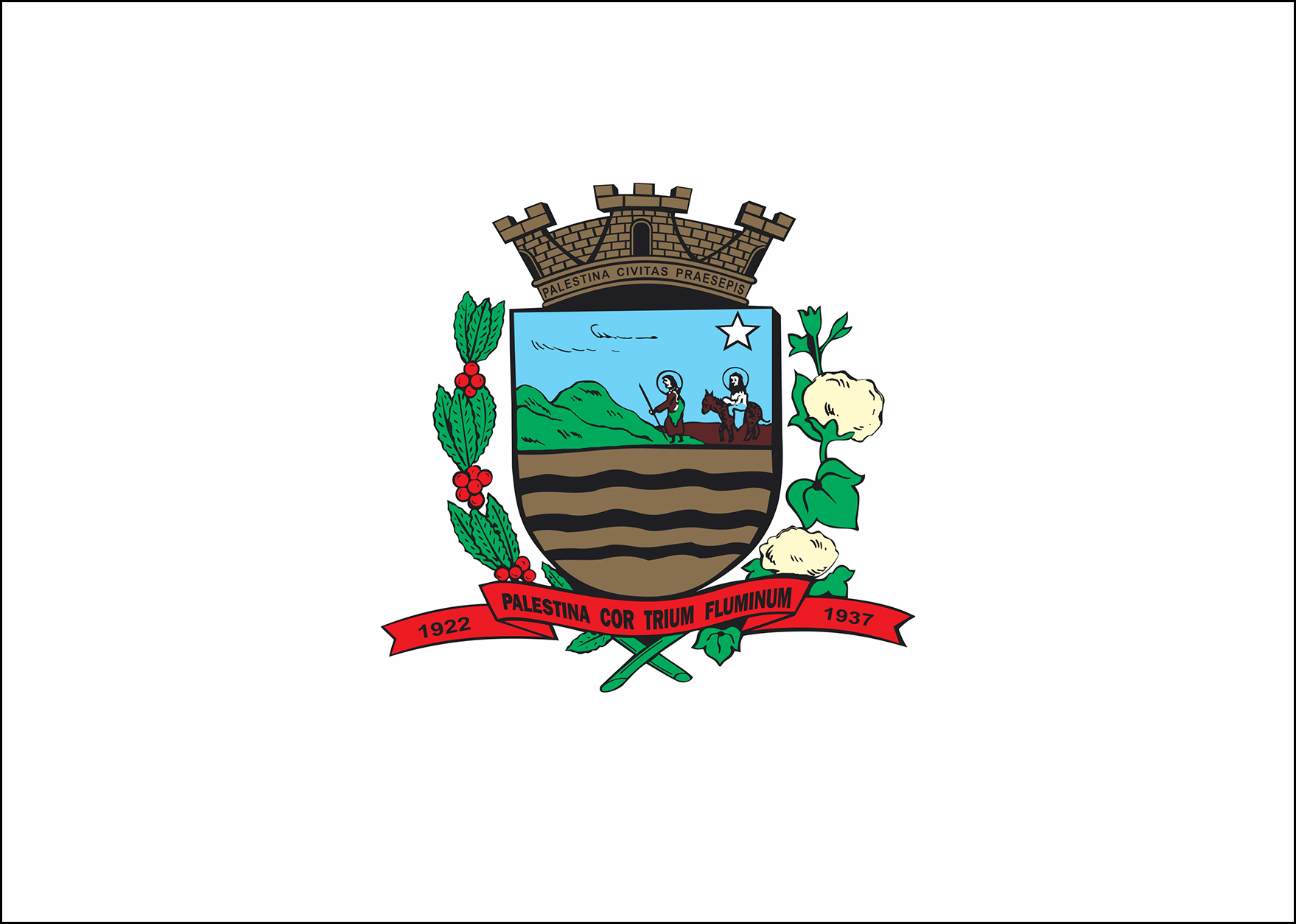
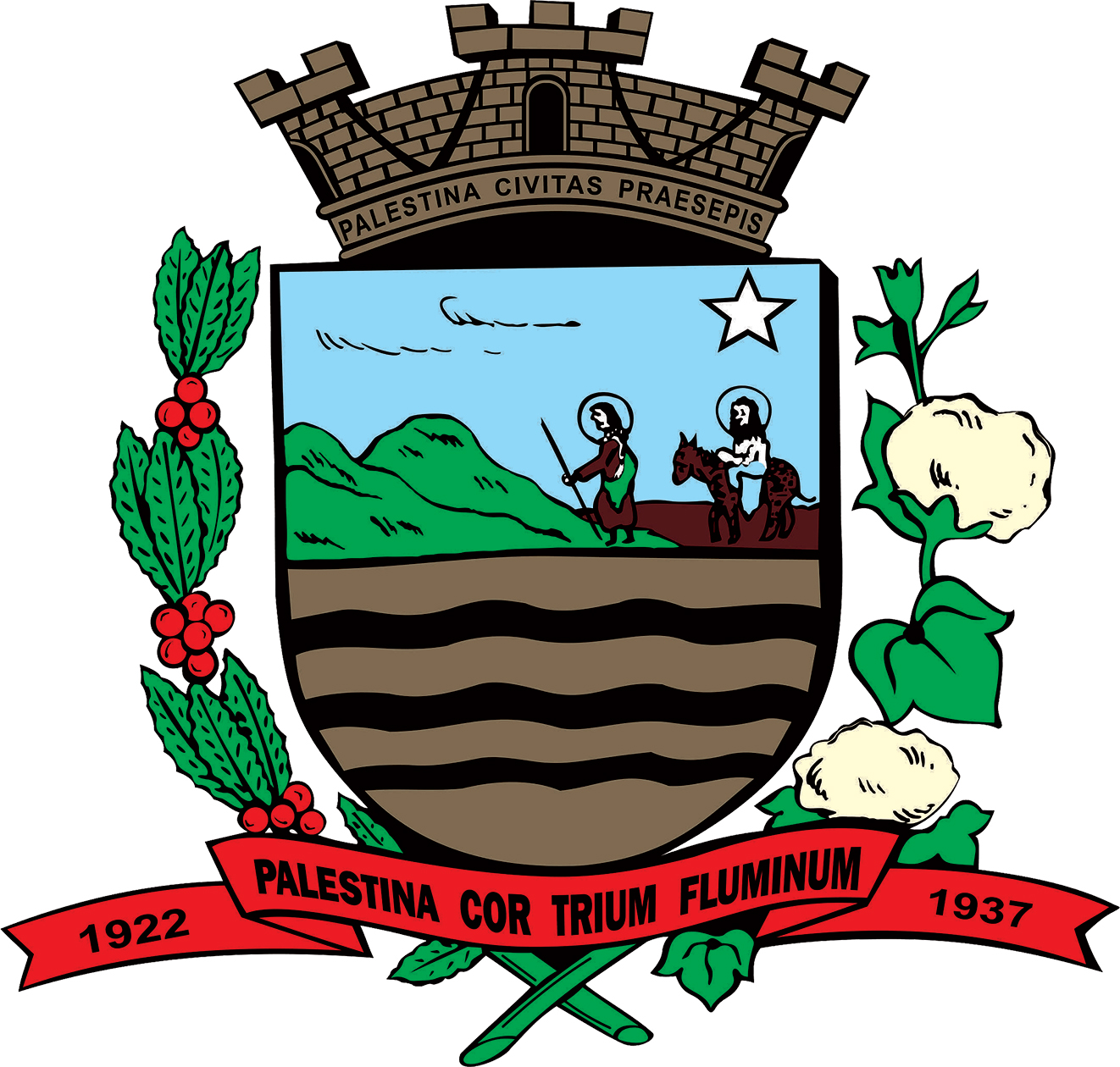
- Flag Coat of arms

- Location in São Paulo state

- Location in Brazil
- Coordinates: 20°23′24″S 49°25′59″W
- Country: Brazil
- Region: Southeast
- State: São Paulo

Area
  - Total: 696.6 km^{2} (269.0 sq mi)
- Elevation: 550 m (1,800 ft)

Population (2020)
  - Total: 13,123
  - Density: 18.84/km^{2} (48.79/sq mi)
- Time zone: UTC−3 (BRT)
- Postal code: 15470-000
- Area code: +55 17
- Website: Prefecture of Palestina

Palestina (lit. Palestine) is a municipality (município) in the state of São Paulo, Brazil. The population is 13,123 (2020 est.) in an area of 696.6 km^{2}.

Palestina belongs to the Mesoregion of São José do Rio Preto.

== Economy ==
The Tertiary sector corresponds to 59,08% of the Palestina GDP. The Secondary sector is 6.47% of the GDP. The Primary sector is relevant, with 34.4% of the city GDP.

== Media ==
In telecommunications, the city was served by Telecomunicações de São Paulo. In July 1998, this company was acquired by Telefónica, which adopted the Vivo brand in 2012. The company is currently an operator of cell phones, fixed lines, internet (fiber optics/4G) and television (satellite and cable).

== See also ==
- List of municipalities in São Paulo
- Interior of São Paulo
