= Abdulmohsen Fallatah =

Saudi Arabian football player

Personal information
- Full name: Abdulmohsen Yasseen Mohammed Fallatah
- Date of birth: June 14, 1994 (age 32)
- Place of birth: Mecca, Saudi Arabia
- Position: Center back

Team information
- Current team: Al-Wehda
- Number: 14

Youth career
- Al-Wehda

Senior career*
Years	Team	Apps	(Gls)
2015–2016	Al-Wehda	5	(0)
2016–2019	Al-Qadisiyah	62	(7)
2019–2022	Al-Ittihad	9	(1)
2022–2024	Al-Tai	3	(0)
2025–	Al-Wehda	0	(0)

International career
2016–2017	Saudi Arabia U23		
- * Club domestic league appearances and goals

Abdulmohsen Yasseen Mohammed Fallatah (Arabic: عبد المحسن فلاته, born 14 June 1994) is a Saudi Arabian professional footballer who plays as a center back for Al-Wehda.

== Career ==
On 6 July 2022, Fallatah joined Al-Tai on a free transfer following the expiration of his contract with Al-Ittihad. In September 2025, Fallatah joined Al-Wehda.
