= Abdulaziz Al-Bishi =

Saudi Arabian footballer (born 1994)

Personal information
- Full name: Abdulaziz Ali Mohammed Al-Bishi
- Date of birth: 11 March 1994 (age 32)
- Place of birth: Baish, Saudi Arabia
- Height: 1.73 m (5 ft 8 in)
- Position: Winger

Team information
- Current team: Al Faisaly
- Number: 24

Youth career
- –2013: Hetten
- 2013–2015: Al-Shabab

Senior career*
Years	Team	Apps	(Gls)
2015–2018	Al-Shabab	38	(3)
2017–2018	→ Al-Taawoun (loan)	14	(1)
2018–2019	Al-Faisaly	13	(2)
2019–2026	Al-Ittihad	138	(9)
2023–2024	→ Damac (loan)	16	(0)
2026–	Al Faisaly	7	(0)

International career^{‡}
2014–2017	Saudi Arabia U23		
2018–2023	Saudi Arabia	22	(1)
- * Club domestic league appearances and goals as of 20:49, 31 October 2026 (UTC) ‡ National team caps and goals as of 20:38, 12 September 2023 (UTC)

Abdulaziz Ali Mohammed Al-Bishi (Arabic: عبد العزيز البيشي; born 11 March 1994) is a Saudi Arabian professional footballer who plays as a winger for Saudi Pro League club Al Faisaly.

== Career ==
On 24 January 2019, Al-Bishi joined Al-Ittihad on a three-year deal.

On 11 July 2023, he joined Damac on loan from Al-Ittihad. He has represented Saudi Arabia at the U23 level and in the senior national team.

== Career statistics ==
=== International ===
Statistics accurate as of match played 12 September 2023.

Saudi Arabia
Year	Apps	Goals
2018	5	1
2019	10	0
2020	0	0
2021	0	0
2022	4	0
2023	3	0
Total	22	1

Scores and results list Saudi Arabia's goal tally first.

List of international goals scored by Abdulaziz Al-Bishi
No.	Date	Venue	Opponent	Score	Result	Competition
1.	15 October 2018	King Saud University Stadium, Riyadh, Saudi Arabia	Iraq	1–1	1–1	2018 Superclásico Championship

== Honours ==
Al-Ittihad

- Saudi Pro League: 2022–23, 2024–25
- King's Cup: 2024–25
- Saudi Super Cup: 2022
