= Abdulmajeed Al-Zahrani =

Saudi Arabian footballer

Abdulmajeed Al-Zahrani عبد المجيد الزهراني
Personal information
- Full name: Abdulmajeed Al-Zahrani
- Date of birth: 1 July 1999 (age 27)
- Place of birth: Saudi Arabia
- Position: Midfielder

Youth career
- Al-Ittihad

Senior career*
Years	Team	Apps	(Gls)
2020–2022	Al-Ittihad	1	(0)
2021	→ Ohod (loan)	5	(0)
2021–2022	→ Jeddah (loan)	0	(0)
2022	→ Al-Okhdood (loan)	0	(0)
2022–2023	Al-Ain	7	(0)
2023–2024	Al-Nahda		
2024–2025	Qilwah		
- * Club domestic league appearances and goals

Abdulmajeed Al-Zahrani (Arabic: عبد المجيد الزهراني; born 1 July 1999) is a Saudi Arabian professional footballer who plays as a midfielder.

== Career ==
Al-Zahrani started his career at the youth team of Al-Ittihad and represented the club at every level, he was chosen in the Saudi program to develop football talents established by General Sports Authority in Saudi Arabia. On 29 January 2021, Al-Zahrani joined Ohod on loan until the end of the season. On 18 July 2021, he joined Jeddah on loan. The loan was cut short and on 31 January 2022 Al-Zahrani joined Al-Okhdood on loan. On 21 August 2022, Al-Zahrani joined Al-Ain on a permanent deal. On 21 October 2024, Al-Zahrani joined Third Division side Qilwah.
