= Saher Al-Suraihi =

Saudi Arabian footballer

Saher Al-Suraihi ساهر السريحي
Personal information
- Full name: Saher Saad Al-Suraihi
- Date of birth: April 29, 1998 (age 28)
- Place of birth: Saudi Arabia
- Height: 1.66 m (5 ft 5 in)
- Position: Winger

Youth career
- –2018: Al-Ittihad

Senior career*
Years	Team	Apps	(Gls)
2018–2022	Al-Ittihad	1	(0)
2019–2020	→ Al-Nojoom (loan)		
2020	→ Al-Thoqbah (loan)	10	(0)
2020–2021	→ Jeddah (loan)	2	(0)
2021–2022	→ Al-Kawkab (loan)	7	(0)
2025	Al-Muzahimiyyah	1	(0)
- * Club domestic league appearances and goals as of 15 May 2020

Saher Al-Suraihi (Arabic: ساهر السريحي, born 29 April 1998) is a Saudi Arabian professional footballer who plays as a winger.

== Career ==
Al-Suraihi started his career at the youth team of Al-Ittihad. He signed his first professional contract with Al-Ittihad on July 5, 2017 . He made his professional debut for Al-Ittihad against Al-Raed the Pro League, replacing Mohammed Reeman on April 18, 2018 . and he signed contract with Al-Nojoom on loan from Al-Ittihad on August 31, 2019 . His loan to Al-Nojoom was canceled and he signed contract with Al-Thoqbah on loan from Al-Ittihad on January 31, 2020, he signed contract with Jeddah on loan from Al-Ittihad on October 11, 2020 . On 17 August 2021, Al-Suraihi joined Al-Kawkab on loan.
