= Hazim Al-Zahrani =

Saudi Arabian footballer

Hazim Al-Zahrani حازم الزهراني
Personal information
- Full name: Hazim Hassan Al-Zahrani
- Date of birth: 23 April 1999 (age 27)
- Place of birth: Saudi Arabia
- Height: 1.71 m (5 ft 7 in)
- Position: Left-back

Team information
- Current team: Abha
- Number: 24

Youth career
- Al-Ittihad

Senior career*
Years	Team	Apps	(Gls)
2020–2023	Al-Ittihad	5	(0)
2022–2023	→ Al-Khaleej (loan)	5	(0)
2023	→ Ohod (loan)	9	(2)
2023–2025	Al-Safa	28	(3)
2025–	Abha	0	(0)

International career
2017–2019	Saudi Arabia U20		
2021–2022	Saudi Arabia U23		
- * Club domestic league appearances and goals as of 27 August 2021

Hazim Al-Zahrani (Arabic: حازم الزهراني; born 23 April 1999) is a Saudi Arabian professional footballer who plays as a left-back for Abha.

== Career ==
Al-Zahrani started his career at Al-Ittihad's youth team. On 30 June 2019, Al-Zahrani was chosen in the Saudi program to develop football talents established by General Sports Authority in Saudi Arabia. He was sent on a one-year scholarship program in Spain. On 23 July 2019, Al-Zahrani signed his first professional contract with the Al-Ittihad. He was promoted to the first team after he returned from the scholarship program during the 2020–21 season. On 27 August 2021, Al-Zahrani made his professional debut for Al-Ittihad against Al-Faisaly in the Pro League, replacing Karim El Ahmadi. On 2 August 2022, Al-Zahrani joined Al-Khaleej on a season-long loan. On 28 January 2023, Al-Khaleej announced that they had ended Al-Zahrani's loan early. On 28 January 2023, Al-Zahrani joined First Division side Ohod on a six-month loan. On 16 September 2023, Al-Zahrani joined Al-Safa. On 10 September 2025, Al-Zahrani joined Abha.

== Honours ==
Saudi Arabia U20

- AFC U-19 Championship: 2018
