= 2024–25 Al-Shabab FC season =

Al-Shabab
2024–25 season
- President: Mohammed Al-Munajem
- Manager: Vítor Pereira (until 19 December); Fatih Terim (from 27 December)
- Stadium: Al-Shabab Club Stadium
- Pro League: 6th
- King's Cup: Semi-finals (knocked out by Al-Ittihad)
- Top goalscorer: League: Abderrazak Hamdallah (21); All: Abderrazak Hamdallah (24)
- Highest home attendance: 11,557 v Al-Ittihad; 20 May 2025; Saudi Pro League
- Lowest home attendance: 2,377 v Damac; 28 February 2025; Saudi Pro League
- Average home league attendance: 5,243

The 2024–25 season was Al-Shabab's 48th non-consecutive season in the top flight of Saudi football and 78th year in existence as a football club. The club participated in the Pro League and the King's Cup.

The season covers the period from 1 July 2024 to 30 June 2025.

== Players ==
=== Squad information ===
As of 1 February 2025

Note: Flags indicate national team as defined under FIFA eligibility rules; some limited exceptions apply. Players may hold more than one non-FIFA nationality.

No.	Pos.	Nation	Player
2	DF	KSA	Mohammed Al-Shuwayrikh
3	DF	BRA	Leandrinho (on loan from Vasco da Gama)
4	DF	NED	Wesley Hoedt
5	DF	KSA	Nader Al-Sharari
7	MF	ITA	Giacomo Bonaventura
8	MF	KSA	Fahad Al-Muwallad
9	MF	MAR	Abderrazak Hamdallah
10	MF	BEL	Yannick Carrasco (captain)
11	MF	ARG	Cristian Guanca
12	MF	KSA	Majed Kanabah
14	MF	FIN	Glen Kamara (on loan from Rennes)
15	MF	KSA	Musab Al-Juwayr (on loan from Al-Hilal)
16	DF	KSA	Hussain Al-Sibyani
17	MF	KSA	Younes Al-Shanqeeti (on loan from Al-Ahli)
21	MF	KSA	Nawaf Al-Sadi
22	GK	KSA	Mohammed Al-Otaibi

No.	Pos.	Nation	Player
30	DF	BRA	Robert Renan (on loan from Zenit)
31	GK	UKR	Heorhiy Bushchan
33	GK	KSA	Abdullah Al-Mayouf
34	FW	KSA	Hisham Al Dubais
36	DF	KSA	Adel Al-Mutairi
38	DF	KSA	Mohammed Harboush
45	DF	KSA	Amjad Haraj
46	MF	KSA	Emad Qaysi
50	GK	KSA	Mohammed Al-Absi
55	GK	KSA	Mishal Saad
56	MF	POR	Daniel Podence
66	DF	KSA	Nawaf Al-Ghulaimish
70	FW	KSA	Haroune Camara
71	DF	KSA	Mohammed Al-Thani (on loan from Al-Hazem)
77	FW	KSA	Hamad Al-Khurayef
90	FW	KSA	Majed Abdullah

=== Out on loan ===
Note: Flags indicate national team as defined under FIFA eligibility rules; some limited exceptions apply. Players may hold more than one non-FIFA nationality.

No.	Pos.	Nation	Player
13	FW	BRA	Carlos (at Neom until 30 June 2025)
20	FW	SEN	Habib Diallo (at Damac until 30 June 2025)

No.	Pos.	Nation	Player
37	MF	KSA	Abdullah Matuq (at Al-Jandal until 30 June 2025)

== Transfers and loans ==
=== Transfers in ===
Entry date	Position	No.	Player	From club	Fee	Ref.
30 June 2024	DF	2	(Saudi Arabia) Abdullah Al-Rubaie	(Saudi Arabia) Al-Jabalain	End of loan	
30 June 2024	DF	25	(Saudi Arabia) Saeed Al-Rubaie	(Saudi Arabia) Al-Okhdood	End of loan	
30 June 2024	DF	–	(Saudi Arabia) Sultan Al-Enezi	(Saudi Arabia) Al-Zulfi	End of loan	
30 June 2024	MF	85	(Saudi Arabia) Hamad Al-Ghamdi	(Saudi Arabia) Al-Entesar	End of loan	
30 June 2024	MF	11	(Argentina) Cristian Guanca	(Saudi Arabia) Al-Taawoun	End of loan	
30 June 2024	FW	32	(Saudi Arabia) Saad Al-Muwallad	(Saudi Arabia) Al-Faisaly	End of loan	
30 June 2024	FW	34	(Saudi Arabia) Fares Al-Garzae	(Saudi Arabia) Al-Najma	End of loan	
30 June 2024	FW	41	(Saudi Arabia) Dhaidan Al-Mutairi	(Saudi Arabia) Al-Batin	End of loan	
17 July 2024	FW	70	(Saudi Arabia) Haroune Camara	(Saudi Arabia) Al-Ittihad	Free	
23 July 2024	FW	9	(Morocco) Abderrazak Hamdallah	(Saudi Arabia) Al-Ittihad	Free	
5 August 2024	MF	7	(Italy) Giacomo Bonaventura	(Italy) Fiorentina	Free	
23 August 2024	DF	4	(Netherlands) Wesley Hoedt	(England) Watford	Undisclosed	
1 September 2024	GK	33	(Saudi Arabia) Abdullah Al-Mayouf	(Saudi Arabia) Al-Ittihad	Free	
2 September 2024	DF	2	(Saudi Arabia) Mohammed Al-Shuwayrikh	(Saudi Arabia) Al-Riyadh	$2,131,000	
3 September 2024	MF	56	(Portugal) Daniel Podence	(England) Wolverhampton Wanderers	$5,555,000	
1 January 2025	FW	34	(Saudi Arabia) Hisham Al Dubais	(Saudi Arabia) Al-Khaleej	Free	
29 January 2025	GK	31	(Ukraine) Heorhiy Bushchan	(Ukraine) Dynamo Kyiv	$3,120,000	

=== Loans in ===
Start date	End date	Position	No.	Player	From club	Fee	Ref.
23 August 2024	End of season	MF	17	(Saudi Arabia) Younes Al-Shanqiti	(Saudi Arabia) Al-Ahli	None	
1 September 2024	End of season	MF	15	(Saudi Arabia) Musab Al-Juwayr	(Saudi Arabia) Al-Hilal	None	
3 September 2024	End of season	DF	30	(Brazil) Robert Renan	(Russia) Zenit	$3,333,000	
3 September 2024	End of season	FW	71	(Saudi Arabia) Mohammed Al-Thani	(Saudi Arabia) Al-Hazem	None	
29 January 2025	End of season	DF	3	(Brazil) Leandrinho	(Brazil) Vasco da Gama	$500,000	
31 January 2025	End of season	MF	14	(Finland) Glen Kamara	(France) Stade Rennais	None	

=== Transfers out ===
Exit date	Position	No.	Player	To club	Fee	Ref.
30 June 2024	GK	1	(Saudi Arabia) Mustafa Malayekah	(Saudi Arabia) Al-Fateh	End of loan	
30 June 2024	DF	2	(Saudi Arabia) Hamad Al-Yami	(Saudi Arabia) Al-Hilal	End of loan	
30 June 2024	DF	14	(Morocco) Romain Saïss	(Qatar) Al-Sadd	End of loan	
30 June 2024	MF	55	(Saudi Arabia) Musab Al-Juwayr	(Saudi Arabia) Al-Hilal	End of loan	
30 June 2024	FW	31	(Brazil) Vitinho	(Saudi Arabia) Al-Ettifaq	End of loan	
30 June 2024	FW	49	(Saudi Arabia) Abdullah Radif	(Saudi Arabia) Al-Hilal	End of loan	
1 July 2024	DF	25	(Saudi Arabia) Saeed Al-Rubaie	(Saudi Arabia) Al-Okhdood	Free	
1 July 2024	MF	15	(Saudi Arabia) Hussain Al-Qahtani	(Saudi Arabia) Al-Qadsiah	Free	
18 July 2024	MF	26	(Saudi Arabia) Riyadh Sharahili	(Saudi Arabia) Neom	Undisclosed	
21 July 2024	MF	30	(Croatia) Ivan Rakitić	(Croatia) Hajduk Split	Free	
23 July 2024	DF	3	(Saudi Arabia) Khaled Asiri	(Saudi Arabia) Al-Diriyah	Free	
14 August 2024	DF	4	(Brazil) Iago Santos	(United Arab Emirates) Shabab Al Ahli	Free	
16 August 2024	DF	–	(Saudi Arabia) Abdulmajeed Al-Enezi	(Saudi Arabia) Al-Ain	Free	
20 August 2024	MF	19	(Saudi Arabia) Mohammed Eisa	(Saudi Arabia) Al-Hazem	Free	
1 September 2024	DF	24	(Saudi Arabia) Moteb Al-Harbi	(Saudi Arabia) Al-Hilal	$32,000,000	
2 September 2024	DF	–	(Saudi Arabia) Saad Al-Qahtani	(Saudi Arabia) Al-Wehda	Free	
2 September 2024	MF	28	(Saudi Arabia) Nasser Al-Bishi	(Saudi Arabia) Al-Riyadh	Free	
3 September 2024	MF	11	(Saudi Arabia) Hattan Bahebri	(Saudi Arabia) Al-Taawoun	Free	
10 September 2024	FW	32	(Saudi Arabia) Saad Al-Muwallad	(Saudi Arabia) Al-Jeel	Free	
15 September 2024	MF	–	(Saudi Arabia) Ammar Al-Khaibari	(Saudi Arabia) Al-Zulfi	Free	
16 September 2024	MF	43	(Saudi Arabia) Moayed Al-Shuwayfie	(Saudi Arabia) Al-Jeel	Free	
25 September 2024	DF	2	(Saudi Arabia) Abdullah Al-Rubaie	(Saudi Arabia) Al-Jeel	Free	
21 October 2024	MF	85	(Saudi Arabia) Hamad Al-Ghamdi	(Saudi Arabia) Qilwah	Free	
16 January 2025	MF	6	(Colombia) Gustavo Cuéllar	(Brazil) Grêmio	Free	
2 February 2025	GK	60	(Saudi Arabia) Mohammed Al-Hakim	(Saudi Arabia) Neom	Free	

=== Loans out ===
Start date	End date	Position	No.	Player	To club	Fee	Ref.
26 August 2024	End of season	FW	20	(Senegal) Habib Diallo	(Saudi Arabia) Damac	None	
2 September 2024	End of season	FW	13	(Brazil) Carlos	(Saudi Arabia) Neom	None	
13 September 2024	End of season	FW	37	(Saudi Arabia) Abdullah Matuq	(Saudi Arabia) Al-Jandal	None	

== Pre-season ==
26 July 2024 Friendly	Al-Shabab (Saudi Arabia)	0–2	(Spain) Tenerife	Santa Cruz de Tenerife, Spain
18:00 WEST		Report	Williams 17'; Cruz 22'	Stadium: Ciudad Deportiva de Tenerife Javier Pérez

2 August 2024 Friendly	Al-Shabab (Saudi Arabia)	1–2	(Spain) Las Palmas	La Orotava, Spain
13:00 WEST	Carrasco 86'	Report	Muñoz 45+2'; Januzaj 47'	Stadium: Estadio Municipal Los Cuartos

7 August 2024 Friendly	Al-Shabab (Saudi Arabia)	3–3	(Spain) Tenerife B	Santa Cruz de Tenerife, Spain
19:00 WEST	Carrasco 61'; Guanca 72'; Camara 81'	Report	González; Sabina,	Stadium: Ciudad Deportiva de Tenerife Javier Pérez

15 August 2024 Friendly	Al-Shabab (Saudi Arabia)	2–0	(Saudi Arabia) Al-Fayha	Riyadh, Saudi Arabia
19:30 AST	Hamdallah 36'; Carrasco 37'	Report		Stadium: Al-Shabab Club Stadium

== Competitions ==
=== Overview ===
Competition	Record							
Competition	Pld	W	D	L	GF	GA	GD	Win %
Pro League	34	18	6	10	65	41	+24	52.94
King Cup	4	3	0	1	9	5	+4	75.00
Total	38	21	6	11	74	46	+28	55.26

Updated to match played 26 May 2025
Source: Competitions

=== Pro League ===
==== League table ====
Pos	Team	Pld	W	D	L	GF	GA	GD	Pts	Qualification or relegation
4	Al-Qadsiah	34	21	5	8	53	31	+22	68	
5	Al-Ahli	34	21	4	9	69	36	+33	67	Qualification for AFC Champions League Elite League stage (Note: By virtue of winning 2024–25 AFC Champions League Elite.)
6	Al-Shabab	34	18	6	10	65	41	+24	60	Qualification for the AGCFF Gulf Club Champions League group stage (Note: Al-Qadsiah withdrew from AGCFF Gulf Club Champions League, the spot was passed to the next highest-placed team who did not qualified to the Asian club competitions.)
7	Al-Ettifaq	34	14	8	12	44	45	−1	50	
8	Al-Taawoun	34	12	9	13	40	39	+1	45	

Source: SPL
Rules for classification: 1) Points; 2) Head-to-head points; 3) Head-to-head goal difference; 4) Total goal difference; 5) Total goals scored; 6) Fair-play points
(Note: Head-to-head record is used only after all the matches between the teams in question have been played).

==== Results summary ====
Overall								Home						Away					
Pld	W	D	L	GF	GA	GD	Pts	W	D	L	GF	GA	GD	W	D	L	GF	GA	GD
34	18	6	10	65	41	+24	60	10	2	4	34	16	+18	8	4	6	31	25	+6

Last updated: 26 May 2025.
Source: Saudi Pro League

==== Results by round ====
Round	1	2	3	4	5	6	7	8	9	10	11	12	13	14	15	16	17	18	19	20	21	22	23	24	25	26	27	28	29	30	31	32	33	34
Ground	H	A	A	H	H	A	H	A	H	A	A	H	H	A	H	A	H	A	H	H	A	A	H	A	H	A	H	H	A	A	H	A	H	A
Result	L	W	W	W	W	L	L	W	W	W	D	L	D	L	W	L	W	L	W	L	D	W	W	D	W	W	W	D	D	L	W	W	L	W
Position	14	11	6	3	3	4	5	4	4	4	4	5	6	6	6	6	6	6	6	6	6	6	6	6	6	6	6	6	6	6	6	6	6	6

Updated to match(es) played on 26 May 2025. Source: Saudi Pro League
A = Away; H = Home; W = Win; D = Draw; L = Loss

==== Matches ====
All times are local, AST (UTC+3).

Win Draw Loss Postponed

24 August 2024 1	Al-Shabab	0–1	Al-Ettifaq	Riyadh
21:00		Report	Vitinho (yellow card) 58'; Dembélé 74'; Rodák (yellow card) 90'	Stadium: Al-Shabab Club Stadium; Attendance: 3,880; Referee: Majed Al-Shamrani

29 August 2024 2	Al-Khaleej	0–1	Al-Shabab	Dammam
21:00		Report	Al-Harbi (yellow card) 28'; Carrasco (yellow card) 56', (goal) 60'; Al-Sibyani (yellow card) 90+7'	Stadium: Prince Mohamed bin Fahd Stadium; Attendance: 1,347; Referee: Abdullah Al-Owaydan

15 September 2024 3	Al-Qadsiah	0–1	Al-Shabab	Dammam
18:20	Fernández (yellow card) 17'; Almena (yellow card) 52'; Nández (yellow card) 63'; Al-Qahtani (yellow card) 79'; Rashad (yellow card) 90+6'	Report	Kanabah 14'; Hoedt (yellow card) 35'; Kim Seung-gyu (yellow card) 82'; Al-Thani (yellow card) 89'	Stadium: Prince Mohamed bin Fahd Stadium; Attendance: 6,175; Referee: Faisal Al-Blwi

21 September 2024 4	Al-Shabab	1–0	Al-Taawoun	Riyadh
18:30	Hamdallah 25' (pen.); Kanabah (yellow card) 45'; Hoedt (yellow card) 83'	Report	Flávio (yellow card) 23'; Al-Mufarrij (yellow card) 30'; Al-Jumayah (yellow card) 85'; Mandash (yellow card) 90+7'	Stadium: Al-Shabab Club Stadium; Attendance: 5,943; Referee: Mohammed Al-Ismail

29 September 2024 5	Al-Shabab	2–1	Al-Raed	Riyadh
21:00	Hoedt 27'; Al-Sibyani (yellow card) 45+5'; Guanca 65'; Kanabah (yellow card) 81'; Abdullah (yellow card) 90+1'; Kim Seung-gyu (yellow card) 90+4'	Report	Sayoud 14'; Al-Subaie (yellow card) 45+4' (yellow-red card) 53'; Al-Rajeh (yellow card) 90+12'	Stadium: Al-Shabab Club Stadium; Attendance: 5,850; Referee: Abdulsamad Bakri

4 October 2024 6	Damac	1–0	Al-Shabab	Khamis Mushait
21:00	Chafaï (yellow card) 27'; Nkoudou 66'; Al-Anazi (yellow card) 90+3'	Report	Renan (yellow card) 7'; Bonaventura (yellow card) 63'; Kanabah (yellow card) 81'	Stadium: Damac Club Stadium; Attendance: 3,847; Referee: Abdullah Al-Kharboush

18 October 2024 7	Al-Shabab	1–2	Al-Nassr	Riyadh
21:00	Bonaventura (yellow card) 28'; Al-Sibyani (yellow card) 45'; Al-Hassan 90' (o.g.); Hamdallah (yellow card) 90+5'	Report	Al-Najdi (yellow card) 31'; Talisca (yellow card) 50'; Laporte 69'; Lajami (yellow card) 79'; Simakan (yellow card) 90+5' (yellow-red card) 90+12'; Ronaldo 90+7' (pen.)	Stadium: Al-Shabab Club Stadium; Attendance: 10,760; Referee: Darío Herrera (Argentina)

24 October 2024 8	Al-Orobah	0–3	Al-Shabab	Sakakah
18:15		Report	Camara 38'; Al-Juwayr (yellow card) 41', (goal) 90+4'; Coucke 64' (o.g.)	Stadium: Al Jouf University Stadium; Attendance: 2,319; Referee: Ahmed Al-Rumaikhani

31 October 2024 9	Al-Shabab	3–1	Al-Wehda	Riyadh
17:50	Guanca 35'; Al-Sibyani (yellow card) 38'; Hamdallah 52'; Al-Juwayr 61'; Kanabah (yellow card) 78'; Abdullah (yellow card) 81'; Al-Shanqiti (red card) 90+11'	Report	Bacuna 90+1' (pen.)	Stadium: Al-Shabab Club Stadium; Attendance: 2,661; Referee: Majed Al-Shamrani

7 November 2024 10	Al-Kholood	0–2	Al-Shabab	Buraidah
18:00		Report	Hamdallah 58' (pen.), 75'; Harboush (yellow card) 66'	Stadium: King Abdullah Sports City; Attendance: 1,110; Referee: Abdullah Al-Kharboush

22 November 2024 11	Al-Okhdood	1–1	Al-Shabab	Najran
18:05	Godwin (yellow card) 45'; Musona 49'; Asiri (yellow card) 72'; Petros (yellow card) 80'; Al-Qaydhi (yellow card) 90+8'	Report	Al-Sharari (yellow card) 45'; Asiri 45+3' (o.g.); Podence (yellow card) 57'	Stadium: Prince Hathloul bin Abdulaziz Sports City; Attendance: 1,464; Referee: Abdullah Al-Harbi

30 November 2024 12	Al-Shabab	1–2	Al-Hilal	Riyadh
20:00	Hamdallah 6'; Al-Juwayr (yellow card) 16'; Hoedt (yellow card) 32'; Al-Sharari (yellow card) 49', (red card) 58'	Report	Milinković-Savić 14', 62'; Koulibaly (red card) 44'; Al-Tombakti (yellow card) 90+6'	Stadium: Al-Shabab Club Stadium; Attendance: 11,507; Referee: Halil Umut Meler (Turkey)

5 December 2024 13	Al-Shabab	2–2	Al-Fateh	Riyadh
20:00	Al-Shuwayrikh (yellow card) 37'; Camara 54'; Al-Thani 57'; Al-Sadi (yellow card) 90+8'	Report	Batna 51' (pen.); Al-Julaydan (yellow card) 58'; Al-Masoud 80'	Stadium: Al-Shabab Club Stadium; Attendance: 4,277; Referee: Majed Al-Shamrani

10 January 2025 14	Al-Ahli	3–2	Al-Shabab	Jeddah
20:00	Toney 1'; Veiga 13', (yellow card) 23'; Balobaid 48'; Majrashi (yellow card) 85'	Report	Cuéllar (yellow card) 28'; Al-Sharari (yellow card) 52'; Kanabah (yellow card) 68'; Demiral 72' (o.g.); Al-Shuwayrikh (yellow card) 81'; Al-Juwayr 90+5'	Stadium: Prince Abdullah Al-Faisal Sports City; Attendance: 18,253; Referee: Szymon Marciniak (Poland)

15 January 2025 15	Al-Shabab	2–1	Al-Riyadh	Riyadh
18:05	Podence 72'; Hamdallah 90+7'	Report	Al-Shehri 56'	Stadium: Al-Shabab Club Stadium; Attendance: 3,085; Referee: Abdullah Al-Kharboush

22 January 2025 16	Al-Ittihad	2–1	Al-Shabab	Jeddah
20:00	Pereira (yellow card) 17'; Al-Aboud 32'; Al-Shanqeeti (yellow card) 35'; Benzema 45+3'	Report	Camara 45+5'; Hoedt (yellow card) 60'; Al-Thani (yellow card) 84'	Stadium: King Abdullah Sports City; Attendance: 41,704; Referee: Urs Schnyder (Switzerland)

27 January 2025 17	Al-Shabab	2–1	Al-Fayha	Riyadh
18:10	Hamdallah 34', 90+6' (pen.); Bonaventura (yellow card) 90+1'	Report	Al-Baqawi (yellow card) 45+1'; López (yellow card) 51', (goal) 57'; Mosquera (yellow card) 90+6'; Pozuelo (yellow card) 90+6'; Al-Khaibari (yellow card) 90+10'	Stadium: Al-Shabab Club Stadium; Attendance: 2,848; Referee: Mohammed Al-Ismail

31 January 2025 18	Al-Ettifaq	3–1	Al-Shabab	Dammam
20:00	Al-Malki (yellow card) 33'; Wijnaldum 35', 90+11'; Costa 43'; Ali (yellow card) 68'	Report	Hamdallah 40'	Stadium: EGO Stadium; Attendance: 9,132; Referee: Sami Al-Jires

6 February 2025 19	Al-Shabab	5–1	Al-Khaleej	Riyadh
18:20	Hoedt 25', 90+3'; Harboush (yellow card) 37'; Hamdallah 63', 77', 89'	Report	Al Salem 45', (yellow card) 90+1'; Martins (yellow card) 49'	Stadium: Al-Shabab Club Stadium; Attendance: 3,210; Referee: Abdullah Al-Shehri

13 February 2025 20	Al-Shabab	2–3	Al-Qadsiah	Riyadh
18:25	Guanca 16'; Camara 68'; Al Dubais (yellow card) 90+1'; Hamdallah (yellow card) 90+7'	Report	Nández (yellow card) 44'; Quiñones 49', 90+6', (yellow card) 90+8'; Asiri (yellow card) 56'; Aubameyang (red card) 79'; Hazazi 83'	Stadium: Al-Shabab Club Stadium; Attendance: 5,582; Referee: Alexis Herrera (Venezuela)

22 February 2025 21	Al-Taawoun	2–2	Al-Shabab	Buraidah
17:05	Rivas (yellow card) 29', (goal) 45+2'; Girotto (red card) 45+10'; Al-Mufarrij 70'	Report	Hamdallah 18' (pen.); Hoedt 31'; Al-Juwayr (yellow card) 45+1'; Kamara (yellow card) 49'; Camara (yellow card) 90+2'; Al-Shuwayrikh (yellow card) 90+7'; Bonaventura (yellow card) 90+8'	Stadium: Al-Taawoun Club Stadium; Attendance: 2,476; Referee: Faisal Al-Blwi

25 February 2025 22	Al-Raed	1–2	Al-Shabab	Buraidah
17:10	Tweh (yellow card) 58'; Abeid 70'	Report	Guanca 29', 88'; Renan (yellow card) 55'	Stadium: King Abdullah Sports City; Attendance: 1,804; Referee: Abdullah Al-Kharboush

28 February 2025 23	Al-Shabab	2–0	Damac	Riyadh
22:00	Leandrinho (yellow card) 49'; Guanca 61'; Al-Shuwayrikh 83'	Report	Chafaï (yellow card) 59'	Stadium: Al-Shabab Club Stadium; Attendance: 2,377; Referee: Khalid Al-Turais

7 March 2025 24	Al-Nassr	2–2	Al-Shabab	Riyadh
22:00	Simakan (yellow card) 37'; Yahya 45+2'; Ronaldo 45+7'; Al-Fatil (red card) 52'; Durán (yellow card) 87'	Report	Leandrinho (yellow card) 12'; Hamdallah 44' (pen.); Al-Shuwayrikh 67', (yellow card) 90+6'; Hoedt (yellow card) 87'	Stadium: Al-Awwal Park; Attendance: 15,316; Referee: Facundo Tello (Argentina)

13 March 2025 25	Al-Shabab	6–0	Al-Orobah	Riyadh
22:00	Hamdallah 16', 59' (pen.), 82' (pen.); Guanca 34'; Bonaventura 52'; Hoedt 69'; Al-Juwayr (yellow card) 89'	Report	Zouma (yellow card) 81'	Stadium: Al-Shabab Club Stadium; Attendance: 3,175; Referee: Mohammed Al-Hoaish

6 April 2025 26	Al-Wehda	1–3	Al-Shabab	Mecca
21:00	Noor (yellow card) 45+1'; Bacuna (yellow card) 48'; Goodwin 61'	Report	Renan (yellow card) 12'; Hamdallah 20'; Al-Shuwayrikh 69'; Camara 71'	Stadium: King Abdulaziz Sports City; Attendance: 892; Referee: Mohammed Al-Hoaish

10 April 2025 27	Al-Shabab	2–0	Al-Kholood	Riyadh
18:50	Guanca 12'; Hamdallah 45+4' (pen.); Renan (yellow card) 87'	Report	F. Al-Shamrani (yellow card) 58'	Stadium: Al-Shabab Club Stadium; Attendance: 2,880; Referee: Abdullah Al-Owaidan

17 April 2025 28	Al-Shabab	0–0	Al-Okhdood	Riyadh
18:50	Hamdallah (yellow card) 45+3'; Al-Juwayr (yellow card) 45+3'; Al-Thani (yellow card) 51'	Report	Petros (yellow card) 15'; Asiri (yellow card) 73'; Al Abbas (yellow card) 85'	Stadium: Al-Shabab Club Stadium; Attendance: 2,699; Referee: Majed Al-Shamrani

21 April 2025 29	Al-Hilal	2–2	Al-Shabab	Riyadh
18:55	Milinković-Savić 31', (yellow card) 56'; Mitrović (yellow card) 38'; S. Al-Dawsari 46'	Report	Podence 7', (yellow card) 32'; Hoedt (yellow card) 20'; Al-Thani (yellow card) 32'; Hamdallah (yellow card) 38'; Al-Shuwayrikh 68'; Renan (yellow card) 80'	Stadium: Kingdom Arena; Attendance: 18,769; Referee: Rade Obrenovič (Slovenia)

1 May 2025 30	Al-Fateh	3–1	Al-Shabab	Al-Hasa
21:00	Vargas 2'; Bendebka 4', (yellow card) 80'; Batna 16'; Al-Zarie (yellow card) 81'; Saâdane (yellow card) 82'	Report	Guanca 13'; Carrasco (yellow card) 80'; Podence (yellow card) 90+1' (yellow-red card) 90+2'	Stadium: Al-Fateh Club Stadium; Attendance: 11,214; Referee: Khalid Al-Turais

11 May 2025 31	Al-Shabab	3–1	Al-Ahli	Riyadh
19:05	Al-Thani 26'; Hamdallah 33', 65', (yellow card) 65' (yellow-red card) 76'; Al-Shuwayrikh (yellow card) 40'; Camara (yellow card) 74'; Harboush (yellow card) 75'; Renan (yellow card) 90+6'; Al-Juwayr (yellow card) 90+13'; Carrasco (yellow card) 90+13'	Report	Al-Rashidi (yellow card) 28'; Veiga 36'; Kessié (yellow card) 76'; Toney (yellow card) 78'; Demiral (yellow card) 90+2'; Al-Nabit (yellow card) 90+15'	Stadium: Al-Shabab Club Stadium; Attendance: 6,848; Referee: Felix Zwayer (Germany)

15 May 2025 32	Al-Riyadh	1–3	Al-Shabab	Riyadh
19:05	Mensah 29' (pen.), (yellow card) 77'; Assiri (yellow card) 32'; Zidan (yellow card) 55'; Bayesh (yellow card) 63'; Hawsawi (yellow card) 65'; Tozé (yellow card) 76'; Borjan (yellow card) 90+1'	Report	Al-Juwayr 15'; Hoedt (yellow card) 28'; Al-Shuwayrikh (yellow card) 39'; Camara 44'; Bonaventura (yellow card) 76'; Guanca 90+2'; Renan (yellow card) 90+6'	Stadium: Prince Faisal bin Fahd Sports City Stadium; Attendance: 824; Referee: Mohammed Al-Ismail

20 May 2025 33	Al-Shabab	2–3	Al-Ittihad	Riyadh
21:00	Carrasco 45+3'; Guanca 67'; Al-Shuwayrikh (yellow card) 90+1'; Podence (yellow card) 90+5'	Report	Diaby 1', 34', (yellow card) 90'; Bergwijn 58'; Fallatah (yellow card) 86'	Stadium: Al-Shabab Club Stadium; Attendance: 11,557; Referee: João Pinheiro (Portugal)

26 May 2025 34	Al-Fayha	0–2	Al-Shabab	Al Majma'ah
21:00	López (yellow card) 28'; Al-Rashidi (yellow card) 66'	Report	Bonaventura 9'; Guanca 85'; Harboush (yellow card) 90+3'	Stadium: Al Majma'ah Sports City; Attendance: 407; Referee: Abdullah Zarban

=== King Cup ===
All times are local, AST (UTC+3).

24 September 2024 Round of 32	Al-Kholood	1–3	Al-Shabab	Ar Rass
21:00	Troost-Ekong (yellow card) 25'; Maolida 29'; Gyömbér (yellow card) 45+3'	Report	Bonaventura 36'; Hamdallah 65', 80'; Guanca (yellow card) 70'	Stadium: Al-Hazem Club Stadium; Attendance: 1,299; Referee: Mohammed Abu Shaqarah

28 October 2024 Round of 16	Al-Riyadh	0–2	Al-Shabab	Riyadh
17:50	Barbet (yellow card) 81'; Al-Khaibari (yellow card) 88'	Report	Camara 37'; Kanabah (yellow card) 68'; Bonaventura 90+3'	Stadium: Prince Faisal bin Fahd Sports City Stadium; Referee: Khalid Al-Teris

6 January 2025 Quarter-finals	Al-Shabab	2–1	Al-Fayha	Riyadh
18:00	Podence 2'; Hamdallah 26'; Al-Sharari (yellow card) 55'	Report	Shukurov (yellow card) 51'; Kaabi (yellow card) 53'; Abdi (yellow card) 73'; Al-Rashidi 88'	Stadium: Al-Shabab Club Stadium; Attendance: 4,586; Referee: Sami Al-Jires

1 April 2025 Semi-finals	Al-Ittihad	3–2	Al-Shabab	Jeddah
21:00	Fabinho 14' (pen.); Benzema (yellow card) 36'; Pereira 90+2', 90+9', (yellow card) 90+10'; Rajković (yellow card) 90+15'	Report	Al-Shuwayrikh (yellow card) 39'; Guanca 64', 67'	Stadium: Alinma Stadium; Attendance: 46,594; Referee: Sascha Stegemann (Germany)

== Statistics ==
=== Appearances ===
Last updated on 26 May 2025.

No.	Pos	Nat	Player	Total		Pro League		King's Cup	
No.	Pos	Nat	Player	Apps	Goals	Apps	Goals	Apps	Goals
Goalkeepers
22	GK	(Saudi Arabia) KSA	Mohammed Al-Otaibi	0	0	0	0	0	0
31	GK	(Ukraine) UKR	Heorhiy Bushchan	13	0	12	0	1	0
33	GK	(Saudi Arabia) KSA	Abdullah Al-Mayouf	16	0	13+1	0	2	0
50	GK	(Saudi Arabia) KSA	Mohammed Al-Absi	1	0	1	0	0	0
55	GK	(Saudi Arabia) KSA	Mishal Saad	0	0	0	0	0	0
Defenders
2	DF	(Saudi Arabia) KSA	Mohammed Al-Shuwayrikh	22	4	12+8	4	1+1	0
3	DF	(Brazil) BRA	Leandrinho	11	0	6+4	0	1	0
4	DF	(Netherlands) NED	Wesley Hoedt	35	5	31	5	4	0
5	DF	(Saudi Arabia) KSA	Nader Al-Sharari	32	0	22+6	0	3+1	0
16	DF	(Saudi Arabia) KSA	Hussain Al-Sibyani	11	0	9	0	2	0
30	DF	(Brazil) BRA	Robert Renan	35	0	30+1	0	4	0
36	DF	(Saudi Arabia) KSA	Adel Al-Mutairi	1	0	0+1	0	0	0
38	DF	(Saudi Arabia) KSA	Mohammed Harbush	14	0	1+11	0	0+2	0
45	DF	(Saudi Arabia) KSA	Amjad Haraj	0	0	0	0	0	0
66	DF	(Saudi Arabia) KSA	Nawaf Al-Ghulaimish	11	0	5+6	0	0	0
Midfielders
7	MF	(Italy) ITA	Giacomo Bonaventura	33	4	26+3	2	2+2	2
8	MF	(Saudi Arabia) KSA	Fahad Al-Muwallad	2	0	2	0	0	0
10	MF	(Belgium) BEL	Yannick Carrasco	18	2	14+2	2	2	0
11	MF	(Argentina) ARG	Cristian Guanca	38	14	34	12	4	2
12	MF	(Saudi Arabia) KSA	Majed Kanabah	31	1	11+17	1	1+2	0
14	MF	(Finland) FIN	Glen Kamara	14	0	11+2	0	0+1	0
15	MF	(Saudi Arabia) KSA	Musab Al-Juwayr	33	4	27+2	4	4	0
17	MF	(Saudi Arabia) KSA	Younes Al-Shanqeeti	6	0	0+6	0	0	0
21	MF	(Saudi Arabia) KSA	Nawaf Al-Sadi	32	0	5+24	0	0+3	0
46	MF	(Saudi Arabia) KSA	Emad Qaysi	2	0	0+2	0	0	0
56	MF	(Portugal) POR	Daniel Podence	21	3	18+1	2	2	1
Forwards
9	FW	(Morocco) MAR	Abderrazak Hamdallah	30	24	26	21	4	3
34	FW	(Saudi Arabia) KSA	Hisham Al Dubais	9	0	0+9	0	0	0
70	FW	(Saudi Arabia) KSA	Haroune Camara	34	7	17+14	6	2+1	1
71	FW	(Saudi Arabia) KSA	Mohammed Al-Thani	30	2	23+3	2	4	0
77	FW	(Saudi Arabia) KSA	Hamad Al-Khurayef	1	0	0+1	0	0	0
90	FW	(Saudi Arabia) KSA	Majed Abdullah	11	0	0+10	0	0+1	0
Player who made an appearance this season but have left the club
6	MF	(Colombia) COL	Gustavo Cuéllar	9	0	8	0	0+1	0
18	GK	(South Korea) KOR	Kim Seung-gyu	9	0	8	0	1	0
24	DF	(Saudi Arabia) KSA	Moteb Al-Harbi	2	0	2	0	0	0
28	MF	(Saudi Arabia) KSA	Nasser Al-Bishi	0	0	0	0	0	0
60	GK	(Saudi Arabia) KSA	Mohammad Al-Hakim	0	0	0	0	0	0

=== Goalscorers ===
Rank	No.	Pos	Nat	Name	Pro League	King's Cup	Total
1	9	FW	(Morocco)	Abderrazak Hamdallah	21	3	24
2	11	MF	(Argentina)	Cristian Guanca	12	2	14
3	70	FW	(Saudi Arabia)	Haroune Camara	6	1	7
4	4	DF	(Netherlands)	Wesley Hoedt	5	0	5
5	2	DF	(Saudi Arabia)	Mohammed Al-Shuwayrikh	4	0	4
5	7	MF	(Italy)	Giacomo Bonaventura	2	2	4
5	15	MF	(Saudi Arabia)	Musab Al-Juwayr	4	0	4
8	56	MF	(Portugal)	Daniel Podence	2	1	3
9	10	MF	(Belgium)	Yannick Carrasco	2	0	2
9	71	FW	(Saudi Arabia)	Mohammed Al-Thani	2	0	2
11	12	MF	(Saudi Arabia)	Majed Kanabah	1	0	1
Own goal					4	0	4
Total					65	9	74

Last Updated: 26 May 2025

=== Assists ===
Rank	No.	Pos	Nat	Name	Pro League	King Cup	Total
1	11	MF	(Argentina)	Cristian Guanca	11	2	13
2	15	MF	(Saudi Arabia)	Musab Al-Juwayr	9	1	10
3	56	MF	(Portugal)	Daniel Podence	7	0	7
4	10	MF	(Belgium)	Yannick Carrasco	4	1	5
5	9	FW	(Morocco)	Abderrazak Hamdallah	2	2	4
6	7	MF	(Italy)	Giacomo Bonaventura	2	1	3
6	30	DF	(Brazil)	Robert Renan	3	0	3
6	70	FW	(Saudi Arabia)	Haroune Camara	3	0	3
9	3	DF	(Brazil)	Leandrinho	1	0	1
9	4	DF	(Netherlands)	Wesley Hoedt	1	0	1
9	5	DF	(Saudi Arabia)	Nader Al-Sharari	1	0	1
9	12	MF	(Saudi Arabia)	Majed Kanabah	1	0	1
9	21	MF	(Saudi Arabia)	Nawaf Al-Sadi	1	0	1
Total					46	7	53

Last Updated: 26 May 2025

=== Clean sheets ===
Rank	No.	Pos	Nat	Name	Pro League	King's Cup	Total
1	33	GK	(Saudi Arabia)	Abdullah Al-Mayouf	6	1	7
2	18	GK	(South Korea)	Kim Seung-gyu	4	0	4
3	50	GK	(Saudi Arabia)	Mohammed Al-Absi	1	0	1
Total					10	1	11

Last Updated: 26 May 2025
