= Leandrinho =

Leandrinho may also refer to:

- Leandrinho (footballer, born 1978), Leandro Dos Santos Morais Feitosa, Brazilian footballer Midfielder
- Leandro Barbosa (born 1982), Brazilian professional basketball player
- Leandrinho (footballer, born 1998), Brazilian footballer
- Leandrinho (footballer, born 2005), Brazilian footballer
