= Glen Kamara =

Finnish footballer (born 1995)

- Kamara with Queens Park Rangers in 2026

Personal information
- Full name: Glen Adjei Kamara
- Date of birth: 28 October 1995 (age 31)
- Place of birth: Tampere, Finland
- Height: 1.81 m (5 ft 11 in)
- Position: Central midfielder

Team information
- Current team: Queens Park Rangers (on loan from Rennes)
- Number: 18

Youth career
- 2003–2007: Olarin Tarmo
- 2008: EPS
- 2011–2012: Southend United
- 2012–2015: Arsenal

Senior career*
Years	Team	Apps	(Gls)
2015–2017	Arsenal	0	(0)
2016	→ Southend United (loan)	6	(0)
2016–2017	→ Colchester United (loan)	4	(0)
2017–2019	Dundee	54	(0)
2019–2023	Rangers	118	(6)
2023–2024	Leeds United	37	(0)
2024–	Rennes	17	(0)
2025	→ Al Shabab (loan)	13	(0)
2026–	→ Queens Park Rangers (loan)	15	(1)

International career^{‡}
2013	Finland U18	3	(0)
2012–2013	Finland U19	7	(0)
2014	Finland U20	3	(0)
2014–2016	Finland U21	14	(0)
2017–	Finland	72	(2)
Medal record
Rangers
First place	Scottish Premiership	2020–21
First place	Scottish Cup	2021–22
Second place	Scottish League Cup	2019–20
Second place	Scottish League Cup	2022–23
Second place	UEFA Europa League	2021–22
- * Club domestic league appearances and goals as of 22 November 2026 ‡ National team caps and goals as of 3 October 2026

Glen Adjei Kamara (born 28 October 1995) is a Finnish professional footballer who plays as a central midfielder for EFL Championship club Queens Park Rangers, on loan from Ligue 1 club Rennes, and the Finland national team.

Kamara began his senior career at Arsenal, where he made one substitute appearance in the Football League Cup and was loaned to Southend United and Colchester United. After 18 months at Dundee, he joined fellow Scottish Premiership side Rangers for £50,000. He made the PFA Scotland Team of the Year when they won the league title in 2020–21. In late August 2023 it was announced that he would be leaving Rangers to join Leeds United in the EFL Championship. After a successful season with Leeds, Kamara joined French side Rennes for a €10 million fee. Six months later, he signed for Al Shabab on loan.

Kamara made his senior international debut for Finland in 2017. He was named in their squad for UEFA Euro 2020. In 2022, he was recognized as Finnish Footballer of the Year by the Football Association of Finland.

== Youth career ==
=== Finland ===
Kamara was born in Tampere, Finland, to refugee parents from Sierra Leone. He was raised in Soukka, in the city of Espoo, from the age of two until the age of 12, when he moved to London, England, with his mother and sister. In Espoo, Kamara had played football in the youth sectors of Olarin Tarmo –77 in Olari, and in Espoon Palloseura (EPS) in Espoonlahti.

=== England ===
Kamara continued his career in England for Sunday side Westway of Ladbroke Grove, before moving to the Southend United youth system and then on to Arsenal in 2012.

== Club career ==
=== Arsenal ===
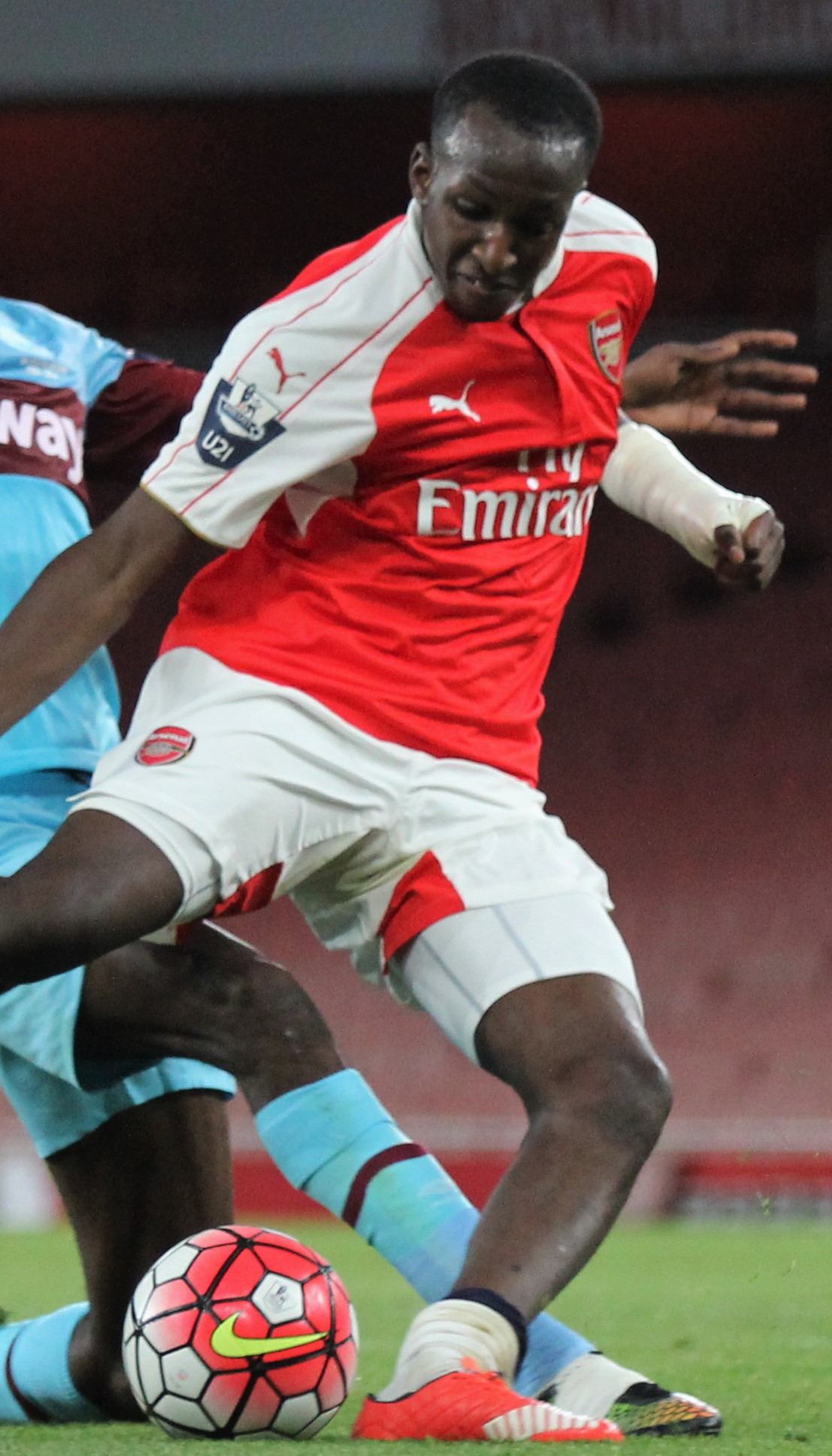
Kamara playing for Arsenal U21s in 2015

At first Kamara joined up with the club's academy. He went on to be an unused substitute for Arsenal's UEFA Champions League match against Galatasaray in December 2014. Kamara made his only appearance for Arsenal a day before his 20th birthday on 27 October 2015, up against Sheffield Wednesday in the EFL League Cup fourth round in an eventual 3–0 away loss; he started the match and was substituted for Krystian Bielik after an hour.

On 22 January 2016, Kamara returned to Southend in League One, on loan for the rest of the season. He played six matches, all but one as a starter.

On deadline day of the summer transfer window, 31 August 2016, Kamara joined Colchester United in League Two on loan until January 2017. He played six times, starting just once in the league.

=== Dundee ===
On 13 July 2017, Kamara signed a two-year deal with Dundee. He made his debut for the club in a Scottish League Cup game away to Raith Rovers where he put in a man of the match performance.

=== Rangers ===
On 5 January 2019, Kamara signed a pre-contract with Rangers on a four-and-a-half-year deal. On 31 January, this deal was brought forward when the two clubs agreed to a £50,000 transfer. He scored his first goal in senior club football on 27 February 2019, opening a 4–0 home win over his former club Dundee.

On 18 March 2021, Kamara accused Slavia Prague player Ondřej Kúdela of racist verbal abuse during a Europa League knockout match. Kúdela denied the claims of racism and claimed that after the match Kamara physically assaulted Kúdela in the stadium tunnel in front of UEFA officials and Rangers manager Steven Gerrard. Ahead of the Old Firm derby, Celtic and Rangers players stood side by side in support of Kamara. On 14 April, UEFA officially found both Kamara and Kúdela guilty. Kúdela was banned for racial abuse for 10 UEFA matches, while Kamara was handed a three-match ban for assault.

On 22 September 2021, Kamara signed a new four-year contract with the club that would see him remain with the club until the summer of 2025. Days later, he was sent off away to Sparta Prague, a game in which his every touch was booed by the mostly underaged audience in relation to the Kúdela abuse; UEFA found insufficient evidence of a racial motive and did not punish the club.

Kamara was an integral part of the Rangers squad in the club's 2021–22 UEFA Europa League campaign. He scored an important goal against RB Leipzig in the second leg of the semi finals, and helped Rangers to reach to the finals of the competition, where they eventually fell short to Eintracht Frankfurt losing on penalties.

=== Leeds United ===
On 31 August 2023, Kamara signed a four-year deal with English club Leeds United for an undisclosed fee. However, the transfer fee was reported in media to be around £5.5 million.

He became the fifth Finnish player to sign for Leeds after Sebastian Sorsa, Mika Väyrynen, Mikael Forssell and Aapo Halme. Kamara made his debut for Leeds in the EFL Championship on 2 September 2023, as a late substitute in a 0–0 home draw against Sheffield Wednesday.

On 18 February 2024, after his first 25 matches in Championship, Kamara had a successful passing rate of 93.5%. Leeds finished 3rd in the Championship table and advanced to the promotion play-off final, where they eventually fell short to Southampton.

=== Rennes ===
On 16 July 2024, Kamara joined Ligue 1 club Rennes for a reported €10 million fee, signing a deal until June 2028. He made his official debut in Ligue 1 with his new club on 18 August 2024, in a season opening game against Lyon, playing full 90 minutes and helping his side to a 3–0 home win.

==== Al Shabab ====
On 31 January 2025, Kamara was loaned out to Saudi Pro League club Al Shabab, becoming the first Finnish player in the Saudi league.

==== Queens Park Rangers ====
On 3 August 2026, Kamara was loaned out to EFL Championship club Queens Park Rangers.

== International career ==
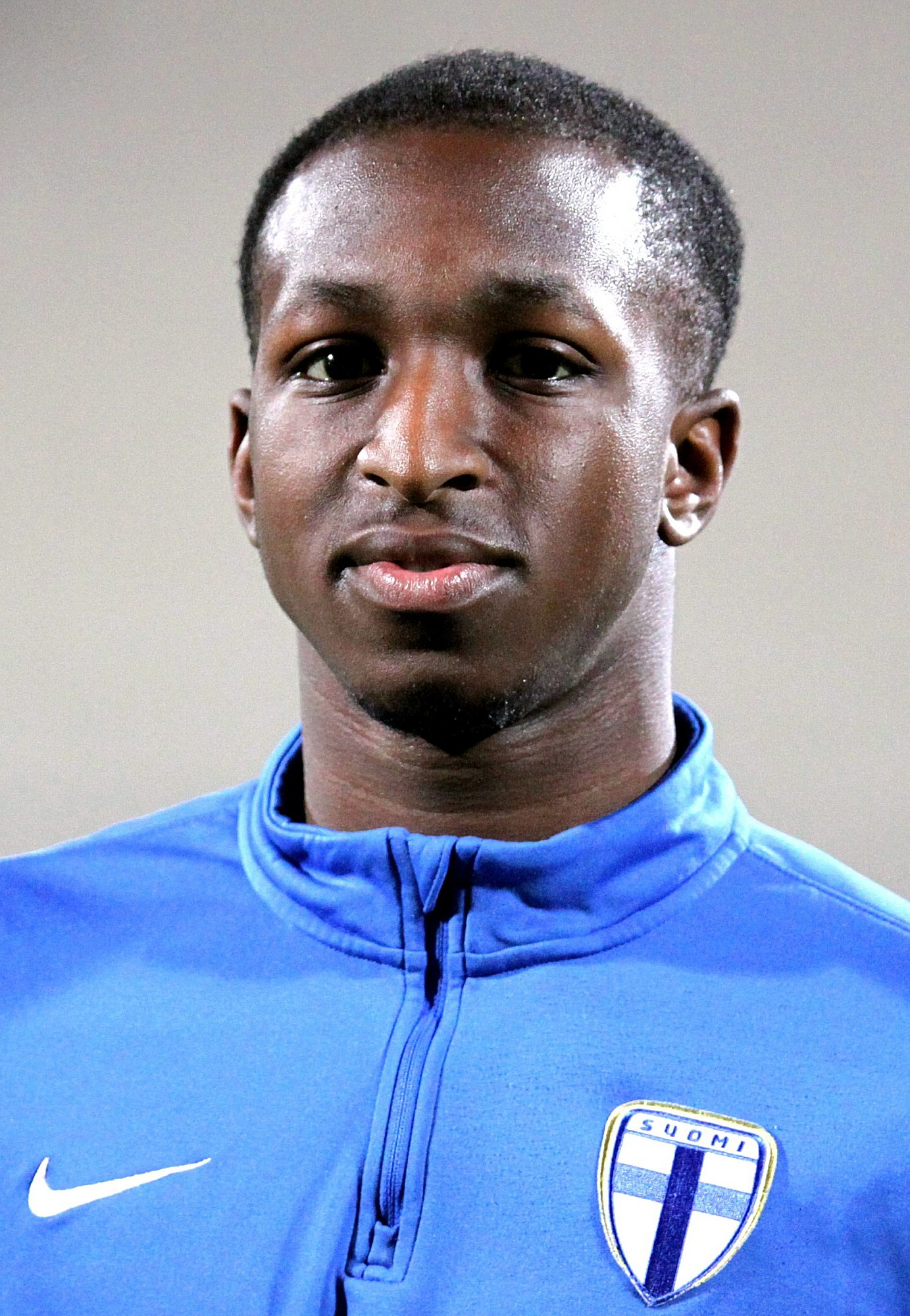
Kamara with Finland U21 in 2015

Kamara represented Finland at under-19 and under-21 level. He was an unused substitute for the senior side in a friendly against Estonia in June 2015. On 9 November 2017, he made his debut in a 3–0 victory over the same country in a friendly match. He scored his first international goal to conclude a 2–0 home win over Greece in the UEFA Nations League on 15 October 2018.

Kamara was called up for Finland's first major tournament, the delayed UEFA Euro 2020 in June 2021.

He played in all 10 games in Finland's UEFA Euro 2024 qualification campaign, scoring once.

Kamara was called up to the Finland squad for the 2026–27 UEFA Nations League matches in late September 2026. He left the squad before the last international match of the camp by the demand of his parent club QPR. Finnish FA announced their concern of the club's actions to FIFA.

== Career statistics ==
=== Club ===
As of match played 19 September 2026

Appearances and goals by club, season and competition
Club	Season	League			National cup (Note: Includes FA Cup, Scottish Cup, Coupe de France, King's Cup)		League cup (Note: Includes EFL Cup, Scottish League Cup)		Continental		Other		Total	
Club	Season	Division	Apps	Goals	Apps	Goals	Apps	Goals	Apps	Goals	Apps	Goals	Apps	Goals
Arsenal	2015–16	Premier League	0	0	0	0	1	0	0	0	—		1	0
Arsenal	2016–17	Premier League	0	0	0	0	0	0	0	0	—		0	0
Arsenal	Total		0	0	0	0	1	0	0	0	—		1	0
Southend United (loan)	2015–16	League One	6	0	0	0	0	0	—		—		6	0
Colchester United (loan)	2016–17	League Two	4	0	0	0	0	0	—		2 (Note: Appearances in EFL Trophy)	0	6	0
Dundee	2017–18	Scottish Premiership	37	0	3	0	6	0	—		—		46	0
Dundee	2018–19	Scottish Premiership	17	0	0	0	2	0	—		—		19	0
Dundee	Total		54	0	3	0	8	0	—		—		65	0
Rangers	2018–19	Scottish Premiership	13	1	3	0	0	0	0	0	—		16	1
Rangers	2019–20	Scottish Premiership	19	0	1	0	4	1	15 (Note: Appearances in UEFA Europa League)	0	—		39	1
Rangers	2020–21	Scottish Premiership	33	1	3	0	2	0	13	1	—		51	2
Rangers	2021–22	Scottish Premiership	31	3	3	0	3	0	15	1	—		52	4
Rangers	2022–23	Scottish Premiership	22	1	2	0	3	0	8 (Note: Appearances in UEFA Champions League)	0	—		35	1
Rangers	Total		118	6	12	0	12	1	51	2	—		193	9
Leeds United	2023–24	Championship	37	0	2	0	0	0	—		3 (Note: Appearances in Championship play-offs)	0	42	0
Rennes	2024–25	Ligue 1	13	0	0	0	—		—		—		13	0
Rennes	2025–26	Ligue 1	4	0	1	0	—		—		—		5	0
Rennes	Total		17	0	1	0	—		—		—		18	0
Al Shabab (loan)	2024–25	Saudi Pro League	13	0	1	0	—		—		—		14	0
QPR (loan)	2026–27	Championship	7	0	0	0	0	0	–		0	0	7	0
Career total			256	6	19	0	21	1	51	2	5	0	352	9

=== International ===
As of match played 3 October 2026

Appearances and goals by national team and year
National team	Year	Apps	Goals
Finland	2017	1	0
Finland	2018	8	1
Finland	2019	10	0
Finland	2020	8	0
Finland	2021	13	0
Finland	2022	8	0
Finland	2023	10	1
Finland	2024	7	0
Finland	2025	5	0
Finland	2026	2	0
Total		72	2

Scores and results list Finland's goal tally first, score column indicates score after each Kamara goal.

List of international goals scored by Glen Kamara
No.	Date	Venue	Opponent	Score	Result	Competition
1	15 October 2018	Tampere Stadium, Tampere, Finland	Greece	2–0	2–0	2018–19 UEFA Nations League C
2	19 June 2023	Helsinki Olympic Stadium, Helsinki, Finland	San Marino	1–0	6–0	UEFA Euro 2024 qualifying

== Honours ==
Rangers

- Scottish Premiership: 2020–21
- Scottish Premiership runner-up: 2018–19, 2019–20, 2021–22, 2022–23
- Scottish Cup: 2021–22
- Scottish League Cup runner-up: 2019–20, 2022–23
- UEFA Europa League runner-up: 2021–22

Individual

- PFA Scotland Team of the Year: 2020–21 Scottish Premiership
- Finnish Footballer of the Year: 2022
