= Haroune Camara =

Saudi Arabian footballer (born 1998)

Personal information
- Full name: Haroune Moussa Camara
- Date of birth: 1 January 1998 (age 28)
- Place of birth: Riyadh, Saudi Arabia
- Height: 1.82 m (5 ft 11 1/2 in)
- Position: Striker

Team information
- Current team: Neom (on loan from Al-Nassr)
- Number: 70

Youth career
- –2016: Al-Riyadh
- 2016–2017: Al-Faisaly
- 2017–2018: Al-Qadsiah

Senior career*
Years	Team	Apps	(Gls)
2018–2019	Al-Qadsiah	36	(11)
2019–2024	Al-Ittihad	87	(12)
2024	→ Al-Ettifaq (loan)	9	(1)
2024–2025	Al-Shabab	32	(6)
2025–	Al-Nassr	3	(0)
2026	→ Al-Shabab (loan)	6	(1)
2026–	→ Neom (loan)	11	(0)

International career^{‡}
2018–2021	Saudi Arabia U23	5	(3)
2018–	Saudi Arabia	13	(0)
- * Club domestic league appearances and goals as of 5 November 2026 ‡ National team caps and goals as of 17 December 2024

Haroune Moussa Camara (Arabic: هارون موسى كمارا; born 1 January 1998) is a Saudi Arabian professional footballer who plays as a striker for Saudi Pro League club Neom, on loan from Al-Nassr. He previously played for Al-Qadsiah, Al-Ittihad, Al-Ettifaq and Al-Shabab. He has also represented the Saudi Arabia national team.

== Club career ==
Camara began his career at Al-Riyadh before joining Al-Faisaly in 2016. In January 2017, Camara joined Al-Qadsiah on a five-year deal. He made his first team debut and scored his first goal on 21 February 2018 in the league match against derby rivals Al-Ettifaq. On 17 July 2019, Camara joined Al-Ittihad for a reported fee of SAR30 million on a five-year contract. On 23 August 2019, Camara made his debut for Al-Ittihad by coming off the bench and replacing Aleksandar Prijović in the 85th minute. On 4 October 2019, Camara scored his first goal for Al-Ittihad in the 1–2 defeat to Al-Hazem. On 17 January 2024, Camara joined Al-Ettifaq on a six-month loan. On 17 July 2024, Camara joined Al-Shabab on a two-year deal. On 6 September 2025, Camara joined Saudi Pro League club Al-Nassr on a three-year deal. On 2 February 2026, Camara joined Al-Shabab on a six-month loan.

== International career ==
Camara made his debut for Saudi Arabia on 10 September 2018 during the 2–2 friendly draw against Bolivia.

He was part of the 2019 WAFF Championship and 2022 FIFA World Cup qualification squads.

== Personal life ==
Camara was granted Saudi citizenship in 2021.

== Career statistics ==
=== Club ===
As of 24 December 2025.

Club	Division	Season	League		King Cup		Continental		Other		Total	
Club	Division	Season	Apps	Goals	Apps	Goals	Apps	Goals	Apps	Goals	Apps	Goals
Al-Qadsiah	SPL	2017–18	7	4	1	0	—		—		8	4
Al-Qadsiah	SPL	2018–19	29	7	1	0	—		—		30	7
Al-Qadsiah	Total		36	11	2	0	0	0	0	0	38	11
Al-Ittihad	SPL	2019–20	17	1	1	0	0	0	4 (Note: Appearances in Arab Club Champions Cup)	0	22	1
Al-Ittihad	SPL	2020–21	22	2	2	0	—		2	0	26	2
Al-Ittihad	SPL	2021–22	22	5	2	0	—		0	0	24	5
Al-Ittihad	SPL	2022–23	18	4	2	1	—		2 (Note: Appearances in Saudi Super Cup)	0	22	5
Al-Ittihad	SPL	2023–24	8	0	1	0	4	1	1	0	14	1
Al-Ittihad	Total		87	12	8	1	4	1	9	0	108	14
→ Al-Ettifaq (loan)	SPL	2023–24	9	1	0	0	—		—		9	1
Al-Shabab	SPL	2024–25	31	6	3	1	—		—		34	7
Al-Shabab	SPL	2025–26	1	0	0	0	—		0	0	1	0
Al-Shabab	Total		32	6	3	1	0	0	0	0	35	7
Al-Nassr	SPL	2025–26	2	0	1	0	4	1	0	0	7	1
Career total			166	30	14	2	8	2	9	0	197	34

=== International ===
As of 17 December 2024

Saudi Arabia
Year	Apps	Goals
2018	4	0
2019	5	0
2022	1	0
2023	2	0
2024	1	0
2025	0	0
Total	13	0

== Honours ==
Al-Ittihad

- Saudi Pro League: 2022–23
- Saudi Super Cup: 2022
