= Nader Al-Sharari =

Saudi Arabian association footballer

Nader Al-Sharari نادر الشراري
Personal information
- Full name: Nader Abdullah Al-Sharari
- Date of birth: 8 May 1996 (age 30)
- Place of birth: Qurayyat, Saudi Arabia
- Height: 1.84 m (6 ft 1/2 in)
- Position: Centre-back

Team information
- Current team: Al-Nassr
- Number: 4

Youth career
- Al-Orobah

Senior career*
Years	Team	Apps	(Gls)
2017–2020	Al-Orobah	39	(1)
2020–2021	Abha	27	(0)
2021–2025	Al-Shabab	72	(0)
2025–	Al-Nassr	10	(0)
- * Club domestic league appearances and goals as of 25 August 2026

Nader Al-Sharari (Arabic: نادر الشراري; born 8 May 1996) is a Saudi Arabian professional footballer who plays as a centre-back for Saudi Pro League club Al-Nassr.

== Career ==
Al-Sharari began his career in the youth setups of Al-Orobah. He made his debut during the 2016–17 season. On 18 April 2018, Al-Sharari scored his first goal for the club in the league match against Damac. He spent 4 seasons at Al-Orobah and made 41 appearances. On 31 January 2020, Al-Sharari joined Pro League side Abha on a 2-year contract. On 2 February 2021, Al-Sharari signed a pre-contract agreement with Al-Shabab. He officially joined Al-Shabab following the conclusion of the 2020–21 season, signing a four-year contract.

On 16 July 2025, Al-Sharari joined Al-Nassr on a free transfer. He signed a three-year deal.

== Career statistics ==
=== Club ===
As of match played 31 May 2024

Appearances and goals by club, season and competition
Club	Season	League			King Cup		Asia		Other		Total	
Club	Season	Division	Apps	Goals	Apps	Goals	Apps	Goals	Apps	Goals	Apps	Goals
Al-Orobah	2016–17	First Division	2	0	0	0	—		0	0	2	0
Al-Orobah	2017–18	MS League	11	1	0	0	—		—		11	1
Al-Orobah	2018–19	MS League	17	0	2	0	—		—		19	0
Al-Orobah	2019–20	Second Division	9	0	0	0	—		—		9	0
Al-Orobah	Total		39	1	2	0	0	0	0	0	41	1
Abha	2019–20	Pro League	7	0	0	0	—		—		7	0
Abha	2020–21	Pro League	20	0	1	0	—		—		21	0
Abha	Total		27	0	1	0	0	0	0	0	28	0
Al-Shabab	2021–22	Pro League	8	0	1	0	5	0	—		14	0
Al-Shabab	2022–23	Pro League	10	0	0	0	1	0	3 (Note: Appearances in Arab Club Champions Cup)	0	14	0
Al-Shabab	2023–24	Pro League	26	0	2	0	—		3	0	31	0
Al-Shabab	2024–25	Pro League	28	0	4	0	—		—		32	0
Al-Shabab	Total		72	0	7	0	6	0	6	0	91	0
Al-Nassr	2025–26	Pro League	0	0	0	0	0	0	0	0	0	0
Career total			138	1	10	0	6	0	6	0	160	1

== Honours ==
Al-Nassr

- Saudi Pro League: 2025–26
