= Giacomo Bonaventura =

Italian footballer (born 1989)

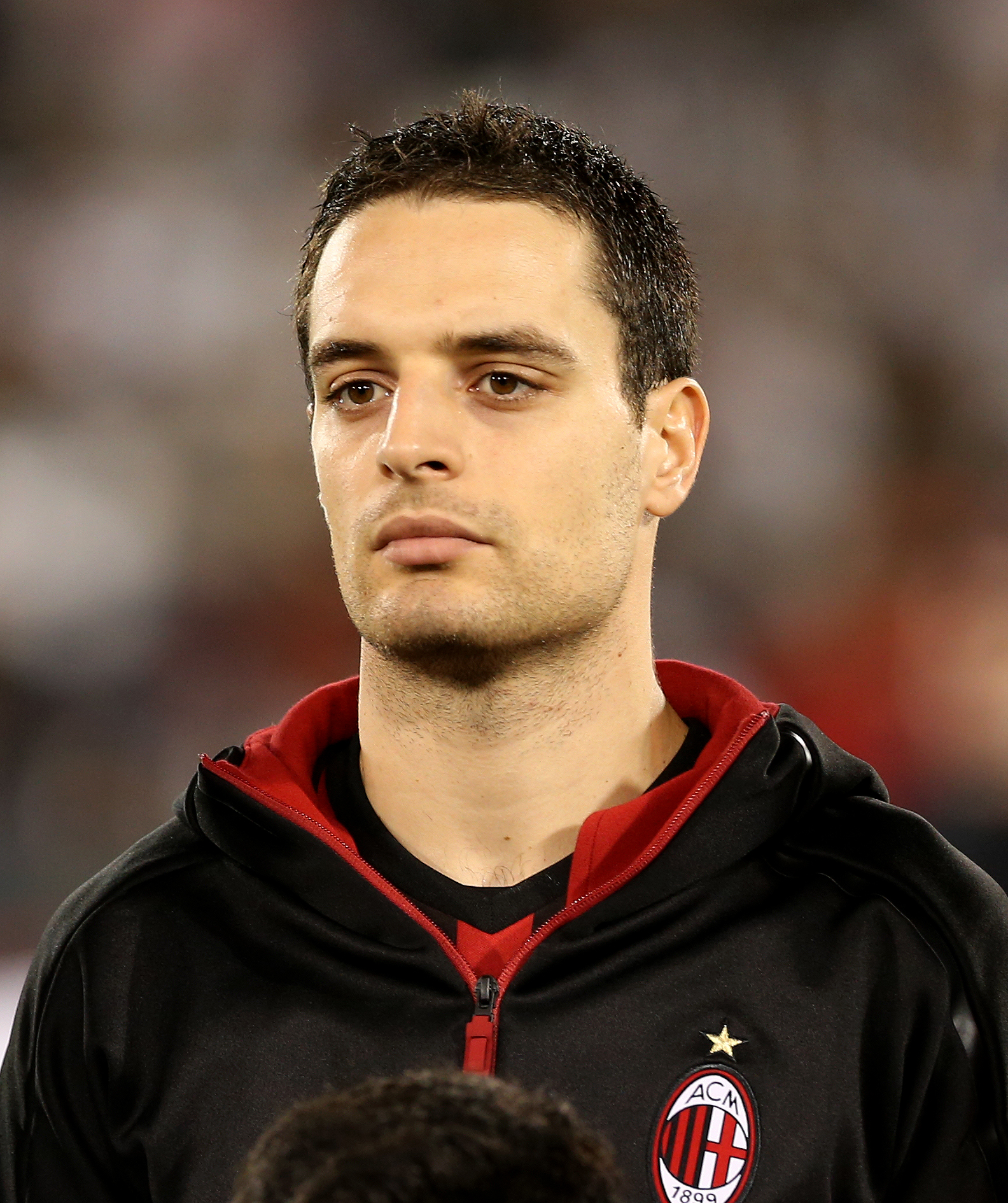
- Bonaventura with Milan in 2016

Personal information
- Full name: Giacomo Bonaventura
- Date of birth: 22 August 1989 (age 37)
- Place of birth: San Severino Marche, Italy
- Height: 1.80 m (5 ft 11 in)
- Positions: Midfielder; winger

Youth career
- 2006–2007: Atalanta

Senior career*
Years	Team	Apps	(Gls)
2007–2014	Atalanta	130	(23)
2009	→ Pergocrema (loan)	3	(1)
2010	→ Padova (loan)	16	(0)
2014–2020	AC Milan	155	(30)
2020–2024	Fiorentina	126	(20)
2024–2025	Al-Shabab	29	(2)
Total		459	(76)

International career
2008	Italy U19	4	(1)
2009–2010	Italy U20	12	(2)
2013–2024	Italy	18	(1)
- * Club domestic league appearances and goals

Giacomo "Jack" Bonaventura (Italian: [ˈdʒaːkomo ˈdʒɛk bonavenˈtuːra, - ˌbɔ-]; born 22 August 1989) is an Italian former professional footballer.

Bonaventura started his senior career at Atalanta in the Serie A in 2007; his impressive performances earned him a €7 million transfer to AC Milan in 2014, where he spent six seasons. He then joined Fiorentina in 2020, before leaving Italy to join Saudi club Al-Shabab in 2024.

Bonaventura became a youth international in 2008, first playing for the Italy under-19s and later the under-20s. He made his senior international debut on 31 May 2013, in a friendly match against San Marino.

== Club career ==
=== Atalanta ===
After playing for San Francesco 93' youth team, he was transferred to Tolentino, where he was noticed by one of Atalanta's scouts, Antonio Bongiorni. Bonaventura made his debut with Atalanta on 4 May 2008, in a match against Livorno. He only played this match in the whole 2007–08 season. He appeared again on 9 November, against Fiorentina.

On 13 January 2009, Atalanta announced he had joined Pergocrema on loan for the remainder of the 2008–09 season. Five days later, he made his debut for Pergocrema, getting on the scoresheet in a match against Sambenedettese. He made three more appearances before returning to Atalanta.

He returned to La Dea, but had to wait until January 2010 to appear again, this time against Palermo. On 1 February, he joined Serie B club Padova on loan until the end of the season. He made his debut for the club on the 20th, against Triestina.

In June 2010, Padova decided not to buy him outright, and Bonaventura returned to Atalanta, signing a contract extension until 2015.

On 9 November, he scored his first Atalanta goal, against Modena. He played a key part for La Dea during the 2010–11 season, scoring nine times, with his club being crowned Serie B champions, thus earning promotion to Serie A. On 11 April 2012, he scored his first Serie A goal, against Napoli, before scoring again in a 2–0 victory against Fiorentina on 29 April. He scored his first brace on 3 March 2013, in a 2–0 victory against Siena.

=== AC Milan ===
==== 2014–15 season ====
In late August, Atalanta and Hellas Verona had agreed for the signature of Bonaventura and Verona's ex sporting director, Sogliano, had talked to Giacomo but on 1 September 2014, in the last hours of the Italian transfer window, AC Milan announced the signature of Bonaventura from Atalanta for a fee reported to be around €7 million after they failed to sign Jonathan Biabiany. His agent later revealed that Bonaventura cried after signing for Milan as his dream became true. He was given the number 28, which was previously worn by Urby Emanuelson. On 14 September, Bonaventura scored a goal on his debut as Milan beat Parma 5–4. Bonaventura scored his second goal for Milan on 29 October against Cagliari and was voted man of the match. On 12 December, Bonaventura scored a powerful header and assisted Jérémy Ménez's goal as Milan defeated Napoli 2–0; Bonaventura was also voted man of the match against Napoli and again in the next week against Roma. The following match against Sassuolo, he scored a goal and later in the match he received a second yellow card and was sent off. It was the first time in his career that he was sent off. On 30 May, he scored twice against his former team Atalanta in a 3–1 victory. Bonaventura finished his first season at Milan with 7 goals and 4 assists in all competitions.

==== 2015–16 season ====
On 23 August 2015, Bonaventura made his season debut as Milan lost 2–0 to Fiorentina. The following match against Empoli, Bonaventura came on the pitch as the substitute for Suso in the 55th minute and managed to assist Luiz Adriano's winning goal from a corner kick 15 minutes later. On 19 September, Bonaventura assisted Carlos Bacca's first goal and scored directly from a free-kick in a 3–2 win over Palermo. He also gained another assist and goal in Milan's next game, the 2–3 win over Udinese. Once again, he assisted both Carlos Bacca's and Philippe Mexès' goals against Lazio in the 3–1 away win on 1 November. He continued to perform well under the team's coach Siniša Mihajlović and became a fundamental player for his team throughout the season. After missing a 0–0 draw against his former team Atalanta through suspension, he scored the opener in a 4–1 defeat of Sampdoria on 28 November. He scored again in his next game on 1 December, a 3–1 Coppa Italia defeat of Crotone, via a brilliant 20-yard free kick. On 20 December he assisted Carlos Bacca's goal and scored a late goal as Milan beat Frosinone 4–2. On 17 January 2016, he provided another assist for Carlos Bacca as the Rossoneri beat Fiorentina 2–0. He ended the season with 7 goals and 8 assists in all competitions as Milan finished 7th in Serie A, and lost out in the Coppa Italia final against Juventus, following a 1–0 defeat in extra time.

==== 2016–17 season ====
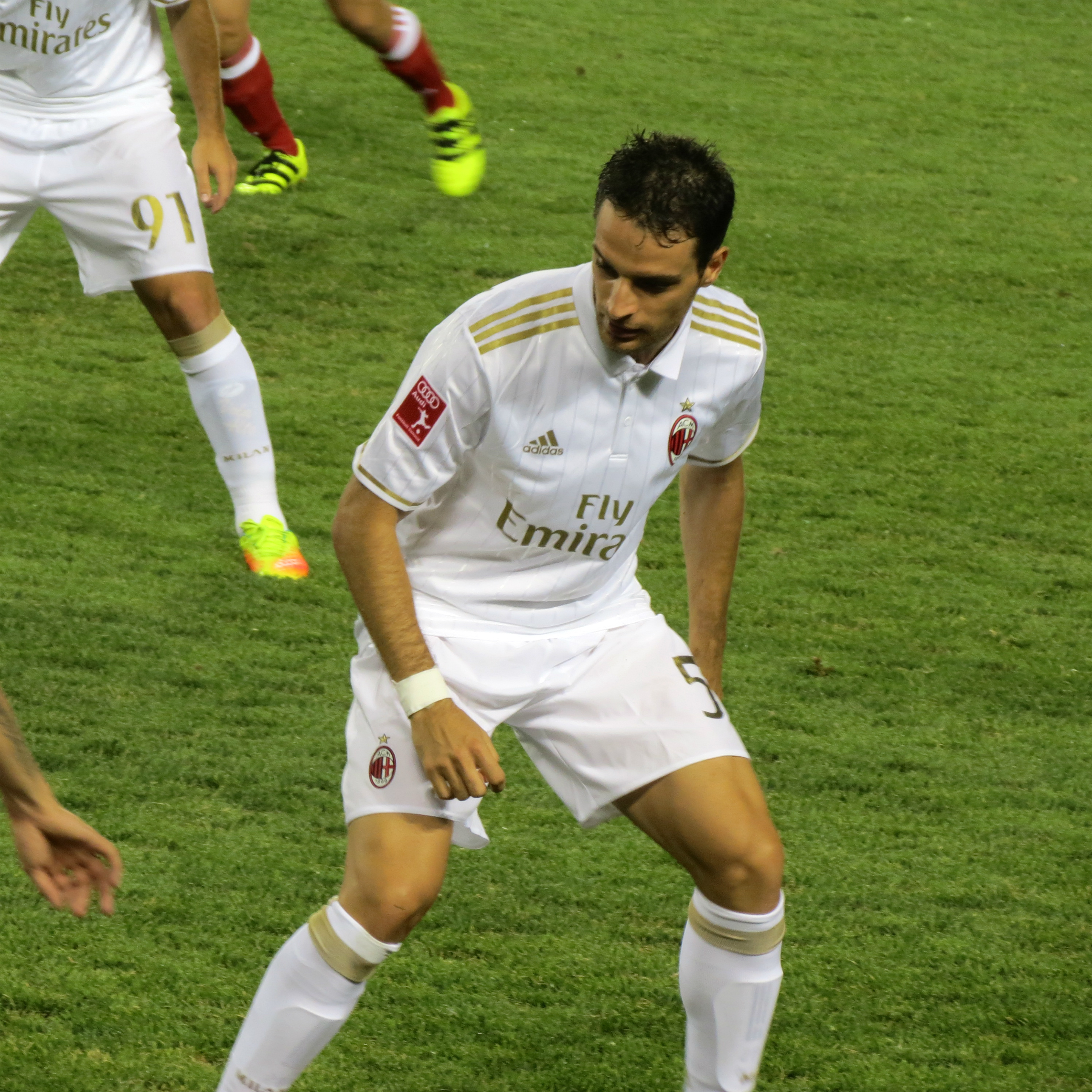
Giacomo Bonaventura playing for Milan against Bayern Munich in pre-season.

At the beginning of the season, Bonaventura switched his number from 28 to 5. He started Milan's opening match of the Serie A season against Torino. In the second half of the match, he was fouled inside the six-yard box by Joel Obi and Milan was given a penalty which was converted by Carlos Bacca to complete his hat-trick in Milan's 3–2 win. He scored his first goal of the season on 2 October in Milan's memorable comeback against Sassuolo as the game finished 4–3. The following week he assisted M'Baye Niang's goal against ChievoVerona in a 3–1 win. He also assisted Suso's first goal in the 2–2 draw against city rivals, Inter. On 23 December 2016, Bonaventura scored the equalising goal in the Supercoppa Italiana against Juventus; he later netted his penalty in the resulting shoot-out, helping Milan to a 4–3 victory. He signed a contract extension through 2020 with Milan on 18 January 2017. On 29 January, Bonaventura suffered an injury in a match against Udinese which ruled him out for the rest of the season following surgery on a thigh injury; earlier in that match, he scored Milan's goal in the 2–1 loss. He returned to the squad for the last game of the season against Cagliari on 28 May, but couldn't make an appearance during the match as Milan lost 2–1. He ended the season with 5 goals and 4 assists in 22 appearances in all competition as Milan finished 6th in Serie A, was knocked out of Coppa Italia in quarter-finals by eventual champions Juventus, and also won the Supercoppa Italiana.

==== 2017–18 season ====
Bonaventura played his first game in Europe in a 1–0 win against CS U Craiova in the first leg of Milan's Europa League qualification match on 27 July 2017. He also featured in the second leg the following week, in which he scored the first goal in their 2–0 win. It was his first goal in a European competition and he was voted Man of the Match thereafter for his performance. On 17 August, he got a late injury in Milan's Europa league playoff match against Shkëndija. On 14 September 2017, Bonaventura made his 100th Milan appearance, in a 5–1 away win against FK Austria Wien. His first goal of the season in Serie A against Benevento on 3 December. The following week he scored a brace in a 2–1 win against Bologna. On 6 January 2018, he made his 100th appearance in Serie A for Milan in a 1–0 win against Crotone. He played his 200th match in Serie A on in the 2–1 victory over Cagliari on 21 January 2018.

==== 2018–19 season ====
Bonaventura scored in Milan's opening fixture of the season against Napoli on 25 August. He followed up with goals against Atalanta and Chievo on 23 September and 7 October 2018. In October 2018, he suffered a knee injury that was expected to keep him out of play for nine months. Bonaventura did not return to training with the first team for the rest of the season.

==== 2019–20 season ====
Bonaventura made his first appearance for the season in Round 5 of the 2019–20 Serie A season on 26 September 2019, 11 months after his last appearance for the club. On 23 November 2019, he scored his first goal since 7 October 2018 in a 1–1 draw against Napoli. He scored the winner against Bologna in a 3–2 win two weeks later. He was released by Milan at the end of the season, following the expiration of his contract. His last appearance for the club was as a substitute in a 3–0 win against Cagliari at the final day of the season, coming on for Rafael Leão in the 38th minute.

=== Fiorentina ===
In September 2020, Bonaventura signed for Fiorentina on a two-year contract and scored and assisted six goals in thirty-four league matches as Fiorentina finished 13th in Serie A. Despite equalising for Fiorentina in the UEFA Conference League Final against West Ham United on 7 June 2023, making the scoreline 1–1, Fiorentina suffered heartbreak as Jarrod Bowen scored a late winner for West Ham in the 90th minute.

On 29 May, Bonaventura also started in Fiorentina's 1–0 extra-time defeat to Olympiacos in the 2024 UEFA Europa Conference League final.

=== Al-Shabab ===
On 5 August 2024, Saudi Pro League club Al-Shabab signed Bonaventura on a one-year contract, with an option for a second year. He departed the club in the summer of 2025 as a free agent.

On 5 March 2026, Bonaventura officially announced his retirement from professional football at the age of 36.

== International career ==
After featuring with under-19, under-20 levels, Bonaventura made his debut with the senior squad on 31 May 2013, in a 4–0 friendly victory against San Marino in Bologna, under Cesare Prandelli. His second appearance for Italy came 16 months later, in a friendly against Albania, during which he managed to assist Stefano Okaka's match–winning goal in a 1–0 victory in Genoa. In May 2016, he was named to Antonio Conte's preliminary 30-man Italy squad for UEFA Euro 2016. However he was later left out of the final 23-man squad for the tournament.

At 34 years, one month and 22 days, Bonaventura became the oldest player to score his debut goal for Italy when he found the back of the net against Malta in a Euro 2024 qualifier at Stadio San Nicola in Bari on 14 October 2023. The record had been held by Sassuolo striker Ciccio Caputo since 7 October 2020 after he tallied his inaugural goal at age 33 years and 62 days on 7 October 2020 in 6–0 friendly victory over Moldova.

== Style of play ==
Being an offensive midfielder, Bonaventura played in several midfield positions; in addition to his favoured central position as a trequartista behind the strikers, he was often deployed as a central midfielder, in the mezzala role, or as a left winger, or on the left in an attacking trident. He was also deployed in a box-to-box role on occasion, a position in which he was described as a tuttocampista in the Italian media. He was sometimes called the nickname "Jack" (from the poker card, which is also an Anglicized abbreviation of his name) in the media.

== Career statistics ==
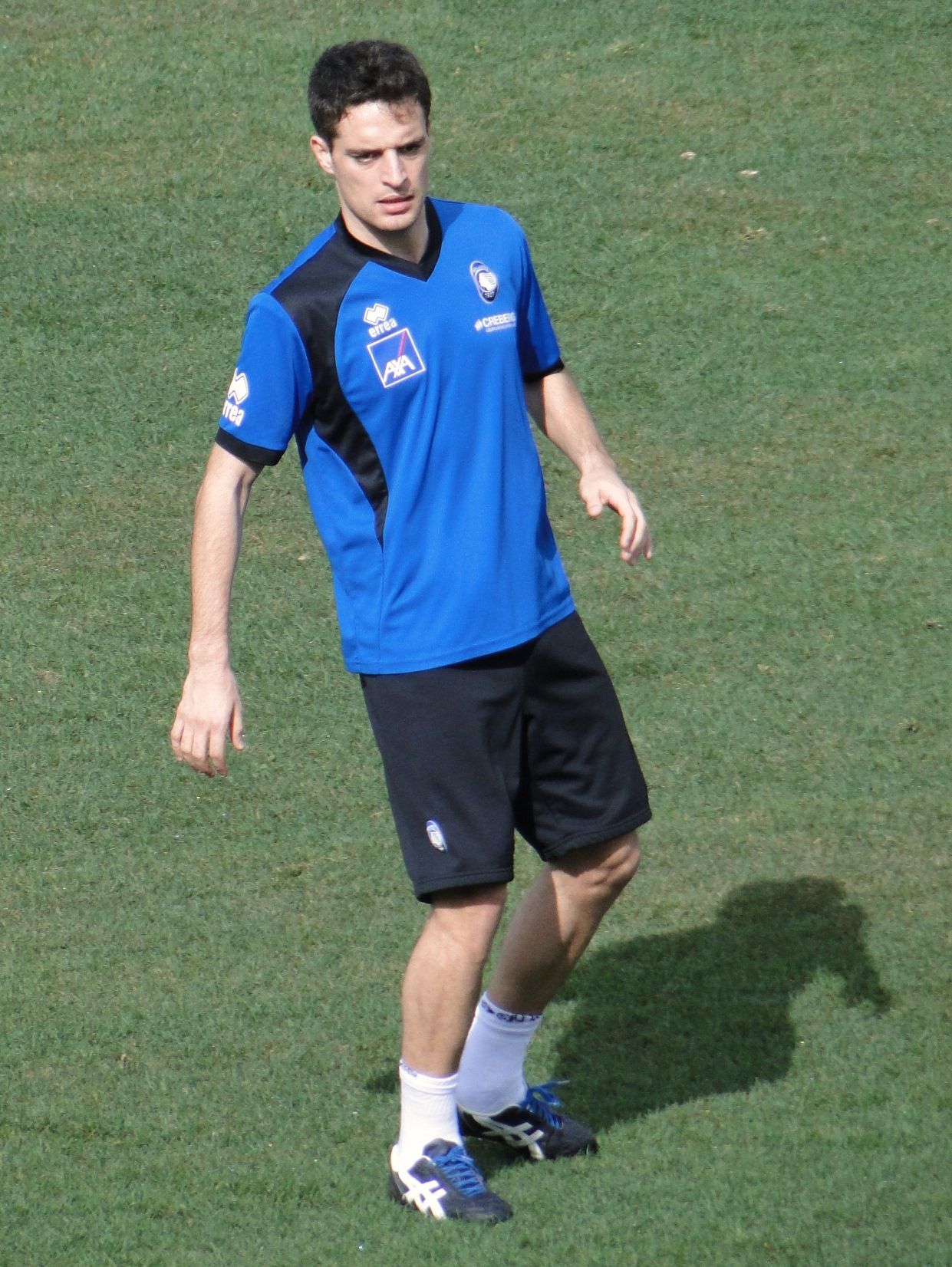
Bonaventura playing for Atalanta in 2013

=== Club ===
Appearances and goals by club, season and competition
Club	Season	League			National cup (Note: Includes Coppa Italia, King's Cup)		Continental		Other		Total	
Club	Season	Division	Apps	Goals	Apps	Goals	Apps	Goals	Apps	Goals	Apps	Goals
Atalanta	2007–08	Serie A	1	0	0	0	—		—		1	0
Atalanta	2008–09	Serie A	1	0	0	0	—		—		1	0
Atalanta	2009–10	Serie A	1	0	0	0	—		—		1	0
Atalanta	2010–11	Serie B	31	9	2	0	—		—		33	9
Atalanta	2011–12	Serie A	29	2	1	0	—		—		30	2
Atalanta	2012–13	Serie A	35	7	1	1	—		—		36	8
Atalanta	2013–14	Serie A	31	5	0	0	—		—		31	5
Atalanta	2014–15	Serie A	1	0	1	0	—		—		2	0
Atalanta	Total		130	23	5	1	—		—		135	24
Pergocrema (loan)	2008–09	Lega Pro	3	1	0	0	—		—		3	1
Padova (loan)	2009–10	Serie B	16	0	0	0	—		2 (Note: Appearances in Serie B relegation play-offs)	1	18	1
Milan	2014–15	Serie A	33	7	1	0	—		—		34	7
Milan	2015–16	Serie A	33	6	6	1	—		—		39	7
Milan	2016–17	Serie A	19	3	2	1	—		1 (Note: Appearance in Supercoppa Italiana)	1	22	5
Milan	2017–18	Serie A	33	8	5	0	9 (Note: Appearances in UEFA Europa League)	1	—		47	9
Milan	2018–19	Serie A	8	3	0	0	2	0	—		10	3
Milan	2019–20	Serie A	29	3	3	1	—		—		32	4
Milan	Total		155	30	17	3	11	1	1	1	184	35
Fiorentina	2020–21	Serie A	34	3	1	0	—		—		35	3
Fiorentina	2021–22	Serie A	31	4	4	0	—		—		35	4
Fiorentina	2022–23	Serie A	30	5	4	0	15 (Note: Appearances in UEFA Europa Conference League)	2	—		49	7
Fiorentina	2023–24	Serie A	31	8	3	0	8	0	1	0	43	8
Fiorentina	Total		126	20	12	0	23	2	1	0	162	22
Al-Shabab	2024–25	Saudi Pro League	29	2	4	2	—		—		33	4
Career total			459	76	38	6	34	3	4	2	535	87

=== International ===
Appearances and goals by national team and year
National team	Year	Apps	Goals
Italy	2013	1	0
Italy	2014	1	0
Italy	2016	6	0
Italy	2017	0	0
Italy	2018	6	0
Italy	2019	0	0
Italy	2020	1	0
Italy	2021	0	0
Italy	2022	0	0
Italy	2023	2	1
Italy	2024	1	0
Total		18	1

Scores and results list Italy's goal tally first.

List of international goals scored by Giacomo Bonaventura
No.	Date	Venue	Opponent	Score	Result	Competition
1	14 October 2023	Stadio San Nicola, Bari, Italy	Malta	1–0	4–0	UEFA Euro 2024 qualifying

== Honours ==
Atalanta

- Serie B: 2010–11

AC Milan

- Supercoppa Italiana: 2016
- Coppa Italia runner-up: 2015–16, 2017–18

Fiorentina

- Coppa Italia runner-up: 2022–23
- UEFA Europa Conference League runner-up: 2022–23, 2023–24

Italy U20

- Mediterranean Games silver medalist: 2009

Individual

- Premio Gentleman: 2016
