= 2022–23 Al-Ittihad Club season =

Al-Ittihad
2022–23 season
- President: Anmar Al-Hailiy
- Manager: Nuno Espírito Santo
- Stadium: King Abdullah Sports City
- Pro League: 1st
- King Cup: Semi-finals (knocked out by Al-Hilal)
- Super Cup: Winners
- Top goalscorer: League: Abderrazak Hamdallah (21); All: Abderrazak Hamdallah (25)
- Highest home attendance: 59,892 (vs. Al-Tai, 31 May 2023)
- Lowest home attendance: 19,694 (vs. Al-Fayha, 19 January 2023)
- Average home league attendance: 40,453
Home colours	Away colours	Third colours

The 2022–23 season was Al-Ittihad's 47th consecutive season in the top flight of Saudi football and 95th year in existence as a football club. The club participated in the Pro League, the King Cup, and the Super Cup.

The season covered the period from 1 July 2022 to 30 June 2023.

== Players ==
=== Squad information ===
As of 1 February 2023

Note: Flags indicate national team as defined under FIFA eligibility rules; some limited exceptions apply. Players may hold more than one non-FIFA nationality.

No.	Pos.	Nation	Player
3	MF	EGY	Tarek Hamed
5	DF	KSA	Omar Hawsawi
7	MF	KSA	Moatasem Seddiq
9	FW	MAR	Abderrazak Hamdallah
10	MF	BRA	Igor Coronado
11	MF	KSA	Abdulaziz Al-Bishi
12	DF	KSA	Zakaria Hawsawi (on loan from Ohod)
13	DF	KSA	Muhannad Al-Shanqeeti
14	MF	KSA	Awad Al-Nashri
15	MF	KSA	Abdulelah Al-Shehri
16	MF	KSA	Abdulkareem Al-Maghrabi
17	MF	ANG	Hélder Costa (on loan from Leeds United)
19	MF	BRA	Bruno Henrique
20	DF	KSA	Ahmed Sharahili
21	GK	KSA	Abdullah Al-Jadaani

No.	Pos.	Nation	Player
24	MF	KSA	Abdulrahman Al-Aboud
26	DF	EGY	Ahmed Hegazi (captain)
27	DF	KSA	Hamdan Al-Shamrani
33	DF	KSA	Madallah Al-Olayan
34	GK	BRA	Marcelo Grohe
36	MF	KSA	Marwan Al-Sahafi
37	DF	KSA	Suwailem Al-Menhali
38	DF	KSA	Sultan Al-Sulayli
44	MF	EGY	Noureddine El Bahhar
70	FW	KSA	Haroune Camara
80	FW	KSA	Mohammed Al-Saiari
88	GK	KSA	Osama Al-Marmash
90	FW	BRA	Romarinho
95	DF	KSA	Ahmed Bamsaud

=== Out on loan ===
Note: Flags indicate national team as defined under FIFA eligibility rules; some limited exceptions apply. Players may hold more than one non-FIFA nationality.

No.	Pos.	Nation	Player
4	DF	KSA	Ziyad Al-Sahafi (at Al-Taawoun until 30 June 2023)
6	MF	KSA	Khaled Al-Samiri (at Al-Khaleej until 30 June 2023)
15	MF	KSA	Mohammed Sawaan (at Al-Kholood until 30 June 2023)
22	GK	KSA	Saleh Al-Ohaymid (at Al-Kholood until 30 June 2023)
23	DF	KSA	Mohammed Al-Oufi (at Al-Adalah until 30 June 2023)
25	DF	KSA	Naif Asiri (at Al-Lewaa until 30 June 2023)
32	DF	KSA	Hazim Al-Zahrani (at Ohod until 30 June 2023)
35	DF	KSA	Hussain Al-Eisa (at Hajer until 30 June 2023)
41	GK	KSA	Raghdan Matri (at Al-Bukiryah until 30 June 2023)
—	GK	KSA	Mohammed Abo Asidah (at Wej until 30 June 2023)

No.	Pos.	Nation	Player
—	GK	KSA	Malek Tolah (at Al-Kholood until 30 June 2023)
—	DF	KSA	Aseel Abed (at Al-Okhdood until 30 June 2023)
—	DF	KSA	Hassan Al-Asmari (at Najran until 30 June 2023)
—	DF	KSA	Basil Al-Hedaif (at Al-Bukiryah until 30 June 2023)
—	MF	KSA	Younes Abdulwahed (at Jeddah until 30 June 2023)
—	MF	KSA	Abdulaziz Al-Dhuwayhi (at Jeddah until 30 June 2023)
—	MF	KSA	Abdulelah Hawsawi (at Jeddah until 30 June 2023)
—	MF	KSA	Meshal Sani (at Al-Bukiryah until 30 June 2023)
—	FW	KSA	Abdulaziz Al-Hassani (at Wej until 30 June 2023)

== Transfers and loans ==
=== Transfers in ===
Entry date	Position	No.	Player	From club	Fee	Ref.
30 June 2022	GK	22	(Saudi Arabia) Malek Tolah	(Saudi Arabia) Al-Kholood	End of loan	
30 June 2022	DF	–	(Saudi Arabia) Aseel Abed	(Spain) UD Melilla	End of loan	
30 June 2022	MF	15	(Saudi Arabia) Mohammed Sawaan	(Saudi Arabia) Al-Kholood	End of loan	
30 June 2022	MF	28	(Saudi Arabia) Essam Al-Muwallad	(Saudi Arabia) Al-Kholood	End of loan	
30 June 2022	MF	55	(Saudi Arabia) Saher Al-Suraihi	(Saudi Arabia) Al-Kawkab	End of loan	
30 June 2022	MF	98	(Saudi Arabia) Abdulmajeed Al-Zahrani	(Saudi Arabia) Al-Okhdood	End of loan	
30 June 2022	MF	–	(Saudi Arabia) Abdulaziz Al-Dhuwayhi	(Saudi Arabia) Al-Shoulla	End of loan	
30 June 2022	MF	–	(Saudi Arabia) Ali Al-Rie	(Saudi Arabia) Al-Ain	End of loan	
30 June 2022	MF	–	(Saudi Arabia) Abdulelah Hawsawi	(Saudi Arabia) Jeddah	End of loan	
30 June 2022	FW	–	(Saudi Arabia) Abdulaziz Al-Aryani	(Saudi Arabia) Al-Batin	End of loan	
1 July 2022	DF	20	(Saudi Arabia) Ahmed Sharahili	(Saudi Arabia) Al-Shabab	Free	
24 July 2022	MF	3	(Egypt) Tarek Hamed	(Egypt) Zamalek	Free	
24 August 2022	FW	80	(Saudi Arabia) Mohammed Al-Saiari	(Saudi Arabia) Al-Faisaly	$665,000	
29 August 2022	GK	21	(Saudi Arabia) Abdullah Al-Jadaani	(Saudi Arabia) Al-Hilal	Free	
29 August 2022	DF	95	(Saudi Arabia) Ahmed Bamsaud	(Saudi Arabia) Al-Fayha	$1,600,000	
28 January 2023	DF	32	(Saudi Arabia) Hazim Al-Zahrani	(Saudi Arabia) Al-Khaleej	End of loan	

=== Loans in ===
Start date	End date	Position	No.	Player	From club	Fee	Ref.
6 July 2022	End of season	DF	12	(Saudi Arabia) Zakaria Hawsawi	(Saudi Arabia) Ohod	$480,000	
7 August 2022	End of season	MF	17	(Angola) Hélder Costa	(England) Leeds United	Undisclosed	

=== Transfers out ===
Exit date	Position	No.	Player	To club	Fee	Ref.
30 June 2022	DF	17	(Saudi Arabia) Abdullah Al-Hafith	(Saudi Arabia) Al-Wehda	End of loan	
30 June 2022	MF	30	(Portugal) André André	(Portugal) Vitória	End of loan	
6 July 2022	DF	21	(Saudi Arabia) Abdulmohsen Fallatah	(Saudi Arabia) Al-Tai	Free	
24 July 2022	MF	16	(Saudi Arabia) Abdulaziz Al-Jebreen	(Saudi Arabia) Al-Batin	Free	
21 August 2022	MF	98	(Saudi Arabia) Abdulmajeed Al-Zahrani	(Saudi Arabia) Al-Ain	Free	
27 August 2022	GK	1	(Saudi Arabia) Rakan Al-Najjar	(Saudi Arabia) Al-Riyadh	Free	
28 August 2022	MF	8	(Saudi Arabia) Fahad Al-Muwallad	(Saudi Arabia) Al-Shabab	Free	
8 September 2022	FW	–	(Saudi Arabia) Abdulaziz Al-Aryani	(Saudi Arabia) Al-Riyadh	Free	
29 January 2023	MF	–	(Saudi Arabia) Ali Al-Rie	(Saudi Arabia) Al-Taraji	Free	

=== Loans out ===
Start date	End date	Position	No.	Player	To club	Fee	Ref.
1 July 2022	End of season	GK	22	(Saudi Arabia) Malek Tolah	(Saudi Arabia) Al-Kholood	None	
1 July 2022	End of season	MF	15	(Saudi Arabia) Mohammed Sawaan	(Saudi Arabia) Al-Kholood	None	
8 July 2022	End of season	DF	–	(Saudi Arabia) Aseel Abed	(Saudi Arabia) Al-Okhdood	None	
19 July 2022	End of season	DF	–	(Saudi Arabia) Hassan Al-Asmari	(Saudi Arabia) Najran	None	
30 July 2022	End of season	MF	–	(Saudi Arabia) Meshal Sani	(Saudi Arabia) Al-Bukiryah	None	
30 July 2022	30 January 2023	FW	–	(Saudi Arabia) Abdulaziz Al-Hassani	(Saudi Arabia) Al-Bukiryah	None	
2 August 2022	28 January 2023	DF	32	(Saudi Arabia) Hazim Al-Zahrani	(Saudi Arabia) Al-Khaleej	None	
18 August 2022	End of season	DF	23	(Saudi Arabia) Mohammed Al-Oufi	(Saudi Arabia) Al-Adalah	$80,000	
20 August 2022	End of season	MF	–	(Saudi Arabia) Abdulelah Hawsawi	(Saudi Arabia) Jeddah	None	
21 August 2022	End of season	MF	–	(Saudi Arabia) Abdulaziz Al-Dhuwayhi	(Saudi Arabia) Jeddah	None	
27 August 2022	End of season	MF	6	(Saudi Arabia) Khaled Al-Samiri	(Saudi Arabia) Al-Khaleej	None	
29 August 2022	End of season	GK	41	(Saudi Arabia) Raghdan Matri	(Saudi Arabia) Al-Bukiryah	None	
31 August 2022	End of season	DF	4	(Saudi Arabia) Ziyad Al-Sahafi	(Saudi Arabia) Al-Taawoun	None	
31 August 2022	End of season	MF	35	(Saudi Arabia) Hussain Al-Eisa	(Saudi Arabia) Hajer	None	
3 September 2022	31 January 2023	DF	25	(Saudi Arabia) Naif Asiri	(Saudi Arabia) Al-Shoulla	None	
6 September 2022	End of season	DF	–	(Saudi Arabia) Basil Al-Hedaif	(Saudi Arabia) Al-Bukiryah	None	
27 September 2022	End of season	GK	–	(Saudi Arabia) Mohammed Abo Asidah	(Saudi Arabia) Wej	None	
9 January 2023	End of season	GK	22	(Saudi Arabia) Saleh Al-Ohaymid	(Saudi Arabia) Al-Kholood	None	
26 January 2023	End of season	MF	29	(Saudi Arabia) Ahmed Bahusayn	(Saudi Arabia) Hajer	None	
28 January 2023	End of season	DF	32	(Saudi Arabia) Hazim Al-Zahrani	(Saudi Arabia) Ohod	None	
31 January 2023	End of season	FW	–	(Saudi Arabia) Abdulaziz Al-Hassani	(Saudi Arabia) Wej	None	
2 February 2023	End of season	DF	25	(Saudi Arabia) Naif Asiri	(Saudi Arabia) Al-Lewaa	None	

== Pre-season ==
30 July 2022 Friendly	Al-Ittihad (Saudi Arabia)	1–0	(Switzerland) FC Luzern	Nenzing, Austria
16:00 CEST	Hamdallah 5'	Report		Stadium: Sportplatz FC Nenzing

7 August 2022 Friendly	Al-Ittihad (Saudi Arabia)	4–3	(Austria) Red Bull Salzburg	Austria
15:00 CEST	Romarinho 4', 32'; Sharahili 27'; Camara 58'	Report

12 August 2022 Friendly	Al-Ittihad (Saudi Arabia)	1–1	(United Arab Emirates) Al-Wahda	Eggendorf, Austria
16:00 CEST	Romarinho 21'	Report	Matar 31'	Stadium: Sportplatz Eggendorf

19 August 2022 Friendly	Al-Ittihad (Saudi Arabia)	2–1	(Saudi Arabia) Abha	Jeddah, Saudi Arabia
19:30 AST	Henrique 19'; Hamed 39'	Report	Sami 4'	Stadium: Al-Ittihad Club Stadium

== Competitions ==
=== Overview ===
Competition	Record							
Competition	G	W	D	L	GF	GA	GD	Win %
Pro League	30	22	6	2	60	13	+47	73.33
King Cup	3	0	2	1	2	3	−1	0.00
Super Cup	2	2	0	0	5	1	+4	100.00
Total	35	24	8	3	67	17	+50	68.57

Updated to match played 31 May 2023
Source: Competitions

=== Pro League ===
==== League table ====
Pos	Team	Pld	W	D	L	GF	GA	GD	Pts	Qualification or relegation
1	Al-Ittihad (C, Q)	30	22	6	2	60	13	+47	72	Qualified for the AFC Champions League group stage and the 2023 FIFA Club World Cup
2	Al-Nassr	30	20	7	3	63	18	+45	67	Qualified for the AFC Champions League play-off round
3	Al-Hilal (Note: Al-Hilal qualified for the AFC Champions League group stage as the 2022–23 King Cup winners.)	30	17	8	5	54	29	+25	59	Qualified for the AFC Champions League group stage
4	Al-Shabab	30	17	5	8	57	33	+24	56	
5	Al-Taawoun	30	16	7	7	46	34	+12	55	

Updated to match(es) played on 31 May 2023. Source: SPL
Rules for classification: 1) Points; 2) Head-to-head points; 3) Head-to-head goal difference; 4) Total goal difference; 5) Total goals scored; 6) Fair-play points (Note: Head-to-head record is used only after all the matches between the teams in question have been played).
(C) Champions; (Q) Qualified for the phase indicated

==== Results summary ====
Overall								Home						Away					
Pld	W	D	L	GF	GA	GD	Pts	W	D	L	GF	GA	GD	W	D	L	GF	GA	GD
30	22	6	2	60	13	+47	72	12	2	1	30	3	+27	10	4	1	30	10	+20

Last updated: 31 May 2023.
Source: spl.com.sa

==== Results by round ====
Round	1	2	3	4	5	6	7	8	9	10	11	12	13	14	15	16	17	18	19	20	21	22	23	24	25	26	27	28	29	30
Ground	A	H	A	H	A	H	A	H	A	H	A	H	A	H	A	H	A	H	A	H	A	H	A	H	A	H	A	H	A	H
Result	W	D	W	W	D	W	D	W	D	W	W	L	W	W	W	W	W	D	W	W	W	W	W	W	L	W	D	W	W	W
Position	1	6	3	3	3	2	3	3	5	3	3	4	3	3	3	2	2	2	2	1	1	1	1	1	1	1	1	1	1	1

Updated to match(es) played on 31 May 2023. Source: spl.com.sa
A = Away; H = Home; W = Win; D = Draw; L = Loss

==== Matches ====
All times are local, AST (UTC+3).

Win Draw Loss Postponed

26 August 2022 1	Al-Adalah	0–3	Al-Ittihad	Al-Hasa
18:45	Lenis (yellow card) 90+3'; Al-Shangeati (yellow card) 90+4'	Report	Sharahili 15'; Al-Aboud (yellow card) 67'; Camara 90'; Al-Shamrani 90+5'	Stadium: Prince Abdullah bin Jalawi Stadium; Attendance: 16,250; Referee: Slavko Vinčić (Slovenia)

3 September 2022 2	Al-Ittihad	0–0	Al-Ettifaq	Jeddah
21:00	Romarinho (yellow card) 86'	Report	Al-Obaid (yellow card) 35'; Tisserand (yellow card) 86'; Niakaté (yellow card) 90+4'	Stadium: King Abdullah Sports City; Attendance: 33,556; Referee: Daniele Orsato (Italy)

9 September 2022 3	Al-Raed	0–1	Al-Ittihad	Buraidah
21:00	Al-Farhan (yellow card) 74'; Khamis (yellow card) 89'	Report	Al-Shamrani (yellow card) 37'; Hegazi (yellow card) 40', (goal) 66'; Hamed (yellow card) 90+1'	Stadium: King Abdullah Sport City Stadium; Attendance: 10,856; Referee: Andrés Matonte (Uruguay)

15 September 2022 4	Al-Ittihad	2–0	Al-Khaleej	Jeddah
21:00	Hamdallah 4', 69'; Al-Nashri (yellow card) 45+4'; Al-Shamrani (yellow card) 90+5'	Report	Souza (yellow card) 56'; Anthony (yellow card) 68'; Al-Zahrani (red card) 73'	Stadium: King Abdullah Sports City; Attendance: 25,049; Referee: Fernando Rapallini (Argentine)

2 October 2022 5	Al-Nassr	0–0	Al-Ittihad	Riyadh
21:00	Talisca (yellow card) 22'; Álvaro (yellow card) 30'; Al-Sulaiheem (red card) 59'	Report	Al-Nashri (yellow card) 37'; Al-Aboud (yellow card) 37'; Hamed (red card) 43'; Bamsaud (yellow card) 53'; Hegazi (yellow card) 56'	Stadium: Mrsool Park; Attendance: 23,025; Referee: Andrés Cunha (Uruguay)

7 October 2022 6	Al-Ittihad	3–1	Al-Fateh	Jeddah
21:00	Romarinho 32'; Al-Shamrani (yellow card) 45+3'; Coronado (yellow card) 49', (goal) 86'; Hamdallah 69'; Grohe (yellow card) 90'	Report	Vélez (yellow card) 32'; Al-Fuhaid (yellow card) 45+5'; Kanabah 61'	Stadium: King Abdullah Sports City; Attendance: 32,374; Referee: Georgi Kabakov (Bulgaria)

11 October 2022 7	Damac	1–1	Al-Ittihad	Abha
18:15	Zeghba (yellow card) 61'; Duarte 67'; Al-Shammeri (yellow card) 85'	Report	Hamdallah 45+1'; Al-Shamrani (yellow card) 82'	Stadium: Prince Sultan bin Abdul Aziz Stadium; Attendance: 13,266; Referee: Tamás Bognár (Hungary)

16 October 2022 8	Al-Ittihad	1–0	Al-Wehda	Jeddah
20:30	Al-Aboud (yellow card) 44' (yellow-red card) 45+2'; Hegazi 80'; Hamed (yellow card) 82'	Report	Botía (yellow card) 37'; Rodrigues (red card) 85'; Al-Najei (yellow card) 90+4'	Stadium: King Abdullah Sports City; Attendance: 35,933; Referee: Radu Petrescu (Romania)

26 December 2022 10	Al-Ittihad	3–0	Al-Taawoun	Jeddah
18:00	Costa 38'; Hamdallah 73', 90+9' (pen.)	Report	Al-Nasser (yellow card) 45+3'; Kadesh (yellow card) 90'; Darwish (yellow card) 90+8'	Stadium: King Abdullah Sports City; Attendance: 20,297; Referee: Sven Jablonski (Germany)

31 December 2022 11	Abha	1–2	Al-Ittihad	Abha
15:30	Al-Amri 72'	Report	Hamdallah 21'; Romarinho 50', (yellow card) 52'; Hamed (yellow card) 56'	Stadium: Prince Sultan bin Abdul Aziz Stadium; Attendance: 12,215; Referee: Anastasios Sidiropoulos (Greece)

5 January 2023 12	Al-Ittihad	0–1	Al-Hilal	Jeddah
20:30	Hamed (yellow card) 31'	Report	Ighalo 12'; Al-Bulaihi (yellow card) 65'; Kanno (yellow card) 67'; Abdulhamid (yellow card) 68'; Al-Malki (yellow card) 90+2'	Stadium: King Abdullah Sports City; Attendance: 53,456; Referee: Daniele Orsato (Italy)

9 January 2023 9	Al-Shabab	1–1	Al-Ittihad	Riyadh
21:15	Guanca 22' (pen.); Santos (yellow card) 74'	Report	Hegazi (yellow card) 20', (goal) 24'; Al-Shanqeeti (yellow card) 45+1'	Stadium: Prince Faisal bin Fahd Stadium; Attendance: 6,361; Referee: Szymon Marciniak (Poland)

14 January 2023 13	Al-Batin	1–2	Al-Ittihad	Hafar al-Batin
15:30	Y. Al-Shammari 23'; Pedroza (yellow card) 37' (yellow-red card) 45+6'; López (yellow card) 45+9'; Al-Hurayji (yellow card) 75'	Report	Hamdallah 45+8' (pen.); Al-Aboud (yellow card) 45+9'; Romarinho 50' (pen.)	Stadium: Al-Batin Club Stadium; Attendance: 3,494; Referee: Anastasios Sidiropoulos (Greece)

19 January 2023 14	Al-Ittihad	3–0	Al-Fayha	Jeddah
18:00	Coronado 23'; Hamdallah 45+1' (pen.); Camara 45+3'; Z. Hawsawi (yellow card) 66'	Report	Ruiz (yellow card) 22'; Zidan (yellow card) 90+6'	Stadium: King Abdullah Sports City; Attendance: 19,694; Referee: Sandro Schärer (Switzerland)

4 February 2023 15	Al-Tai	0–1	Al-Ittihad	Ha'il
16:00	Martínez (yellow card) 49'; Fai (yellow card) 68'; Al-Sultan (yellow card) 90+3'	Report	Henrique (yellow card) 59'; Bamsaud (yellow card) 61'; Coronado 90+5'	Stadium: Prince Abdul Aziz bin Musa'ed Stadium; Attendance: 8,957; Referee: Srđan Jovanović (Serbia)

10 February 2023 16	Al-Ittihad	5–0	Al-Adalah	Jeddah
20:30	Romarinho 17'; Hamdallah 37', 67', (yellow card) 59'; Coronado 90+4' (pen.); Camara 90+8'	Report	Al-Harbi (yellow card) 54' (yellow-red card) 60'; Al-Sobhi (yellow card) 90+3'	Stadium: King Abdullah Sports City; Attendance: 53,990; Referee: Tamás Bognár (Hungary)

16 February 2023 17	Al-Ettifaq	0–3	Al-Ittihad	Dammam
20:30	Hawsawi (yellow card) 39'; Al-Ghamdi (yellow card) 70'	Report	Costa 19'; Romarinho 59'; Camara 67'; Grohe (yellow card) 77'; Hegazi (yellow card) 89'	Stadium: Prince Mohamed bin Fahd Stadium; Attendance: 14,135; Referee: Artur Soares Dias (Portugal)

23 February 2023 18	Al-Ittihad	0–0	Al-Raed	Jeddah
20:30	Sharahili (yellow card) 41'; Al-Saiari (yellow card) 90+1'	Report	Al-Farhan (yellow card) 21'; Sunbul (yellow card) 90+3'; Lung Jr. (yellow card) 90+6'	Stadium: King Abdullah Sports City; Attendance: 33,173; Referee: Sandro Schärer (Switzerland)

3 March 2023 19	Al-Khaleej	0–3	Al-Ittihad	Dammam
16:00	Al-Samiri (yellow card) 90+2'	Report	Hamdallah 54' (pen.); Romarinho 69'; Sharahili 73'	Stadium: Prince Mohamed bin Fahd Stadium; Attendance: 15,355; Referee: Bastian Dankert (Germany)

9 March 2023 20	Al-Ittihad	1–0	Al-Nassr	Jeddah
20:30	Bamsaud (yellow card) 68'; Romarinho 80'	Report	Konan (yellow card) 84'	Stadium: King Abdullah Sports City; Attendance: 57,244; Referee: Antonio Mateu Lahoz (Spain)

18 March 2023 21	Al-Fateh	1–5	Al-Ittihad	Al-Hasa
16:00	Al-Fuhaid (yellow card) 10'; Batna 41', (yellow card) 62'; Petros (yellow card) 50'	Report	Hamdallah 7', 50' (pen.), 90+8'; Costa (yellow card) 24'; Coronado (yellow card) 43', (goal) 90'; Sharahili 59'; Al-Olayan (yellow card) 88'	Stadium: Prince Abdullah bin Jalawi Stadium; Attendance: 14,695; Referee: Andrés Matonte (Uruguay)

4 April 2023 22	Al-Ittihad	3–0	Damac	Jeddah
22:00	Henrique 14'; Sharahili (yellow card) 18'; Bamsaud (yellow card) 21' (yellow-red card) 73'; Romarinho 37' (pen.); Hegazi 87'	Report	Munshi (yellow card) 39'; Al-Nakhli (yellow card) 75'	Stadium: King Abdullah Sports City; Attendance: 38,414; Referee: István Kovács (Romania)

9 April 2023 23	Al-Wehda	1–2	Al-Ittihad	Mecca
23:00	Kurdi (yellow card) 52'; Bakshween (yellow card) 63'; Beauguel 69'	Report	Hamdallah 20' (pen.), (yellow card) 84'; Henrique 30' (pen.); Hamed (yellow card) 42'; Hegazi (yellow card) 88'	Stadium: King Abdul Aziz Stadium; Attendance: 23,265; Referee: Artur Soares Dias (Portugal)

27 April 2023 24	Al-Ittihad	2–1	Al-Shabab	Jeddah
21:30	Hamdallah 18' (pen.), 90+16' (pen.), (yellow card) 90+12'; Coronado (yellow card) 41'; Grohe (yellow card) 50'; Hegazi (yellow card) 88'; Z. Hawsawi (red card) 90+5'	Report	Guanca 68' (pen.); Al-Tambakti (yellow card) 86'; Al-Qahtani (yellow card) 90+5'; Krychowiak (yellow card) 90+14'	Stadium: King Abdullah Sports City; Attendance: 49,915; Referee: Srđan Jovanović (Serbia)

3 May 2023 25	Al-Taawoun	2–1	Al-Ittihad	Buraidah
19:00	Al-Rashidi 17', 67'; Abdullah (yellow card) 83'; Al-Nabit (yellow card) 90+6'; Al-Najjar (yellow card) 90+10'; Al-Mutairi (red card) 90+15'	Report	Hamdallah 76'; Al-Bishi (yellow card) 90+5'; Henrique (yellow card) 90+6'	Stadium: King Abdullah Sport City Stadium; Attendance: 8,892; Referee: Bastian Dankert (Germany)

8 May 2023 26	Al-Ittihad	4–0	Abha	Jeddah
21:30	Romarinho 13', 30'; Hamdallah 18'; Al-Saiari 90+2'	Report	Sami (yellow card) 55'	Stadium: King Abdullah Sports City; Attendance: 39,038; Referee: Nikola Dabanović (Montenegro)

16 May 2023 27	Al-Hilal	2–2	Al-Ittihad	Riyadh
21:30	Jahfali (yellow card) 14'; Al-Juwayr 41'; Otayf (yellow card) 59'; Michael 90+4', (yellow card) 90+7'	Report	Coronado 8'; Bamsaud 30'; Al-Nashri (yellow card) 61'	Stadium: King Fahd International Stadium; Attendance: 15,325; Referee: Fernando Rapallini (Argentina)

23 May 2023 28	Al-Ittihad	1–0	Al-Batin	Jeddah
21:30	Romarinho 9'; Henrique (yellow card) 90+2'	Report	Al-Hurayji (yellow card) 45+2'; Al-Qarni (yellow card) 45+5'; Pedroza (yellow card) 70'	Stadium: King Abdullah Sports City; Attendance: 54,771; Referee: Tamás Bognár (Hungary)

27 May 2023 29	Al-Fayha	0–3	Al-Ittihad	Al Majma'ah
21:00	Nasser (yellow card) 45'	Report	Sharahili 3'; Romarinho 45+1', 85'; Al-Nashri (yellow card) 46'	Stadium: Al Majma'ah Sports City; Attendance: 6,231; Referee: Fábio Veríssimo (Portugal)

31 May 2023 30	Al-Ittihad	2–0	Al-Tai	Jeddah
21:00	Al-Olayan (yellow card) 45'; Henrique (yellow card) 50'; Bamsaud (yellow card) 57'; Hamdallah 73' (pen.); Costa 90+6'	Report	Qassem (yellow card) 90+8'	Stadium: King Abdullah Sports City; Attendance: 59,892; Referee: Abdullah Al-Shehri

=== King Cup ===
All times are local, AST (UTC+3).

22 December 2022 Round of 16	Al-Ittihad	1–1 (a.e.t.) (4–3 p)	Al-Shabab	Jeddah
21:00	Hegazi (yellow card) 45+3'; Hamdallah 48', (yellow card) 120+2'; Hamed (yellow card) 53'; Grohe (yellow card) 120+1'	Report	Al-Muwallad (yellow card) 25'; Al-Harbi 40', (yellow card) 90+8'; Krychowiak (yellow card) 45+8'; Al-Tambakti (yellow card) 120+1'	Stadium: King Abdullah Sports City; Attendance: 32,144; Referee: Georgi Kabakov (Bulgaria)
	Penalties
	Hamdallah (penalty scored); Al-Saiari (penalty scored); Al-Bishi (penalty scored); Al-Nashri (penalty missed); Romarinho (penalty scored)		(penalty scored) Guanca; (penalty scored) Bahebri; (penalty scored) Santos; (penalty missed) Krychowiak; (penalty missed) Banega

13 March 2023 Quarter-finals	Al-Fayha	1–1 (a.e.t.) (3–4 p)	Al-Ittihad	Al Majma'ah
17:30	Ruiz (yellow card) 15'; Ryller 45+5'; Al-Shuwaish (yellow card) 63'; Nwakaeme (yellow card) 64'; Al-Safri (yellow card) 69'; Nasser (yellow card) 83'	Report	Romarinho (yellow card) 14'; Camara 16'; Hamed (yellow card) 105'; Al-Bishi (yellow card) 117'; Al-Saiari (yellow card) 120+2'	Stadium: Al Majma'ah Sports City; Referee: Ivan Kružliak (Slovakia)
	Penalties
	Nwakaeme (penalty missed); Abousaban (penalty scored); Al-Shamekh (penalty scored); Zidan (penalty scored); Al-Baqawi (penalty missed)		(penalty scored) Hamdallah; (penalty scored) Coronado; (penalty scored) Al-Saiari; (penalty scored) Bamsaud

23 April 2023 Semi-finals	Al-Ittihad	0–1 (a.e.t.)	Al-Hilal	Jeddah
21:00	O. Hawsawi (yellow card) 88'	Report	Al-Shahrani (yellow card) 44'; Al-Breik (yellow card) 71'; Abdulhamid (yellow card) 90+12'; Cuéllar (yellow card) 104'; Hegazi 106' (o.g.)	Stadium: King Abdullah Sports City; Attendance: 53,642; Referee: Danny Makkelie (Netherlands)

=== Super Cup ===
All times are local, AST (UTC+3).

26 January 2023 Semi-finals	Al-Ittihad	3–1	Al-Nassr	Riyadh
21:00	Romarinho 15'; Hamdallah 43', (yellow card) 83'; Z. Hawsawi (yellow card) 76'; Al-Bishi (yellow card) 90+1'; Al-Shamrani (yellow card) 90+2'; Al-Shanqeeti 90+3'	Report	Al-Najei (yellow card) 27'; Gustavo (yellow card) 45+1'; Talisca 67'	Stadium: King Fahd International Stadium; Attendance: 49,477; Referee: Danny Makkelie (Netherlands)

29 January 2023 Final	Al-Ittihad	2–0	Al-Fayha	Riyadh
20:00	Hamdallah 3', 48'; Coronado (yellow card) 30'	Report	Al-Safri (red card) 24'	Stadium: King Fahd International Stadium; Attendance: 47,518; Referee: Fernando Rapallini (Argentina)

== Statistics ==
=== Appearances ===
Last updated on 31 May 2023.

No.	Pos	Nat	Player	Total		Pro League		King Cup		Super Cup	
No.	Pos	Nat	Player	Apps	Goals	Apps	Goals	Apps	Goals	Apps	Goals
Goalkeepers
21	GK	(Saudi Arabia) KSA	Abdullah Al-Jadaani	1	0	0+1	0	0	0	0	0
34	GK	(Brazil) BRA	Marcelo Grohe	35	0	30	0	3	0	2	0
88	GK	(Saudi Arabia) KSA	Osama Al-Marmash	0	0	0	0	0	0	0	0
Defenders
5	DF	(Saudi Arabia) KSA	Omar Hawsawi	22	0	14+5	0	1+1	0	0+1	0
12	DF	(Saudi Arabia) KSA	Zakaria Hawsawi	21	0	8+8	0	1+2	0	2	0
13	DF	(Saudi Arabia) KSA	Muhannad Al-Shanqeeti	14	1	8+3	0	1	0	2	1
20	DF	(Saudi Arabia) KSA	Ahmed Sharahili	27	4	23	4	2	0	2	0
26	DF	(Egypt) EGY	Ahmed Hegazi	33	4	28	4	3	0	2	0
27	DF	(Saudi Arabia) KSA	Hamdan Al-Shamrani	14	1	8+4	1	0	0	0+2	0
33	DF	(Saudi Arabia) KSA	Madallah Al-Olayan	27	0	17+7	0	2	0	0+1	0
37	DF	(Saudi Arabia) KSA	Suwailem Al-Menhali	3	0	1+1	0	0+1	0	0	0
38	DF	(Saudi Arabia) KSA	Sultan Al-Sulayli	0	0	0	0	0	0	0	0
95	DF	(Saudi Arabia) KSA	Ahmed Bamsaud	23	1	16+4	1	2+1	0	0	0
Midfielders
3	MF	(Egypt) EGY	Tarek Hamed	28	0	23+1	0	2	0	2	0
7	MF	(Saudi Arabia) KSA	Moatasem Seddiq	0	0	0	0	0	0	0	0
10	MF	(Brazil) BRA	Igor Coronado	33	6	28	6	3	0	2	0
11	MF	(Saudi Arabia) KSA	Abdulaziz Al-Bishi	21	0	9+7	0	0+3	0	0+2	0
14	MF	(Saudi Arabia) KSA	Awad Al-Nashri	24	0	6+14	0	1+2	0	0+1	0
15	MF	(Saudi Arabia) KSA	Abdulelah Al-Shehri	0	0	0	0	0	0	0	0
16	MF	(Saudi Arabia) KSA	Abdulkareem Al-Maghrabi	1	0	0+1	0	0	0	0	0
17	MF	(Angola) ANG	Hélder Costa	20	3	16+2	3	2	0	0	0
19	MF	(Brazil) BRA	Bruno Henrique	29	2	25	2	2	0	2	0
24	MF	(Saudi Arabia) KSA	Abdulrahman Al-Aboud	25	0	11+10	0	1+1	0	2	0
36	MF	(Saudi Arabia) KSA	Marwan Al-Sahafi	7	0	1+6	0	0	0	0	0
44	MF	(Egypt) EGY	Noureddine El Bahhar	0	0	0	0	0	0	0	0
Forwards
9	FW	(Morocco) MAR	Abderrazak Hamdallah	31	25	26	21	3	1	2	3
70	FW	(Saudi Arabia) KSA	Haroune Camara	21	5	4+13	4	1+1	1	0+2	0
80	FW	(Saudi Arabia) KSA	Mohammed Al-Saiari	12	1	0+10	1	0+2	0	0	0
90	FW	(Brazil) BRA	Romarinho	33	14	28	13	3	0	2	1

=== Goalscorers ===
Rank	No.	Pos	Nat	Name	Pro League	King Cup	Super Cup	Total
1	9	FW	(Morocco)	Abderrazak Hamdallah	21	1	3	25
2	90	FW	(Brazil)	Romarinho	13	0	1	14
3	10	MF	(Brazil)	Igor Coronado	6	0	0	6
4	70	FW	(Saudi Arabia)	Haroune Camara	4	1	0	5
5	20	DF	(Saudi Arabia)	Ahmed Sharahili	4	0	0	4
5	26	DF	(Egypt)	Ahmed Hegazi	4	0	0	4
7	17	MF	(Angola)	Hélder Costa	3	0	0	3
8	19	MF	(Brazil)	Bruno Henrique	2	0	0	2
9	13	DF	(Saudi Arabia)	Muhannad Al-Shanqeeti	0	0	1	1
9	27	DF	(Saudi Arabia)	Hamdan Al-Shamrani	1	0	0	1
9	80	FW	(Saudi Arabia)	Mohammed Al-Saiari	1	0	0	1
9	95	DF	(Saudi Arabia)	Ahmed Bamsaud	1	0	0	1
Own goal					0	0	0	0
Total					60	2	5	67

Last Updated: 31 May 2023

=== Assists ===
Rank	No.	Pos	Nat	Name	Pro League	King Cup	Super Cup	Total
1	10	MF	(Brazil)	Igor Coronado	13	1	1	15
2	90	FW	(Brazil)	Romarinho	5	0	3	8
3	20	DF	(Saudi Arabia)	Ahmed Sharahili	3	1	0	4
3	24	MF	(Saudi Arabia)	Abdulrahman Al-Aboud	3	0	1	4
5	9	FW	(Morocco)	Abderrazak Hamdallah	3	0	0	3
5	11	MF	(Saudi Arabia)	Abdulaziz Al-Bishi	3	0	0	3
7	27	DF	(Saudi Arabia)	Hamdan Al-Shamrani	2	0	0	2
8	13	DF	(Saudi Arabia)	Muhannad Al-Shanqeeti	1	0	0	1
8	17	MF	(Angola)	Hélder Costa	1	0	0	1
8	19	MF	(Brazil)	Bruno Henrique	1	0	0	1
8	26	DF	(Egypt)	Ahmed Hegazi	1	0	0	1
8	70	FW	(Saudi Arabia)	Haroune Camara	1	0	0	1
8	95	DF	(Saudi Arabia)	Ahmed Bamsaud	1	0	0	1
Total					38	2	5	45

Last Updated: 27 May 2023

=== Clean sheets ===
Rank	No.	Pos	Nat	Name	Pro League	King Cup	Super Cup	Total
1	34	GK	(Brazil)	Marcelo Grohe	19	0	1	20
2	21	GK	(Saudi Arabia)	Abdullah Al-Jadaani	1	0	0	1
Total					19	0	1	20

Last Updated: 31 May 2023
