= Ahmed Sharahili =

Saudi Arabian footballer

Personal information
- Full name: Ahmed Mohammed Sharahili
- Date of birth: 6 July 1994 (age 32)
- Place of birth: Riyadh, Saudi Arabia
- Height: 1.85 m (6 ft 1 in)
- Position: Centre-back

Team information
- Current team: Al-Ittihad
- Number: 20

Youth career
- 2009–2014: Al-Hilal

Senior career*
Years	Team	Apps	(Gls)
2014–2019	Al-Hilal	17	(0)
2017–2018	→ Al-Fateh (loan)	20	(0)
2019–2022	Al-Shabab	67	(4)
2022–	Al-Ittihad	48	(4)

International career^{‡}
2014–2017	Saudi Arabia U23		
2020–	Saudi Arabia	5	(0)
- * Club domestic league appearances and goals as of 22:10, 4 May 2026 (UTC) ‡ National team caps and goals as of 23:20, 28 March 2023 (UTC)

Ahmed Mohammed Sharahili (Arabic: أحمد محمد شراحيلي, born July 6, 1994) is a Saudi professional footballer who plays as a centre-back for the Saudi Arabia national team and Al-Ittihad.

== Career statistics ==
=== Club ===
As of match played 27 May 2024

Appearances and goals by club, season and competition
Club	Season	League		King Cup		Asia		Other		Total	
Club	Season	Apps	Goals	Apps	Goals	Apps	Goals	Apps	Goals	Apps	Goals
Al-Hilal	2013–14	1	0	0	0	0	0	0	0	1	0
Al-Hilal	2014–15	5	0	1	0	4	0	0	0	10	0
Al-Hilal	2015–16	7	0	2	0	3	0	2 (Note: Appearance(s) in Crown Prince Cup)	0	14	0
Al-Hilal	2016–17	2	0	1	0	1	0	0	0	4	0
Al-Hilal	2018–19	2	0	1	0	0	0	1 (Note: Appearance(s) in Arab Club Champions Cup)	0	4	0
Al-Hilal	Total	17	0	5	0	8	0	3	0	33	0
Al-Fateh (loan)	2017–18	20	0	2	0	—		1	0	23	0
Al-Shabab	2019–20	22	0	2	1	—		2	0	26	1
Al-Shabab	2020–21	23	2	0	0	—		2	0	25	2
Al-Shabab	2021–22	22	2	3	0	5	0	—		30	2
Al-Shabab	Total	67	4	5	1	5	0	4	0	81	5
Al-Ittihad	2022–23	23	4	2	0	—		2 (Note: Appearance(s) in Saudi Super Cup)	0	27	4
Al-Ittihad	2023–24	7	0	0	0	1	0	4	0	12	0
Al-Ittihad	Total	30	4	2	0	1	0	6	0	39	4
Career totals		134	8	14	1	14	0	14	0	176	9

=== International ===
Statistics accurate as of match played 28 March 2023.

Saudi Arabia
Year	Apps	Goals
2020	1	0
2021	0	0
2022	2	0
2023	2	0
Total	5	0

== Honours ==
Al-Hilal

- Saudi Professional League: 2016–17
- King Cup: 2015, 2017
- Crown Prince Cup: 2015–16
- Saudi Super Cup: 2015, 2018

Al-Ittihad

- Saudi Pro League: 2022–23, 2024–25
- King's Cup: 2024–25
- Saudi Super Cup: 2022
