= Younes Al-Shanqeeti =

Saudi Arabian footballer

Personal information
- Full name: Younes bin Abdulkarim bin Ahmed Al-Shanqeeti
- Date of birth: January 6, 2004 (age 22)
- Place of birth: Jeddah, Saudi Arabia
- Position: Midfielder

Team information
- Current team: Neom
- Number: 47

Youth career
- –2023: Al-Hilal
- 2023–2024: Al-Ahli

Senior career*
| Years | Team | Apps | (Gls) |
| 2024–2025 | Al-Ahli | 0 | (0) |
| 2024–2025 | → Al-Shabab (loan) | 6 | (0) |
| 2025– | Neom | 0 | (0) |

International career
| 2024– | Saudi Arabia U23 | 4 | (0) |
- * Club domestic league appearances and goals as of 22 July 2025

Younes Al-Shanqeeti (Arabic: يونس الشنقيطي; born 6 January 2004) is a Saudi Arabian professional footballer who plays as a Midfielder for Saudi Pro League side Neom.

== Club career ==
Al-Shanqeeti started his career at Al-Hilal. On 1 January 2023, Al-Shanqeeti joined Al-Ahli. On 23 August 2024, Al-Shanqeeti joined Pro League side Al-Shabab on loan.

On 16 September 2025, Al-Shanqeeti joined Neom.
