= Fran Sabina =

Spanish footballer

Personal information
- Full name: Francisco Miguel Sabina Rodríguez
- Date of birth: 22 September 2003 (age 23)
- Place of birth: Santa Cruz de La Palma, Spain
- Height: 1.80 m (5 ft 11 in)
- Position: Forward

Team information
- Current team: Alcorcón (on loan from Tenerife)

Youth career
- Atlético Tacoronte
- Sporting Tenerife
- Tenerife

Senior career*
Years	Team	Apps	(Gls)
2022–2024	Tenerife C	50	(46)
2023–2026	Tenerife B	42	(14)
2024–	Tenerife	11	(0)
2026–	→ Alcorcón (loan)	0	(0)
- * Club domestic league appearances and goals as of 9 May 2026

Francisco Miguel "Fran" Sabina Rodríguez (born 22 September 2003) is a Spanish footballer who plays as a forward for AD Alcorcón, on loan from CD Tenerife.

== Career ==
Born in Santa Cruz de La Palma, Canary Islands, Sabina represented Atlético Tacoronte, SC Tenerife and CD Tenerife as a youth, and made his senior debut with the latter's C-team in the Interinsular Preferente de Tenerife in 2022. In August 2023, he spent the pre-season with the main squad, and renewed his contract until 2026.

Sabina started to feature with the reserves during the 2023–24 season, helping the side to achieve promotion to Segunda Federación. He made his first team debut on 19 October 2024, coming on as a second-half substitute for Enric Gallego in a 4–0 Segunda División away loss to Granada CF.

Sabina began the 2025–26 campaign as a first team member in Primera Federación, but despite losing space after the arrival of Gastón Valles, he still renewed his contract until 2028 on 2 March 2026. On 13 August, after returning to division two at first attempt, he was loaned to third tier side AD Alcorcón for one year.

== Personal life ==
Sabina's father, also nicknamed Fran, was also a footballer and a forward. He never featured in any higher than Segunda División B, notably representing UD Vecindario.
