= Leandrinho (footballer, born 2005) =

Brazilian footballer

Personal information
- Full name: Leandro Viana da Silva Gama
- Date of birth: 17 March 2005 (age 21)
- Place of birth: Rio de Janeiro, Brazil
- Height: 1.70 m (5 ft 7 in)
- Position: Left-back

Team information
- Current team: Sharjah
- Number: 12

Youth career
- 2012–2024: Vasco da Gama

Senior career*
Years	Team	Apps	(Gls)
2024–2026	Vasco da Gama	22	(2)
2025	→ Al-Shabab (loan)	10	(0)
2026–	Sharjah	0	(0)

International career^{‡}
2025–	Brazil U20	6	(0)
Medal record
Men's football
Representing Brazil
South American U-20 Championship
Winner	2025 Venezuela
- * Club domestic league appearances and goals as of 13 December 2025 ‡ National team caps and goals as of 16:41, 17 February 2025 (UTC)

Leandro Viana da Silva Gama (born 17 March 2005), commonly known as Leandrinho, is a Brazilian professional footballer who plays as a left-back for Emirati club Sharjah.

== Career ==
Born in Rio de Janeiro, Leandrinho joined Vasco da Gama's youth sides in 2012, aged seven. On 6 September 2021, he signed his first professional contract until June 2025.

Leandrinho made his first team debut on 18 January 2024, starting and scoring the second in a 2–0 Campeonato Carioca home win over Boavista. Six days later, he renewed his link until January 2027.

Leandrinho made his Série A debut on 22 June 2024, coming on as a second-half substitute for Lucas Piton and scoring his team's third in a 4–1 home routing of São Paulo.

On 29 January 2025, Leandrinho joined Saudi Pro League club Al-Shabab on a six-month loan.

== Career statistics ==
As of 17 February 2025

Appearances and goals by club, season and competition
Club	Season	League			State League		National Cup		Continental		Other		Total	
Club	Season	Division	Apps	Goals	Apps	Goals	Apps	Goals	Apps	Goals	Apps	Goals	Apps	Goals
Vasco da Gama	2024	Série A	18	1	2	1	3	0	—		—		23	2
Career total			18	1	2	1	3	0	0	0	0	0	23	2

== Honours ==
Brazil U20

- South American Youth Football Championship: 2025
