= 2026–27 Al-Ittihad Club season =

Al-Ittihad Club
2026–27 season
- Chairman: Fahd bin Hamza Sindi
- Stadium: King Abdullah Sports City
- Saudi Pro League: Pre-season
- King's Cup: Round of 16
- AFC Champions League Elite: League stage
Home colours	Away colours

The 2026–27 season is the 100th season in the history of Al-Ittihad Club, as they compete in the Saudi Pro League, the King's Cup, and the AFC Champions League Elite.

== Transfers ==
=== In ===
Pos.	Player	Transferred from	Fee	Date	Source
FW	(Saudi Arabia) Marwan Al-Sahafi	(Belgium) Royal Antwerp	Loan return	30 June 2026	
DF	(Saudi Arabia) Fawaz Al-Sqoor	(Saudi Arabia) Al Shabab	Loan return	30 June 2026	
MF	(Argentina) Mateo Borrell	(Saudi Arabia) Al-Okhdood	Loan return	30 June 2026	
FW	(Colombia) Ricardo Caraballo	(Saudi Arabia) Al-Anwar	Loan return	30 June 2026	
DF	(Saudi Arabia) Muath Faqeehi	(Saudi Arabia) Al-Okhdood	Loan return	30 June 2026	
MF	(Saudi Arabia) Abdulelah Hawsawi	(Saudi Arabia) Al Taawoun	Loan return	30 June 2026	
MF	(Venezuela) Bryant Ortega	(United Arab Emirates) Khor Fakkan	Loan return	30 June 2026	
DF	(Argentina) Isaías Rodríguez	(Saudi Arabia) Al Batin	Loan return	30 June 2026	
DF	(Cameroon) Stephane Keller	(Cyprus) AEL Limassol	Loan made permanent	1 July 2026	
DF	(Serbia) Jan-Carlo Simić	(Belgium) Anderlecht	Loan made permanent (Note: €15 million)	22 July 2026	

=== Out ===
Pos.	Player	Transferred to	Fee	Date	Source
FW	(Colombia) Ricardo Caraballo	(Bosnia and Herzegovina) FK Sarajevo	Undisclosed	1 July 2026	

== Pre-season and friendlies ==
Al-Ittihad Club announced on 4 June that pre-season training will launch in Jeddah on 7 July, before the squad travels to Marbella, Spain, for an overseas camp from 14 to 31 July.

21 July 2026 Friendly	Al-Ittihad (Saudi Arabia)	3–2	(South Africa) Orlando Pirates	Spain
19:00	En-Nesyri 10'; Diaby 45+2'; Ilenikhena 85'		Mbatha 27'; Mbuthuma 90+3'

25 July 2026 Friendly	Las Palmas (Spain)	1–2	(Saudi Arabia) Al-Ittihad	Spain
19:00	Medina 78'		Diaby 15'; Fernandes 50'

30 July 2026 Friendly	Mallorca (Spain)	4–2	(Saudi Arabia) Al-Ittihad	Spain
10:00

30 July 2026 Friendly	Málaga (Spain)	2–2	(Saudi Arabia) Al-Ittihad	Spain
20:00

== Competitions ==
=== Overall record ===
Competition	First match	Last match	Starting round	Record							
Competition	First match	Last match	Starting round	Pld	W	D	L	GF	GA	GD	Win %
Saudi Pro League	14 August 2026		Matchday 1	2	1	1	0	2	1	+1	50.00
King's Cup	18 August 2026			1	1	0	0	3	0	+3	100.00
AFC Champions League Elite	11 August 2026		Preliminary round	1	1	0	0	4	1	+3	100.00
Total				4	3	1	0	9	2	+7	75.00

Source: Competitions

=== Pro League ===
==== League Table ====
Pos	Team	Pld	W	D	L	GF	GA	GD	Pts	Qualification
2	Al-Qadsiah	12	9	1	2	32	12	+20	28	AFC Champions League Elite League Stage
3	Al-Nassr	11	9	1	1	28	11	+17	28	AFC Champions League Elite League Stage
4	Al-Ittihad	11	7	3	1	21	11	+10	24	AFC Champions League Elite Preliminary Stage
5	Neom	12	7	1	4	18	10	+8	22	AFC Champions League Elite Preliminary Stage
6	Al-Ahli	11	7	0	4	28	19	+9	21	AFC Champions League Two Group Stage

Updated to match(es) played on 31 October 2026. Source: Saudi Pro League

==== Matches ====
15 August 2026 1	Al-Ittihad	1–1	Al-Kholood	Jeddah
21:00	En-Nesyri 43'; Pereira (red card); Shanqeeti (yellow card) 66'	Report	Da Costa (yellow card) 21'; Domingues 52'	Stadium: King Abdullah Sports City Stadium; Attendance: 18,053; Referee: Majed Mohammad Al-Shamrani

21 August 2026 2	Al-Qadsiah	0–1	Al-Ittihad	Dammam
21:00	Ilenikhena 45+1'; Lopy (yellow card) 40' (red card)	Report	Al-Shamat (yellow card) 45+1'	Stadium: Prince Mohammad Bin Fahd Stadium; Attendance: 10,709; Referee: Wilton Pereira Sampaio

24 August 2026 3	Al-Ittihad	3–2	Al-Hazem	Jeddah
21:00	Bergwijn 34', 41', 81'; Al-Sahafi (yellow card) 45+2'; Kadesh (yellow card) 50'; Abdi (yellow card) 53'	Report	Al-Dhuwayhi 18'; Bendebka 59'; Bah (yellow card) 29'; Hamida (yellow card) 40'; Al-Shamrani (yellow card) 74'	Stadium: Prince Abdullah Al-Faisal Sports City Stadium; Attendance: 8,987; Referee: Abdullah Al-Harbi

29 August 2026 4	Al-Fateh	0-0	Al-Ittihad	Mubarraz
21:00	Saadane (yellow card) 42'	Report	Kadesh (yellow card) 45+3'	Stadium: Al-Fateh Stadium; Attendance: 9,256; Referee: Faris Al Balawi

5 September 2026 5	Al-Ittihad	2–1	Al-Nassr	Jeddah
21:00	Ilenikhena 4', 22'; En-Nesyri (yellow card) 90+2'	Report	Gabriel 36'; Al-Amri (yellow card) 90+1'	Stadium: King Abdullah Sports City Stadium; Attendance: 47,661; Referee: Abdullah Al-Harbi

8 September 2026 6	Al-Ittihad	2–1	Al-Fayha	Jeddah
21:00	Ilenikhena 43'; Simić (yellow card) 59'; Youssef En-Nesyri 68'(p)	Report	Jason Remeseiro 45+4'; Mohammad Al-Balawi (yellow card) 66'	Stadium: King Abdullah Sports City Stadium; Attendance: 17,338; Referee: Faris Al Balawi

11 September 2026 7	Al-Faisaly	1–3	Al-Ittihad	Jeddah
19:00	Bongonda 87'	Report	Bergwijn 28'; Youssef En-Nesyri 43', 59'	Stadium: Majmaah Sports City Stadium; Attendance: 17,338; Referee: Majed Mohammad Al-Shamrani

10 October 2026 8	Al-Hilal	3-2	Al-Ittihad	Riyadh
21:00				Stadium: Kingdom Arena

16 October 2026 9	Al-Ittihad	v	Al-Shabab	Jeddah
21:00				Stadium: King Abdullah Sports City Stadium

=== King's Cup ===
18 August 2026 Round of 32	Al-Najma	0–3	Al-Ittihad	Buraydah
7:15 (UTC+3)		Report	Ilenikhena 16', 38'; Pereira 51'	Stadium: King Abdullah Sports City Stadium Buraydah; Referee: Mohammad Al-Ismail

=== AFC Champions League Elite ===
==== Preliminary round ====
11 August 2026 Preliminary round	Al Jazira (United Arab Emirates)	1−4	(Saudi Arabia) Al-Ittihad	Abu Dhabi, United Arab Emirates
20:00 UTC+4	Banza 80'	Report	Bergwijn 12', 38'; Aouar 54'; Al-Sahafi 69'	Stadium: Mohammed bin Zayed Stadium; Attendance: 5,900; Referee: Qasim Al-Hatmi (Oman)

==== League Stage ====
Matchday 1

14 September 2026
19:00 UTC+3

Al-Shamal (Qatar)	1-1	(Saudi Arabia) Al-Ittihad
Bounedjah 63'	Report	Wijnaldum 90+3'

Al Bayt Stadium, Al Khor
Attendance: 4,069
Referee: Ahmad Al Ali

Matchday 2

13 October 2026
21:15 UTC+3

Al-Ittihad (Saudi Arabia)	v	(United Arab Emirates) Shabab Al Ahli

King Abdullah Sports City Stadium, Jeddah

Matchday 3

26 October 2026
18:45 UTC+5

Neftchi (Uzbekistan)	v	(Saudi Arabia) Al-Ittihad

Istiqlol Stadium, Fergana

Matchday 4

2 November 2026
21:15 UTC+3

Al-Ittihad (Saudi Arabia)	v	(United Arab Emirates) Al Ain

King Abdullah Sports City Stadium, Jeddah

Matchday 5

23 November 2026
21:15 UTC+3

Al-Ittihad (Saudi Arabia)	v	(Uzbekistan) Pakhtakor

King Abdullah Sports City Stadium, Jeddah

Matchday 6

7 December 2026
20:00 UTC+4

Al Wasl (United Arab Emirates)	v	(Saudi Arabia) Al-Ittihad

Zabeel Stadium, Dubai

Matchday 7

8 February 2027
21:15 UTC+3

Al-Ittihad (Saudi Arabia)	v	(Qatar) Al-Gharafa

King Abdullah Sports City Stadium, Jeddah

Matchday 8

15 February 2027
21:15 UTC+3

Al Sadd (Qatar)	v	(Saudi Arabia) Al-Ittihad

Jassim bin Hamad Stadium, Al Rayyan
