= 2026–27 Al-Nassr FC season =

Al-Nassr
2026–27 season
- President: Abdullah Al-Majed
- Head coach: Ange Postecoglou
- Stadium: Al-Awwal Park
- Pro League: 3rd
- King's Cup: Round of 16
- Super Cup: Semi-finals
- Champions League Elite: League stage
- Top goalscorer: League: Cristiano Ronaldo (8); All: Cristiano Ronaldo (9)
Home colours	Away colours
- All statistics correct as of 20 October 2026.

The 2026–27 season is Al-Nassr's 51st consecutive season in the top flight of Saudi football and 71st year in existence as a football club. It includes participation in the Pro League, the King’s Cup, the Super Cup, and the AFC Champions League Elite. The competitive fixtures began with the opening of the league on 13 August.

== Transfers ==
=== In ===
Pos.	Player	Transferred from	Fee	Date	Source
FW	(Saudi Arabia) Haroune Camara	(Saudi Arabia) Al Shabab	Loan return	30 June 2026	
FW	(Colombia) Jhon Durán	(Russia) Zenit Saint Petersburg	Loan return	30 June 2026	
MF	(Brazil) Wesley	(Spain) Real Sociedad	Loan return	30 June 2026	

=== Out ===
Pos.	Player	Transferred to	Fee	Date	Source
MF	(Croatia) Marcelo Brozović		End of contract	1 July 2026	

== Pre-season and friendlies ==
On 18 June, it published its pre-season program consisting of 18 days of preparation in both Riyadh and Abha, before continuing in Portugal.

22 July 2026 Friendly	Benfica B (Portugal)	2–1	(Saudi Arabia) Al-Nassr	Lisbon, Portugal
19:00	T. Rodrigues, G. Gaspar		A. Al-Jaber

28 July 2026 Friendly	Mérida (Spain)	0–2	(Saudi Arabia) Al-Nassr	Lisbon, Portugal
19:00			M. Marran, H. Camara

1 August 2026 Friendly	Estrela da Amadora (Portugal)	4–2	(Saudi Arabia) Al-Nassr
19:00	L. Antonetti, A. Marcus, S. Van Hooijdonk, Beni Souza		A. Al-Hamdan, Hayder Abdulkareem

4 August 2026 Friendly	Al-Nassr (Saudi Arabia)	0–2	(Spain) Almeria	Oeiras, Portugal
19:00			D. Chirino, A. Embarba

== Competitions ==
=== Overall record ===
Competition	First match	Last match	Starting round	Record							
Competition	First match	Last match	Starting round	Pld	W	D	L	GF	GA	GD	Win %
Pro League	15 August 2026	28 May 2027	Matchday 1	11	9	1	1	28	11	+17	81.82
King's Cup	18 August 2026		Round of 32	1	1	0	0	4	1	+3	100.00
Super Cup	30 November–1 December 2026		Semi-finals	0	0	0	0	0	0	+0	—
Champions League Elite	15 September 2026		League stage	3	2	0	1	9	7	+2	66.67
Total				15	12	1	2	41	19	+22	80.00

Last updated: 2 November 2026
Source: Competitions

=== Pro League ===
==== League table ====
Pos	Team	Pld	W	D	L	GF	GA	GD	Pts	Qualification
1	Al-Hilal	11	10	0	1	32	9	+23	30	AFC Champions League Elite League Stage
2	Al-Qadsiah	12	9	1	2	32	12	+20	28	AFC Champions League Elite League Stage
3	Al-Nassr	11	9	1	1	28	11	+17	28	AFC Champions League Elite League Stage
4	Al-Ittihad	11	7	3	1	21	11	+10	24	AFC Champions League Elite Preliminary Stage
5	Neom	12	7	1	4	18	10	+8	22	AFC Champions League Elite Preliminary Stage

Updated to match(es) played on 31 October 2026. Source: Saudi Pro League

==== Results summary ====
Overall								Home						Away					
Pld	W	D	L	GF	GA	GD	Pts	W	D	L	GF	GA	GD	W	D	L	GF	GA	GD
10	8	1	1	23	8	+15	25	5	0	0	11	2	+9	3	1	1	12	6	+6

Last updated: 23 October 2026.
Source: Saudi Pro League

==== Results by round ====
Round	1	2	3	4	5	6	7	8	10	11	12	9	13	14	15	16	17	18	19	20	21	22	23	24	25	26	27	28	29	30	31	32	33
Ground	H	A	A	H	A	H	A	H	H	A	H	A	A	H	H	A	H	A															
Result	W	W	W	W	L	W	D	W	W	W	W	L																					
Position	1	1	1	2	2	2	3	3	3	2	3	3																					

Updated to match(es) played on 22 October 2026. Source: Saudi Pro League
A = Away; H = Home; W = Win; D = Draw; L = Loss

==== Matches ====
All times are local, SAST (UTC+03:00).

Win Draw Loss Postponed

15 August 2026 1	Al-Nassr	3–0	Al-Fateh	Riyadh
21:00	Ângelo 37'; Félix 40'; Costa 73'			Stadium: Al-Awwal Park

21 August 2026 2	Al-Riyadh	0–4	Al-Nassr	Riyadh
19:00			Al-Amri 18'; Ângelo 45+1'; Félix 58'; Ronaldo 83'	Stadium: Prince Turki bin Abdulaziz Stadium

25 August 2026 3	Al-Ettifaq	2–3	Al-Nassr	Dammam
21:00	Duda 31'; Medrán 45+4'		Mané 74', 90'; Al-Amri 77'	Stadium: Al-Ettifaq Club Stadium

28 August 2026 4	Al-Nassr	2–1	Al Taawoun	Riyadh
21:00	Costa 45+5'; Ronaldo 50'		Al-Hurayji 11'	Stadium: Al-Awwal Park; Referee: Abdullah Dhafer Al-Shehri

5 September 2026 5	Al-Ittihad	2–1	Al-Nassr	Jeddah
21:00	Ilenikhena 4', 22'		Ângelo 36'	Stadium: King Abdullah Sports City Stadium

9 September 2026 6	Al-Nassr	2–1	Abha	Riyadh
21:00	Ronaldo 22'; Al-Hamdan 58'		Fekir 75'	Stadium: Al-Awwal Park

12 September 2026 7	Al-Khaleej	1–1	Al-Nassr	Dammam
	Mascarell 45+1'		Al-Hamdan 72'	Stadium: Prince Mohamed bin Fahd Stadium

9 October 2026 8	Al-Nassr	3–0	Al-Diriyah	Riyadh
	Ronaldo 23'; Costa 35'; Coman 77'			Stadium: Al-Awwal Park

20 October 2026 10	Al-Nassr	1–0	Neom	Riyadh
	Félix 61'			Stadium: Al-Awwal Park

23 October 2026 11	Al Faisaly	1–3	Al-Nassr	Majmaah
	Bongonda 66'		Al-Hamdan 4'; Girotto 49' (o.g.); Ângelo 79'	Stadium: Majmaah Sports City Stadium

29 October 2026 12	Al-Nassr	5–3	Al-Kholood	Riyadh
	Ângelo 24'; Mané 38'; Ronaldo 66', 72', 81'		Domingues 16', 90+4' (pen.); Essomba 45+2'	Stadium: Al-Awwal Park

20 November 2026 9	Al-Ahli	3–1	Al-Nassr	Jeddah
	Galeno 45+1'; Toney 71' (pen.); Ibañez 75'		Ronaldo 14'	Stadium: King Abdullah Sports City Stadium

28 November 2026 13	Al-Hazem	v	Al-Nassr	Ar Rass
				Stadium: Al-Hazem Club Stadium

4 December 2026 14	Al-Nassr	v	Al Qadsiah	Riyadh
				Stadium: Al-Awwal Park

12 December 2026 15	Al-Nassr	v	Al-Shabab	Riyadh
				Stadium: Al-Awwal Park

16 December 2026 16	Al-Fayha	v	Al-Nassr	Majmaah
				Stadium: Majmaah Sports City Stadium

1 January 2027 17	Al-Nassr	v	Al-Hilal	Riyadh
				Stadium: Al-Awwal Park

7 January 2027 18	Al-Fateh	v	Al-Nassr	Hofuf
				Stadium: Prince Abdullah bin Jalawi Stadium

=== King's Cup ===
18 August 2026 Round of 32	Al-Diriyah	1–4	Al-Nassr	Riyadh
21:00	Óscar 2'		Simakan 11'; Félix 36', 68'; Al-Hamdan 37'	Stadium: Prince Turki bin Abdulaziz Stadium

11 January 2027 Round of 16	Al-Nassr	v	Al-Kholood	Riyadh
				Stadium: Al-Awwal Park

=== Super Cup ===
20 December 2026 Semi-finals	Al-Nassr	v	Al-Kholood	Kuwait City
				Stadium: Jaber Al-Ahmad International Stadium

=== AFC Champions League Elite ===
==== League stage ====
Pos	Team	Pld	W	D	L	GF	GA	GD	Pts	Qualification
5	(Saudi Arabia) Al-Qadsiah	4	2	2	0	9	3	+6	8	Advance to round of 16
6	(Saudi Arabia) Al-Ahli	4	2	2	0	6	3	+3	8	Advance to round of 16
7	(Saudi Arabia) Al-Nassr	3	2	0	1	9	7	+2	6	Advance to round of 16
8	(Qatar) Al-Shamal	4	1	2	1	4	3	+1	5	Advance to round of 16
9	(Uzbekistan) Neftchi	4	1	1	2	5	7	−2	4	

Updated to match(es) played on 3 November 2026. Source: AFC
Rules for classification: 1) points; 2) goal difference; 3) number of goals scored; 4) number of matches won; 5) penalty shoot-out if only two teams remain tied and played each other on the final matchday 6) fair play ranking; 7) drawing of lots

15 September 2026 1	Al Ain (United Arab Emirates)	4–0	(Saudi Arabia) Al-Nassr	Al Ain, United Arab Emirates
	H.Rahimi 25', 63'; S.Rahimi 72'; Giakoumakis 85'	Report		Stadium: Hazza bin Zayed Stadium; Referee: Ilgiz Tantashev (Uzbekistan)

12 October 2026 2	Al-Nassr (Saudi Arabia)	3–1	(Uzbekistan) Neftchi	Riyadh, Saudi Arabia
	Ângelo 33'; Ronaldo 42'; Gofurov 78' (o.g.)		Odilov 51'	Stadium: Al-Awwal Park; Attendance: 7,108; Referee: Ma Ning (China)

2 November 2026 4	Pakhtakor (Uzbekistan)	2–6	(Saudi Arabia) Al-Nassr	Tashkent, Uzbekistan
	Flamarion 36'; Khamdanov 75'		Al-Hamdan 15'; Félix 17', 32'; Al-Amri 53'; Ghareeb 62'; Ângelo 79'	Stadium: Pakhtakor Central Stadium; Attendance: 28,153; Referee: Alex King (Australia)

24 November 2026 5	Al-Nassr (Saudi Arabia)	v	(Qatar) Al Sadd	Riyadh, Saudi Arabia
				Stadium: Al-Awwal Park

8 December 2026 6	Al-Gharafa (Qatar)	v	(Saudi Arabia) Al-Nassr	Al Gharrafa, Qatar
				Stadium: Thani bin Jassim Stadium

27 December 2026 3	Al-Nassr (Saudi Arabia)	v	(United Arab Emirates) Al Wasl	Riyadh, Saudi Arabia
				Stadium: Al-Awwal Park

8 February 2027 7	Al-Nassr (Saudi Arabia)	v	(Qatar) Al-Shamal	Riyadh, Saudi Arabia
				Stadium: Al-Awwal Park

15 February 2027 8	Shabab Al Ahli (United Arab Emirates)	v	(Saudi Arabia) Al-Nassr	Dubai, United Arab Emirates
				Stadium: Rashid Stadium
