= 2026–27 Al-Ahli Saudi FC season =

Al-Ahli
2026–27 season
- Manager: Marino Pušić
- Stadium: King Abdullah Sports City
- Pro League: 6th
- King's Cup: Round of 16
- Super Cup: Semi-finals
- ACL Elite: League stage
- FIFA Intercontinental Cup: African–Asian–Pacific Cup
- Top goalscorer: League: Ivan Toney (12); All: Ivan Toney (12)
Home colours	Away colours	Third colours

The 2026–27 season is Al-Ahli's 90th year in existence and 50th season in the Pro League. The club is participating in the Pro League, the King's Cup, the AFC Champions League Elite, the FIFA Intercontinental Cup, and the Super Cup.

== Transfers ==
=== In ===
Pos.	Player	Transferred from	Fee	Date	Source
DF	(The Gambia) Abubacarr Sedi Kinteh	(Norway) Tromsø	€7 million	18 July 2026	
MF	(Portugal) Francisco Trincão	(Portugal) Sporting CP	€85 million	18 July 2026	
MF	(Armenia) Eduard Spertsyan	(Russia) Krasnodar	€21.9 million	22 July 2026	

=== Out ===
Pos.	Player	Transferred to	Fee	Date	Source
MF	(Algeria) Riyad Mahrez		Contract terminated	4 July 2026	

== Pre-season ==
Al-Ahli held two overseas training camps, in Austria from 3–16 July, before relocating to Portugal until the 28th of the same month.

11 July 2026 Friendly	Pinzgau Saalfelden (Austria)	0–8	(Saudi Arabia) Al-Ahli	Austria
			Spertsyan 29'; Al-Shamat 40'; Mathias 45+2'; Al-Mutairi 51'; Mathias 58'; Lobato 62'; Abu Bakr 68'; Abu Bakr 84'

15 July 2026 Friendly	Holstein Kiel (Germany)	4–1	(Saudi Arabia) Al-Ahli	Austria
17:00 UTC+2	Davidsen 42'; Kvilitaia 45+5'; Harres 50'; Zec 61'		Mathias 68'

19 July 2026 Friendly	Rio Ave (Portugal)	2–2	(Saudi Arabia) Al-Ahli	Portugal
18:00 UTC+2	Lobato 75'; Ntoi 89'		Al-Buraikan 3'; Gonçalves 6'

24 July 2026 Friendly	Vitória de Guimarães (Portugal)	3–1	(Saudi Arabia) Al-Ahli	Portugal
10:30 UTC+1	9', 13', 25'		Gonçalves 47'

== Competitions ==
=== Overall record ===
Competition	First match	Last match	Starting round	Final position	Record							
Competition	First match	Last match	Starting round	Final position	Pld	W	D	L	GF	GA	GD	Win %
Saudi Pro League	13 August 2026	28 May 2027	Matchday 1		7	4	0	3	16	10	+6	57.14
King's Cup	17 August 2026		Round of 32		1	1	0	0	2	1	+1	100.00
Saudi Super Cup	30 November–1 December 2026		Semi-finals		0	0	0	0	0	0	+0	—
AFC Champions League Elite	14 September 2026		League stage		1	0	1	0	1	1	+0	0.00
FIFA Intercontinental Cup	26 August 2026	19 September 2026	First round	Second round	2	1	0	1	2	2	+0	50.00
Total					11	6	1	4	21	14	+7	54.55

Last updated: 19 September 2026
Source: Soccerway

=== Pro League ===
==== League table ====
Pos	Team	Pld	W	D	L	GF	GA	GD	Pts	Qualification
3	Al-Hilal	10	9	0	1	30	9	+21	27	AFC Champions League Elite League Stage
4	Al-Ittihad	10	7	2	1	20	10	+10	23	AFC Champions League Elite Preliminary Stage
5	Al-Ahli	10	7	0	3	27	13	+14	21	AFC Champions League Elite Preliminary Stage
6	Neom	11	6	1	4	16	9	+7	19	AFC Champions League Two Group Stage
7	Al-Ettifaq	11	5	3	3	17	16	+1	18	Qualification for the GFF Gulf Club Champions League group stage

Updated to match(es) played on 29 October 2026. Source: Saudi Pro League

==== Results summary ====
Overall								Home						Away					
Pld	W	D	L	GF	GA	GD	Pts	W	D	L	GF	GA	GD	W	D	L	GF	GA	GD
7	4	0	3	16	10	+6	12	3	0	0	12	1	+11	1	0	3	4	9	−5

Last updated: 11 September 2026.
Source: Saudi Pro League

==== Results by round ====
Round	1	2	3	4	5	6	7	8	9	11	12	13	14	15	16	17	18	19	20	21	22	23	10	24	25	26	27	28	29	30	31	32	33	34
Ground	A	H	A	A	H	A	H	A	H	A	H	A	H	H	A	H	A	H	A	H	H	A	H	A	H	A	H	A	H	A	A	H	A	H
Result	W	W																																
Position	7	3																																

Updated to match(es) played on 22 August 2026. Source:
A = Away; H = Home; W = Win; D = Draw; L = Loss

==== Matches ====
All times are local, AST (UTC+3).

Win Draw Loss Postponed

13 August 2026 1	Al-Diriyah	0–1	Al-Ahli	Riyadh
21:00			Spertsyan 25'	Stadium: Prince Faisal bin Fahd Sports City Stadium

22 August 2026 2	Al-Ahli	4–0	Abha	Jeddah
21:00	Toney 5', 13' (pen.), 57'; Trincão 51'			Stadium: Alinma Stadium

29 August 2026 3	Al-Kholood	3–1	Al-Ahli	Ar Rass
18:05	Kortajarena 32'; Domingues 85'; Sawaan 90+2'		Toney 66'	Stadium: Al-Hazem Club Stadium

1 September 2026 4	Al-Hilal	3–0	Al-Ahli	Riyadh
21:00	Milinković-Savić 8'; Summerville 22'; Watkins 85'		Demiral (yellow card) 45+4' (yellow-red card) 45+5'	Stadium: Kingdom Arena

4 September 2026 5	Al-Ahli	5–0	Al-Riyadh	Jeddah
20:00	Toney 16' (pen.), 61' (pen.); Spertsyan 43'; Trincão 45+2'; Masoud 87'			Stadium: Prince Abdullah Al-Faisal Sports City Stadium

8 September 2026 6	Al-Qadsiah	3–2	Al-Ahli	Dammam
21:00	Reijnders 14', 45+3'; Abu Al-Shamat 45+1'		Ivan Toney 63', 82'	Stadium: Prince Mohamed bin Fahd Stadium

9 September 2026 7	Al-Ahli	3–1	Al-Hazem	Jeddah
21:00	Francisco Trincão 21'; Ivan Toney 32' (pen.), 45'	Report	Al-Nakhli 2'	Stadium: Prince Abdullah Al Faisal Stadium; Attendance: 6,158; Referee: Khalid Saleh Al Turais

16 September 2026 8	Al-Fateh	0–4	Al-Ahli	Al-Hasa
17:55		Report	Trincão 31', 50'; Toney 60'; Al-Johani 89'	Stadium: Maydan Tamweel Aloula; Attendance: 8,690; Referee: Abdullah bin Fahad bin Abdulaziz Al-Owaidan

19 October 2026 9	Al-Fayha	2–3	Al-Ahli	Al Majma'ah
19:55	Moura 45'; Jason 65'	Report	Bondarenko 45+3', 70'; Firas 59'	Stadium: Majmaah Sports City Stadium

23 October 2026 10	Al-Ahli	4–1	Al-Khaleej	Jeddah
18:00	Toney 10', 90+6' (pen.); Bondarenko 57'; Trincão 61'	Report	Benegas (red card) 69'; Al-Khaibari 87'	Stadium: Prince Abdullah Al-Faisal Sports City Stadium; Attendance: 4,736

8 October 2026 10	Al-Ahli	v	Al-Nassr	Jeddah
TBC				Stadium: TBC

28 October 2026 12	Al-Shabab	v	Al-Ahli	Riyadh
TBC				Stadium: TBC

4 November 2026 13	Al-Ahli	v	Al-Taawoun	Jeddah
TBC				Stadium: TBC

19 November 2026 14	Al-Ahli	v	Al-Faisaly	Jeddah
TBC				Stadium: TBC

25 November 2026 15	Al-Ittihad	v	Al-Ahli	Jeddah
TBC				Stadium: TBC

2 December 2026 16	Al-Ahli	v	Al-Ettifaq	Jeddah
TBC				Stadium: TBC

9 December 2026 17	Neom	v	Al-Ahli	Tabuk
TBC				Stadium: King Khalid Sport City Stadium

=== King's Cup ===
17 August 2026 Round of 32	Al-Anwar	1–2	Al-Ahli	Hotat Bani Tamim
19:00 SAST (UTC+3)	Bensayah 90+2'	Report	Spertsyan 61'; Galeno 89'	Stadium: Al-Anwar Club Stadium; Attendance: 3,009; Referee: Abdullah Al-Owaidan

=== AFC Champions League Elite ===
==== League stage ====
Pos	Team	Pld	W	D	L	GF	GA	GD	Pts	Qualification
1	(United Arab Emirates) Al Ain	3	3	0	0	10	2	+8	9	Advance to round of 16
2	(United Arab Emirates) Shabab Al Ahli	3	3	0	0	5	1	+4	9	Advance to round of 16
3	(Saudi Arabia) Al-Ahli	3	2	1	0	6	3	+3	7	Advance to round of 16
4	(Iran) Esteghlal	3	2	0	1	5	3	+2	6	Advance to round of 16
5	(Saudi Arabia) Al-Hilal	3	2	0	1	5	4	+1	6	Advance to round of 16

Updated to match(es) played on 27 October 2026. Source: AFC
Rules for classification: 1) points; 2) goal difference; 3) number of goals scored; 4) number of matches won; 5) penalty shoot-out if only two teams remain tied and played each other on the final matchday 6) fair play ranking; 7) drawing of lots

==== Matches ====
14 September 2026	Al-Ahli (Saudi Arabia)	1–1	(Uzbekistan) Pakhtakor	King Abdullah Sports City Stadium, Jeddah
21:15 UTC+3	Al-Buraikan 90+3'	Report	Flamarion 86'	Attendance: 15,145; Referee: Abdullah Jamali (Kuwait)

12 October 2026	Al Wasl (United Arab Emirates)	1–3	(Saudi Arabia) Al-Ahli	Zabeel Stadium, Dubai
20:00 UTC+4	Malheiro 45+3'	Report	Ibañez 20'; Trincão 58'; Al-Buraikan 90+1'	Attendance: 6,585; Referee: Abdulrahman Al-Jassim (Qatar)

26 October 2026	Al-Ahli (Saudi Arabia)	2–1	(Qatar) Al-Gharafa	King Abdullah Sports City Stadium, Jeddah
19:00 UTC+3	Toney 4'; Gonçalves 86'	Report	F. Coman 53'	Attendance: 7,998; Referee: Ma Ning (China)

2 November 2026	Al Sadd (Qatar)	v	(Saudi Arabia) Al-Ahli	Jassim bin Hamad Stadium, Al Rayyan
19:00 UTC+3

23 November 2026	Al-Shamal (Qatar)	v	(Saudi Arabia) Al-Ahli	Al Bayt Stadium, Al Khor
19:00 UTC+3

8 December 2026	Al-Ahli (Saudi Arabia)	v	(United Arab Emirates) Shabab Al Ahli	Prince Abdullah Al-Faisal Sports City Stadium, Jeddah
21:15 UTC+3

9 February 2027	Neftchi (Uzbekistan)	v	(Saudi Arabia) Al-Ahli	Istiqlol Stadium, Fergana
18:45 UTC+5

15 February 2027	Al-Ahli (Saudi Arabia)	v	(United Arab Emirates) Al Ain	King Abdullah Sports City Stadium, Jeddah
21:15 UTC+3

=== FIFA Intercontinental Cup ===
26 August 2026 First round	Al-Ahli (Saudi Arabia)	1-0	(New Zealand) Auckland FC	Jeddah
21:00 AST (UTC+3)		Report		Stadium: Alinma Stadium; Referee: Amin Omar (Egypt)
