= 2026–27 Al Hilal SFC season =

Al-Hilal
2026–27 season
- President: Nawaf bin Saad
- Head coach: Simone Inzaghi
- Stadium: Kingdom Arena
- Pro League: 3rd
- King's Cup: Round of 16
- ACL Elite: League stage
Home colours	Away colours

The 2026–27 season is Al-Hilal's 51st consecutive season in the top flight of Saudi football and 69th year in existence as a football club. The club is participating in the Pro League, the King's Cup, and the AFC Champions League Elite.

Al-Hilal was banned from the Super Cup due to their withdrawal from the prior edition.

== Players ==
As of 3 September 2026

Note: Flags indicate national team as defined under FIFA eligibility rules; some limited exceptions apply. Players may hold more than one non-FIFA nationality.

No.	Pos.	Nation	Player
2	DF	KSA	Mohammed Mahzari
3	DF	SEN	Kalidou Koulibaly
4	DF	TUR	Yusuf Akçiçek
6	MF	KSA	Nasser Al-Dawsari
7	FW	BRA	Gabriel Martinelli
8	MF	POR	Rúben Neves
11	FW	ENG	Ollie Watkins
17	GK	KSA	Mohammed Al-Rubaie
18	MF	KSA	Murad Hawsawi
19	DF	FRA	Théo Hernandez
22	MF	SRB	Sergej Milinković-Savić
24	DF	KSA	Moteb Al-Harbi
27	MF	KSA	Sultan Mandash
28	MF	KSA	Mohamed Kanno (vice-captain)
29	FW	KSA	Salem Al-Dawsari (captain)
31	DF	KSA	Rayan Al-Ghamdi

No.	Pos.	Nation	Player
33	GK	KSA	Mohammed Al-Owais
35	GK	KSA	Rayan Al-Dossary
37	GK	MAR	Yassine Bounou
38	FW	NED	Crysencio Summerville
44	DF	KSA	Saad Al-Mutairi
55	DF	KSA	Mishal Al-Dawood
70	MF	FRA	Saïmon Bouabré
72	MF	KSA	Sabri Dahal
73	DF	KSA	Mohammed Al-Sarnoukh
75	FW	CIV	Mohamed Kader Meïté
77	FW	KSA	Nawaf Al-Habashi
78	DF	KSA	Ali Lajami
87	DF	KSA	Hassan Al-Tambakti
88	DF	KSA	Hamad Al-Yami
93	MF	KSA	Abdullah Al-Anazi

== Transfers ==
=== In ===
Pos.	Player	Transferred from	Fee	Date	Source
DF	(Saudi Arabia) Ali Al-Bulaihi	(Saudi Arabia) Al Shabab	Loan return	30 June 2026	
DF	(Portugal) João Cancelo	(Spain) Barcelona	Loan return	30 June 2026	
FW	(Saudi Arabia) Abdullah Radif	(Saudi Arabia) Al-Fayha	Loan return	30 June 2026	
MF	(Saudi Arabia) Sabri Dahal	(Saudi Arabia) Al-Fayha	Undisclosed	4 July 2026	
DF	(Saudi Arabia) Mohammed Al-Sarnoukh	(Saudi Arabia) Al-Fateh	Undisclosed	22 July 2026	
GK	(Saudi Arabia) Mohammed Al-Owais	(Saudi Arabia) Al-Ula	Free Transfer	22 July 2026	
MF	(Saudi Arabia) Abdullah Al-Anazi	(Saudi Arabia) Al-Fateh	Free Transfer	22 July 2026	
FW	(Saudi Arabia) Nawaf Al-Habashi	(Saudi Arabia) Al-Hazem	Free Transfer	22 July 2026	
MF	(Netherlands) Crysencio Summerville	(England) West Ham United	Undisclosed	24 July 2026	
DF	(Saudi Arabia) Mohammed Mahzari	(Saudi Arabia) Al-Taawoun	Undisclosed	27 July 2026	
FW	(England) Ollie Watkins	(England) Aston Villa	Undisclosed	30 August 2026	
FW	(Brazil) Gabriel Martinelli	(England) Arsenal	Undisclosed	3 September 2026	

=== Out ===
Exit date	Position	No.	Player	To club	Fee	Ref.
17 July 2026	FW	11	(Brazil) Marcos Leonardo	(Netherlands) Ajax	Undisclosed	
22 July 2026	FW	15	(Saudi Arabia) Mohammed al-Qahtani	(Saudi Arabia) Al-Qadsiah	Undisclosed	
08 August 2026	FW	20	(Saudi Arabia) Abdullah Radif	(Saudi Arabia) Al-Ahli	Free Transfer	
17 August 2026	GK	40	(Saudi Arabia) Ahmed Abu Rasen	(Belgium) Sint-Truiden	Free Transfer	
20 August 2026	DF	20	(Portugal) João Cancelo	(Spain) Barcelona	Free Transfer	
20 August 2026	DF	30	(Spain) Pablo Marí	(Qatar) Al-Shamal	Free Transfer	
21 August 2026	FW	77	(Brazil) Malcom	(United Arab Emirates) Al Jazira	Free Transfer	
26 August 2026	GK	25	(France) Mathieu Patouillet	(France) Brest	Free Transfer	
01 September 2026	DF	5	(Saudi Arabia) Ali Al-Bulaihi	(Saudi Arabia) Al-Shabab	Free Transfer	

=== Loans out ===
Start date	End date	Position	No.	Player	To club	Fee	Ref.
22 July 2026	End of season	FW	33	(Saudi Arabia) Abdulkarim Darisi	(Saudi Arabia) Abha	None	
11 August 2026	End of season	FW	33	(Saudi Arabia) Abdullah Al-Zaid	(Saudi Arabia) Al-Diriyah	None	
22 August 2026	End of season	FW	7	(Uruguay) Darwin Núñez	(Saudi Arabia) Al-Diriyah	None	

== Pre-season and friendlies ==
The players' preparations for the season will commence on 1 July upon their return to training, and on 15 July they will travel to an overseas training camp for twenty days.

19 July 2026 Friendly	Al Hilal (Saudi Arabia)	2–1	(Austria) Sturm Graz II	Stegersbach, Austria
16:30 UTC+2	Benzema 3'; Malcom 67'		Lazarre 40'

24 July 2026 Friendly	Al Hilal (Saudi Arabia)	2–0	(South Africa) Mamelodi Sundowns	Austria
18:00	Malcom 8', 63'

== Competitions ==
=== Overall record ===
Competition	First match	Last match	Starting round	Record							
Competition	First match	Last match	Starting round	Pld	W	D	L	GF	GA	GD	Win %
Saudi Pro League	13 August 2026		Matchday 1	10	9	0	1	30	9	+21	90.00
King's Cup	17 August 2026		Round of 32	1	1	0	0	2	0	+2	100.00
AFC Champions League Elite	14–15 September 2026		League stage	2	2	0	0	4	1	+3	100.00
Total				13	12	0	1	36	10	+26	92.31

Source: Competitions

=== Saudi Pro League ===
Pos	Team	Pld	W	D	L	GF	GA	GD	Pts	Qualification
1	Al-Hilal	11	10	0	1	32	9	+23	30	AFC Champions League Elite League Stage
2	Al-Qadsiah	12	9	1	2	32	12	+20	28	AFC Champions League Elite League Stage
3	Al-Nassr	11	9	1	1	28	11	+17	28	AFC Champions League Elite League Stage
4	Al-Ittihad	11	7	3	1	21	11	+10	24	AFC Champions League Elite Preliminary Stage
5	Neom	12	7	1	4	18	10	+8	22	AFC Champions League Elite Preliminary Stage

Updated to match(es) played on 31 October 2026. Source: Saudi Pro League

=== King's Cup ===
16–19 August 2026 Round of 32	Al Raed	v	Al Hilal

=== AFC Champions League Elite ===
==== League stage ====
Pos	Team	Pld	W	D	L	GF	GA	GD	Pts	Qualification
1	(United Arab Emirates) Al Ain	4	4	0	0	14	3	+11	12	Advance to round of 16
2	(Saudi Arabia) Al-Hilal	4	3	0	1	7	4	+3	9	Advance to round of 16
3	(Iran) Esteghlal	4	3	0	1	6	3	+3	9	Advance to round of 16
4	(United Arab Emirates) Shabab Al Ahli	4	3	0	1	5	3	+2	9	Advance to round of 16
5	(Saudi Arabia) Al-Qadsiah	4	2	2	0	9	3	+6	8	Advance to round of 16

Updated to match(es) played on 2 November 2026. Source: AFC
Rules for classification: 1) points; 2) goal difference; 3) number of goals scored; 4) number of matches won; 5) penalty shoot-out if only two teams remain tied and played each other on the final matchday 6) fair play ranking; 7) drawing of lots

15 September 2026 1	Al Hilal (Saudi Arabia)	2–1	(Qatar) Al-Gharafa	Riyadh, Saudi Arabia
21:15	Neves 45+3' (pen.); Milinković-Savić 73'		Hassan 90+2'	Stadium: Kingdom Arena; Attendance: 20,140; Referee: Omar Al-Ali (United Arab Emirates)

12 October 2026 2	Al Sadd (Qatar)	0-2	(Saudi Arabia) Al Hilal	Doha , Qatar
19:00			Watkins 40'; Neves 65' (pen.)	Stadium: Jassim Bin Hamad Stadium; Attendance: 11,223; Referee: Yusuke Araki (Japan)

27 October 2026 3	Al-Shamal (Qatar)	3-1	(Saudi Arabia) Al Hilal	Al khor, Qatar
21:15	Saïd 8'; Bounedjah 48'; Romdhane 54'		Al-Dawsari 32'	Stadium: Al Bayt Stadium; Attendance: 6,283; Referee: Qasim Al-Hatmi (Oman)

3 November 2026 4	(Saudi Arabia) Al Hilal	2-0	(United Arab Emirates) Shabab Al Ahli	Riyadh, Saudi Arabia
21:15	Watkins 6', 46'			Stadium: Kingdom Arena; Attendance: 17,855; Referee: Adham Makhadmeh (Jordan)

27 November 2026 5	Neftchi (Uzbekistan)	v	(Saudi Arabia) Al Hilal	Fergana, Uzbekistan
18:45				Stadium: Istiqlol Stadium

7 December 2026 6	(Saudi Arabia) Al Hilal	v	(United Arab Emirates) Al Ain	Riyadh, Saudi Arabia
21:15				Stadium: Kingdom Arena

9 February 2027 7	Al Wasl (United Arab Emirates)	v	(Saudi Arabia) Al Hilal	Dubai, United Arab Emirates
				Stadium: Zabeel Stadium

15 February 2027 8	(Saudi Arabia) Al Hilal	v	(Uzbekistan) Pakhtakor	Riyadh, Saudi Arabia
21:15				Stadium: Kingdom Arena
