= Khaled Al-Atwi =

Saudi Arabian footballer and manager

Personal information
- Full name: Khaled Fahad Al-Atwi
- Date of birth: 13 April 1977 (age 49)
- Place of birth: Dammam, Saudi Arabia
- Height: 5 ft 10 in (1.77 m)
- Position: Midfielder

Youth career
- Al-Oyon

Senior career*
Years	Team	Apps	(Gls)
- Al-Oyon

Managerial career
- 2009–2010: Al-Oyon
- 2011–2016: Al-Nojoom
- 2016–2019: Saudi Arabia U20
- 2019–2021: Al-Ettifaq
- 2022: Al-Qadsiah
- 2025: Damac
- 2026: Diriyah
- 2026: Al Fateh
Medal record
Men's football
Representing Saudi Arabia (as manager)
AFC U-19 Championship
Winner	2018 Indonesia
- * Club domestic league appearances and goals

Khaled Fahad Al-Atwi (Arabic: خالد العطوي; born 13 April 1977) is a Saudi professional football manager and former player.

Al-Atwi began his coaching career as the manager of Al-Oyon. A year later he joined Al-Nojoom and led them to the First Division. In 2016, he was appointed as the manager of Saudi Arabia U20 national team. In 2019, Al-Atwi became the manager of Pro League side Al-Ettifaq.

== Managerial career ==
Al-Atwi began his coaching career in the youth teams of Al-Oyon in 2008. He then became the assistant manager of Al-Fateh's youth team before rejoining Al-Oyoon to become the first team manager in 2009. In 2011, Al-Atwi was appointed as the first team manager of Al-Nojoom. In his 5 seasons at the club, Al-Atwi led Al-Nojoom to promotion to the Second Division and the First Division respectively. On June 14 2016, Al-Atwi was appointed as the manager of the Saudi Arabia U20 national team. He led the young Green Falcons to a first-place finish in the 2018 AFC U-19 Championship, Saudi Arabia's third title in this age level. He was also the manager during the disastrous 2019 FIFA U-20 World Cup where Saudi Arabia exited from the group stage with a catastrophic performance, losing all three games in their group. By doing so, Al-Atwi became the youngest Saudi manager to lead the national team to continental glory, and also the one with an infamous record as the worst manager of Saudi U-20 team in FIFA U-20 World Cup since the 1987 FIFA World Youth Championship. On 17 June 2019, Al-Atwi resigned from his post as the manager of the U20 national team after 3 years after the disaster in Poland. Later that day, he was announced as the manager of Pro League club Al-Ettifaq. On 14 October 2021, it was announced that Al-Atwi and Al-Ettifaq agreed to end their contract mutually and he would take charge of his last match on 16 October against Al-Ahli.

On 18 June 2022, it was announced that Al-Atwi was appointed as the new manager of First Division League side Al-Qadsiah. On 22 September 2022, Al-Atwi was sacked after 5 matches, he drew twice and lost three times.

In March 2025, he was appointed as interim manager of Damac, a position he held until the end of the 2024–25 season.

In May 2026, Al-Atwi became the head coach of Diriyah in the Saudi First Division League. He led the club to their debut appearance in the Saudi Pro League by winning the promotion play-offs. He was appointed as head coach of Al Fateh ahead of the 2026–27 season.

== Personal life ==
Al-Atwi was born in Dammam but moved to Al-Oyon, located in the Al-Ahsa Governorate, during his childhood. He is married and has four sons; Fahad, Saud, Mohammed, and Sattam. Al-Atwi graduated from King Faisal University and has a bachelor's degree in sociology. He used to work as a history teacher in a school in Urayrah. He later became a principal of a school in Al Kulabiyah.

== Managerial statistics ==
Managerial record by team and tenure
Team	Nat	From	To	Record					Ref
Team	Nat	From	To	G	W	D	L	Win %	Ref
Al-Nojoom	(Saudi Arabia)	1 July 2011	30 May 2016	107	43	36	28	40.19	
Saudi Arabia U20	(Saudi Arabia)	14 June 2016	17 June 2019	50	34	2	14	68.00	
Al-Ettifaq	(Saudi Arabia)	17 June 2019	16 October 2021	73	31	13	29	42.47	
Al-Qadsiah	(Saudi Arabia)	18 June 2022	22 September 2022	5	0	2	3	0.00	
Total				235	108	53	74	45.96	—

== Honours ==
=== Manager ===
Al-Nojoom

- Saudi Third Division: 2012–13
- Saudi Second Division runners-up: 2014–15

Saudi Arabia U20

- AFC U-19 Championship: 2018
- GCC U-19 Championship: 2016

Individual

- Saudi Professional League Manager of the Month: December 2020
