= 2026–27 Saudi Pro League =

Saudi Pro League دوري روشن السعودي
- Season: 2026–27
- Dates: 13 August 2026 – 29 May 2027
- Country: Saudi Arabia
- Matches: 105
- Goals: 317 (3.02 per match)
- Top goalscorer: Ivan Toney (14 goals)
- Best goalkeeper: Yassine Bounou (6 clean sheets)
- Biggest home win: Al-Ahli 5–0 Al-Riyadh (4 September 2026) Al-Shabab 6–1 Al-Ahli (30 October 2026)
- Biggest away win: Al-Taawoun 0–6 Al-Hilal (12 September 2026); Al-Riyadh 0-6 Al-Qadsiah (29 October 2026)
- Highest scoring: Al-Nassr 5–3 Al-Kholood (29 October 2026)
- Longest winning run: 5 matches Al-Hilal
- Longest unbeaten run: 8 matches Al-Qadsiah
- Longest winless run: 12 matches Al-Taawoun
- Longest losing run: 5 matches Al-Kholood
- Highest attendance: 47,661; Al-Ittihad 2–1 Al-Nassr (5 September 2026)
- Lowest attendance: 608; Al-Faisaly 3–2 Al-Kholood (15 October 2026)
- Total attendance: 179,508
- Average attendance: 8,159
- All statistics correct as of 20 November 2026.

The 2026–27 Saudi Pro League (known as the Roshn Saudi League for sponsorship reasons) is the 70th season of the top-tier Saudi football league, established in 1957, and the 19th season since it was rebranded as the Saudi Pro League in 2008.

The league started on 13 August 2026 and is scheduled to end on 29 May 2027. It will feature a break from 24 December to 7 February, as the country hosts the 2027 AFC Asian Cup.

The summer registration period for players began on 22 July and ended on 6 September, while the winter period is set for 3 to 31 January 2027.

== Teams ==
18 teams will compete in the league - the top 15 teams from the previous season and the 3 teams promoted from the FD League.

=== Teams who were promoted to the Pro League ===
On 11 May 2026, Abha became the first team to be promoted following their dominant run in the second tier. They were crowned champions of the Saudi First Division League. Abha returned to the top flight of Saudi football after a brief absence.

On 20 May 2026, Al-Faisaly became the second club to be promoted, sealing their automatic qualification spot. Al-Faisaly returned to the Roshn Saudi League after spending four consecutive seasons in the second tier.

On 28 May 2026, Al-Diriyah became the third and final club to be promoted after winning the promotion play-offs final. This marked Al-Diriyah's historic first-ever appearance in the top flight of Saudi Arabian football.

=== Teams who were relegated to the FD league ===
On 23 April 2026, Al-Najma were the first to be relegated following a 2–1 defeat to Al-Taawoun, ending their 1 season stint in the Pro League.

On 3 May 2026, Al-Okhdood were the second to be relegated following a 4–0 defeat to Al-Ahli, going down after 4 seasons in the Pro League.

On 21 May 2026, Damac were the final team to be relegated, following a 4–1 loss to Al Nassr on the final matchday of the season, concluding their 7 season run in the Pro League.

=== Stadiums ===
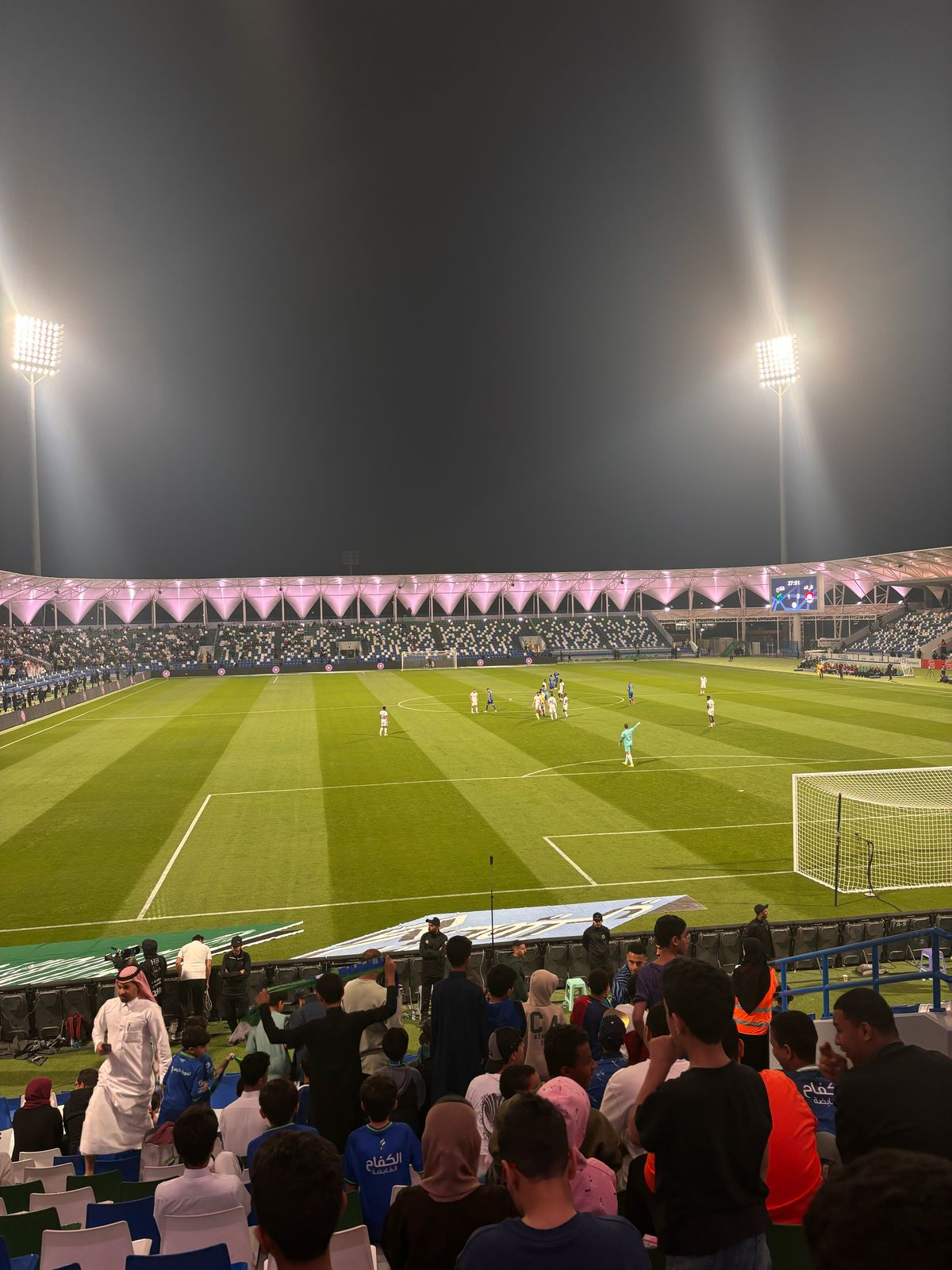
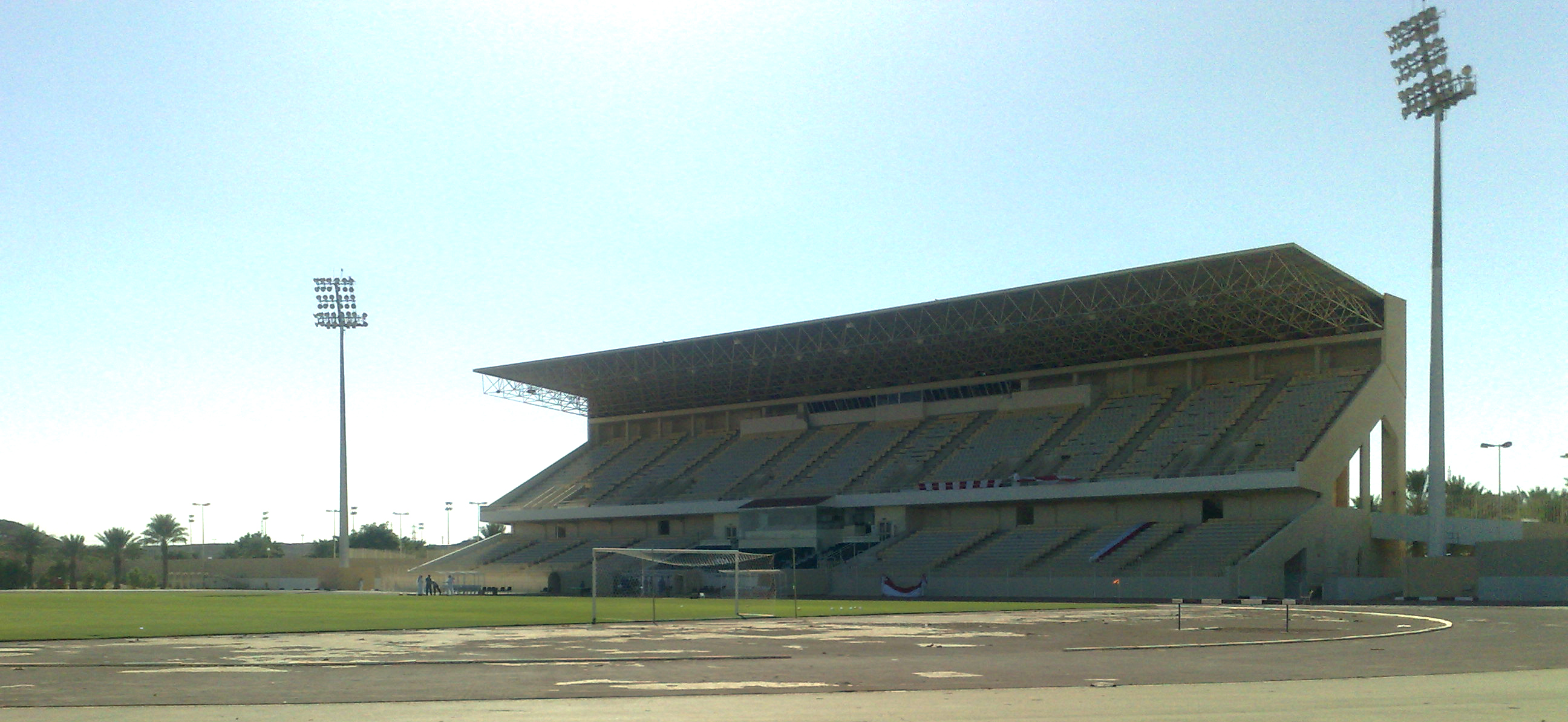
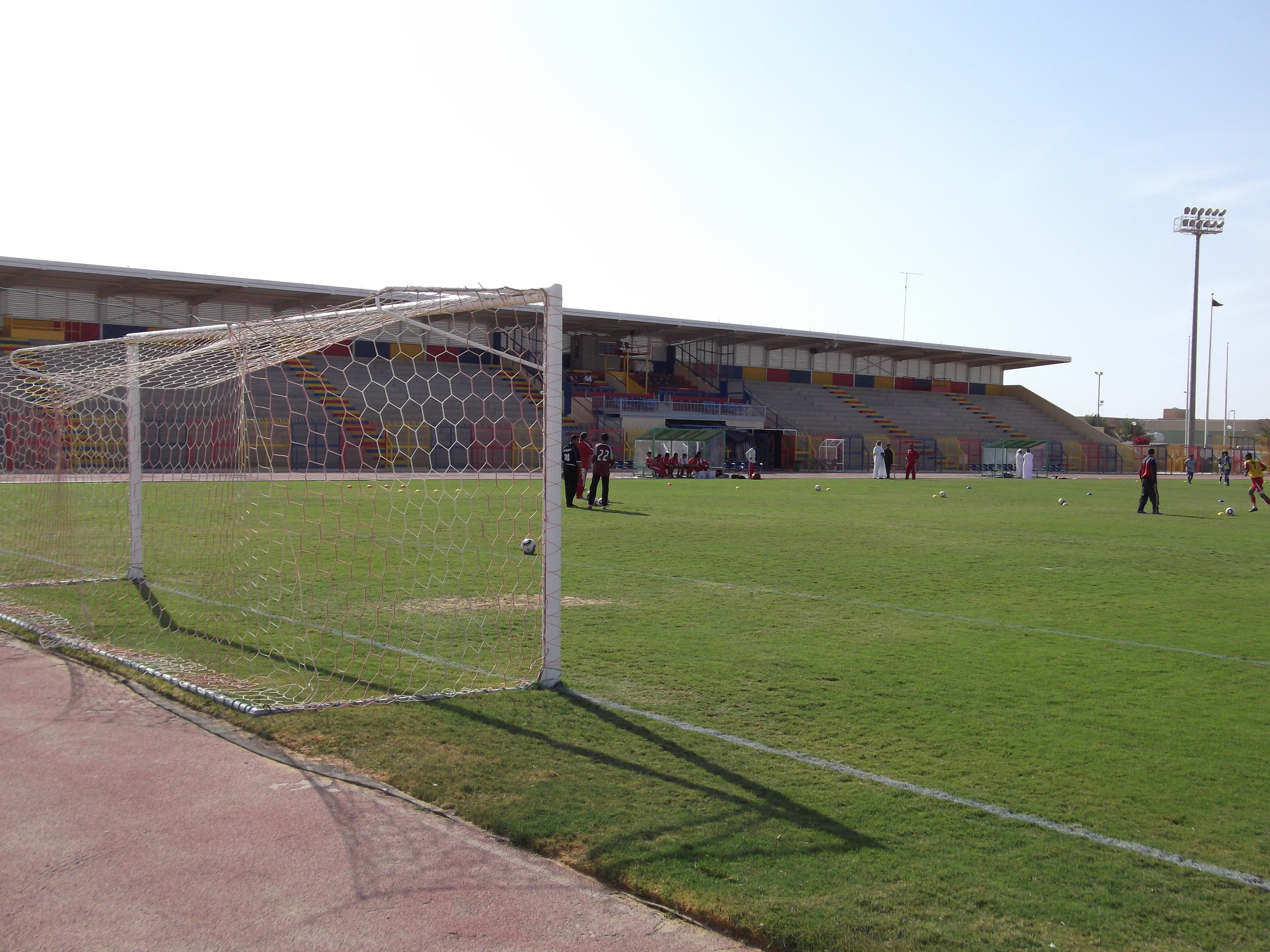
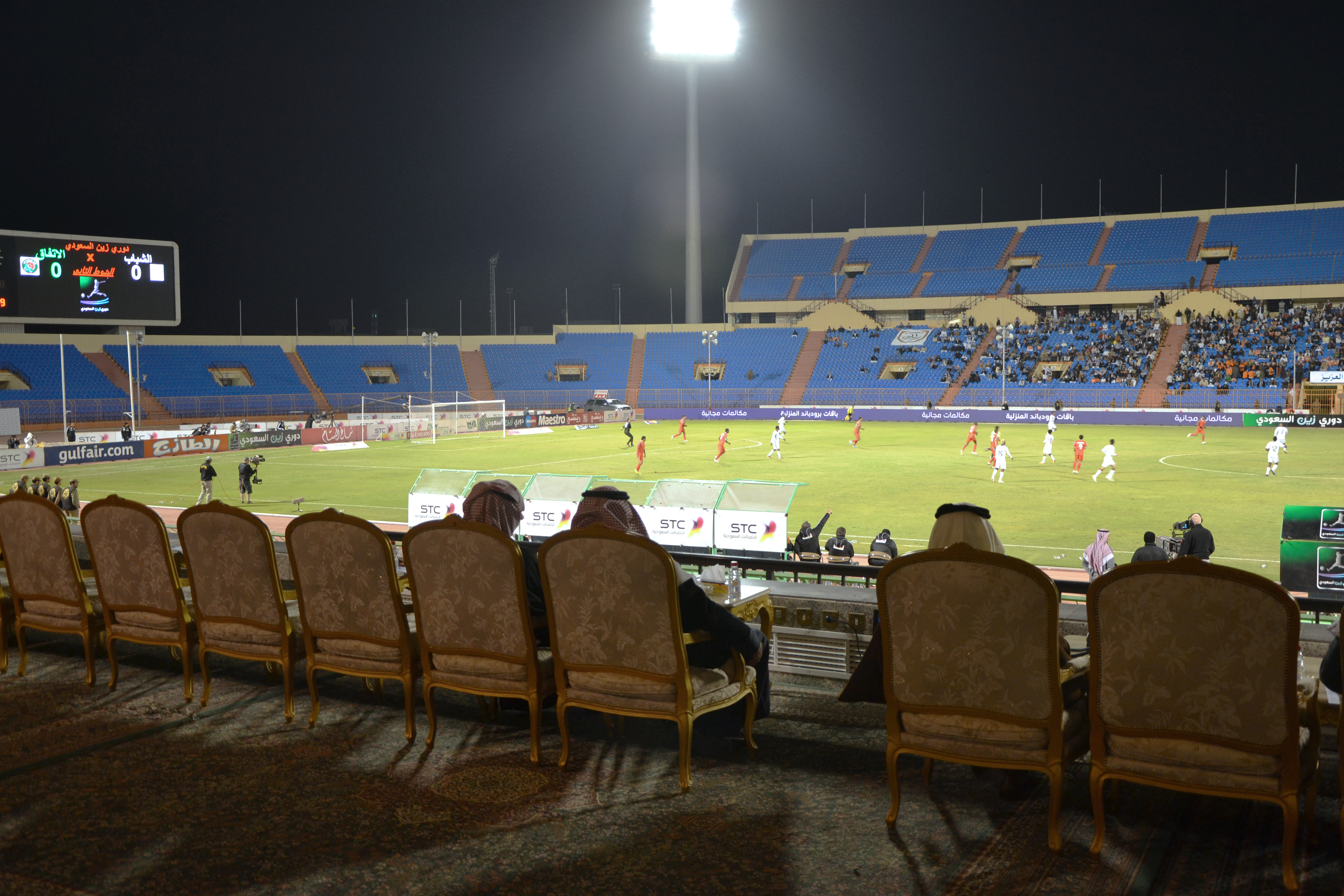
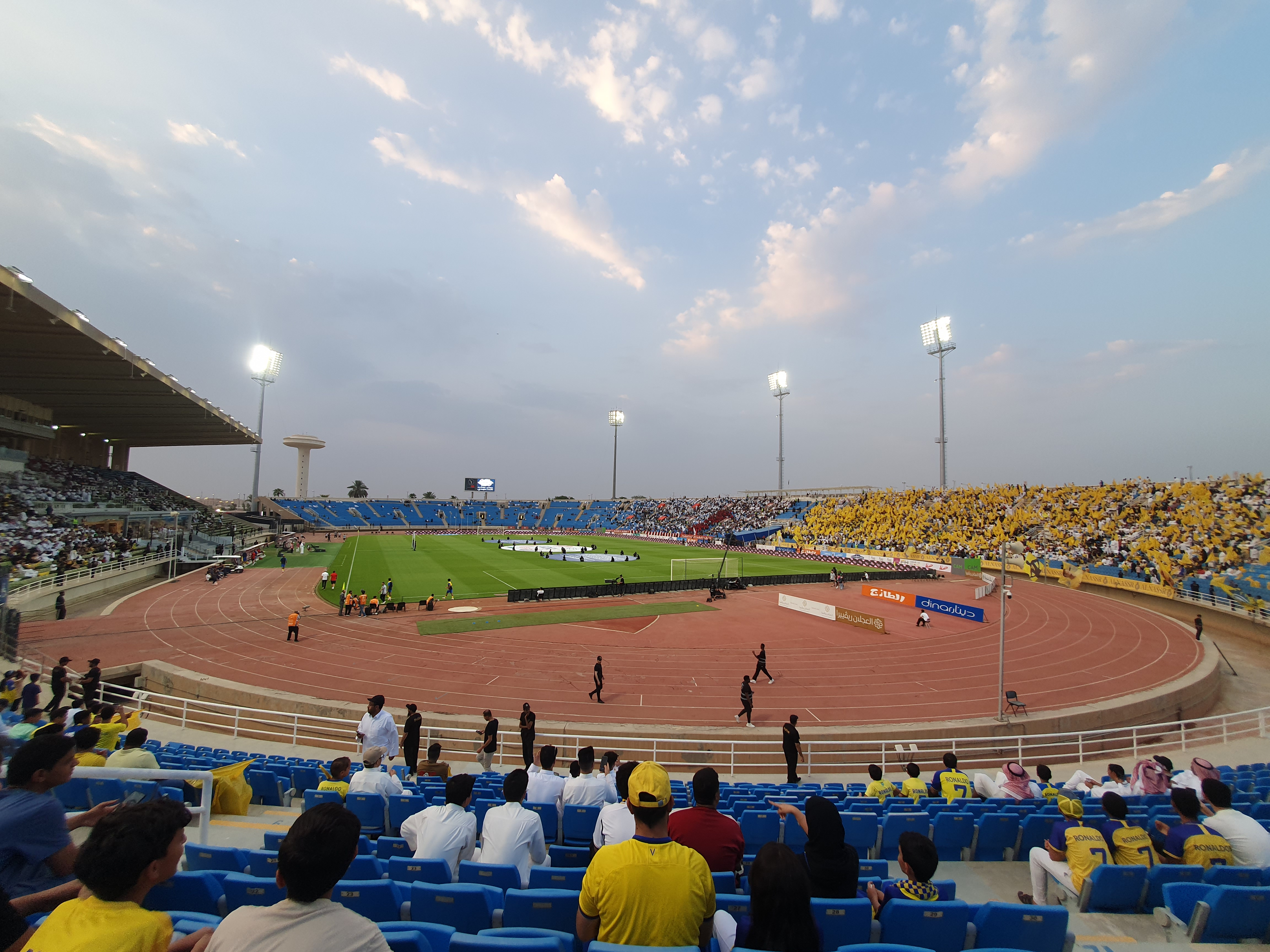
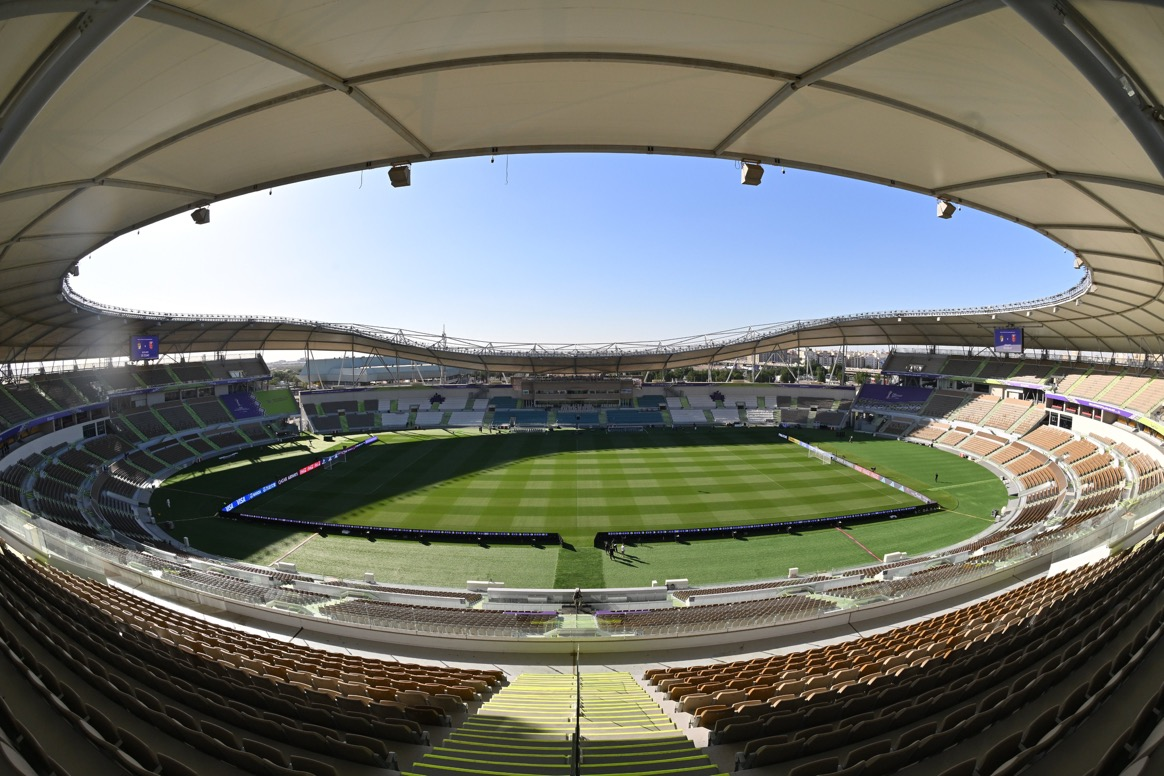
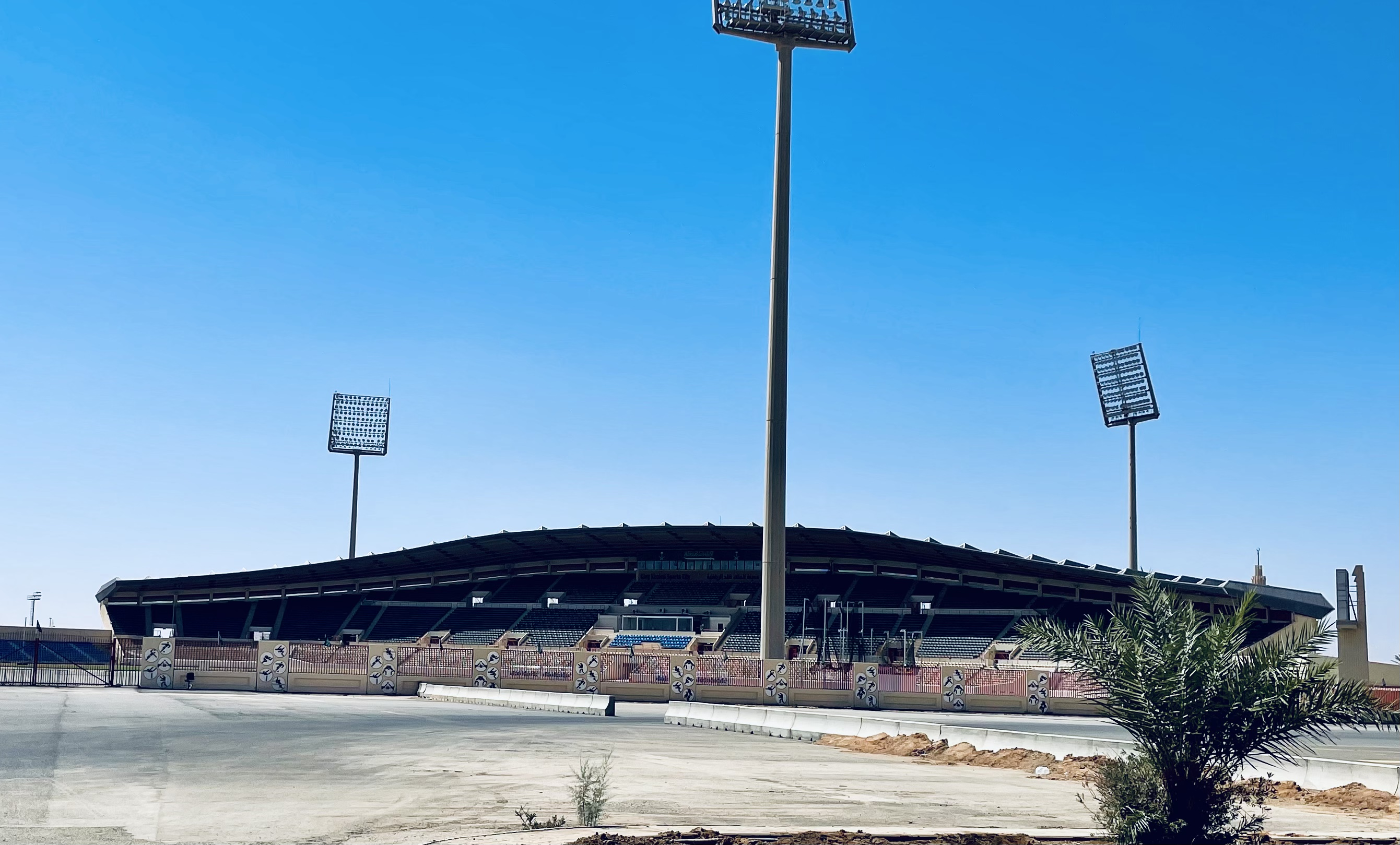
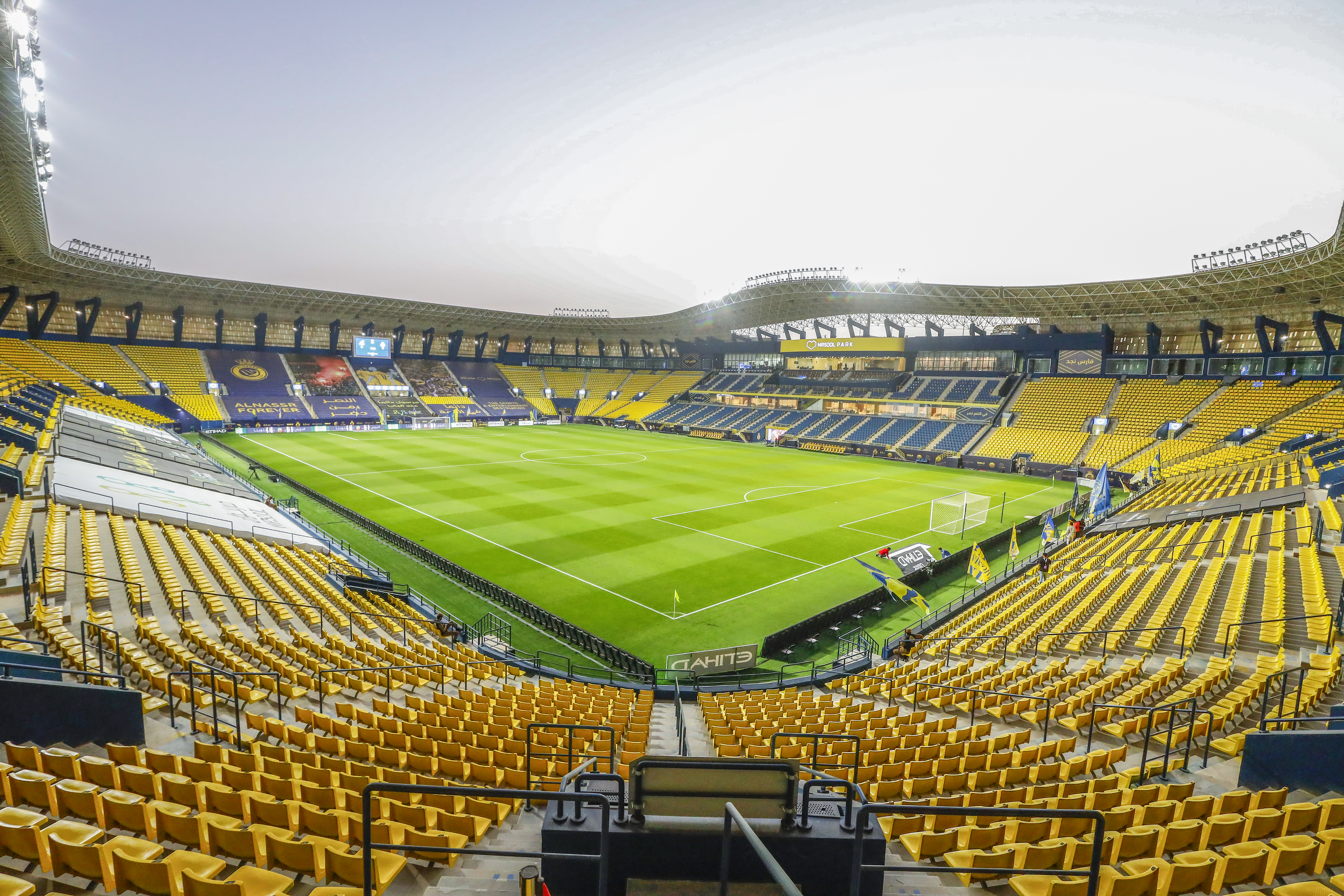

Locations of teams in the 2026–27 Saudi Pro League

Note: Table lists in alphabetical order.

Team	Location	Stadium	Capacity
Abha	Abha	Al-Mahalah Stadium; Damac Club Stadium (Khamis Mushait)	20,000; 5,000
Al-Ahli	Jeddah	King Abdullah Sports City Stadium; Al-Faisal Stadium	60,342; 27,000
Al-Diriyah	Diriyah	SHG Arena; Al-Awwal Park	13,537; 26,004
Al-Ettifaq	Dammam	EGO Stadium	12,984
Al-Faisaly	Harmah	Al-Majma'ah Sports City Stadium (Al-Majma'ah)	7,000
Al-Fateh	Al-Mubarraz	Maydan Tamweel Aloula	11,851
Al-Fayha	Majmaah	Majmaah Sports City Stadium	6,843
Al-Hazem	Ar Rass	Al-Hazem Club Stadium	5,100
Al-Hilal	Riyadh	Kingdom Arena	26,090
Al-Ittihad	Jeddah	King Abdullah Sports City Stadium; Al-Faisal Stadium	60,342; 27,000
Al-Khaleej	Saihat	Prince Mohamed bin Fahd Stadium (Dammam)	22,042
Al-Kholood	Ar Rass	Al-Hazem Club Stadium	5,100
Al-Nassr	Riyadh	Al-Awwal Park	26,004
Al-Qadsiah	Khobar	Prince Mohamed bin Fahd Stadium (Dammam)	22,042
Al-Riyadh	Riyadh	SHG Arena	13,537
Al-Shabab	Riyadh	SHG Arena	13,537
Al-Taawoun	Buraidah	King Abdullah Sports City Stadium Buraidah; Al-Taawoun Stadium	30,180; 5,624
Neom	Tabuk	King Khalid Sport City Stadium	12,000

=== Personnel and kits ===
Team	Manager	Captain	Kit manufacturer	Main sponsor	Other sponsors
Abha	(Croatia) Damir Burić	(Saudi Arabia) Zakaria Sami	Offside	Yelo	List: Front: None; Back: None; Sleeves: None; Shorts: None
Al-Ahli	(Bosnia and Herzegovina) Marino Pušić	(Senegal) Édouard Mendy	Adidas	Red Sea Global	List: Front: Saudi Investment Recycling Company, Neoleap; Back: Kayanee, Cenomi; Sleeves: None; Shorts: None
Al-Diriyah	(Portugal) Bruno Lage	(Saudi Arabia) Waleed Abdullah	Macron	Yelo, Rassin	List: Front: None; Back: None; Sleeves: None; Shorts: None
Al-Ettifaq	(Australia) Arthur Papas	(Saudi Arabia) Abdullah Khattab	Jako	Kammelna	List: Front: Aldyar Alarabiya, Tameeni Insurance; Back: Mouwasat Hospital, Xplere, Enterprise Rent-A-Car; Sleeves: Saudi Qaid Transport Company; Shorts: None
Al-Fateh	(Morocco) Jamal Sellami	(Saudi Arabia) Mohammed Al-Fuhaid	Offside	None	List: Front: Fuchsia Bakery, Tameeni Insurance; Back: Tamweel Aloula, Dallah Hospitals; Sleeves: Orinex, Freshly Kitchen; Shorts: None
Al-Faisaly	(Tunisia) Mohamed Dahmane (Caretaker)	(Saudi Arabia) Yassin Barnawi	Adidas	Aldrees, Yelo	List: Front: None; Back: None; Sleeves: None; Shorts: None
Al-Fayha	(Brazil) Fábio Carille	(Saudi Arabia) Sami Al-Khaibari	HH Sports	Basic Electronics Company	List: Front: Tameeni Insurance; Back: Al Romaih Investment; Sleeves: Morabaha Marina Financing Company; Shorts: None
Al-Hazem	(Tunisia) Jalel Kadri	(Saudi Arabia) Abdulrahman Al-Dakheel	Hattrick	Yelo	List: Front: None; Back: None; Sleeves: None; Shorts: None
Al-Hilal	(Italy) Simone Inzaghi	(Saudi Arabia) Salem Al-Dawsari	Puma	NHC Innovation	List: Front: Flynas; Back: Riyad Bank; Sleeves: Tree Digital Insurance Agency; Shorts: None
Al-Ittihad	(Germany) Jens Wissing	(Portugal) Danilo Pereira	Nike	None	List: Front: Flow Progressive Logistics; Back: None; Sleeves: TCL; Shorts: None
Al-Khaleej	(Portugal) José Gomes	(Saudi Arabia) Mohammed Al-Khabrani	Laser	Yelo Rent a Car	List: Front: Fisher Electronics, Tameeni Insurance, Almana Hospital; Back: Shemagh Al Bassam, Florina Shoes, Candy; Sleeves: Locate Food Delivery App, Saudi Qaid Transport Company; Shorts: Sayyar
Al-Kholood	(England) Des Buckingham	(Suriname) Shaquille Pinas	Kappa	Yelo Rent a Car	List: Front: Tameeni Insurance; Back: Mezaj Maghribhi, Florina Shoes, Elba Cookers; Sleeves: Saudi Qaid Transport Company; Shorts: None
Al-Nassr	(Australia) Ange Postecoglou	(Portugal) Cristiano Ronaldo	Adidas	Humain	List: Front: Gathern; Back: None; Sleeves: AROYA Cruises; Shorts: None
Al-Qadsiah	(Northern Ireland) Brendan Rodgers	(Spain) Nacho	Adidas	Aloula Aviation	List: Front: BesteBit; Back: iz, Zoho Corporation, Sixt; Sleeves: Dar wa Emaar; Shorts: Batook Nova
Al-Riyadh	(Brazil) Maurício Dulac	(Canada) Milan Borjan	Black Panther	Science Technology	List: Front: Tameeni Insurance; Back: Stars Smile; Sleeves: None; Shorts: None
Al-Shabab	(Germany) Thomas Letsch	(Belgium) Yannick Carrasco	Offside	Jetour	List: Front: Theeb Rent A Car, Tameeni Insurance; Back: Mezaj Maghribi; Sleeves: Direct for Travel & Tourism; Shorts: None
Al-Taawoun	(Serbia) Vuk Rašović	(Morocco) Aschraf El Mahdioui	Macron	Aldyar Alarabiya	List: Front: Gree Electric, Dr Tooth Clinics; Back: Al Dahayan Aluminum Panel Factory, Al Saif Trading Agencies; Sleeves: Direct KSA, Duvet Mattresses; Shorts: None
Neom	(France) Christophe Galtier	(France) Alexandre Lacazette	Adidas	Oxagon	List: Front: SHG; Back: None; Sleeves: None; Shorts: None

=== Managerial changes ===
Team	Outgoing Manager	Manner of Departure	Date of Vacancy	Position in the table	Incoming Manager	Date of Appointment
Al-Fayha	(Portugal) Pedro Emanuel	End of contract	21 May 2026	Pre-season	(Brazil) Fábio Carille	1 July 2026
Al Shabab	(Algeria) Noureddine Zekri	End of caretaker spell	22 May 2026	Pre-season	(Germany) Thomas Letsch	10 July 2026
Al-Ettifaq	(Saudi Arabia) Saad Al-Shehri	End of contract	25 May 2026	Pre-season	(Australia) Arthur Papas	3 July 2026
Al Fateh	(Portugal) José Gomes	End of contract	28 May 2026	Pre-season	(Saudi Arabia) Khaled Al-Atwi	21 July 2026
Al-Khaleej	(Uruguay) Gus Poyet	End of contract	28 May 2026	Pre-season	(Portugal) José Gomes	28 May 2026
Al-Nassr	(Portugal) Jorge Jesus	End of contract	28 May 2026	Pre-season	(Australia) Ange Postecoglou	3 July 2026
Al-Ittihad	(Portugal) Sérgio Conceição	Sacked	1 June 2026	Pre-season	(Germany) Jens Wissing	10 July 2026
Al-Diriyah	(Saudi Arabia) Khaled Al-Atwi	End of caretaker spell	30 June 2026	Pre-season	(Portugal) Bruno Lage	6 July 2026
Al-Taawoun	(Brazil) Péricles Chamusca	End of contract	30 June 2026	Pre-season	(Serbia) Žarko Lazetić	1 July 2026
Al-Ahli	(Germany) Matthias Jaissle	Signed by Newcastle United	5 August 2026	Pre-season	(Bosnia and Herzegovina) Marino Pušić	6 August 2026
Al-Taawoun	(Serbia) Žarko Lazetić	Sacked	12 September 2026	17th	(Serbia) Vuk Rašović	21 September 2026
Al-Fateh	(Saudi Arabia) Khaled Al-Atwi	Sacked	8 October 2026	15th	(Morocco) Jamal Sellami	8 October 2026
Al Faisaly	(Italy) Giovanni Solinas	Sacked	22 November 2026	15th	(Tunisia) Mohamed Dahmane (Caretaker)	22 November 2026

== Foreign players ==
The number of foreign players a club could register is ten, with eight players of any age and two players required to be aged 21 or younger. For league matches, clubs could only designate eight players as available for every match throughout the season but could designate ten as available for the King's Cup and Super Cup.

- Player names in **bold** indicate the player was registered during the mid-season transfer window.
- Player names in italics were out of the squad or left the club within the season, after the pre-season transfer window, or in the mid-season transfer window, and at least had one appearance.
- Players from other countries who were born in Saudi Arabia are counted as homegrown/local players.

Club	Player 1	Player 2	Player 3	Player 4	Player 5	Player 6	Player 7	Player 8	U21 player (s)	U19 player (s)	Unregistered player (s)	Former player (s)
Abha	(Belgium) Michy Batshuayi	(Cameroon) Georges-Kévin Nkoudou	(Curaçao) Juriën Gaari	(France) Alimami Gory	(France) Loreintz Rosier	(France) Nabil Fekir	(French Guiana) Donovan Léon	(Senegal) Abdou Diallo	(Argentina) Mateo Borrell	(France) Kamil Boumedmed		
Al-Ahli	(Armenia) Eduard Spertsyan	(Brazil) Galeno	(Brazil) Roger Ibañez	(England) Ivan Toney	(Portugal) Francisco Trincão	(Senegal) Édouard Mendy	(Turkey) Merih Demiral	(Ukraine) Artem Bondarenko	(Brazil) Matheus Gonçalves (France) Valentin Atangana (The Gambia) Abubacarr Sedi Kinteh	(France) Ibrahima Diaby		
Al-Diriyah	(Albania) Berat Djimsiti	(Algeria) Adil Boulbina	(Bosnia and Herzegovina) Nikola Vasilj	(Democratic Republic of the Congo) Chancel Mbemba	(France) Enzo Millot	(Senegal) Idrissa Gueye	(Spain) Óscar Rodríguez	(Uruguay) Darwin Núñez	(Portugal) Mathys De Carvalho (Senegal) Clayton Diandy	(Croatia) Lovro Chelfi	(France) Gaëtan Laborde	(Cameroon) Georges-Kévin Nkoudou (The Gambia) Omar Colley
Al-Ettifaq	(Brazil) Pedro Henrique	(France) Moussa Dembélé	(Kosovo) Bersant Celina	(Scotland) Jack Hendry	(Slovakia) Marek Rodák	(Slovakia) Ondrej Duda	(Spain) Álvaro Medrán	(Sweden) Jordan Larsson	(Ivory Coast) Abdoulaye Kanté	(France) Rayane Messi	(Serbia) Matija Gluščević	
Al-Faisaly	(Brazil) Andrei Girotto	(Brazil) Flávio Medeiros	(Cameroon) Christian Bassogog	(Democratic Republic of the Congo) Théo Bongonda	(Guinea-Bissau) Alexandre Mendy	(Senegal) Abdoulaye Seck	(Spain) Fernando Pacheco	(Spain) Jaime Seoane	(Gabon) André-Jordy Ella			
Al-Fateh	(Comoros) Zaydou Youssouf	(Croatia) Adrian Šemper	(Ivory Coast) Wilfried Kanga	(Morocco) Marwane Saâdane	(Morocco) Mourad Batna	(Romania) Mihai Lixandru	(Slovakia) Lukáš Haraslín	(Togo) Kennedy Boateng	(Brazil) Sorriso (Cape Verde) Jefferson Ramos (France) Ali Alamine (Morocco) Hossam Essadak			
Al-Fayha	(Brazil) Hugo Moura	(Brazil) Lázaro	(The Gambia) Omar Colley	(Guinea-Bissau) Alfa Semedo	(Panama) Orlando Mosquera	(Portugal) Paulo Oliveira	(Spain) Jason	(Zambia) Fashion Sakala	(Brazil) Yago Souza			(Republic of the Congo) Silvère Ganvoula
Al-Hazem	(Algeria) Amir Sayoud	(Algeria) Sofiane Bendebka	(Democratic Republic of the Congo) Afimico Pululu	(Czech Republic) Jindřich Staněk	(Guinea) Mory Konaté	(Netherlands) Elton Acolatse	(Rwanda) Bonheur Mugisha	(Tunisia) Mohamed Amine Ben Hamida	(Guinea) Aboubacar Bah (Mali) Aboubacar Diakité			
Al-Hilal	(Brazil) Gabriel Martinelli	(England) Ollie Watkins	(France) Theo Hernández	(Morocco) Yassine Bounou	(Netherlands) Crysencio Summerville	(Portugal) Rúben Neves	(Senegal) Kalidou Koulibaly	(Serbia) Sergej Milinković-Savić	(France) Saïmon Bouabré (Turkey) Yusuf Akçiçek	(Ivory Coast) Mohamed Kader Meïté		(Brazil) Malcom (France) Karim Benzema
Al-Ittihad	(Algeria) Houssem Aouar	(Colombia) Richard Ríos	(Morocco) Youssef En-Nesyri	(Netherlands) Georginio Wijnaldum	(Netherlands) Steven Bergwijn	(Portugal) Danilo Pereira	(Senegal) Dion Lopy	(Serbia) Predrag Rajković	(Nigeria) George Ilenikhena (Portugal) Roger Fernandes (Serbia) Jan-Carlo Simić	(France) Kassoum Koné	(Mali) Mahamadou Doumbia	(Cameroon) Stephane Keller
Al-Khaleej	(Equatorial Guinea) Omar Mascarell	(The Gambia) Musa Barrow	(Luxembourg) Anthony Moris	(Mali) Kiki Kouyaté	(New Caledonia) Angelo Fulgini	(Norway) Joshua King	(Portugal) Miguel Crespo	(Portugal) Pedro Rebocho	(Argentina) Mateo Benegas	(Cape Verde) Witcha (The Gambia) Abdoulie Mboge		
Al-Kholood	(Cameroon) Antoin Essomba	(England) John Buckley	(France) Julien Domingues	(Guinea) Seydouba Cissé	(Guinea-Bissau) Coba da Costa	(Lithuania) Edgaras Utkus	(Spain) Iker Kortajarena	(Suriname) Shaquille Pinas	(Brazil) Guga (England) Adam Berry	(Guinea) Mansour Camara	(Argentina) Ramiro Enrique	
Al-Nassr	(Brazil) Ângelo Gabriel	(Brazil) Bento	(France) Kingsley Coman	(Portugal) Cristiano Ronaldo	(Portugal) João Félix	(Portugal) Samú Costa	(Senegal) Sadio Mané	(Spain) Iñigo Martínez		(Tunisia) Yassine Salam	(France) Mohamed Simakan (Iraq) Hayder Abdulkareem	
Al-Qadsiah	(Belgium) Koen Casteels	(Germany) Julian Weigl	(Ghana) Christopher Bonsu Baah	(Italy) Mateo Retegui	(Mexico) Julián Quiñones	(Netherlands) Tijjani Reijnders	(Spain) Nacho	(Uruguay) Gastón Álvarez	(Ivory Coast) Ali Badra Diabaté (Nigeria) Suleman Sani	(France) Mahamadou Sangaré	(Uruguay) Nahitan Nández	(Portugal) Otávio (Switzerland) Cameron Puertas
Al-Riyadh	(Algeria) Victor Lekhal	(Canada) Milan Borjan	(Egypt) Trézéguet	(France) Teddy Okou	(Ghana) Bernard Mensah	(Ivory Coast) Kader Keïta	(Portugal) Leandro Antunes	(Uruguay) Rodrigo Abascal	(Argentina) Luca Ramirez			
Al-Shabab	(Belgium) Yannick Carrasco	(Colombia) Roger Martínez	(Croatia) Tin Jedvaj	(England) Josh Brownhill	(France) Yacine Adli	(Ghana) Thomas Partey	(Portugal) Daniel Podence	(Senegal) Mory Diaw	(Brazil) Ricardo Mathias (Senegal) Mamadou Thierno Barry (Serbia) Lazar Stojanović			(Brazil) Carlos
Al-Taawoun	(Albania) Nedim Bajrami	(Algeria) Zineddine Belaïd	(Brazil) Mailson	(Bulgaria) Marin Petkov	(Ivory Coast) Parfait Guiagon	(Liberia) Oscar Dorley	(Morocco) Abderrazak Hamdallah	(Netherlands) Aschraf El Mahdioui	(Ecuador) Jair Collahuazo (Morocco) Younes El Bahraoui (Senegal) Mustapha Samb			
Neom	(Algeria) Saïd Benrahma	(Argentina) Valentín Vada	(France) Alexandre Lacazette	(France) Malang Sarr	(Greece) Georgios Masouras	(Jordan) Mohannad Abu Taha	(Poland) Marcin Bułka	(Portugal) Luís Maximiano	(France) Nathan Zézé (Ivory Coast) Amadou Koné			

== Standings ==
Pos	Team	Pld	W	D	L	GF	GA	GD	Pts	Qualification
1	Al-Hilal	11	10	0	1	32	9	+23	30	AFC Champions League Elite League Stage
2	Al-Qadsiah	12	9	1	2	32	12	+20	28	AFC Champions League Elite League Stage
3	Al-Nassr	12	9	1	2	29	14	+15	28	AFC Champions League Elite League Stage
4	Al-Ahli	12	8	0	4	31	20	+11	24	AFC Champions League Elite Preliminary Stage
5	Al-Ittihad	11	7	3	1	21	11	+10	24	AFC Champions League Elite Preliminary Stage
6	Neom	12	7	1	4	18	10	+8	22	AFC Champions League Two Group Stage
7	Al-Ettifaq	12	5	4	3	18	17	+1	19	Qualification for the GFF Gulf Club Champions League group stage
8	Al-Diriyah	12	4	3	5	10	13	−3	15	Qualification for the GFF Gulf Club Champions League group stage
9	Al-Khaleej	12	3	6	3	14	19	−5	15	
10	Al-Shabab	11	3	5	3	20	15	+5	14	
11	Al-Kholood	11	3	3	5	17	26	−9	12	
12	Al-Riyadh	11	3	3	5	11	25	−14	12	
13	Al-Fayha	12	2	5	5	16	20	−4	11	
14	Al-Hazem	12	2	4	6	14	20	−6	10	
15	Al-Faisaly	12	2	4	6	13	24	−11	10	
16	Al-Fateh	12	1	3	8	10	25	−15	6	Relegation
17	Al-Taawoun	12	0	5	7	6	20	−14	5	Relegation
18	Abha	11	0	3	8	7	19	−12	3	Relegation

Updated to match(es) played on 20 November 2026. Source: Saudi Pro League

=== Positions by round ===
The following table lists the positions of teams after each week of matches. In order to preserve the chronological evolution, any postponed matches are not included in the round at which they were originally scheduled but added to the full round they were played immediately afterward.

Team ╲ Round	1	2	3	4	5	6	7	8
Abha	13	17	17	18	18	18	18	18
Al-Ahli	7	3	4	7	5	9	6	6
Al-Diriyah	14	10	9	6	9	7	8	9
Al-Ettifaq	3	4	6	9	8	8	9	7
Al-Faisaly	16	14	14	16	17	17	16	14
Al-Fateh	18	16	16	15	15	16	15	16
Al-Fayha	12	15	15	11	11	11	12	13
Al-Hazem	5	9	11	10	10	10	10	10
Al-Hilal	2	2	3	1	1	1	1	1
Al-Ittihad	8	7	2	5	4	4	2	4
Al-Khaleej	11	11	10	14	16	13	13	15
Al-Kholood	9	6	8	4	6	6	7	8
Al-Nassr	1	1	1	2	2	2	3	3
Al-Qadsiah	4	8	5	3	3	3	4	2
Al-Riyadh	15	18	18	12	12	12	11	11
Al-Shabab	17	13	13	13	14	15	14	12
Al-Taawoun	10	12	12	15	13	14	17	17
Neom	6	5	7	8	7	5	5	5

Leader and AFC Champions League Elite league stage
AFC Champions League Elite league stage
AGCFF Gulf Club Champions League group stage
Relegation to FD League

Source: spl.com.sa

== Fixtures and results ==
Home \ Away	ABH	AHL	DIR	ETT	FAI	FAT	FAY	HAZ	HIL	ITT	KHJ	KHO	NSR	QAD	RIY	SHB	TWN	NEO
Abha				0–1	0–1			1–2		1–1	1–1							
Al-Ahli	4–0							3–1			4–1		3–1		5–0			
Al-Diriyah		0–1										1–1		0–2	1–0		1–1	1–2
Al-Ettifaq			0–3		0–0					1–4	1–1		2–3		4–2			0–1
Al-Faisaly						1–1		0–0		1–3		3–2	1–3					0–2
Al-Fateh		0–4	1–2	0–1						0–0	2–3					1–3		
Al-Fayha	3–2	2–3			4–1				0–3			2–2			1–1			
Al-Hazem			0–1			2–3	2–2									1–1	1–0	1–1
Al-Hilal		3–0			4–2	2–0		1–0		3–2								0–2
Al-Ittihad			2–0				2–1	3–2				1–1	2–1					
Al-Khaleej							2–0	4–2	1–5				1–1		0–0	0–0		
Al-Kholood		3–1		0–3										0–5		2–1	3–2	
Al-Nassr	2–1		3–0			3–0						5–3					2–1	1–0
Al-Qadsiah		3–2		3–3	3–1				2–3	0–1								
Al-Riyadh													0–4	0–6			2–0	1–0
Al-Shabab		6–1			2–2		0–0		0–2					1–3	3–3		3–0	
Al-Taawoun				1–1		0–0	0–0		0–6		0–0			0–1				
Neom	2–0					4–2	2–1				3–0			0–2				

Updated to match(es) played on 20 November 2026. Source: spl.com.sa
Legend: Blue = home team win; Yellow = draw; Red = away team win.
For upcoming matches, an "a" indicates there is an article about the rivalry between the two participants.

== Season statistics ==
As of 20 November 2026

=== Top scorers ===
Rank	Player	Club	Goals
1	(England) Ivan Toney	Al-Ahli	14
2	(Portugal) Cristiano Ronaldo	Al-Nassr	9
3	(Netherlands) Tijjani Reijnders	Al-Qadsiah	8
4	(Morocco) Youssef En-Nesyri	Al-Ittihad	7
4	(Italy) Mateo Retegui	Al-Qadsiah	7
4	(France) Alexandre Lacazette	Neom	7
7	(Nigeria) George Ilenikhena	Al-Ittihad	6
7	(Brazil) Gabriel Martinelli	Al-Hilal	6
7	(France) Julien Domingues	Al-Kholood	6
7	(Portugal) Francisco Trincão	Al-Ahli	6
7	(Mexico) Julián Quiñones	Al-Qadsiah	6
7	(Belgium) Yannick Carrasco	Al-Shabab	6

==== Hat-tricks ====
Player	For	Against	Result	Date
(France) Moussa Dembélé	Al-Ettifaq	Al-Riyadh	4–2 (H)	14 August 2026
(England) Ivan Toney	Al-Ahli	Abha	4–0 (H)	22 August 2026
(Netherlands) Steven Bergwijn	Al-Ittihad	Al-Hazem	3–2 (H)	24 August 2026
(Brazil) Gabriel Martinelli	Al-Hilal	Al-Taawoun	6–0 (A)	12 September 2026
(Guinea-Bissau) Alexandre Mendy	Al-Faisaly	Al-Kholood	3–2 (H)	15 October 2026
(Portugal) Cristiano Ronaldo	Al-Nassr	Al-Kholood	5–3 (H)	29 October 2026
(Netherlands) Tijjani Reijnders	Al-Qadsiah	Al-Riyadh	6–0 (A)	29 October 2026
(Belgium) Yannick Carrasco	Al-Shabab	Al-Ahli	6–1 (H)	30 October 2026

=== Clean sheets ===
Rank	Player	Club	Clean sheets
1	(Morocco) Yassine Bounou	Al-Hilal	6
2	(Belgium) Koen Casteels	Al-Qadsiah	5
3	(Brazil) Bento	Al-Nassr	4
4	(Poland) Marcin Bułka	Neom	3
4	(Saudi Arabia) Turki Ba Al-Jawsh	Al-Ettifaq	3
4	(Spain) Fernando Pacheco	Al-Faisaly	3
4	(Brazil) Mailson	Al-Taawoun	3
4	(Luxembourg) Anthony Moris	Al-Khaleej	3
4	(Bosnia and Herzegovina) Nikola Vasilj	Al-Diriyah	3
4	(Canada) Milan Borjan	Al-Riyadh	3
4	(Serbia) Predrag Rajković	Al-Ittihad	3
