= Emad Al-Sahabi =

Saudi Arabian footballer

Personal information
- Full name: Emad Adnan Al-Sahabi
- Date of birth: November 5, 1987 (age 39)
- Place of birth: Saudi Arabia
- Height: 1.74 m (5 ft 8 1/2 in)
- Position: Left-back

Senior career*
Years	Team	Apps	(Gls)
2008–2015	Al-Riyadh		
2015–2018	Al-Orobah		
2018–2019	Al-Riyadh		
2019–2020	Al-Shoulla		
2020–2021	Al Jandal		
2022–2023	Al-Anwar		
- * Club domestic league appearances and goals

Emad Al-Sahabi (Arabic: عماد الصحابي; born October 5, 1987) is a Saudi football player who plays as a left-back.
