= 2026–27 King's Cup (Saudi Arabia) =

2026–27 King's Cup كأس الملك
The Custodian of the Two Holy Mosques' Cup كأس خادم الحرمين الشريفين

Tournament details
- Country: Saudi Arabia
- Dates: 16 August 2026 – May 2027
- Teams: 32

Tournament statistics
- Top goal scorer: (Spain) Iker Kortajarena (3 goals)

The 2026–27 King's Cup, or The Custodian of the Two Holy Mosques Cup, is the 39th edition of the King's Cup since its establishment in 1966, and the 20th edition since the tournament was relaunched in 2008. The tournament began on 16 August 2026 and will conclude with the final in May 2027.

The winner qualifies to the group stage of the 2027–28 AFC Champions League Two.

Al-Hilal are the defending champions after winning their record-extending tenth title last season.

== Participating teams ==
A total of 32 teams participated this season, 18 of which competed in the Pro League and 14 in the First Division.

League	Teams
Pro League	Abha; Al-Ahli; Al-Diriyah; Al-Ettifaq; Al-Faisaly; Al-Fateh; Al-Fayha; Al-Hazem; Al-Hilal ^{TH}; Al-Ittihad; Al-Khaleej; Al-Kholood; Al-Nassr; Al-Qadsiah; Al-Riyadh; Al-Shabab; Al-Taawoun; Neom
FD League	Al-Adalah; Al-Anwar; Al-Bukiryah; Al-Jabalain; Al-Najma; Al-Okhdood; Al-Orobah; Al-Raed; Al-Tai; Al-Ula; Al-Zulfi; Al-Wehda; Damac; Jeddah

== Round of 32 ==
The draw for the round of 32 was held on 24 May 2026. The dates for the round of 32 fixtures were announced on 24 July 2026. All times are local, SAST (UTC+3).

16 August 2026 4	Al-Bukiryah (2)	2–3	Al-Hazem (1)	Al-Bukiryah
19:15	Al-Muwallad 27'; Tunkar 68' (o.g.)	Report	Pululu 5', 37'; Tunkar 65'	Stadium: Al-Bukiryah Club Stadium; Referee: Abdullah Zarban

16 August 2026 15	Al-Orobah (2)	0–0 (a.e.t.) (3–2 p)	Abha (1)	Sakakah
19:40		Report		Stadium: Al-Orobah Club Stadium; Referee: Raed Al-Zahrani
	Penalties
	Al-Hunaiti (penalty scored); F. Al-Rashid (penalty scored); O. Al-Rashed (penalty scored); S. Al-Ruwaili (penalty missed)		(penalty missed) Fekir; (penalty missed) Al-Qahtani; (penalty scored) Al-Ghamdi; (penalty scored) Rosier; (penalty missed) Al-Subiani

16 August 2026 8	Al-Wehda (2)	3–2 (a.e.t.)	Al-Shabab (1)	Mecca
21:00	M. Khadhari 43'; Morato 91'; González 120+1' (pen.)	Report	Carrasco 56' (pen.); Brownhill 114' (pen.)	Stadium: King Abdulaziz Sports City Stadium; Referee: Abdullah Al-Shehri

17 August 2026 3	Al-Anwar (2)	1–2	Al-Ahli (1)	Hotat Bani Tamim
19:00	Bensayah 90+2'	Report	Spertsyan 61'; Galeno 89'	Stadium: Al-Anwar Club Stadium; Attendance: 3,009; Referee: Abdullah Al-Owaidan

17 August 2026 1	Al-Zulfi (2)	0–2	Al-Riyadh (1)	Al Zulfi
19:15		Report	Antunes 25', 74'	Stadium: Al-Zulfi Club Stadium; Attendance: 1,563; Referee: Faisal Al-Blwi

17 August 2026 7	Al-Tai (2)	0–5	Al-Qadsiah (1)	Ha'il
19:15		Report	Retegui 16', 45'; Bonsu Baah 34'; Mohammed al-Qahtani 46'; Álvarez 90+3'	Stadium: Prince Abdulaziz bin Musa'ed Sports City Stadium; Attendance: 1,793; Referee: José Luis Munuera Montero (Spain)

17 August 2026 6	Al-Adalah (2)	0–2	Al-Fayha (1)	Al-Hasa
21:00		Report	Moura 40', 45+2'	Stadium: Prince Abdullah bin Jalawi Sport City; Referee: Sultan Al-Harbi

17 August 2026 14	Al-Raed (2)	0–2	Al-Hilal (1)	Buraidah
21:00		Report	Neves 14' (pen.), 80'	Stadium: King Abdullah Sports City Stadium; Attendance: 3,508; Referee: Kirill Levnikov (Russia)

18 August 2026 5	Al-Najma (2)	0–3	Al-Ittihad (1)	Buraidah
19:15		Report	Ilenikhena 16', 38'; Pereira 51'	Stadium: King Abdullah Sports City Stadium; Referee: Mohammed Al-Ismail

18 August 2026 9	Al-Jabalain (2)	1–0	Al-Ettifaq (1)	Ha'il
19:15	Luvannor 42'	Report		Stadium: Prince Abdulaziz bin Musa'ed Sports City Stadium; Attendance: 809; Referee: Abdullah Al-Harbi

18 August 2026 13	Al-Okhdood (2)	2–0	Al-Khaleej (1)	Abha
19:15	Rui Pedro 37' (pen.), 79'	Report		Stadium: Prince Sultan bin Abdulaziz Sports City Stadium; Referee: Fareeh Al-Jaloud

18 August 2026 2	Al-Diriyah (1)	1–4	Al-Nassr (1)	Riyadh
21:00	Óscar 2'	Report	Simakan 11'; Félix 36', 68'; Al-Hamdan 37'	Stadium: Al-Awwal Park; Attendance: 6,272; Referee: Majed Al-Shamrani

18 August 2026 16	Al-Faisaly (1)	1–3	Neom (1)	Al-Majma'ah
21:00	Haddad 21'	Report	Benrahma 36'; Subayt 45+3' (o.g.); Lacazette 68'	Stadium: Al-Majma'ah Sports City Stadium; Referee: Mohammed Abu Shaqara

19 August 2026 12	Damac (2)	0–3	Al-Taawoun (1)	Khamis Mushait
19:15		Report	Hamdallah 45+1' (pen.); Al-Tulayhi 55'; Rajab 77'	Stadium: Damac Club Stadium; Referee: Abdullah Al-Kharboush

19 August 2026 11	Jeddah (2)	0–5	Al-Kholood (1)	Jeddah
19:30		Report	Kortajarena 3', 16', 27'; Coba 40'; Guga 46'	Stadium: Jeddah Club Stadium; Referee: Khalid Al-Ahmari

19 August 2026 10	Al-Ula (2)	3–0	Al-Fateh (1)	Medina
21:00	Quioto 4'; Barbet 23'; Sow 75' (pen.)	Report		Stadium: Prince Mohammed Bin Abdulaziz Sport City; Attendance: 4,237; Referee: Ahmed Al-Rumaikhani
