= Antoin Essomba =

Cameroonian footballer (born 2003)

Personal information
- Full name: Antoin Loic Essomba Bikoula
- Date of birth: 1 December 2003 (age 22)
- Place of birth: Cameroon
- Height: 1.77 m (5 ft 10 in)
- Position: Forward

Team information
- Current team: Al-Kholood

Youth career
- –2022: Gambinos Stars

Senior career*
Years	Team	Apps	(Gls)
2022–2024	Žilina	35	(3)
2022–2024	Žilina B	24	(8)
2025–2026	Inter Turku	48	(8)
2026–	Al-Kholood	5	(1)
- * Club domestic league appearances and goals as of 29 October 2026

Antoine Loic Essomba Bikoula (born 1 December 2003) is a Cameroonian professional footballer who currently plays as a forward for Al-Kholood in Saudi Pro League.

== Club career ==
Essomba made his Fortuna Liga debut for Žilina against MFK Skalica on 11 February 2023.

On 16 January 2025, Finnish Veikkausliiga club Inter Turku announced the signing of Essomba on a 1+1-year deal. He was named the Veikkausliiga Player of the Month in June 2025, after having scored two goals with two assists and helped Inter to stay unbeaten.

In September 2026, Essomba joined Saudi Pro League club Al-Kholood for a rumoured €1 million transfer fee.

== Career statistics ==
As of 31 August 2026

Appearances and goals by club, season and competition
Club	Season	League			National cup (Note: Includes Slovak Cup and Finnish Cup)		League cup (Note: Includes Finnish League Cup)		Europe		Total	
Club	Season	Division	Apps	Goals	Apps	Goals	Apps	Goals	Apps	Goals	Apps	Goals
Žilina	2022–23	Slovak Super Liga	9	0	0	0	–		–		9	0
Žilina	2023–24	Slovak Super Liga	26	3	4	1	–		2 (Note: Appearances in UEFA Conference League)	0	32	4
Žilina	Total		35	3	4	1	0	0	2	0	41	4
Žilina B	2022–23	Slovak 2. Liga	17	8	–		–		–		17	8
Žilina B	2023–24	Slovak 2. Liga	5	0	–		–		–		5	0
Žilina B	2024–25	Slovak 2. Liga	2	0	–		–		–		2	0
Žilina B	Total		24	8	0	0	0	0	0	0	24	8
Inter Turku	2025	Veikkausliiga	27	7	2	0	7	2	–		36	9
Inter Turku	2026	Veikkausliiga	21	1	3	0	3	0	8	0	35	1
Inter Turku	Total		48	8	5	0	10	2	8	0	71	10
Al-Kholood	2026–27	Saudi Pro League	1	0	0	0	0	0	0	0	1	0
Career total			108	19	9	1	10	2	10	0	136	22

== Honours ==
Inter Turku

- Finnish Cup: 2026
- Finnish League Cup: 2025, 2026

Individual

- Veikkausliiga Player of the Month: June 2025
