= Maurício Dulac =

Brazilian football manager (born 1979)

Personal information
- Full name: Maurício Corrêa Dulac
- Date of birth: 6 November 1979 (age 46)
- Place of birth: Porto Alegre, Rio Grande do Sul, Brazil

Team information
- Current team: Al-Riyadh (head coach)

Managerial career
- Years: Team
- 2025–2026: Al-Riyadh U21
- 2026–: Al-Riyadh

Maurício Corrêa Dulac (born 6 November 1979) is a Brazilian football manager who is the head coach of Saudi Pro League club Al-Riyadh. He was appointed first-team manager in February 2026 after previously coaching the club's under-21 side.

== Early life ==
Maurício Corrêa Dulac was born on 6 November 1979 in Porto Alegre, Rio Grande do Sul, Brazil.

== Coaching career ==
=== Early career ===
Dulac worked as a tactical analyst and assistant coach in Brazilian football before becoming a first-team manager. He worked with coaches including Mano Menezes, Dunga and Tite during his analytical career.

=== Al-Riyadh U21 ===
In 2025, Dulac became head coach of Al-Riyadh's under-21 team.

=== Al-Riyadh ===
On 11 February 2026, Al-Riyadh promoted Dulac to head coach of the first team in the Saudi Pro League.

== Managerial statistics ==
Years	Team
2025–2026	Al-Riyadh U21
2026–	Al-Riyadh
