= Iván Medina =

Spanish footballer

Personal information
- Full name: Iván Medina Ortega
- Date of birth: 3 March 2004 (age 22)
- Place of birth: Telde, Spain
- Height: 1.75 m (5 ft 9 in)
- Position: Attacking midfielder

Team information
- Current team: Las Palmas
- Number: 30

Youth career
- La Garita
- 2012–2023: Las Palmas

Senior career*
Years	Team	Apps	(Gls)
2023–	Las Palmas B	86	(18)
2026–	Las Palmas	0	(0)
- * Club domestic league appearances and goals as of 10 June 2026

Iván Medina Ortega (born 3 March 2004) is a Spanish footballer who plays for UD Las Palmas. Mainly an attacking midfielder, he can also play as a left winger.

== Career ==
Born in La Garita, Telde, Las Palmas, Canary Islands, Medina joined UD Las Palmas' youth sides in 2012, from hometown side CF La Garita. In 2023, after scoring 17 goals with the Juvenil side, he was promoted to the reserves in Tercera Federación, also making the pre-season with the first team.

After impressing with the B-side in the 2025–26 Segunda Federación by scoring nine goals, Medina made his first team debut on 7 June 2026, coming on as a late substitute for Lorenzo Amatucci in a 1–0 home loss to Málaga CF, for the first leg of the Segunda División promotion play-offs.
