= Ângelo Gabriel =

Brazilian footballer (born 2004)

Ângelo
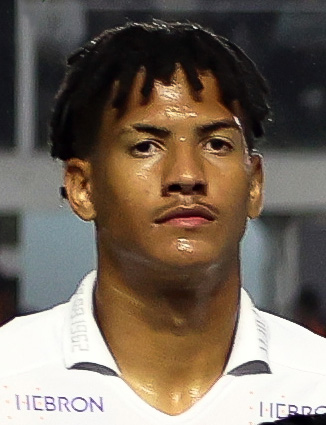
- Ângelo in 2022 with Santos

Personal information
- Full name: Ângelo Gabriel Borges Damaceno
- Date of birth: 21 December 2004 (age 21)
- Place of birth: Brasília, Brazil
- Height: 1.80 m (5 ft 11 in)
- Positions: Midfielder; winger

Team information
- Current team: Al-Nassr
- Number: 20

Youth career
- 2015–2020: Santos

Senior career*
| Years | Team | Apps | (Gls) |
| 2020–2023 | Santos | 95 | (3) |
| 2023–2024 | Chelsea | 0 | (0) |
| 2023–2024 | → Strasbourg (loan) | 21 | (0) |
| 2024– | Al-Nassr | 61 | (10) |

International career^{‡}
| 2019–2020 | Brazil U15 | 10 | (1) |
| 2021 | Brazil U17 | 2 | (0) |
| 2022– | Brazil U20 | 3 | (0) |
- * Club domestic league appearances and goals as of 20:52, 20 November 2026 (UTC) ‡ National team caps and goals as of 02:41, 16 September 2022 (UTC)

Ângelo Gabriel Borges Damaceno (born 21 December 2004), known as Ângelo Gabriel (Brazilian Portuguese: [ˈɐ̃ʒelu gabɾiˈɛw]) or simply Ângelo, is a Brazilian professional footballer who plays as a midfielder or winger for the Saudi Pro League club Al-Nassr.

== Club career ==
=== Santos ===
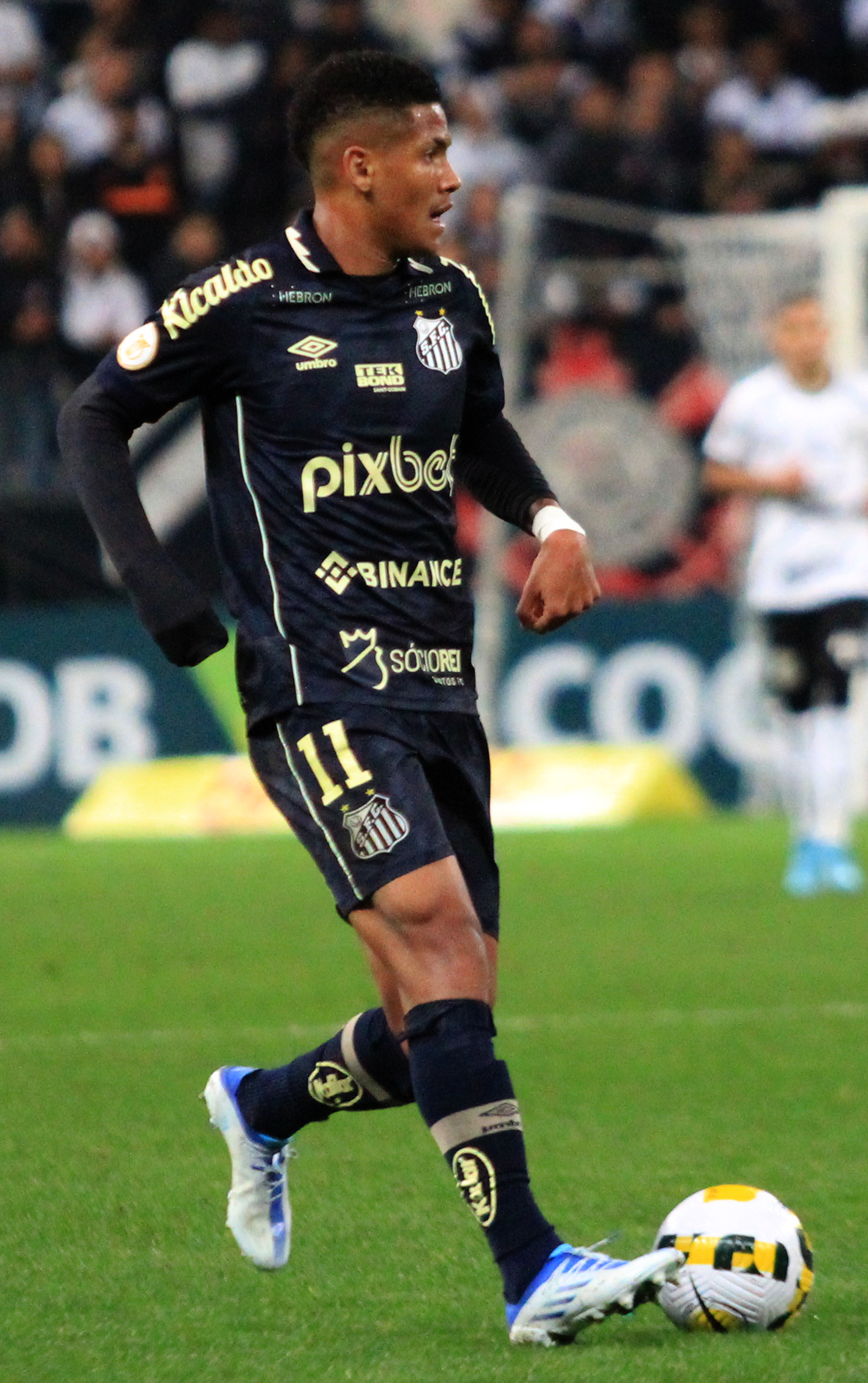
Ângelo playing for Santos in 2022

Born in Brasília, Federal District, Ângelo joined Santos' youth setup in 2015, aged ten. In July 2020, aged only 15, he started to appear for the under-20s, being subsequently promoted to the main squad in October by manager Cuca.

On 23 October 2020, Ângelo agreed to a professional pre-contract deal with Peixe, effective as of his 16th birthday. He made his professional debut two days later, coming on as a second-half substitute for Lucas Braga in a 3–1 away loss against Fluminense for the Brazilian Série A championship; aged 15 years, 10 months and 4 days, he became the second-youngest ever player to debut for the club, only behind Coutinho, and overcame Pelé by 11 days.

Ângelo made his Copa Libertadores debut on 9 March 2021, starting in a 2–1 home success over Deportivo Lara; aged 16 years, 2 months and 16 days, he became the youngest Santos player to appear in the competition, surpassing Rodrygo.

Ângelo scored his first professional goal on 6 April 2021, netting his team's third in a 3–1 Libertadores away win against San Lorenzo; aged 16 years, 3 months and 16 days, he broke Juan Carlos Cárdenas' record and became the youngest player ever to score in a Libertadores match. On 10 December, after featuring regularly, he renewed his contract until December 2024.

=== Chelsea ===
On 16 July 2023, Ângelo agreed to join Premier League side Chelsea, signing a long-term deal for a fee in the region of £13 million.

==== Loan to Strasbourg ====
On 8 August 2023, Ângelo was loaned out to Ligue 1 club Strasbourg until the end of the season.

He made his debut as a substitute in the opening league game against Lyon, where his team won 2–1. Ângelo made his full 90 minute debut on 17 September in his fourth league game against Montpellier. In a follow-up league match against Metz, he assisted the only goal where his team won the game 1–0, and was named Man of the Match by the Strasbourg's supporters. He was named as the club's Player of the Month for September.

Ângelo then also contributed two more assists for Strasbourg, including setting up a winning goal against Lille on 20 December 2023. Having initially trouble settling in since joining the club, he became a first team regular, playing in the winger position. However, Ângelo was out on two occasions, due to injuries, including one that saw him out for the rest of the season. At the end of the 2023–24 season, he had made 21 appearances in all competitions. Following this, Ângelo returned to his parent club.

=== Al-Nassr ===
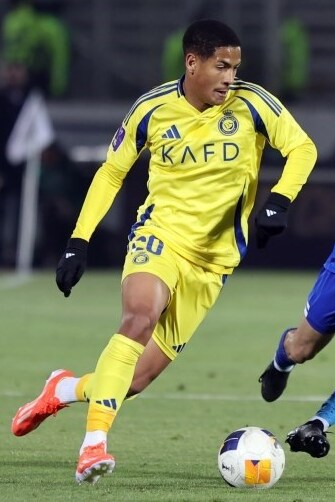
Ângelo with Al-Nassr in 2025

On 3 September 2024, Ângelo completed a transfer to Saudi Pro League side Al-Nassr. The fee was reported by The Athletic to be in the region of £19.4 million (€23 million).

== International career ==
Ângelo represented Brazil under-15s in 2019, scoring in a 4–0 defeat of Uruguay on 27 September and taking part of the 2019 South American U-15 Championship in November.

On 6 March 2020, Ângelo was called up with the under-16s for the year's Montaigu Tournament, but the competition was later suspended due to the COVID-19 pandemic. In October, he was called up to the under-17s for trainings in the following month, but tested positive for COVID-19 during that period.

== Personal life ==
During his time at Strasbourg, Ângelo began taking French lessons, learning the language.

== Career statistics ==
As of match played 2 November 2026

| Club | Season | League | | | State league (Note: Includes Campeonato Paulista) | | National cup (Note: Includes Copa do Brasil, Coupe de France, King's Cup) | | Continental | | Other | | Total | |
| Club | Season | Division | Apps | Goals | Apps | Goals | Apps | Goals | Apps | Goals | Apps | Goals | Apps | Goals |
|---|---|---|---|---|---|---|---|---|---|---|---|---|---|---|
| Santos | 2020 | Série A | 9 | 0 | — | | 0 | 0 | 0 | 0 | — | | 9 | 0 |
| Santos | 2021 | Série A | 19 | 0 | 9 | 0 | 5 | 0 | 9 (Note: Eight appearances and one goal in Copa Libertadores, one appearance in Copa Sudamericana) | 1 | — | | 42 | 1 |
| Santos | 2022 | Série A | 27 | 1 | 10 | 0 | 5 | 1 | 4 (Note: Appearances in Copa Sudamericana) | 0 | — | | 46 | 2 |
| Santos | 2023 | Série A | 12 | 2 | 9 | 0 | 6 | 0 | 5 | 0 | — | | 32 | 2 |
| Santos | Total | | 67 | 3 | 28 | 0 | 16 | 1 | 18 | 1 | — | | 129 | 5 |
| Strasbourg (loan) | 2023–24 | Ligue 1 | 21 | 0 | — | | 4 | 0 | — | | — | | 25 | 0 |
| Al-Nassr | 2024–25 | Saudi Pro League | 25 | 1 | — | | 2 | 0 | 11 (Note: Appearances in AFC Champions League Elite) | 1 | — | | 38 | 2 |
| Al-Nassr | 2025–26 | Saudi Pro League | 25 | 4 | — | | 2 | 1 | 11 (Note: Appearances in AFC Champions League Two) | 3 | 2 (Note: Appearances in Saudi Super Cup) | 0 | 40 | 8 |
| Al-Nassr | 2026–27 | Saudi Pro League | 10 | 5 | — | | 1 | 0 | 3 | 2 | 0 | 0 | 14 | 7 |
| Al-Nassr | Total | | 60 | 10 | — | | 5 | 1 | 25 | 6 | 2 | 0 | 92 | 17 |
| Career total | | | 148 | 13 | 28 | 0 | 25 | 2 | 43 | 7 | 2 | 0 | 246 | 22 |

== Honours ==
Al-Nassr

- Saudi Pro League: 2025–26
