= Leandro Antunes =

Portuguese footballer

Personal information
- Full name: Leandro Miguel Curto Antunes
- Date of birth: 28 July 1997 (age 29)
- Place of birth: Rio Maior, Portugal
- Height: 1.83 m (6 ft 0 in)
- Positions: Forward; winger

Team information
- Current team: Al-Riyadh
- Number: 77

Youth career
- 2006–2008: Belenenses
- 2008–2014: NS Rio Maior
- 2014–2015: União de Leiria
- 2015–2016: Braga

Senior career*
Years	Team	Apps	(Gls)
2016–2019	Braga B	38	(8)
2019–2021	Vilafranquense	15	(1)
2019–2020	→ Marinhense (loan)	25	(13)
2021–2024	União de Leiria	91	(19)
2024–2026	Feirense	54	(15)
2026–	Al-Riyadh	17	(8)
- * Club domestic league appearances and goals as of 25 August 2026

Leandro Miguel Curto Antunes (born 28 July 1997) is a Portuguese professional footballer who plays as a forward or winger for Saudi Pro League club Al-Riyadh.

== Club career ==
On 6 August 2016, Antunes made his professional debut with Braga B in a 2016–17 LigaPro match against Fafe.

== Honours ==
União de Leiria

- Liga 3: 2022–23

Individual

- Liga Portugal 2 Goal of the Month: September 2023
