= Julien Domingues =

French footballer (born 2000)

Personal information
- Date of birth: 22 December 1995 (age 30)
- Place of birth: Arles, France
- Height: 1.88 m (6 ft 2 in)
- Position: Forward

Team information
- Current team: Al-Kholood Club
- Number: 22

Youth career
- –2002: Olympique de Comps
- 2002–2006: FC Jonquierois
- 2006–2010: Stade Beaucairois FC
- 2010–2013: AC Arlésien

Senior career*
Years	Team	Apps	(Gls)
2014–2015	JSO Aubord		
2015–2018	US Le Pontet Grand Avignon 84		
2018–2019	US Marseille Endoume		
2019–2020	US Saint-Malo	19	(3)
2020–2021	Trélissac-Antonne Périgord FC	9	(3)
2021–2025	AS Cannes	94	(33)
2025–2026	Dijon FCO	31	(14)
2026–	Al-Kholood Club	11	(6)
- * Club domestic league appearances and goals as of 29 October 2026

Julien Domingues (born 22 December 1995) is a French professional footballer who plays as a forward for Al-Kholood Club.

== Early life ==
Domingues was born on 22 December 1995 and is of Portuguese descent through his parents. Born in Arles, France, he is a native of Gard, France. Growing up, he studied metalworking.

== Career ==
As a youth player, Domingues joined the youth academy of Olympique de Comps. Following his stint there, he joined the youth academy of FC Jonquierois in 2002. Subsequently, he signed for US Marseille Endoume in 2018, where he suffered a knee injury while playing for the club.

During the summer of 2021, he signed for AS Cannes, helping the club reach the semifinals of the 2024–25 Coupe de France. Four years later, he signed for Dijon FCO, helping the club achieve promotion from the third tier to the second tier. Ahead of the 2026–27 season, he signed for Saudi Arabian side Al-Kholood Club.

== Style of play ==
Domingues plays as a forward and is right-footed. French newspaper Ouest-France wrote in 2025 "capable of making runs in behind the defense, technically polished for his size, and skilled at holding up the ball with his back to the goal".
