= 2026 Saudi Super Cup =

Tournament details
- Host country: Kuwait
- Dates: 19–23 December 2026
- Teams: 4

2026 Saudi Super Cup will be the 13th edition of the Saudi Super Cup, an annual football competition organised by the Saudi Arabian Football Federation for successful clubs in the Saudi football system. The tournament is scheduled to take place in Kuwait in December 2026. Specifically in the Jaber Al-Ahmad International Stadium.

Four teams will participate in the competition: Al-Nassr, Al-Ahli, Al-Qadsiah, and Al-Kholood. The semi-finals are scheduled to be played on 19 and 20 December, with the final scheduled to be played on 23 December 2026.

== Qualification ==
The competition features four teams from the 2025–26 Saudi football season. The qualification system is based on the results of the 2025–26 Saudi Pro League and the 2025–26 King's Cup.

Al-Nassr qualified as the 2025–26 Saudi Pro League champions. Al-Ahli qualified after finishing third in the league, while Al-Qadsiah qualified after finishing fourth. Al-Kholood entered the competition as runners-up of the 2025–26 King's Cup. King's Cup winners and Pro League runners-up Al-Hilal will not participate in the 2026 edition; the club was excluded following the disciplinary consequences related to its withdrawal from the previous edition of the competition.

=== Qualified teams ===
The following four teams qualified for the tournament.

Team	Method of qualification	Appearance	Last appearance as	Years performance		
Team	Method of qualification	Appearance	Last appearance as	Winner(s)	Runners-up	Semi-finalists
Al-Nassr	2025–26 Saudi Pro League winners	9th	2025 runners-up	2	4	2
Al-Kholood	2025–26 King's Cup runners-up	1st	0 (debut)	–	–	–
Al-Ahli	2025–26 Saudi Pro League third place	4th	2025 winners	2	–	1
Al-Qadsiah	2025–26 Saudi Pro League fourth place	2nd	2025 semi-finalists	–	–	1
