= Al-Anwar Club =

Saudi Arabian association football team

Al-Anwar
- Full name: Al-Anwar Club
- Founded: 1973
- Ground: Al-Anwar Club Stadium
- Capacity: 8000
- Manager: Sultan Khamis
- League: Saudi First Division League
- 2025-26: 12th
Home colours	Away colours

Al-Anwar Club is a Saudi Arabian football team in Hotat Bani Tamim City playing at the Saudi Second Division.

== Al-Anwar Club Stadium ==
Al-Anwar Club Stadium, is a multi-use stadium in Hotat Bani Tamim, Saudi Arabia. It is currently used mostly for football matches, on club level by Al-Anwar. The stadium has a capacity of 8,000

Al-Anwar Club Stadium
- Interactive map of Al-Anwar Club Stadium
- Full name: Al-Anwar Club Stadium
- Location: Hotat Bani Tamim, Saudi Arabia
- Coordinates: 23°30′46.5″N 46°53′16.7″E
- Owner: General Presidency of Youth Welfare
- Capacity: 8,000
- Surface: Grass

Construction
- Opened: 2019
- Cost: 60 million S.R

Tenant
- Al-Anwar

== Current squad ==
As of Saudi First Division League:

Note: Flags indicate national team as defined under FIFA eligibility rules; some limited exceptions apply. Players may hold more than one non-FIFA nationality.

No.	Pos.	Nation	Player
1	GK	KSA	Khalid Sharahili
3	MF	KSA	Sulaiman Al-Nakhli
5	DF	KSA	Hossam Majrashi
6	MF	KSA	Abdulaziz Damdam
8	MF	CMR	Appolinaire Kack
10	MF	KSA	Faisal Al-Mojalli
14	MF	KSA	Abdullah Majrashi
17	DF	KSA	Abdulmalek Al-Shammeri
18	MF	KSA	Ibrahim Al-Meatesh
20	FW	KSA	Mohammed Majrashi
21	DF	KSA	Saif Al-Qeshtah
22	GK	KSA	Mazen Hazazi
23	DF	KSA	Hamad Al-Aqeeli

No.	Pos.	Nation	Player
31	FW	KSA	Khaled Al-Owais
37	GK	KSA	Nawaf Al-Doss
47	MF	KSA	Nuhayer Al-Mahri
70	MF	KSA	Khalid Kaabi
99	FW	ALG	Rédha Bensayah
—	DF	ALG	Chamseddine Derradji
—	DF	KSA	Fahad Al-Munaif
—	DF	KSA	Mohammed Al-Ghamdi
—	MF	KSA	Mohammed Al-Hazmi
—	MF	KSA	Abdullah Al-Samti
—	FW	KSA	Mohammed Al-Harthi
—	FW	BRA	Bruno Bezerra
—	FW	KSA	Eissa Al Thakrallah

== See also ==
- List of football clubs in Saudi Arabia
