= George Ilenikhena =

Nigerian footballer (born 2006)

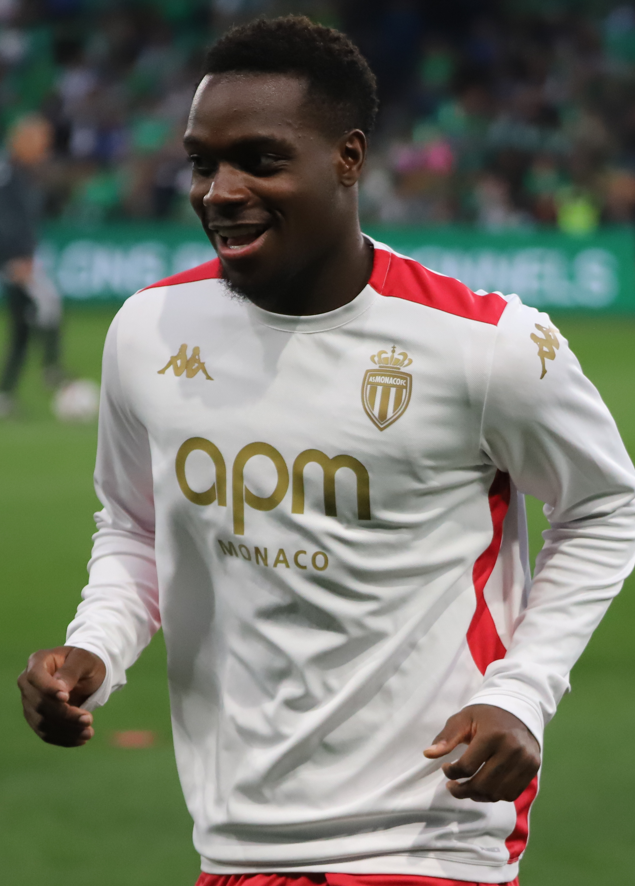
- Ilenikhena with Monaco in 2025

Personal information
- Full name: George Osazehmen Ilenikhena
- Date of birth: 16 August 2006 (age 20)
- Place of birth: Lagos, Nigeria
- Height: 1.85 m (6 ft 1 in)
- Position: Forward

Team information
- Current team: Al-Ittihad
- Number: 9

Youth career
- 2009–2021: Antony FE
- 2021–2022: Amiens

Senior career*
Years	Team	Apps	(Gls)
2022–2023	Amiens B	10	(6)
2022–2023	Amiens	17	(2)
2023–2024	Antwerp	37	(8)
2024–2026	Monaco	38	(5)
2026–	Al-Ittihad	11	(6)

International career^{‡}
2026–	Nigeria	2	(1)
- * Club domestic league appearances and goals as of 30 October 2026 ‡ National team caps and goals as of 29 September 2026

George Osazehmen Ilenikhena (born 16 August 2006) is a Nigerian professional footballer who plays as a forward for Saudi Pro League club Al-Ittihad and the Nigeria national team.

== Early life ==
Born in Lagos, Nigeria, George Ilenikhena arrived in France aged 3, growing up in Antony, Hauts-de-Seine.

== Club career ==
=== Early Career ===
Having made his way through all of the youth levels of the amateur Antony Football Evolution, George Ilenikhena joined the professional club of Amiens that was just relegated to Ligue 2, for the 2021–22 season. During that season he scored a total of 24 goals for the under-17 national side, also playing and scoring in the Coupe Gambardella. This drew the attention of clubs in France and abroad during the summer 2022, while he was still just aged 15. Ilenikhena made his professional debut for the Amiens SC on 19 November 2022, during a 10–0 home Coupe de France win to the Aiglon du Lamentin. He came on as a substitute for Jérémy Gelin, as his side was already 8–0 up. Having fully moved from the youth teams to the National 3 reserve team, Ilenikhena still kept on training regularly with the first team.

=== Royal Antwerp ===
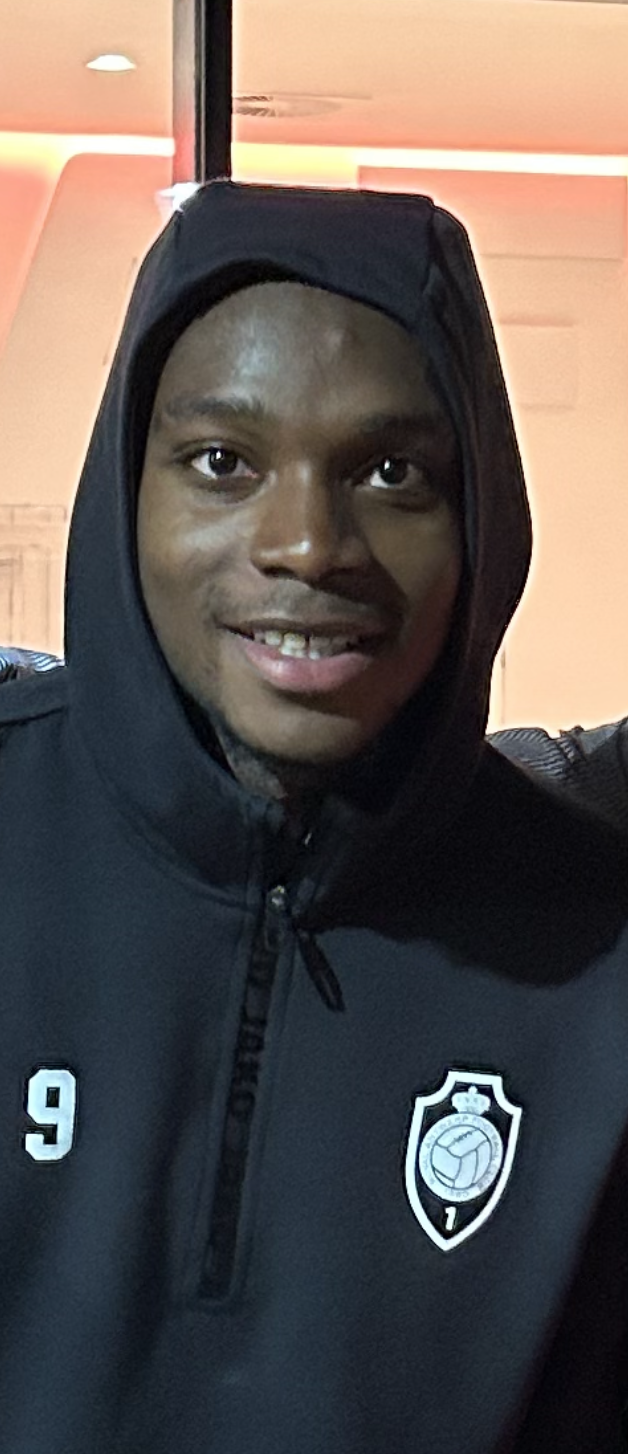
Ilenikhena with Royal Antwerp in 2023

On 29 June 2023, Ilenikhena signed for Belgian Pro League champions, Royal Antwerp, on a four-year deal, for a reported fee of €6 million. On 11 October, he was named by English newspaper The Guardian as one of the best players born in 2006 worldwide. On 13 December, he scored his first Champions League goal in the 92nd minute of stoppage time, securing a 3–2 victory against Barcelona to be his club's first ever win in the competition.

=== AS Monaco ===
On 25 July 2024, Ilenikhena signed for Ligue 1 Club, AS Monaco. Later that year, on 19 September, he scored his first goal for the club, securing a 2–1 victory against Barcelona in the opening match of the Champions League league phase.

=== Al-Ittihad ===
On 3 February 2026, Ilenikhena moved to Saudi Pro League club Al-Ittihad from AS Monaco for a reported fee of €33 million, signing as a replacement for Karim Benzema.

== International career ==
Ilenikhena first featured with France youth teams in the summer of 2021, as he was selected with the Under-16.. Ilenikhena switched allegiance to Nigeria and made a scoring debut for the Super Eagles in their first match of the 2027 Afcon qualifiers on September 25th, 2026.

== Style of play ==
Ilenikhena is a quick centre-forward, Philippe Hinschberger, the coach of his debut with Amiens, describes him as a strong left-footed player, with an outstanding ability to attack the depth of the field.

He mentioned Cristiano Ronaldo and Kylian Mbappé as his two favourite players.

== Career statistics ==
=== Club ===
As of match played 24 January 2026

Appearances and goals by club, season and competition
Club	Season	League			National cup (Note: Includes Coupe de France, Belgian Cup)		Europe		Other		Total	
Club	Season	Division	Apps	Goals	Apps	Goals	Apps	Goals	Apps	Goals	Apps	Goals
Amiens B	2022–23	Championnat National 3	10	6	–		–		–		10	6
Amiens	2022–23	Ligue 2	17	2	1	0	–		–		18	2
Royal Antwerp	2023–24	Belgian Pro League	37	8	5	5	6 (Note: Appearances in UEFA Champions League)	1	1 (Note: Appearance in Belgian Super Cup)	0	49	14
Monaco	2024–25	Ligue 1	23	3	1	1	7	2	1 (Note: Appearance in Trophée des Champions)	0	32	6
Monaco	2025–26	Ligue 1	15	2	2	2	3	0	—		20	4
Monaco	Total		38	5	3	3	10	2	1	0	52	10
Career total			102	21	9	8	16	3	2	0	129	32

=== International goals ===
Scores and results list Nigeria's goal tally first.

No.	Date	Venue	Opponent	Score	Result	Competition
1.	25 September 2026	Godswill Akpabio International Stadium, Uyo, Nigeria	Madagascar	1–1	2–1	2027 Africa Cup of Nations qualification

== Honours ==
Royal Antwerp

- Belgian Super Cup: 2023
