= Diriyah Club =

Association football club in Saudi Arabia

Diriyah Club نادي الدرعية
- Full name: Diriyah Club
- Founded: 1976; 50 years ago
- Ground: Al-Awwal Park
- Capacity: 25,000
- Owner: Diriyah Company
- Chairman: Khalid bin Mohammed
- Head coach: Bruno Lage
- League: Saudi Pro League
- 2025–26: FDL, 3rd of 18 (promoted via play-offs)
- Website: www.diriyahclub.sa/en
Home colours

Diriyah Club is a Saudi Arabian professional football based in Diriyah, Riyadh Province, that competes in the Saudi Pro League.

== History ==
Diriyah Football Club was established by Saad Al-Rashed and Abdul Rahman bin Suraie. The club's first president was Abdullah Al-Jadaie.

In July 2021, Dr. Khalid Al-Habshan was elected as club president by the general assembly.

On July 12, 2024, the Ministry of Sport officially transferred ownership of Diriyah Club to Diriyah Company — a firm fully owned by the Public Investment Fund. This move was part of the Kingdom's broader Saudi Vision 2030 initiative to privatize and professionalize sports clubs across the Kingdom. Following the acquisition, a new board of directors was appointed, chaired by Prince Khalid bin Mohammed.

On September 8, 2025, the club announced a new identity, unveiling a redesigned logo and changing its traditional maroon color to a shade called "Diriyah Tan," inspired by the historic mudbrick architecture of the At-Turaif District. As part of the rebranding, the club also dropped the "Al" from its name, changing from Al-Diriyah Club to Diriyah Club. The changes were made to reflect the club's cultural roots and present a more modern image.

== Honours ==
- Saudi First Division League (tier 2)
  - Play-off (1): 2025–26
- Saudi Second Division League (tier 3)
  - Winners (2): 2012–13, 2024–25
  - Runners-up (1): 2019–20
- Saudi Third Division League (tier 4)
  - Runners-up (1): 2006–07

== Current squad ==
As of 22 August 2026:

Note: Flags indicate national team as defined under FIFA eligibility rules; some limited exceptions apply. Players may hold more than one non-FIFA nationality.

No.	Pos.	Nation	Player
2	DF	KSA	Abdulaziz Al-Faraj
4	DF	KSA	Saeed Al-Rubaie
5	MF	SEN	Idrissa Gueye
6	MF	KSA	Sultan Al-Farhan
8	MF	KSA	Ziyad Al-Qahtani
9	FW	FRA	Gaëtan Laborde
10	FW	ALG	Adil Boulbina
11	MF	KSA	Hattan Bahebri
12	DF	KSA	Taher Wadi
14	MF	ESP	Óscar Rodríguez
16	DF	KSA	Hussain Al-Sibyani (on loan from Al-Shabab)
17	MF	SEN	Clayton Diandy
19	DF	ALB	Berat Djimsiti
20	MF	FRA	Enzo Millot (on loan from Al-Ahli)
21	DF	KSA	Mohamed Hameran

No.	Pos.	Nation	Player
22	GK	BIH	Nikola Vasilj
25	FW	CRO	Lovro Chelfi
29	FW	URU	Darwin Núñez (on loan from Al Hilal)
32	MF	KSA	Abdullah Al-Zaid (on loan from Al Hilal)
33	GK	KSA	Waleed Abdullah
34	GK	KSA	Mansour Al-Sibyani
52	MF	KSA	Hussain Al-Qahtani
75	FW	KSA	Meshari Al-Nemer
78	DF	KSA	Khalid Asiri
87	DF	KSA	Qassem Lajami
88	MF	KSA	Abdulelah Al-Malki
97	GK	KSA	Amin Bukhari
99	DF	COD	Chancel Mbemba
—	DF	KSA	Abdulelah Al-Jaafari
—	MF	POR	Mathys De Carvalho

=== Out on loan ===
Note: Flags indicate national team as defined under FIFA eligibility rules; some limited exceptions apply. Players may hold more than one non-FIFA nationality.

No.	Pos.	Nation	Player
7	FW	CMR	Georges-Kévin Nkoudou (at Abha)
27	FW	KSA	Saleh Al-Rahmani (at Al-Jabalain)

No.	Pos.	Nation	Player
82	DF	KSA	Hussain Al-Zarie (at Al-Faisaly)

== Current staff ==
Position	Name
Sporting Director	(Scotland) Dougie Freedman
Head coach	(Portugal) Bruno Lage
Assistant coach	(Portugal) Luís Lage (Portugal) Carlos Cachada (Saudi Arabia) Bandar Al-Kubaishan
Goalkeeper coach	(Saudi Arabia) Abdullah Rashad
Fitness coach	(Portugal) Alexandre Silva (Saudi Arabia) Yasser Masoud
Video analyst	(Saudi Arabia) Jehad Al-Khulaif
Match analyst	(Portugal) Diogo Camacho
Doctor	(Saudi Arabia) Hussain Al-Ghamdi
Physiotherapist	(Netherlands) Marco van der Steen (Saudi Arabia) Abdulaziz Ali
Kit manager	(Saudi Arabia) Naif Qassem

== See also ==
- List of football clubs in Saudi Arabia
