= 2025–26 Al-Kholood Club season =

Al-Kholood
2025–26 season
- President: Mohammed Al-Khalifah (until 23 July)
- Manager: Cosmin Contra (until 23 July)
- Stadium: Al-Hazem Club Stadium
- Pro League: 13th
- King's Cup: Runners-up

The 2025–26 season is Al-Kholood's 56th year in existence and their second consecutive season in the Pro League. The club will participate in the Pro League and the King's Cup.

The season covers the period from 1 July 2025 to 30 June 2026.

== Players ==
=== Squad information ===
As of 9 September 2025

Note: Flags indicate national team as defined under FIFA eligibility rules; some limited exceptions apply. Players may hold more than one non-FIFA nationality.

No.	Pos.	Nation	Player
4	DF	KSA	Jamaan Al-Dossari
5	DF	NGR	William Troost-Ekong
6	MF	ENG	John Buckley
7	DF	KSA	Sultan Al-Shehri
8	MF	KSA	Abdulrahman Al-Safri
9	FW	COM	Myziane Maolida
11	MF	KSA	Hattan Bahebri
12	DF	KSA	Hassan Al-Asmari
13	DF	KSA	Abdullah Masoud
15	DF	KSA	Ramzi Solan
18	FW	ARG	Ramiro Enrique

No.	Pos.	Nation	Player
19	FW	KSA	Majed Khalifah
23	DF	SVK	Norbert Gyömbér
30	GK	KSA	Mohammed Mazyad
31	GK	ARG	Juan Pablo Cozzani (on loan from Platense)
38	DF	SUR	Shaquille Pinas
39	MF	KSA	Abdulrahman Al-Dawsari
46	MF	KSA	Abdulaziz Al-Aliwa
48	GK	KSA	Muhannad Al-Yahya
70	MF	KSA	Muhammad Sawan
96	MF	FRA	Kévin N'Doram
99	FW	BRA	Guga (on loan from Al-Qadsiah)

== Staff ==
Position	Staff
Head coach	(England) Des Buckingham
Assistant coach	(Japan) Hiroshi Miyazawa
Goalkeeper coach	(Spain) Juanma Cruz
Fitness coach	(England) James Redden
Match analyst	(Saudi Arabia) Mohammed Sawaan
Team doctor	(Saudi Arabia) Mazen Al-Shehri
Physiotherapist	(Saudi Arabia) Abdullah Al-Harbi
Masseur	(Saudi Arabia) Sultan Mazyad
Performance Manager	(Saudi Arabia) Mohammed Al-Mazrou

== Transfers and loans ==
=== Transfers in ===
Entry date	Position	No.	Player	From club	Fee	Ref.
30 June 2025	DF	4	(Saudi Arabia) Jamaan Al-Dossari	(Saudi Arabia) Al-Faisaly	End of loan	
30 June 2025	DF	13	(Saudi Arabia) Abdullah Masoud	(Saudi Arabia) Al-Houra	End of loan	
1 July 2025	FW	18	(Democratic Republic of the Congo) Jackson Muleka	(Turkey) Beşiktaş	$1,750,000	
21 August 2025	MF	11	(Saudi Arabia) Hattan Bahebri	(Saudi Arabia) Al-Taawoun	Free	
22 August 2025	MF	39	(Saudi Arabia) Abdulrahman Al-Dawsari	(Saudi Arabia) Al-Qadsiah	Undisclosed	
27 August 2025	DF	15	(Saudi Arabia) Ramzi Solan	(Saudi Arabia) Damac	Free	
27 August 2025	MF	6	(England) John Buckley	(England) Blackburn Rovers	$1,350,000	
27 August 2025	MF	46	(Saudi Arabia) Abdulaziz Al-Aliwa	(Saudi Arabia) Al-Nassr	$134,000	
31 August 2025	DF	38	(Suriname) Shaquille Pinas	(Sweden) Hammarby	Undisclosed	
8 September 2025	FW	18	(Argentina) Ramiro Enrique	(United States) Orlando City	$3,300,000	
9 September 2025	GK	48	(Saudi Arabia) Muhannad Al-Yahya	(Saudi Arabia) Al-Fateh	Free	
11 January 2026	DF	25	(Guinea) Mansour Camara	Unattached	Free	
12 January 2026	FW	27	(Saudi Arabia) Abdullah Al Ajyan	(Saudi Arabia) Al-Okhdood	Free	

=== Loans in ===
Start date	End date	Position	No.	Player	From club	Fee	Ref.
23 August 2025	End of season	FW	99	(Brazil) Guga	(Saudi Arabia) Al-Qadsiah	None	
27 August 2025	End of season	GK	31	(Argentina) Juan Pablo Cozzani	(Argentina) Platense	None	
27 August 2025	End of season	DF	–	(Saudi Arabia) Muhannad Al-Harthi	(Saudi Arabia) Al-Ettifaq	None	
27 August 2025	End of season	DF	–	(Saudi Arabia) Abdullah Al-Zori	(Saudi Arabia) Al-Ettifaq	None	

=== Transfers out ===
Exit date	Position	No.	Player	To club	Fee	Ref.
30 June 2025	DF	27	(Saudi Arabia) Hamdan Al-Shamrani	(Saudi Arabia) Al-Ettifaq	End of loan	
30 June 2025	MF	6	(Nigeria) Ambrose Ochigbo	(Tunisia) ES Zarzis	End of loan	
30 June 2025	MF	10	(Spain) Álex Collado	(Spain) Real Betis	End of loan	
30 June 2025	MF	15	(Mali) Aliou Dieng	(Egypt) Al Ahly Cairo	End of loan	
30 June 2025	MF	22	(Saudi Arabia) Hammam Al-Hammami	(Saudi Arabia) Al-Ittihad	End of loan	
30 June 2025	MF	29	(Saudi Arabia) Farhah Al-Shamrani	(Saudi Arabia) Al-Ittihad	End of loan	
30 June 2025	MF	51	(Saudi Arabia) Zaid Al-Enezi	(Saudi Arabia) Al-Ula	End of loan	
30 June 2025	FW	18	(Democratic Republic of the Congo) Jackson Muleka	(Turkey) Beşiktaş	End of loan	
30 June 2025	FW	20	(Saudi Arabia) Bassem Al-Oraini	(Saudi Arabia) Al-Taawoun	End of loan	
4 August 2025	DF	24	(Saudi Arabia) Abdullah Hawsawi	(Saudi Arabia) Al-Najma	Free	
5 August 2025	DF	70	(Saudi Arabia) Mohammed Jahfali	(Saudi Arabia) Al-Faisaly	Free	
20 August 2025	FW	18	(Democratic Republic of the Congo) Jackson Muleka	(Turkey) Konyaspor	Free	
9 September 2025	GK	34	(Brazil) Marcelo Grohe	(Saudi Arabia) Al-Shabab	Free	
20 September 2025	GK	33	(Saudi Arabia) Jassem Al-Ashban	(Saudi Arabia) Al-Orobah	Free	
20 January 2026	DF	5	(Nigeria) William Troost-Ekong	(Qatar) Al-Ahli Doha	Free	

== Pre-season ==
9 August 2025 Friendly	Al-Kholood (Saudi Arabia)	2–0	(Algeria) JS Kabylie	Turkey
17:00 TRT		Report

12 August 2025 Friendly	Al-Kholood (Saudi Arabia)	3–0	(Turkey) Fethiyespor	Kartepe, Turkey
TRT	Maolida; Khalifa; Bahebri			Stadium: The Green Park Kartepe Resort

22 August 2025 Friendly	Al-Kholood (Saudi Arabia)	2–1	(Saudi Arabia) Al-Taawoun	Buraidah, Saudi Arabia
18:45 AST	Maolida 73' (pen.); Khalifa 89'		Al-Ahmed 47'	Stadium: Al-Taawoun Club Stadium

== Competitions ==
=== Overview ===
Competition	Record							
Competition	Pld	W	D	L	GF	GA	GD	Win %
Pro League	18	5	0	13	25	35	−10	27.78
King's Cup	3	3	0	0	7	4	+3	100.00
Total	21	8	0	13	32	39	−7	38.10

Updated to match played 30 January 2026
Source: Competitions

=== Pro League ===
==== League table ====
Pos	Team	Pld	W	D	L	GF	GA	GD	Pts	Qualification or relegation
12	Al-Khaleej	34	10	7	17	54	62	−8	37	
13	Al-Shabab	34	8	11	15	44	57	−13	35	
14	Al-Kholood	34	9	6	19	39	61	−22	33	
15	Al-Riyadh	34	7	9	18	35	63	−28	30	
16	Damac (R)	34	6	11	17	32	55	−23	29	Relegation to FD League

Source: SPL
Rules for classification: 1) Points; 2) Head-to-head points; 3) Head-to-head goal difference; 4) Total goal difference; 5) Total goals scored; 6) Fair-play points
(Note: Head-to-head record is used only after all the matches between the teams in question have been played).
(R) Relegated

==== Results summary ====
Overall								Home						Away					
Pld	W	D	L	GF	GA	GD	Pts	W	D	L	GF	GA	GD	W	D	L	GF	GA	GD
18	5	0	13	25	35	−10	15	2	0	8	12	22	−10	3	0	5	13	13	0

Last updated: 30 January 2026.
Source: Saudi Pro League

==== Results by round ====
Round	1	2	3	4	5	6	7	8	9	11	12	13	14	15	16	17	18	19	20	21	22	23	10	24	25	26	27	28	29	30	31	32	33	34
Ground	A	A	H	A	H	A	H	A	H	H	H	A	H	A	H	A	H	H	A	H	A	H	A	A	H	A	H	A	A	H	A	H	A	H
Result	L	L	W	W	W	L	L	L	L	L	L	W	L	L	L	W	L	L																
Position	12	17	12	11	7	9	9	10	11	12	13	12	13	13	13	12	13	14																

Updated to match(es) played on 30 January 2026. Source: Saudi Pro League
A = Away; H = Home; W = Win; D = Draw; L = Loss

==== Matches ====
All times are local, AST (UTC+3).

Win Draw Loss Postponed

28 August 2025 1	Al-Ettifaq	2–1	Al-Kholood	Dammam
21:00	Nkota 7'; Madu (yellow card) 13'; Medrán (yellow card) 47'; Wijnaldum 61'; Al-Ghamdi (yellow card) 88'	Report	Buckley 36', (yellow card) 45+2'; Solan (yellow card) 90+6'	Stadium: EGO Stadium; Attendance: 2,168; Referee: Faisal Al-Blwi

14 September 2025 2	Al-Nassr	2–0	Al-Kholood	Riyadh
21:00	Mané 52'; Al-Ghannam (yellow card) 73'; Martinez 81'; Al-Khaibari (yellow card) 90+5'	Report	Buckley (yellow card) 83'; Enrique (yellow card) 90+3'	Stadium: Al-Awwal Park; Attendance: 18,095; Referee: Ricardo de Burgos Bengoetxea (Spain)

18 September 2025 3	Al-Kholood	2–1	Damac	Ar Rass
18:40	Enrique 11'; N'Doram (yellow card) 14'; Buckley 81'	Report	Vada 23' (pen.)	Stadium: Al-Hazem Club Stadium; Attendance: 2,468; Referee: Sultan Al-Harbi

25 September 2025 4	Al-Shabab	1–2	Al-Kholood	Riyadh
18:25	Hernández (yellow card) 14'; Carrasco 61' (pen.)	Report	Bahebri (yellow card) 20'; Enrique 48'; Al-Aliwa 90'	Stadium: SHG Arena; Attendance: 2,377; Referee: Mohammed Al-Hoaish

17 October 2025 5	Al-Kholood	5–1	Al-Najma	Buraidah
18:10	Sawaan 4'; Enrique 24' (pen.); N'Doram (yellow card) 43'; Maolida 45+1'; Bahebri 84'; Al-Aliwa 90'	Report	Jasim 11'; Samir (yellow card) 45+3' (yellow-red card) 67'; Al-Harabi (yellow card) 47'; Al-Tulayhi (yellow card) 56'; Al-Shammari (yellow card) 63'; Al-Najjar (yellow card) 90+2'	Stadium: King Abdullah Sports City; Attendance: 2,759; Referee: Shukri Al-Hanfoush

23 October 2025 6	Al-Riyadh	1–0	Al-Kholood	Riyadh
17:55	Sylla 26'; Al-Khaibari (yellow card) 76'	Report	N'Doram (yellow card) 34'	Stadium: SHG Arena; Attendance: 1,316; Referee: Abdullah Zarban

30 October 2025 7	Al-Kholood	2–3	Neom	Buraidah
20:30	N'Doram 5'; Al-Safri (yellow card) 15'; Maolida (yellow card) 27'; Enrique 82'; Al-Shehri (yellow card) 90+1'	Report	Benrahma 8', 66'; Troost-Ekong 32' (o.g.); Koné (yellow card) 35'; Al-Oyayari (yellow card) 77'; Maximiano (yellow card) 78'	Stadium: King Abdullah Sports City; Attendance: 981; Referee: Abdulsamad Bakri

6 November 2025 8	Al-Qadsiah	4–0	Al-Kholood	Dammam
20:30	Retegui 15' (pen.), 68'; Al-Juwayr 60'; Nández 65'	Report	Sawaan (yellow card) 58'; Enrique (yellow card) 71'	Stadium: Prince Mohamed bin Fahd Stadium; Attendance: 6,765; Referee: Serdar Gözübüyük (Netherlands)

21 November 2025 9	Al-Kholood	1–2	Al-Hazem	Ar Rass
17:50	Enrique 3'; Gyömbér (yellow card) 36'	Report	Mokwana 30'; Al Somah 37' (pen.); Al-Sayyali (yellow card) 43'; Rosier (yellow card) 49'; Al-Dakheel (yellow card) 87'	Stadium: Al-Hazem Club Stadium; Attendance: 3,583; Referee: Khalid Al-Turais

26 December 2025 11	Al-Kholood	0–2	Al-Taawoun	Ar Rass
18:00		Report	Al-Mufarrij (yellow card) 9' (yellow-red card) 90+4'; Zambrano 22'; Troost-Ekong 75' (o.g.)	Stadium: Al-Hazem Club Stadium; Attendance: 1,895; Referee: Abdullah Al-Shehri

31 December 2025 12	Al-Kholood	1–3	Al-Hilal	Buraidah
20:30	Al-Dawsari (red card) 37'; Enrique 45+5' (pen.), (yellow card) 81'; Cozzani (yellow card) 61'	Report	Milinković-Savić 45'; Hernández 61', 84'; César (yellow card) 72'	Stadium: King Abdullah Sports City; Attendance: 9,253; Referee: Donatas Rumšas (Lithuania)

3 January 2026 13	Al-Fayha	0–5	Al-Kholood	Al Majma'ah
17:55	Semedo (red card) 63'; Sakala (yellow card) 82'	Report	Maolida 5', 84'; Smalling 38' (o.g.); Enrique 44'; Bahebri 65', (yellow card) 85'; Al-Safri (yellow card) 82'	Stadium: Al-Majma'ah Sports City Stadium; Attendance: 494; Referee: Mohammed Abu Shaqarah

9 January 2026 14	Al-Kholood	0–4	Al-Ittihad	Buraidah
20:30	Troost-Ekong (red card) 8'	Report	Benzema 13' (pen.), 28', 35'; Al-Shehri 84'	Stadium: King Abdullah Sports City; Attendance: 5,537; Referee: Sultan Al-Harbi

13 January 2026 15	Al-Okhdood	1–0	Al-Kholood	Najran
18:25	Gül (yellow card) 20'; Bassogog 54'; Asiri (yellow card) 77'; Al-Rubaie (yellow card) 85'	Report	Buckley (yellow card) 78'	Stadium: Prince Hathloul bin Abdulaziz Sports City; Attendance: 1,402; Referee: Sami Al-Jurays

17 January 2026 16	Al-Kholood	0–1	Al-Ahli	Buraidah
18:10	Bahebri (yellow card) 45+2'; Cozzani (yellow card) 86'	Report	Toney 74'; Demiral (yellow card) 86'; Millot (yellow card) 90+4'; Al-Sanbi (yellow card) 90+6'	Stadium: King Abdullah Sports City; Attendance: 2,298; Referee: Majed Al-Shamrani

20 January 2026 17	Al-Fateh	2–5	Al-Kholood	Al-Hasa
20:30	Youssouf 45+3'; Buckley 57' (o.g.); Baattiah (yellow card) 60'; Al-Jari (yellow card) 74'	Report	Solan (yellow card) 9'; Enrique 12', 81'; Sawaan 19'; Gyömbér (yellow card) 43'; Bahebri 55'; Al-Dawsari 71'; Al-Safri (yellow card) 90+2'	Stadium: Maydan Tamweel Aloula; Attendance: 7,118; Referee: Khaled Al-Ahmari

24 January 2026 18	Al-Kholood	1–2	Al-Ettifaq	Ar Rass
18:20	Enrique 16'; Sawaan (yellow card) 48'; Pinas (yellow card) 90+5'	Report	Duda (yellow card) 13'; Al-Ghamdi (yellow card) 42'; Ali (yellow card) 45+2'; Al-Ghannam 50', 83'; Al-Khateeb (yellow card) 90+6'	Stadium: Al-Hazem Club Stadium; Attendance: 1,596; Referee: Mohammed Al-Hoaish

30 January 2026 19	Al-Kholood	0–3	Al-Nassr	Buraidah
20:30	Bahebri (yellow card) 45+1', (red card) 72'	Report	Martinez (yellow card) 22'; Ronaldo 47'; Simakan 53'; Coman 87' (pen.)	Stadium: King Abdullah Sports City; Attendance: 11,481; Referee: Abdullah Al-Owaydan

21 December 2025 10	Al-Khaleej	v	Al-Kholood	Dammam
20:30				Stadium: Prince Mohamed bin Fahd Stadium

=== King's Cup ===
All times are local, AST (UTC+3).

22 September 2025 Round of 32	Al-Bukiryah	1–2	Al-Kholood	Al Bukayriyah
18:35	Al-Khalifah 82'; Al-Shuwayyi (yellow card) 84'	Report	Fallatah 28' (o.g.); Enrique 71'; Al-Shehri (yellow card) 90'; Mazyad (yellow card) 90+5'; Pinas (yellow card) 90+8'	Stadium: Al-Bukiryah Club Stadium; Referee: Abdullah Al-Kharboush

27 October 2025 Round of 16	Al-Kholood	1–0 (a.e.t.)	Al-Najma	Buraidah
18:00	Buckley (yellow card) 32'; Enrique 99'; Al-Safri (yellow card) 109'; Cozzani (yellow card) 115'	Report	Al-Abdulrazzaq (yellow card) 45'; Al-Haleel (yellow card) 75'; Quioto (yellow card) 82'; Flores (yellow card) 82'	Stadium: King Abdullah Sports City; Referee: Mohammed Al-Ismail

28 November 2025 Quarter-finals	Al-Kholood	4–3	Al-Khaleej	Ar Rass
17:50	Enrique 3'; Maolida 24'; Bahebri 45+3'; Buckley (yellow card) 61', (goal) 83'	Report	Hamzi 45+1'; Al-Amri 47'; Kourbelis (yellow card) 53'; Pinas 90+2' (o.g.); Fortounis (yellow card) 90+3'	Stadium: Al-Hazem Club Stadium; Attendance: 1,183; Referee: Majed Al-Shamrani

18 March 2026 Semi-finals	Al-Kholood	v	Al-Ittihad	Ar Rass
22:00				Stadium: Al-Hazem Club Stadium

== Statistics ==
=== Appearances ===
Last updated on 30 January 2026.

No.	Pos	Nat	Player	Total		Pro League		King's Cup	
No.	Pos	Nat	Player	Apps	Goals	Apps	Goals	Apps	Goals
Goalkeepers
30	GK	(Saudi Arabia) KSA	Mohammed Mazyad	1	0	0	0	1	0
31	GK	(Argentina) ARG	Juan Pablo Cozzani	20	0	18	0	2	0
48	GK	(Saudi Arabia) KSA	Muhannad Al-Yahya	0	0	0	0	0	0
Defenders
4	DF	(Saudi Arabia) KSA	Jamaan Al-Dossari	1	0	0+1	0	0	0
7	DF	(Saudi Arabia) KSA	Sultan Al-Shehri	18	0	11+4	0	1+2	0
12	DF	(Saudi Arabia) KSA	Hassan Al-Asmari	5	0	1+3	0	0+1	0
13	DF	(Saudi Arabia) KSA	Abdullah Masoud	0	0	0	0	0	0
15	DF	(Saudi Arabia) KSA	Ramzi Solan	10	0	9+1	0	0	0
23	DF	(Slovakia) SVK	Norbert Gyömbér	21	0	18	0	3	0
24	DF	(Saudi Arabia) KSA	Odai Abdulghani	5	0	0+4	0	0+1	0
25	DF	(Guinea) GUI	Mansour Camara	5	0	2+3	0	0	0
38	DF	(Suriname) SUR	Shaquille Pinas	18	0	14+1	0	3	0
Midfielders
6	MF	(England) ENG	John Buckley	19	3	16	2	3	1
8	MF	(Saudi Arabia) KSA	Abdulrahman Al-Safri	16	0	9+4	0	2+1	0
11	MF	(Saudi Arabia) KSA	Hattan Bahebri	21	4	17+1	3	3	1
14	MF	(Saudi Arabia) KSA	Ibrahim Barabaa	1	0	0+1	0	0	0
17	MF	(England) ENG	Adam Berry	1	0	0+1	0	0	0
22	MF	(Saudi Arabia) KSA	Salman Al Mesawa	0	0	0	0	0	0
39	MF	(Saudi Arabia) KSA	Abdulrahman Al-Dawsari	20	1	5+12	1	3	0
46	MF	(Saudi Arabia) KSA	Abdulaziz Al-Aliwa	20	2	11+6	2	1+2	0
70	MF	(Saudi Arabia) KSA	Mohammed Sawaan	21	2	13+5	2	1+2	0
96	MF	(France) FRA	Kévin N'Doram	15	1	12+1	1	2	0
Forwards
9	FW	(Comoros) COM	Myziane Maolida	13	4	11	3	2	1
18	FW	(Argentina) ARG	Ramiro Enrique	20	13	17	10	3	3
19	FW	(Saudi Arabia) KSA	Majed Khalifah	16	0	1+13	0	0+2	0
27	FW	(Saudi Arabia) KSA	Abdullah Al Ajyan	0	0	0	0	0	0
99	FW	(Brazil) BRA	Guga	11	0	0+10	0	0+1	0
Player who made an appearance this season but have left the club
5	DF	(Nigeria) NGR	William Troost-Ekong	16	0	13	0	3	0
33	GK	(Saudi Arabia) KSA	Jassem Al-Ashban	0	0	0	0	0	0

=== Goalscorers ===
Rank	No.	Pos	Nat	Name	Pro League	King Cup	Total
1	18	FW	(Argentina)	Ramiro Enrique	10	3	13
2	9	FW	(Comoros)	Myziane Maolida	3	1	4
2	11	MF	(Saudi Arabia)	Hattan Bahebri	3	1	4
4	6	MF	(England)	John Buckley	2	1	3
5	46	MF	(Saudi Arabia)	Abdulaziz Al-Aliwa	2	0	2
5	70	MF	(Saudi Arabia)	Mohammed Sawaan	2	0	2
6	39	MF	(Saudi Arabia)	Abdulrahman Al-Dawsari	1	0	1
6	96	MF	(France)	Kévin N'Doram	1	0	1
Own goal					1	1	2
Total					25	7	32

Last Updated: 24 January 2026

=== Assists ===
Rank	No.	Pos	Nat	Name	Pro League	King Cup	Total
1	6	MF	(England)	John Buckley	3	0	3
1	9	FW	(Comoros)	Myziane Maolida	3	0	3
1	11	MF	(Saudi Arabia)	Hattan Bahebri	2	1	3
1	46	MF	(Saudi Arabia)	Abdulaziz Al-Aliwa	1	2	3
5	38	DF	(Suriname)	Shaquille Pinas	1	0	1
5	70	MF	(Saudi Arabia)	Mohammed Sawaan	1	0	1
5	96	MF	(France)	Kévin N'Doram	1	0	1
5	99	FW	(Brazil)	Guga	1	0	1
Total					13	3	16

Last Updated: 24 January 2026

=== Clean sheets ===
Rank	No.	Pos	Nat	Name	Pro League	King Cup	Total
1	31	GK	(Argentina)	Juan Pablo Cozzani	1	1	2
Total					1	1	2

Last Updated: 3 January 2026
