= 2025–26 Saudi Pro League =

Saudi Pro League
- Season: 2025–26
- Dates: 28 August 2025 – 21 May 2026
- Country: Saudi Arabia
- Champions: Al-Nassr (11th title)
- Relegated: Damac; Al-Najma; Al-Okhdood
- AFC Champions League Elite: Al-Nassr; Al-Hilal; Al-Qadsiah; Al-Ahli (via ACLE); Al-Ittihad
- AFC Champions League Two: Al-Taawoun
- GFF Gulf Club Champions League: Al-Ettifaq; Neom
- Matches: 306
- Goals: 921 (3.01 per match)
- Top goalscorer: Julián Quiñones (33 goals)
- Best goalkeeper: Yassine Bounou; Édouard Mendy (14 clean sheets each)
- Biggest home win: Al-Hilal 6–0 Al-Kholood (8 April 2026)
- Biggest away win: Al-Okhdood 0–6 Al-Hilal (5 February 2026)
- Highest scoring: Al-Khaleej 4–4 Al-Ittihad (1 November 2025)
- Longest winning run: 16 matches Al-Nassr
- Longest unbeaten run: 34 matches Al-Hilal
- Longest winless run: 20 matches Al-Najma
- Longest losing run: 8 matches Al-Najma
- Highest attendance: 53,883; Al-Ittihad 0–2 Al Nassr (26 September 2025)
- Lowest attendance: 193; Al-Riyadh 1–1 Al-Khaleej (14 February 2026)
- Total attendance: 2,328,726
- Average attendance: 7,736

The 2025–26 Saudi Pro League (known as the Roshn Saudi League for sponsorship reasons) was the 69th season of the top-tier Saudi football league, established in 1957, and the 18th season since it was rebranded as the Saudi Pro League in 2008.

Al-Ittihad were the defending champions, having won their 14th title last season, however they failed to defend the league title this season, losing out to Al-Nassr, who won their 11th league title. Al-Najma and Neom earned automatic promotion to the Pro League, while Al-Hazem earned the last promotion spot through the play-offs. Al-Raed, Al-Orobah, and Al-Wehda were relegated to the 2025–26 Saudi First Division League.

== Teams ==
Locations of teams in the 2025–26 Saudi Pro League

18 teams will compete in the league – the top 15 teams from the previous season and the 3 teams promoted from the FD League.

=== Teams who were promoted to the Pro League ===
On 22 April 2025, Neom became the first team to be promoted following a 3–0 away win against Al-Arabi. They were crowned champions following a 6–0 away win against Jeddah on 29 April 2025. Neom will play in the top flight of Saudi football for the first time in their history and will be the 40th side to participate in the Saudi Pro League since its inception. In addition, they will become the second side to represent the Tabuk Province following Al-Watani's promotion in 2007.

On 12 May 2025, Al-Najma became the second club to be promoted following a 2–0 home win against Ohod. Al-Najma return to the top flight for the first time since getting relegated in the 2002–03 season and will play in their 12th season in the top flight. In addition, this will be their first season in the Pro League era.

On 29 May 2025, Al-Hazem became the third and final club to be promoted after defeating Al-Adalah 3–0 in the promotion play-offs final. This was Al-Hazem's fourth promotion in seven years and will play in their 11th season in the top flight.

=== Teams who were relegated to the FD League ===
Al-Raed were the first team to be relegated following a 1–0 defeat away to Damac on 11 May 2025. Al-Raed were relegated after 17 consecutive seasons in the flight. This was also their first-ever relegation in the Pro League era.

On 25 May 2025, Al-Orobah became the second team to be relegated after they were docked three points for fielding an ineligible player against Al-Nassr. Al-Orobah were relegated after one season in the top flight.

Al-Wehda were the third and final club to be relegated, following a 2–1 away defeat to Al-Ettifaq on the final matchday. Al-Wehda were relegated after three seasons in the top flight. In addition, this was their eighth relegation in history.

=== Stadiums ===
Note: Table lists in alphabetical order.

Team	Location	Stadium	Capacity
Al-Ahli	Jeddah	King Abdullah Sports City Stadium; Al-Faisal Stadium	60,342; 27,000
Al-Ettifaq	Dammam	Stadion EGO	12,984
Al-Fateh	Al-Mubarraz	Maydan Tamweel Aloula	11,851
Al-Fayha	Majmaah	Majmaah Sports City Stadium	6,843
Al-Hazem	Ar Rass	Al-Hazem Club Stadium	5,100
Al-Hilal	Riyadh	Kingdom Arena	26,090
Al-Ittihad	Jeddah	King Abdullah Sports City Stadium; Al-Faisal Stadium	60,342; 27,000
Al-Khaleej	Saihat	Prince Mohamed bin Fahd Stadium (Dammam)	22,042
Al-Kholood	Ar Rass	Al-Hazem Club Stadium	5,100
Al-Najma	Unaizah	King Abdullah Sports City Stadium Buraidah	30,180
Al-Nassr	Riyadh	Al-Awwal Park	26,004
Al-Okhdood	Najran	Prince Hathloul bin Abdulaziz Sports City Stadium	12,000
Al-Qadsiah	Khobar	Prince Mohamed bin Fahd Stadium (Dammam)	22,042
Al-Riyadh	Riyadh	SHG Arena	18,063
Al-Shabab	Riyadh	SHG Arena	13,537
Al-Taawoun	Buraidah	King Abdullah Sports City Stadium Buraidah; Al-Taawoun Stadium	30,180; 5,624
Damac	Khamis Mushait	Damac Club Stadium; Prince Sultan bin Abdulaziz Sports City Stadium (Abha)	3,800; 25,000
Neom	Tabuk	King Khalid Sport City Stadium	12,000

=== Personnel and kits ===
Team	Manager	Captain	Kit manufacturer	Main sponsor	Other sponsors
Al-Ahli	(Germany) Matthias Jaissle	(Senegal) Édouard Mendy	Adidas	Red Sea Global	List: Front: Saudi Investment Recycling Company, Neoleap; Back: Kayanee, Cenomi; Sleeves: None; Shorts: None
Al-Ettifaq	(Saudi Arabia) Saad Al-Shehri	(Netherlands) Georginio Wijnaldum	Castore	Kammelna	List: Front: Aldyar Alarabiya, Tameeni Insurance; Back: Mouwasat Hospital, Xplere, Enterprise Rent-A-Car; Sleeves: Saudi Qaid Transport Company; Shorts: None
Al-Fateh	(Portugal) José Gomes	(Saudi Arabia) Mohammed Al-Fuhaid	Offside	None	List: Front: Fuchsia Bakery, Tameeni Insurance; Back: Tamweel Aloula, Dallah Hospitals; Sleeves: Orinex, Freshly Kitchen; Shorts: None
Al-Fayha	(Portugal) Pedro Emanuel	(Saudi Arabia) Sami Al-Khaibari	HH Sports	Basic Electronics Company	List: Front: Tameeni Insurance; Back: Al Romaih Investment; Sleeves: Morabaha Marina Financing Company; Shorts: None
Al-Hazem	(Tunisia) Jalel Kadri	(Saudi Arabia) Abdulrahman Al-Dakheel	Hattrick	Yelo	
Al-Hilal	(Italy) Simone Inzaghi	(Saudi Arabia) Salem Al-Dawsari	Puma	Savvy Games Group	List: Front: Jahez, Flynas; Back: Riyad Bank, Saudi Entertainment Ventures; Sleeves: Tree Digital Insurance Agency, Sanabil Investments; Shorts: None
Al-Ittihad	(Portugal) Sérgio Conceição	(France) Karim Benzema	Nike	Roshn	List: Front: SURJ Sports Investment, Volkswagen, Flow Progressive Logistics; Back: Milaf Al Madinah Heritage; Sleeves: None; Shorts: None
Al-Khaleej	(Uruguay) Gus Poyet	(Portugal) Fábio Martins	Laser	Yelo Rent a Car	List: Front: Fisher Electronics, Tameeni Insurance, Almana Hospital; Back: Shemagh Al Bassam, Florina Shoes, Candy; Sleeves: Locate Food Delivery App, Saudi Qaid Transport Company; Shorts: Sayyar
Al-Kholood	(England) Des Buckingham	(Nigeria) William Troost-Ekong	Kappa	Yelo Rent a Car	List: Front: Tameeni Insurance; Back: Mezaj Maghribhi, Florina Shoes, Elba Cookers; Sleeves: Saudi Qaid Transport Company; Shorts: None
Al-Najma	(Serbia) Nestor El Maestro	(Saudi Arabia) Ziyad Al-Qahtani	Puma	Yelo	List: Front: Shahad, Wooden Coffee; Back: Sunchine Cars Showroom, Ramz Tea; Sleeves: Al Qassim National Hospital; Shorts: Raz Amwal
Al-Nassr	(Portugal) Jorge Jesus	(Portugal) Cristiano Ronaldo	Adidas	KAFD	List: Front: Syndicate Holding Group, AROYA Cruises, Gathern; Back: None; Sleeves: Noug, DAZN; Shorts: None
Al-Okhdood	(Tunisia) Fathi Al-Jabal	(Saudi Arabia) Hussain Al-Zabdani	Skillano	Yelo Rent a Car	List: Front: Tameeni Insurance; Back: Mezaj Maghribhi; Sleeves: Saudi Qaid Transport Company; Shorts: None
Al-Qadsiah	(Northern Ireland) Brendan Rodgers	(Spain) Nacho	Nike	Aloula Aviation	List: Front: Almajdouie Genesis, BesteBit, Valvoline by Aramco; Back: iz, Zoho Corporation, Sixt; Sleeves: Saudi Geophysical; Shorts: Batook Nova
Al-Riyadh	(Brazil) Maurício Dulac	(Canada) Milan Borjan	Black Panther	Science Technology	List: Front: Tameeni Insurance; Back: Stars Smile; Sleeves: None; Shorts: None
Al-Shabab	(Algeria) Noureddine Zekri	(Belgium) Yannick Carrasco	Offside	Jetour	List: Front: Theeb Rent A Car, Tameeni Insurance; Back: Mezaj Maghribi; Sleeves: Direct for Travel & Tourism; Shorts: None
Al-Taawoun	(Brazil) Péricles Chamusca	(Netherlands) Aschraf El Mahdioui	Macron	Aldyar Alarabiya	List: Front: Gree Electric, Dr Tooth Clinics; Back: Al Dahayan Aluminum Panel Factory, Al Saif Trading Agencies; Sleeves: Direct KSA, Duvet Mattresses; Shorts: None
Damac	(Brazil) Fábio Carille	(Algeria) Farouk Chafaï	Skillano	Basic Electronics Company	List: Front: Osoul Poultry, Tameeni Insurance; Back: Tadawi Clinic; Sleeves: Saudi Qaid Transport Company, Lateen Water; Shorts: None
Neom	(France) Christophe Galtier	(Saudi Arabia) Salman Al-Faraj	Puma	Oxagon	List: Front: SHG; Back: None; Sleeves: None; Shorts: None

=== Managerial changes ===
Team	Outgoing manager	Manner of departure	Date of vacancy	Position in table	Incoming manager	Date of appointment
Al-Hilal	(Saudi Arabia) Mohammad Al-Shalhoub (caretaker)	End of caretaker period	1 June 2025	Pre-season	(Italy) Simone Inzaghi	4 June 2025
Al-Riyadh	(Saudi Arabia) Bandar Al-Kubaishan (caretaker)	End of caretaker period	1 June 2025	Pre-season	(Spain) Javier Calleja	5 July 2025
Al-Taawoun	(Saudi Arabia) Mohammed Al-Abdali (caretaker)	End of caretaker period	1 June 2025	Pre-season	(Brazil) Péricles Chamusca	18 July 2025
Al-Kholood	(Algeria) Noureddine Zekri	End of contract	1 June 2025	Pre-season	(Romania) Cosmin Contra	2 July 2025
Al-Shabab	(Turkey) Fatih Terim	End of contract	1 June 2025	Pre-season	(Spain) Imanol Alguacil	3 July 2025
Damac	(Saudi Arabia) Khaled Al-Atwi	End of contract	1 June 2025	Pre-season	(Portugal) Armando Evangelista	24 June 2025
Al-Nassr	(Italy) Stefano Pioli	Mutual consent	25 June 2025	Pre-season	(Portugal) Jorge Jesus	14 July 2025
Neom	(Brazil) Péricles Chamusca	Mutual consent	3 July 2025	Pre-season	(France) Christophe Galtier	5 July 2025
Al-Kholood	(Romania) Cosmin Contra	Mutual consent	23 July 2025	Pre-season	(England) Des Buckingham	14 August 2025
Al-Ittihad	(France) Laurent Blanc	Sacked	28 September 2025	3rd	(Saudi Arabia) Hassan Khalifa (caretaker)	28 September 2025
Al-Ittihad	(Saudi Arabia) Hassan Khalifa (caretaker)	End of caretaker period	7 October 2025	3rd	(Portugal) Sérgio Conceição	7 October 2025
Al-Riyadh	(Spain) Javier Calleja	Sacked	10 November 2025	14th	(Uruguay) José Daniel Carreño	14 November 2025
Al-Qadsiah	(Spain) Míchel	Sacked	14 December 2025	5th	(Northern Ireland) Brendan Rodgers	16 December 2025
Al-Okhdood	(Portugal) Paulo Sérgio	Sacked	5 January 2026	17th	(Romania) Marius Șumudică	5 January 2026
Al-Najma	(Portugal) Mário Silva	Sacked	8 February 2026	18th	(Serbia) Nestor El Maestro	8 February 2026
Damac	(Portugal) Armando Evangelista	Sacked	10 February 2026	15th	(Brazil) Fábio Carille	10 February 2026
Al-Riyadh	(Uruguay) José Daniel Carreño	Sacked	10 February 2026	16th	(Brazil) Maurício Dulac	11 February 2026
Al-Shabab	(Spain) Imanol Alguacil	Sacked	17 February 2026	14th	(Algeria) Noureddine Zekri	18 February 2026
Al-Okhdood	(Romania) Marius Șumudică	Sacked	18 March 2026	17th	(Tunisia) Fathi Al-Jabal	28 March 2026
Al-Khaleej	(Greece) Georgios Donis	Signed by Saudi Arabia	22 April 2026	11th	(Uruguay) Gus Poyet	23 April 2026

== League table ==
Pos	Team	Pld	W	D	L	GF	GA	GD	Pts	Qualification or relegation
1	Al-Nassr (C)	34	28	2	4	91	28	+63	86	Qualification for AFC Champions League Elite league stage (Note: Al-Ahli also qualified as 2025–26 AFC Champions League Elite winners.)
2	Al-Hilal	34	25	9	0	85	27	+58	84	Qualification for AFC Champions League Elite league stage
3	Al-Ahli	34	25	6	3	71	25	+46	81	Qualification for AFC Champions League Elite league stage
4	Al-Qadsiah	34	23	8	3	83	34	+49	77	Qualification for AFC Champions League Elite league stage
5	Al-Ittihad	34	16	7	11	55	48	+7	55	Qualification for AFC Champions League Elite preliminary stage
6	Al-Taawoun	34	15	8	11	59	46	+13	53	Qualification for AFC Champions League Two group stage (Note: Since the winners of the 2025–26 King's Cup, Al-Hilal, had already qualified for the Champions League Elite, the spot given to the King's Cup winners (Champions League Two) was passed to the sixth-placed team.)
7	Al-Ettifaq	34	14	8	12	51	55	−4	50	Qualification for GFF Gulf Club Champions League group stage
8	Neom	34	12	9	13	43	48	−5	45	Qualification for GFF Gulf Club Champions League group stage
9	Al-Hazem	34	11	9	14	38	57	−19	42	
10	Al-Fayha	34	10	8	16	41	54	−13	38	
11	Al-Fateh	34	9	10	15	41	55	−14	37	
12	Al-Khaleej	34	10	7	17	54	62	−8	37	
13	Al-Shabab	34	8	11	15	44	57	−13	35	
14	Al-Kholood	34	9	6	19	39	61	−22	33	
15	Al-Riyadh	34	7	9	18	35	63	−28	30	
16	Damac (R)	34	6	11	17	32	55	−23	29	Relegation to FD League
17	Al-Okhdood (R)	34	5	5	24	27	70	−43	20	Relegation to FD League
18	Al-Najma (R)	34	3	7	24	32	76	−44	16	Relegation to FD League

Source: SPL
Rules for classification: 1) Points; 2) Head-to-head points; 3) Head-to-head goal difference; 4) Total goal difference; 5) Total goals scored; 6) Fair-play points
(Note: Head-to-head record is used only after all the matches between the teams in question have been played).
(C) Champions; (R) Relegated

=== Positions by round ===
The following table lists the positions of teams after each week of matches. In order to preserve the chronological evolution, any postponed matches are not included in the round at which they were originally scheduled but added to the full round they were played immediately afterward.

Team ╲ Round	1	2	3	4	5	6	7	8	9	10	11	12	13	14	15	16	17	18	19	20	21	22	23	24	25	26	27	28	29	30	31	32	33	34
Al-Ahli	8	7	8	7	8	5	5	5	4	4	4	4	4	4	4	3	3	3	3	3	3	3	2	2	2	3	3	3	3	3	3	3	3	3
Al-Ettifaq	6	6	9	8	11	11	11	11	9	8	8	8	7	8	7	7	6	7	7	6	7	7	7	7	7	7	7	7	7	7	7	7	7	7
Al-Fateh	11	15	16	16	15	15	15	15	17	14	11	10	10	10	9	10	10	10	10	10	10	11	10	9	11	13	13	14	13	13	12	12	12	11
Al-Fayha	7	10	10	9	10	10	10	9	10	10	12	13	11	12	12	13	12	11	12	11	12	10	11	12	10	9	9	10	10	10	9	10	10	10
Al-Hazem	9	14	14	14	12	14	13	14	12	11	10	11	12	11	11	11	11	12	11	12	11	12	13	10	12	10	11	9	9	9	10	9	9	9
Al-Hilal	5	5	7	6	4	3	3	3	2	2	2	1	1	1	1	1	1	1	1	1	1	2	3	3	3	2	2	2	2	2	2	2	2	2
Al-Ittihad	2	3	2	3	5	7	8	8	7	6	6	6	6	6	6	6	6	6	6	7	6	6	6	5	6	6	6	6	6	6	6	5	5	5
Al-Khaleej	3	2	4	10	6	6	7	6	6	9	9	9	9	8	8	8	8	8	8	9	9	9	9	11	9	11	10	11	11	11	11	11	11	12
Al-Kholood	12	17	12	11	7	9	9	10	11	12	13	12	13	13	13	12	13	14	14	13	13	14	14	13	14	14	14	13	14	14	14	13	14	14
Al-Najma	14	16	17	17	18	18	18	18	18	18	18	18	18	18	18	18	18	18	18	18	18	18	18	18	18	18	18	18	18	18	18	18	18	18
Al-Nassr	1	1	1	1	1	1	1	1	1	1	1	2	2	2	2	2	2	2	2	2	2	1	1	1	1	1	1	1	1	1	1	1	1	1
Al-Okhdood	16	18	18	18	17	17	16	16	15	17	17	17	17	17	17	17	17	17	17	17	17	17	17	17	17	17	17	17	17	17	17	17	17	17
Al-Qadsiah	4	4	3	2	2	4	4	4	5	5	5	5	5	5	5	4	4	4	4	4	4	4	4	4	4	4	4	4	4	4	4	4	4	4
Al-Riyadh	15	9	13	13	14	13	12	12	14	15	16	16	15	16	16	16	16	15	16	16	16	15	15	15	16	16	16	16	16	16	16	16	16	15
Al-Shabab	17	11	11	12	13	12	14	13	13	13	15	15	16	14	14	14	14	13	13	14	14	13	12	14	13	12	12	12	12	12	13	14	13	13
Al-Taawoun	18	12	6	5	3	2	2	2	3	3	3	3	3	3	3	5	5	5	5	5	5	5	5	5	5	5	5	5	5	5	5	6	6	6
Damac	10	13	15	15	16	16	17	17	16	16	14	14	14	15	15	15	15	16	15	15	15	16	16	16	15	15	15	15	15	15	15	15	15	16
Neom	13	8	5	4	9	8	6	7	8	7	7	7	8	9	10	9	9	9	9	8	8	8	8	8	8	8	8	8	8	8	8	8	8	8

Leader and AFC Champions League Elite league stage
AFC Champions League Elite league stage
AGCFF Gulf Club Champions League group stage
Relegation to FD League

Source: spl.com.sa

== Results ==
Home \ Away	AHL	ETT	FAT	FAY	HAZ	HIL	ITT	KHJ	KHO	NAJ	NSR	OKH	QAD	RIY	SHB	TWN	DAM	NEO
Al-Ahli		4–0	3–1	2–0	2–0	3–3	3–1	4–1	3–0	4–0	3–2	4–0	2–1	1–1	1–1	2–1	3–0	1–0
Al-Ettifaq	0–0		4–3	3–2	2–2	0–5	1–3	1–2	2–1	0–0	2–2	2–0	3–2	2–3	1–1	1–0	2–0	0–0
Al-Fateh	2–1	2–1		1–2	1–1	0–1	2–2	1–0	2–5	2–0	0–2	2–1	0–1	3–1	2–0	2–5	1–1	2–2
Al-Fayha	1–1	1–0	2–0		0–0	0–1	1–1	3–1	0–5	3–0	1–3	2–0	1–2	4–2	0–0	1–2	1–1	1–1
Al-Hazem	0–2	3–1	0–0	2–0		0–3	1–1	1–4	2–1	3–2	0–2	2–1	1–5	2–1	0–4	2–0	2–1	1–2
Al-Hilal	0–0	2–0	2–1	4–1	3–0		1–1	3–2	6–0	4–0	3–1	3–1	2–2	2–0	1–0	2–2	1–0	2–0
Al-Ittihad	0–1	0–1	4–2	2–1	1–0	0–2		1–0	0–0	1–0	0–2	2–1	1–5	2–1	2–0	1–0	2–1	3–4
Al-Khaleej	1–4	0–5	0–1	3–0	2–1	1–2	4–4		2–3	3–1	0–5	4–1	0–1	4–1	0–0	0–1	4–0	0–1
Al-Kholood	0–1	1–2	0–0	1–1	1–2	1–3	0–4	2–2		5–1	0–3	0–0	1–4	0–2	1–0	0–2	2–1	2–3
Al-Najmah	0–1	3–4	1–1	1–2	2–2	2–4	0–1	2–2	2–1		0–5	1–3	1–3	1–1	1–0	1–2	1–3	2–1
Al-Nassr	2–0	1–0	5–1	2–1	4–0	1–1	2–0	4–1	2–0	5–2		3–0	1–2	5–1	3–2	1–0	4–1	1–0
Al-Okhdood	0–1	1–3	1–0	0–5	1–2	0–6	2–5	3–1	1–0	2–1	0–2		2–4	2–2	1–1	2–3	0–1	1–1
Al-Qadsiah	3–2	4–0	1–1	5–0	2–0	2–2	2–1	2–1	4–0	3–1	3–1	0–0		4–0	2–2	1–1	1–1	1–0
Al-Riyadh	0–1	0–2	1–0	1–1	1–2	1–1	3–1	1–1	1–0	2–1	0–1	1–0	0–4		1–1	1–3	1–1	2–3
Al-Shabab	2–5	1–1	1–1	1–0	1–0	3–5	3–2	1–4	1–2	0–0	2–4	2–0	2–3	3–1		1–5	1–1	3–2
Al-Taawoun	1–2	4–1	3–2	2–3	2–2	1–1	0–2	1–1	1–2	1–0	0–5	1–0	2–0	1–1	2–0		6–1	1–1
Damac	0–1	1–3	1–1	3–0	1–1	0–2	1–1	0–2	0–0	0–0	1–2	2–0	1–1	3–0	1–3	2–1		1–2
Neom	0–3	1–1	0–1	1–0	1–1	1–2	1–3	1–1	1–2	2–1	1–3	1–0	1–3	1–0	2–1	2–2	3–0	

Source: spl.com.sa
Legend: Blue = home team win; Yellow = draw; Red = away team win.
For upcoming matches, an "a" indicates there is an article about the rivalry between the two participants.

== Season statistics ==
=== Top scorers ===
Rank	Player	Club	Goals
1	(Mexico) Julián Quiñones	Al-Qadsiah	33
2	(England) Ivan Toney	Al-Ahli	32
3	(Portugal) Cristiano Ronaldo	Al-Nassr	28
4	(Colombia) Roger Martínez	Al-Taawoun	23
5	(Portugal) João Félix	Al-Nassr	20
5	(Norway) Joshua King	Al-Khaleej	20
7	(Belgium) Yannick Carrasco	Al-Shabab	18
8	(France) Karim Benzema	Al-Ittihad / Al-Hilal	17
9	(Italy) Mateo Retegui	Al-Qadsiah	16
9	(Netherlands) Georginio Wijnaldum	Al-Ettifaq	16

==== Hat-tricks ====
Player	For	Against	Result	Date	Ref.
(Portugal) João Felix	Al-Nassr	Al-Taawoun	5–0 (A)	29 August 2025	
(France) Karim Benzema	Al-Ittihad	Al-Okhdood	5–2 (A)	30 August 2025	
(Portugal) João Felix	Al-Nassr	Al-Fateh	5–1 (H)	18 October 2025	
(Norway) Joshua King	Al-Khaleej	Al-Riyadh	4–1 (H)	19 October 2025	
(Mexico) Julián Quiñones	Al-Qadsiah	Neom	3–1 (A)	19 October 2025	
(Colombia) Roger Martínez	Al-Taawoun	Al-Fateh	5–2 (A)	6 November 2025	
(France) Karim Benzema	Al-Ittihad	Al-Kholood	4–0 (A)	9 January 2026	
(Mexico) Julián Quiñones	Al-Qadsiah	Al-Fayha	5–0 (H)	14 January 2026	
(Colombia) Roger Martínez	Al-Taawoun	Al-Riyadh	3–1 (A)	18 January 2026	
(England) Ivan Toney	Al-Ahli	Al-Khaleej	4–1 (H)	20 January 2026	
(England) Ivan Toney	Al-Ahli	Al-Ettifaq	4–0 (H)	28 January 2026	
(Brazil) Carlos	Al-Shabab	Al-Hazem	4–0 (A)	29 January 2026	
(France) Karim Benzema	Al-Hilal	Al-Okhdood	6–0 (A)	5 February 2026	
(England) Ivan Toney	Al-Ahli	Al-Najma	4–1 (H)	19 February 2026	
(Mexico) Julián Quiñones	Al-Qadsiah	Al-Okhdood	4–2 (A)	20 February 2026	
(France) Karim Benzema	Al-Hilal	Al-Kholood	6–0 (H)	8 April 2026	
(England) Ivan Toney	Al-Ahli	Al-Fateh	3–1 (H)	6 May 2026	
(Portugal) João Felix	Al-Nassr	Al-Shabab	4–2 (A)	7 May 2026	
(Mexico) Julián Quiñones	Al-Qadsiah	Al-Ittihad	5–1 (A)	21 May 2026	

=== Clean sheets ===
Rank	Player	Club	Clean sheets
1	(Senegal) Édouard Mendy	Al-Ahli	14
1	(Morocco) Yassine Bounou	Al-Hilal	14
2	(Brazil) Bento	Al-Nassr	13
4	(Belgium) Koen Casteels	Al-Qadsiah	9
4	(Slovakia) Marek Rodák	Al-Ettifaq	9
6	(Serbia) Predrag Rajković	Al-Ittihad	8
7	(Panama) Orlando Mosquera	Al-Fayha	7
7	(Brazil) Marcelo Grohe	Al-Shabab	7
9	(Brazil) Mailson	Al-Taawoun	6
9	(Portugal) Luís Maximiano	Neom	6
9	(Brazil) Kewin	Damac	6

=== Discipline ===
==== Player ====
- Most yellow cards: 12
  - (Saudi Arabia) Abdulrahman Al-Dakheel (Al-Hazem)
- Most red cards: 2
  - (Saudi Arabia) Ali Majrashi (Al-Ahli)
  - (Brazil) Roger Ibañez (Al-Ahli)
  - (Saudi Arabia) Ziyad Al-Johani (Al-Ahli)
  - (Brazil) Fabinho (Al-Ittihad)
  - (France) Moussa Diaby (Al-Ittihad)
  - (Serbia) Predrag Rajković (Al-Ittihad)
  - (Greece) Dimitrios Kourbelis (Al-Khaleej)
  - (Saudi Arabia) Naif Asiri (Al-Okhdood)
  - (Saudi Arabia) Mohammed Al-Shwirekh (Al-Shabab)
  - (Saudi Arabia) Muteb Al-Mufarrij (Al-Taawoun)
  - (Algeria) Abdelkader Bedrane (Damac)
  - (Saudi Arabia) Khalifah Al-Dawsari (Neom)

==== Club ====
- Most yellow cards: 88
  - Al-Hazem
- Fewest yellow cards: 48
  - Al-Hilal
- Most red cards: 8
  - Al-Okhdood
  - Al-Shabab
- Fewest red cards: 2
  - Al-Fayha
  - Al-Hazem
  - Al-Hilal
  - Al-Nassr
  - Al-Qadsiah
  - Al-Taawoun

== Awards ==
=== Monthly awards ===
Month	Manager of the Month		Player of the Month		Goalkeeper of the Month		Young of the Month		Reference
Month	Manager	Club	Player	Club	Player	Club	Player	Club	Reference
September	(Portugal) Jorge Jesus	Al-Nassr	(Portugal) João Félix	Al-Nassr	(Senegal) Édouard Mendy	Al-Ahli	(Saudi Arabia) Abbas Al-Hassan	Neom	
October	(Italy) Simone Inzaghi	Al-Hilal	(Greece) Kostas Fortounis	Al-Khaleej	(Morocco) Yassine Bounou	Al-Hilal	(Saudi Arabia) Abdulaziz Al-Aliwa	Al-Kholood	
December	(Italy) Simone Inzaghi	Al-Hilal	(Netherlands) Georginio Wijnaldum	Al-Ettifaq	(Brazil) Kewin	Damac	(Saudi Arabia) Abdulaziz Al-Aliwa	Al-Kholood	
January	(Germany) Matthias Jaissle	Al-Ahli	(England) Ivan Toney	Al-Ahli	(Belgium) Koen Casteels	Al-Qadsiah	(Saudi Arabia) Hammam Al-Hammami	Al-Shabab	
February	(Portugal) Jorge Jesus	Al-Nassr	(Belgium) Yannick Carrasco	Al-Shabab	(Brazil) Bento	Al-Nassr	(Saudi Arabia) Abdulaziz Al-Aliwa	Al-Kholood	
April	(Portugal) Jorge Jesus	Al-Nassr	(Argentina) Valentín Vada	Damac	(Brazil) Bento	Al-Nassr	(Saudi Arabia) Abdulaziz Al-Aliwa	Al-Kholood	
May	(Northern Ireland) Brendan Rodgers	Al-Qadsiah	(Portugal) João Félix	Al-Nassr	(Morocco) Yassine Bounou	Al-Hilal	(Saudi Arabia) Sabri Dahal	Al-Fayha	

=== Annual awards ===
Award	Winner	Club	Ref.
Player of the Season	(Portugal) João Félix	Al-Nassr	
Saudi Player of the Season	(Saudi Arabia) Musab Al-Juwayr	Al-Qadsiah	
Young Player of the Season	(Saudi Arabia) Abdulaziz Al-Aliwa	Al-Kholood	
Golden Boot	(Mexico) Julián Quiñones	Al-Qadsiah	
Golden Glove	(Senegal) Édouard Mendy	Al-Ahli	
Manager of the Season	(Portugal) Jorge Jesus	Al-Nassr	
Goal of the Season	(Portugal) Cristiano Ronaldo	Al-Nassr	

Team of the Season
Goalkeeper	(Slovakia) Marek Rodák (Al-Ettifaq)			
Defenders	(Portugal) Danilo Pereira (Al-Ittihad)		(Saudi Arabia) Mohammed Abu Al-Shamat (Al-Qadsiah)	(France) Théo Hernandez (Al-Hilal)
Midfielders	(Portugal) Rúben Neves (Al-Hilal)	(Belgium) Yannick Carrasco (Al-Shabab)	(Mexico) Julián Quiñones (Al-Qadsiah)	(Portugal) João Félix (Al-Nassr)
Forwards	(Colombia) Roger Martínez (Al-Taawoun)		(Portugal) Cristiano Ronaldo (Al-Nassr)	(England) Ivan Toney (Al-Ahli)

== Attendances ==
Saudi Pro League clubs listed by average home league attendance:

Pos	Club	Average attendance
1	Al-Ahli SFC	23,388
2	Al-Nassr	20,707
3	Al-Ittihad	18,553
4	Al-Hilal	17,523
5	Al-Qadsiah	8,976
6	Al-Fateh	8,247
7	Al-Khaleej	5,294
8	Al-Taawoun	4,560
9	Al-Ettifaq	4,445
10	Damac FC	4,181
11	Al-Shabab	4,050
12	Al-Kholood	3,194
13	NEOM SC	3,134
14	Al-Okhdood	2,716
15	Al-Najma	2,679
16	Al-Hazem	2,579
17	Al-Riyadh	1,942
18	Al-Fayha	1,521

== See also ==
- 2025–26 King's Cup
- 2025–26 Saudi Third Division
- 2025–26 Saudi First Division League
- 2025–26 Saudi Second Division League
