= Des Buckingham =

English association football manager (born 1985)

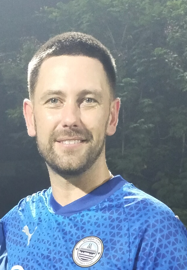
- Buckingham with Mumbai City FC in 2023

Personal information
- Date of birth: 7 February 1985 (age 41)
- Place of birth: Oxford, England
- Position: Goalkeeper

Team information
- Current team: Al-Kholood (head coach)

Youth career
- Years: Team
- 2000–2002: Reading
- 2002–2004: Oxford United

Managerial career
- 2016–2017: Wellington Phoenix
- 2018–2020: New Zealand U20
- 2019–2020: New Zealand U23
- 2020–2021: Melbourne City (caretaker)
- 2021–2023: Mumbai City
- 2023–2024: Oxford United
- 2025–2027: Al-Kholood
- 2027-: New Zealand

Des Buckingham (born 7 February 1985) is an English professional football manager who is the head coach of Saudi Pro League club Al-Kholood. He will become the head coach for New Zealand on 1 July 2027.

Buckingham became the youngest head coach in the history of the A-League during the 2016–17 A-League season. He later led New Zealand's under-20 side to the round of 16 at the 2019 FIFA U-20 World Cup, and qualified the under-23 side for the 2020 Summer Olympics. As head coach of Mumbai City, he won the 2022–23 Indian Super League Winners' Shield, before leading his hometown club Oxford United to promotion to the Championship in 2024. In the 2025–26 season, he guided Al-Kholood to their first-ever King's Cup final.

== Playing career ==
Born in Oxford, England, Buckingham had spells in the youth and reserve teams of English sides Reading and Oxford United. He initially began coaching in his teenage years with the Oxford junior sides, and later additionally joined Oxford & Cherwell Valley College in a full-time coaching and teaching role over a four-year period.

== Coaching career ==
=== Oxford United ===
Buckingham began his professional coaching career at Oxford United at the age of 18, initially working through the club's age-group squads.

=== Wellington Phoenix ===
After stints as a grassroots development manager at WaiBOP United and the Wellington region member federation of New Zealand Football, Buckingham joined the Wellington Phoenix during the 2014–15 A-League season under head coach Ernie Merrick. His initial role was goalkeeping coach. Before the start of the 2016–17 season he was made assistant coach. Merrick resigned from the club in early December 2016 at which point Buckingham was made the interim head coach. In early 2017, after four games as interim coach, he was appointed as manager until the end of the season. At 31 years of age, he became the youngest manager in A-League history and was able to lift the club off the bottom of the table, finishing one place outside the playoffs at the end of the season. Buckingham had earned his Pro Licence in 2016.

=== Stoke City ===
In July, 2017 Buckingham was granted permission to leave Wellington Phoenix and take up a role at Stoke City, then in the Premier League, as an assistant coach with their under-23 team.

=== New Zealand Football ===
A return to New Zealand in 2018 saw Buckingham appointed as head coach of the New Zealand U20 team and assistant manager of the senior national team.

==== New Zealand U20 ====
In August, 2018 Buckingham led the team to the 2018 OFC U-19 Championship, qualifying for the 2019 FIFA U-20 World Cup. At the World Cup, Buckingham's New Zealand side recorded their highest ever finish at a men's FIFA tournament, eventually being knocked out by Colombia in the round of 16 after a controversial penalty shoot-out. The team also posted New Zealand's biggest ever win at a FIFA tournament, a 5–0 win over Honduras, becoming the first New Zealand team to win back-to-back games at a FIFA event; the team also recorded their first ever win over European opposition with a 2–0 win over Norway. Buckingham earned plaudits for the team's quality of football and style of play. Former All Whites Ricki Herbert and Wynton Rufer praised the positive and attacking approach to winning games rarely seen before in New Zealand.

==== New Zealand U23 ====
Despite being linked to clubs in the English Football League and A-League, Buckingham accepted the New Zealand U23 managerial position in June 2019, leading the side into the 2019 Pacific Games and OFC Olympic Qualifying Tournament. Buckingham guided New Zealand to its first-ever gold medal at the 2019 Pacific Games, leading an U-23 side through an otherwise senior international competition undefeated.

On 5 October 2019, Buckingham led New Zealand to its third Olympic Games, qualifying for Tokyo 2020 by winning the OFC U-23 Championship. In doing so, the team became the most dominant men's side to have played in an Oceania Football Confederation competition by winning all five games and finishing with a goal difference of +29. The New Zealand U23 side remained unbeaten during his tenure, winning nine and drawing three of 12 games.

New Zealand Football announced that Buckingham would leave his role as coach of the under-23 side in April 2020, despite a large group of players writing to the governing body to request his retention as coach. Buckingham's contract was not extended following delays caused by the COVID-19 pandemic and the postponement of the 2020 Summer Olympics and he was replaced by Danny Hay.

Buckingham was named Men's Coach of the year at New Zealand Football Awards 2020.

=== Melbourne City ===
In September 2020, Buckingham joined A-League club Melbourne City as Assistant Coach after being identified by the City Football Group. He managed the team on multiple occasions in the absence of Patrick Kisnorbo, when was injured or ill. In his first season, Melbourne City claimed their maiden A-League trophy in the team's eleven-year history, winning the league to secure the A-League Premiers Plate. The team completed the double a month later, winning their first A-League Grand Final.

=== Mumbai City ===
==== 2021–22 season ====
On 8 October 2021, Buckingham was appointed as the head coach of Indian Super League club Mumbai City of the City Football Group on a two-year contract. Under his management, the club began its 2021–22 season campaign with a 3–0 win on 22 November against Goa. In Buckingham's first season in charge, Mumbai City finished the season in fifth place, amassing 31 points from 20 games.

On 11 April 2022, Buckingham led City to their first win at the AFC Champions League, becoming the first Indian team to win a game in the competition, beating Iraqi Premier League champions Al-Quwa Al-Jawiya 2–1 at the King Fahd International Stadium in Saudi Arabia. Buckingham's side became the most successful Indian Club to compete in the AFC Champions League, finishing second in Group B, with results against Al-Jazira and Al-Quwa Al-Jawiya adding to their second-round win. Mumbai City and Buckingham won praise for their fearless approach and positive playing style at the tournament.

==== 2022–23 season ====
On 18 August 2022, under Buckingham, Mumbai City made their Durand Cup debut with a 4–1 win over Indian Navy. The team progressed to the knockout stages, finishing top of their five-team group that included Indian Super League clubs ATK Mohun Bagan and East Bengal. Mumbai City advanced through the quarter-final stage, beating Chennaiyin before securing a win over Mohammedan in the semi-finals to make their first ever Durand Cup Final. Mumbai City finished as runners-up in the tournament after a 2–1 loss to Bengaluru in the final on 18 September 2022.

Mumbai City won the Indian Super League (ISL) on 11 February 2023 after an 18-match unbeaten streak, the longest in ISL history. Buckingham's side broke fifteen records while securing the title, including the most points and goals scored in a single season, while also having the best goal difference, most league wins and longest winning streak in the history of the competition.

On 4 April 2023, Buckingham's team sealed a place in the 2023 AFC Champions League group stage after defeating Jamshedpur 3–1 in a play-off final, the first Indian Club to secure consecutive qualification to the pinnacle of Asian club football.

In May 2023, Buckingham was voted Coach of the Year by the Indian Players Football Association.

==== 2023–24 season ====
Buckingham began the 23–24 season with the 2023 Durand Cup, where Mumbai were drawn in a group with Jamshedpur FC, Mohammedan SC, and the Indian Navy football team. Mumbai won all three games of the group stage with a +11 goal difference, but ended up losing in the quarter-final to eventual winners Mohun Bagan Super Giant.

Ahead of the Indian Super League season, Mumbai's next match was in the 2023-24 AFC Champions League against F.C. Nassaji Mazandaran on 18 September 2023, where Mumbai were defeated 2–0. Mumbai played their first ISL match of the season away against NorthEast United FC on 24 September 2023, winning 2–1 with a Jorge Pereyra Diaz brace securing the win.

Buckingham's last match as Mumbai manager came on 6 November 2023, in a 2–0 loss to Saudi Arabian team Al Hilal. Ten days later, on November 16, Mumbai confirmed Buckingham's departure from the club.

=== Return to Oxford United ===
On 16 November 2023, Buckingham returned to League One club Oxford United, the club he had supported as a boy, on a long-term contract as head coach. He led Oxford to promotion at the end of the season, defeating Bolton Wanderers 2–0 in the play-off final at Wembley to return the club to the Championship for the first time in 25 years. After making a reasonable start in the Championship in 2024–25, he was sacked on 15 December 2024 with the club outside the relegation places in 20th place in the Championship, a decision that surprised and disappointed many supporters.

=== Al-Kholood ===
On 14 August 2025, Saudi Pro League club Al-Kholood announced the appointment of Buckingham as the club's new head coach. In his first season, Buckingham led Al-Kholood to their first-ever King's Cup final, defeating defending champions Al-Ittihad on penalties in the semi-final in March 2026. Al-Kholood were beaten 2–1 by Al-Hilal in the final on 8 May 2026, becoming the first foreign-owned club to contest a Saudi cup final.

Under Buckingham, Al-Kholood also secured their place in the Saudi Pro League for a second consecutive season, retaining their top-flight status for only the second time in the club's history. As King's Cup runners-up, the club qualified for the 2026 Saudi Super Cup, where they were drawn against Al-Nassr in the semi-finals of the tournament, to be held in Kuwait in December 2026.

Buckingham was credited with backing young forward Abdulaziz Al-Aliwa, who joined from Al-Nassr in August 2025. In his first nine league matches for the club, Al-Aliwa played more minutes than in his previous two seasons combined. He went on to play 33 of Al-Kholood's 34 league matches, was named the league's Young Player of the Month four times, and won the Saudi Pro League's Best Young Talent of the Season award for 2025–26. He was also named Player of the Tournament as Saudi Arabia won the U-23 Gulf Cup, and in March 2026 received his first call-up to the senior Saudi Arabia national team, making his international debut in a friendly against Serbia on 31 March 2026. In September 2026, Al-Aliwa was sold to Al-Qadsiah.

Buckingham also handed a professional debut to Guinean defender Mansour Camara, who signed his first professional contract with Al-Kholood in January 2026 and played the full match on his league debut on 13 January 2026. Two months later, Camara received his first call-up to the senior Guinea national team, making his international debut as a substitute in a 2–2 draw with Togo on 27 March 2026.

Buckingham began the 2026–27 season with Al-Kholood unbeaten in their first six league matches, the best opening run in the club's top-flight history. On 29 August 2026, his side defeated Al-Ahli 3–1, ending Al-Ahli's run of 11 consecutive league wins against clubs from the Qassim region and moving Al-Kholood up to third in the table. In the King's Cup, Al-Kholood opened their campaign with a 5–0 away win over First Division side Jeddah in the round of 32.

=== New Zealand ===
On 17 November 2026, it was announced that Buckingham would succeed Darren Bazeley as head coach of the New Zealand national team, with his appointment taking effect on 1 July 2027 and running through to the 2030 FIFA World Cup. His role will also include coaching the men's under-23 team, with responsibility for leading the side's qualification campaign for the 2028 Summer Olympics in Los Angeles.

== Personal life ==
He was inducted into the 2019 edition of the High Performance Sport New Zealand Coach Accelerator Programme, a three-year programme aimed at developing and increasing New Zealand's pool of coaches.

Outside football, Buckingham is a qualified pilot and ski instructor.

== Managerial statistics ==
As of match played 29 October 2026

Managerial record by team and tenure
Team	Nat	From	To	Record								Ref.
Team	Nat	From	To	M	W	D	L	GF	GA	GD	Win %	Ref.
Wellington Phoenix	(New Zealand)	5 December 2016	7 June 2017	19	6	6	7	35	32	+3	31.58	
New Zealand U20	(New Zealand)	23 March 2018	31 December 2019	11	8	1	2	35	7	+28	72.73	
New Zealand U23	(New Zealand)	22 June 2019	30 April 2020	12	9	3	0	57	8	+49	75.00	
Melbourne City (caretaker)	(Australia)	2 March 2021	10 May 2021	3	3	0	0	8	3	+5	100.00	
Mumbai City	(India)	8 October 2021	16 November 2023	72	39	12	21	144	104	+40	54.17	
Oxford United	(England)	16 November 2023	15 December 2024	59	20	16	23	81	84	−3	33.90	
Al-Kholood	(Saudi Arabia)	14 August 2025	Present	50	15	10	25	66	95	−29	30.00	
Total				226	100	48	78	426	333	+93	44.25	

== Honours ==
New Zealand U20

- OFC U-20 Championship: 2018

New Zealand U23

- Pacific Games: 2019
- OFC U-23 Championship: 2019

Melbourne City

- A-League Premiership: 2020–21
- A-League Championship: 2021

Mumbai City

- Indian Super League Winners' Shield: 2022–23
- Durand Cup runner-up: 2022

Oxford United

- EFL League One play-offs: 2024

Al-Kholood

- King's Cup runner-up: 2025–26

Individual

- New Zealand Football Men's Coach of the Year: 2020
- FPAI Coach of the Year: 2023
