= 2025–26 King's Cup (Saudi Arabia) =

Custodian of the Two Holy Mosques Cup

Tournament details
- Country: Saudi Arabia
- Dates: 31 August 2025 – 8 May 2026
- Teams: 32

Final positions
- Champions: Al Hilal (10th title)
- Runners-up: Al-Kholood

Tournament statistics
- Matches played: 31
- Goals scored: 95 (3.06 per match)
- Top goal scorer(s): Ivan Toney (6 goals)

The 2025–26 King's Cup, or The Custodian of the Two Holy Mosques Cup, was the 38th edition of the King's Cup since its establishment in 1966, and the 19th edition since the tournament was relaunched in 2008. The tournament began on 31 August 2025 and concluded with the final on 8 May 2026.

The winner qualifies to the group stage of the 2026–27 AFC Champions League Two.

Al-Ittihad were the defending champions after winning their sixth title last season. They were eliminated in the semi-finals by Al-Kholood on Penalties.

== Participating teams ==
A total of 32 teams participated this season, 18 of which competed in the Pro League and 14 in the First Division.

League	Teams
Pro League	Al-Ahli; Al-Ettifaq; Al-Fateh; Al-Fayha; Al-Hazem; Al-Hilal; Al-Ittihad ^{TH}; Al-Khaleej; Al-Kholood; Al-Najma; Al-Nassr; Al-Okhdood; Al-Qadsiah; Al-Riyadh; Al-Shabab; Al-Taawoun; Damac; Neom
FD League	Abha; Al-Adalah; Al-Arabi; Al-Batin; Al-Bukiryah; Al-Faisaly; Al-Jabalain; Al-Jubail; Al-Orobah; Al-Raed; Al-Tai; Al-Zulfi; Al-Wehda; Jeddah

== Round of 32 ==
The draw for the Round of 32 was held on 2 June 2025. The dates for the Round of 32 fixtures were announced on 12 August 2025. All times are local, SAST (UTC+3).

31 August 2025 1	Al-Arabi (2)	0–5	Al-Ahli (1)	Buraidah
19:00		Report	Toney 31' (pen.), 82', 90+3' (pen.); Millot 45+6'; Al-Rashidi 68'	Stadium: King Abdullah Sports City Stadium Buraidah; Attendance: 1,190; Referee: Florian Badstübner (Germany)

21 September 2025 12	Al-Batin (2)	2–2 (a.e.t.) (4–2 p)	Al-Ettifaq (1)	Hafar al-Batin
18:30	Al-Khathlan 40'; Al-Sahli 90+3'	Report	Hassan 18'; Wijnaldum 47'	Stadium: Al-Batin Club Stadium; Referee: Abdullah Al-Shehri
	Penalties
	Al-Sahli (penalty scored); Al-Khathlan (penalty scored); M'Changama (penalty scored); Al-Shelali (penalty scored)		(penalty scored) Wijnaldum; (penalty scored) Medrán; (penalty missed) Duda; (penalty missed) Calvo

21 September 2025 10	Al-Raed (2)	0–1	Al-Okhdood (1)	Buraidah
18:35		Report	Narey 5'	Stadium: Al-Raed Club Stadium; Referee: Mohammed Al-Ghamdi

21 September 2025 2	Al-Faisaly (2)	0–4	Al-Taawoun (1)	Al-Majma'ah
21:00		Report	Mandash 4', 68'; Barrow 21', 89'	Stadium: Al-Majma'ah Sports City Stadium; Referee: Abdulsamad Bakri

22 September 2025 4	Al-Bukiryah (2)	1–2	Al-Kholood (1)	Al-Bukiryah
18:35	Al-Khalifah 82'	Report	Fallatah 28' (o.g.); Enrique 71'	Stadium: Al-Bukiryah Club Stadium; Referee: Abdullah Al-Kharboush

22 September 2025 9	Al-Tai (2)	0–5	Al-Khaleej (1)	Ha'il
18:45		Report	Masouras 1'; Al-Hawsawi 53'; Al-Quamiri 57' (o.g.); Fernandes 67', 79'	Stadium: Prince Abdulaziz bin Musa'ed Sports City Stadium; Attendance: 1,103; Referee: Mohammed Abu Shaqarah

22 September 2025 11	Abha (2)	2–2 (a.e.t.) (2–4 p)	Al-Shabab (1)	Abha
18:45	Taira 24'; Muralha 97'	Report	Carrasco 13'; Sierro 104'	Stadium: Prince Sultan bin Abdulaziz Sports City Stadium; Attendance: 1,187; Referee: Abdullah Al-Harbi
	Penalties
	Sow (penalty scored); Gaari (penalty missed); Al-Mutairi (penalty missed); Taira (penalty scored)		(penalty scored) Carrasco; (penalty scored) Sierro; (penalty scored) Adli; (penalty missed) Carlos; (penalty scored) Al-Subiani

22 September 2025 13	Al-Adalah (2)	0–1	Al-Hilal (1)	Hofuf
21:30		Report	Al-Hamdan 45+2'	Stadium: Prince Abdullah bin Jalawi Sport City; Attendance: 12,849; Referee: Juan Benítez (Paraguay)

23 September 2025 7	Al-Hazem (1)	2–1	Neom (1)	Ar Rass
18:35	Al Somah 5', 62'	Report	Lacazette 26'	Stadium: Al-Hazem Club Stadium; Referee: Mamdouh Al Shahdan

23 September 2025 15	Al-Najma (1)	2–1	Damac (1)	Buraidah
18:35	Lázaro 58'; Al-Harabi 90+3'	Report	H. Al-Ghamdi 79'	Stadium: King Abdullah Sports City; Referee: Mohammed Al-Dagash

23 September 2025 16	Al-Zulfi (2)	0–0 (a.e.t.) (4–3 p)	Al-Fayha (1)	Al Zulfi
18:35		Report		Stadium: Al-Zulfi Club Stadium; Referee: Abdullah Zarban
	Penalties
	Medioub (penalty scored); Barry (penalty scored); Asiri (penalty missed); Al-Otaibi (penalty scored); Al-Mutairi (penalty missed); Omondi (penalty scored)		(penalty scored) Sakala; (penalty scored) Ganvoula; (penalty missed) Jason; (penalty missed) Al-Abdulmenem; (penalty scored) Bamsaud; (penalty missed) Al-Hussain

23 September 2025 6	Jeddah (2)	0–4	Al-Nassr (1)	Jeddah
21:30		Report	Abu Bakr 8' (o.g.); Wesley 61'; Félix 71'; Simakan 89'	Stadium: Prince Abdullah Al-Faisal Sports City Stadium; Attendance: 3,243; Referee: Abdullah Al-Owaidan

23 September 2025 14	Al-Wehda (2)	0–1	Al-Ittihad (1)	Mecca
21:30		Report	Al-Shehri 9' (pen.)	Stadium: King Abdulaziz Sports City Stadium; Referee: Ahmed Al-Rumaikhani

24 September 2025 8	Al-Jubail (2)	0–1	Al-Riyadh (1)	Qatif
18:10		Report	Al-Shehri 25'	Stadium: Prince Nayef Bin Abdulaziz Sport City Stadium; Referee: Raed Al-Zahrani

24 September 2025 5	Al-Jabalain (2)	1–2	Al-Fateh (1)	Hail
18:45	Touré 30'	Report	Vargas 43'; Toko Ekambi 82'	Stadium: Prince Abdulaziz bin Musa'ed Sports City Stadium; Referee: Ali Al-Qahtani

24 September 2025 3	Al-Orobah (2)	1–3	Al-Qadsiah (1)	Sakakah
21:00	Doumbia 16'	Report	Quiñones 9'; Nacho 35'; Al-Juwayr 69' (pen.)	Stadium: Al-Jawf University Stadium; Referee: Juan Gabriel Calderón (Costa Rica)

== Round of 16 ==
The draw for the Round of 16 was held on 25 September 2025. The dates for the Round of 16 fixtures were announced on 28 September 2025. All times are local, SAST (UTC+3).

27 October 2025 20	Al-Khaleej (1)	1–1 (a.e.t.) (5–3 p)	Al-Taawoun (1)	Dammam
17:35	King 8'	Report	Martínez 24'	Stadium: Prince Mohamed bin Fahd Stadium; Referee: Shukri Al-Hanfoush
	Penalties
	Al-Amri (penalty scored); Masouras (penalty scored); Al-Hawsawi (penalty scored); Al Haydar (penalty scored); Kourbelis (penalty scored)		(penalty scored) El Mahdioui; (penalty scored) Adam; (penalty scored) Girotto; (penalty missed) Al-Ahmed

27 October 2025 21	Al-Fateh (1)	2–0	Al-Riyadh (1)	Al-Hasa
17:35	Batna 63'; Al-Zubaidi 74'	Report		Stadium: Maydan Tamweel Aloula; Attendance: 3,134; Referee: Abdullah Al-Kharboush

27 October 2025 17	Al-Kholood (1)	1–0 (a.e.t.)	Al-Najma (1)	Buraidah
18:00	Enrique 99'	Report		Stadium: King Abdullah Sports City; Referee: Mohammed Al-Ismail

27 October 2025 18	Al-Batin (2)	0–3	Al-Ahli (1)	Hafar al-Batin
21:00		Report	Al-Jalfan 22' (o.g.); Al-Buraikan 50'; Toney 66'	Stadium: Al-Batin Club Stadium; Attendance: 1,580; Referee: Radu Petrescu (Romania)

28 October 2025 19	Al-Qadsiah (1)	3–1	Al-Hazem (1)	Dammam
17:35	Retegui 22'; Quiñones 54', 63' (pen.)	Report	Al-Habshi 9'	Stadium: Prince Mohamed bin Fahd Stadium; Attendance: 4,537; Referee: João Pinheiro (Portugal)

28 October 2025 24	Al-Shabab (1)	1–0	Al-Zulfi (2)	Riyadh
17:50	Carrasco 35' (pen.)	Report		Stadium: SHG Arena; Attendance: 2,857; Referee: Fareeh Al-Jaloud

28 October 2025 23	Al-Okhdood (1)	0–1	Al-Hilal (1)	Najran
18:10		Report	Leonardo 45+3' (pen.)	Stadium: Prince Hathloul bin Abdulaziz Sports City; Attendance: 5,740; Referee: Slavko Vinčić (Slovenia)

28 October 2025 22	Al-Nassr (1)	1–2	Al-Ittihad (1)	Riyadh
21:00	Ângelo 30'		Benzema 15'; Aouar 45+2'	Stadium: Al-Awwal Park; Attendance: 23,649; Referee: Khalid Al-Turais

== Quarter-finals ==
The draw for the Quarter-finals was held on 29 October 2025. The dates for the Quarter-finals fixtures were announced on 2 November 2025. All times are local, SAST (UTC+3).

28 November 2025 25	Al-Kholood (1)	4–3	Al-Khaleej (1)	Ar Rass
17:50	Enrique 3'; Maolida 24'; Bahebri 45+3'; Buckley 83'	Report	Hamzi 45+1'; Al-Amri 47'; Pinas 90+2' (o.g.)	Stadium: Al-Hazem Club Stadium; Attendance: 1,183; Referee: Majed Al-Shamrani

28 November 2025 28	Al-Ahli (1)	3–3 (a.e.t.) (5–4 p)	Al-Qadsiah (1)	Jeddah
20:30	Toney 36' (pen.); Atangana 61'; Kessié 73'	Report	Retegui 11', 45+4' (pen.); Quiñones 30'	Stadium: Prince Abdullah Al-Faisal Sports City Stadium; Attendance: 16,661; Referee: Luís Godinho (Portugal)
	Penalties
	Toney (penalty scored); Mahrez (penalty scored); Kessié (penalty scored); Abu Al-Shamat (penalty scored); Al-Buraikan (penalty scored)		(penalty scored) Retegui; (penalty missed) Al Salem; (penalty scored) Weigl; (penalty scored) Al-Juwayr; (penalty scored) Nacho

29 November 2025 27	Al-Hilal (1)	4–1	Al-Fateh (1)	Riyadh
17:40	Malcom 21'; Neves 23'; Al-Tambakti 35'; Leonardo 49'	Report	Vargas 90+2'	Stadium: Kingdom Arena; Attendance: 19,100; Referee: Donatas Rumšas (Lithuania)

29 November 2025 26	Al-Ittihad (1)	4–1	Al-Shabab (1)	Jeddah
20:30	Doumbia 20'; Benzema 30', 84', 87'	Report	Hamdallah 14'	Stadium: King Abdullah Sports City Stadium; Attendance: 15,292; Referee: Danny Makkelie (Netherlands)

== Semi-finals ==
All times are local, AST (UTC+3).

18 March 2026 29	Al Ahli (1)	1–1 (a.e.t.) (2–4 p)	Al Hilal (1)	Jeddah
22:00	Toney 81' (pen.)	Report	Hernandez 39'	Stadium: King Abdullah Sports City Stadium; Attendance: 46,519; Referee: Leandro Rey Hilfer (Argentina)
	Penalties
	Toney (penalty missed); Kessié (penalty scored); Galeno (penalty missed); Al-Johani (penalty scored)		(penalty scored) Neves; (penalty scored) Leonardo; (penalty scored) Mandash; (penalty scored) Hernandez

18 March 2026 30	Al-Kholood (1)	2–2 (a.e.t.) (5–4 p)	Al Ittihad (1)	Ar Rass
22:00	Al-Aliwa 73'; Berry 111'	Report	Diaby 40'; Bergwijn 96'	Stadium: Al-Hazem Club Stadium; Attendance: 2,067; Referee: Sergey Ivanov (Russia)
	Penalties
	Pinas (penalty scored); Guga (penalty scored); Utkus (penalty scored); Al-Dawsari (penalty scored); Gyömbér (penalty missed); Kortajarena (penalty scored)		(penalty scored) Fabinho; (penalty missed) Aouar; (penalty scored) Pereira; (penalty scored) Mitaj; (penalty scored) Al-Shehri; (penalty missed) Diaby

== Final ==
8 May 2026 31	Al-Kholood (1)	1–2	Al Hilal (1)	Jeddah
21:00	Enrique 4'	Report	N. Al-Dawsari 42'; Hernandez 45+2'	Stadium: King Abdullah Sports City Stadium; Referee: Daniel Siebert (Germany)

== Top goalscorers ==
Rank	Player	Club	Goals
1	(England) Ivan Toney	Al-Ahli	6
2	(Mexico) Julián Quiñones	Al-Qadsiah	4
2	(France) Karim Benzema	Al-Ittihad	4
2	(Argentina) Ramiro Enrique	Al-Kholood	4
5	(Italy) Mateo Retegui	Al-Qadsiah	3
