= Ramiro Enrique =

Argentine footballer (born 2001)

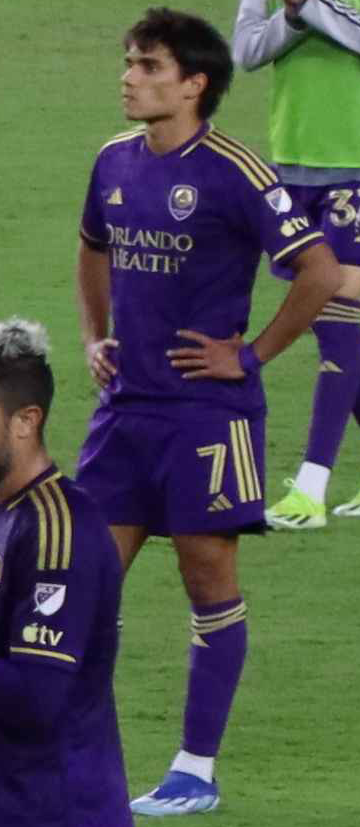
- Enrique with Orlando City in 2024

Personal information
- Full name: Ramiro Enrique Paz
- Date of birth: 4 May 2001 (age 25)
- Place of birth: Burzaco, Argentina
- Height: 1.71 m (5 ft 7 in)
- Position: Forward

Team information
- Current team: Al-Kholood
- Number: 18

Youth career
- River Plate
- Banfield

Senior career*
Years	Team	Apps	(Gls)
2021–2023	Banfield	51	(8)
2023–2025	Orlando City	74	(20)
2025–	Al-Kholood	27	(15)

International career
2019	Argentina U18		
- * Club domestic league appearances and goals as of 01:35, 20 May 2026 (UTC)

Ramiro Enrique Paz (born 4 May 2001) is an Argentine professional footballer who plays as a forward for Saudi Pro League club Al-Kholood.

Enrique began his professional career with Banfield, whom he graduated from the youth ranks of. Prior to making his professional debut, Enrique was called up to the Argentina U18 squad. After three seasons with Banfield, Enrique transferred to Major League Soccer franchise Orlando City. In the 2024 season, Enrique scored across six consecutive matches in all competitions, a team record. Partway through the following season, Enrique transferred to Saudi Pro League club Al-Kholood.

== Club career ==
Enrique progressed through the youth ranks of River Plate.

=== Banfield ===
On 25 July 2019, he signed a three-year contract with Banfield. He was promoted to the club's senior squad under manager Javier Sanguinetti at the beginning of 2021, having only previously been called up to train with them and featuring in a friendly in October 2020 against Talleres. On 12 February 2021, he made his senior professional debut, entering as a 73rd-minute substitute for Luciano Pons in a 2–0 victory over Racing Club in the 2021 Copa de la Liga Profesional group stage. He scored his first senior goal in the same competition, the equalizer of a 2–2 draw with Estudiantes de La Plata on 5 April 2021.

=== Orlando City ===
==== 2023 ====
On 26 January 2023, Enrique signed for Orlando City of Major League Soccer on a three-year contract with two additional club option years. He was rostered under the MLS U22 initiative. He made his debut for the club on 26 February 2023, replacing Ercan Kara in the 63rd minute of a 1–0 win over the New York Red Bulls. Enrique scored his first goal for the club in a 2–0 victory over the Colorado Rapids on 10 June. On 18 September, Enrique was named Player of the Matchday for scoring his first brace of his career and providing an assist in a 4–3 comeback victory against Columbus Crew two days earlier.

==== 2024 ====
On 9 March 2024, Enrique was involved in a mass confrontation incident in a match against Minnesota United in which he argued with Minnesota United player Michael Boxall and pushed him several times, sparking a larger incident between the two teams. Enrique was fined three days later by the MLS Disciplinary Committee alongside Minnesota United player Dayne St. Clair for their roles in the incident. Later that season, Enrique scored a goal in six matches across all competitions in a row from 6 July to 4 August, with the streak only ending after a 0–0 draw against Cruz Azul before Orlando City lost 5–4 on penalties. With four consecutive league goals in a row, Enrique matched Dom Dwyer, Nani, and Daryl Dike's record for the most consecutive goals across league matches for the club.

On 28 September, Enrique helped to secure Orlando's fifth consecutive play-offs qualification by providing a goal and an assist in a 3–1 win at FC Dallas, a feat which would ultimately see him named to the Team of the Matchday two days later. Just two matchdays later on 5 October, Enrique again provided a Team of the Matchday performance as he scored a brace and provided an assist in a 3–1 win at FC Cincinnati.

==== 2025 ====
On 25 June 2025, Enrique scored a brace at St. Louis City SC in a 4–2 win, and for his performance he was named to the Team of the Matchday a day later. On 25 July, Enrique scored a brace after coming on as a 67th-minute substitute for Luis Muriel, helping Orlando City overcome a one-goal deficit against Columbus Crew and end the game 3–1 in their favour. Three days later, Enrique was named to the Team of the Matchday for his performance.

=== Al-Kholood ===
On 8 September 2025, Enrique joined Saudi Pro League club Al-Kholood. Enrique made his debut on 14 September as Al-Kholood lost 2–0 at Al-Nassr. In the following match on 18 September, Enrique scored his first goal to help Al-Kholood to a 2–1 win over Damac Club. In his King's Cup debut against Al-Bukiryah four days later, Enrique scored the winning goal to secure a 2–1 scoreline. Enrique ultimately extended the streak to four games in a row when he converted a penalty in a 5–1 win over Al-Najma until 17 October. On 20 January 2026, Enrique scored his first brace for Al-Kholood in a 5–2 win at Al-Fateh. On 8 May, Enrique scored in the fourth minute of the 2025–26 King's Cup final against Al Hilal, but goals from Al Hilal's Nasser Al-Dawsari and Théo Hernandez saw Al-Kholood lose 2–1.

== International career ==
Enrique received call-ups at under-18 level from Argentina in 2019.

== Personal life ==
Enrique is the son of 1986 FIFA World Cup winner Héctor Enrique. His uncle, Carlos, also played professional football. He also has two brothers, Fernando and Facundo, who are also sportsmen; in football and rugby, respectively.

== Career statistics ==
As of match played 12 May 2026

Appearances and goals by club, season and competition
Club	Season	League			National cup (Note: Includes Copa Argentina, U.S. Open Cup, and King's Cup)		League cup (Note: Includes Copa de la Liga Profesional and MLS Cup playoffs)		Continental (Note: Includes Copa Sudamericana and CONCACAF Champions Cup)		Other		Total	
Club	Season	Division	Apps	Goals	Apps	Goals	Apps	Goals	Apps	Goals	Apps	Goals	Apps	Goals
Banfield	2021	Primera División	24	3	2 (Note: Delayed 2019–20 Copa Argentina played in 2021)	0	13	2	—		1 (Note: Appearance in 2022 Copa Sudamericana qualifying play-off)	0	40	5
Banfield	2022	Primera División	27	5	4	1	1	1	1	0	—		33	7
Banfield	Total		51	8	6	1	14	3	1	0	1	0	73	12
Orlando City	2023	Major League Soccer	30	4	1	0	3	0	2	0	3 (Note: Appearances in Leagues Cup)	0	39	4
Orlando City	2024	Major League Soccer	20	8	—		5	1	4	0	3	2	32	11
Orlando City	2025	Major League Soccer	24	8	2	2	—		—		5	0	31	10
Orlando City	Total		74	20	3	2	8	1	6	0	11	2	102	25
Al-Kholood	2025–26	Saudi Pro League	27	15	5	4	—		—		—		32	19
Career total			151	43	14	7	22	4	7	0	12	2	206	55

== Honours ==
Al-Kholood

- King's Cup: 2025–26 (runners-up)
