= William Troost-Ekong =

Nigeria international footballer (born 1993)

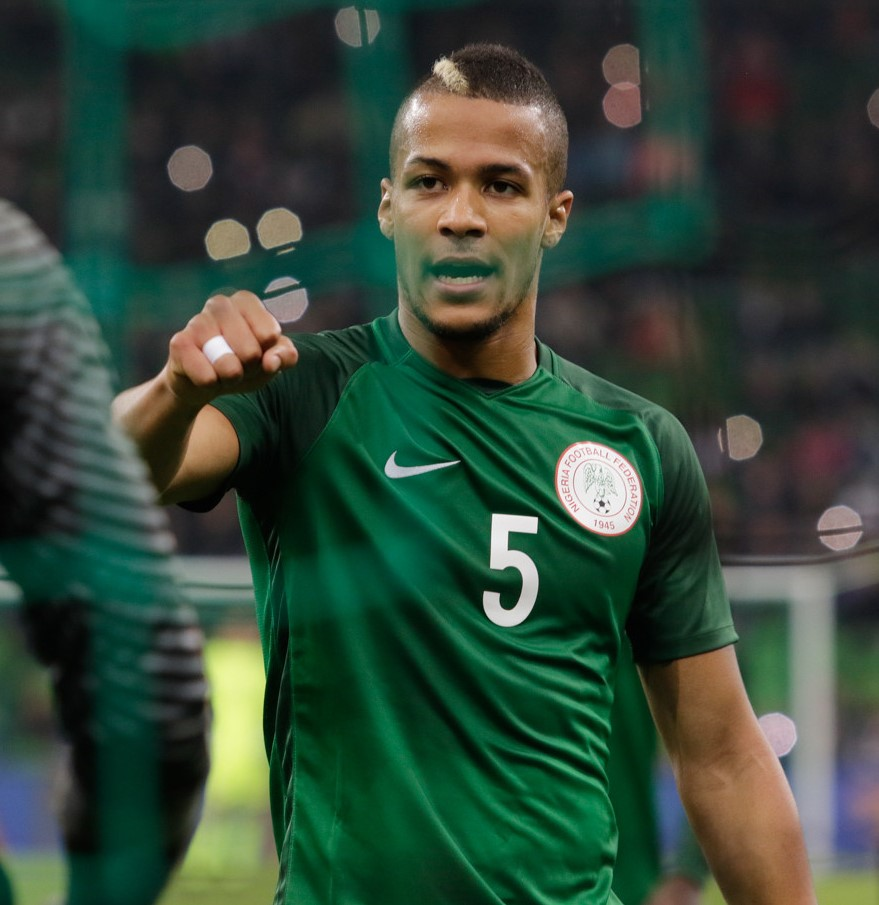
- Troost-Ekong playing for Nigeria in 2017

Personal information
- Full name: William Paul Troost-Ekong
- Date of birth: 1 September 1993 (age 33)
- Place of birth: Haarlem, Netherlands
- Height: 1.91 m (6 ft 3 in)
- Position: Centre-back

Team information
- Current team: Al-Ahli
- Number: 5

Youth career
- 2008–2010: Fulham
- 2010–2013: Tottenham Hotspur

Senior career*
Years	Team	Apps	(Gls)
2013–2015	Groningen	2	(0)
2014–2015	→ Dordrecht (loan)	32	(0)
2015–2017	Gent	8	(0)
2015–2016	→ Haugesund (loan)	37	(3)
2017–2018	Bursaspor	28	(3)
2018–2020	Udinese	65	(0)
2020–2023	Watford	64	(2)
2023	→ Salernitana (loan)	9	(1)
2023–2024	PAOK	10	(0)
2024–2026	Al-Kholood	45	(2)
2026–	Al-Ahli	10	(1)

International career
2011	Netherlands U19	1	(0)
2013	Netherlands U20	2	(0)
2016	Nigeria U23	6	(0)
2015–2025	Nigeria	82	(8)
Medal record
Men's football
Representing Nigeria
Summer Olympics
Bronze medal – third place	2016 Rio de Janeiro
Africa Cup of Nations
Runner-up	2023 Ivory Coast
Third place	2019 Egypt
- * Club domestic league appearances and goals as of 23:22, 9 September 2026 (UTC)

William Paul Troost-Ekong MFR MON (born 1 September 1993) is a professional footballer who plays as a centre-back for Qatar Stars League club Al-Ahli. Born in the Netherlands, he played for the Nigeria national team, earning more than 80 caps and serving as captain.

== Club career ==
Troost-Ekong attended secondary school at Hockerill Anglo-European College in Bishop's Stortford, in England. He played football at youth level in England for Fulham and Tottenham Hotspur, Troost-Ekong began his senior career in the Netherlands with FC Groningen and FC Dordrecht.

After being linked abroad with transfers to Celtic among others, he signed for Belgian club KAA Gent in July 2015 and was immediately loaned out to Norwegian club FK Haugesund.

In July 2017, Troost-Ekong signed for Turkish Süper Lig club Bursaspor.

On 17 August 2018, Troost-Ekong joined Italian Serie A club Udinese. In his debut season in the Serie A, he made 35 league appearances and was booked four times, helping Udinese to 12th position. The next season, Udinese finished 13th, albeit with two more points. Despite the team's relatively lacklustre league campaigns, Troost-Ekong started (and played for the full 90 minutes) in memorable victories against AC Milan and Juventus in his two seasons at Le Zebrette.

On 29 September 2020, Troost-Ekong signed for EFL Championship side Watford on a five-year contract deal. He scored his first goal for the club in a 3–2 win over Coventry City on 7 November 2020.

On 24 January 2023, Troost-Ekong signed for Serie A club Salernitana on a loan with the option to buy at the end of the season.

On 4 July 2023, he joined Super League Greece club PAOK on a permanent deal for a free transfer.

On 23 August 2024, Troost-Ekong joined Saudi Arabian club Al-Kholood.

On 20 January 2026, Troost-Ekong joined Qatar Stars League club Al-Ahli on a free transfer.

== International career ==
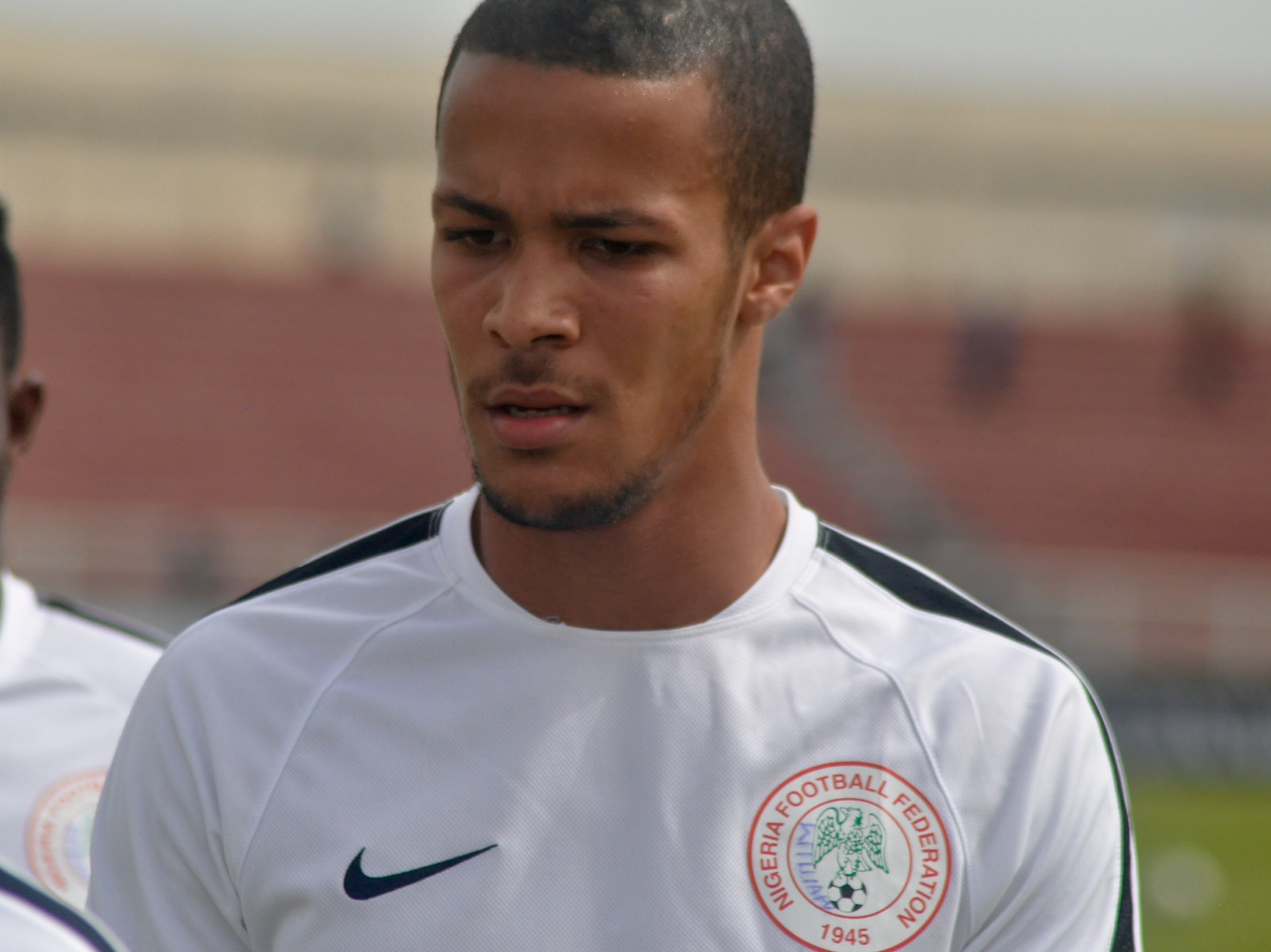
Troost-Ekong training with Nigeria in 2015

Troost-Ekong was born in the Netherlands to a Dutch mother, Eleanore Troost and a Nigerian father. He has two siblings, Emily and Everest.

After representing the Netherlands at under-19 and under-20 youth levels, Troost-Ekong eventually chose to represent Nigeria. He made his senior international debut for the Super Eagles on 13 June 2015, playing 90 minutes in an AFCON qualifying match against Chad.

He made three starts for the senior team in 2016 before being selected for Nigeria's under-23 team in their 35-man provisional squad for the Rio 2016 Summer Olympics. In June 2018 he was named in Nigeria's 23-man squad for the 2018 FIFA World Cup in Russia.

Troost-Ekong was named in the country's 23-man squad for the 2019 Africa Cup of Nations, where he scored an 89th-minute winner against South Africa to send his team through to the semi-finals on the way to a third-place finish.

He captained the Super Eagles in the delayed 2021 Africa Cup of Nations, and was named in the tournament Technical Study Group's Best XI of the Group Stage, scoring against Guinea-Bissau. Nigeria went on to be knocked out by Tunisia in the following round.

During the 2022 World Cup qualification third round, he scored a penalty in the second leg match against Ghana, which ended in a 1–1 draw and a defeat on the away goals rule; hence, his nation failed to reach the main tournament in Qatar.

On 29 December 2023, Troost-Ekong was named in the 25-man squad for the 2023 Africa Cup of Nations in Ivory Coast. He converted a penalty in a 1–0 win in the second group stage match against Ivory Coast. In the semi-final match against South Africa, he scored another penalty to grant his team the lead in a 1–1 draw, before scoring during the shootouts which ended in a 4–2 win. He later scored the first goal in the final match against Ivory Coast which ended in a 2–1 defeat. Nonetheless, he managed to win the Player of the Tournament award.

His tally of five goals at the Africa Cup of Nations set a new record for the most goals scored by a defender in the competition's history, surpassing the previous mark held by Stephen Keshi.

On 4 December 2025, Troost-Ekong announced his retirement from international football with Nigeria, just weeks ahead of the 2025 Africa Cup of Nations.

== Outside football ==
William founded the Troost-Ekong Foundation, a non-profit organization aimed at empowering Nigerian and African youth through football and education.

In 2025, AF Global Football launched the William Troost-Ekong Scholarship Award, a youth scholarship competition run via the aiScout platform that offers a fully funded boarding place at one of its UK-based elite school academies.

== Career statistics ==
=== Club ===
As of match played 9 January 2026

Appearances and goals by club, season and competition
Club	Season	League			National cup (Note: Includes KNVB Cup, Norwegian Cup, Turkish Cup, Coppa Italia, FA Cup, King's Cup)		League cup (Note: Includes EFL Cup)		Continental		Other		Total	
Club	Season	Division	Apps	Goals	Apps	Goals	Apps	Goals	Apps	Goals	Apps	Goals	Apps	Goals
Groningen	2013–14	Eredivisie	2	0	—		—		—		—		2	0
Dordrecht (loan)	2013–14	Eerste Divisie	10	0	—		—		—		1 (Note: Appearance in Eerste Divisie promotion play-offs)	0	11	0
Dordrecht (loan)	2014–15	Eredivisie	22	0	1	0	—		—		—		23	0
Dordrecht (loan)	Total		32	0	1	0	0	0	0	0	1	0	34	0
Haugesund (loan)	2015	Eliteserien	13	0	—		—		—		—		13	0
Haugesund (loan)	2016	Eliteserien	24	3	4	1	—		—		—		28	4
Haugesund (loan)	Total		37	3	4	1	0	0	0	0	0	0	41	4
Gent	2016–17	Belgian Pro League	8	0	0	0	—		—		—		8	0
Bursaspor	2017–18	Süper Lig	27	2	4	0	—		—		—		31	2
Bursaspor	2018–19	Süper Lig	1	1	0	0	—		—		—		1	1
Bursaspor	Total		28	3	4	0	0	0	0	0	0	0	32	3
Udinese	2018–19	Serie A	35	0	0	0	—		—		—		35	0
Udinese	2019–20	Serie A	30	0	1	0	—		—		—		31	0
Udinese	Total		65	0	1	0	0	0	0	0	0	0	66	0
Watford	2020–21	Championship	32	1	1	0	0	0	—		—		33	1
Watford	2021–22	Premier League	17	0	1	0	0	0	—		—		18	0
Watford	2022–23	Championship	15	1	1	0	1	0	—		—		17	1
Watford	Total		64	2	3	0	1	0	0	0	0	0	68	2
Salernitana (loan)	2022–23	Serie A	9	1	—		—		—		—		9	1
PAOK	2023–24	Super League Greece	10	0	0	0	—		12 (Note: Appearances in UEFA Europa Conference League)	0	—		22	0
PAOK	2024–25	Super League Greece	0	0	—		—		2 (Note: Appearances in UEFA Champions League)	1	—		2	1
PAOK	Total		10	0	0	0	0	0	14	1	0	0	24	1
Al-Kholood	2024–25	Saudi Pro League	32	2	1	0	—		—		—		33	2
Al-Kholood	2025–26	Saudi Pro League	13	0	3	0	—		—		—		16	0
Al-Kholood	Total		45	2	4	0	0	0	0	0	0	0	49	2
Career total			300	11	17	1	1	0	14	1	1	0	333	13

=== International ===
Appearances and goals by national team and year
National team	Year	Apps	Goals
Nigeria	2015	4	0
Nigeria	2016	5	0
Nigeria	2017	7 (Note: Troost-Ekong also appeared in one match against Togo in 2017, however Nigeria made nine substitutions during this match, and therefore it is not recognised as an official match by FIFA.)	0
Nigeria	2018	12	1
Nigeria	2019	14	1
Nigeria	2020	3	0
Nigeria	2021	8	0
Nigeria	2022	10	2
Nigeria	2023	0	0
Nigeria	2024	12	3
Nigeria	2025	7	1
Total		82	8

Scores and results list Nigeria's goal tally first, score column indicates score after each Troost-Ekong goal.

List of international goals scored by William Troost-Ekong
No.	Date	Venue	Opponent	Score	Result	Competition
1	28 May 2018	Adokiye Amiesimaka Stadium, Port Harcourt, Nigeria	DR Congo	1–0	1–1	Friendly
2	10 July 2019	Cairo International Stadium, Cairo, Egypt	South Africa	2–1	2–1	2019 Africa Cup of Nations
3	19 January 2022	Roumdé Adjia Stadium, Garoua, Cameroon	Guinea-Bissau	2–0	2–0	2021 Africa Cup of Nations
4	29 March 2022	Moshood Abiola National Stadium, Abuja, Nigeria	Ghana	1–1	1–1	2022 FIFA World Cup qualification
5	18 January 2024	Alassane Ouattara Stadium, Abidjan, Ivory Coast	Ivory Coast	1–0	1–0	2023 Africa Cup of Nations
6	7 February 2024	Stade de la Paix, Bouaké, Ivory Coast	South Africa	1–0	1–1 (a.e.t.)	2023 Africa Cup of Nations
7	11 February 2024	Alassane Ouattara Stadium, Abidjan, Ivory Coast	Ivory Coast	1–0	1–2	2023 Africa Cup of Nations
8	10 October 2025	Peter Mokaba Stadium, Polokwane, South Africa	Lesotho	1–0	2–1	2026 FIFA World Cup qualification

== Honours ==
PAOK

- Super League Greece: 2023–24

Nigeria U23

- Olympic Bronze Medal: 2016

Nigeria

- Africa Cup of Nations runner-up: 2023; third place: 2019

Individual

- Africa Cup of Nations Player of the Tournament: 2023
- Africa Cup of Nations Team of the Tournament: 2023

Orders

- Member of the Order of the Niger
