= Hattan Bahebri =

Saudi Arabian footballer (born 1992)

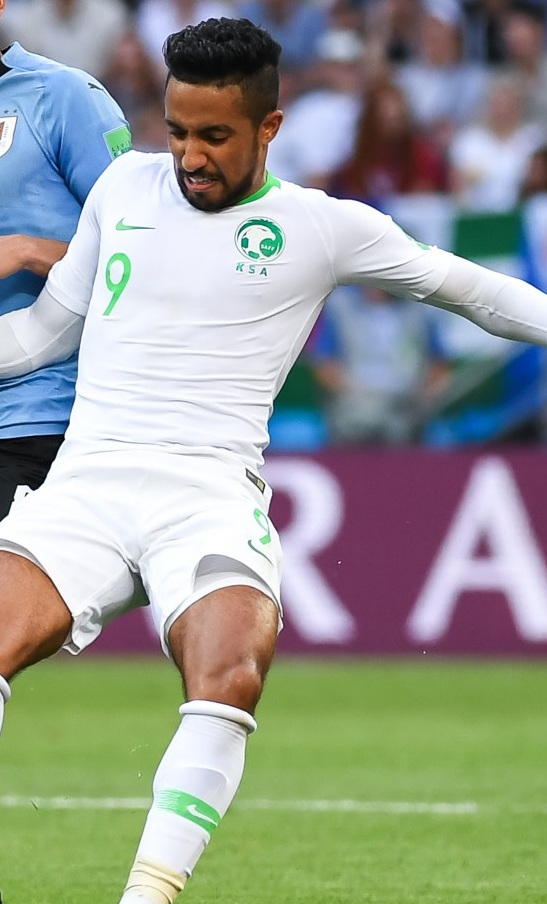
- Bahebri with Saudi Arabia at the 2018 FIFA World Cup

Personal information
- Full name: Hattan Sultan Ahmed Bahebri
- Date of birth: 16 July 1992 (age 34)
- Place of birth: Jeddah, Saudi Arabia
- Height: 1.68 m (5 ft 6 in)
- Position: Winger

Team information
- Current team: Al-Diriyah
- Number: 11

Youth career
- 2002–2011: Al-Ittihad

Senior career*
Years	Team	Apps	(Gls)
2011–2016	Al-Ittihad	27	(0)
2014–2016	→ Al-Khaleej (loan)	42	(6)
2016–2019	Al-Shabab	48	(8)
2019–2021	Al-Hilal	27	(5)
2021–2024	Al-Shabab	71	(9)
2024–2025	Al-Taawoun	18	(2)
2025–2026	Al-Kholood	31	(5)
2026–	Al-Diriyah	2	(0)

International career
2010–2013	Saudi Arabia U23	5	(2)
2011–2022	Saudi Arabia	43	(4)
- * Club domestic league appearances and goals as of 25 August 2026

Hattan Sultan Ahmed Bahebri (Arabic: هتان سلطان أحمد باهبري; born 16 July 1992) is a Saudi Arabian professional footballer who plays as a winger and attacking midfielder for Al-Diriyah and the Saudi Arabia national team, appearing at the 2018 and 2022 World Cups.

== Club career ==
Hattan progressed through the youth ranks of Al-Ittihad At the age of 10. He was first called up to the first team during the Quarter-final match against FC Seoul in 2011 AFC Champions League. He made his first team debut during the 2011–12 season against Al-Taawoun. He spent four seasons with the club and made 37 appearances with club scoring 0 goals and assisting 4 goals.

On 1 July 2014, Bahebri joined fellow Pro League side Al-Khaleej on loan for the 2014–15 season. On 10 July 2015, the loan was renewed for a further season. He ended his time with Al-Khaleej making 46 appearances and scoring 6 goals.

On 1 August 2016, Bahebri signed a 3-year contract with Al-Shabab. He ended his first season with the club making 18 appearances and scoring twice. Bahebri excelled in his second season with the club, earning him a call-up to the national team for the 23rd Arabian Gulf Cup. He made his first cap in nearly 6 years during the opening match against Kuwait. He spent two and a half seasons with the club making 53 appearances and scoring 8 goals in all competitions. During this time, Bahebri represented the national team in 3 tournaments, the 23rd Arabian Gulf Cup, the 2018 FIFA World Cup and the 2019 AFC Asian Cup.

On 1 February 2019, Bahebri joined city rivals and Pro League champions Al-Hilal on a three-year contract.

On 31 August 2021, Bahebri rejoined Al-Shabab.

On 3 September 2024, Bahebri joined Al-Taawoun on a free transfer.

On 21 August 2025, Bahebri joined Al-Kholood.

== Career statistics ==
=== Club ===
As of 30 May 2024

Club	Season	League		King Cup		Crown Prince Cup (Note: Discontinued in 19 September 2017)		Asia		Other		Total	
Club	Season	Apps	Goals	Apps	Goals	Apps	Goals	Apps	Goals	Apps	Goals	Apps	Goals
Al-Ittihad	2010–11	0	0	0	0	0	0	0	0	—		0	0
Al-Ittihad	2011–12	8	0	2	0	1	0	3	0	—		14	0
Al-Ittihad	2012–13	14	0	1	0	0	0	—				15	0
Al-Ittihad	2013–14	5	0	1	0	1	0	1	0	—		8	0
Al-Ittihad	Club Total	27	0	4	0	2	0	4	0	0	0	37	0
Al-Khaleej	2014–15	18	1	0	0	1	0	—				19	1
Al-Khaleej	2015–16	24	5	1	0	2	0	—				27	5
Al-Khaleej	Club Total	42	6	1	0	3	0	0	0	0	0	46	6
Al-Shabab	2016–17	18	2	0	0	2	0	—				20	2
Al-Shabab	2017–18	18	5	2	1	1	0	—				21	6
Al-Shabab	2018–19	12	1	0	0	—						12	1
Al-Shabab	Club Total	48	8	2	1	3	0	0	0	0	0	53	9
Al-Hilal	2018–19	5	0	2	0	—		9	1	4 (Note: Appearances in Arab Club Champions Cup)	0	20	1
Al-Hilal	2019–20	10	0	2	1	—		3	1	1 (Note: Appearances in FIFA Club World Cup)	0	16	2
Al-Hilal	2020–21	12	0	0	0	—		6	2	0	0	18	2
Al-Hilal	Club Total	27	0	4	1	0	0	18	4	5	0	54	5
Al-Shabab	2021–22	26	7	3	0	—		4	3	—		33	10
Al-Shabab	2022–23	25	2	1	0	—		2	0	2	0	30	2
Al-Shabab	2023–24	20	0	3	1	—				5	0	28	1
Al-Shabab	Club Total	71	9	7	1	0	0	6	3	7	0	91	13
Al-Taawoun	2024–25	18	2	3	0	—		6	0	—		27	2
Al-Kholood	2025–26	0	0	0	0	—		—		—		0	0
Career totals		233	25	21	3	8	0	34	7	12	0	308	35

=== International ===
Statistics accurate as of match played 30 November 2022.

Saudi Arabia
Year	Apps	Goals
2011	1	0
2017	2	0
2018	12	0
2019	12	4
2020	2	0
2021	0	0
2022	14	0
Total	43	4

=== International goals ===
Scores and results list Saudi Arabia's goal tally first.

Goal	Date	Venue	Opponent	Score	Result	Competition
1.	8 January 2019	Maktoum Bin Rashid Al Maktoum Stadium, Dubai, UAE	North Korea	1–0	4–0	2019 AFC Asian Cup
2.	10 September 2019	Bahrain National Stadium, Riffa, Bahrain	Yemen	1–1	2–2	2022 FIFA World Cup qualification
3.	2 December 2019	Abdullah bin Khalifa Stadium, Doha, Qatar	Oman	2–0	3–1	24th Arabian Gulf Cup
4.	2 December 2019	Abdullah bin Khalifa Stadium, Doha, Qatar	Oman	3–1	3–1	24th Arabian Gulf Cup

== Honors ==
Al-Ittihad

- King Cup: 2013

Al-Hilal

- Saudi Professional League: 2019–20, 2020–21
- King Cup: 2019–20
- AFC Champions League: 2019, 2021
