= Ben Harburg =

American businessman

- Born: Benjamin Harburg
- Occupation: Football club owner
- Organization: Al-Kholood Club

Benjamin Harburg is an American businessman who is the owner of Al-Kholood Club.

== Early life ==
Harburg was born in the United States and moved with his family to El Puerto de Santa María, Spain at the age of eleven. Growing up, he attended Free University of Berlin in Germany, where he studied Islamic studies and Oriental studies. Following his stint there, he attended Tufts University in the United States.

== Career ==
Harburg worked for Chinese investment company MSA Capital. During the summer of 2025, he became the majority owner of Saudi Arabian side Al-Kholood Club.
