= Mohammed Mazyad =

Saudi Arabian footballer (born 1991)

Personal information
- Full name: Mohammed Mazyad Mofrah Al-Shammari
- Date of birth: December 10, 1991 (age 34)
- Place of birth: Saudi Arabia
- Height: 1.84 m (6 ft 0 in)
- Position: Goalkeeper

Youth career
- Al-Jabalain

Senior career*
Years	Team	Apps	(Gls)
2012–2016	Al-Jabalain	43	(0)
2016–2019	Al-Tai	42	(0)
2019–2022	Al-Ain	44	(0)
2022	Al-Sahel	8	(0)
2022–2024	Al-Arabi	19	(0)
2024–2026	Al-Kholood	2	(0)
- * Club domestic league appearances and goals as of 20 September 2020

Mohammed Mazyad (Arabic: محمد مزيد; born 10 December 1991) is a Saudi Arabian professional footballer who plays as a goalkeeper.

== Club career ==
Mohammed Mazyad started his career in the youth team of Al-Jabalain. He was promoted to the first team in 2012 and spent four seasons at the club. With Al-Jabalain, Mazyad won the 2014–15 Saudi Third Division title and achieved promotion to the Saudi Second Division. On 11 July 2016, Mazyad joined city rivals Al-Tai on a two-year deal. He made his debut on 6 January 2017 in the league match against Wej. He spent three seasons at the club and made 42 league appearances for the club. On 17 June 2019, Mazyad joined Al-Ain. In his first season at the club, Mazyad kept 17 clean sheets in 36 appearances, the most by any keeper in the league. Mazyad also helped Al-Ain get promoted to the Pro League for the first time in the club's history. On 27 January 2022, Mazyad joined Al-Sahel. On 6 June 2022, Mazyad joined newly promoted side Al-Arabi. On 23 July 2024, Mazyad joined Al-Kholood.

== Career statistics ==
=== Club ===
As of 20 September 2020

Club	Season	League			King Cup		Other		Total	
Club	Season	Division	Apps	Goals	Apps	Goals	Apps	Goals	Apps	Goals
Al-Tai	2016–17	First Division	15	0	2	0	0	0	17	0
Al-Tai	2017–18	MS League	15	0	0	0	—		15	0
Al-Tai	2018–19	MS League	12	0	0	0	—		12	0
Al-Tai	Club Total		42	0	2	0	0	0	44	0
Al-Ain	2019–20	MS League	36	0	1	0	—		37	0
Al-Ain	2020–21	Pro League	8	0	1	0	—		9	0
Al-Ain	Club Total		44	0	2	0	0	0	46	0
Career Total			86	0	4	0	0	0	90	0

== Honours ==
Al-Jabalain

- Saudi Third Division: 2014–15
