= Abdulaziz Al-Aliwa =

Saudi Arabian footballer

Abdulaziz Al-Aliwa عبد العزيز العليوه
Personal information
- Full name: Abdulaziz Saud Al-Aliwa
- Date of birth: 11 February 2004 (age 22)
- Place of birth: Al-Kharj, Saudi Arabia
- Position: Winger

Team information
- Current team: Al-Qadsiah
- Number: 46

Youth career
- Al-Nassr

Senior career*
Years	Team	Apps	(Gls)
2022–2025	Al-Nassr	10	(2)
2024–2025	→ Al-Ettifaq (loan)	6	(0)
2025–2026	Al-Kholood	37	(5)
2026–	Al-Qadsiah	0	(0)

International career^{‡}
2022–	Saudi Arabia U20	10	(0)
2026–	Saudi Arabia	1	(0)
Medal record
Men's football
Representing Saudi Arabia
Arab Cup U-20
Winner	2021 Egypt
- * Club domestic league appearances and goals as of 8 September 2026 ‡ National team caps and goals as of 31 March 2026

Abdulaziz Al-Aliwa (Arabic: عبد العزيز العليوه; born 11 February 2004) is a Saudi Arabian professional footballer who plays as a winger for Saudi Pro League club Al-Qadsiah and the Saudi Arabia national team.

== Club career ==
Al-Aliwa began his career at the youth team of Al-Nassr. On 8 August 2021, he signed his first professional contract with the club. He made his debut on 31 May 2023 in match to Al-Fateh, and assisted Talisca first goal. On 6 August 2024, Al-Aliwa joined Al-Ettifaq on a one-year loan.

On 27 August 2025, Al-Aliwa joined Al-Kholood on a permanent deal.

== Career statistics ==
=== Club ===
As of 31 May 2025

Club	Season	League		King Cup		Asia		Other		Total	
Club	Season	Apps	Goals	Apps	Goals	Apps	Goals	Apps	Goals	Apps	Goals
Al-Nassr	2022–23	1	0	0	0	—		—		1	0
Al-Nassr	2023–24	9	2	1	0	2	0	5 (Note: Appearance in Arab Club Champions Cup)	1	17	3
Al-Nassr	Total	10	2	1	0	2	0	5	1	18	3
Al-Ettifaq (loan)	2024–25	6	0	0	0	—		5 (Note: Appearance in AGCFF Gulf Club Champions League)	0	11	0
Al-Kholood	2025–26	0	0	0	0	—		—		0	0
Career totals		16	2	1	0	2	0	10	1	29	3

== Honours ==
Al-Nassr

- Arab Club Champions Cup: 2023

Saudi Arabia U-20

- Arab Cup U-20: 2021

Individual

- Saudi Pro League Best Young Talent of the Year: 2025–26
- Saudi Pro League Young Player of the Month: October 2025, December 2025, February 2026, April 2026
