= Abdulrahman Al-Dawsari =

Saudi Arabian footballer (born 1997)

Personal information
- Full name: Abdulrahman Metlaq Al-Dawsari
- Date of birth: 25 September 1997 (age 29)
- Place of birth: Saudi Arabia
- Height: 1.77 m (5 ft 9 1/2 in)
- Position: Midfielder

Team information
- Current team: Al-Kholood
- Number: 39

Senior career*
Years	Team	Apps	(Gls)
2016–2021	Al-Nassr	47	(0)
2017–2018	→ Al-Taawoun (loan)	8	(0)
2021–2023	Al-Faisaly	59	(0)
2023–2025	Al-Qadsiah	35	(1)
2025–	Al-Kholood	39	(2)

International career^{‡}
2015–2017	Saudi Arabia U20		
2017–2018	Saudi Arabia U23		
2017–	Saudi Arabia	4	(0)
- * Club domestic league appearances and goals as of 9 September 2026 ‡ National team caps and goals as of 19 November 2019

Abdulrahman Al-Dawsari (Arabic: عبد الرحمن الدوسري; born 25 September 1997) is a Saudi Arabian professional footballer who currently plays for Al-Kholood and the Saudi Arabia national team.

== Career ==
On 12 September 2023, Al-Dawsari joined Al-Qadsiah.

On 22 August 2025, Al-Dawsari joined Al-Kholood.

== Career statistics ==
=== Club ===
As of 30 May 2024

Club	Season	League			King Cup		Asia		Other		Total	
Club	Season	Division	Apps	Goals	Apps	Goals	Apps	Goals	Apps	Goals	Apps	Goals
Al-Nassr	2016–17	Pro League	12	0	1	0	—		1 (Note: Appearance(s) in Saudi Crown Prince Cup)	0	14	0
Al-Nassr	2017–18	Pro League	3	0	1	0	—		0	0	4	0
Al-Nassr	2018–19	Pro League	10	0	1	0	9	1	0	0	20	1
Al-Nassr	2019–20	Pro League	17	0	3	0	9	0	0	0	29	0
Al-Nassr	2020–21	Pro League	5	0	0	0	1	0	0	0	6	0
Al-Nassr	Club Total		47	0	6	0	19	1	1	0	73	1
Al-Taawoun (loan)	2017–18	Pro League	8	0	1	0	—		1	0	10	0
Al-Faisaly	2021–22	Pro League	26	0	1	0	6	0	1 (Note: Appearance(s) in Saudi Super Cup)	0	34	0
Al-Faisaly	2022–23	First Division League	29	0	—		1	0	—		30	0
Al-Faisaly	2023–24	First Division League	4	0	0	0	—		—		4	0
Al-Faisaly	Club Total		59	0	1	0	7	0	1	0	68	0
Al-Qadsiah	2023–24	First Division League	26	1	0	0	—		—		26	1
Al-Qadsiah	2024–25	Pro League	9	0	2	0	—		—		11	0
Al-Qadsiah	Club Total		35	1	2	0	0	0	0	0	37	1
Al-Kholood	2025–26	Pro League	0	0	0	0	—		—		0	0
Career Total			149	1	10	0	26	1	3	0	188	2

=== International ===
Statistics accurate as of match played 19 November 2019.

Saudi Arabia
Year	Apps	Goals
2017	1	0
2018	0	0
2019	3	0
Total	4	0

== Honours ==
Al-Nassr

- Saudi Pro League: 2018–19
- Saudi Super Cup: 2019, 2020

Al-Qadsiah

- First Division League: 2023–24
