= Al-Kholood Club =

Association football club in Saudi Arabia

Al-Kholood
- Full name: Al-Kholood Football Club
- Nickname: Fakhr Ar Rass (Pride of Ar Rass)
- Founded: March 18, 1970; 56 years ago
- Ground: Al-Hazem Stadium
- Capacity: 8,000
- Owner: Harburg Group
- Chairman: Ben Harburg
- Head coach: Des Buckingham
- League: Saudi Pro League
- 2025–26: Pro League, 14th of 18
- Website: www.alkholoodclub.com
Home colours	Away colours

Al-Kholood Club (Arabic: نادي الخلود, lit. 'Eternity Club') is a Saudi Arabian professional football club based in Ar Rass, that competes in the Saudi Pro League, the top tier of the Saudi football league system.

== History ==
The club was founded in 1970 and spent much of its history competing in the Saudi Second Division League and the Saudi Third Division. In 2024, Al-Kholood secured promotion to the Saudi Pro League for the first time, qualifying for the 2024–25 season.

On 24 July 2025, the club was acquired by businessman Ben Harburg, becoming the first Saudi football club to be fully foreign-owned. Later that year, Al-Kholood recorded their first home victory under Harburg's ownership with a 2–1 win over Damac in the 2025–26 Saudi Pro League on 18 September 2025.

During the 2025–26 King's Cup, Al-Kholood reached the final of the King Cup for the first time. The club finished as runners-up after a 2–1 defeat to Al-Hilal.

== Kits ==
Period	Kit manufacturer	Shirt main sponsor
2022–2023	Zeus Sport	Yelo
2023–2024	KC (In-House)	None
2024–2025	Renown	Yelo
2025–	Kappa	None

== Players ==
As of 9 September 2025

Note: Flags indicate national team as defined under FIFA eligibility rules; some limited exceptions apply. Players may hold more than one non-FIFA nationality.

No.	Pos.	Nation	Player
1	GK	KSA	Hamed Al-Shanqiti (on loan from Ittihad)
5	DF	LTU	Edgaras Utkus
6	MF	ENG	John Buckley
7	DF	KSA	Sultan Al-Shehri
8	MF	GUI	Seydouba Cissé
10	MF	ESP	Iker Kortajarena
11	FW	ESP	Coba da Costa
15	DF	KSA	Ramzi Solan
17	MF	ENG	Adam Berry
18	FW	ARG	Ramiro Enrique
22	FW	FRA	Julien Domingues
23	DF	KSA	Yazan Madani (on loan from Al-Ahli)
24	DF	KSA	Odai Abdulghani
25	DF	GUI	Mansour Camara

No.	Pos.	Nation	Player
26	MF	KSA	Yaseen Al-Zubaidi (on loan from Al-Ahli)
27	FW	KSA	Abdullah Al Ajyan
30	GK	KSA	Mohammed Mazyad
38	DF	SUR	Shaquille Pinas
39	MF	KSA	Abdulrahman Al-Dawsari
41	MF	KSA	Ibrahim Barabaa
47	DF	KSA	Abdulrahman Al-Obaid
48	GK	KSA	Muhannad Al-Yahya
52	MF	KSA	Rakan Jamaan
67	MF	KSA	Mohammed Al-Rashidi
70	MF	KSA	Muhammad Sawan
77	FW	CMR	Antoin Essomba
99	FW	BRA	Guga

=== Out on loan ===
Note: Flags indicate national team as defined under FIFA eligibility rules; some limited exceptions apply. Players may hold more than one non-FIFA nationality.

No.	Pos.	Nation	Player
21	DF	KSA	Rashid Al-Mutairi (at Al-Anwar)

== Honours ==
- King's Cup
  - Runners-up (1): 2025–26

== Coaching staff ==
Position	Staff
Head coach	(England) Des Buckingham
Assistant coach	(Japan) Hiroshi Miyazawa (Saudi Arabia) Saad Al-Subaie
Goalkeeper coach	(Spain) Juanma Cruz
Fitness coach	(Spain) Julian Serrano
Match analyst	(Netherlands) Tim Te Riele
Team doctor	(Saudi Arabia) Mazen Al-Shehri
Physiotherapist	(Saudi Arabia) Abdullah Al-Harbi
Masseur	(Saudi Arabia) Sultan Mazyad
Performance Manager	(Saudi Arabia) Mohammed Al-Mazrou

== See also ==
- List of football clubs in Saudi Arabia
