= Ar Rass =

Ar Rass الرس
- City
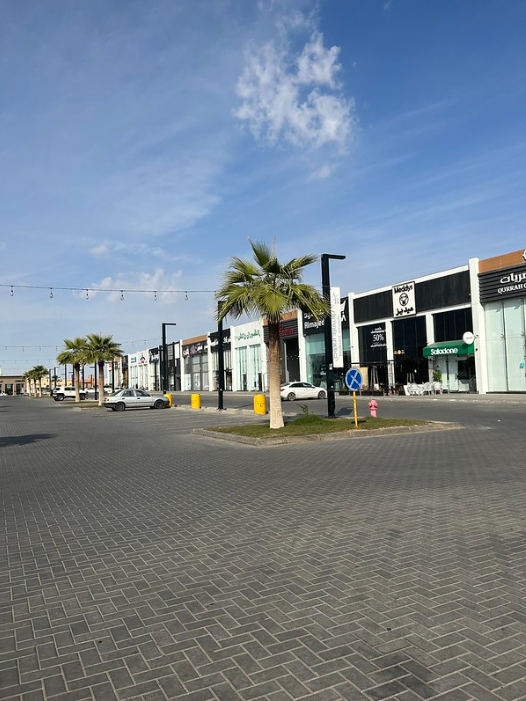

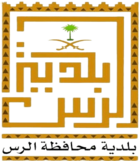

- Location within Saudi Arabia
- Coordinates: 25°52′N 43°30′E
- Country: Saudi Arabia
- Province: Al-Qassim Province

Government
  - Governor: Saud bin Hussein Al-Assaf

Area
  - City: 2,651 km^{2} (1,024 sq mi)
- Elevation: 691 m (2,267 ft)

Population (Census 2022)
  - City: 121,359
  - Density: 45.78/km^{2} (118.6/sq mi)
  - Urban: 107,902
- Time zone: UTC+3 (AST)
- Postal code: 51921
- Area code: 016333
- Geocode: 108435
- ISO 3166 code: SA-05

Rass (also spelled Ar Rass, or Al-Ras; Arabic: الرس) is a Saudi Arabian City, located in Al-Qassim Province. It lies southwest of Buraidah, the capital of the province and north of Riyadh, the national capital.

Rass is the largest city in Al-Qassim province by area and third largest by population. Rass is Arabic for "an old well", and it was mentioned in a poem of Hassan Bin Thabit, the poet who was a companion (Sahaba) of the Islamic prophet, Muhammad.

The city is ruled by the Al Assaf family. It has 19 official sub-governorates, and is surrounded by around two hundred villages, and Bedouin settlements, mainly on its southern and western sides. and al-Rass is a historical city that was a resource for the Arab tribes in the peninsula, and most of Najd, especially Qassim, was inhabited by the tribes of Bani Asad, which were left to be replaced by other tribes. He was the first to inhabit the Al-Rass after the Asadites, the Banu Tamim, who moved to it from Ashikar, and the Banu Lam and their most tribes followed them, the Dhafir tribe and Al-Fadoul tribe, along with the Al Katheer and Al Mughayra family.

== Location ==
Ibn Manzur (Lisan al-Arab 6/98) says: (Al-Ras and Al-Risse are two valleys in Najd or two places, and it was said: They are two well-known waters in the Arab countries, and Al-Rass is the name of a valley in the words of Zuhair bin Abi Salma:

They gave birth to a firstborn, and took their souls with magicians ... for they and Wadi Al-Rass are like hands in the mouth And Yaqut al-Hamwi (Mu'jam al-Buldan 3/43) says al-Rass and al-Rassis ... (are) two valleys in Najd, or two places This was mentioned by Ibn Bleehed (Sahih al-Akhbar 4/226). And Al-Asma'i said: Ras Lubna belongs to Banu A'ya, the kinsmen of Hammas.

Ibn al-Saket says: Rass is a valley near Aqil, with palm trees in it. Perhaps he was talking about it in his time, as it was in Jahiliyyah. Al-Rass was water that was brought back by the donkeys of the beast and its cows, and from that it became clear that Al-Rass was an ancient city that during the era of the Jahiliyyah was a source of water for the tribes, then when Islam came, it entered construction like others, since Ibn al-Skeet lived in the third century AH, no doubt That he transmitted his words from others who presented him. As mentioned in the Saudi City Atlas, the total area of Al-Rass Governorate is estimated in hectares in 1407 AH (700050) hectares, equivalent to (70000,500) square kilometers. At the present time, and after the governorate expanded thanks to the urban renaissance and the large number of migrations coming from the neighboring villages and desertions, the length of the governorate reached about 12 kilometers by 10 kilometers (120 square kilometers).

== Geography ==
Rass has a typical Nejdi terrain, with sand dunes surrounding the town's sides, except for the western and southern sides, which are occupied by Bedouin settlements. The Wadi al-Rummah (Rumma Valley) crosses the city from its southern side to its north-eastern side. There are several medium-height plateaus, and low-height mountains surrounding the town, mainly on the southern side, which are called "Jebel Algoshie" by locals. There are several old ruins of a place by the name of "Shinanah". These were old fortifications used in battles between Al-Saud and Al-Rashid

=== Climate ===
The town of Rass has a typical desert climate, known for its cold winters and hot and aneroid summers, with low humidity. The average temperature during winter is between -3° and 21°C. June, July, August, and September are the hottest months. In summers the degree could reach extreme levels (between 39° and 50°).

== Sport ==
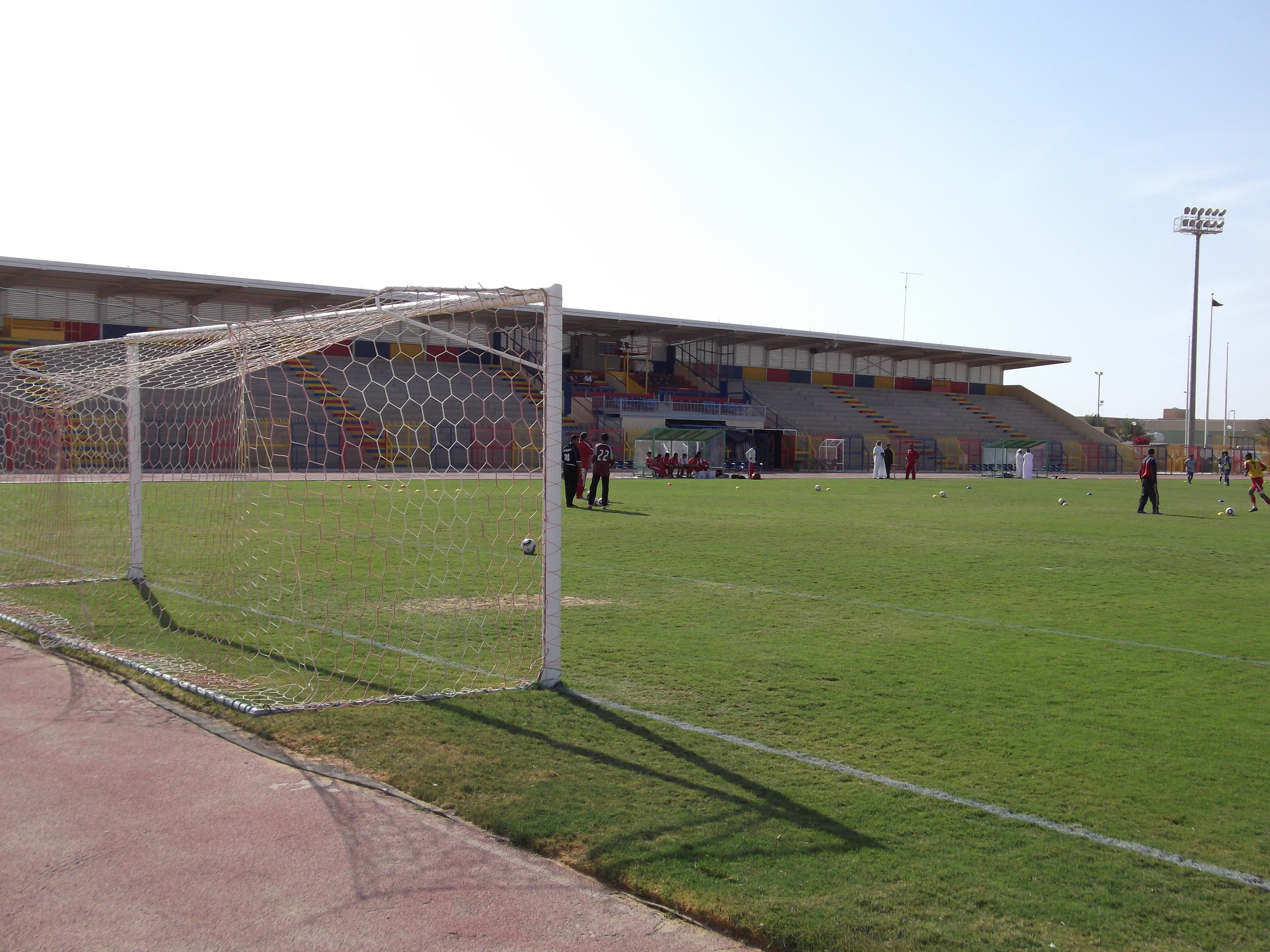
Al-Hazem Club Stadium

The city's main clubs are Al-Hazem and Al-Kholood, both representing it in football.

== Foundation ==
After the Arab tribes left Najd, among them the tribes of Bani Asad that inhabited the greater part of Qassim, other tribes took their place, and it was one of the Arab tribes that settled in Najd and the tribes of Bani Tamim or Hamidan were famous and those who moved from Ashikar to Al-Rass for work and trade as they served the province in the past And to our present time, as well as the Bani Lam, who have gained influence and dominance over most of the countries of Najd, and one of the most famous tribes of Bani Lam was the Zafir tribe. The people who lived in Alya, Najd and their outskirts, Al-Qassim, the tribes of curiosity, and the many families of Al Mughira. In the tenth century onwards, these valleys descended from Najd to Iraq and were replaced by the Anza tribes, which had their money from abundance and power and influence for a long time. And he builds some houses when he gets tired of the life of the desert, and another part works in agriculture and grows the land, and it happened between the Anza tribes and the Dafir tribes for a number of days and in the middle of the tenth century. From the migration, where the maid came to life again, after years and a long time. And groups of Arabs began to return to him with the intention of settling, as they established dwellings of mud in it, which soon formed a small village, and that was about the year 950 AH after they left the town of Ishaqir, one of the villages of al-Tashm, which was at that time one of the major lands of Najd, as was mentioned in the words of the Sheikh. Historian Ibrahim bin Saleh bin Isa, who said: (The well-known family of Saqiyyah left the country of Ashqir in the year approximately nine hundred and fifty and went to Al-Qassim, and they settled in Al-Rass, and it was in ruins without housing. They lived in it and extended it to agriculture ... etc.) and they built their homes, and their commercial contacts were in the town of Onaizah, which was in that era a source for spending their needs and household needs, which made them get acquainted with one of its settlers who used to do trade and he was called Abu Al-Hussain, whose name is Muhammad bin Ali from the Mahfouz family of Ajman Those who belong to Mukhir bin Yam from Hamadan al-Qahtani, and the friendship between him and the Saki family became stronger and they exchanged visits.
