= Al-Hazem Club Stadium =

Multi-use stadium in Ar Rass, Saudi Arabia

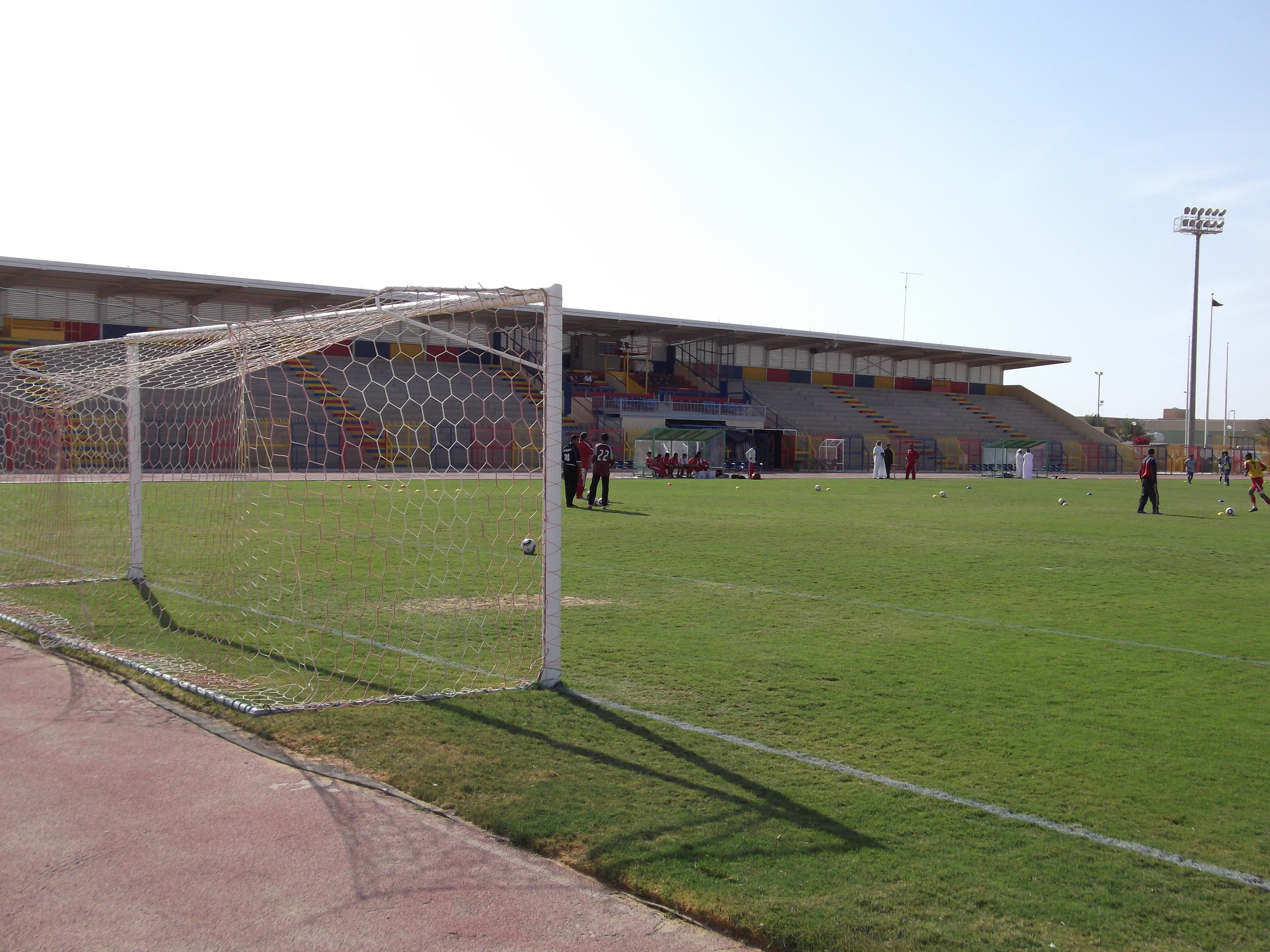
- Interactive map of Al-Hazem Club Stadium
- Full name: Al-Hazem Club Stadium
- Location: Ar Rass, Saudi Arabia
- Coordinates: 25°51′44.0″N 43°30′08.5″E
- Owner: Ministry of Sport
- Capacity: 8,000
- Surface: Grass

Construction
- Opened: 1982
- Cost: 120mSAR

Tenants
- Al-Hazem (1980–present); Al-Kholood (1980–present)

Al-Hazem Club Stadium is a multi-use stadium in Ar Rass, Saudi Arabia. It is currently used mostly for football matches.

== See also ==
List of football stadiums in Saudi Arabia
