= 2023–24 Al-Ittihad Club season =

Al-Ittihad
2023–24 season
- President: Anmar Al-Hailiy
- Manager: Nuno Espírito Santo (until 7 November); Marcelo Gallardo (from 18 November)
- Stadium: King Abdullah Sports City
- Pro League: 5th
- King Cup: Semi-finals (knocked out by Al-Hilal)
- Champions League: Quarter-finals (knocked out by Al-Hilal)
- Arab Club Champions Cup: Quarter-finals (knocked out by Al-Hilal)
- Super Cup: Runners-up (knocked out by Al-Hilal)
- FIFA Club World Cup: Second round (knocked out by Al Ahly)
- Top goalscorer: League: Abderrazak Hamdallah (19); All: Abderrazak Hamdallah (30)
- Highest home attendance: 55,764 (vs. Al-Ahli, 6 October 2023)
- Lowest home attendance: 3,650 (vs. Al-Raed, 23 December 2023)
- Average home league attendance: 17,970
Home colours	Away colours	Third colours

The 2023–24 season was Al-Ittihad's 48th consecutive season in the top flight of Saudi football and 96th year in existence as a football club. The club participated in the Pro League, the King Cup, the AFC Champions League, the Arab Club Champions Cup, the Super Cup and the FIFA Club World Cup.

The season covers the period from 1 July 2023 to 30 June 2024.

This season saw the club signed the Frenchman and former Ballon d'Or holder Karim Benzema, who is considered as one of the best strikers of all time. He signed a contract for three years having him stay until 2026.

== Players ==
=== Squad information ===
As of 1 February 2024

Note: Flags indicate national team as defined under FIFA eligibility rules; some limited exceptions apply. Players may hold more than one non-FIFA nationality.

No.	Pos.	Nation	Player
1	GK	KSA	Abdullah Al-Mayouf
4	DF	KSA	Omar Hawsawi
5	DF	ITA	Luiz Felipe
6	MF	KSA	Sultan Al-Farhan
7	MF	FRA	N'Golo Kanté
8	MF	BRA	Fabinho
9	FW	FRA	Karim Benzema
11	MF	POR	Jota
12	DF	KSA	Zakaria Hawsawi
13	DF	KSA	Muhannad Al-Shanqeeti
14	MF	KSA	Awad Al-Nashri
15	DF	KSA	Hassan Kadesh
16	MF	KSA	Faisal Al-Ghamdi
17	MF	KSA	Marwan Al-Sahafi
19	DF	KSA	Turki Al-Jaadi
20	DF	KSA	Ahmed Sharahili
21	GK	KSA	Abdullah Al-Jadaani
22	MF	KSA	Hammam Al-Hammami

No.	Pos.	Nation	Player
25	DF	KSA	Suwailem Al-Menhali
26	DF	EGY	Ahmed Hegazi (captain)
27	MF	KSA	Ahmed Al-Ghamdi (on loan from Al-Ettifaq)
28	DF	KSA	Ahmed Bamsaud
29	MF	KSA	Farhah Al-Shammrani
30	DF	KSA	Saad Al Mousa (on loan from Al-Ettifaq)
33	DF	KSA	Madallah Al-Olayan
34	GK	BRA	Marcelo Grohe
35	GK	KSA	Mohammed Al-Mahasneh
37	DF	KSA	Fawaz Al-Sqoor
51	GK	KSA	Faisal Al-Eisa
52	FW	KSA	Talal Haji
77	MF	KSA	Saleh Al-Amri
80	MF	KSA	Hamed Al-Ghamdi (on loan from Al-Ettifaq)
88	GK	KSA	Osama Al-Mermesh
90	FW	BRA	Romarinho
97	MF	KSA	Salem Ayyash
99	FW	MAR	Abderrazak Hamdallah

=== Out on loan ===
Note: Flags indicate national team as defined under FIFA eligibility rules; some limited exceptions apply. Players may hold more than one non-FIFA nationality.

No.	Pos.	Nation	Player
22	GK	KSA	Saleh Al-Ohaymid (at Al-Taawoun until 30 June 2024)
35	MF	KSA	Hussain Al-Eisa (at Al-Kholood until 30 June 2023)
41	GK	KSA	Raghdan Matri (at Al-Kholood until 30 June 2024)
—	GK	KSA	Malek Tolah (at Al-Zulfi until 30 June 2024)
—	DF	KSA	Basil Al-Hedaif (at Jeddah until 30 June 2024)
—	DF	KSA	Hassan Al-Asmari (at Al-Batin until 30 June 2024)

No.	Pos.	Nation	Player
—	DF	KSA	Abdulelah Al-Shehri (at Al-Rawdhah until 30 June 2024)
—	MF	KSA	Al Mutasim Seddiq (at Al-Kholood until 30 June 2024)
—	MF	KSA	Abdulaziz Al-Bishi (at Damac until 30 June 2024)
—	MF	KSA	Abdulelah Hawsawi (at Al-Khaleej until 30 June 2024)
—	MF	KSA	Omar Al-Jadani (at Al-Ain until 30 June 2024)
—	FW	KSA	Abdulaziz Al-Hassani (at Al-Entesar until 30 June 2024)

== Transfers and loans ==
=== Transfers in ===
Entry date	Position	No.	Player	From club	Fee	Ref.
30 June 2023	GK	22	(Saudi Arabia) Saleh Al-Ohaymid	(Saudi Arabia) Al-Kholood	End of loan	
30 June 2023	GK	41	(Saudi Arabia) Raghdan Matri	(Saudi Arabia) Al-Bukiryah	End of loan	
30 June 2023	GK	–	(Saudi Arabia) Mohammed Abo Asidah	(Saudi Arabia) Wej	End of loan	
30 June 2023	GK	–	(Saudi Arabia) Malek Tolah	(Saudi Arabia) Al-Kholood	End of loan	
30 June 2023	DF	4	(Saudi Arabia) Ziyad Al-Sahafi	(Saudi Arabia) Al-Taawoun	End of loan	
30 June 2023	DF	23	(Saudi Arabia) Mohammed Al-Oufi	(Saudi Arabia) Al-Adalah	End of loan	
30 June 2023	DF	25	(Saudi Arabia) Naif Asiri	(Saudi Arabia) Al-Lewaa	End of loan	
30 June 2023	DF	32	(Saudi Arabia) Hazim Al-Zahrani	(Saudi Arabia) Ohod	End of loan	
30 June 2023	DF	–	(Saudi Arabia) Aseel Abed	(Saudi Arabia) Al-Okhdood	End of loan	
30 June 2023	DF	–	(Saudi Arabia) Hassan Al-Asmari	(Saudi Arabia) Najran	End of loan	
30 June 2023	DF	–	(Saudi Arabia) Basil Al-Hedaif	(Saudi Arabia) Al-Bukiryah	End of loan	
30 June 2023	MF	6	(Saudi Arabia) Khaled Al-Samiri	(Saudi Arabia) Al-Khaleej	End of loan	
30 June 2023	MF	15	(Saudi Arabia) Mohammed Sawaan	(Saudi Arabia) Al-Kholood	End of loan	
30 June 2023	MF	29	(Saudi Arabia) Ahmed Bahusayn	(Saudi Arabia) Hajer	End of loan	
30 June 2023	MF	35	(Saudi Arabia) Hussain Al-Eisa	(Saudi Arabia) Hajer	End of loan	
30 June 2023	MF	–	(Saudi Arabia) Abdulaziz Al-Dhuwayhi	(Saudi Arabia) Jeddah	End of loan	
30 June 2023	MF	–	(Saudi Arabia) Abdulelah Hawsawi	(Saudi Arabia) Jeddah	End of loan	
30 June 2023	MF	–	(Saudi Arabia) Meshal Sani	(Saudi Arabia) Al-Bukiryah	End of loan	
30 June 2023	FW	–	(Saudi Arabia) Abdulaziz Al-Hassani	(Saudi Arabia) Wej	End of loan	
1 July 2023	DF	12	(Saudi Arabia) Zakaria Hawsawi	(Saudi Arabia) Ohod	$1,200,000	
1 July 2023	MF	7	(France) N'Golo Kanté	(England) Chelsea	Free	
1 July 2023	FW	9	(France) Karim Benzema	(Spain) Real Madrid	Free	
3 July 2023	MF	11	(Portugal) Jota	(Scotland) Celtic	$31,750,000	
11 July 2023	MF	6	(Saudi Arabia) Sultan Al-Farhan	(Saudi Arabia) Al-Raed	Free	
22 July 2023	MF	77	(Saudi Arabia) Saleh Al-Amri	(Saudi Arabia) Abha	$2,134,000	
31 July 2023	MF	8	(Brazil) Fabinho	(England) Liverpool	$51,000,000	
31 August 2023	DF	15	(Saudi Arabia) Hassan Kadesh	(Saudi Arabia) Al-Taawoun	$16,000,000	
3 September 2023	GK	1	(Saudi Arabia) Abdullah Al-Mayouf	(Saudi Arabia) Al-Hilal	Undisclosed	
7 September 2023	DF	5	(Italy) Luiz Felipe	(Spain) Real Betis	$26,700,000	
7 September 2023	MF	16	(Saudi Arabia) Faisal Al-Ghamdi	(Saudi Arabia) Al-Ettifaq	$12,500,000	
30 January 2024	GK	35	(Saudi Arabia) Mohammed Al-Mahasneh	(Saudi Arabia) Damac	$2,400,000	
31 January 2024	DF	37	(Saudi Arabia) Fawaz Al-Sqoor	(Saudi Arabia) Al-Shabab	$3,000,000	

=== Loans in ===
Start date	End date	Position	No.	Player	From club	Fee	Ref.
17 January 2024	End of season	DF	30	(Saudi Arabia) Saad Al Mousa	(Saudi Arabia) Al-Ettifaq	None	
28 January 2024	End of season	MF	27	(Saudi Arabia) Ahmed Al-Ghamdi	(Saudi Arabia) Al-Ettifaq	None	
30 January 2024	End of season	MF	80	(Saudi Arabia) Hamed Al-Ghamdi	(Saudi Arabia) Al-Ettifaq	None	

=== Transfers out ===
Exit date	Position	No.	Player	To club	Fee	Ref.
30 June 2023	DF	12	(Saudi Arabia) Zakaria Hawsawi	(Saudi Arabia) Ohod	End of loan	
30 June 2023	MF	17	(Angola) Hélder Costa	(England) Leeds United	End of loan	
1 July 2023	MF	15	(Saudi Arabia) Mohammed Sawaan	(Saudi Arabia) Al-Kholood	Free	
5 July 2023	MF	29	(Saudi Arabia) Ahmed Bahusayn	(Saudi Arabia) Al-Taawoun	Free	
9 July 2023	MF	6	(Saudi Arabia) Khaled Al-Samiri	(Saudi Arabia) Al-Khaleej	Free	
19 July 2023	GK	—	(Saudi Arabia) Mohammed Abo Asidah	(Saudi Arabia) Al-Sahel	Free	
19 July 2023	MF	19	(Brazil) Bruno Henrique	(Brazil) Internacional	Free	
28 July 2023	DF	23	(Saudi Arabia) Mohammed Al-Oufi	(Saudi Arabia) Abha	Free	
1 August 2023	MF	28	(Saudi Arabia) Essam Al-Muwallad	(Saudi Arabia) Al-Ain	Free	
1 August 2023	MF	—	(Saudi Arabia) Abdulaziz Al-Dhuwayhi	(Saudi Arabia) Jeddah	Free	
2 August 2023	MF	16	(Saudi Arabia) Abdulkareem Al-Maghrabi	(Saudi Arabia) Hajer	Free	
10 August 2023	FW	80	(Saudi Arabia) Mohammed Al-Saiari	(Saudi Arabia) Al-Qadsiah	Undisclosed	
4 September 2023	MF	3	(Egypt) Tarek Hamed	(Saudi Arabia) Damac	Free	
7 September 2023	FW	—	(Saudi Arabia) Thamer Al-Khaibari	(Saudi Arabia) Al-Ettifaq	Free	
8 September 2023	DF	27	(Saudi Arabia) Hamdan Al-Shamrani	(Saudi Arabia) Al-Ettifaq	Free	
13 September 2023	DF	38	(Saudi Arabia) Sultan Al-Sulayli	(Saudi Arabia) Al-Najma	Free	
16 September 2023	DF	32	(Saudi Arabia) Hazim Al-Zahrani	(Saudi Arabia) Al-Safa	Free	
16 September 2023	DF	—	(Saudi Arabia) Aseel Abed	(Saudi Arabia) Al-Safa	Free	
20 September 2023	MF	—	(Saudi Arabia) Younis Abdulwahed	(Saudi Arabia) Al-Zulfi	Free	
21 September 2023	MF	—	(Saudi Arabia) Anas Al-Sharif	(Saudi Arabia) Al-Ansar	Free	
23 January 2024	MF	–	(Saudi Arabia) Meshal Sani	(Saudi Arabia) Al-Bukiryah	Free	
31 January 2024	GK	–	(Saudi Arabia) Malek Tolah	(Saudi Arabia) Ohod	Free	
31 January 2024	DF	—	(Saudi Arabia) Salem Baryan	(Saudi Arabia) Jeddah	Free	
16 February 2024	MF	10	(Brazil) Igor Coronado	(Brazil) Corinthians	Free	

=== Loans out ===
Start date	End date	Position	No.	Player	To club	Fee	Ref.
2 July 2023	End of season	MF	—	(Saudi Arabia) Abdulelah Hawsawi	(Saudi Arabia) Al-Khaleej	None	
11 July 2023	End of season	MF	11	(Saudi Arabia) Abdulaziz Al-Bishi	(Saudi Arabia) Damac	None	
21 July 2023	End of season	GK	41	(Saudi Arabia) Raghdan Matri	(Saudi Arabia) Al-Kholood	None	
27 July 2023	30 January 2024	GK	–	(Saudi Arabia) Malek Tolah	(Saudi Arabia) Al-Zulfi	None	
1 August 2023	End of season	MF	35	(Saudi Arabia) Hussain Al-Eisa	(Saudi Arabia) Al-Kholood	None	
9 August 2023	8 September 2023	DF	27	(Saudi Arabia) Hamdan Al-Shamrani	(Saudi Arabia) Al-Ettifaq	None	
2 September 2023	30 January 2024	DF	15	(Saudi Arabia) Abdulelah Al-Shehri	(Saudi Arabia) Al-Rawdhah	None	
7 September 2023	End of season	GK	22	(Saudi Arabia) Saleh Al-Ohaymid	(Saudi Arabia) Al-Taawoun	None	
7 September 2023	End of season	DF	4	(Saudi Arabia) Ziyad Al-Sahafi	(Saudi Arabia) Abha	None	
11 September 2023	End of season	DF	–	(Saudi Arabia) Hassan Al-Asmari	(Saudi Arabia) Al-Batin	None	
12 September 2023	End of season	DF	–	(Saudi Arabia) Basil Al-Hedaif	(Saudi Arabia) Jeddah	None	
12 September 2023	End of season	MF	–	(Saudi Arabia) Al Mutasim Seddiq	(Saudi Arabia) Al-Kholood	None	
12 September 2023	End of season	MF	–	(Saudi Arabia) Omar Al-Jadani	(Saudi Arabia) Al-Ain	None	
1 October 2023	End of season	FW	–	(Saudi Arabia) Abdulaziz Al-Hassani	(Saudi Arabia) Al-Entesar	None	
17 January 2024	End of season	MF	24	(Saudi Arabia) Abdulrahman Al-Aboud	(Saudi Arabia) Al-Ettifaq	None	
17 January 2024	End of season	FW	70	(Saudi Arabia) Haroune Camara	(Saudi Arabia) Al-Ettifaq	None	
31 January 2024	End of season	DF	15	(Saudi Arabia) Abdulelah Al-Shehri	(Saudi Arabia) Mudhar	None	

== Competitions ==
=== Overview ===
Competition	Record							
Competition	Pld	W	D	L	GF	GA	GD	Win %
Pro League	34	16	6	12	63	54	+9	47.06
King Cup	4	2	1	1	9	3	+6	50.00
Champions League	10	6	1	3	13	9	+4	60.00
Arab Club Champions Cup	4	3	0	1	6	5	+1	75.00
Super Cup	2	1	0	1	3	5	−2	50.00
FIFA Club World Cup	2	1	0	1	4	3	+1	50.00
Total	56	29	8	19	98	79	+19	51.79

Updated to match played 27 May 2024
Source: Competitions

=== Pro League ===
==== League table ====
Pos	Team	Pld	W	D	L	GF	GA	GD	Pts	Qualification or relegation
3	Al-Ahli	34	19	8	7	67	35	+32	65	Qualification for AFC Champions League Elite league stage
4	Al-Taawoun	34	16	11	7	51	35	+16	59	Qualification for AFC Champions League Two group stage
5	Al-Ittihad	34	16	6	12	63	54	+9	54	
6	Al-Ettifaq	34	12	12	10	43	34	+9	48	Qualification for the AGCFF Gulf Club Champions League group stage
7	Al-Fateh	34	12	9	13	57	55	+2	45	

Source: SPL
Rules for classification: 1) Points; 2) Head-to-head points; 3) Head-to-head goal difference; 4) Total goal difference; 5) Total goals scored; 6) Fair-play points
(Note: Head-to-head record is used only after all the matches between the teams in question have been played).

==== Results summary ====
Overall								Home						Away					
Pld	W	D	L	GF	GA	GD	Pts	W	D	L	GF	GA	GD	W	D	L	GF	GA	GD
34	16	6	12	63	54	+9	54	9	2	6	34	32	+2	7	4	6	29	22	+7

Last updated: 27 May 2024.
Source: Saudi Pro League

==== Results by round ====
Round	1	2	3	4	5	6	7	8	9	10	11	12	13	14	15	16	17	18	19	20	21	22	23	24	25	26	27	28	29	30	31	32	33	34
Ground	A	H	A	A	H	A	H	A	H	A	H	A	H	A	H	A	H	H	A	H	H	A	H	A	H	A	H	A	H	A	H	A	H	A
Result	W	W	W	W	L	W	W	D	L	D	D	L	W	D	W	L	L	L	W	W	W	L	W	W	W	L	D	W	L	L	L	D	W	L
Position	1	1	1	1	3	2	1	2	4	5	6	6	5	4	4	5	5	6	5	5	5	5	4	4	4	4	4	4	5	5	5	5	5	5

Updated to match(es) played on 27 May 2024. Source: Saudi Pro League
A = Away; H = Home; W = Win; D = Draw; L = Loss

==== Matches ====
All times are local, AST (UTC+3).

Win Draw Loss Postponed

14 August 2023 1	Al-Raed	0–3	Al-Ittihad	Buraidah
18:00		Report	Hamdallah 58'; Coronado 73', 79'	Stadium: King Abdullah Sport City Stadium; Attendance: 4,149; Referee: Luís Godinho (Portugal)

19 August 2023 2	Al-Ittihad	2–0	Al-Tai	Jeddah
21:00	O. Hawsawi (yellow card) 34'; Hamdallah 54'; Coronado (yellow card) 75'; Al-Amri 90'	Report	Semedo (yellow card) 25'; Qassem (yellow card) 90+4'	Stadium: Prince Abdullah Al Faisal Stadium; Attendance: 21,460; Referee: César Arturo Ramos (Mexico)

24 August 2023 3	Al-Riyadh	0–4	Al-Ittihad	Riyadh
21:00	Kurdi (yellow card) 45+1'; Al-Khaibari (yellow card) 64'; A. Al-Dossari (yellow card) 74'	Report	Benzema 17'; Hamdallah 25' (pen.), 45+10'; Al-Shanqeeti (yellow card) 87'; Al-Amri 90+3'	Stadium: Prince Faisal bin Fahd Stadium; Attendance: 8,618; Referee: Iván Barton (El Salvador)

28 August 2023 4	Al-Wehda	0–3	Al-Ittihad	Mecca
21:00	Noor (yellow card) 45+5'; Anselmo (yellow card) 45+6'	Report	Hamdallah (yellow card) 61'; Romarinho 63'; Jota 67'; Coronado 73'	Stadium: King Abdul Aziz Stadium; Attendance: 9,500; Referee: Facundo Tello (Argentina)

1 September 2023 5	Al-Ittihad	3–4	Al-Hilal	Jeddah
21:00	Romarinho 16'; Benzema 38'; O. Hawsawi (yellow card) 41'; Hamdallah 45+8'; Bamsaud (yellow card) 63'; Al-Amri (yellow card) 90+12'	Report	Mitrović 20', 60', 65' (pen.); S. Al-Dawsari 71'; Al-Bulaihi (yellow card) 88'	Stadium: Prince Abdullah Al Faisal Stadium; Attendance: 23,742; Referee: Mario Escobar (Guatemala)

14 September 2023 6	Al-Okhdood	0–1	Al-Ittihad	Najran
18:00	Al-Muwallad (yellow card) 69'	Report	Benzema 72'	Stadium: Prince Hathloul bin Abdul Aziz Sports City; Attendance: 6,971; Referee: Piero Maza (Chile)

21 September 2023 7	Al-Ittihad	2–1	Al-Fateh	Jeddah
21:00	Kadesh (yellow card) 12'; Romarinho 38', (yellow card) 53'; Kanté 45+1'; Al-Olayan (yellow card) 90+5'	Report	Al-Hassan (yellow card) 9'; Saâdane 30', (yellow card) 67'; Al-Saeed (yellow card) 82'	Stadium: Prince Abdullah Al Faisal Stadium; Attendance: 15,209; Referee: Daniele Orsato (Italy)

29 September 2023 8	Al-Fayha	0–0	Al-Ittihad	Riyadh
18:00	Al-Baqawi (yellow card) 70'	Report	Hamdallah (yellow card) 79'; Kadesh (yellow card) 86'	Stadium: King Fahd International Stadium; Attendance: 10,081; Referee: Bastian Dankert (Germany)

6 October 2023 9	Al-Ittihad	0–1	Al-Ahli	Jeddah
21:00	Fabinho (yellow card) 35'; Coronado (yellow card) 75'	Report	Kessié 31'; Mendy (yellow card) 61'; Mahrez (yellow card) 70'; Veiga (yellow card) 86'; Al-Johani (yellow card) 90+3'	Stadium: King Abdullah Sports City; Attendance: 55,764; Referee: Danny Makkelie (Netherlands)

20 October 2023 10	Al-Taawoun	1–1	Al-Ittihad	Buraidah
18:00	Benzema 26' (o.g.); Flávio (yellow card) 90+1'	Report	Benzema 22'; Hamdallah (yellow card) 38'; Felipe (yellow card) 90+1'	Stadium: King Abdullah Sport City Stadium; Attendance: 9,487; Referee: Georgi Kabakov (Bulgaria)

26 October 2023 11	Al-Ittihad	2–2	Al-Hazem	Jeddah
21:00	Benzema 26'; Al-Farhan (yellow card) 49'; Kadesh 81'; Al-Ghamdi (yellow card) 90+5'	Report	Abousaban (yellow card) 58'; Al-Thani 63'; Viana (yellow card) 74'; Selemani 86'	Stadium: Prince Abdullah Al Faisal Stadium; Attendance: 12,113; Referee: Alexis Herrera (Venezuela)

3 November 2023 12	Al-Shabab	1–0	Al-Ittihad	Riyadh
21:00	Carlos 14'; Cuéllar (yellow card) 45+2'; Banega (yellow card) 61'; Al-Qahtani (yellow card) 73'; Al-Muwallad (yellow card) 83'; Saïss (yellow card) 89'	Report		Stadium: King Fahd International Stadium; Attendance: 11,476; Referee: Nicolás Ramírez (Argentina)

10 November 2023 13	Al-Ittihad	4–2	Abha	Jeddah
21:00	Benzema 38' (pen.), 67', 69'; Coronado 54'; Kadesh (yellow card) 65'; Al-Sahafi (yellow card) 90+3'	Report	Natiq (yellow card) 41'; Toko Ekambi 51'; Al-Jumayah 85'	Stadium: Prince Abdullah Al Faisal Stadium; Attendance: 16,835; Referee: Kevin Ortega (Peru)

24 November 2023 14	Al-Ettifaq	1–1	Al-Ittihad	Dammam
18:00	Wijnaldum 41'	Report	Hamdallah 54'; Felipe (yellow card) 73'	Stadium: Al-Ettifaq Club Stadium; Attendance: 12,334; Referee: Tamás Bognár (Hungary)

30 November 2023 15	Al-Ittihad	4–2	Al-Khaleej	Mecca
21:00	Coronado 9'; Benzema 29' (pen.); O. Hawsawi (yellow card) 52'; Al-Ghamdi (yellow card) 61'; Hamdallah 65' (pen.); Z. Hawsawi 74'	Report	Narey 45' (pen.); Al Hamsal (yellow card) 68'; Al-Torais 90'	Stadium: King Abdul Aziz Stadium; Attendance: 9,727; Referee: Mamdouh Al Shahdan

7 December 2023 16	Damac	3–1	Al-Ittihad	Abha
18:00	Nkoudou 12', 45+7'; S. Hawsawi (yellow card) 22'; Grohe 46' (o.g.)	Report	Hamdallah 45+3' (pen.), (yellow card) 68'; Al-Shamrani (yellow card) 75'; Kadesh (yellow card) 90+2'	Stadium: Prince Sultan bin Abdul Aziz Stadium; Attendance: 14,556; Referee: Saíd Martínez (Honduras)

23 December 2023 18	Al-Ittihad	1–3	Al-Raed	Mecca
21:00	Al-Olayan (red card) 12'; Romarinho 25'; Camara (yellow card) 88'; Al-Amri (yellow card) 90+7'	Report	El Berkaoui 22', 72'; Al-Subaie (yellow card) 45+1'; M. Al-Dossari 90'	Stadium: King Abdul Aziz Stadium; Attendance: 3,650; Referee: Sami Al-Jires

26 December 2023 17	Al-Ittihad	2–5	Al-Nassr	Jeddah
21:00	Hamdallah 14', 51', (yellow card) 47'; Al-Ghamdi (yellow card) 28'; Kanté (yellow card) 40'; Fabinho (yellow card) 60' (yellow-red card) 66'	Report	Ronaldo 19' (pen.), 68' (pen.); Fofana (yellow card) 30'; Talisca 38'; Telles (yellow card) 45+11'; Laporte (yellow card) 47'; Lajami (yellow card) 70'; Mané 75', 82'	Stadium: Prince Abdullah Al Faisal Stadium; Attendance: 20,332; Referee: Anastasios Sidiropoulos (Greece)

7 February 2024 19	Al-Tai	0–3	Al-Ittihad	Ha'il
21:00	Bauer (yellow card) 15'; Roco (yellow card) 51'; Al-Omari (yellow card) 62'	Report	Hamdallah 8'; F. Al-Ghamdi 42'; Al-Farhan (yellow card) 45'; A. Al-Ghamdi (yellow card) 70'; Romarinho 87'	Stadium: Prince Abdul Aziz bin Musa'ed Stadium; Attendance: 4,814; Referee: Sergei Karasev (Russia)

18 February 2024 20	Al-Ittihad	2–0	Al-Riyadh	Jeddah
20:00	Hamdallah 12', 90+7'; F. Al-Ghamdi (yellow card) 49'	Report	Al-Shuwayyi (yellow card) 82'; Al Aqeel (yellow card) 90+3'	Stadium: Prince Abdullah Al Faisal Stadium; Attendance: 11,864; Referee: Nazareno Arasa (Argentina)

26 February 2024 21	Al-Ittihad	2–1	Al-Wehda	Jeddah
20:00	Hamdallah 84' (pen.), 90+4', (yellow card) 90+6'; Al Mousa (red card) 90'	Report	Ighalo 35'; Bukhari (yellow card) 37'; Makki (yellow card) 45+10'; Noor (yellow card) 58'; El Yamiq (yellow card) 82'	Stadium: King Abdullah Sports City; Attendance: 38,221; Referee: Kevin Ortega (Peru)

1 March 2024 22	Al-Hilal	3–1	Al-Ittihad	Riyadh
20:00	Al-Shehri 39', (yellow card) 50'; Malcom 59'; Abdulhamid 67'; Neves (yellow card) 77'	Report	Kanté 12'; Fabinho (yellow card) 35'; Al-Sahafi (yellow card) 47'; Hegazi (yellow card) 50'	Stadium: Kingdom Arena; Attendance: 17,210; Referee: Iván Barton (El Salvador)

8 March 2024 23	Al-Ittihad	2–1	Al-Okhdood	Jeddah
20:00	Felipe (yellow card) 28'; Al Mousa 45'; Kanté (yellow card) 60'; Haji 83'	Report	Collado 63'; Pedroza (yellow card) 70'	Stadium: Prince Abdullah Al Faisal Stadium; Attendance: 8,944; Referee: Yael Falcón Pérez (Argentina)

16 March 2024 24	Al-Fateh	2–4	Al-Ittihad	Al-Hasa
22:00	Al-Najdi 6'; Al-Shurafa 66'; Ali (yellow card) 90+10'	Report	Hamdallah 39' (pen.), 74'; Jota 45+4'; Al-Olayan (yellow card) 49' (yellow-red card) 77'; A. Al-Ghamdi 64'; Z. Hawsawi (yellow card) 90+9'	Stadium: Al-Fateh Club Stadium; Attendance: 6,558; Referee: Sergei Karasev (Russia)

29 March 2024 25	Al-Ittihad	3–1	Al-Fayha	Jeddah
22:00	Hamdallah 30'; A. Al-Ghamdi 45+2', (yellow card) 74'; Al-Sahafi 90+4'	Report	Sabiri 25' (pen.); Al-Khaibari (yellow card) 45+6'	Stadium: Prince Abdullah Al Faisal Stadium; Attendance: 9,312; Referee: Radu Petrescu (Romania)

1 April 2024 26	Al-Ahli	1–0	Al-Ittihad	Jeddah
22:00	Al-Asmari (yellow card) 6'; Al-Buraikan 34'; Majrashi (yellow card) 79'	Report	Al-Amri (yellow card) 79'; Al-Sqoor (yellow card) 90'	Stadium: King Abdullah Sports City; Attendance: 50,633; Referee: Rade Obrenović (Slovenia)

5 April 2024 27	Al-Ittihad	0–0	Al-Taawoun	Jeddah
22:00	Romarinho (yellow card) 80'	Report		Stadium: King Abdullah Sports City; Attendance: 9,648; Referee: César Soto Grado (Spain)

20 April 2024 28	Al-Hazem	2–3	Al-Ittihad	Buraidah
21:00	Ricardo (yellow card) 39'; Al-Thani 60'; Tozé 63'	Report	Al-Amri 21'; Al-Shamrani (yellow card) 34'; Ricardo 57' (o.g.); Dahmen 90+6' (o.g.); Hegazi (yellow card) 90+7'	Stadium: King Abdullah Sport City Stadium; Attendance: 1,158; Referee: Mohammed Al-Daqqash

26 April 2024 29	Al-Ittihad	1–3	Al-Shabab	Jeddah
21:00	Haji (yellow card) 18'; Hamdallah 58'	Report	Sharahili (yellow card) 41'; Diallo 48'; Kanabah (yellow card) 52'; Carlos 82'; Al-Qahtani (yellow card) 90+7'; Al-Juwayr 90+10'	Stadium: King Abdullah Sports City; Attendance: 18,323; Referee: César Ramos (Mexico)

3 May 2024 30	Abha	3–1	Al-Ittihad	Abha
21:00	Krychowiak 57' (pen.); Al-Ali 69'; Noguera 73'; Abdu (yellow card) 90+9'	Report	Jota 63'	Stadium: Prince Sultan bin Abdul Aziz Stadium; Attendance: 8,181; Referee: Ahmed Al-Rumaikhani

10 May 2024 31	Al-Ittihad	0–5	Al-Ettifaq	Jeddah
21:00		Report	Fofana 5'; Dembélé 31' (pen.); Toko Ekambi 35', 39', 55'; Abdulrahman (yellow card) 53'	Stadium: King Abdullah Sports City; Attendance: 13,214; Referee: Sultan Al-Harbi

16 May 2024 32	Al-Khaleej	1–1	Al-Ittihad	Dammam
21:00	Jung Woo-young (yellow card) 50'; Al Haydar (yellow card) 68'; Sherif 81'	Report	Al-Shanqeeti 45+3'; Romarinho (yellow card) 79'	Stadium: Prince Mohamed bin Fahd Stadium; Attendance: 8,457; Referee: Mohammed Al-Hoaish

23 May 2024 33	Al-Ittihad	4–1	Damac	Jeddah
21:00	Jota 39'; Haji 48'; Al Mousa (yellow card) 62'; Al-Shanqeeti (yellow card) 65'; Al-Sahafi 78'; Al-Nashri (yellow card) 85'; Al-Shamrani 87'	Report	Chafaï 90+3'	Stadium: Prince Abdullah Al Faisal Stadium; Attendance: 17,137; Referee: Shukri Al-Hanfoush

27 May 2024 34	Al-Nassr	4–2	Al-Ittihad	Riyadh
21:00	Mané (yellow card) 3'; Ronaldo 45+3', 69'; Ghareeb 79' (pen.); Al-Amri (yellow card) 90+5'; Al-Nemer 90+5'	Report	Al-Menhali (yellow card) 50', (red card) 66'; Al-Shamrani 88'; Fabinho 90+2'	Stadium: Al-Awwal Park; Attendance: 18,736; Referee: Majed Al-Shamrani

=== King Cup ===
All times are local, AST (UTC+3).

26 September 2023 Round of 32	Al-Kholood	1–1 (a.e.t.) (6–7 p)	Al-Ittihad	Ar Rass
21:00	Al-Dossari (yellow card) 33'; Vázquez 40'	Report	Dias 18' (o.g.); Al-Olayan (yellow card) 37'; Fabinho (yellow card) 72'; Felipe (yellow card) 92'	Stadium: Al-Hazem Club Stadium; Attendance: 1,263; Referee: Andrei Chivulete (Romania)
	Penalties
	Rezende (penalty scored); Taira (penalty scored); Vázquez (penalty scored); Al-Nakhli (penalty missed); Al-Suwailem (penalty scored); Al-Rashed (penalty scored); Al-Dossari (penalty missed); Dias (penalty missed); Al-Harbi (penalty scored); Al-Shahrani (penalty missed)		(penalty missed) Romarinho; (penalty scored) Fabinho; (penalty scored) Bamsaud; (penalty scored) Al-Amri; (penalty scored) Kanté; (penalty scored) Kadesh; (penalty missed) Camara; (penalty missed) Felipe; (penalty scored) Al-Shanqeeti; (penalty scored) Haji

31 October 2023 Round of 16	Al-Fayha	0–3	Al-Ittihad	Riyadh
17:45	Ryller (yellow card) 41'; Al-Baqawi (yellow card) 47'; Al-Rashidi (yellow card) 78'; Al-Shuwaish (yellow card) 87'	Report	Hamdallah 5', 87'; Kanté (yellow card) 81'; Benzema 90+4'	Stadium: King Fahd International Stadium; Attendance: 3,942; Referee: Tamás Bognár (Hungary)

4 February 2024 Quarter-finals	Al-Faisaly	0–4	Al-Ittihad	Riyadh
18:15	Cheikhi (yellow card) 21'; Al-Anzi (yellow card) 90'	Report	Hamdallah 45+4' (pen.); Kanté 54'; Hegazy 68', 80'	Stadium: Prince Faisal bin Fahd Stadium; Referee: Matthew Conger (New Zealand)

30 April 2024 Semi-finals	Al-Ittihad	1–2	Al-Hilal	Jeddah
21:00	Hegazi (yellow card) 30'; F. Al-Ghamdi (yellow card) 57'; Hamdallah 67'; Kadesh (yellow card) 90+5'	Report	Michael 25'; Milinković-Savić (red card) 42'; Mitrović (yellow card) 45+13'; Al-Bulaihi (yellow card) 50'; Abdulhamid 81'; Neves (yellow card) 90+3'	Stadium: King Abdullah Sports City; Attendance: 41,793; Referee: Benoît Bastien (France)

=== Champions League ===
==== Group stage ====
Pos	Team	Pld	W	D	L	GF	GA	GD	Pts	Qualification	ITH	SEP	QWJ	AGK
1	(Saudi Arabia) Al-Ittihad	6	5	0	1	11	4	+7	15	Advance to round of 16	—	2–1	1–0	3–0
2	(Iran) Sepahan	6	3	1	2	16	8	+8	10 (Note: Ranked on head-to-head points: Sepahan 4, Al-Quwa Al-Jawiya 1.)	Advance to round of 16	0–3 (Note: The match was abandoned after Al-Ittihad walked off in protest due to the presence of a sculpture of Qasem Soleimani on the pitch. The match was awarded a 3–0 win to Al-Ittihad, with Sepahan also being fined $200,000 and banned from hosting its next three Asian Champions League matches at home.)	—	1–0	9–0
3	(Iraq) Al-Quwa Al-Jawiya	6	3	1	2	9	7	+2	10		2–0	2–2	—	3–2
4	(Uzbekistan) AGMK	6	0	0	6	5	22	−17	0		1–2	1–3	1–2	—

Source: AFC
Rules for classification: Tiebreakers
Notes:

18 September 2023 1	Al-Ittihad (Saudi Arabia)	3–0	(Uzbekistan) AGMK	Jeddah, Saudi Arabia
19:00 UTC+3	Camara 11'; Romarinho 15', 42' (pen.); Al-Farhan (yellow card) 89'	Report	Kasymov (yellow card) 88'	Stadium: Prince Abdullah Al Faisal Stadium; Attendance: 13,897; Referee: Hiroyuki Kimura (Japan)

2 October 2023 2	Sepahan (Iran)	0–3 (awd.)	(Saudi Arabia) Al-Ittihad	Isfahan, Iran
19:30 UTC+3:30				Stadium: Naghsh-e Jahan Stadium
Note: The match was called off due to Al-Ittihad refusing to take the pitch over a bust of Qasem Soleimani. On 2 November 2023, AFC awarded a 3–0 win to Al-Ittihad.

23 October 2023 3	Al-Ittihad (Saudi Arabia)	1–0	(Iraq) Al-Quwa Al-Jawiya	Jeddah, Saudi Arabia
19:00 UTC+3	Felipe (yellow card) 76'; Hamdallah 90+4', (yellow card) 90+5'; Romarinho (yellow card) 90+9'	Report	Raed (yellow card) 90+3'	Stadium: King Abdullah Sports City; Attendance: 19,098; Referee: Mohammed Abdulla Hassan Mohamed (United Arab Emirates)

6 November 2023 4	Al-Quwa Al-Jawiya (Iraq)	2–0	(Saudi Arabia) Al-Ittihad	Erbil, Iraq
19:00 UTC+3	Jasim 44'; Abdul-Raheem 52'	Report	Al-Olayan (yellow card) 66'; Kanté (yellow card) 90+3'	Stadium: Franso Hariri Stadium; Attendance: 18,850; Referee: Ahmed Al-Kaf (Oman)

27 November 2023 5	AGMK (Uzbekistan)	1–2	(Saudi Arabia) Al-Ittihad	Olmaliq, Uzbekistan
21:00 UTC+5	Kasymov (yellow card) 45+3'; Boakye 78'	Report	Hamdallah 30', 34'	Stadium: OKMK Sport Majmuasi; Attendance: 10,171; Referee: Muhammad Taqi (Singapore)

4 December 2023 6	Al-Ittihad (Saudi Arabia)	2–1	(Iran) Sepahan	Mecca, Saudi Arabia
21:00 UTC+3	Al-Amri 14'; Felipe (yellow card) 19'; Hamdallah (yellow card) 45'; Al-Ghamdi (yellow card) 68'; Jota 69'; Z. Hawsawi (yellow card) 90+2'	Report	Dabo (yellow card) 45+4'; Rezaeian 48'; Asadi (yellow card) 68'; Niazmand (yellow card) 88'	Stadium: King Abdul Aziz Stadium; Attendance: 11,159; Referee: Ma Ning (China)

==== Knockout stage ====
===== Round of 16 =====
15 February 2024 First leg	Navbahor (Uzbekistan)	0–0	(Saudi Arabia) Al-Ittihad	Namangan, Uzbekistan
19:00 UTC+5	Hamrobekov (yellow card) 11'; Nikabadze (yellow card) 79'	Report	Al-Sqoor (yellow card) 53'	Stadium: Markaziy Stadium; Attendance: 26,200; Referee: Yusuke Araki (Japan)

22 February 2024 Second leg	Al-Ittihad (Saudi Arabia)	2–1 (2–1 agg.)	(Uzbekistan) Navbahor	Jeddah, Saudi Arabia
19:00 UTC+3	Hamdallah 45+6'; Tabatadze 87' (o.g.); Al-Amri (yellow card) 89'	Report	Benzema 25' (o.g.); Đokić (red card) 90+8'	Stadium: King Abdullah Sports City; Attendance: 34,832; Referee: Ko Hyung-jin (South Korea)

===== Quarter-finals =====
5 March 2024 First leg	Al-Hilal (Saudi Arabia)	2–0	(Saudi Arabia) Al-Ittihad	Riyadh, Saudi Arabia
21:00 UTC+3	Mitrović 40'; Al-Dawsari 42'; Milinković-Savić (yellow card) 79'; Koulibaly (yellow card) 81'	Report	Kanté (red card) 66'	Stadium: Kingdom Arena; Attendance: 18,387; Referee: Shaun Evans (Australia)

12 March 2024 Second leg	Al-Ittihad (Saudi Arabia)	0–2 (0–4 agg.)	(Saudi Arabia) Al-Hilal	Jeddah, Saudi Arabia
21:00 UTC+3	Felipe (yellow card) 10'; Al-Amri (yellow card) 24'; A. Al-Ghamdi (yellow card) 35'; Al-Farhan (yellow card) 55'; F. Al-Ghamdi (yellow card) 85'; Hamdallah (red card) 90+1'; Hegazi (yellow card) 90+1'	Report	Al-Faraj (yellow card) 37'; Al-Shahrani 61'; Milinković-Savić (yellow card) 68'; Al-Bulaihi (yellow card) 90+1'; Malcom 90+5'	Stadium: King Abdullah Sports City; Attendance: 42,375; Referee: Ma Ning (China)

=== Arab Club Champions Cup ===
==== Group stage ====
Pos	Team	Pld	W	D	L	GF	GA	GD	Pts	Qualification
1	(Saudi Arabia) Al-Ittihad Jeddah	3	3	0	0	5	2	+3	9	Advance to knockout stage
2	(Iraq) Al-Shorta	3	1	1	1	2	2	0	4	Advance to knockout stage
3	(Tunisia) Espérance de Tunis	3	0	2	1	1	2	−1	2	
4	(Tunisia) CS Sfaxien	3	0	1	2	0	2	−2	1	

Source: UAFA
Rules for classification: Group stage tiebreakers

27 July 2023 1	Espérance de Tunis (Tunisia)	1–2	(Saudi Arabia) Al-Ittihad	Taif, Saudi Arabia
22:00 UTC+3	Bouguerra 26'	Report	Hamdallah 35'; Benzema 55'	Stadium: King Fahd Stadium; Referee: Adel Al Naqbi (United Arab Emirates)

30 July 2023 2	Al-Ittihad (Saudi Arabia)	1–0	(Tunisia) Club Sfaxien	Taif, Saudi Arabia
22:00 UTC+3	Hamed (yellow card) 2'; Benzema 63'; Coronado (yellow card) 74'	Report	Conté (yellow card) 34' (yellow-red card) 84'; Ali (red card) 41'; Ghram (yellow card) 60'; Habbassi (yellow card) 64'; Hmidi (yellow card) 87'	Stadium: King Fahd Stadium; Referee: Lahlou Benbraham (Algeria)

2 August 2023 3	Al-Shorta (Iraq)	1–2	(Saudi Arabia) Al-Ittihad	Taif, Saudi Arabia
18:00 UTC+3	Moumouni (yellow card) 68', (goal) 80'; Yahya (yellow card) 87'	Report	Bamsaud 36'; Benzema 84' (pen.)	Stadium: King Fahd Stadium; Referee: Ammar Al-Jeneibi (United Arab Emirates)

==== Knockout phase ====
5 August 2023 Quarter-finals	Al-Ittihad (Saudi Arabia)	1–3	(Saudi Arabia) Al-Hilal	Taif, Saudi Arabia
21:00 UTC+3	Bamsaud (yellow card) 45+1'; Al-Amri (yellow card) 45+6'; Romarinho 56'; Al-Nashri (yellow card) 82'; Coronado (yellow card) 90'	Report	Milinković-Savić 14'; Michael (yellow card) 22'; S. Al-Dawsari 45+3' (pen.); Malcom 70'; Al-Bulaihi (yellow card) 78'	Stadium: King Fahd Stadium; Referee: Abdulrahman Al-Jassim (Qatar)

=== Super Cup ===
8 April 2024 Semi-finals	Al-Ittihad	2–1	Al-Wehda	Abu Dhabi, United Arab Emirates
21:00 UTC+4	Benzema 1'; Hamdallah 42'; Jota (yellow card) 50'	Report	Al-Ghamdi (yellow card) 66'; Al-Eisa 90+7'	Stadium: Al Nahyan Stadium; Attendance: 9,000; Referee: Faisal Al-Blwi

11 April 2024 Final	Al-Ittihad	1–4	Al-Hilal	Abu Dhabi, United Arab Emirates
21:30 UTC+4	Hamdallah 21'; Al-Amri (yellow card) 39'	Report	Malcom 5', 89', (yellow card) 90'; Lodi (yellow card) 20'; S. Al-Dawsari 44'; Koulibaly (yellow card) 53'; N. Al-Dawsari 90+6'	Stadium: Mohammed bin Zayed Stadium; Attendance: 27,250; Referee: Khaled Al-Teris

=== FIFA Club World Cup ===
12 December 2023 First round	Al-Ittihad (Saudi Arabia)	3–0	(New Zealand) Auckland City	Jeddah, Saudi Arabia
21:00 (AST)	Romarinho 29'; Kanté 34'; Benzema 40'	Report		Stadium: King Abdullah Sports City; Attendance: 50,248; Referee: Tori Penso (United States)

15 December 2023 Second round	Al Ahly (Egypt)	3–1	(Saudi Arabia) Al-Ittihad	Jeddah, Saudi Arabia
21:00 (AST)	Maâloul 21' (pen.); Ashour (yellow card) 36', (goal) 62'; El Shahat 59', (yellow card) 61'; Kahraba (yellow card) 69'; Modeste (red card) 90'	Report	Fabinho (yellow card) 67'; Benzema 90+2'	Stadium: King Abdullah Sports City; Attendance: 56,111; Referee: Jesús Valenzuela (Venezuela)

== Statistics ==
=== Appearances ===
Last updated on 27 May 2024.

No.	Pos	Nat	Player	Total		Pro League		King Cup		ACL		ACCC		Super Cup		FIFA CWC	
No.	Pos	Nat	Player	Apps	Goals	Apps	Goals	Apps	Goals	Apps	Goals	Apps	Goals	Apps	Goals	Apps	Goals
Goalkeepers
1	GK	(Saudi Arabia) KSA	Abdullah Al-Mayouf	27	0	12	0	3	0	9	0	0	0	2	0	1	0
21	GK	(Saudi Arabia) KSA	Abdullah Al-Jadaani	0	0	0	0	0	0	0	0	0	0	0	0	0	0
34	GK	(Brazil) BRA	Marcelo Grohe	23	0	17	0	1	0	0	0	4	0	0	0	1	0
35	GK	(Saudi Arabia) KSA	Mohammed Al-Mahasneh	5	0	5	0	0	0	0	0	0	0	0	0	0	0
51	GK	(Saudi Arabia) KSA	Faisal Al-Eisa	0	0	0	0	0	0	0	0	0	0	0	0	0	0
88	GK	(Saudi Arabia) KSA	Osama Al-Marmash	0	0	0	0	0	0	0	0	0	0	0	0	0	0
Defenders
4	DF	(Saudi Arabia) KSA	Omar Hawsawi	17	0	9+3	0	0	0	3+1	0	1	0	0	0	0	0
5	DF	(Italy) ITA	Luiz Felipe	27	0	17+1	0	2	0	4+1	0	0	0	2	0	0	0
12	DF	(Saudi Arabia) KSA	Zakaria Hawsawi	22	1	7+3	1	1+1	0	2+2	0	3+1	0	0	0	2	0
13	DF	(Saudi Arabia) KSA	Muhannad Al-Shanqeeti	31	1	14+7	1	0+1	0	3+1	0	3	0	0	0	2	0
15	DF	(Saudi Arabia) KSA	Hassan Kadesh	38	1	23+1	1	4	0	6	0	0	0	0+2	0	2	0
19	DF	(Saudi Arabia) KSA	Turki Al-Jaadi	9	0	2+4	0	1	0	0	0	0	0	0+2	0	0	0
20	DF	(Saudi Arabia) KSA	Ahmed Sharahili	12	0	7	0	0	0	1	0	4	0	0	0	0	0
25	DF	(Saudi Arabia) KSA	Suwailem Al-Menhali	10	0	2+7	0	0	0	0+1	0	0	0	0	0	0	0
26	DF	(Egypt) EGY	Ahmed Hegazi	21	2	10	0	2	2	5	0	0	0	2	0	2	0
28	DF	(Saudi Arabia) KSA	Ahmed Bamsaud	28	1	12+3	0	1+1	0	4+1	0	3+1	1	0	0	0+2	0
30	DF	(Saudi Arabia) KSA	Saad Al Mousa	13	1	9+1	1	1	0	2	0	0	0	0	0	0	0
33	DF	(Saudi Arabia) KSA	Madallah Al-Olayan	34	0	14+6	0	3	0	5	0	2+1	0	2	0	0+1	0
37	DF	(Saudi Arabia) KSA	Fawaz Al-Sqoor	21	0	12+1	0	1+1	0	4	0	0	0	2	0	0	0
Midfielders
6	MF	(Saudi Arabia) KSA	Sultan Al-Farhan	26	0	6+7	0	2+1	0	0+5	0	1+3	0	0	0	0+1	0
7	MF	(France) FRA	N'Golo Kanté	46	4	30	2	3+1	1	6	0	1+1	0	2	0	2	1
8	MF	(Brazil) BRA	Fabinho	30	1	17+2	1	2	0	7	0	0	0	0	0	2	0
14	MF	(Saudi Arabia) KSA	Awad Al-Nashri	12	0	4+3	0	1	0	1	0	1+2	0	0	0	0	0
16	MF	(Saudi Arabia) KSA	Faisal Al-Ghamdi	31	1	17+1	1	3	0	6+2	0	0	0	0	0	2	0
17	MF	(Saudi Arabia) KSA	Marwan Al-Sahafi	34	2	10+10	2	2+1	0	3+5	0	1+1	0	0	0	0+1	0
22	MF	(Saudi Arabia) KSA	Hammam Al-Hammami	4	0	0+3	0	0	0	0	0	0	0	0+1	0	0	0
27	MF	(Saudi Arabia) KSA	Ahmed Al-Ghamdi	15	2	6+4	2	1+1	0	2+1	0	0	0	0	0	0	0
29	MF	(Saudi Arabia) KSA	Farhah Al-Shamrani	22	2	5+10	2	0+2	0	0+3	0	0	0	2	0	0	0
77	MF	(Saudi Arabia) KSA	Saleh Al-Amri	46	4	9+20	3	2+1	0	3+4	1	3+1	0	1+1	0	0+1	0
80	MF	(Saudi Arabia) KSA	Hamed Al-Ghamdi	2	0	0	0	0	0	0	0	0	0	0+2	0	0	0
97	MF	(Saudi Arabia) KSA	Salem Ayyash	0	0	0	0	0	0	0	0	0	0	0	0	0	0
Forwards
9	FW	(France) FRA	Karim Benzema	33	16	21	9	1	1	3	0	3+1	3	2	1	2	2
11	FW	(Portugal) POR	Jota	29	5	9+7	4	0+1	0	4	1	3+1	0	1+1	0	0+2	0
52	FW	(Saudi Arabia) KSA	Talal Haji	11	2	3+6	2	0+1	0	0+1	0	0	0	0	0	0	0
90	FW	(Brazil) BRA	Romarinho	46	9	26+2	5	3+1	0	6	2	3+1	1	2	0	2	1
99	FW	(Morocco) MAR	Abderrazak Hamdallah	41	30	22+2	19	3	4	8	4	2+1	1	2	2	0+1	0
Players sent out on loan this season
24	MF	(Saudi Arabia) KSA	Abdulrahman Al-Aboud	5	0	0+3	0	0	0	0+2	0	0	0	0	0	0	0
70	FW	(Saudi Arabia) KSA	Haroune Camara	14	1	2+6	0	1	0	2+2	1	1	0	0	0	0	0
Player who made an appearance this season but have left the club
3	MF	(Egypt) EGY	Tarek Hamed	2	0	0	0	0	0	0	0	2	0	0	0	0	0
10	MF	(Brazil) BRA	Igor Coronado	21	5	15	5	0	0	0	0	3+1	0	0	0	2	0

=== Goalscorers ===
Rank	No.	Pos	Nat	Name	Pro League	King Cup	Champions League	Arab Club Champions Cup	Super Cup	Club World Cup	Total
1	99	FW	(Morocco)	Abderrazak Hamdallah	19	4	4	1	2	0	30
2	9	FW	(France)	Karim Benzema	9	1	0	3	1	2	16
3	90	FW	(Brazil)	Romarinho	5	0	2	1	0	1	9
4	10	MF	(Brazil)	Igor Coronado	5	0	0	0	0	0	5
4	11	FW	(Portugal)	Jota	4	0	1	0	0	0	5
6	7	MF	(France)	N'Golo Kanté	2	1	0	0	0	1	4
6	77	MF	(Saudi Arabia)	Saleh Al-Amri	3	0	1	0	0	0	4
8	17	MF	(Saudi Arabia)	Marwan Al-Sahafi	2	0	0	0	0	0	2
8	26	DF	(Egypt)	Ahmed Hegazi	0	2	0	0	0	0	2
8	27	MF	(Saudi Arabia)	Ahmed Al-Ghamdi	2	0	0	0	0	0	2
8	29	MF	(Saudi Arabia)	Farhah Al-Shamrani	2	0	0	0	0	0	2
8	52	FW	(Saudi Arabia)	Talal Haji	2	0	0	0	0	0	2
13	8	MF	(Brazil)	Fabinho	1	0	0	0	0	0	1
13	12	DF	(Saudi Arabia)	Zakaria Hawsawi	1	0	0	0	0	0	1
13	13	DF	(Saudi Arabia)	Muhannad Al-Shanqeeti	1	0	0	0	0	0	1
13	15	DF	(Saudi Arabia)	Hassan Kadesh	1	0	0	0	0	0	1
13	16	MF	(Saudi Arabia)	Faisal Al-Ghamdi	1	0	0	0	0	0	1
13	28	DF	(Saudi Arabia)	Ahmed Bamsaud	0	0	0	1	0	0	1
13	30	DF	(Saudi Arabia)	Saad Al Mousa	1	0	0	0	0	0	1
13	70	FW	(Saudi Arabia)	Haroune Camara	0	0	1	0	0	0	1
Own goal					2	1	1	0	0	0	4
Total					63	9	10	6	3	4	95

Last Updated: 27 May 2024

=== Assists ===
Rank	No.	Pos	Nat	Name	Pro League	King Cup	Champions League	Arab Club Champions Cup	Super Cup	Club World Cup	Total
1	9	FW	(France)	Karim Benzema	7	0	1	1	0	0	9
1	10	MF	(Brazil)	Igor Coronado	7	0	0	2	0	0	9
3	7	MF	(France)	N'Golo Kanté	5	0	1	0	0	0	6
3	99	FW	(Morocco)	Abderrazak Hamdallah	3	0	2	1	0	0	6
5	90	FW	(Brazil)	Romarinho	3	1	0	0	1	0	5
6	37	DF	(Saudi Arabia)	Fawaz Al-Sqoor	4	0	0	0	0	0	4
7	8	MF	(Brazil)	Fabinho	1	1	1	0	0	0	3
7	52	FW	(Saudi Arabia)	Talal Haji	3	0	0	0	0	0	3
9	12	DF	(Saudi Arabia)	Zakaria Hawsawi	1	0	0	0	0	1	2
9	13	DF	(Saudi Arabia)	Muhannad Al-Shanqeeti	0	0	1	0	0	1	2
9	27	MF	(Saudi Arabia)	Ahmed Al-Ghamdi	1	1	0	0	0	0	2
9	28	DF	(Saudi Arabia)	Ahmed Bamsaud	2	0	0	0	0	0	2
9	33	DF	(Saudi Arabia)	Madallah Al-Olayan	2	0	0	0	0	0	2
9	70	FW	(Saudi Arabia)	Haroune Camara	2	0	0	0	0	0	2
9	77	MF	(Saudi Arabia)	Saleh Al-Amri	2	0	0	0	0	0	2
16	6	MF	(Saudi Arabia)	Sultan Al-Farhan	0	1	0	0	0	0	1
16	15	DF	(Saudi Arabia)	Hassan Kadesh	0	1	0	0	0	0	1
16	16	MF	(Saudi Arabia)	Faisal Al-Ghamdi	0	1	0	0	0	0	1
16	17	MF	(Saudi Arabia)	Marwan Al-Sahafi	1	0	0	0	0	0	1
16	24	MF	(Saudi Arabia)	Abdulrahman Al-Aboud	1	0	0	0	0	0	1
Total					45	6	6	4	1	2	64

Last Updated: 27 May 2024

=== Clean sheets ===
Rank	No.	Pos	Nat	Name	Pro League	King Cup	Champions League	Arab Club Champions Cup	Super Cup	Club World Cup	Total
1	34	GK	(Brazil)	Marcelo Grohe	7	1	0	1	0	1	10
2	1	GK	(Saudi Arabia)	Abdullah Al-Mayouf	2	1	3	0	0	0	6
Total					9	2	3	1	0	1	16

Last Updated: 5 April 2024
