= 2024–25 Al-Kholood Club season =

Al-Kholood
2024–25 season
- President: Mohammed Al-Khalifah
- Manager: Paulo Duarte (until 13 October 2024); Noureddine Zekri (from 13 October 2024)
- Stadium: Al-Hazem Club Stadium
- Pro League: 9th
- King's Cup: Round of 32 (knocked out by Al-Shabab)
- Top goalscorer: League: Myziane Maolida (15 goals); All: Myziane Maolida (16 goals)
- Highest home attendance: 9,937 v Al-Hilal; 28 September 2024; Saudi Pro League
- Lowest home attendance: 687 v Al-Orobah; 15 September 2024; Saudi Pro League
- Average home league attendance: 2,746
- All statistics correct as of 26 May 2025.

The 2024–25 season was Al-Kholood's 55th year in existence and their first ever season in the Pro League following their promotion from the FDL in the previous season. The club participated in the Pro League and the King's Cup.

The season covers the period from 1 July 2024 to 30 June 2025.

== Players ==
=== Squad information ===
As of 1 February 2025

Note: Flags indicate national team as defined under FIFA eligibility rules; some limited exceptions apply. Players may hold more than one non-FIFA nationality.

No.	Pos.	Nation	Player
5	DF	NGA	William Troost-Ekong
6	MF	NGA	Ambrose Ochigbo (on loan from ES Zarzis)
7	DF	KSA	Sultan Al-Shehri
8	MF	KSA	Abdulrahman Al-Safri
9	FW	COM	Myziane Maolida
10	MF	ESP	Álex Collado (on loan from Real Betis)
11	MF	KSA	Mohammed Sawaan
12	DF	KSA	Hassan Al-Asmari
15	MF	MLI	Aliou Dieng (on loan from Al Ahly Cairo)
16	FW	KSA	Meshari Al-Oufi
18	FW	COD	Jackson Muleka (on loan from Beşiktaş)
20	FW	KSA	Bassem Al-Oraini (on loan from Al-Taawoun)
22	MF	KSA	Hammam Al-Hammami (on loan from Al-Ittihad)
23	DF	SVK	Norbert Gyömbér

No.	Pos.	Nation	Player
24	DF	KSA	Abdullah Hawsawi
27	DF	KSA	Hamdan Al-Shamrani (on loan from Al-Ettifaq)
29	MF	KSA	Farhah Al-Shamrani (on loan from Al-Ittihad)
30	GK	KSA	Mohammed Mazyad
33	GK	KSA	Jassem Al-Ashban
34	GK	BRA	Marcelo Grohe
45	MF	KSA	Abdulfattah Asiri
47	FW	KSA	Abdulmalik Al-Harbi
51	MF	KSA	Zaid Al-Enezi (on loan from Al-Ula)
70	DF	KSA	Mohammed Jahfali
80	FW	GAM	Kebba Sowe
90	MF	KSA	Anas Al-Otaibi
96	MF	FRA	Kévin N'Doram
99	FW	KSA	Majed Khalifah

=== Out on loan ===
Note: Flags indicate national team as defined under FIFA eligibility rules; some limited exceptions apply. Players may hold more than one non-FIFA nationality.

No. / Pos. / Nation / Player; 3 / DF / KSA / Abdullah Masoud (at Al-Houra until 30 June 2025)	No. / Pos. / Nation / Player; 4 / DF / KSA / Jamaan Al-Dossari (at Al-Faisaly until 30 June 2025)

== Transfers and loans ==
=== Transfers in ===
Entry date	Position	No.	Player	From club	Fee	Ref.
30 June 2024	DF	12	(Saudi Arabia) Badr Al-Jameel	(Saudi Arabia) Al-Shoulla	End of loan	
30 June 2024	MF	19	(Saudi Arabia) Nawaf Al-Shuwaier	(Saudi Arabia) Al-Diriyah	End of loan	
30 June 2024	FW	11	(Saudi Arabia) Fayez Al-Harthi	(Saudi Arabia) Al-Saqer	End of loan	
1 July 2024	GK	34	(Brazil) Marcelo Grohe	(Saudi Arabia) Al-Ittihad	Free	
5 July 2024	DF	19	(Saudi Arabia) Abdullah Al-Rashidi	(Saudi Arabia) Al-Adalah	Free	
12 July 2024	DF	70	(Saudi Arabia) Mohammed Jahfali	(Saudi Arabia) Al-Hilal	Free	
13 July 2024	DF	24	(Saudi Arabia) Abdullah Hawsawi	(Saudi Arabia) Damac	Free	
23 July 2024	GK	30	(Saudi Arabia) Mohammed Mazyad	(Saudi Arabia) Al-Arabi	Free	
23 July 2024	MF	8	(Saudi Arabia) Abdulrahman Al-Safri	(Saudi Arabia) Al-Fayha	Free	
22 August 2024	DF	23	(Slovakia) Norbert Gyömbér	(Italy) Salernitana	Free	
22 August 2024	FW	9	(Comoros) Myziane Maolida	(Germany) Hertha Berlin	Undisclosed	
23 August 2024	DF	5	(Nigeria) William Troost-Ekong	(Greece) PAOK	$1,345,000	
23 August 2024	MF	96	(France) Kévin N'Doram	(France) Metz	Free	
2 September 2024	DF	12	(Saudi Arabia) Hassan Al-Asmari	(Saudi Arabia) Al-Ittihad	Free	
2 September 2024	MF	45	(Saudi Arabia) Abdulfattah Asiri	(Saudi Arabia) Al-Tai	Free	
2 September 2024	FW	99	(Saudi Arabia) Majed Khalifah	(Saudi Arabia) Al-Ahli	Free	

=== Loans in ===
Start date	End date	Position	No.	Player	From club	Fee	Ref.
13 July 2024	End of season	DF	27	(Saudi Arabia) Hamdan Al-Shamrani	(Saudi Arabia) Al-Ettifaq	None	
22 August 2024	End of season	MF	10	(Spain) Álex Collado	(Spain) Real Betis	None	
23 August 2024	End of season	MF	15	(Mali) Aliou Dieng	(Egypt) Al Ahly Cairo	$560,000	
23 August 2024	End of season	MF	22	(Saudi Arabia) Hammam Al-Hammami	(Saudi Arabia) Al-Ittihad	None	
23 August 2024	End of season	FW	18	(Democratic Republic of the Congo) Jackson Muleka	(Turkey) Beşiktaş	$1,111,000	
31 August 2024	End of season	MF	29	(Saudi Arabia) Farhah Al-Shamrani	(Saudi Arabia) Al-Ittihad	None	
3 September 2024	End of season	FW	20	(Saudi Arabia) Bassem Al-Oraini	(Saudi Arabia) Al-Taawoun	None	
27 January 2025	End of season	MF	6	(Nigeria) Ambrose Ochigbo	(Tunisia) ES Zarzis	$100,000	
28 January 2025	End of season	MF	51	(Saudi Arabia) Zaid Al-Enezi	(Saudi Arabia) Al-Ula	None	

=== Transfers out ===
Exit date	Position	No.	Player	To club	Fee	Ref.
30 June 2024	GK	28	(Saudi Arabia) Raghdan Matri	(Saudi Arabia) Al-Ittihad	End of loan	
30 June 2024	DF	55	(Saudi Arabia) Ahmed Al-Nakhli	(Saudi Arabia) Al-Ahli	End of loan	
30 June 2024	MF	21	(Saudi Arabia) Hussain Al-Eisa	(Saudi Arabia) Al-Ittihad	End of loan	
30 June 2024	MF	77	(Saudi Arabia) Al Mutasim Seddiq	(Saudi Arabia) Al-Ittihad	End of loan	
1 July 2024	DF	12	(Saudi Arabia) Badr Al-Jameel	(Saudi Arabia) Al-Rayyan	Free	
15 July 2024	FW	99	(Iraq) Ahmed Yasin	(Sweden) Örebro	Free	
21 July 2024	MF	8	(Brazil) Arthur Rezende	(Saudi Arabia) Al-Diriyah	Free	
23 July 2024	MF	32	(Argentina) Mariano Vázquez	(Qatar) Muaither	Free	
26 July 2024	DF	40	(Saudi Arabia) Salah Al-Ben Ali	(Saudi Arabia) Jeddah	Free	
28 July 2024	MF	17	(Saudi Arabia) Mohammed Al-Shahrani	(Saudi Arabia) Al-Jandal	Free	
1 August 2024	GK	44	(Saudi Arabia) Ali Bouamer	(Saudi Arabia) Al-Jubail	Free	
1 August 2024	FW	15	(Saudi Arabia) Mazen Al-Suwailem	(Saudi Arabia) Al-Jubail	Free	
3 August 2024	GK	14	(Brazil) Rafael Martins	(Saudi Arabia) Al-Jubail	Free	
3 August 2024	DF	23	(Brazil) Roberto Dias	(Saudi Arabia) Al-Jubail	Free	
20 August 2024	DF	13	(Saudi Arabia) Saud Al-Rashed	(Saudi Arabia) Al-Hazem	Free	
20 August 2024	DF	4	(Saudi Arabia) Turki Al-Jalfan	(Saudi Arabia) Al-Zulfi	Free	
22 August 2024	DF	20	(Saudi Arabia) Abdullah Al-Harbi	(Saudi Arabia) Al-Jabalain	Free	
25 August 2024	MF	27	(Portugal) Afonso Taira	(Saudi Arabia) Al-Batin	Free	
5 September 2024	FW	11	(Saudi Arabia) Fayez Al-Harthi	(Saudi Arabia) Al-Taqadom	Free	
11 September 2024	MF	66	(Saudi Arabia) Riyadh Al-Ibrahim	(Saudi Arabia) Al-Najma	Free	
20 September 2024	MF	6	(Saudi Arabia) Tareq Al-Kaebi	(Saudi Arabia) Al-Washm	Free	
23 September 2024	DF	87	(Saudi Arabia) Azzam Al-Mazrou	(Saudi Arabia) Al-Saqer	Free	
31 January 2025	DF	19	(Saudi Arabia) Abdullah Al-Rashidi	(Saudi Arabia) Al-Zulfi	Free	

=== Loans out ===
Start date	End date	Position	No.	Player	To club	Fee	Ref.
18 September 2024	End of season	DF	3	(Saudi Arabia) Abdullah Masoud	(Saudi Arabia) Al-Houra	None	
28 January 2025	End of season	DF	4	(Saudi Arabia) Jamaan Al-Dossari	(Saudi Arabia) Al-Faisaly	None	

== Pre-season ==
24 July 2024 Friendly	Al-Kholood (Saudi Arabia)	1–0	(Saudi Arabia) Al-Bukiryah	Yalova, Turkey
18:00 TRT				Stadium: Yalova Atatürk Stadyumu

31 July 2024 Friendly	Al-Kholood (Saudi Arabia)	1–0	(Iran) Nassaji Mazandaran	Yalova, Turkey
18:00 TRT				Stadium: Yalova Atatürk Stadyumu

4 August 2024 Friendly	Al-Kholood (Saudi Arabia)	0–0	(Saudi Arabia) Al-Batin	Yalova, Turkey
18:30 TRT				Stadium: Yalova Atatürk Stadyumu

7 August 2024 Friendly	Al-Kholood (Saudi Arabia)	1–0	(Turkmenistan) Ahal	Gölcük, Turkey
17:00 TRT				Stadium: Gölcük Şehir Stadyumu

15 August 2024 Friendly	Al-Kholood (Saudi Arabia)	0–0	(Saudi Arabia) Al-Raed	Buraidah, Saudi Arabia
19:30 AST		Report		Stadium: Al-Raed Club Stadium

== Competitions ==
=== Overview ===
Competition	Record							
Competition	Pld	W	D	L	GF	GA	GD	Win %
Pro League	34	12	4	18	42	64	−22	35.29
King Cup	1	0	0	1	1	3	−2	0.00
Total	35	12	4	19	43	67	−24	34.29

Updated to match played 26 May 2025
Source: Competitions

=== Pro League ===
==== League table ====
Pos	Team	Pld	W	D	L	GF	GA	GD	Pts
7	Al-Ettifaq	34	14	8	12	44	45	−1	50
8	Al-Taawoun	34	12	9	13	40	39	+1	45
9	Al-Kholood	34	12	4	18	42	64	−22	40
10	Al-Fateh	34	11	6	17	47	61	−14	39
11	Al-Riyadh	34	10	8	16	37	52	−15	38

Source: SPL
Rules for classification: 1) Points; 2) Head-to-head points; 3) Head-to-head goal difference; 4) Total goal difference; 5) Total goals scored; 6) Fair-play points
(Note: Head-to-head record is used only after all the matches between the teams in question have been played).

==== Results summary ====
Overall								Home						Away					
Pld	W	D	L	GF	GA	GD	Pts	W	D	L	GF	GA	GD	W	D	L	GF	GA	GD
34	12	4	18	42	64	−22	40	8	2	7	23	27	−4	4	2	11	19	37	−18

Last updated: 26 May 2025.
Source: Saudi Pro League

==== Results by round ====
Round	1	2	3	4	5	6	7	8	9	10	11	12	13	14	15	16	17	18	19	20	21	22	23	24	25	26	27	28	29	30	31	32	33	34
Ground	H	A	H	A	H	A	A	H	A	H	A	A	H	A	H	A	H	A	H	A	H	A	H	H	A	H	A	H	H	A	H	A	H	A
Result	L	L	D	W	L	L	D	D	D	L	L	W	L	W	W	L	W	L	W	L	W	L	W	W	L	L	L	L	L	L	W	L	W	W
Position	13	15	16	12	12	16	15	14	15	15	16	14	15	13	12	12	11	12	12	12	11	11	11	10	10	11	11	12	12	14	12	13	11	9

Updated to match(es) played on 26 May 2025. Source: Saudi Pro League
A = Away; H = Home; W = Win; D = Draw; L = Loss

==== Matches ====
All times are local, AST (UTC+3).

Win Draw Loss Postponed

24 August 2024 1	Al-Kholood	0–1	Al-Ittihad	Buraidah
19:10	Dieng (yellow card) 73'	Report	Kadesh (yellow card) 60'; Aouar 90+4'	Stadium: King Abdullah Sports City; Attendance: 2,296; Referee: Faisal Al-Blwi

29 August 2024 2	Al-Riyadh	3–1	Al-Kholood	Riyadh
18:55	Jahfali 21' (o.g.); Al-Bakr (yellow card) 30'; Bayesh 75'; Al-Aqel 90+4'	Report	Hawsawi (yellow card) 28'; H. Al-Shamrani (yellow card) 45+12'; Collado 50'	Stadium: Prince Faisal bin Fahd Sports City; Attendance: 604; Referee: Sultan Al-Harbi

15 September 2024 3	Al-Kholood	3–3	Al-Orobah	Ar Rass
18:50	Dieng 10'; Collado 52'; Maolida 89' (pen.); Al-Dossari (yellow card) 90+1'	Report	Seri 27'; Guðmundsson (yellow card) 28', (goal) 46'; Al-Rashidi (yellow card) 48'; Boateng 77'; Al-Shuwaish (yellow card) 85'	Stadium: Al-Hazem Club Stadium; Attendance: 687; Referee: Raed Al Zahrani

19 September 2024 4	Al-Wehda	0–1	Al-Kholood	Mecca
21:00	Darwish (yellow card) 45' (yellow-red card) 57'; Al Makahasi (yellow card) 66'; Al-Shammari (yellow card) 90'; Al-Muwallad (yellow card) 90+3'	Report	Collado 60'; Muleka (yellow card) 81'; Al-Hammami (yellow card) 90+3'	Stadium: King Abdulaziz Sports City; Attendance: 897; Referee: Fareeh Al-Jaloud

28 September 2024 5	Al-Kholood	2–4	Al-Hilal	Buraidah
21:00	N'Doram (yellow card) 55'; Al-Safri (yellow card) 59'; Al-Hammami 71'; Troost-Ekong 87' (pen.)	Report	Koulibaly 38'; Malcom 43'; Al-Bulaihi 45+3'; Lodi 48'; N. Al-Dawsari (yellow card) 53'; Bounou (yellow card) 86'	Stadium: King Abdullah Sports City; Attendance: 9,937; Referee: Anastasios Sidiropoulos (Greece)

4 October 2024 6	Al-Khaleej	1–0	Al-Kholood	Dammam
18:00	Al-Fahad (yellow card) 40'; Al Salem 66'	Report	Dieng (yellow card) 10'; Al-Safri (yellow card) 13'	Stadium: Prince Mohamed bin Fahd Stadium; Attendance: 1,189; Referee: Sami Al-Jires

20 October 2024 7	Al-Fateh	1–1	Al-Kholood	Al-Hasa
17:45	Djaniny 54'	Report	Collado 9'; Al-Hammami (yellow card) 26'	Stadium: Al-Fateh Club Stadium; Attendance: 4,823; Referee: Khaled Al-Ahmari

25 October 2024 8	Al-Kholood	3–3	Al-Nassr	Buraidah
18:05	Maolida 12', 28'; Muleka (yellow card) 68', (goal) 71'; Al-Shehri (yellow card) 74'; Grohe (yellow card) 90+8'	Report	Laporte 16'; Talisca 24', 90+5' (pen.); Brozović (yellow card) 73'; Al-Khaibari (yellow card) 83'	Stadium: King Abdullah Sports City; Attendance: 3,856; Referee: Georgi Kabakov (Bulgaria)

2 November 2024 9	Al-Taawoun	1–1	Al-Kholood	Buraidah
17:55	Barrow 32'; Al-Saluli (yellow card) 90+4'	Report	Maolida 18'; F. Al-Shamrani (yellow card) 55'; Al-Safri (yellow card) 60'; Al-Hammami (yellow card) 80'	Stadium: Al-Taawoun Club Stadium; Attendance: 2,661; Referee: Khalid Al-Teris

7 November 2024 10	Al-Kholood	0–2	Al-Shabab	Buraidah
18:00		Report	Hamdallah 58' (pen.), 75'; Harboush (yellow card) 66'	Stadium: King Abdullah Sports City; Attendance: 1,110; Referee: Abdullah Al-Kharboush

24 November 2024 11	Damac	2–1	Al-Kholood	Abha
16:40	Nkoudou 24'; Solan (yellow card) 54' (yellow-red card) 71'; Chafaï 67'; Al-Anazi (yellow card) 74'; Fallatah (yellow card) 90+4'	Report	Muleka (yellow card) 7', (goal) 45+4'; Collado (yellow card) 21'; Al-Safri (yellow card) 51'	Stadium: Prince Sultan bin Abdulaziz Sports City; Attendance: 632; Referee: Mohammed Al-Ismail

28 November 2024 12	Al-Okhdood	1–2	Al-Kholood	Najran
18:05	Al-Qaydhi (yellow card) 27'; Godwin 62'; Petros (yellow card) 89'	Report	Maolida 25' (pen.); F. Al-Shamrani (yellow card) 30'; Al-Hammami (yellow card) 45+2'; Gyömbér (yellow card) 55'; Al-Oraini 90+5'	Stadium: Prince Hathloul bin Abdulaziz Sports City; Attendance: 627; Referee: Faisal Al-Blwi

6 December 2024 13	Al-Kholood	0–3	Al-Qadsiah	Buraidah
17:50	Al-Shehri (red card) 44'	Report	Quiñones 10', 71', (yellow card) 34'; Aubameyang 49'; Al-Ammar (yellow card) 74'	Stadium: King Abdullah Sports City; Attendance: 1,134; Referee: Christian Dingert (Germany)

10 January 2025 14	Al-Ettifaq	2–3	Al-Kholood	Dammam
17:40	Wijnaldum 30'; Al-Olayan (yellow card) 44'; Gray (yellow card) 66'; Dembélé 90+6' (pen.)	Report	Muleka 26' (pen.); Hawsawi (yellow card) 32'; Maolida 54', 90+10'; Gyömbér (yellow card) 90+4'	Stadium: EGO Stadium; Attendance: 2,678; Referee: Abdullah Al-Shehri

15 January 2025 15	Al-Kholood	1–0	Al-Ahli	Buraidah
20:00	H. Al-Shamrani (yellow card) 79'; Collado 90+2', (yellow card) 90+3'	Report	Demiral (red card) 54'; Al-Johani (yellow card) 71'	Stadium: King Abdullah Sports City; Attendance: 1,193; Referee: Mohammed Al-Hakim (Sweden)

20 January 2025 16	Al-Fayha	1–0	Al-Kholood	Al Majma'ah
18:10	Smalling (yellow card) 48'; Pozuelo 53'; Al-Beshe (yellow card) 60'; Shukurov (yellow card) 76'	Report		Stadium: Al Majma'ah Sports City; Attendance: 1,026; Referee: Faisal Al-Blwi

25 January 2025 17	Al-Kholood	2–1	Al-Raed	Ar Rass
16:50	Dieng (yellow card) 16', (goal) 87'; Sawaan 61'; Al-Hammami (yellow card) 88'; F. Al-Shamrani (yellow card) 90+8'	Report	Sayoud 25'; Abeid (yellow card) 33'; Hawsawi (yellow card) 45+7'; Al-Subaie (yellow card) 90+6'	Stadium: Al-Hazem Club Stadium; Attendance: 1,092; Referee: Abdullah Al-Shehri

1 February 2025 18	Al-Ittihad	4–3	Al-Kholood	Jeddah
20:00	Al-Aboud 35', (yellow card) 76'; Bergwijn 45+9' (pen.), 63', (yellow card) 67'; Kadesh 47'; Kanté (yellow card) 81'	Report	Troost-Ekong 15'; Maolida 23', 90+2'; H. Al-Shamrani (yellow card) 37'	Stadium: Prince Abdullah Al-Faisal Sports City; Attendance: 13,847; Referee: Majed Al-Shamrani

8 February 2025 19	Al-Kholood	3–2	Al-Riyadh	Ar Rass
16:55	Maolida 55'; Al-Hammami 57', 77'; N'Doram (yellow card) 65'	Report	Bayesh 1'; Tambakti (yellow card) 19'; Al-Aqel (yellow card) 80'; Konaté 88'; Hawsawi (yellow card) 90+1'	Stadium: Al-Hazem Club Stadium; Attendance: 1,358; Referee: Sultan Al-Harbi

14 February 2025 20	Al-Orobah	2–0	Al-Kholood	Sakakah
16:00	Al-Maqati (yellow card) 32'; Guðmundsson (yellow card) 41'; Al Somah 63'; Muhar (yellow card) 71'; Abu Taha 87'	Report	Al-Safri (yellow card) 9'; Maolida (yellow card) 28'; Sawaan (yellow card) 40'; Hawsawi (yellow card) 79'; Jahfali (yellow card) 84'	Stadium: Al Jouf University Stadium; Attendance: 1,526; Referee: Abdullah Al-Owaidan

22 February 2025 21	Al-Kholood	1–0	Al-Wehda	Ar Rass
16:00	Al-Safri (yellow card) 6'; Maolida 20'	Report	Al-Eisa (yellow card) 45+5'	Stadium: Al-Hazem Club Stadium; Attendance: 2,468; Referee: Khalid Al-Turais

25 February 2025 22	Al-Hilal	5–1	Al-Kholood	Riyadh
18:30	Malcom 3', 20'; S. Al-Dawsari 4', 55'; Leonardo 28'	Report	Al-Safri 65'	Stadium: Kingdom Arena; Attendance: 17,781; Referee: Tamás Bognár (Hungary)

1 March 2025 23	Al-Kholood	2–1	Al-Khaleej	Ar Rass
22:00	Muleka 16' (pen.); Maolida 42' (pen.); Al-Safri (yellow card) 67'; N'Doram (yellow card) 85'	Report	Sherif 8'; Tisserand (yellow card) 14'; Murg (yellow card) 41'; Al-Samiri (yellow card) 90'; Aboulshamat (yellow card) 90+2'	Stadium: Al-Hazem Club Stadium; Attendance: 2,806; Referee: Khaled Al-Ahmari

6 March 2025 24	Al-Kholood	2–1	Al-Fateh	Ar Rass
22:00	Fernandes 31' (o.g.); Troost-Ekong (yellow card) 45+10'; Muleka 70'; H. Al-Shamrani (yellow card) 72'	Report	Machado (yellow card) 13' (yellow-red card) 82'; Sbaï 76'; Fernandes (yellow card) 78'	Stadium: Al-Hazem Club Stadium; Attendance: 2,280; Referee: Sultan Al-Harbi

14 March 2025 25	Al-Nassr	3–1	Al-Kholood	Riyadh
22:00	Ronaldo 4'; Mané 26'; Durán 41'; Lajami (yellow card) 46'; Boushal (yellow card) 47' (yellow-red card) 56'	Report	Lajami 72' (o.g.); F. Al-Shamrani (yellow card) 79'	Stadium: Al-Awwal Park; Attendance: 12,492; Referee: Faisal Al-Blwi

4 April 2025 26	Al-Kholood	0–2	Al-Taawoun	Ar Rass
17:30		Report	Martínez 70', (yellow card) 73'; Sabiri 80'; El Mahdioui (yellow card) 88'	Stadium: Al-Hazem Club Stadium; Attendance: 2,685; Referee: Shukri Al-Hanfoush

10 April 2025 27	Al-Shabab	2–0	Al-Kholood	Riyadh
18:50	Guanca 12'; Hamdallah 45+4' (pen.); Renan (yellow card) 87'	Report	F. Al-Shamrani (yellow card) 58'	Stadium: Al-Shabab Club Stadium; Attendance: 2,880; Referee: Abdullah Al-Owaidan

18 April 2025 28	Al-Kholood	1–3	Damac	Ar Rass
19:05	H. Al-Shamrani (yellow card) 28'; Maolida 51'; Hawsawi (yellow card) 54'	Report	Nkoudou 18' (pen.), 45' (pen.); Al-Anazi (yellow card) 33'; Stanciu 73'	Stadium: Al-Hazem Club Stadium; Attendance: 3,576; Referee: Mohammed Al-Hoaish

23 April 2025 29	Al-Kholood	0–1	Al-Okhdood	Ar Rass
19:10	Dieng (yellow card) 6'	Report	Godwin 67', (yellow card) 68'; Musona (yellow card) 89'; Hawsawi (yellow card) 90+6'	Stadium: Al-Hazem Club Stadium; Attendance: 3,260; Referee: Nikola Dabanović (Montenegro)

2 May 2025 30	Al-Qadsiah	4–1	Al-Kholood	Dammam
21:00	Aubameyang 13', 56'; Quiñones 27', 34'; Puertas (yellow card) 90+3'	Report	Hawsawi (yellow card) 38'; Collado (yellow card) 41'; H. Al-Shamrani (yellow card) 45+4'; Muleka 51' (pen.); F. Al-Shamrani (yellow card) 83'; Ambrose (yellow card) 90'	Stadium: Prince Mohamed bin Fahd Stadium; Attendance: 10,781; Referee: Andris Treimanis (Latvia)

10 May 2025 31	Al-Kholood	1–0	Al-Ettifaq	Ar Rass
19:20	Maolida 68'; H. Al-Shamrani (yellow card) 90+7'	Report	Al-Olayan (yellow card) 17'; Al-Khateeb (yellow card) 42'; Ali (yellow card) 90+2'; Hendry (red card) 90+6'; Abdulrahman (yellow card) 90+9'	Stadium: Al-Hazem Club Stadium; Attendance: 3,303; Referee: Faisal Al-Blwi

17 May 2025 32	Al-Ahli	4–1	Al-Kholood	Jeddah
21:00	Majrashi (yellow card) 29'; Ibañez (yellow card) 45+1'; Al-Buraikan 47'; Mahrez 66'; Al-Nabit 77'; Toney 86' (pen.)	Report	Sawaan (yellow card) 44'; H. Al-Shamrani (yellow card) 45+1'; Dams 60' (o.g.); Dieng (yellow card) 65'; Troost-Ekong (yellow card) 84'	Stadium: Prince Abdullah Al-Faisal Sports City; Attendance: 5,193; Referee: Leandro Rey Hilfer (Argentina)

21 May 2025 33	Al-Kholood	2–0	Al-Fayha	Ar Rass
19:25	Al-Hammami 45+1'; Dieng 82'	Report	Vareta (yellow card) 45+4'; Al-Rashidi (yellow card) 61'; Shukurov (yellow card) 84'	Stadium: Al-Hazem Club Stadium; Attendance: 3,636; Referee: Mohammed Al-Hoaish

26 May 2025 34	Al-Raed	1–2	Al-Kholood	Buraidah
21:00	Al-Yousef (yellow card) 33'; Al-Amri (yellow card) 35', (goal) 73'; Gonzalez (red card) 39'; Hawsawi (yellow card) 82'	Report	Al-Hammami (yellow card) 19'; Muleka 45+4'; N'Doram (yellow card) 51'; Maolida 70'; Sawaan (yellow card) 90+6'	Stadium: Al-Raed Club Stadium; Attendance: 471; Referee: Ali Al-Qahtani

=== King's Cup ===
All times are local, AST (UTC+3).

24 September 2024 Round of 32	Al-Kholood	1–3	Al-Shabab	Ar Rass
21:00	Troost-Ekong (yellow card) 25'; Maolida 29'; Gyömbér (yellow card) 45+3'	Report	Bonaventura 36'; Hamdallah 65', 80'; Guanca (yellow card) 70'	Stadium: Al-Hazem Club Stadium; Attendance: 1,299; Referee: Mohammed Abu Shaqarah

== Statistics ==
=== Appearances ===
Last updated on 26 May 2025.

No.	Pos	Nat	Player	Total		Pro League		King's Cup	
No.	Pos	Nat	Player	Apps	Goals	Apps	Goals	Apps	Goals
Goalkeepers
30	GK	(Saudi Arabia) KSA	Mohammed Mazyad	2	0	2	0	0	0
33	GK	(Saudi Arabia) KSA	Jassem Al-Ashban	0	0	0	0	0	0
34	GK	(Brazil) BRA	Marcelo Grohe	33	0	32	0	1	0
Defenders
5	DF	(Nigeria) NGA	William Troost-Ekong	33	2	32	2	1	0
7	DF	(Saudi Arabia) KSA	Sultan Al-Shehri	18	0	5+12	0	1	0
12	DF	(Saudi Arabia) KSA	Hassan Al-Asmari	12	0	3+8	0	0+1	0
19	DF	(Saudi Arabia) KSA	Abdullah Al-Rashidi	1	0	0+1	0	0	0
23	DF	(Slovakia) SVK	Norbert Gyömbér	34	0	33	0	1	0
24	DF	(Saudi Arabia) KSA	Abdullah Hawsawi	33	0	28+4	0	1	0
27	DF	(Saudi Arabia) KSA	Hamdan Al-Shamrani	28	0	25+2	0	0+1	0
70	DF	(Saudi Arabia) KSA	Mohammed Jahfali	14	0	6+8	0	0	0
Midfielders
6	MF	(Nigeria) NGA	Ambrose Ochigbo	6	0	0+6	0	0	0
8	MF	(Saudi Arabia) KSA	Abdulrahman Al-Safri	29	1	17+11	1	1	0
10	MF	(Spain) ESP	Álex Collado	30	5	29	5	1	0
11	MF	(Saudi Arabia) KSA	Mohammed Sawaan	31	1	17+13	1	0+1	0
15	MF	(Mali) MLI	Aliou Dieng	31	3	30	3	1	0
22	MF	(Saudi Arabia) KSA	Hammam Al-Hammami	32	4	17+15	4	0	0
29	MF	(Saudi Arabia) KSA	Farhah Al-Shamrani	11	0	4+7	0	0	0
45	MF	(Saudi Arabia) KSA	Abdulfattah Asiri	13	0	3+9	0	0+1	0
51	MF	(Saudi Arabia) KSA	Zaid Al-Enezi	7	0	0+7	0	0	0
96	MF	(France) FRA	Kévin N'Doram	30	0	29+1	0	0	0
Forwards
9	FW	(Comoros) COM	Myziane Maolida	35	16	33+1	15	1	1
16	FW	(Saudi Arabia) KSA	Meshari Al-Oufi	2	0	0+2	0	0	0
18	FW	(Democratic Republic of the Congo) COD	Jackson Muleka	30	7	27+2	7	1	0
20	FW	(Saudi Arabia) KSA	Bassem Al-Oraini	10	1	0+10	1	0	0
47	FW	(Saudi Arabia) KSA	Abdulmalik Al-Harbi	0	0	0	0	0	0
80	FW	(The Gambia) GAM	Kebba Sowe	1	0	0+1	0	0	0
99	FW	(Saudi Arabia) KSA	Majed Khalifah	4	0	1+3	0	0	0
Players sent out on loan this season
4	DF	(Saudi Arabia) KSA	Jamaan Al-Dossari	6	0	1+4	0	1	0
Player who made an appearance this season but have left the club
17	MF	(Saudi Arabia) KSA	Riyadh Al-Ibrahim	1	0	0+1	0	0	0

=== Goalscorers ===
Rank	No.	Pos	Nat	Name	Pro League	King Cup	Total
1	9	FW	(Comoros)	Myziane Maolida	15	1	16
2	18	FW	(Democratic Republic of the Congo)	Jackson Muleka	7	0	7
3	10	MF	(Spain)	Álex Collado	5	0	5
4	22	MF	(Saudi Arabia)	Hammam Al-Hammami	4	0	4
5	15	MF	(Mali)	Aliou Dieng	3	0	3
6	5	DF	(Nigeria)	William Troost-Ekong	2	0	2
7	8	MF	(Saudi Arabia)	Abdulrahman Al-Safri	1	0	1
7	11	MF	(Saudi Arabia)	Mohammed Sawaan	1	0	1
7	20	FW	(Saudi Arabia)	Bassem Al-Oraini	1	0	1
Own goal					3	0	3
Total					42	1	43

Last Updated: 26 May 2025

=== Assists ===
Rank	No.	Pos	Nat	Name	Pro League	King Cup	Total
1	18	FW	(Democratic Republic of the Congo)	Jackson Muleka	5	0	5
2	11	MF	(Saudi Arabia)	Mohammed Sawaan	4	0	4
2	24	DF	(Saudi Arabia)	Abdullah Hawsawi	4	0	4
4	10	MF	(Spain)	Álex Collado	2	1	3
4	22	MF	(Saudi Arabia)	Hammam Al-Hammami	3	0	3
6	5	DF	(Nigeria)	William Troost-Ekong	1	0	1
6	8	MF	(Saudi Arabia)	Abdulrahman Al-Safri	1	0	1
6	23	DF	(Slovakia)	Norbert Gyömbér	1	0	1
6	45	MF	(Saudi Arabia)	Abdulfattah Asiri	1	0	1
Total					22	1	23

Last Updated: 26 May 2025

=== Clean sheets ===
Rank	No.	Pos	Nat	Name	Pro League	King Cup	Total
1	34	GK	(Brazil)	Marcelo Grohe	5	0	5
Total					5	0	5

Last Updated: 21 May 2025
