= Mariano Vázquez =

Mariano Vázquez may refer to:

- Mariano R. Vázquez (1909–1939), Catalan politician during the Spanish Civil War
- Mariano Vázquez (footballer) (born 1992), Argentine professional footballer
