= Marcelo Grohe =

Brazilian footballer (born 1987)

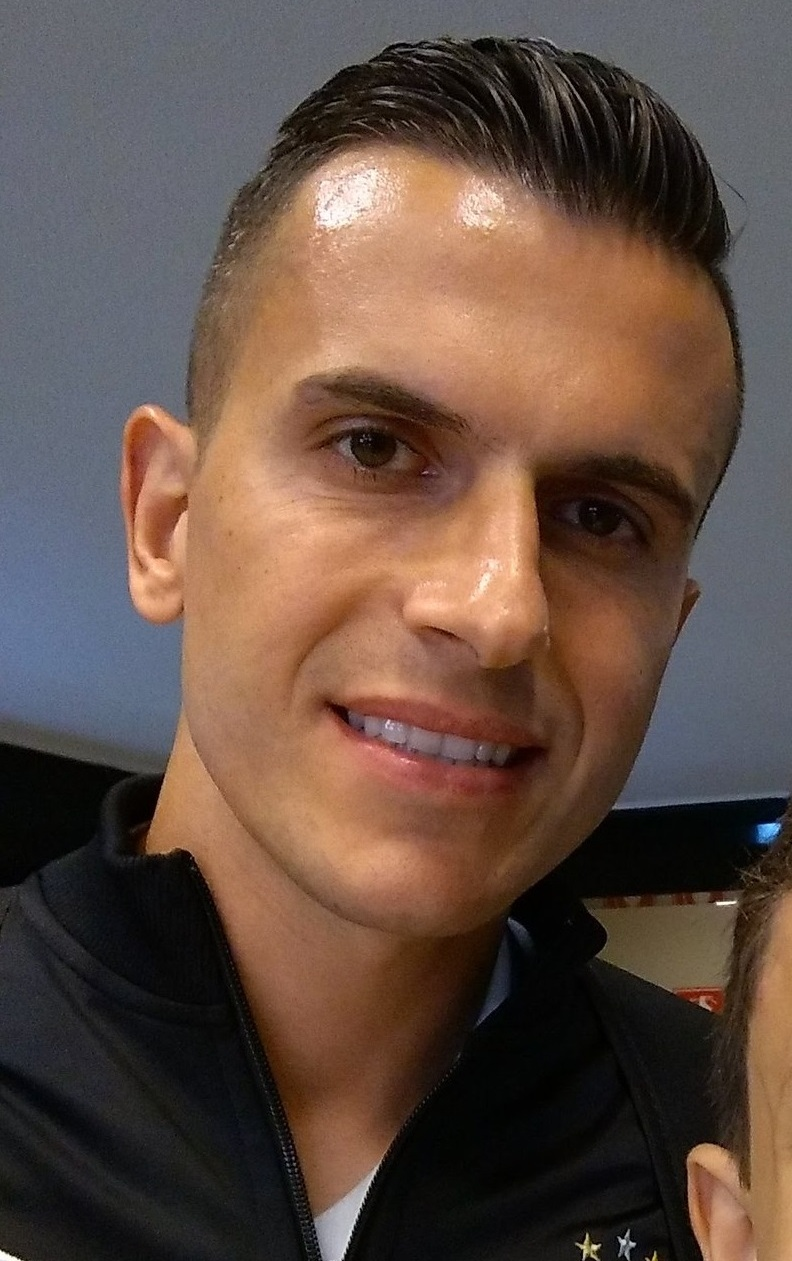
- Grohe in 2018

Personal information
- Full name: Marcelo Grohe
- Date of birth: 13 January 1987 (age 39)
- Place of birth: Campo Bom, Brazil
- Height: 1.88 m (6 ft 2 in)
- Position: Goalkeeper

Youth career
- 2000–2005: Grêmio

Senior career*
Years	Team	Apps	(Gls)
2005–2019	Grêmio	304	(0)
2019–2024	Al-Ittihad	121	(0)
2024–2025	Al-Kholood	32	(0)
2025–2026	Al-Shabab	33	(0)

International career^{‡}
2005	Brazil U18	2	(0)
2014–2016	Brazil	2	(0)
- * Club domestic league appearances and goals as of 22:21, 20 May 2026 (UTC) ‡ National team caps and goals as of 9 September 2015

Marcelo Grohe (born 13 January 1987) is a Brazilian professional footballer who plays as a goalkeeper.

== Club career ==
=== Grêmio ===
Born in Campo Bom, Rio Grande do Sul, Grohe began his career at Grêmio, where he arrived in 2000 to serve on the under-13 team. Within five years, was he was promoted to the first team squad at 18, to be the third goalkeeper in the Campeonato Brasileiro Série B, however he did not play that season.

On 18 January 2006, Grohe made his professional debut, playing 90 minutes in a 2–1 away win against São Luiz for the Campeonato Gaúcho. A backup to Rodrigo Galatto during the year, he became a starter during the year's Gauchão as Galatto was injured, but was again a backup after Galatto returned, and later was demoted to third-choice after the arrival of Sebastián Saja.

Grohe started the 2008 campaign as a starter ahead of new signing of Victor, after both Galatto and Saja left, but later became a backup of the former. In June 2012, he finally became a first-choice, after Victor left to Atlético Mineiro.

Grohe was again a backup option in 2013, after the arrival of veteran Dida. He regained his starting spot in the following year after Dida left, and remained an undisputed starter afterwards.

On 25 October 2017, during a match against Barcelona SC, Grohe made a save that is considered by some "the greatest save of all-time", even compared to Gordon Banks' save of the century at the 1970 World Cup; Banks himself praised the save.

=== Al-Ittihad ===
At the end of 2018, Grohe was sold for US$3 million to Al-Ittihad of Saudi Arabia. He signed a 3 1/2-year contract, but was initially sidelined by a wrist injury that required surgery.

On 8 November 2019, he made his season debut, in a 4–0 home win against Al-Riyadh in the King Cup.

On 2 December 2020, Grohe saved an Éver Banega penalty to help send Al-Ittihad to the Arab Club Champions Cup final. Grohe played 31 games in the 2020–21 season, finishing with eight clean sheets, winning the goalkeeper of the month award three times.

In 2024 he ended his stint with the club after five seasons, 141 matches and two titles: the 2022–23 Saudi Pro League and the 2022 Saudi Super Cup.

=== Al-Kholood ===
On 30 June 2024, Grohe joined newly promoted Saudi Pro League side Al-Kholood.

=== Al-Shabab ===
On 9 September 2025, Grohe joined Al-Shabab.

== International career ==
Grohe was a non-playing member of the Brazilian squad at the 2015 Copa América in Chile and at the 2014 Superclásico de las Américas in China. He made his debut on 5 September 2015 in a 1–0 friendly win over Costa Rica at the Red Bull Arena in New Jersey.

== Career statistics ==
As of match played 16 January 2025

Appearances and goals by club, season and competition
Club	Season	League			State league (Note: Includes Campeonato Gaúcho)		National cup (Note: Includes Copa do Brasil, King's Cup)		Continental		Other		Total	
Club	Season	Division	Apps	Goals	Apps	Goals	Apps	Goals	Apps	Goals	Apps	Goals	Apps	Goals
Grêmio	2005	Série B	0	0	0	0	0	0	—		—		0	0
Grêmio	2006	Série A	20	0	9	0	0	0	—		—		29	0
Grêmio	2007	Série A	6	0	1	0	0	0	0	0	—		7	0
Grêmio	2008	Série A	0	0	9	0	3	0	2 (Note: Appearances in Copa Sudamericana)	0	—		14	0
Grêmio	2009	Série A	10	0	4	0	0	0	2 (Note: Appearances in Copa Libertadores)	0	—		16	0
Grêmio	2010	Série A	3	0	0	0	1	0	0	0	—		4	0
Grêmio	2011	Série A	6	0	9	0	0	0	2	0	—		17	0
Grêmio	2012	Série A	32	0	0	0	0	0	6	0	—		38	0
Grêmio	2013	Série A	1	0	5	0	0	0	3	0	—		9	0
Grêmio	2014	Série A	35	0	12	0	1	0	8	0	—		56	0
Grêmio	2015	Série A	23	0	16	0	9	0	0	0	—		48	0
Grêmio	2016	Série A	28	0	12	0	7	0	8	0	3 (Note: Appearances in Primeira Liga)	0	58	0
Grêmio	2017	Série A	23	0	12	0	6	0	14	0	2 (Note: Appearances in FIFA Club World Cup)	0	57	0
Grêmio	2018	Série A	18	0	10	0	3	0	12	0	2 (Note: Appearances in Recopa Sudamericana)	0	45	0
Grêmio	Total		205	0	99	0	30	0	57	0	7	0	398	0
Al-Ittihad	2019–20	Saudi Pro League	17	0	—		3	0	0	0	3 (Note: Appearances in Arab Club Champions Cup)	0	23	0
Al-Ittihad	2020–21	Saudi Pro League	29	0	—		2	0	—		2	0	33	0
Al-Ittihad	2021–22	Saudi Pro League	28	0	—		3	0	—		1	0	32	0
Al-Ittihad	2022–23	Saudi Pro League	30	0	—		3	0	—		2 (Note: Appearances in Saudi Super Cup)	0	35	0
Al-Ittihad	2023–24	Saudi Pro League	17	0	—		1	0	0	0	5 (Note: Four appearances in Arab Club Champions Cup, one appearance in FIFA Club World Cup)	0	23	0
Al-Ittihad	Total		121	0	—		12	0	0	0	13	0	146	0
Al-Kholood	2024–25	Saudi Pro League	32	0	—		1	0	—		—		33	0
Al-Shabab	2025–26	Saudi Pro League	0	0	—		0	0	—		0	0	0	0
Career total			358	0	99	0	43	0	57	0	20	0	577	0

== Honours ==
Grêmio

- Copa do Brasil: 2016
- Copa Libertadores: 2017
- Recopa Sudamericana: 2018
- Campeonato Brasileiro Série B: 2005
- Campeonato Gaúcho: 2006, 2007, 2010, 2018

Al-Ittihad

- Saudi Pro League: 2022–23
- Saudi Super Cup: 2022

Brazil

- Superclásico de las Américas: 2014
