= Myziane Maolida =

Footballer (born 1999)

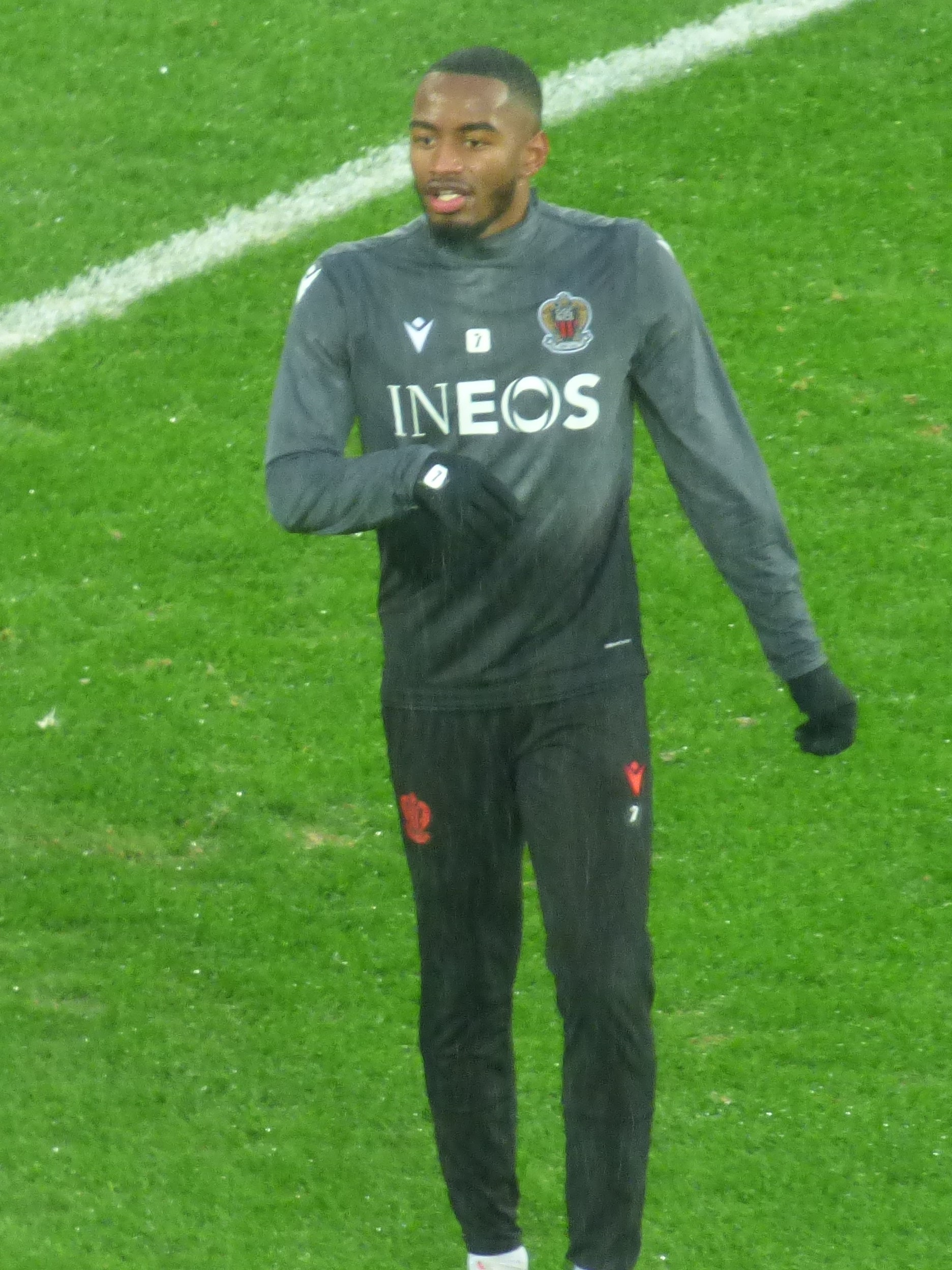
- Maolida with Nice in 2021

Personal information
- Date of birth: 14 February 1999 (age 27)
- Place of birth: Paris, France
- Height: 1.81 m (5 ft 11 in)
- Positions: Winger; forward

Youth career
- 1999–2008: Antony Sports
- 2007–2014: Boulogne-Billancourt
- 2014–2017: Lyon

Senior career*
| Years | Team | Apps | (Gls) |
| 2016–2018 | Lyon B | 25 | (13) |
| 2017–2018 | Lyon | 13 | (1) |
| 2018–2021 | Nice | 52 | (4) |
| 2021–2024 | Hertha BSC | 17 | (1) |
| 2023 | → Reims (loan) | 9 | (1) |
| 2023–2024 | Hertha BSC II | 9 | (3) |
| 2024 | → Hibernian (loan) | 18 | (10) |
| 2024–2026 | Al-Kholood | 42 | (18) |

International career^{‡}
| 2015 | France U16 | 7 | (4) |
| 2015–2016 | France U17 | 7 | (2) |
| 2016–2017 | France U18 | 8 | (1) |
| 2017–2018 | France U19 | 19 | (9) |
| 2018 | France U20 | 2 | (1) |
| 2018 | France U21 | 1 | (1) |
| 2023– | Comoros | 20 | (5) |
- * Club domestic league appearances and goals as of 3 January 2026 ‡ National team caps and goals as of 29 December 2025

Myziane Maolida (born 14 February 1999) is a professional footballer who plays as a winger or forward. Born in France, he plays for the Comoros national team.

== Club career ==
=== Lyon ===
Maolida developed through the Lyon academy. He made his Ligue 1 debut on 5 August 2017 in a 4–0 home win against Strasbourg, entering the field after 76 minutes for Mariano. He scored his first goal on 23 November 2017 in a 4–0 victory over Apollon Limassol in the UEFA Europa League. Three days later, he scored his first goal in Ligue 1 in a 5–0 away win against Nice.

=== Nice ===
In August 2018, Maolida signed with Ligue 1 side Nice agreeing a five-year contract with a reported release clause of about €100 million. Lyon received a transfer fee of €10 million plus 30% from future transfer profits. He debuted for Nice on 18 August 2018 in 1–1 draw against SM Caen.

=== Hertha BSC ===
==== 2021–22 ====
On 31 August 2021, Maolida signed a four-year contract with Bundesliga club Hertha BSC for a transfer fee of €4 million. He immediately scored in his league debut on 12 September in a 3–1 away victory over VfL Bochum. In the 2021–22 season, Maolida made 14 league appearances, scoring the one goal, as he was mainly a substitute. Finishing 16th in the league table, Hertha BSC retained their Bundesliga status after beating out Hamburger SV in playoffs for promotion and relegation. Maolida appeared in both games as a late substitute.

==== 2022–23: Loan to Reims ====
On 31 January 2023, after only three league appearances for Hertha in the first half of the 2022–23 Bundesliga season, Maolida joined Stade de Reims back in France on a loan deal until the end of the season. He made nine appearances in the second half of the 2022–23 Ligue 1 season, scoring one goal. After the loan expired, he rejoined Hertha, which were since relegated from the Bundesliga after finishing the season in last place.

==== 2023–24: Loan to Hibernian ====
Hertha BSC were looking to sell Maolida in the summer transfer window prior to the 2023–24 season, but contract negotiations between Maolida and Turkish side Ankaragücü failed. In August 2023, Hertha coach Pál Dárdai demoted Maolida to the second team Hertha BSC II, playing in the Regionalliga Nordost. He was loaned to Scottish Premiership club Hibernian in January 2024.

=== Al-Kholood ===
On 23 August 2024, Hertha sold Maolida to Saudi Arabian club Al-Kholood for an unknown transfer fee.

== International career ==
Born in France to Comorian and Malagasy parents, Maolida was a youth international for France.

He debuted with the Comoros national team in a 4–2 2026 FIFA World Cup qualification win over Central African Republic on 17 November 2023, scoring his side's fourth goal in his debut. In his second game for the national team, he scored the winner in a 1–0 victory over Ghana.

On 11 December 2025, Maolida was called up to the Comoros squad for the 2025 Africa Cup of Nations.

== Career statistics ==
As of match played on 16 January 2025

| Club | Season | League | | | National cup (Note: Includes Coupe de France, DFB-Pokal, Scottish Cup, King's Cup) | | League cup (Note: Includes Coupe de la Ligue) | | Continental | | Other | | Total | |
| Club | Season | Division | Apps | Goals | Apps | Goals | Apps | Goals | Apps | Goals | Apps | Goals | Apps | Goals |
|---|---|---|---|---|---|---|---|---|---|---|---|---|---|---|
| Lyon | 2017–18 | Ligue 1 | 13 | 1 | 2 | 0 | 1 | 1 | 6 (Note: Appearances in UEFA Europa League) | 1 | — | | 22 | 3 |
| Nice | 2018–19 | Ligue 1 | 14 | 0 | 0 | 0 | 1 | 1 | — | | — | | 15 | 1 |
| Nice | 2019–20 | Ligue 1 | 18 | 1 | 3 | 0 | 1 | 0 | — | | — | | 22 | 1 |
| Nice | 2020–21 | Ligue 1 | 19 | 3 | 2 | 0 | — | | 4 | 0 | — | | 25 | 3 |
| Nice | 2021–22 | Ligue 1 | 1 | 0 | 0 | 0 | — | | — | | — | | 1 | 0 |
| Nice | Total | | 65 | 5 | 7 | 0 | 3 | 2 | 10 | 1 | — | | 85 | 8 |
| Hertha BSC | 2021–22 | Bundesliga | 14 | 1 | 2 | 0 | — | | — | | 2 (Note: Appearances in Bundesliga relegation play-offs) | 0 | 18 | 1 |
| Hertha BSC | 2022–23 | Bundesliga | 3 | 0 | 0 | 0 | — | | — | | — | | 3 | 0 |
| Hertha BSC | Total | | 17 | 1 | 2 | 0 | — | | — | | 2 | 0 | 21 | 1 |
| Reims (loan) | 2022–23 | Ligue 1 | 9 | 1 | 1 | 0 | — | | — | | — | | 10 | 1 |
| Hertha BSC II | 2023–24 | Regionalliga Nordost | 9 | 3 | — | | — | | — | | — | | 9 | 3 |
| Hibernian (loan) | 2023–24 | Scottish Premiership | 18 | 10 | 2 | 1 | — | | — | | — | | 20 | 11 |
| Al-Kholood | 2024–25 | Saudi Pro League | 15 | 7 | 1 | 1 | — | | — | | — | | 16 | 8 |
| Career total | | | 133 | 27 | 13 | 2 | 3 | 2 | 10 | 1 | 2 | 0 | 161 | 32 |

=== International ===
Scores and results list Comoros's goal tally first.

| No. | Date | Venue | Opponent | Score | Result | Competition |
|---|---|---|---|---|---|---|
| 1. | 17 November 2023 | Stade de Moroni, Moroni, Comoros | Central African Republic | 4–1 | 4–2 | 2026 FIFA World Cup qualification |
| 2. | 21 November 2023 | Stade de Moroni, Moroni, Comoros | Ghana | 1–0 | 1–0 | 2026 FIFA World Cup qualification |
| 3. | 11 June 2024 | Stade Municipal d'Oujda, Oujda, Morocco | Chad | 1–0 | 2–0 | 2026 FIFA World Cup qualification |
| 4. | 15 November 2024 | Berkane Municipal Stadium, Berkane, Morocco | Gambia | 2–1 | 2–1 | 2025 Africa Cup of Nations qualification |
| 5. | 7 September 2025 | Meknes Honor Stadium, Meknes, Morocco | Central African Republic | 2–0 | 2–0 | 2026 FIFA World Cup qualification |

== Honors ==
Individual

- Scottish Premiership Player of the Month: March 2024
