= Marwan Al-Sahafi =

Saudi Arabian footballer

Personal information
- Full name: Marwan bin Saeed bin Masoud Al Sahafi
- Date of birth: 17 February 2004 (age 22)
- Place of birth: Jeddah, Saudi Arabia
- Height: 1.75 m (5 ft 9 in)
- Position: Winger

Team information
- Current team: Al-Ittihad
- Number: 22

Youth career
- Al-Ittihad

Senior career*
Years	Team	Apps	(Gls)
2022–	Al-Ittihad	38	(2)
2024–2025	→ Beerschot (loan)	25	(6)
2025–2026	→ Antwerp (loan)	24	(1)

International career^{‡}
2022–2023	Saudi Arabia U20	5	(2)
2023–	Saudi Arabia U23	6	(1)
2024–	Saudi Arabia	18	(1)
Medal record
Representing Saudi Arabia
Men's Football
Gulf Cup
Bronze medal – third place	2024-25 Kuwait
- * Club domestic league appearances and goals as of 30 October 2026 ‡ National team caps and goals as of 17 November 2026

Marwan Al-Sahafi (Arabic: مروان الصحفي; born 17 February 2004) is a Saudi Arabian professional footballer who plays as a winger for Saudi Pro League club Al-Ittihad and the Saudi Arabia national team.

== Club career ==
Al-Sahafi began his career at the youth team of Al-Ittihad. On 12 June 2022, Al-Sahafi signed his first professional contract with the club. He made his debut on 7 October 2022 in the 3–1 win against Al-Fateh by coming off the bench. On 11 October 2022, Al-Sahafi made his first start for the club in the 1–1 draw against Damac. On 1 September 2024, Al-Sahafi joined Belgian club Beerschot on a one-year loan. A month later, on 18 October, he scored his first goals by netting a brace in a 2–1 victory over Anderlecht. On 21 August 2025, Al-Sahafi joined Antwerp on a one-year loan.

== International career ==
On 27 February 2023, Al-Sahafi was called up to the Saudi Arabia under-20 national team to participate in the 2023 AFC U-20 Asian Cup.

Al-Sahafi made his debut for the Saudi Arabia national team on 6 June 2024 in a World Cup qualifier against Pakistan at the Jinnah Sports Stadium. He substituted Sultan Al-Ghannam in the 77th minute as Saudi Arabia won 3–0.

== Career statistics ==
=== Club ===
As of 31 May 2025

Club	Season	League		National cup (Note: Includes King Cup and Belgian Cup.)		Continental		Other		Total	
Club	Season	Apps	Goals	Apps	Goals	Apps	Goals	Apps	Goals	Apps	Goals
Al-Ittihad	2022–23	7	0	0	0	—		—		7	0
Al-Ittihad	2023–24	20	2	3	0	8 (Note: Appearances in AFC Champions League.)	0	3 (Note: Two appearances in Arab Club Champions Cup, and one appearance in FIFA Club World Cup)	0	34	2
Al-Ittihad	Total	27	2	3	0	8	0	3	0	41	2
Beerschot (loan)	2024–25	25	6	3	0	—		—		28	6
Career totals		52	8	6	0	8	0	3	0	69	8

=== International ===
As of match played 17 November 2026

Appearances and goals by national team and year
National team	Year	Apps	Goals
Saudi Arabia	2024	5	0
Saudi Arabia	2025	9	0
Saudi Arabia	2026	4	1
Total		18	1

Scores and results list Saudi Arabia's goal tally first.

List of international goals scored by Marwan Al-Sahafi
No.	Date	Venue	Opponent	Score	Result	Competition
1.	13 November 2026	Jassim bin Hamad Stadium, Al Rayyan, Qatar	South Korea	1–0	3–2	Friendly

== Honours ==
Al-Ittihad

- Saudi Pro League: 2022–23
- Saudi Super Cup: 2022

Saudi Arabia

- Arab Games gold medal: 2023
