= Hamdan Al-Shamrani =

Saudi Arabian association football player

Hamdan Al-Shamrani حمدان الشمراني
Personal information
- Full name: Hamdan Al-Shamrani
- Date of birth: 14 February 1996 (age 30)
- Place of birth: Jeddah, Saudi Arabia
- Height: 1.80 m (5 ft 11 in)
- Positions: Left back; left winger

Team information
- Current team: Al-Ula
- Number: 27

Youth career
- 2009–2017: Al-Ahli

Senior career*
Years	Team	Apps	(Gls)
2017–2018	Al-Ahli	4	(0)
2018–2019	Al-Faisaly	26	(3)
2019–2023	Al-Ittihad	82	(7)
2023	→ Al-Ettifaq (loan)	4	(1)
2023–2025	Al-Ettifaq	21	(0)
2024–2025	→ Al-Kholood (loan)	27	(0)
2025–	Al-Ula	0	(0)

International career^{‡}
2015–2016	Saudi Arabia U-20		
2016–2018	Saudi Arabia U-23		
2018–	Saudi Arabia	6	(0)
- * Club domestic league appearances and goals as of 22:04, 22 September 2023 (UTC) ‡ National team caps and goals as of 20:15, 10 September 2019 (UTC)

Hamdan Al-Shamrani (Arabic: حمدان الشمراني; born 14 February 1996) is a Saudi Arabian professional footballer who plays as a left back for Al-Ula and the Saudi Arabia national team.

== Career ==
He started his youth career with Al-Ahli in 2009 at the age of 12 and made his debut in the 2017 AFC Champions League. After 2 seasons with the first team, he joined fellow Pro League club Al-Faisaly on a three-year contract. On 12 May 2019, Al-Shamrani joined Al-Ittihad. On 9 August 2023, Al-Shamrani joined Al-Ettifaq on a one-year loan. On 8 September 2023, Al-Shamrani joined Al-Ettifaq permanently in a deal which saw Faisal Al-Ghamdi join Al-Ittihad. Al-Shamrani signed a four-year deal with Al-Ettifaq. On 13 July 2024, Al-Shamrani joined newly promoted side Al-Kholood on a one-year loan. On 8 August 2025, Al-Shamrani joined Al-Ula on a free transfer following his release from Al-Ettifaq.

Al-Shamrani received his first call-up for the Saudi Arabia national team for the 2019 AFC Asian Cup.

== Career statistics ==
=== Club ===
As of match played 27 May 2025

Club	Season	League		King Cup		Asia		Other		Total	
Club	Season	Apps	Goals	Apps	Goals	Apps	Goals	Apps	Goals	Apps	Goals
Al-Ahli	2016–17	0	0	0	0	3	0	0	0	3	0
Al-Ahli	2017–18	4	0	2	0	3	0	—		9	0
Al-Ahli	Total	4	0	2	0	6	0	0	0	12	0
Al-Faisaly	2018–19	26	3	0	0	—		—		26	3
Al-Ittihad	2019–20	25	4	3	0	4	0	6 (Note: Appearances in Arab Club Champions Cup)	0	38	4
Al-Ittihad	2020–21	17	0	0	0	—		1	0	18	0
Al-Ittihad	2021–22	28	2	2	0	—		1	0	31	2
Al-Ittihad	2022–23	12	1	0	0	—		2 (Note: Appearances in Saudi Super Cup)	0	14	1
Al-Ittihad	Total	82	7	5	0	4	0	9	0	103	7
Al-Ettifaq	2023–24	25	1	1	0	—		—		26	1
Al-Kholood (loan)	2024–25	27	0	1	0	—		—		28	0
Al-Ula	2025–26	0	0	—		—		—		0	0
Career totals		164	11	9	0	10	0	9	0	192	11

=== International ===
Statistics accurate as of match played 10 September 2019.

Saudi Arabia
Year	Apps	Goals
2018	1	0
2019	5	0
Total	6	0

== Honours ==
Al-Ittihad

- Saudi Professional League: 2022–23
- Saudi Super Cup: 2022
