= Álex Collado =

Spanish footballer (born 1999)

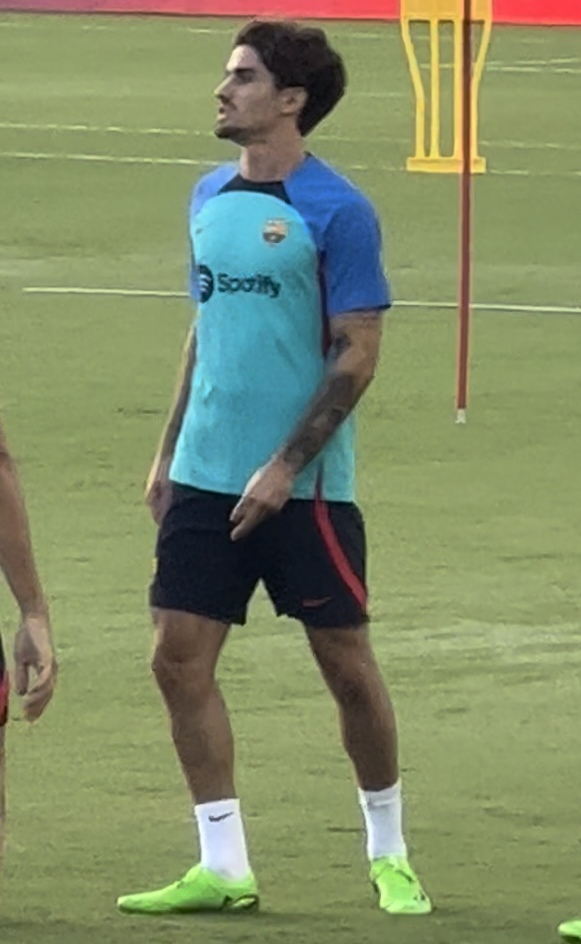
- Collado training with Barcelona in 2022

Personal information
- Full name: Álex Collado Gutiérrez
- Date of birth: 22 April 1999 (age 27)
- Place of birth: Sabadell, Spain
- Height: 1.77 m (5 ft 10 in)
- Positions: Attacking midfielder; winger

Team information
- Current team: Al-Shamal
- Number: 10

Youth career
- 2004–2006: Mercantil
- 2006–2010: Espanyol
- 2010–2018: Barcelona

Senior career*
Years	Team	Apps	(Gls)
2018–2021	Barcelona B	82	(18)
2019–2023	Barcelona	2	(0)
2022	→ Granada (loan)	17	(2)
2022–2023	→ Elche (loan)	15	(1)
2023–2025	Betis	0	(0)
2023–2024	→ Al-Okhdood (loan)	33	(4)
2024–2025	→ Al-Kholood (loan)	29	(5)
2025–	Al-Shamal	24	(6)

International career^{‡}
2017	Spain U19	1	(0)
2022–	Catalonia	1	(0)
- * Club domestic league appearances and goals as of 06 September 2026 ‡ National team caps and goals as of 26 May 2022

Álex Collado Gutiérrez (born 22 April 1999) is a Spanish professional footballer who plays for Qatar Stars League club Al-Shamal SC. Mainly an attacking midfielder, he can also play as a winger.

== Club career ==
=== Barcelona ===
Born in Sabadell, Barcelona, Catalonia, Collado joined FC Barcelona's youth setup in 2009, after stints at RCD Espanyol and CE Mercantil. He was a member of the Barcelona youth team that won the 2017–18 UEFA Youth League, defeating Chelsea 3–0 in the final.

After progressing through the youth setup, Collado made his debut for Barcelona B in the Segunda División on 17 March 2018, starting in a 1–1 away draw against Lorca FC. He scored his first goal for Barça B on 15 December 2018, the last-minute winner in a 2–1 home win against Lleida Esportiu.

Collado made his first team debut for Barcelona, as a starter, on 4 May 2019 in a 2–0 away loss to Celta Vigo in La Liga. Ahead of the 2020–21 season, Collado was named the new captain of Barça B following the long term injury of former captain Ferrán Sarsanedas.

On 31 March 2021, Collado renewed his contract with Barça for two further years, until 2023. However in August 2021 during Barcelona's pre-season, Collado left Barça's training camp in Stuttgart to resolve his future. After failed loan moves to Club Brugge and Sheffield United, Collado was left unregistered and wasn't included in either the senior squad or Barça B, which meant that he couldn't play until January 2022. It was then decided by the club that he would have to leave on loan in January due to La Liga regulations not allowing his registration for the rest of the season.

==== Loan to Granada ====
On 9 December 2021, Barça had announced that an agreement in principle was reached with Granada CF for the loan of Collado until the end of the season. The following 7 January, Granada officially announced the signing of Collado after bureaucratic issues were settled. He made his debut the next day in a 1–1 draw in the league against his parent club Barcelona.

==== Loan to Elche ====
On 15 August 2022, Collado agreed to a one-year loan deal with Elche CF also in the top tier.

=== Betis ===
On 27 July 2023, Collado signed a six-year contract with Real Betis in the top tier.

==== Loan to Al-Okhdood ====
On 31 July 2023, Real Betis announced the loan of Collado to Saudi Pro League side Al-Okhdood for the following season.

==== Loan to Al-Kholood ====
In August 2024, Collado returned to the Saudi Pro League, joining Al-Kholood on a season-long loan deal.

=== Al-Shamal ===
On 17 June 2025, Collado joined Qatar Stars League club Al-Shamal, signing a three-year contract.

== Career statistics ==
As of 27 February 2026

Club	League	Season	League		National Cup (Note: Includes Copa del Rey, King's Cup and Amir of Qatar Cup)		Continental		Other		Total	
Club	League	Season	Apps	Goals	Apps	Goals	Apps	Goals	Apps	Goals	Apps	Goals
Barcelona B	Segunda División	2017–18	1	0	—		—		—		1	0
Barcelona B	Segunda División B	2018–19	36	5	—		—		—		36	5
Barcelona B	Segunda División B	2019–20	24	5	—		—		—		24	5
Barcelona B	Segunda División B	2020–21	21 (Note: Includes five appearances in the second phase)	8	—		—		1 (Note: One appearance in Segunda División B play-offs)	0	22	8
Barcelona B	Total		82	18	0	0	0	0	1	0	83	18
Barcelona	La Liga	2018–19	1	0	0	0	0	0	0	0	1	0
Barcelona	La Liga	2019–20	1	0	0	0	0	0	0	0	1	0
Barcelona	Total		2	0	0	0	0	0	0	0	2	0
Granada (loan)	La Liga	2021–22	17	2	—		—		—		17	2
Elche (loan)	La Liga	2022–23	15	1	2	0	—		—		17	1
Al-Okhdood (loan)	Saudi Pro League	2023–24	33	4	1	0	—		—		34	4
Al-Kholood (loan)	Saudi Pro League	2024–25	29	5	1	0	—		—		30	5
Al-Shamal	Qatar Stars League	2025–26	16	5	1	0	—		2 (Note: Appearances in QSL Cup)	2	19	7
Career total			204	35	5	0	0	0	3	2	212	37

== Honours ==
Barcelona

- La Liga: 2018–19
- UEFA Youth League: 2017–18
