= Farhah Al-Shamrani =

Saudi Arabian footballer

Personal information
- Full name: Farhah Ali Saeed Al-Shamrani
- Date of birth: 27 February 2006 (age 20)
- Place of birth: Jeddah, Saudi Arabia
- Height: 1.66 m (5 ft 5 in)
- Position: Midfielder

Team information
- Current team: Al-Ittihad
- Number: 29

Youth career
- Al-Ittihad

Senior career*
Years	Team	Apps	(Gls)
2023–	Al-Ittihad	17	(2)
2024–2025	→ Al-Kholood (loan)	11	(0)
2025–2026	→ Al-Riyadh (loan)	0	(0)

International career
2021–2023	Saudi Arabia U17		
2023–	Saudi Arabia U20		
Medal record
Men's football
Representing Saudi Arabia
WAFF U-18 Championship
Winner	2024 Saudi Arabia
AFC U-20 Asian Cup
Runner-up	2025 China
- * Club domestic league appearances and goals as of 29 August 2025

Farhah Ali Saeed Al-Shamrani (Arabic: فرحة الشمراني; born 27 February 2006) is a Saudi Arabian professional footballer who plays as a midfielder for Pro League side Al-Ittihad.

== Club career ==
Al-Shamrani began his career at the youth team of Al-Ittihad. On 16 June 2022, Al-Shamrani signed his first professional contract with the club. He was called up to the first-team in July 2023 as part of the pre-season training camp.

On 18 September 2023, Al-Shamrani made his first-team debut for Al-Ittihad as a substitute in the 3–0 win against Uzbekistani side AGMK in the AFC Champions League. On 10 November 2023, Al-Shamrani made his Pro League debut for Al-Ittihad in a 4–2 win against Abha as a substitute replacing N'Golo Kanté in the 73rd minute.

On 8 March 2024, Al-Shamrani made his first start for the club in a 2–1 win against Al-Okhdood. On 23 May 2024, Al-Shamrani scored his first goal for the club in a 4–1 win against Damac. On 27 May 2024, Al-Shamrani scored once again in the final game of the season, a 4–2 defeat to Al-Nassr. On 31 August 2024, Al-Shamrani joined newly promoted side Al-Kholood on a one-year loan. On 10 September 2025, Al-Shamrani joined Al-Riyadh on loan.

== International career ==
As part of the Saudi Arabia U15 and Saudi Arabia U17 national teams, Al-Shamrani was called up to the 2021 WAFF U-15 Championship, the 2022 Arab Cup U-17, and the 2023 AFC U-17 Asian Cup.

== Career statistics ==
=== Club ===
As of 30 May 2024

Club	Season	League		King Cup		Asia		Other		Total	
Club	Season	Apps	Goals	Apps	Goals	Apps	Goals	Apps	Goals	Apps	Goals
Al-Ittihad	2023–24	15	2	2	0	3	0	2 (Note: Appearance(s) in Saudi Super Cup)	0	22	2
Al-Ittihad	Total	15	2	2	0	3	0	2	0	22	2
Career totals		15	2	2	0	3	0	2	0	22	2
