= Hassan Al-Asmari =

Saudi Arabian footballer

Hassan Al-Asmari حسن الأسمري
Personal information
- Full name: Hassan Ali Abdo Al-Asmari
- Date of birth: 6 October 2002 (age 24)
- Place of birth: Saudi Arabia
- Position: Right back

Youth career
- Al-Ittihad

Senior career*
Years	Team	Apps	(Gls)
2020–2024	Al-Ittihad	0	(0)
2022–2023	→ Najran (loan)	13	(2)
2023–2024	→ Al-Batin (loan)	13	(0)
2024–2026	Al-Kholood	21	(0)
- * Club domestic league appearances and goals

Hassan Al-Asmari (Arabic: حسن الأسمري; born 6 October 2002) is a Saudi Arabian professional footballer who plays as a right back.

== Career ==
Al-Asmari started his career at the youth team of Al-Ittihad and represented the club at every level. On 19 July 2022, Al-Asmari joined First Division side Najran. On 11 September 2023, Al-Asmari joined Al-Batin on loan. On 2 September 2024, Al-Asmari joined Al-Kholood.
