= Mazen Al-Suwailem =

Saudi Arabian footballer

Mazen Al-Suwailem مازن السويلم
Personal information
- Full name: Mazen Hussain Al-Suwailem
- Date of birth: 7 April 1996 (age 30)
- Place of birth: Saudi Arabia
- Position: Winger

Team information
- Current team: Al-Washm
- Number: 15

Youth career
- 2013–2016: Al-Hilal
- 2016–2017: Al-Fateh

Senior career*
Years	Team	Apps	(Gls)
2017–2018	Al-Fateh	2	(0)
2018–2019	Najran	5	(0)
2019–2021	Al-Washm	44	(10)
2021–2023	Al-Sahel	25	(3)
2023–2024	Al-Kholood	26	(2)
2024–2025	Al-Jubail	10	(0)
2025–	Al-Washm		
- * Club domestic league appearances and goals

Mazen Al-Suwailem (Arabic: مازن السويلم, born 7 April 1996) is a Saudi Arabian professional footballer who plays as a winger for Al-Washm.

== Career ==
Al-Suwailem started his career at Al-Hilal and is a product of the Al-Hilal's youth system. On Season 2016-2017 left Al-Hilal and signed with Al-Fateh. On 10 October 2017, Al-Suwailem made his professional debut for Al-Fateh against Al-Taawoun in the Pro League, replacing Ali Al-Zaqaan. On 8 September 2018, Al-Suwaliem left Al-Fateh and joined Najran. On 6 August 2019, he left Najran and joined Al-Washm. On 3 August 2021, Al-Suwailem joined Al-Sahel. On 10 August 2023, Al-Suwailem joined Al-Kholood. On 23 September 2025, Al-Suwailem joined Al-Washm.

== Career statistics ==
=== Club ===
As of match played 14 July 2020

Club	Season	League		King Cup		Crown Prince Cup		Asia		Other		Total	
Club	Season	Apps	Goals	Apps	Goals	Apps	Goals	Apps	Goals	Apps	Goals	Apps	Goals
Al-Fateh	2017–18	2	0	0	0	1	0	—			—	3	0
Al-Fateh	Total	2	0	0	0	1	0	0	0	0	0	3	0
Career totals		2	0	0	0	1	0	0	0	0	0	3	0
