= Jamaan Al-Dossari (footballer, born 1993) =

Saudi Arabian footballer

Personal information
- Full name: Jamaan Abdullah Al-Dossari
- Date of birth: September 6, 1993 (age 33)
- Place of birth: Saudi Arabia
- Position: Defender

Senior career*
Years	Team	Apps	(Gls)
2015–2017	Al-Shabab	1	(0)
2015–2016	→ Najran SC (loan)	14	(0)
2017	→ Al-Faisaly (loan)	1	(0)
2017–2019	Al-Faisaly	6	(0)
2019	Al-Fateh	6	(0)
2019–2020	Damac	8	(0)
2020–2021	Al-Khaleej	9	(0)
2021–2022	Al-Sahel	36	(0)
2022–2026	Al-Kholood	44	(3)
2025	→ Al-Faisaly (loan)	1	(0)
- * Club domestic league appearances and goals

Jamaan Al-Dossari (Arabic: جُمْعَان عَبْد الله الدَّوْسَرِيّ; born 6 September 1993) is a Saudi Arabian professional footballer who plays as a defender.
