= Hammam Al-Hammami =

Saudi Arabian footballer

Personal information
- Full name: Hammam bin Mabrouk bin Khamis Lahwal Al-Hammami
- Date of birth: 30 January 2004 (age 22)
- Place of birth: Jeddah, Saudi Arabia
- Height: 1.66 m (5 ft 5 in)
- Position: Winger

Team information
- Current team: Al-Shabab
- Number: 22

Youth career
- 2017–2020: West Ham
- 2023: Slavia Prague

Senior career*
Years	Team	Apps	(Gls)
2023	Benešov	10	(1)
2023–2025	Al-Ittihad	3	(0)
2024–2025	→ Al-Kholood (loan)	32	(4)
2025–	Al-Shabab	37	(2)

International career^{‡}
2024–	Saudi Arabia U23		
2025–	Saudi Arabia	5	(1)
Medal record
Men's football
Representing Saudi Arabia
Arabian Gulf Cup
Winner	2026 Saudi Arabia
- * Club domestic league appearances and goals as of 12 September 2026 ‡ National team caps and goals as of 6 October 2026

Hammam Al-Hammami (Arabic: همام الهمامي, romanized: Hammām al-Hammāmiyy; born 30 January 2004) is a Saudi Arabian professional footballer who plays as a winger for Pro League side Al-Shabab and the Saudi Arabia national team.

== Club career ==
Al-Hammami, born in 2004, began his career at West Ham Foundation East London for three U14. He was chosen in the Saudi program to develop football talents established by General Sports Authority. On 23 March 2023 Al-Hammami signed for Czech side Slavia Prague U19. In September 2023, Al-Hammami joined Al-Ittihad's youth team. On 16 January 2024, Al-Hammami signed his first professional contract with Al-Ittihad. On 23 August 2024, Al-Hammami joined newly promoted side Al-Kholood on a one-year loan.

On 28 August 2025, Al-Hammami joined Al-Shabab on a two-year deal.

== International goals ==
As of match played 6 October 2026

Scores and results list Saudi Arabia's goal tally first.

No.	Date	Venue	Opponent	Score	Result	Competition
1.	6 October 2026	King Abdullah Sports City Stadium, Jeddah, Saudi Arabia	United Arab Emirates	1–0	2–0	27th Arabian Gulf Cup

== Honours ==
Saudi Arabia

- Arabian Gulf Cup: 2026

Individual

- Arabian Gulf Cup Player Of The Tournament: 2026
