= Mariano Vázquez (footballer) =

Argentine footballer

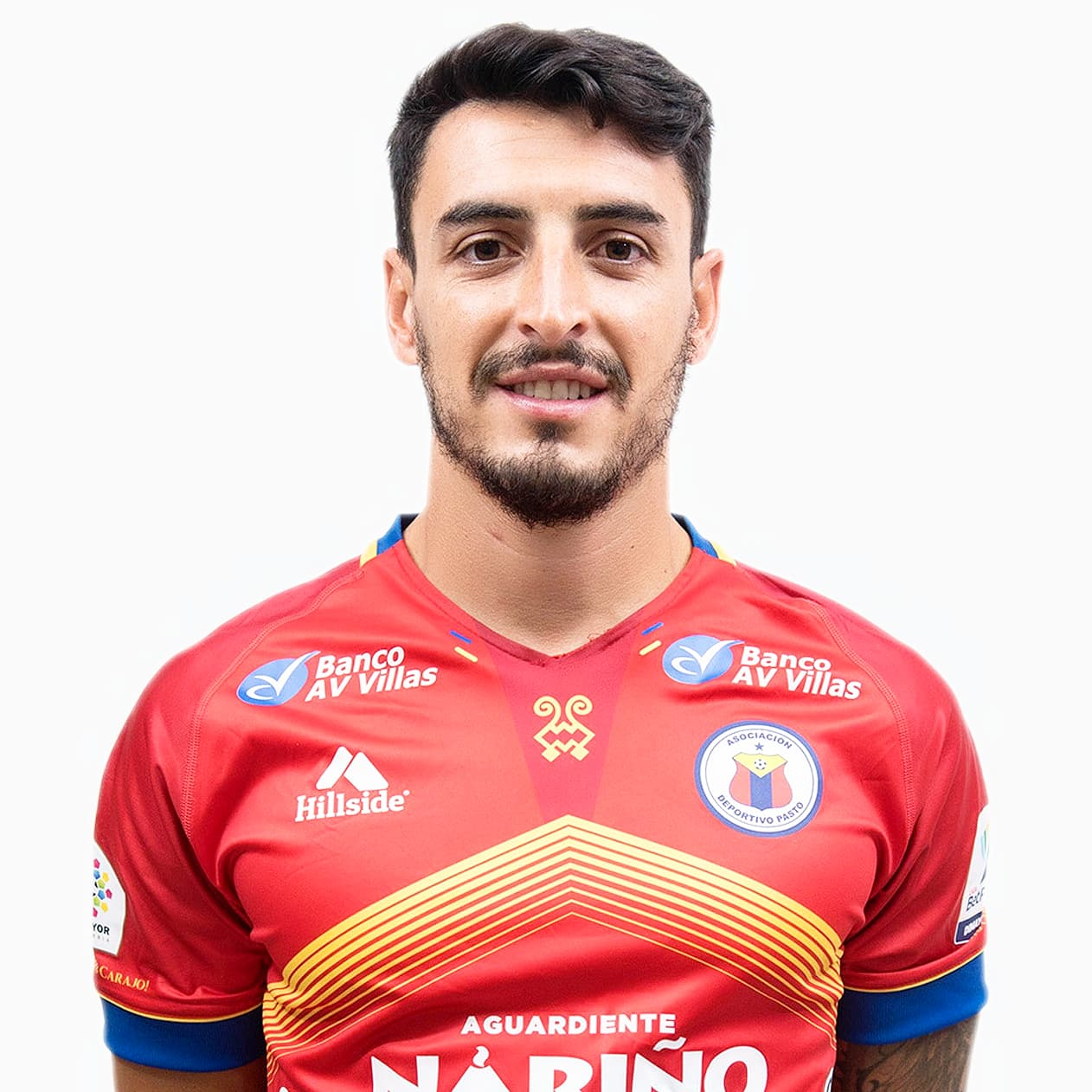
- Vázquez with Deportivo Pasto 2023

Personal information
- Full name: Mariano Vázquez
- Date of birth: 20 December 1992 (age 33)
- Place of birth: Mar del Plata, Argentina
- Height: 1.73 m (5 ft 8 in)
- Position: Midfielder

Senior career*
Years	Team	Apps	(Gls)
2013–2015	Alvarado	22	(0)
2015	Once Tigres	17	(2)
2016	Atlético Huila	10	(0)
2016–2017	Fortaleza C.E.I.F.	16	(1)
2017	Atlético Nacional	7	(0)
2017	Deportes Tolima	12	(0)
2018	La Equidad	17	(2)
2019	Deportivo Pasto	22	(4)
2019–2021	Fortaleza	25	(0)
2021	Melgar	14	(1)
2022	Deportivo Pasto	33	(3)
2023	Al-Faisaly	19	(5)
2023–2024	Al-Kholood	32	(9)
2024–2025	Muaither	12	(0)
- * Club domestic league appearances and goals as of 31 October 2021

Mariano Vázquez (born 20 December 1992) is an Argentine professional footballer who plays as a midfielder.

== Professional career ==
Vázquez began playing football as an amateur in Argentina, before moving to Colombia. Vázquez made his professional debut with Atlético Huila in a 1-0 Categoría Primera A loss to Atlético Junior on 31 January 2016. He most recently plays for Fortaleza in Brazil.

On 7 January 2023, Vázquez joined Saudi Arabian club Al-Faisaly on a six-month contract.

On 8 July 2023, Vázquez joined Al-Kholood.

On 23 July 2024, Vázquez joined Qatari Second Division club Muaither.

== Honours ==
Fortaleza

- Campeonato Cearense: 2020, 2021
