= 2025–26 Al-Nassr FC season =

Al-Nassr
2025–26 season
- President: Abdullah Al-Majid
- Head coach: Jorge Jesus
- Stadium: Al-Awwal Park
- Pro League: 1st
- King's Cup: Round of 16
- Champions League Two: Runners-up
- Super Cup: Runners-up
- Top goalscorer: League: Cristiano Ronaldo (28); All: Cristiano Ronaldo (30)
- Highest home attendance: 26,003 vs Al-Khaleej (23 November 2025); 26,003 vs Al-Najma (3 April 2026); 26,003 vs Al-Ahli (29 April 2026); 26,003 vs Al-Hilal (12 May 2026); 26,003 vs Damac (21 May 2026)
- Lowest home attendance: 3,631 vs Arkadag (18 February 2026)
- Average home league attendance: 20,707
- Biggest win: 5–0 vs Al-Taawoun (29 August 2025); 5–0 vs Istiklol (17 September 2025); 5–0 vs Al-Najma (25 February 2026); 5–0 vs Al-Khaleej (14 March 2026)
- Biggest defeat: 1–3 vs Al-Hilal (12 January 2026); 1–3 vs Al-Qadsiah (3 May 2026)
Home colours	Away colours	Third colours

The 2025–26 season was Al-Nassr's 50th consecutive season in the top flight of Saudi football and 70th year in existence as a football club. The club participated in the Pro League, the King's Cup, the AFC Champions League Two, and the Super Cup.

On 21 May 2026, Al-Nassr were officially crowned champions of the 2025–26 Saudi Pro League after an 4–1 home win against Damac on the final matchday. This was their 11th league title in the club's history, and their first since the 2018–19 season.

== Overview ==
On 2 June 2025, Al-Nassr made their first signing when they signed young midfielder Abdulmalik Al-Jaber. Ali Lajami joined rivals Al-Hilal on a free transfer on 27 May. On 6 July 2025, Jhon Durán was loaned to Süper Lig club Fenerbahçe.

This season saw the appointment of a new head coach Jorge Jesus on 14 July 2025 after the termination of Stefano Pioli's contract. Al-Nassr signed Nader Al-Sharari on a free transfer on 16 July 2025. Al-Nassr signed João Félix from Chelsea and Iñigo Martínez from Barcelona on 29 July and 9 August respectively.

== Players ==
As of 14 September 2025

Note: Flags indicate national team as defined under FIFA eligibility rules; some limited exceptions apply. Players may hold more than one non-FIFA nationality.

No.	Pos.	Nation	Player
1	GK	KSA	Nawaf Al-Aqidi
2	DF	KSA	Sultan Al-Ghannam (vice-captain)
3	DF	FRA	Mohamed Simakan
4	DF	KSA	Nader Al-Sharari
5	DF	KSA	Abdulelah Al-Amri
7	FW	POR	Cristiano Ronaldo (captain)
10	FW	SEN	Sadio Mané
11	MF	CRO	Marcelo Brozović
12	DF	KSA	Nawaf Boushal
14	MF	KSA	Sami Al-Najei
16	FW	KSA	Mohammed Maran
17	MF	KSA	Abdullah Al-Khaibari
19	MF	KSA	Ali Al-Hassan

No.	Pos.	Nation	Player
20	MF	BRA	Ângelo Gabriel
21	FW	FRA	Kingsley Coman
23	MF	KSA	Ayman Yahya
24	GK	BRA	Bento
26	DF	ESP	Iñigo Martínez
29	MF	KSA	Abdulrahman Ghareeb
36	GK	KSA	Raghed Al-Najjar
58	MF	KSA	Abdulmalik Al-Jaber
61	GK	KSA	Mubarak Al-Buainain
77	FW	KSA	Haroune Camara
79	FW	POR	João Félix
80	MF	BRA	Wesley
83	DF	KSA	Salem Al-Najdi
96	DF	KSA	Saad Al-Nasser

=== Out on loan ===
Note: Flags indicate national team as defined under FIFA eligibility rules; some limited exceptions apply. Players may hold more than one non-FIFA nationality.

No.	Pos.	Nation	Player
8	MF	KSA	Abdulmajeed Al-Sulaiheem (at Al-Ula)
9	FW	COL	Jhon Durán (at Fenerbahçe)

No.	Pos.	Nation	Player
50	DF	KSA	Majed Qasheesh (at Al-Fateh)

== Technical staff ==
Jorge Jesus was appointed head coach, and he brought in his coaching staff.

Position	Name
Head coach	(Portugal) Jorge Jesus
Assistant coach	(Portugal) João de Deus (Portugal) Fábio Jesus
Technical director	(Portugal) José Semedo
Goalkeeping coach	(Spain) Tony Mingual
Fitness coach	(Portugal) Márcio Sampaio
Video analyst	(Portugal) Tiago Oliveira (Portugal) Gil Henrique
Technical coach	(Portugal) Rodrigo Araujo
Head doctor	(Portugal) Carlos Miguel
Sporting director	(Portugal) Simão Coutinho
Assistant Sporting Director & Head of Scouts Department	(Spain) Adrián Espárraga
Talent scouting	(Portugal) Marcelo Salazar
Chief scout	(Spain) Rafa Gil
Director of football	(Saudi Arabia) Omar Hawsawi
Club advisor	(Italy) Guido Fienga

== Transfers and loans ==
=== Transfers in ===
Date	Pos.	Player	From	Fee	Source
30 June 2025	GK	(Saudi Arabia) Amin Bukhari	(Saudi Arabia) Damac	End of loan	
30 June 2025	GK	(Saudi Arabia) Nawaf Al-Aqidi	(Saudi Arabia) Al-Fateh	End of loan	
30 June 2025	DF	(Saudi Arabia) Abdulelah Al-Amri	(Saudi Arabia) Al-Ittihad	End of loan	
30 June 2025	DF	(Saudi Arabia) Mansour Al-Shammari	(Saudi Arabia) Al-Jubail	End of loan	
30 June 2025	DF	(Saudi Arabia) Abdulaziz Al-Faraj	(Saudi Arabia) Al-Tai	End of loan	
30 June 2025	DF	(Saudi Arabia) Aser Hawsawi	(Saudi Arabia) Al-Jubail	End of loan	
30 June 2025	DF	(Saudi Arabia) Waleed Saber	(Saudi Arabia) Al-Jeel	End of loan	
30 June 2025	MF	(Saudi Arabia) Fahad Al-Taleb	(Saudi Arabia) Al-Najma	End of loan	
30 June 2025	MF	(Saudi Arabia) Abdulaziz Al-Aliwa	(Saudi Arabia) Al-Ettifaq	End of loan	
30 June 2025	MF	(Saudi Arabia) Rakan Al-Ghamdi	(Netherlands) NEC U21	End of loan	
30 June 2025	FW	(Saudi Arabia) Meshari Al-Nemer	(Saudi Arabia) Damac	End of loan	
30 June 2025	FW	(Saudi Arabia) Muhannad Barrah	(Saudi Arabia) Al-Saqer	End of loan	
30 June 2025	FW	(Saudi Arabia) Fahad Al-Zubaidi	(Saudi Arabia) Al-Orobah	End of loan	
1 July 2025	MF	(Saudi Arabia) Abdulmalik Al-Jaber	(Bosnia and Herzegovina) Željezničar	$1,200,000	
16 July 2025	DF	(Saudi Arabia) Nader Al-Sharari	(Saudi Arabia) Al-Shabab	Free	
29 July 2025	MF	(Portugal) João Félix	(England) Chelsea	$34,650,000	
9 August 2025	DF	(Spain) Iñigo Martínez	(Spain) Barcelona	Free	
16 August 2025	FW	(France) Kingsley Coman	(Germany) Bayern Munich	$30,000,000	
31 August 2025	DF	(Saudi Arabia) Saad Al-Nasser	(Saudi Arabia) Al-Taawoun	$11,500,000	
6 September 2025	FW	(Saudi Arabia) Haroune Camara	(Saudi Arabia) Al-Shabab	$4,000,000	
▼ Spending: $116,000,000

=== Transfers out ===
Date	Pos.	Player	To Club	Fee	Source
30 June 2025	GK	(Saudi Arabia) Ahmed Al-Rehaili	(Saudi Arabia) Al-Ettifaq	End of loan	
1 July 2025	DF	(Saudi Arabia) Ali Lajami	(Saudi Arabia) Al-Hilal	$1,066,000	
12 July 2025	MF	(Saudi Arabia) Mohammed Hazazi	(Saudi Arabia) Al-Ittihad	Free	
26 August 2025	GK	(Saudi Arabia) Amin Bukhari	(Saudi Arabia) Al-Fateh	Free	
26 August 2025	DF	(Saudi Arabia) Abdulaziz Al-Faraj	(Saudi Arabia) Al-Diriyah	$267,000	
27 August 2025	MF	(Saudi Arabia) Abdulaziz Al-Aliwa	(Saudi Arabia) Al-Kholood	$134,000	
27 August 2025	FW	(Saudi Arabia) Fahad Al-Zubaidi	(Saudi Arabia) Al-Fateh	Undisclosed	
1 September 2025	MF	(Saudi Arabia) Fahad Al-Taleb	(Saudi Arabia) Al-Wehda	Free	
9 September 2025	MF	(Portugal) Otávio	(Saudi Arabia) Al-Qadsiah	Free	
11 September 2025	DF	(Spain) Aymeric Laporte	(Spain) Athletic Bilbao	$11,750,000	
11 September 2025	FW	(Saudi Arabia) Meshari Al-Nemer	(Saudi Arabia) Diriyah	$427,000	
▲ Income: $13,644,000

=== Loans out ===
Date	Pos.	Player	To Club	Fee	Source
9 July 2025	FW	(Colombia) Jhon Durán	(Turkey) Fenerbahçe	None	
22 August 2025	MF	(Saudi Arabia) Abdulmajeed Al-Sulaiheem	(Saudi Arabia) Al-Ula	None	
27 August 2025	DF	(Saudi Arabia) Majed Qasheesh	(Saudi Arabia) Al-Fateh	None	
4 September 2025	DF	(Saudi Arabia) Aser Hawsawi	(Saudi Arabia) Al-Arabi	None	
▲ Income: None

== Pre-season and friendlies ==
26 July 2025 Friendly	Al-Nassr (Saudi Arabia)	5–2	(Austria) SK St. Johann	Saalfelden, Austria
15:30 CEST	Mané 25'; Ghareeb 36' (pen.); Simakan 53'; Al-Sulaiheem 73'; Kos 82' (o.g.)	Report	Seeber 15'; Cissé 86'	Stadium: 1508 Saalfelden Arena

30 July 2025 Friendly	Al-Nassr (Saudi Arabia)	2–1	(France) Toulouse	Grödig, Austria
17:30 CEST	Ronaldo 33'; Maran 76'	Report	Gboho 25'	Stadium: Untersberg-Arena

7 August 2025 Friendly	Al-Nassr (Saudi Arabia)	4–0	(Portugal) Rio Ave	Algarve, Portugal
21:00 CEST	Simakan 15'; Ronaldo 44', 63', 68' (pen.)	Report		Stadium: Estádio Algarve

10 August 2025 Friendly	UD Almería (Spain)	3–2	(Saudi Arabia) Al-Nassr	Almería, Spain
19:00 CEST	Arribas 6'; Embarba 43', 61'	Report	Ronaldo 17', 39' (pen.)	Stadium: UD Almería Stadium

10 December 2025 Friendly	Al Wahda (United Arab Emirates)	2–4	(Saudi Arabia) Al-Nassr	Abu Dhabi, United Arab Emirates
19:30 UTC+4	Kruspzky 22'; Tadic 36' (pen.)	Report	Ronaldo 12'; Coman 30'; H. Camara 56'; S. Al Nasser 78'	Stadium: Al Nahyan Stadium; Attendance: 15.000

== Competitions ==
=== Overview ===
Competition	First match	Last match	Starting round	Final position	Record							
Competition	First match	Last match	Starting round	Final position	Pld	W	D	L	GF	GA	GD	Win %
Pro League	29 August 2025	21 May 2026	Matchday 1	Winners	34	28	2	4	91	28	+63	82.35
King's Cup	23 September 2025	28 October 2025	Round of 32	Round of 16	2	1	0	1	5	2	+3	50.00
Champions League Two	17 September 2025	16 May 2026	Group stage	Runners-up	11	10	0	1	33	4	+29	90.91
Super Cup	19 August 2025	23 August 2025	Semi-finals	Runners-up	2	1	1	0	4	3	+1	50.00
Total					49	40	3	6	133	37	+96	81.63

Source: Competitions

=== Pro League ===
==== League table ====
Pos	Team	Pld	W	D	L	GF	GA	GD	Pts	Qualification or relegation
1	Al-Nassr (C)	34	28	2	4	91	28	+63	86	Qualification for AFC Champions League Elite league stage (Note: Al-Ahli also qualified as 2025–26 AFC Champions League Elite winners.)
2	Al-Hilal	34	25	9	0	85	27	+58	84	Qualification for AFC Champions League Elite league stage
3	Al-Ahli	34	25	6	3	71	25	+46	81	Qualification for AFC Champions League Elite league stage
4	Al-Qadsiah	34	23	8	3	83	34	+49	77	Qualification for AFC Champions League Elite league stage
5	Al-Ittihad	34	16	7	11	55	48	+7	55	Qualification for AFC Champions League Elite preliminary stage

Source: SPL
Rules for classification: 1) Points; 2) Head-to-head points; 3) Head-to-head goal difference; 4) Total goal difference; 5) Total goals scored; 6) Fair-play points
(Note: Head-to-head record is used only after all the matches between the teams in question have been played).
(C) Champions

==== Results summary ====
Overall								Home						Away					
Pld	W	D	L	GF	GA	GD	Pts	W	D	L	GF	GA	GD	W	D	L	GF	GA	GD
34	28	2	4	91	28	+63	86	15	1	1	46	12	+34	13	1	3	45	16	+29

Source: Saudi Pro League

==== Results by round ====
Round	1	2	3	4	5	6	7	8	9	11	12	13	14	15	16	17	18	19	20	21	22	23	10	24	25	26	27	28	29	30	31	32	33	34
Ground	A	H	H	A	H	A	H	A	H	H	A	A	H	A	H	A	H	A	A	H	A	H	A	A	H	A	H	A	H	H	A	A	H	H
Result	W	W	W	W	W	W	W	W	W	W	D	L	L	L	W	W	W	W	W	W	W	W	W	W	W	W	W	W	W	W	L	W	D	W
Position	1	1	1	1	1	1	1	1	1	1	1	2	2	2	2	2	2	2	2	2	2	1	1	1	1	1	1	1	1	1	1	1	1	1

Source: Saudi Pro League
A = Away; H = Home; W = Win; D = Draw; L = Loss

==== Matches ====
All times are local, SAST (UTC+03:00).

Win Draw Loss Postponed

29 August 2025 1	Al-Taawoun	0–5	Al-Nassr	Buraydah
21:00	Martínez (yellow card) 16'; Flávio (yellow card) 35'; Al-Jumayah (yellow card) 84'	Report	Félix 7', 67', 87'; Ronaldo 54' (pen.); Coman 55'; Yahya (yellow card) 61'	Stadium: King Abdullah Sports City; Attendance: 11,313; Referee: Abdullah Al-Shehri

14 September 2025 2	Al-Nassr	2–0	Al-Kholood	Riyadh
21:00	Mané 52'; Al-Ghannam (yellow card) 73'; Martinez 81'; Al-Khaibari (yellow card) 90+5'	Report	Buckley (yellow card) 83'; Enrique (yellow card) 90+3'	Stadium: Al-Awwal Park; Attendance: 18,095; Referee: Ricardo de Burgos Bengoetxea (Spain)

20 September 2025 3	Al-Nassr	5–1	Al-Riyadh	Riyadh
21:00	Félix 6', 49'; Coman 30'; Ronaldo 33', 76'; Mané (yellow card) 45+1'; Martinez (yellow card) 54'	Report	Sylla 51'	Stadium: Al-Awwal Park; Attendance: 16,174; Referee: Urs Schnyder (Switzerland)

26 September 2025 4	Al-Ittihad	0–2	Al-Nassr	Jeddah
21:00	Bergwijn (yellow card) 80'; Sharahili (yellow card) 82'	Report	Mané 9'; Ronaldo 35'	Stadium: Alinma Stadium; Attendance: 53,282; Referee: Donatas Rumšas (Lithuania)

18 October 2025 5	Al-Nassr	5–1	Al-Fateh	Riyadh
21:00	Félix 13', 68', 79'; Mané (yellow card) 47'; Ronaldo 60', (yellow card) 62'; Coman 75'	Report	Toko Ekambi (yellow card) 39'; Bendebka 54'; Vargas (yellow card) 81'	Stadium: Al-Awwal Park; Attendance: 18,763; Referee: Abdullah Al-Shehri

25 October 2025 6	Al-Hazem	0–2	Al-Nassr	Buraydah
21:00	Al Somah (yellow card) 33'; Al-Dakheel (yellow card) 44'; Al-Nakhli (yellow card) 48'	Report	Mané (yellow card) 13'; Al-Khaibari (yellow card) 24'; Félix 25'; Ronaldo 88'	Stadium: King Abdullah Sports City; Attendance: 10,520; Referee: Faisal Al-Blwi

1 November 2025 7	Al-Nassr	2–1	Al-Fayha	Riyadh
20:30	Ronaldo 37', 90+14' (pen.); Brozović (yellow card) 43'; Félix (yellow card) 63'	Report	Jason 13'; Al-Baqawi (yellow card) 22'; Al-Harthi (yellow card) 28'	Stadium: Al-Awwal Park; Attendance: 16,242; Referee: Mohammed Al-Hoaish

8 November 2025 8	Neom	1–3	Al-Nassr	Tabuk
16:50	Doucouré (yellow card) 6'; Rodríguez (red card) 56'; Zézé (yellow card) 72'; Abdu Jaber 84'	Report	Ângelo (yellow card) 30', (goal) 47'; Ronaldo 65' (pen.); Al-Ghannam (yellow card) 73'; Félix 86'	Stadium: King Khalid Sports City Stadium; Attendance: 7,652; Referee: Abdullah Al-Shehri

23 November 2025 9	Al-Nassr	4–1	Al-Khaleej	Riyadh
20:30	Brozović (yellow card) 9'; Félix 39'; Wesley 42'; Yahya (yellow card) 56'; Mané 77', (yellow card) 82'; Ronaldo 90+6'	Report	Hawsawi (yellow card) 4', (goal) 47'; Kourbelis (red card) 90'	Stadium: Al-Awwal Park; Attendance: 26,003; Referee: Mohammed Al-Ismail

27 December 2025 11	Al-Nassr	3–0	Al-Okhdood	Riyadh
17:50	Ronaldo 31', 45+3'; Félix 90+4'	Report	Al-Rubaie (yellow card) 61'; Al-Harthi (yellow card) 90+2'	Stadium: Al-Awwal Park; Attendance: 19,472; Referee: Faisal Al-Blwi

30 December 2025 12	Al-Ettifaq	2–2	Al-Nassr	Dammam
20:30	Wijnaldum 16', 80'; Al-Ghamdi (yellow card) 45+1'	Report	Wesley (yellow card) 2'; Al-Nasser (yellow card) 10'; Félix 47'; Ronaldo 67'	Stadium: EGO Stadium; Attendance: 9,512; Referee: Shukri Al-Hanfosh

2 January 2026 13	Al-Ahli	3–2	Al-Nassr	Jeddah
20:30	Toney 7', 20'; Demiral 55', (yellow card) 90+12'; Atangana (yellow card) 66'; Al-Sanbi (yellow card) 79'; Abu Al-Shamat (yellow card) 90+4'; Majrashi (red card) 90+6'	Report	Al-Amri 31', 44'; Yahya (yellow card) 61'; Martinez (yellow card) 89'; Félix (yellow card) 90+6'; Boushal (red card) 90+9'	Stadium: Alinma Stadium; Attendance: 41,315; Referee: Irfan Peljto (Bosnia and Herzegovina)

8 January 2026 14	Al-Nassr	1–2	Al-Qadsiah	Riyadh
20:30	Ângelo (yellow card) 59'; Ronaldo 81' (pen.); Brozović (yellow card) 85'	Report	Nacho (yellow card) 39'; Quiñones 51'; Nández 66', (yellow card) 79'; Bonsu Baah (yellow card) 69'; Álvarez (yellow card) 70'; Hazazi (yellow card) 87'; Abu Al-Shamat (yellow card) 90+11'	Stadium: Al-Awwal Park; Attendance: 25,827; Referee: István Kovács (Romania)

12 January 2026 15	Al-Hilal	3–1	Al-Nassr	Riyadh
20:30	S. Al-Dawsari 57' (pen.); Neves (yellow card) 58', (goal) 90+2' (pen.); Kanno 81'	Report	Ronaldo 42'; Brozović (yellow card) 53'; Al-Aqidi (red card) 60'; Al-Khaibari (yellow card) 65'	Stadium: Kingdom Arena; Attendance: 24,060; Referee: François Letexier (France)

17 January 2026 16	Al-Nassr	3–2	Al-Shabab	Riyadh
20:30	Balobaid 2' (o.g.); Coman 8', (yellow card) 60'; Ghareeb 76'; Al-Ghannam (yellow card) 90+4'; Félix (yellow card) 90+4'	Report	Simakan 31' (o.g.); Carlos Junior 53'; Sierro (yellow card) 61' (yellow-red card) 67'; Brownhill (yellow card) 90+5'	Stadium: Al-Awwal Park; Attendance: 13,388; Referee: Mohammed Al-Hoaish

21 January 2026 17	Damac	1–2	Al-Nassr	Abha
20:30	Harkass 68'	Report	Ghareeb 5', (yellow card) 80'; Ronaldo 50'; Ângelo (yellow card) 82'	Stadium: Prince Sultan bin Abdulaziz Sports City Stadium; Attendance: 12,678; Referee: Abdullah Al-Kharboush

26 January 2026 18	Al-Nassr	1–0	Al-Taawoun	Riyadh
20:30	Al-Nasser (yellow card) 10'; Brozović (yellow card) 33'; Al-Dossari 45' (o.g.); Al-Khaibari (yellow card) 45+5'; Simakan (yellow card) 90+1'; Boushal (yellow card) 90+4'	Report	Al-Mufarrij (yellow card) 31'; Al-Alaeli (yellow card) 46'; Al-Ahmed (yellow card) 90+1'; Mahzari (yellow card) 90+4'; El Mahdioui (yellow card) 90+6'	Stadium: Al-Awwal Park; Attendance: 15,425; Referee: Majed Al-Shamrani

30 January 2026 19	Al-Kholood	0–3	Al-Nassr	Buraydah
20:30	Bahebri (yellow card) 45+1', (red card) 72'	Report	Martinez (yellow card) 22'; Ronaldo 47'; Simakan 53'; Coman 87' (pen.)	Stadium: King Abdullah Sports City; Attendance: 11,481; Referee: Abdullah Al-Owaydan

2 February 2026 20	Al-Riyadh	0–1	Al-Nassr	Riyadh
20:30	Soro (yellow card) 10'; Ali Harun (yellow card) 45+2'; Al-Harfi (yellow card) 78'; Tozé (red card) 90+9'	Report	Mané 40'; Al-Hassan (yellow card) 52'	Stadium: Prince Faisal bin Fahd Sports City; Attendance: 4,597; Referee: Khalid Saleh Al-Turais

6 February 2026 21	Al-Nassr	2–0	Al-Ittihad	Riyadh
20:30	Mané 84' (pen.); Coman (yellow card) 86'; Ângelo 90+6'; Al-Amri (yellow card) 90+6'	Report	Al-Julaydan (yellow card) 28'; Fabinho (yellow card) 49'; Al-Ghamdi (yellow card) 62'; Pereira (yellow card) 82'	Stadium: Al-Awwal Park; Attendance: 24,604; Referee: Slavko Vinčić (Slovenia)

14 February 2026 22	Al-Fateh	0–2	Al-Nassr	Al-Hasa
20:30	Masoud (yellow card) 64'	Report	Ronaldo 18'; Al-Khaibari (yellow card) 49'; Yahya 80'; Martinez (yellow card) 88'	Stadium: Al-Fateh Club Stadium; Attendance: 11,220; Referee: Ahmad Al-Rumaikhani

21 February 2026 23	Al-Nassr	4–0	Al-Hazem	Riyadh
22:00	Ronaldo 13', 80'; Coman 30'; Simakan (yellow card) 59'; Ângelo (yellow card) 62', (goal) 77'	Report	Bah (yellow card) 54'; Martins (yellow card) 82'	Stadium: Al-Awwal Park; Attendance: 11,623; Referee: Mohammed Sami Taher Al-Ismail

25 February 2026 10	Al-Najma	0–5	Al-Nassr	Unaizah
22:00	Al-Hawsawi (yellow card) 6'; Al-Harabi (yellow card) 27'	Report	Ronaldo 7' (pen.); Mané (yellow card) 26', (goal) 52'; Coman 31'; Martinez 42', 80'; Al-Hassan (yellow card) 90+2'	Stadium: Al-Najma Club Stadium; Attendance: 8,646; Referee: Majed Al-Shamrani
Note: The match, initially scheduled for 21 December 2025, was postponed to February 2026 due to Saudi Arabia's involvement in the 2025 FIFA Arab Cup knockout stage.

28 February 2026 24	Al-Fayha	1–3	Al-Nassr	Buraydah
22:00	Al-Baqawi (yellow card) 25'; Bamsaud (yellow card) 34'; Al-Amri 45+2' (o.g.); Semedo (yellow card) 90+4'; Al-Rashidi (yellow card) 90+5'	Report	Ronaldo (penalty missed); Boushal (yellow card) 37'; Mané 72'; Mosquera 80' (o.g.); Al-Hamdan 85'	Stadium: King Abdullah Sports City; Attendance: 4,147; Referee: Abdullah Fahad Abdalaziz Al-Owaydan

7 March 2026 25	Al-Nassr	1–0	Neom	Riyadh
22:00	Brozović (yellow card) 27'; Martínez (yellow card) 87'; Ghareeb (yellow card) 90'; Simakan 90+5'	Report	Al-Hejji (yellow card) 24'; Koné (yellow card) 33'	Stadium: Al-Awwal Park; Attendance: 16,567; Referee: Khalid Saleh Al Turais

14 March 2026 26	Al-Khaleej	0–5	Al-Nassr	Dammam
22:00	Al-Hamsal (yellow card) 40'	Report	Al-Hamdan 30'; Félix (yellow card) 48', (goal) 73', 79'; Yahya 54', (yellow card) 76'; Ângelo 90+2'	Stadium: Prince Mohamed bin Fahd Stadium; Attendance: 17,332; Referee: Shukri Al-Hanfosh

3 April 2026 27	Al-Nassr	5–2	Al-Najma	Riyadh
22:00	Al-Hamdan 45+8'; Mané 45+9', 90+5'; Ronaldo 56' (pen.), 73'; Brozović (yellow card) 59'; Ghareeb (yellow card) 85'	Report	Al-Tulayhi (yellow card) 20', (goal) 44'; Al-Haleel (yellow card) 52'; Cardoso 47'	Stadium: Al-Awwal Park; Attendance: 26,003; Referee: Abdullah Atif Abdulrhman Al Shehri

11 April 2026 28	Al-Okhdood	0–2	Al-Nassr	Najran
22:00	Al-Lazam (yellow card) 56'; Al-Harthi (yellow card) 87'	Report	Ronaldo 15'; Simakan (yellow card) 45+2'; Félix 47', (yellow card) 74'	Stadium: Prince Hathloul bin Abdulaziz Sports City; Attendance: 6,414; Referee: Khalid Saleh Al Turais

15 April 2026 29	Al-Nassr	1–0	Al-Ettifaq	Riyadh
22:00	Coman 31'	Report	Medrán (yellow card) 82'; Hendry (red card) 90+4'	Stadium: Al-Awwal Park; Attendance: 25,832; Referee: Faisal Alblwi

29 April 2026 30	Al-Nassr	2–0	Al-Ahli	Riyadh
21:00	Al-Amri (yellow card) 12'; Ronaldo 79'; Coman 90', (yellow card) 90+9'; Yahya (yellow card) 90+3'	Report	Atangana (yellow card) 18'; Al-Johani (yellow card) 45+4'; Demiral (yellow card) 52'; Toney (yellow card) 90+2'	Stadium: Al-Awwal Park; Attendance: 26,003; Referee: Erik Lambrechts (Belgium)

3 May 2026 31	Al-Qadsiah	3–1	Al-Nassr	Dammam
21:00	Abu Al-Shamat 24'; Otávio (yellow card) 46'; Al-Juwayr 55'; Quiñones 78'	Report	Félix 39', (yellow card) 49'; Martínez (yellow card) 41'; Yahya (yellow card) 89'	Stadium: Prince Mohamed bin Fahd Stadium; Attendance: 17,825; Referee: Harm Osmers (Germany)

7 May 2026 32	Al-Shabab	2–4	Al-Nassr	Riyadh
21:00	Carrasco 30'; Al-Bulayhi 80'; Balobaid (yellow card) 85'; Grohe (yellow card) 90+6'	Report	Félix 3', 10', 90+8' (pen.); Ronaldo 75'; Al-Najdi (yellow card) 90+9'	Stadium: Al-Shabab Club Stadium; Attendance: 8,509; Referee: Vassilis Fotias (Greece)

12 May 2026 33	Al-Nassr	1–1	Al-Hilal	Riyadh
21:00	Al-Hassan (yellow card) 21'; Al-Amri (yellow card) 25'; Simakan 37'; Félix (yellow card) 75'; Yahya (yellow card) 81'	Report	Al-Tambakti (yellow card) 29'; Milinković-Savić (yellow card) 64'; Hernandez (yellow card) 90+2'; Bento 90+8' (o.g.)	Stadium: Al-Awwal Park; Attendance: 26,003; Referee: Donatas Rumšas (Lithuania)

21 May 2026 34	Al-Nassr	4–1	Damac	Riyadh
21:00	Mané 34', (yellow card) 60'; Coman 52'; Ronaldo (yellow card) 54', (goal) 62', 80'	Report	Hawsawi (yellow card) 25'; Al-Anazi (yellow card) 26'; Sylla 58' (pen.); Harkass (yellow card) 62'; Abdu (yellow card) 71'	Stadium: Al-Awwal Park; Attendance: 26,003; Referee: Khalid Saleh Al Turais

=== King's Cup ===
All times are local, SAST (UTC+03:00).

23 September 2025 Round of 32	Jeddah	0–4	Al-Nassr	Jeddah
21:30		Report	Othman 8' (o.g.); Wesley 61'; Félix 71'; Simakan 89'	Stadium: Prince Abdullah Al-Faisal Sports City; Attendance: 3,243; Referee: Abdullah Al-Owaidan

28 October 2025 Round of 16	Al-Nassr	1–2	Al-Ittihad	Riyadh
21:00	Al-Khaibari (yellow card) 14'; Ângelo 30'; Simakan (yellow card) 38'	Report	Fabinho (yellow card) 10'; Benzema 15'; Aouar (yellow card) 38', (goal) 45+2'; Al-Julaydan (red card) 49'	Stadium: Al-Awwal Park; Attendance: 23,649; Referee: Khalid Al-Turais

=== AFC Champions League Two ===
==== Group stage ====
Pos	Team	Pld	W	D	L	GF	GA	GD	Pts	Qualification	NSR	ZWR	IST	GOA
1	(Saudi Arabia) Al-Nassr	6	6	0	0	22	2	+20	18	Advance to round of 16	—	5–1	5–0	4–0
2	(Iraq) Al-Zawraa	6	3	0	3	8	11	−3	9	Advance to round of 16	0–2	—	2–1	2–1
3	(Tajikistan) Istiklol	6	3	0	3	7	13	−6	9		0–4	2–1	—	2–0
4	(India) Goa	6	0	0	6	3	14	−11	0		1–2	0–2	1–2	—

Source: ACL2
Rules for classification: Tiebreakers

17 September 2025 1	Al-Nassr (Saudi Arabia)	5–0	(Tajikistan) Istiklol	Riyadh, Saudi Arabia
21:15 UTC+3	Al-Amri (yellow card) 8'; Ghareeb 14'; Ângelo 17'; Wesley 59', (yellow card) 81'; Coman 89'; Mané 90+3'	Report	Okoro (yellow card) 49'; Jalilov (yellow card) 51'	Stadium: Al-Awwal Park; Attendance: 6,038; Referee: Ko Hyung-jin (South Korea)

1 October 2025 2	Al-Zawraa (Iraq)	0–2	(Saudi Arabia) Al-Nassr	Baghdad, Iraq
21:15 UTC+3	Falah (yellow card) 39'; Jabbar (yellow card) 71'	Report	Al-Khaibari 52'; Félix 82'; Mané (yellow card) 90'; Simakan (yellow card) 90+7'	Stadium: Al-Zawraa Stadium; Attendance: 14,125; Referee: Salman Falahi (Qatar)

22 October 2025 3	Goa (India)	1–2	(Saudi Arabia) Al-Nassr	Margao, India
19:30 UTC+5:30	Herrera (yellow card) 39'; Fernandes 41'; Timor (red card) 90+2'	Report	Ângelo 10'; Camara 27'; Wesley (yellow card) 90+5'	Stadium: Jawaharlal Nehru Stadium; Attendance: 14,389; Referee: Adel Al-Naqbi (United Arab Emirates)

5 November 2025 4	Al-Nassr (Saudi Arabia)	4–0	(India) Goa	Riyadh, Saudi Arabia
21:15 UTC+3	Ghareeb 35', 53'; Al-Hassan (yellow card) 56'; Maran 65'; Félix 84'; Al-Ghannam (yellow card) 90+3'	Report		Stadium: Al-Awwal Park; Attendance: 6,736; Referee: Kim Hee-gon (South Korea)

26 November 2025 5	Istiklol (Tajikistan)	0–4	(Saudi Arabia) Al-Nassr	Hisor, Tajikistan
18:45 UTC+5	Okoro (yellow card) 18'	Report	Félix 12' (pen.); Simakan 40'; Mané 84'; Al-Ghannam (yellow card) 90'; Yahya 90+2'	Stadium: Hisor Central Stadium; Attendance: 15,150; Referee: Alex King (Australia)

24 December 2025 6	Al-Nassr (Saudi Arabia)	5–1	(Iraq) Al-Zawraa	Riyadh, Saudi Arabia
19:00 UTC+3	Coman 12', 56'; Wesley 19'; Al-Amri 29'; Félix 44'	Report	Gbadamosi 50'	Stadium: Al-Awwal Park; Attendance: 8,575; Referee: Fu Ming (China)

==== Knockout stage ====
===== Round of 16 =====
11 February 2026 Round of 16; First leg	Arkadag (Turkmenistan)	0–1	(Saudi Arabia) Al-Nassr	Arkadag, Turkmenistan
18:45 UTC+5	Hydyrow (yellow card) 23'; Ballakov (yellow card) 45+1'	Report	Al-Hamdan 19'	Stadium: Arkadag Stadium; Attendance: 45,000; Referee: Ammar Mahfoodh (Bahrain)

18 February 2026 Round of 16; Second leg	Al-Nassr (Saudi Arabia)	1–0 (2–0 agg.)	(Turkmenistan) Arkadag	Riyadh, Saudi Arabia
21:15 UTC+3	Ghareeb 2'	Report	Annagulyýew (red card) 87'	Stadium: Al-Awwal Park; Attendance: 3,631; Referee: Payam Heydari (Iran)

===== Quarter-finals =====
19 April 2026 Quarter-finals	Al Wasl (United Arab Emirates)	0–4	(Saudi Arabia) Al-Nassr	Dubai, United Arab Emirates
18:00 UTC+4	Borja (yellow card) 29'; Hugo (yellow card) 43'; Vareta (yellow card) 45+1'; Tapia (yellow card) 52'	Report	Ronaldo 11'; Martínez 24', (yellow card) 84'; Al-Amri 26'; Mané 80'; Simakan (yellow card) 90'	Stadium: Zabeel Stadium; Attendance: 7,030; Referee: Rustam Lutfullin (Uzbekistan)
Note: Originally scheduled for 3 March 2026, the match was postponed due to the impacts of the 2026 Iran war.

===== Semi-finals =====
22 April 2026 Semi-finals	Al-Nassr (Saudi Arabia)	5–1	(Qatar) Al Ahli	Dubai, United Arab Emirates
20:00 UTC+4	Martínez (yellow card) 4'; Coman 12', 45+8', 63'; Ângelo 23'; Simakan (yellow card) 54'; Al-Hamdan 80'	Report	Draxler (penalty missed) 7'; Yansané 10'; Diallo (yellow card) 85'	Stadium: Zabeel Stadium; Attendance: 5,955; Referee: Choi Hyun-jai (South Korea)

===== Final =====
16 May 2026 Final	Al-Nassr (Saudi Arabia)	0–1	(Japan) Gamba Osaka	Riyadh, Saudi Arabia
20:45 UTC+3	Ghareeb (yellow card) 64'	Report	Hümmet 30'	Stadium: Al-Awwal Park; Attendance: 25,207; Referee: Abdullah Jamali (Kuwait)

=== Super Cup ===
19 August 2025 Semi-finals	Al-Nassr	2–1	Al-Ittihad	So Kon Po, Hong Kong
20:00 UTC+8	Mané 10', (red card) 25'; Félix 61'; Wesley (yellow card) 90+2'; Brozović (yellow card) 90+6'	Report	Bergwijn 16'; Fabinho (yellow card) 45+1'; Al-Shanqeeti (yellow card) 53'; F. Al-Ghamdi (yellow card) 90+2'	Stadium: Hong Kong Stadium; Attendance: 30,653; Referee: Khalid Al-Turais

23 August 2025 Final	Al-Nassr	2–2 (3–5 p)	Al-Ahli	So Kon Po, Hong Kong
20:00 UTC+8	Wesley (yellow card) 30'; Ronaldo 41' (pen.); Brozović (yellow card) 53', (goal) 82'; Boushal (yellow card) 90+3'	Report	Toney (yellow card) 12'; Kessié (yellow card) 39', (goal) 45+6'; Demiral (yellow card) 51'; Dams (yellow card) 74'; Ibañez 89'	Stadium: Hong Kong Stadium; Attendance: 30,240; Referee: Mohammed Al-Hoaish
	Penalties
	Ronaldo (penalty scored); Brozović (penalty scored); Félix (penalty scored); Al-Khaibari (penalty missed)		(penalty scored) Toney; (penalty scored) Kessié; (penalty scored) Mahrez; (penalty scored) Al-Buraikan; (penalty scored) Galeno

== Statistics ==
=== Appearances ===
Last updated on 30 January 2026.

No.	Pos	Nat	Player	Total		Pro League		King's Cup		ACL Two		Super Cup	
No.	Pos	Nat	Player	Apps	Goals	Apps	Goals	Apps	Goals	Apps	Goals	Apps	Goals
Goalkeepers
1	GK	(Saudi Arabia) KSA	Nawaf Al-Aqidi	11	0	11	0	0	0	0	0	0	0
24	GK	(Brazil) BRA	Bento	14	0	5	0	2	0	5	0	2	0
36	GK	(Saudi Arabia) KSA	Raghed Al-Najjar	3	0	2	0	0	0	1	0	0	0
61	GK	(Saudi Arabia) KSA	Mubarak Al-Buainain	1	0	0+1	0	0	0	0	0	0	0
Defenders
2	DF	(Saudi Arabia) KSA	Sultan Al-Ghannam	28	0	13+5	0	1+1	0	5+1	0	0+2	0
3	DF	(France) FRA	Mohamed Simakan	20	3	13	1	1+1	1	1+2	1	2	0
4	DF	(Saudi Arabia) KSA	Nader Al-Sharari	5	0	0+3	0	0	0	1+1	0	0	0
5	DF	(Saudi Arabia) KSA	Abdulelah Al-Amri	18	3	5+5	2	1+1	0	6	1	0	0
12	DF	(Saudi Arabia) KSA	Nawaf Boushal	25	0	10+6	0	2	0	2+3	0	2	0
26	DF	(Spain) ESP	Iñigo Martínez	26	1	18	1	2	0	3+1	0	2	0
70	MF	(Saudi Arabia) KSA	Awad Aman	0	0	0	0	0	0	0	0	0	0
83	DF	(Saudi Arabia) KSA	Salem Al-Najdi	9	0	0+6	0	0	0	2+1	0	0	0
96	DF	(Saudi Arabia) KSA	Saad Al-Nasser	11	0	5+4	0	0	0	2	0	0	0
Midfielders
11	MF	(Croatia) CRO	Marcelo Brozović	23	1	15	0	0+1	0	3+2	0	2	1
17	MF	(Saudi Arabia) KSA	Abdullah Al-Khaibari	27	1	6+11	0	2	0	3+3	1	2	0
18	MF	(Saudi Arabia) KSA	Abdulmalik Al-Jaber	0	0	0	0	0	0	0	0	0	0
19	MF	(Saudi Arabia) KSA	Ali Al-Hassan	24	0	1+15	0	1+1	0	3+2	0	0+1	0
20	MF	(Brazil) BRA	Ângelo Gabriel	26	4	16	1	2	1	5+1	2	0+2	0
23	MF	(Saudi Arabia) KSA	Ayman Yahya	19	1	8+4	0	1+1	0	2+1	1	2	0
29	MF	(Saudi Arabia) KSA	Abdulrahman Ghareeb	17	5	1+11	2	1	0	3+1	3	0	0
56	MF	(Saudi Arabia) KSA	Rakan Al-Ghamdi	1	0	0	0	0	0	0+1	0	0	0
79	MF	(Portugal) POR	João Félix	28	19	18	13	1+1	1	4+2	4	2	1
Forwards
7	FW	(Portugal) POR	Cristiano Ronaldo	22	18	18	17	1	0	1	0	2	1
10	FW	(Senegal) SEN	Sadio Mané	19	6	11	3	1+1	0	1+4	2	1	1
16	FW	(Saudi Arabia) KSA	Mohammed Maran	6	1	0+2	0	0	0	3+1	1	0	0
21	FW	(France) FRA	Kingsley Coman	24	8	17	5	1+1	0	2+1	3	2	0
60	FW	(Saudi Arabia) KSA	Saad Haqawi	0	0	0	0	0	0	0	0	0	0
77	FW	(Saudi Arabia) KSA	Haroune Camara	7	1	0+2	0	1	0	3+1	1	0	0
Players sent out on loan this season
80	MF	(Brazil) BRA	Wesley	18	4	5+4	1	1+1	1	5	2	1+1	0
Player who made an appearance this season but have left the club
30	FW	(Saudi Arabia) KSA	Meshari Al-Nemer	0	0	0	0	0	0	0	0	0	0
46	MF	(Saudi Arabia) KSA	Abdulaziz Al-Aliwa	0	0	0	0	0	0	0	0	0	0

=== Goalscorers ===
Rank	No.	Pos.	Nat.	Player	Pro League	King's Cup	ACL Two	Super Cup	Total
1	7	FW	(Portugal)	Cristiano Ronaldo	28	0	1	1	30
2	79	MF	(Portugal)	João Félix	16	1	4	1	22
3	10	FW	(Senegal)	Sadio Mané	6	0	4	1	11
4	21	FW	(France)	Kingsley Coman	6	0	4	0	10
5	20	MF	(Brazil)	Ângelo Gabriel	3	1	2	0	5
6	29	MF	(Saudi Arabia)	Abdulrahman Ghareeb	2	0	3	0	5
6	80	MF	(Brazil)	Wesley	1	1	2	0	4
8	5	DF	(Saudi Arabia)	Abdulelah Al-Amri	1	1	3	0	5
8	3	DF	(France)	Mohamed Simakan	3	0	1	0	4
10	11	MF	(Croatia)	Marcelo Brozović	0	0	0	1	1
10	16	FW	(Saudi Arabia)	Mohammed Maran	0	0	1	0	1
10	17	MF	(Saudi Arabia)	Abdullah Al-Khaibari	0	0	1	0	1
10	23	MF	(Saudi Arabia)	Ayman Yahya	0	0	1	0	1
10	26	DF	(Spain)	Iñigo Martínez	1	0	0	0	1
10	77	FW	(Saudi Arabia)	Haroune Camara	0	0	1	0	1
Own goal					2	1	0	0	3
Total					48	5	22	4	79

Last Updated: 30 January 2026

=== Assists ===
Rank	No.	Pos.	Nat.	Player	Pro League	King's Cup	ACL Two	Super Cup	Total
1	79	MF	(Portugal)	João Félix	6	1	2	0	9
2	21	FW	(France)	Kingsley Coman	6	0	1	0	7
3	10	FW	(Senegal)	Sadio Mané	4	1	1	0	6
3	20	MF	(Brazil)	Ângelo Gabriel	4	0	2	0	6
5	11	MF	(Croatia)	Marcelo Brozović	3	0	0	1	4
5	29	MF	(Saudi Arabia)	Abdulrahman Ghareeb	0	1	3	0	4
7	7	FW	(Portugal)	Cristiano Ronaldo	1	0	1	1	3
7	12	DF	(Saudi Arabia)	Nawaf Boushal	3	0	0	0	3
9	2	DF	(Saudi Arabia)	Sultan Al-Ghannam	1	0	1	0	2
9	19	MF	(Saudi Arabia)	Ali Al-Hassan	0	0	2	0	2
9	80	MF	(Brazil)	Wesley	2	0	0	0	2
12	1	GK	(Saudi Arabia)	Nawaf Al-Aqidi	1	0	0	0	1
12	5	DF	(Saudi Arabia)	Abdulelah Al-Amri	1	0	0	0	1
12	23	MF	(Saudi Arabia)	Ayman Yahya	1	0	0	0	1
12	96	DF	(Saudi Arabia)	Saad Al-Nasser	0	0	1	0	1
Total					33	3	14	2	52

Last Updated: 30 January 2026

=== Clean sheets ===
Rank	No.	Pos.	Nat.	Player	Pro League	King's Cup	ACL Two	Super Cup	Total
1	24	GK	(Brazil)	Bento	3	1	3	0	7
2	1	GK	(Saudi Arabia)	Nawaf Al-Aqidi	3	0	0	0	3
3	36	GK	(Saudi Arabia)	Raghed Al-Najjar	1	0	1	0	2
Total					7	1	4	0	12

Last Updated: 30 January 2026
