= Gio Garbelini =

Brazilian footballer (born 2003)

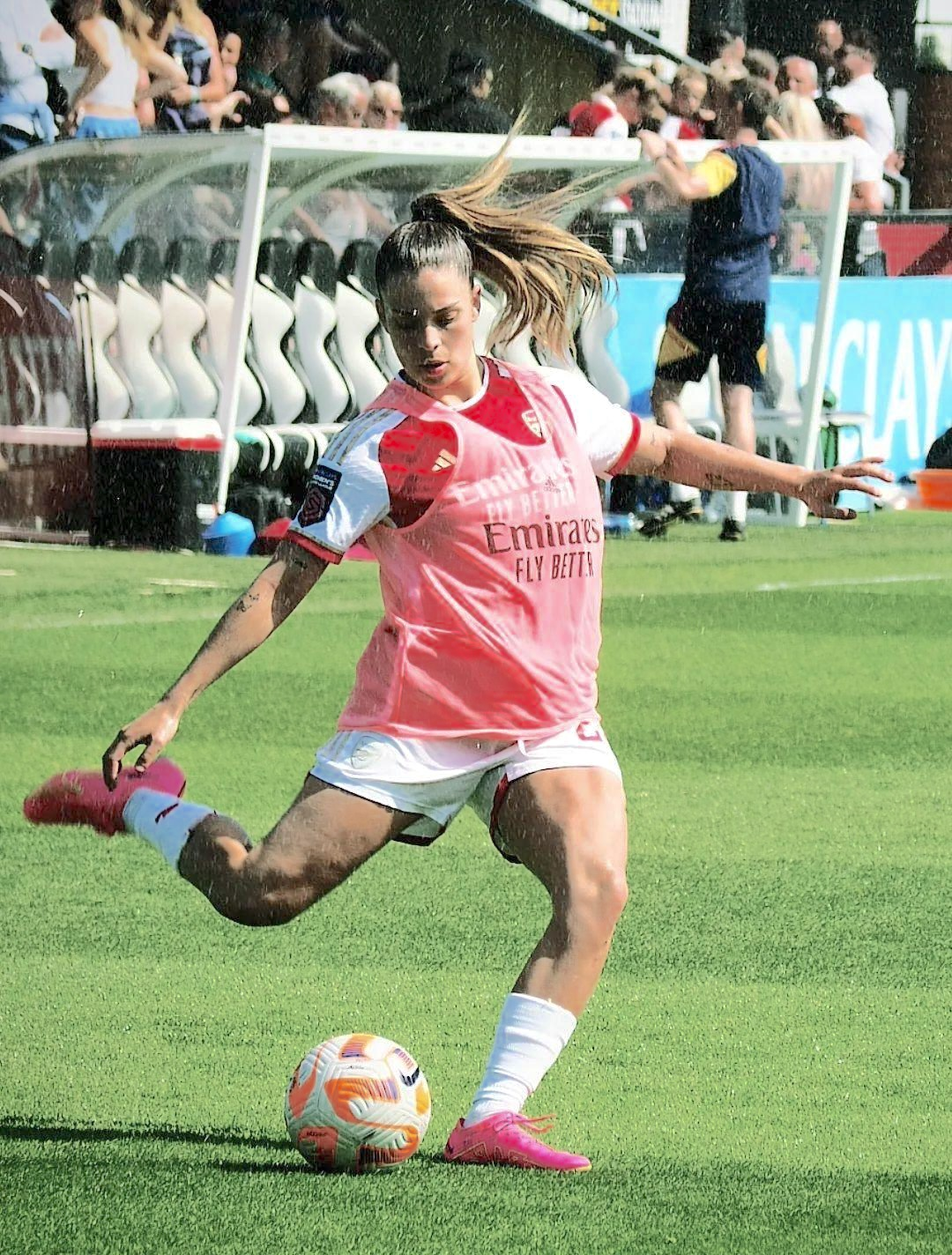
- Queiroz with Arsenal in 2023

Personal information
- Full name: Giovana Queiroz Costa Garbelini
- Date of birth: 21 June 2003 (age 23)
- Place of birth: São Paulo, Brazil
- Height: 1.67 m (5 ft 6 in)
- Position: Winger

Team information
- Current team: Atlético Madrid
- Number: 18

Youth career
- 2014–2017: Atlético Madrid
- 2017–2018: Madrid CFF

Senior career*
Years	Team	Apps	(Gls)
2018–2020	Madrid CFF B	15	(14)
2018–2020	Madrid CFF	14	(0)
2020–2021	Barcelona B	13	(9)
2020–2022	Barcelona	0	(0)
2021–2022	→ Levante (loan)	26	(7)
2022–2024	Arsenal	11	(0)
2022–2023	→ Everton (loan)	7	(1)
2024	→ Madrid CFF (loan)	16	(9)
2024–	Atlético Madrid	41	(8)

International career^{‡}
2019	United States U17	3	(0)
2019	Spain U17	3	(7)
2020	Brazil U17	2	(1)
2020–	Brazil	17	(4)
Medal record
Women's football
Representing Brazil
Copa América Femenina
Winner	2022 Colombia
Winner	2025 Ecuador
- * Club domestic league appearances and goals as of 03:18, 22 June 2026 (UTC) ‡ National team caps and goals as of 30 July 2022

Giovana Queiroz Costa Garbelini (born 21 June 2003), known as Gio Queiroz or simply Gio, (Note: Queiroz has and does use a variety of professional names, including sometimes Giovana Costa and Gio Garbelini.) is a Brazilian professional footballer who plays as a winger for Liga F club Atlético Madrid, and the Brazil women's national team.

== Early life ==
Queiroz was born in 2003 in São Paulo, Brazil. In 2007, her family moved to Weston, Florida and settled until 2014 when they moved to Madrid, Spain. She was part of the Atlético Madrid academy until 2017.

== Club career ==
Queiroz played in the youth teams of Atlético Madrid. She started her senior career in 2018 at Primera División club Madrid CFF. On 9 December 2018, she made her professional debut as a 15-year-old in a 0–7 defeat against Barcelona. Queiroz played 14 matches and scored one goal with Madrid until February 2020.

On 17 July 2020, Barcelona announced the signing of Queiroz for an undisclosed fee on a three-year deal. On 12 August 2021, Levante signed Gio on a one–year loan deal until the end of the 2021–22 season. She made her official debut for Levante in qualification for the 2021–22 UEFA Women's Champions League, entering the match against Celtic as a substitute. She scored her first goals for the club in the final of qualifying Round 1 against Rosenborg. She entered the match as a substitute and scored twice in extra time, including the match-winning goal that helped Levante advance to Round 2 of qualifying.

In 2022, Queiroz won the Samba Gold Feminino 2021 after defeating 29 opponents. The medal honours the best Brazilian player working abroad and was given to the women's category for the first time.

In September 2022, Queiroz was sold to Arsenal for around €40,000, with the club immediately sending her on loan to Everton for the season. Amid injuries at Arsenal, however, Queiroz was recalled the following January, after only seven matches for Everton, in which she had scored one goal against Tottenham. During her time at Arsenal, Queiroz was played mostly as a substitute by manager Jonas Eidevall. They had intended to send her on another loan for the 2023–24 season, but failed to come to an agreement before the season, also meaning they were unable to register her at the club. She was then loaned back to her first senior club, Madrid CFF, in January 2024.

During her spell at Madrid CFF, Queiroz received more opportunities and made an instant impact, scoring a hat trick against Villarreal CF, on 20th fixture of La Liga, a brace against Valencia CF, on 27th fixture, and another brace against Real Sociedad, on 29th fixture. In total, Queiroz scored 9 goals in 16 matches for Madrid CFF at 2023–24 Liga F.

On 2 August 2024, it was announced that Queiroz had completed a transfer back to Atlético Madrid. During the 2024–25 pre-season friendly against Ajax, Queiroz scored a hat-trick. Her good form at the start of the season was confirmed by scoring a debut goal in the first fixture of 2024-25 Liga F against Granada.

== International career ==
=== Youth ===
==== United States ====
Queiroz was called twice to represent the United States U17 national team in May and June 2019, playing at the UEFA Development Tournament held in May 2019 in Czech Republic. She started all three matches the team played at the tournament, which concluded with three wins for the United States U17 and the tournament title. In June, Queiroz was called again to a training camp held at the Elite Athlete Training Center in Chula Vista, California.

==== Spain ====
In August 2019, Queiroz was called to represent the Spain U17 national team in a friendly tournament held in Sweden in September of the same year. There, she played against the United States, whom she had played for months earlier, scoring a hat-trick and leading Spain to a 4–3 win.

==== Brazil ====
In February 2020, Queiroz was named to Brazil's under-17 squad. She played against Austria and Portugal, scoring a goal in a 2–0 win against the former.

=== Senior ===
On 8 October 2020, Queiroz was called by Brazil women's national football team's coach Pia Sundhage to a training camp in Portimão, Portugal on 18–28 October 2020. On 9 November, Queiroz was called to represent Brazil in two friendly matches against Argentina. Later, Argentina quit the matches with Ecuador taking its place. On 1 December, she debuted for Brazil coming in the half time of the 8–0 win over Ecuador. In June 2021, Queiroz was named to Brazil's squad for the 2020 Summer Olympics. She played against Zambia in the group stage match, coming up as substitute. Brazil ended up being eliminated at the penalties by Canada at the quarter-finals.

In June 2022, Queiroz was named to Brazil's squad for the 2022 Copa América Femenina. Brazil ended up winning the tournament for the 8th time, with Queiroz starting the initial match against Argentina and coming up as a substitute against Uruguay at the group stage. In July 2022, Queiroz was named to Brazil's squad for the 2022 FIFA U-20 Women's World Cup at Costa Rica, but she withdrew from the tournament.

In October 2024, Queiroz was called back to the national team, after a nearly two years absence, by new coach Arthur Elias, for two friendly matches against Colombia. Queiroz scored the second goal of the 3–1 victory. In November 2024, Queiroz was called up again for two friendly matches against Australia, scoring the third goal in a 3-1 victory against the home team.

== Personal life ==
Her brother, André Luiz Queiroz Costa, is also a footballer. He played for Real Madrid youth teams and represented the United States men's national under-17 soccer team at the 2018 Nike International Friendlies.

== Career statistics ==
Scores and results list Brazil's goal tally first, score column indicates score after each Garbelini goal.

List of international goals scored by Gio Garbelini
No.	Date	Venue	Opponent	Score	Result	Competition
1	26 November 2021	Arena da Amazônia, Manaus, Brazil	India	2–1	6–1	2021 International Women's Football Tournament of Manaus
2	1 December 2021	Arena da Amazônia, Manaus, Brazil	Chile	2–0	2–0	2021 International Women's Football Tournament of Manaus
3	29 October 2024	Estádio Kléber Andrade, Cariacica, Brazil	Colombia	2–0	3–1	Friendly
4	28 November 2024	Suncorp Stadium, Brisbane, Australia	Australia	3–1	3–1	Friendly
5	29 July 2025	Estadio Rodrigo Paz Delgado, Quito, Ecuador	Uruguay	2–0	5–1	2025 Copa América Femenina
6	13 October 2026	Arena Pernambuco, São Lourenço da Mata, Brazil	Argentina	2–0	2–0	Friendly

== Honours ==
Barcelona

- Primera División: 2020–21
- UEFA Women's Champions League: 2020–21

Brazil

- Copa América Femenina: 2022, 2025

Individual

- Samba Gold: 2021
- Liga F Player of the Month: March 2025
