= Wesley (footballer, born 2005) =

Brazilian footballer

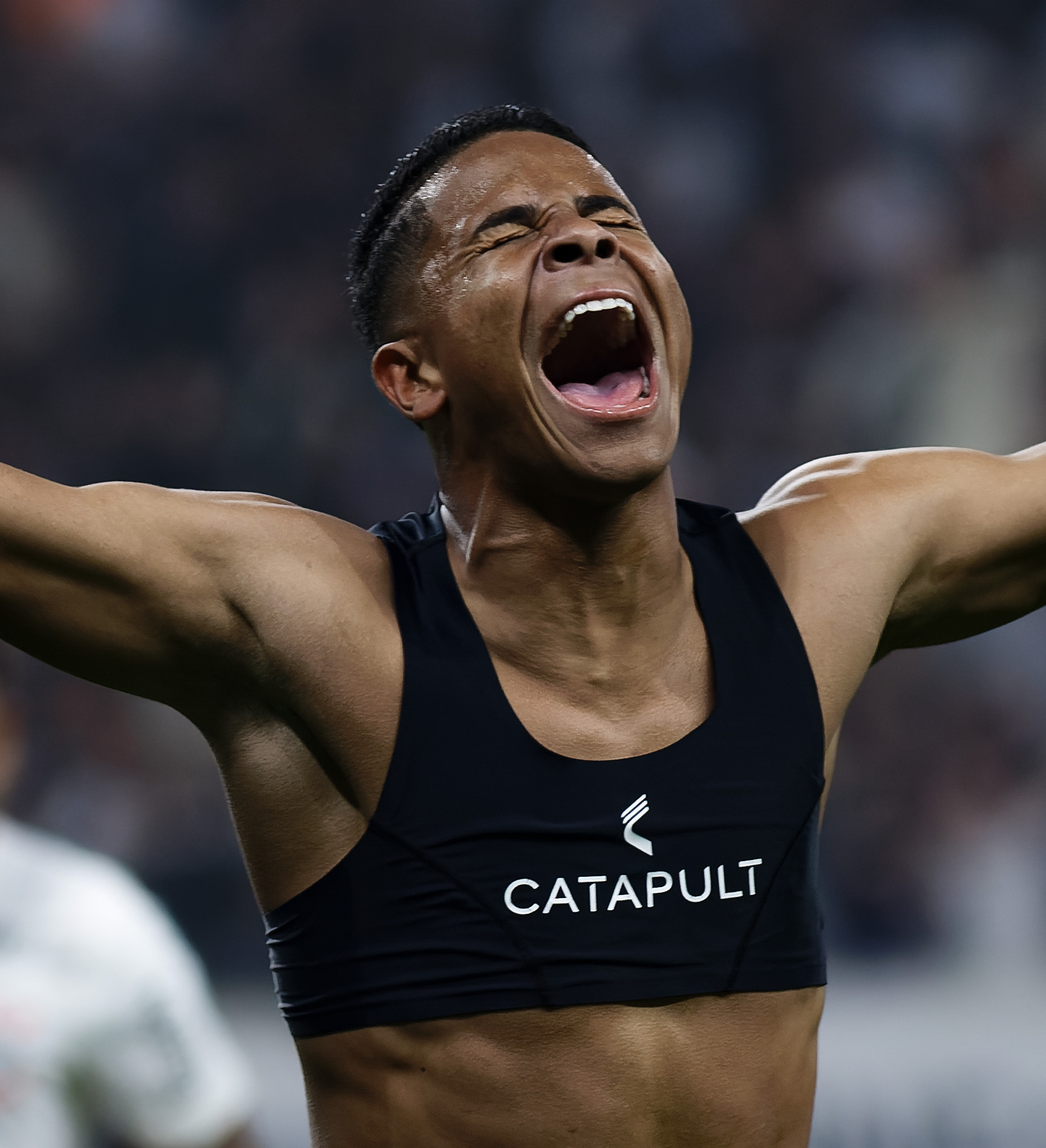
- Wesley celebrating a goal for Corinthians in 2023

Personal information
- Full name: Wesley Gassova Ribeiro Teixeira
- Date of birth: 5 March 2005 (age 21)
- Place of birth: São Paulo, Brazil
- Height: 1.80 m (5 ft 11 in)
- Position: Wide midfielder

Team information
- Current team: Cruzeiro (on loan from Al-Nassr)
- Number: 20

Youth career
- 2016–2022: Corinthians

Senior career*
| Years | Team | Apps | (Gls) |
| 2022–2024 | Corinthians | 61 | (4) |
| 2024– | Al-Nassr | 19 | (1) |
| 2026 | → Real Sociedad (loan) | 5 | (0) |
| 2026– | → Cruzeiro (loan) | 9 | (1) |

International career
| 2024 | Brazil U20 | 1 | (0) |
Medal record
Men's football
Representing Brazil
South American Youth Football Championship
| Winner | 2025 Venezuela |
- * Club domestic league appearances and goals as of 23 October 2026

Wesley Gassova Ribeiro Teixeira (born 5 March 2005), known as Wesley Gassova or just Wesley, is a Brazilian footballer who plays as a wide midfielder for Campeonato Brasileiro Série A club Cruzeiro, on loan from Saudi Pro League club Al-Nassr.

== Club career ==
=== Corinthians ===
Born in São Paulo, Wesley joined Corinthians' youth setup in 2016, for the under-11 squad. On 12 April 2022, he signed his first professional contract with the club, after agreeing to a three-year deal.

Wesley made his first team debut on 20 April 2022, coming on as a second-half substitute for Gustavo Silva in a 1–1 away draw against Portuguesa-RJ, for the year's Copa do Brasil. His Série A debut occurred on 7 June, as he again replaced Gustavo in a 1–0 away loss against Cuiabá.

Wesley scored his first professional goal on 1 August 2023, netting the winner in a 2–1 home success over Newell's Old Boys, for the year's Copa Sudamericana. The following 28 April, he scored a brace in a 3–0 home win over Fluminense.

=== Al-Nassr ===
On 30 August 2024, Wesley signed for Saudi Pro League club Al-Nassr on a four-year deal. Later that year, on 5 November, he scored his first goal for the club in the 2024–25 AFC Champions League Elite, scoring the fourth goal and providing an assist against the defending champions Al-Ain.

==== Loan to Real Sociedad ====
On 31 January 2026, Wesley signed for La Liga club Real Sociedad on loan from Saudi Pro League club Al-Nassr with an option to buy. The club mentioned in a statement that the clause was around €12 million.

==== Loan to Cruzeiro ====
He was loaned to Cruzeiro in August 2026, with a contract until June 2027 and an option to buy.

== Personal life ==
Wesley's father Wladimir was also a footballer, who played for lower league teams in Portugal and Belgium.

== Career statistics ==
As of match played 23 October 2026

| Club | Season | League | | | State league (Note: Includes Campeonato Paulista) | | National cup (Note: Includes Copa do Brasil, King's Cup) | | Continental | | Other | | Total | |
| Club | Season | Division | Apps | Goals | Apps | Goals | Apps | Goals | Apps | Goals | Apps | Goals | Apps | Goals |
|---|---|---|---|---|---|---|---|---|---|---|---|---|---|---|
| Corinthians | 2022 | Série A | 2 | 0 | — | | 2 | 0 | 0 | 0 | — | | 4 | 0 |
| Corinthians | 2023 | Série A | 24 | 1 | 1 | 0 | 2 | 0 | 7 (Note: Two appearances in Copa Libertadores, five appearances and one goal in Copa Sudamericana) | 1 | — | | 34 | 2 |
| Corinthians | 2024 | Série A | 23 | 2 | 11 | 1 | 5 | 1 | 7 (Note: Appearances in Copa Sudamericana) | 1 | — | | 46 | 5 |
| Corinthians | Total | | 49 | 3 | 12 | 1 | 9 | 1 | 14 | 2 | — | | 84 | 7 |
| Al-Nassr | 2024–25 | Saudi Pro League | 10 | 0 | — | | 2 | 0 | 10 (Note: Appearances in AFC Champions League Elite) | 1 | — | | 22 | 1 |
| Al-Nassr | 2025–26 | Saudi Pro League | 9 | 1 | — | | 2 | 1 | 5 (Note: Appearances in AFC Champions League Two) | 2 | 2 (Note: Appearances in Saudi Super Cup) | 0 | 18 | 4 |
| Al-Nassr | Total | | 19 | 1 | — | | 4 | 1 | 15 | 3 | 2 | 0 | 40 | 5 |
| Real Sociedad (loan) | 2025–26 | La Liga | 5 | 0 | — | | 0 | 0 | — | | — | | 5 | 0 |
| Cruzeiro (loan) | 2026 | Série A | 9 | 1 | — | | 2 | 0 | 2 (Note: Appearances in Copa Libertadores) | 0 | — | | 13 | 1 |
| Career total | | | 82 | 5 | 12 | 1 | 15 | 2 | 31 | 5 | 2 | 0 | 142 | 13 |

== Honours ==
Al-Nasser

- Saudi Pro League: 2025-26

Real Sociedad

- Copa del Rey: 2025–26

Brazil U20

- South American Youth Football Championship: 2025

Individual

- Samba Gold Best Brazilian U-20 player of the year: 2024.
