= Samba Gold =

Award

- Sport: Football
- Awarded for: Best Brazilian footballer
- Presented by: Sambafoot

History
- First award: 2008
- Editions: 17
- First winner: Kaká (2008)
- Most wins: Neymar (6 titles)
- Most recent: Vinícius Júnior (2nd title)
- Website: sambafoot.com

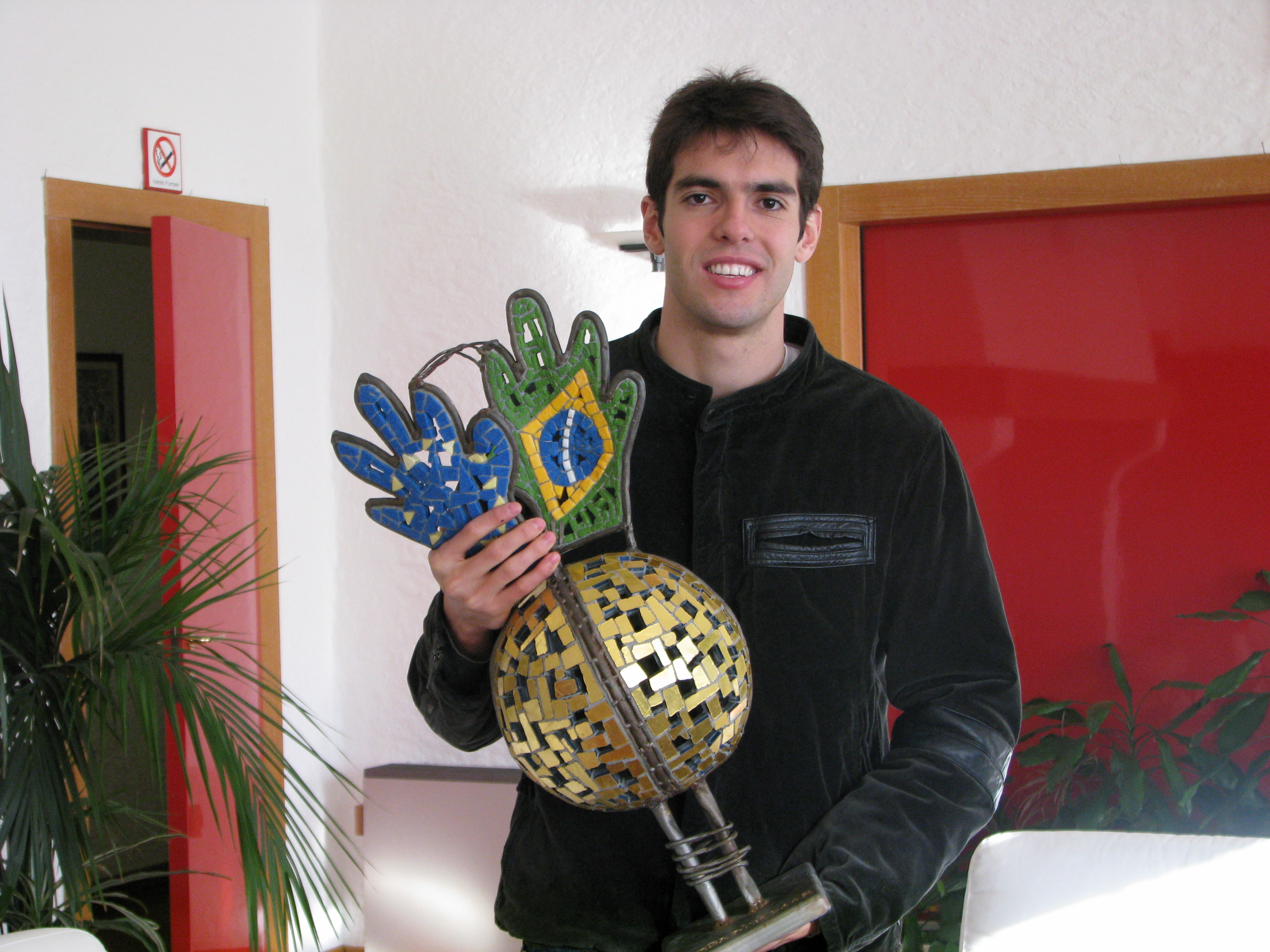
Kaká receiving the 2008 Samba Gold at Milanello

The Samba Gold (Portuguese: Samba de Ouro) is a football award given to the best Brazilian footballer in the world, as awarded by Sambafoot. The inaugural award was made in 2008. The award used to take into account the performance of Brazilian footballers in Europe only, but in 2021 was expanded to include players from all continents. The Samba Gold is determined by three voter panels: journalists, fellow footballers and votes from Sambafoot's online readers. In 2021, a women's award was added for the first time. An award for players aged 20 and under was added in 2022.

== History ==
- In 2008, the inaugural winner was Milan midfielder Kaká. Manchester City's Robinho and Sevilla's Luís Fabiano placed second and third in voting, respectively. There were thirty nominations, and voting took place from 1 to 30 December. Kaká obtained 25.03% of the vote, with 14.34% for Robinho and 13.65% for Fabiano.
- In 2009, Luís Fabiano (20.91%) of Sevilla won the trophy, ahead of Júlio César (17.58%) and Kaká (16.35%).
- In 2010, the prize was awarded to Maicon (12.60%) from Inter Milan, ahead of Hernanes (10.76%) and Thiago Silva (9.56%).
- In 2011, Milan defender Thiago Silva (16.33%) won the award, ahead of Dani Alves from Barcelona (15.56%) and Hulk from Porto (14.41%).
- In 2012, the list of thirty candidates was announced on 26 November. Paris Saint-Germain defender Thiago Silva (17.70%) was awarded the 2012 Samba Gold on 31 December, edging out Ramires (17.04%) and Willian (10.19%).
- In 2013, Thiago Silva won for a third consecutive year, beating out Dante in second and Oscar in third.
- In 2014, Neymar won the award for the first time, receiving a record percentage of votes (29.20%).
- In 2015, Neymar won the award for a second consecutive year, surpassing the record percentage of votes he received the year prior (37.87%).
- In 2016, Philippe Coutinho won the award for the first time, ending Neymar's two year reign.
- In 2017, Neymar won the award for the third time in four years.
- In 2018, Roberto Firmino won the award for the first time.
- In 2019, Alisson won the award for the first time, becoming the first goalkeeper to win the award.
- In 2020, Neymar won the award for a record fourth time.
- In 2021, Neymar won the award for a second consecutive and record-extending fifth time. Giovana Queiroz won the inaugural women's award.
- In 2022, Neymar won the award for a third consecutive and record-extending sixth time. Debinha won the women's award, while Endrick was voted winner of the inaugural under-20 award.
- In 2023, Vinícius Júnior won the award for the first time, ending Neymar's three year reign. Tamires won the women's award, while Marcos Leonardo won the under-20 award.
- In 2024, Vinícius Júnior won the award for a second consecutive time. Tamires also won the women's award for a second consecutive time, while Wesley won the under-20 award.

== Winners ==
=== Men's football ===
Year	First	Club(s)	Percent	Second	Club(s)	Percent	Third	Club(s)	Percent
2008	Kaká	(Italy) Milan	25.03%	Robinho	(Italy) Milan (England) Manchester City	14.34%	Luís Fabiano	(Spain) Sevilla	13.65%
2009	Luís Fabiano	(Spain) Sevilla	20.91%	Júlio César	(Italy) Internazionale	17.58%	Kaká	(Spain) Real Madrid	16.35%
2010	Maicon	(Italy) Internazionale	12.60%	Hernanes	(Brazil) São Paulo (Italy) Lazio	10.76%	Thiago Silva	(Italy) Milan	9.56%
2011	Thiago Silva	(Italy) Milan	16.33%	Dani Alves	(Spain) Barcelona	15.56%	Hulk	(Portugal) Porto	14.41%
2012	Thiago Silva	(Italy) Milan (France) Paris Saint-Germain	17.70%	Ramires	(England) Chelsea	17.04%	Willian	(Ukraine) Shakhtar Donetsk	10.19%
2013	Thiago Silva	(France) Paris Saint-Germain	24.19%	Dante	(Germany) Bayern Munich	14.63%	Oscar	(England) Chelsea	8.20%
2014	Neymar	(Spain) Barcelona	29.20%	Miranda	(Spain) Atlético Madrid	16.39%	Felipe Melo	(Turkey) Galatasaray	16.01%
2015	Neymar	(Spain) Barcelona	37.87%	Douglas Costa	(Ukraine) Shakhtar Donetsk (Germany) Bayern Munich	13.00%	Felipe Melo	(Turkey) Galatasaray (Italy) Internazionale	9.39%
2016	Philippe Coutinho	(England) Liverpool	32.13%	Neymar	(Spain) Barcelona	27.88%	Casemiro	(Spain) Real Madrid	13.35%
2017	Neymar	(Spain) Barcelona (France) Paris Saint-Germain	27.71%	Philippe Coutinho	(England) Liverpool	16.64%	Marcelo	(Spain) Real Madrid	14.43%
2018	Roberto Firmino	(England) Liverpool	21.79%	Marcelo	(Spain) Real Madrid	20.51%	Neymar	(France) Paris Saint-Germain	18.67%
2019	Alisson	(England) Liverpool	35.54%	Roberto Firmino	(England) Liverpool	23.48%	Thiago Silva	(France) Paris Saint-Germain	10.46%
2020	Neymar	(France) Paris Saint-Germain		Bruno Guimarães	(France) Lyon		Casemiro	(Spain) Real Madrid	
2021	Neymar	(France) Paris Saint-Germain	42.77%	Vinícius Júnior	(Spain) Real Madrid	14.45%	Lucas Veríssimo	(Portugal) Benfica	10.65%
2022	Neymar	(France) Paris Saint-Germain	40.46%	Lucas Paquetá	(France) Lyon (England) West Ham United	14.55%	Bruno Guimarães	(England) Newcastle United	13.31%
2023	Vinícius Júnior	(Spain) Real Madrid		Neymar	(France) Paris Saint-Germain		Marquinhos	(France) Paris Saint-Germain	
2024	Vinícius Júnior	(Spain) Real Madrid		Pedro	(Brazil) Flamengo		Rodrygo	(Spain) Real Madrid	

=== Women's football ===
Year	First	Club(s)	Percent	Second	Club(s)	Percent	Third	Club(s)	Percent
2021	Giovana Queiroz	(Spain) Levante	31.13%	Ludmila	(Spain) Atlético Madrid	14.45%	Gabi Nunes	(Spain) Madrid CFF	8.81%
2022	Debinha	(United States) North Carolina Courage	15.59%	Giovana Queiroz	(England) Arsenal	10.08%	Geyse	(Spain) Madrid CFF (Spain) Barcelona	
2023	Tamires	(Brazil) Corinthians		Bia Zaneratto	(Brazil) Palmeiras		Debinha	(United States) Kansas City Current	
2024	Tamires	(Brazil) Corinthians		Gabi Portilho	(Brazil) Corinthians		Ludmila	(United States) Chicago Stars FC	

=== Under-20 ===
Year	First	Club(s)	Percent	Second	Club(s)	Percent	Third	Club(s)	Percent
2022	Endrick	(Brazil) Palmeiras	28.39%	Matheus França	(Brazil) Flamengo	10.75%	Vitor Roque	(Brazil) Athletico Paranaense	10.13%
2023	Marcos Leonardo	(Brazil) Santos		Vitor Roque	(Brazil) Athletico Paranaense		Endrick	(Brazil) Palmeiras	
2024	Wesley	(Saudi Arabia) Al-Nassr (Brazil) Corinthians		Lucas Beraldo	(France) Paris Saint-Germain		Endrick	(Spain) Real Madrid	
