= Kingsley Coman =

French footballer (born 1996)

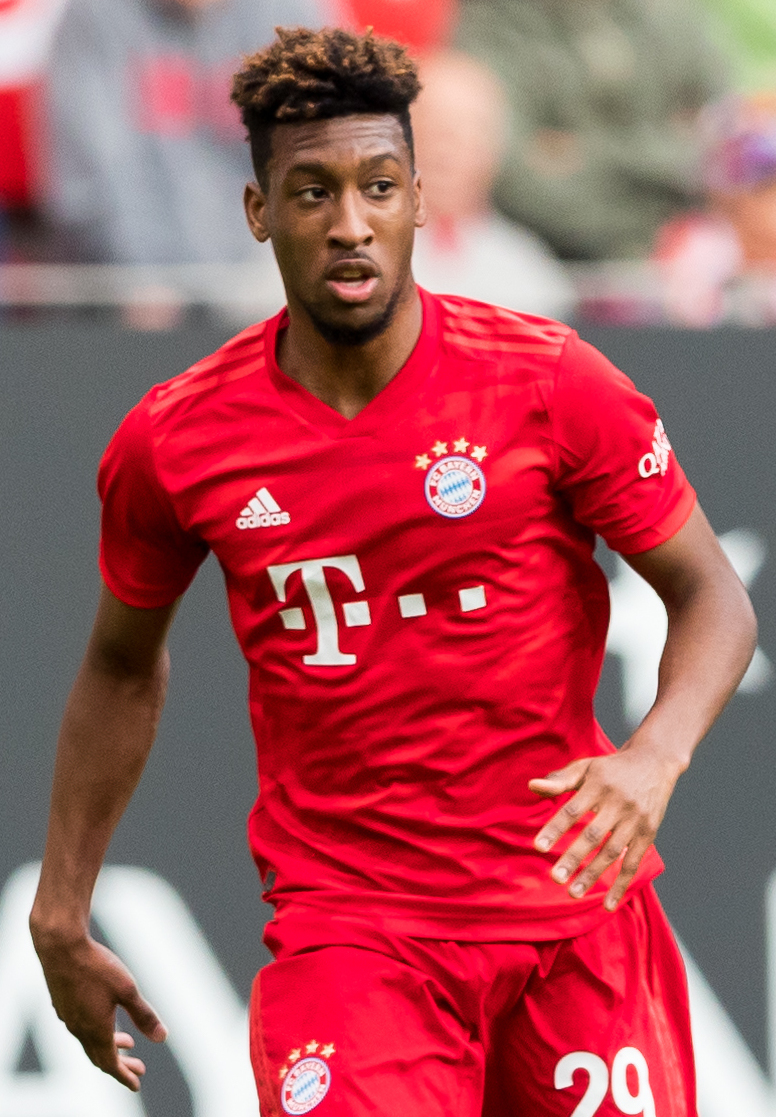
- Coman with Bayern Munich in 2019

Personal information
- Full name: Kingsley Junior Coman
- Date of birth: 13 June 1996 (age 30)
- Place of birth: Paris, France
- Height: 1.81 m (5 ft 11 in)
- Position: Winger

Team information
- Current team: Al-Nassr
- Number: 21

Youth career
- 2002–2004: Sénart-Moissy
- 2004–2013: Paris Saint-Germain

Senior career*
Years	Team	Apps	(Gls)
2013–2014	Paris Saint-Germain	3	(0)
2013–2014	Paris Saint-Germain II	16	(0)
2014–2017	Juventus	15	(0)
2015–2017	→ Bayern Munich (loan)	42	(6)
2017–2025	Bayern Munich	185	(40)
2025–	Al-Nassr	37	(11)

International career^{‡}
2011–2012	France U16	9	(0)
2012–2013	France U17	8	(3)
2013–2014	France U18	6	(1)
2013–2015	France U19	7	(2)
2014–2015	France U21	9	(2)
2015–2025	France	61	(8)
Medal record
Men's football
Representing France
FIFA World Cup
Runner-up	2022 Qatar
UEFA European Championship
Runner-up	2016 France
- * Club domestic league appearances and goals as of 20:47, 20 November 2026 (UTC) ‡ National team caps and goals as of 23:48, 13 October 2025 (UTC)

Kingsley Junior Coman (French pronunciation: [kiŋslɛ ʒy.njɔʁ kɔman, -mɑ̃]; born 13 June 1996) is a French professional footballer who plays as a winger for Saudi Pro League club Al-Nassr.

Trained at Paris Saint-Germain's academy, Coman moved to Juventus in 2014 on the expiration of his contract, winning the Serie A and Coppa Italia in his first season in Italy. In August 2015, he transferred on loan to Bayern Munich, then permanently, winning eight Bundesliga, three DFB-Pokal, and six DFL-Supercup titles. He won the 2019–20 UEFA Champions League by scoring the only goal in the final against Paris Saint-Germain, and won the UEFA Super Cup and FIFA Club World Cup later that year. He won the league title in his first 11 seasons as a professional, until the 2023–24 Bundesliga season, which was won by Bayer Leverkusen.

Coman earned 39 caps and scored 11 goals in France's youth teams, from under-16 to under-21 levels. He made his debut for the senior team in November 2015 and represented the nation at UEFA Euro 2016, where they reached the final, as well as Euro 2020, the 2022 FIFA World Cup (again making the final) and Euro 2024.

== Early life ==
Kingsley Junior Coman was born on 13 June 1996 in Paris, to parents from Guadeloupe.

== Club career ==
=== Early career ===
Coman began his career with US Sénart-Moissy in 2002, at the age of six.

=== Paris Saint-Germain ===
After two years with the club and the support of his father, Coman was scouted by Ligue 1 club Paris Saint-Germain (PSG), with whom he joined the youth academy in 2004. After nine years in the club's youth system, Coman made his professional debut for PSG on 17 February 2013 against Sochaux, a 3–2 defeat. He came on as a substitute for Marco Verratti in the 87th minute. At the time, Coman was the youngest player to play for PSG at the age of 16 years, eight months and four days.

On 3 August 2013, PSG won the Trophée des Champions, defeating Bordeaux 2–1 in Gabon. Coman played the final 16 minutes in place of Ezequiel Lavezzi.

=== Juventus ===
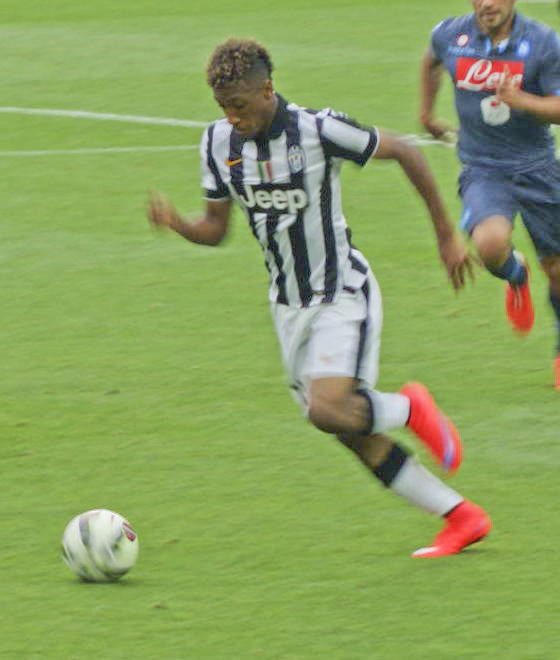
Coman playing for Juventus in 2015

On 7 July 2014, Coman signed a five-year deal with Italian champions Juventus following the expiration of his contract with PSG. On 30 August 2014, Coman made his Serie A debut, starting in a 1–0 away win against Chievo, twice nearly scoring.

On 15 January 2015, Coman scored his first professional goal in the last 16 of the Coppa Italia, against Hellas Verona in a 6–1 win. He was unused in the final on 20 May, a 2–1 extra-time win over Lazio. On 6 June, Coman appeared as a last-minute substitute for compatriot Patrice Evra in the 2015 UEFA Champions League Final as Juventus were defeated 3–1 by Barcelona at Berlin's Olympiastadion.

Coman started in the 2015 Supercoppa Italiana on 8 August at the Shanghai Stadium ahead of new signing Paulo Dybala, making way for him after an hour of the 2–0 win over Lazio. On 30 August 2015, Juventus approved a two-year loan deal for Coman to join German club Bayern Munich. According to Juventus manager Massimiliano Allegri, he had wanted to leave the club.

=== Bayern Munich ===
==== 2015–16 season ====
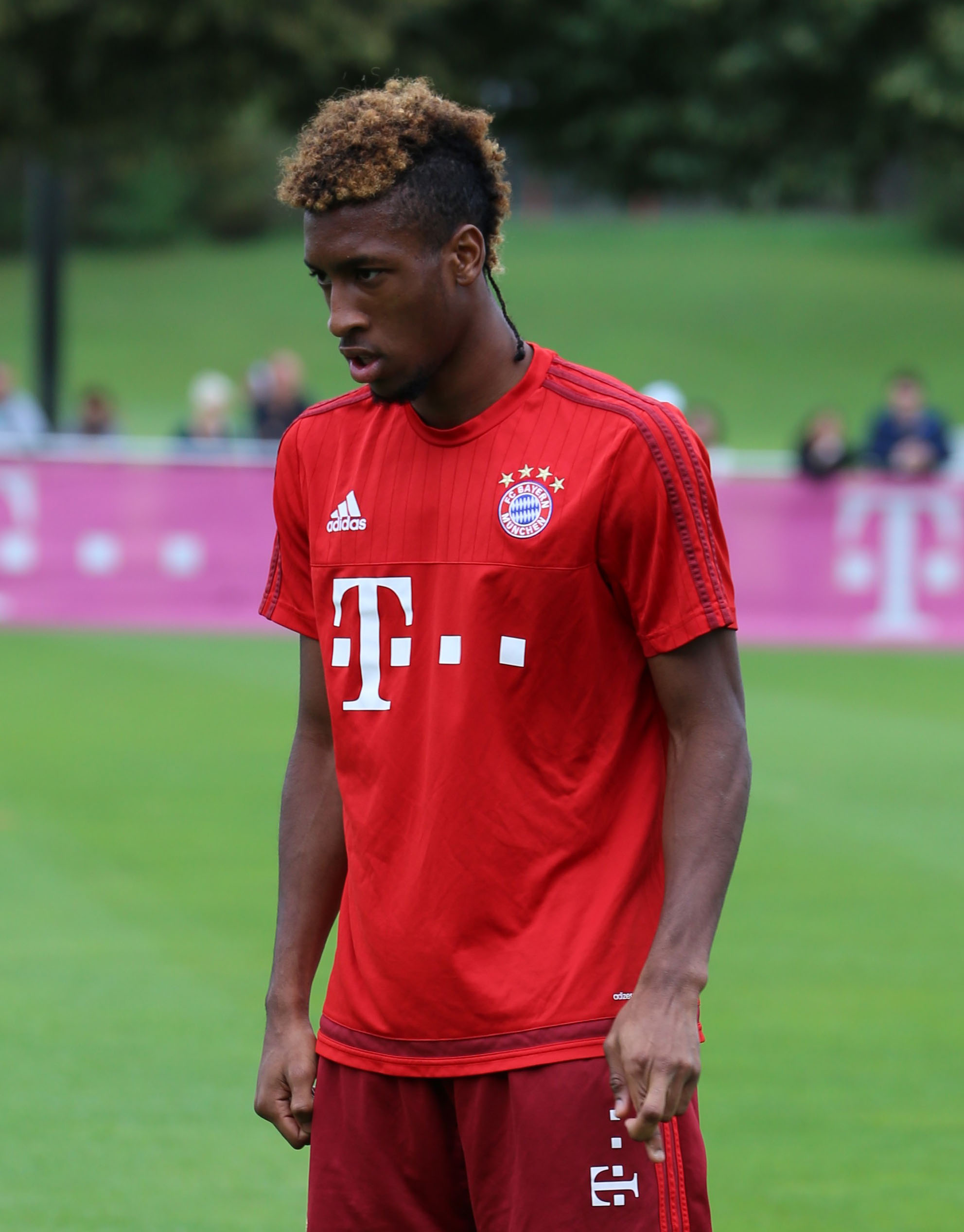
Coman training with Bayern Munich in 2015

On 30 August 2015, Coman signed with German side Bayern Munich on a two-year loan from Juventus for a fee of €7 million to be paid in two instalments with an option to buy for a fee of an extra €21 million upon 30 April 2017, two months before the loan's expiry. He was assigned the squad number 29.

Coman made his debut on 12 September, replacing Arturo Vidal after 56 minutes of an eventual 2–1 Bundesliga win over FC Augsburg at the Allianz Arena. A week later, on his first start, he scored his first goal for his new club, in a 3–0 victory at Darmstadt 98. The following week, he netted again in a win of the same margin at Mainz 05. On 24 November, Coman scored his first Champions League goal in a 4–0 defeat of Olympiacos. He was runner-up to compatriot Anthony Martial of Manchester United for the 2015 Golden Boy, awarded to Europe's best player under 21 years of age.

On 12 March 2016, Coman recorded three assists in a 5–0 victory over Werder Bremen. Four days later, he came on as a 60th-minute substitute for Xabi Alonso, with Bayern trailing 0–2 in the second leg of the Champions League round of 16, and assisted Thomas Müller's 91st-minute equaliser, before scoring the final goal in extra time as Bayern won 4–2 (6–4 aggregate) against his parent club, Juventus.

Coman was a 108th-minute substitute for Franck Ribéry in the 2016 DFB-Pokal Final, which Bayern won against Borussia Dortmund on penalties for a double. It was his eighth club trophy before his 20th birthday.

==== 2016–17 season ====
Coman made only 25 appearances in all competitions during the season. Coman had problems with injuries and couldn't force himself into the starting line-up like he did last season. Coman scored only two goals in his appearances. On 27 April 2017, it was announced that Bayern exercised their option to sign Coman, with the player signing a contract until 2020. During the season, Coman played a lesser role than under last season's manager, Pep Guardiola. At the end of the season, Coman said in an interview with France Football, "I was perhaps in a position that suited me a bit better [under Guardiola]. I had fewer injuries too. I played more on the wing, and the coach asked me to take people on. That's what I do best, it's the essence of my game. This season [under Ancelotti], it's a bit different, but a good player must be able to adapt to instructions and respect the choices of his coach." In an interview with the German magazine kicker on 29 May 2017, Coman said, "It was a complicated year for me. I thought about leaving Bayern."

==== 2017–18 season ====
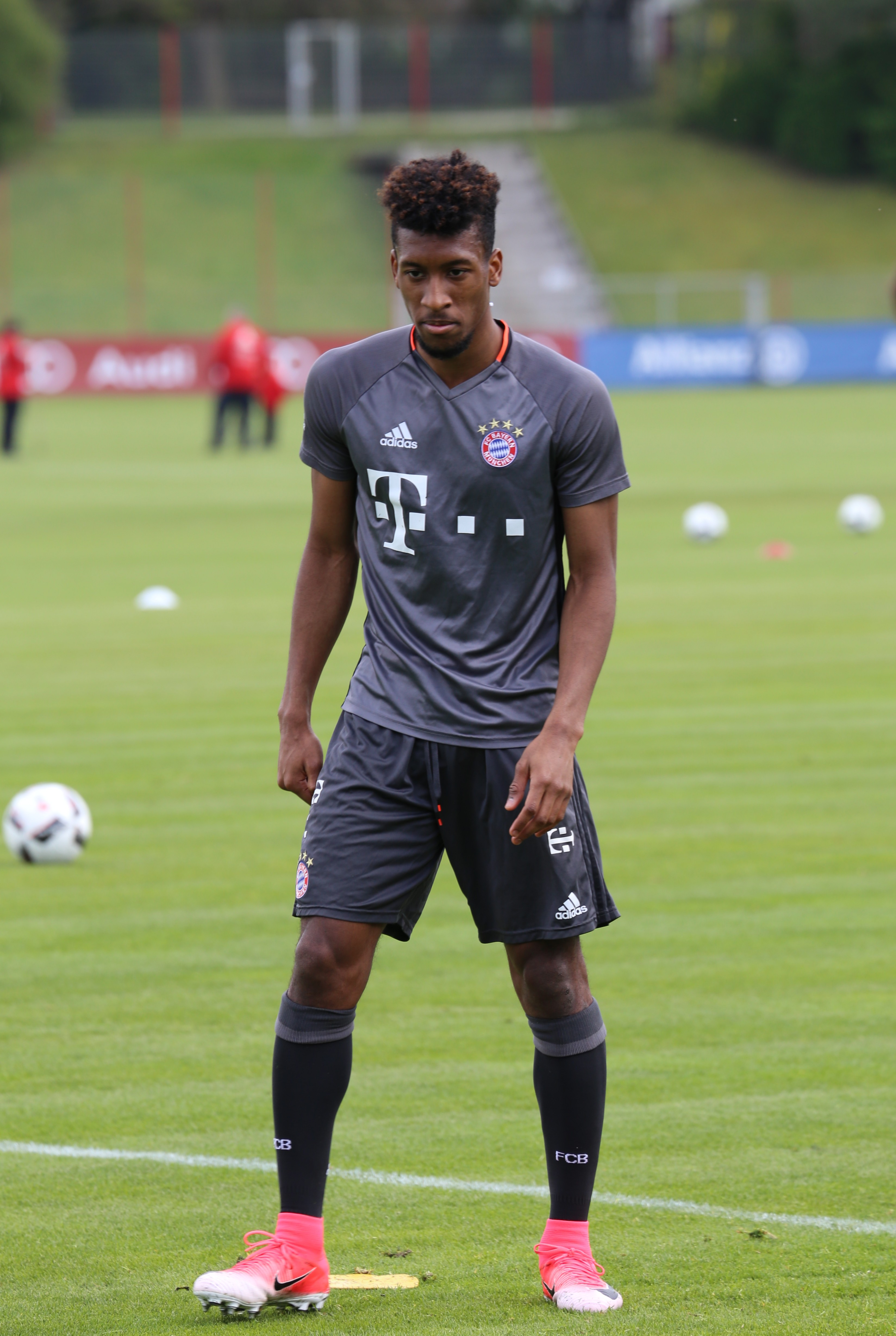
Coman training with Bayern Munich in 2017

The 2017–18 season was an excellent one for Coman. Coman had played 32 matches, scored seven goals and provided another eight assists throughout all competitions until late February, when Coman suffered an ankle injury against Hertha Berlin on 24 February 2018. Coman suffered a partial tear of ligaments in his left ankle. The injury required a surgery that was performed several days later.

On 19 May 2018, Coman returned from the ankle injury in the DFB-Pokal Final in Berlin in a loss against Eintracht Frankfurt. Coman came on as a substitute in the 70th minute.

On 21 December 2017, Coman signed a contract extension at Bayern until 30 June 2023.

==== 2018–19 season ====
On 12 August 2018, Coman played the first competitive fixture of the season after coming on as a substitute and scored a goal in a 5–0 victory over Eintracht Frankfurt as his team won the 2018 DFL-Supercup. Twelve days later, in the first game of the Bundesliga season, he sustained a syndesmosis ligament tear above his left ankle in a match against 1899 Hoffenheim. This injury was similar to the injury Coman sustained the previous season when he was out for almost three months. Coman returned from injury on 1 December 2018 when he came on as a substitute against Werder Bremen in a 2–1 win. Two weeks later, he made his 100th appearance for Bayern in a 4–0 away win at Hannover.

On 14 April 2019, Coman scored two goals in a 4–1 win at Düsseldorf, his third Bundesliga brace for Bayern. On 18 May 2019, Coman won his fourth consecutive Bundesliga title and his seventh consecutive league title. A week later, he won his second DFB-Pokal as Bayern defeated RB Leipzig 3–0 in the 2019 DFB-Pokal Final, with him scoring the second goal.

==== 2019–20 season ====
In the final of the 2019–20 UEFA Champions League on 23 August 2020, Coman headed in the only goal of the game as Bayern secured their sixth Champions League title with a win over former club PSG. In doing so, Coman became the first player in the history of the competition to score against a former club in the final.

==== 2020–2025 ====
On 21 October 2020, Coman scored a brace and provided one assist in a 4–0 win against Atlético Madrid in the first match of the 2020–21 UEFA Champions League. Coman won his 10th league title of his professional career on 8 May 2021 after closest challengers RB Leipzig failed to win their match against Borussia Dortmund. Before the 2021–22 season, Coman was assigned the number 11 shirt left vacant after the departure of Douglas Costa. Entering this season, Kingsley Coman hired agent Pini Zahavi, who also represented former teammates David Alaba and Robert Lewandowski to secure a transfer to another club. After Zahavi was unable to do so, Coman fired him harshly and re-signed his contract with FC Bayern Munich on 12 January 2022 until 2027. On 21 August 2022, Coman scored his first goal of the season in a 7–0 win over VfL Bochum. On 14 February 2023, he scored the only goal in a 1–0 away victory over his former club Paris Saint-Germain in the round of 16.

On 12 December 2023, Coman scored the only goal in a 1–0 away victory over Manchester United, to be his club's first away win against the latter at Old Trafford. Until Bayer Leverkusen won the Bundesliga in the 2023–24 season, Coman had won a league title in every season of his professional career: two with PSG, two with Juventus and eight with Bayern.

=== Al-Nassr ===
On 15 August 2025, Coman officially signed a three-year contract with Saudi Pro League side Al-Nassr worth €30 million, with €5 million in add-ons. Later that month, on 29 August, he scored his first goal in a 5–0 away win over Al Taawoun.

== International career ==
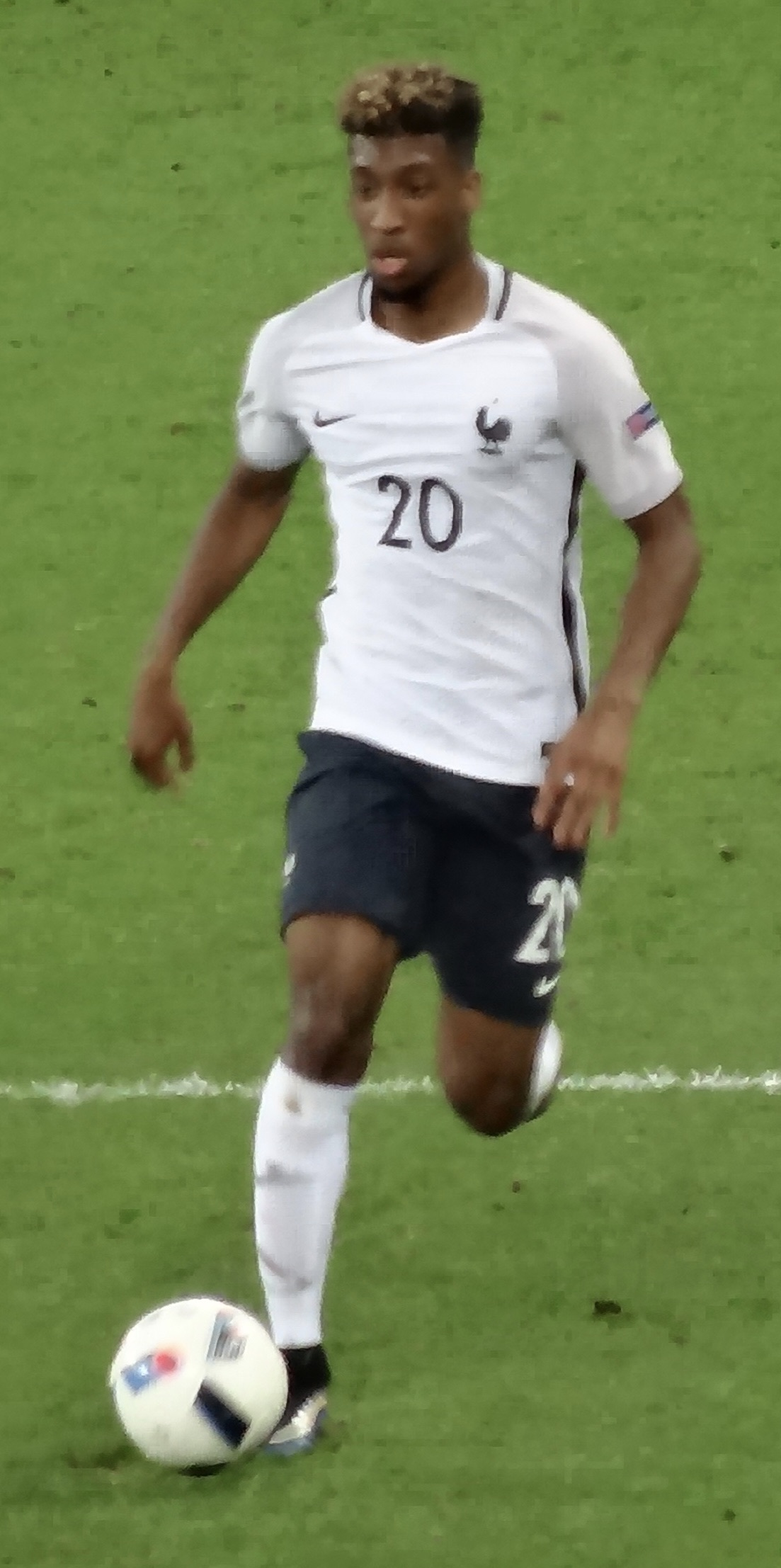
Coman playing for France at UEFA Euro 2016

On 2 June 2014, aged just 17, Coman made his first appearance for the France under-21 team, starting in a 6–0 friendly victory against Singapore and scoring once in the match.

On 5 November 2015, Coman was selected to the France senior squad for the first time to face Germany and England in friendlies. He made his debut eight days later at the Stade de France, coming on as a 69th-minute substitute for Anthony Martial in a 2–0 win over world champions Germany, overshadowed by shootings and explosions around the stadium. The following 29 March against Russia, in the first game at the venue since the attacks, Coman replaced Martial at half time and scored his first international goal when set up by Dimitri Payet, confirming a 4–2 win.

In May 2016, Coman was named to national team manager Didier Deschamps' 23-man France squad for UEFA Euro 2016, to be played on home soil. Following his performances throughout the tournament, as his nation reached the final, only to lose 1–0 to Portugal in extra-time, Coman was nominated for the Young Player of the Tournament Award, which ultimately went to Portugal's Renato Sanches. Coman was one of eleven players that were put on standby for France's squad at the 2018 FIFA World Cup in Russia. Coman was not called up for the 2018 World Cup, which was ultimately won by France, due to injury.

On 2 June 2019, Coman made his comeback for France against Bolivia after 19 months of not playing for the national team. Coman came on as a substitute in the 65th minute.

In June 2021, Coman was included in the final 26-man squad for the postponed UEFA Euro 2020. On 9 November 2022, he was included in the final squad for the 2022 FIFA World Cup in Qatar. On 18 December 2022, he came on as a substitute for Antoine Griezmann in the 2022 FIFA World Cup final against Argentina, the match finished 3–3 and went to a penalty shoot-out. Coman took France's second penalty in the shoot-out which was saved by goalkeeper Emiliano Martínez, with Argentina going on to win 4–2 on penalties.

== Style of play ==
Coman is a quick, talented and technically gifted winger, with good dribbling skills, vision, and explosive speed and acceleration. He is capable of playing on either flank, or even in the centre, as an offensive midfielder or as a striker. Although he is naturally right-footed, his preferred position is on the left, which allows him to beat opponents in one on one situations, cut into the centre onto his right foot, and either shoot on goal, create chances for teammates, or make attacking runs into the area. In 2015, Don Balón named him one of the 101 best young players in the world.

Under Julian Nagelsmann at Bayern and Didier Deschamps in the France senior national team, Coman has occasionally played as an attacking right wing-back.

== Personal life ==
In June 2017, Coman was arrested for domestic violence after physically assaulting model Sephora Goignan, his ex-girlfriend and mother of his first child. Coman reportedly admitted to the charges on Instagram. In September 2017 Coman pleaded guilty in a French court and agreed to pay €5,000 to Goignan. In June 2021, he had his third child with his Swedish girlfriend Sabrina, with whom he owns an apartment in Stockholm. During UEFA Euro 2024 he left the camp of the France national team to attend the birth of his fourth child.

Coman is a supporter of English football club Bolton Wanderers, due to his childhood admiration of Jay Jay Okocha.

== Career statistics ==
=== Club ===
As of match played 12 October 2026

Appearances and goals by club, season and competition
Club	Season	League			National cup (Note: Includes Coppa Italia, DFB-Pokal, King's Cup)		Continental		Other		Total	
Club	Season	Division	Apps	Goals	Apps	Goals	Apps	Goals	Apps	Goals	Apps	Goals
Paris Saint-Germain	2012–13	Ligue 1	1	0	0	0	0	0	—		1	0
Paris Saint-Germain	2013–14	Ligue 1	2	0	0	0	0	0	1 (Note: Appearance in Trophée des Champions)	0	3	0
Paris Saint-Germain	Total		3	0	0	0	0	0	1	0	4	0
Paris Saint-Germain II	2013–14	CFA	16	0	—		—		—		16	0
Juventus	2014–15	Serie A	14	0	4	1	2 (Note: Appearances in UEFA Champions League)	0	—		20	1
Juventus	2015–16	Serie A	1	0	0	0	0	0	1 (Note: Appearance in Supercoppa Italiana)	0	2	0
Juventus	Total		15	0	4	1	2	0	1	0	22	1
Bayern Munich (loan)	2015–16	Bundesliga	23	4	4	0	8	2	0	0	35	6
Bayern Munich (loan)	2016–17	Bundesliga	19	2	3	0	2	0	1 (Note: Appearance in DFL-Supercup)	0	25	2
Bayern Munich (loan)	Total		42	6	7	0	10	2	1	0	60	8
Bayern Munich	2017–18	Bundesliga	21	3	6	3	5	1	1	0	33	7
Bayern Munich	2018–19	Bundesliga	21	6	5	2	3	1	1	1	30	10
Bayern Munich	2019–20	Bundesliga	24	4	4	1	9	3	1	0	38	8
Bayern Munich	2020–21	Bundesliga	29	5	0	0	7	3	3 (Note: One appearance in DFL-Supercup, two appearances in FIFA Club World Cup)	0	39	8
Bayern Munich	2021–22	Bundesliga	21	6	1	0	9	2	1	0	32	8
Bayern Munich	2022–23	Bundesliga	24	8	3	0	7	1	1	0	35	9
Bayern Munich	2023–24	Bundesliga	17	3	2	0	7	2	1	0	27	5
Bayern Munich	2024–25	Bundesliga	28	5	2	1	11	1	4 (Note: Appearances in FIFA Club World Cup)	2	45	9
Bayern Munich	Total		185	40	23	7	58	14	13	3	279	64
Al-Nassr	2025–26	Saudi Pro League	30	10	2	0	7 (Note: Appearances in AFC Champions League Two)	6	2 (Note: Appearances in Saudi Super Cup)	0	41	16
Al-Nassr	2026–27	Saudi Pro League	6	1	1	0	1 (Note: Appearance in AFC Champions League Elite)	0	0	0	8	1
Al-Nassr	Total		36	11	3	0	8	6	2	0	49	17
Career total			297	57	37	8	78	22	18	3	430	90

=== International ===
As of match played 13 October 2025

Appearances and goals by national team and year
National team	Year	Apps	Goals
France	2015	2	0
France	2016	9	1
France	2017	4	0
France	2018	0	0
France	2019	7	3
France	2020	4	1
France	2021	10	0
France	2022	10	0
France	2023	9	3
France	2024	3	0
France	2025	3	0
Total		61	8

As of match played 13 October 2025
Scores and results list France's goal tally first.

List of international goals scored by Kingsley Coman
No.	Date	Venue	Opponent	Score	Result	Competition
1	29 March 2016	Stade de France, Saint-Denis, France	Russia	4–2	4–2	Friendly
2	7 September 2019	Stade de France, Saint-Denis, France	Albania	1–0	4–1	UEFA Euro 2020 qualifying
3	7 September 2019	Stade de France, Saint-Denis, France	Albania	3–0	4–1	UEFA Euro 2020 qualifying
4	10 September 2019	Stade de France, Saint-Denis, France	Andorra	1–0	3–0	UEFA Euro 2020 qualifying
5	17 November 2020	Stade de France, Saint-Denis, France	Sweden	4–2	4–2	2020–21 UEFA Nations League A
6	17 October 2023	Stade Pierre-Mauroy, Lille, France	Scotland	4–1	4–1	Friendly
7	18 November 2023	Allianz Riviera, Nice, France	Gibraltar	6–0	14–0	UEFA Euro 2024 qualifying
8	18 November 2023	Allianz Riviera, Nice, France	Gibraltar	9–0	14–0	UEFA Euro 2024 qualifying

== Honours ==
Paris Saint-Germain

- Ligue 1: 2012–13, 2013–14
- Trophée des Champions: 2013

Juventus

- Serie A: 2014–15 2015–16
- Coppa Italia: 2014–15
- Supercoppa Italiana: 2015
- UEFA Champions League runner-up: 2014–15

Bayern Munich

- Bundesliga: 2015–16, 2016–17, 2017–18, 2018–19, 2019–20, 2020–21, 2021–22, 2022–23, 2024–25
- DFB-Pokal: 2015–16, 2018–19, 2019–20; runner-up: 2017–18
- DFL-Supercup: 2016, 2017, 2018, 2020, 2021, 2022
- UEFA Champions League: 2019–20
- FIFA Club World Cup: 2020

Al-Nassr

- Saudi Pro League: 2025–26
- AFC Champions League Two runner-up: 2025–26

France

- FIFA World Cup runner-up: 2022
- UEFA European Championship runner-up: 2016

Individual

- kicker Bundesliga Team of the Season: 2018–19
- Titi d'Or: 2012, 2013
- Bundesliga Goal of the Month: October 2024
