= Aboubacar Cissé =

Ivorian footballer

Personal information
- Full name: Aboubacar Cissé
- Date of birth: July 28, 1969 (age 57)
- Place of birth: Abidjan, Côte d'Ivoire
- Height: 1.82 m (5 ft 11 1/2 in)
- Position: Midfielder

Senior career*
Years	Team	Apps	(Gls)
1988–1989	Arles	?	(?)
1989–1990	Sète	29	(9)
1990–1992	Nîmes	23	(2)
1992–1994	Nice	27	(3)
1994–1995	Chamois Niortais	22	(1)
1995–1996	Nyons	?	(?)
1996–1997	Sète	23	(3)
1997–1998	Beaucaire	25	(3)
1998–1999	Gap	?	(?)
- * Club domestic league appearances and goals

Aboubacar Cissé (born July 28, 1969, in Abidjan, Côte d'Ivoire) is an Ivorian former professional footballer. He played as a midfielder.
