= 2025 Saudi Super Cup final =

2025 Saudi Super Cup Final
- Event: 2025 Saudi Super Cup
| Al-Nassr | Al-Ahli |
| 2 | 2 |
- Al-Ahli won 5–3 on penalties
- Date: 23 August 2025
- Venue: Hong Kong Stadium, Hong Kong
- Referee: Mohammed Al-Hoaish
- Attendance: 30,240
- Weather: Rainy; 27 °C (81 °F); 84% humidity

The 2025 Saudi Super Cup final was the 12th edition of the Saudi Super Cup. The final was played on 23 August 2025 at the Hong Kong Stadium, Hong Kong, between Al-Ahli and Al-Nassr.

Al-Ahli won 5–3 on a penalty shoot-out after a 2–2 draw, securing their second title and first since 2016.

== Teams ==
| Team | Qualification for tournament | Previous finals appearances (bold indicates winners) |
|---|---|---|
| Al-Nassr | 2024–25 Pro League third place | 5 (2014, 2015, **2019**, **2020**, 2024) |
| Al-Ahli | 2024–25 Pro League fifth place | 1 (**2016**) |

== Venue ==
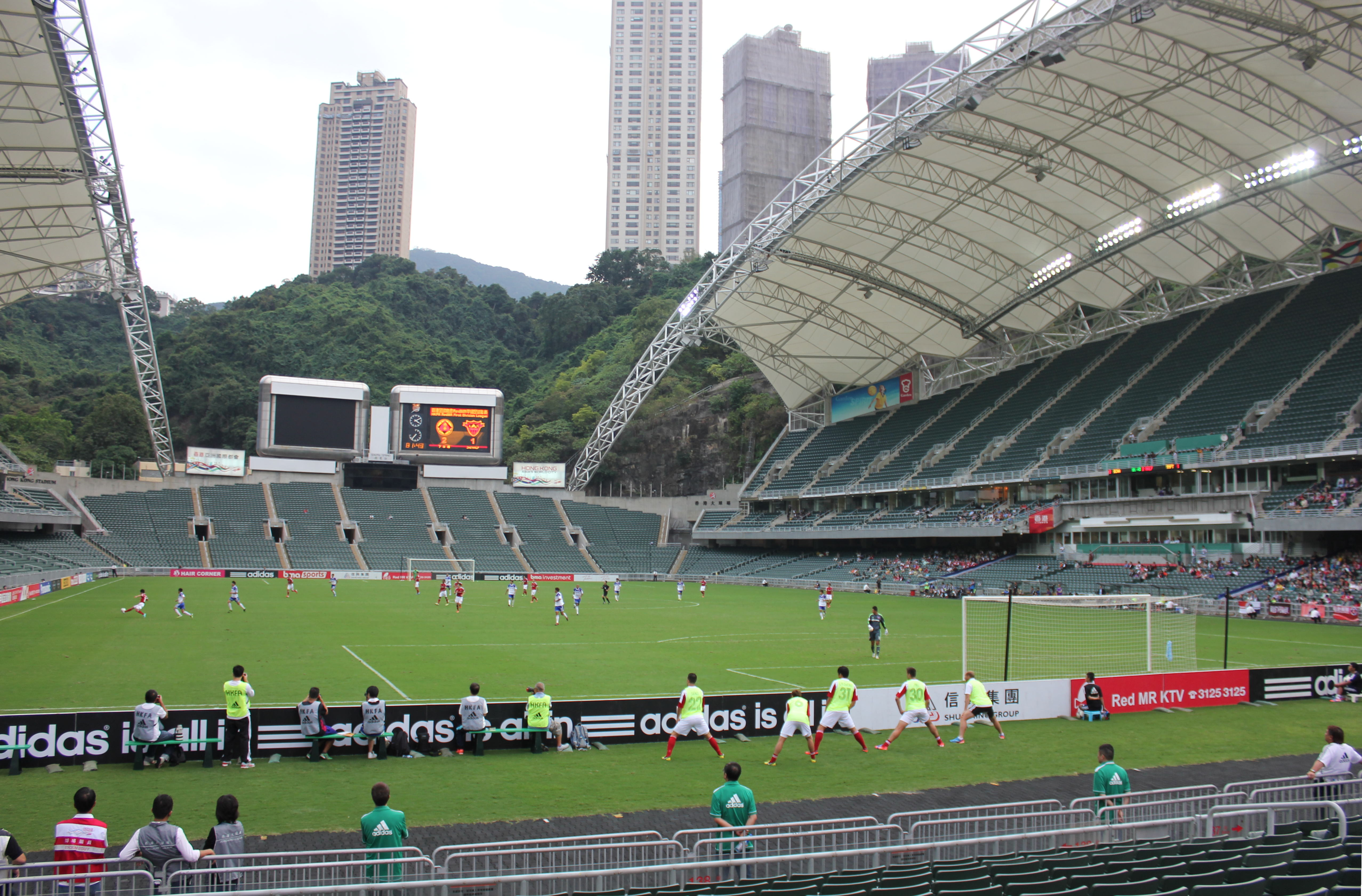
The Hong Kong Stadium in Hong Kong hosted the match

The Hong Kong Stadium was announced as the venue of the tournament on 13 June 2025. This was the first time the tournament was hosted in Hong Kong.

The Hong Kong Stadium was built and opened in 1953 as the Government Stadium and underwent renovations and reopened as the Hong Kong Stadium in 1994. The stadium was used as a venue for the inaugural AFC Asian Cup as well as the 1997–98 Asian Club Championship knockout stage. It is used by the Hong Kong national team as a home stadium.

== Background ==
This was Al-Ahli's second appearance in the final. Al-Ahli beat Al-Hilal on penalties in their only final appearance in 2016. Al-Ahli qualified by defeating Al-Qadsiah 5–1 in the semi-finals.

Al-Nassr were making their sixth finals appearance, the joint most by any club. They won the title twice, in 2019 and 2020. Al-Nassr qualified after defeating Al-Ittihad 2–1 in the semi-finals.

This was the first meeting between these two sides in the Saudi Super Cup and the eleventh meeting in a cup final. In the ten previous cup final meetings, Al-Ahli has won six times, while Al-Nassr has won four times. The first cup final between the two dates back to the 1971 King Cup final. This was the 139th competitive meeting between the two sides in all competitions. In their prior encounters, Al-Ahli won 53 times, Al-Nassr won 50 times, and the two teams drew 35 times. Majed Abdullah is the top scorer of this fixture with 24 goals. The two teams had met twice previously in the 2024–25 season, with the first fixture ending in a draw and Al-Nassr winning the return fixture.

Ahead of the final match, Al-Ahli striker Ivan Toney expressed frustration over his team's treatment during preparations in Hong Kong. He criticized the organizers for providing subpar training conditions, stating, "We've been on the worst pitch, and trained after other teams. We've been the most hated, the team nobody wants to win; it gives us that extra hunger and fight to win something against these teams".

== Match ==
=== Details ===
23 August 2025
20:00 HKT

| Al-Nassr | 2–2 | Al-Ahli |
|---|---|---|
| Ronaldo 41' (pen.); Brozović 82' | Report | Kessié 45+6'; Ibañez 89' |
Penalties
| Ronaldo (penalty scored); Brozović (penalty scored); Félix (penalty scored); Al-Khaibari (penalty missed) | 3–5 | (penalty scored) Toney; (penalty scored) Kessié; (penalty scored) Mahrez; (penalty scored) Al-Buraikan; (penalty scored) Galeno |

Hong Kong Stadium, Hong Kong
Attendance: 30,240
Referee: Mohammed Al-Hoaish

| **Al-Nassr** | **Al-Ahli** |

| GK | 24 | (Brazil) Bento |
| RB | 12 | (Saudi Arabia) Nawaf Boushal | (yellow card) 90+3' |
| CB | 3 | (France) Mohamed Simakan |
| CB | 26 | (Spain) Iñigo Martínez |
| LB | 23 | (Saudi Arabia) Ayman Yahya | | (substituted off) 86' |
| DM | 11 | (Croatia) Marcelo Brozović | (yellow card) 53' |
| DM | 17 | (Saudi Arabia) Abdullah Al-Khaibari |
| RW | 21 | (France) Kingsley Coman |
| AM | 79 | (Portugal) João Félix |
| LW | 80 | (Brazil) Wesley | (yellow card) 30' | (substituted off) 78' |
| CF | 7 | (Portugal) Cristiano Ronaldo |
Substitutes:
| GK | 1 | (Saudi Arabia) Nawaf Al-Aqidi |
| DF | 2 | (Saudi Arabia) Sultan Al-Ghannam | | (substituted on) 78' |
| DF | 5 | (Saudi Arabia) Abdulelah Al-Amri |
| DF | 70 | (Saudi Arabia) Awad Aman |
| DF | 83 | (Saudi Arabia) Salem Al-Najdi |
| MF | 19 | (Saudi Arabia) Ali Al-Hassan |
| MF | 29 | (Saudi Arabia) Abdulrahman Ghareeb |
| MF | 46 | (Saudi Arabia) Abdulaziz Al-Aliwa |
| FW | 16 | (Saudi Arabia) Mohammed Maran |
| FW | 20 | (Brazil) Ângelo Gabriel | | (substituted on) 86' |
| FW | 30 | (Saudi Arabia) Meshari Al-Nemer |
| FW | 60 | (Saudi Arabia) Saad Haqawi |
Manager:
(Portugal) Jorge Jesus

| GK | 16 | (Senegal) Édouard Mendy |
| RB | 27 | (Saudi Arabia) Ali Majrashi |
| CB | 28 | (Turkey) Merih Demiral | (yellow card) 51' |
| CB | 3 | (Brazil) Roger Ibañez |
| LB | 32 | (Belgium) Matteo Dams | (yellow card) 74' | (substituted off) 78' |
| RM | 7 | (Algeria) Riyad Mahrez |
| CM | 79 | (Ivory Coast) Franck Kessié | (yellow card) 39' |
| CM | 10 | (France) Enzo Millot |
| LM | 13 | (Brazil) Galeno |
| CF | 9 | (Saudi Arabia) Firas Al-Buraikan |
| CF | 17 | (England) Ivan Toney | (yellow card) 12' |
Substitutes:
| GK | 1 | (Saudi Arabia) Abdulrahman Al-Sanbi |
| GK | 62 | (Saudi Arabia) Abdullah Abdoh |
| DF | 5 | (Saudi Arabia) Mohammed Sulaiman |
| DF | 29 | (Saudi Arabia) Mohammed Abdulrahman |
| DF | 31 | (Saudi Arabia) Saad Balobaid | | (substituted on) 78' |
| DF | 46 | (Saudi Arabia) Rayan Hamed |
| DF | 88 | (Saudi Arabia) Abdulelah Al-Khaibari |
| MF | 14 | (Saudi Arabia) Eid Al-Muwallad |
| MF | 19 | (Saudi Arabia) Fahad Al-Rashidi |
| MF | 26 | (Saudi Arabia) Yaseen Al-Zubaidi |
| MF | 30 | (Saudi Arabia) Ziyad Al-Johani |
| MF | 47 | (Saudi Arabia) Saleh Aboulshamat |
Manager:
(Germany) Matthias Jaissle

Assistant referees:
Khalaf Al-Shammari
Yassir Al-Sultan
Fourth official:
Majed Al-Shamrani
Video assistant referee:
Mamdouh Al Shahdan
Assistant video assistant referees:
Abdulrahim Al-Shammari

**Match rules**

- 90 minutes
- Penalty shoot-out if scores still level
- Twelve named substitutes
- Maximum of five substitutions

=== Statistics ===
First half
| Statistic | Al-Nassr | Al-Ahli |
|---|---|---|
| Goals scored | 1 | 1 |
| Total shots | 7 | 2 |
| Shots on target | 3 | 1 |
| Saves | 0 | 2 |
| Ball possession | 63% | 37% |
| Corner kicks | 3 | 0 |
| Offsides | 0 | 3 |
| Yellow cards | 1 | 2 |
| Red cards | 0 | 0 |

Second half
| Statistic | Al-Nassr | Al-Ahli |
|---|---|---|
| Goals scored | 1 | 1 |
| Total shots | 5 | 6 |
| Shots on target | 2 | 1 |
| Saves | 0 | 1 |
| Ball possession | 61% | 39% |
| Corner kicks | 4 | 4 |
| Offsides | 0 | 1 |
| Yellow cards | 2 | 2 |
| Red cards | 0 | 0 |

Overall
| Statistic | Al-Nassr | Al-Ahli |
|---|---|---|
| Goals scored | 2 | 2 |
| Total shots | 12 | 8 |
| Shots on target | 5 | 2 |
| Saves | 0 | 3 |
| Ball possession | 62% | 38% |
| Corner kicks | 7 | 4 |
| Fouls committed | 9 | 13 |
| Offsides | 0 | 4 |
| Yellow cards | 3 | 4 |
| Red cards | 0 | 0 |

== See also ==
- 2024–25 Saudi Pro League
- 2024–25 King Cup
