= 2025–26 Al-Ahli Saudi FC season =

Al-Ahli
2025–26 season
- President: Khalid Al-Eissa
- Manager: Matthias Jaissle
- Stadium: King Abdullah Sports City
- Pro League: 3rd
- King's Cup: Semi-finals
- Super Cup: Winners
- ACL Elite: Winners
- FIFA Intercontinental Cup: African–Asian–Pacific Cup
- Top goalscorer: League: Ivan Toney (32); All: Ivan Toney (42)
Home colours	Away colours	Third colours

The 2025–26 season was Al-Ahli's 89th year in existence and 49th season in the Pro League. The club participated in the Pro League, the King's Cup, the AFC Champions League Elite, the FIFA Intercontinental Cup, and the Super Cup.

This season marked the second time the club reached the ACL Elite final, and they went on to win the competition for a second consecutive year.

The season covered the period from 1 July 2025 to 30 June 2026.

== Players ==
=== Squad information ===
As of 1 February 2025

Note: Flags indicate national team as defined under FIFA eligibility rules; some limited exceptions apply. Players may hold more than one non-FIFA nationality.

No.	Pos.	Nation	Player
1	GK	KSA	Abdulrahman Al-Sanbi
3	DF	BRA	Roger Ibañez
5	DF	KSA	Mohammed Sulaiman
6	DF	KSA	Bassam Al-Hurayji
7	FW	ALG	Riyad Mahrez
8	MF	KSA	Sumayhan Al-Nabit
9	FW	KSA	Firas Al-Buraikan
11	MF	BRA	Alexsander
13	MF	BRA	Galeno
14	MF	KSA	Eid Al-Muwallad
15	DF	KSA	Abdullah Al-Ammar
16	GK	SEN	Édouard Mendy
17	FW	ENG	Ivan Toney
18	MF	KSA	Younes Al-Shanqiti
19	MF	KSA	Fahad Al-Rashidi
21	GK	KSA	Emad Feda

No.	Pos.	Nation	Player
27	DF	KSA	Ali Majrashi
28	DF	TUR	Merih Demiral
29	MF	KSA	Mohammed Al-Majhad
30	MF	KSA	Ziyad Al-Johani
31	DF	KSA	Saad Balobaid
32	DF	BEL	Matteo Dams
39	MF	KSA	Yaseen Al-Zubaidi
46	DF	KSA	Rayan Hamed
47	MF	KSA	Ziyad Al-Ghamdi
49	MF	KSA	Firas Al-Ghamdi
62	GK	KSA	Abdullah Abdo
65	MF	KSA	Faisal Al-Sibyani
73	MF	KSA	Abdulrahman Al-Humayani
79	MF	CIV	Franck Kessie
95	MF	KSA	Ayman Fallatah

== Transfers and loans ==
=== Transfers in ===
Entry date	Position	No.	Player	From club	Fee	Ref.
30 June 2025	MF	18	(Saudi Arabia) Younes Al-Shanqeeti	(Saudi Arabia) Al-Shabab	End of loan	
30 June 2025	MF	39	(Saudi Arabia) Yaseen Al-Zubaidi	(Saudi Arabia) Al-Okhdood	End of loan	
30 June 2025	MF	49	(Saudi Arabia) Firas Al-Ghamdi	(Saudi Arabia) Al-Arabi	End of loan	
30 June 2025	MF	65	(Saudi Arabia) Faisal Al-Subiani	(Saudi Arabia) Damac	End of loan	
30 June 2025	MF	73	(Saudi Arabia) Abdulrahman Al-Humayani	(Saudi Arabia) Al-Anwar	End of loan	
30 June 2025	MF	95	(Saudi Arabia) Ayman Fallatah	(Saudi Arabia) Damac	End of loan	
30 June 2025	FW	94	(Brazil) Marcão	(Turkey) Kocaelispor	End of loan	
30 June 2025	FW	97	(France) Allan Saint-Maximin	(Turkey) Fenerbahçe	End of loan	
22 July 2025	DF	88	(Saudi Arabia) Abdulelah Al-Khaibari	(Saudi Arabia) Al-Riyadh	$3,465,000	
31 July 2025	DF	29	(Saudi Arabia) Mohammed Abdulrahman	(Saudi Arabia) Al-Ettifaq	$6,665,000	
1 August 2025	MF	47	(Saudi Arabia) Saleh Aboulshamat	(Saudi Arabia) Al-Khaleej	$2,400,000	
9 August 2025	MF	10	(France) Enzo Millot	(Germany) VfB Stuttgart	$32,600,000	
19 August 2025	GK	72	(Saudi Arabia) Salman Al-Jadani	(Saudi Arabia) Al-Washm	Free	
19 August 2025	DF	60	(Saudi Arabia) Yazan Madani	(Albania) Egnatia	Free	
1 September 2025	MF	20	(Brazil) Matheus Gonçalves	(Brazil) Flamengo	$10,500,000	
6 September 2025	MF	6	(France) Valentin Atangana	(France) Reims	$29,300,000	
4 January 2026	FW	77	(Brazil) Ricardo Mathias	(Brazil) Internacional	$11,800,000	

=== Loans in ===
Start date	End date	Position	No.	Player	From club	Fee	Ref.
1 September 2025	End of season	DF	2	(Saudi Arabia) Zakaria Hawsawi	(Saudi Arabia) Al-Raed	$3,200,000	

=== Transfers out ===
Exit date	Position	No.	Player	To club	Fee	Ref.
1 July 2025	DF	77	(North Macedonia) Ezgjan Alioski	(Switzerland) Lugano	Free	
1 July 2025	MF	24	(Spain) Gabri Veiga	(Portugal) Porto	$17,600,000	
1 July 2025	MF	45	(Saudi Arabia) Abdulkarim Darisi	(Saudi Arabia) Al-Hilal	Free	
13 July 2025	FW	88	(Saudi Arabia) Adnan Al-Bishri	(Saudi Arabia) Al-Ittihad	Free	
18 July 2025	FW	94	(Brazil) Marcão	(South Korea) Ulsan HD	Free	
24 July 2025	FW	10	(Brazil) Roberto Firmino	(Qatar) Al Sadd	$8,200,000	
30 July 2025	MF	11	(Brazil) Alexsander	(Brazil) Atlético Mineiro	$7,500,000	
31 July 2025	MF	47	(Saudi Arabia) Ziyad Al-Ghamdi	(Saudi Arabia) Al-Ettifaq	Free	
5 August 2025	MF	29	(Saudi Arabia) Mohammed Al-Majhad	(Saudi Arabia) Al-Ula	Free	
12 August 2025	FW	97	(France) Allan Saint-Maximin	(Mexico) Club América	$12,000,000	
20 August 2025	MF	65	(Saudi Arabia) Faisal Al-Subiani	(Saudi Arabia) Al-Shabab	Free	
10 September 2025	DF	6	(Saudi Arabia) Bassam Al-Hurayji	(Saudi Arabia) Al-Taawoun	Undisclosed	
11 September 2025	MF	73	(Saudi Arabia) Abdulrahman Al-Humayani	(Saudi Arabia) Al-Tai	Free	
12 September 2025	MF	8	(Saudi Arabia) Sumayhan Al-Nabit	(Saudi Arabia) Al-Ula	Undisclosed	
16 September 2025	MF	18	(Saudi Arabia) Younes Al-Shanqiti	(Saudi Arabia) Neom	$533,000	
28 September 2025	GK	21	(Saudi Arabia) Emad Fida	(Saudi Arabia) Al-Riyadh	Free	
3 October 2025	GK	66	(Saudi Arabia) Ghassan Barqawi	(Saudi Arabia) Al-Ain	Free	

=== Loans out ===
Start date	End date	Position	No.	Player	To club	Fee	Ref.
10 September 2025	End of season	DF	31	(Saudi Arabia) Saad Balobaid	(Saudi Arabia) Al-Shabab	None	
10 September 2025	End of season	MF	49	(Saudi Arabia) Firas Al-Ghamdi	(Saudi Arabia) Abha	None	
13 January 2026	End of season	MF	95	(Saudi Arabia) Ayman Fallatah	(Saudi Arabia) Neom	None	
20 January 2026	End of season	DF	88	(Saudi Arabia) Abdulelah Al-Khaibari	(Saudi Arabia) Al-Riyadh	None	

== Pre-season and friendlies ==
18 July 2025 Friendly	Al-Ahli (Saudi Arabia)	2–1	(Austria) WSG Tirol	Wattens, Austria
18:00 CEST	Ibañez 35'; Galeno 77'	Report		Stadium: Gernot Langes Stadion

23 July 2025 Como Cup	Al-Ahli (Saudi Arabia)	1–3	(Italy) Como	Como, Italy
20:30 CEST	Galeno 7'	Report	Cutrone 30'; Demiral 48' (o.g.); Azón 69'	Stadium: Stadio Giuseppe Sinigaglia

26 July 2025 Como Cup	Al-Ahli (Saudi Arabia)	1–1 (3–5 p)	(Scotland) Celtic	Como, Italy
20:30 CEST	Galeno 22'	Report	Trusty 49'	Stadium: Stadio Giuseppe Sinigaglia
	Penalties
	Demiral (penalty scored); Al-Nabit (penalty scored); Majrashi (penalty missed); Saint-Maximin (penalty scored)		(penalty scored) Engels; (penalty scored) Summers; (penalty scored) McCowan; (penalty scored) Welsh; (penalty scored) Yamada

1 August 2025 Friendly	Al-Ahli (Saudi Arabia)	2–0	(Spain) Elche	San Pedro del Pinatar, Spain
10:30 CEST	Al-Buraikan 21'; Toney 90+1' (pen.)	Report		Stadium: Pinatar Arena

5 August 2025 Friendly	Al-Ahli (Saudi Arabia)	1–1	(United Arab Emirates) Al Ain	San Pedro del Pinatar, Spain
11:00 CEST	Traoré 57' (o.g.)	Report	Rahimi 19'	Stadium: Pinatar Arena

15 August 2025 Friendly	Al-Ahli (Saudi Arabia)	4–2	(Saudi Arabia) Al-Riyadh	Jeddah, Saudi Arabia
20:00 AST	Toney; Majrashi; Fallatah; Aboulshamat	Report	Bayesh; Ramírez	Stadium: Prince Mohammed bin Abdullah Al Faisal Stadium

== Competitions ==
=== Overview ===
Competition	First match	Last match	Starting round	Final position	Record							
Competition	First match	Last match	Starting round	Final position	Pld	W	D	L	GF	GA	GD	Win %
Pro League	28 August 2025	21 May 2026	Matchday 1	3rd	34	25	6	3	71	25	+46	73.53
King's Cup	31 August 2025	18 March 2026	Round of 32	Semi-finals	4	2	2	0	12	4	+8	50.00
Super Cup	20 August 2025	23 August 2025	Semi-finals	Winners	2	1	1	0	7	3	+4	50.00
ACL Elite	15 September 2025	25 April 2026	League stage	Winners	12	9	2	1	27	11	+16	75.00
FIFA Intercontinental Cup	23 September 2025		Second round	Second round	1	0	0	1	1	3	−2	0.00
Total					53	37	11	5	118	46	+72	69.81

Source: Competitions

=== Pro League ===
==== League table ====
Pos	Team	Pld	W	D	L	GF	GA	GD	Pts	Qualification or relegation
1	Al-Nassr (C)	34	28	2	4	91	28	+63	86	Qualification for AFC Champions League Elite league stage (Note: Al-Ahli also qualified as 2025–26 AFC Champions League Elite winners.)
2	Al-Hilal	34	25	9	0	85	27	+58	84	Qualification for AFC Champions League Elite league stage
3	Al-Ahli	34	25	6	3	71	25	+46	81	Qualification for AFC Champions League Elite league stage
4	Al-Qadsiah	34	23	8	3	83	34	+49	77	Qualification for AFC Champions League Elite league stage
5	Al-Ittihad	34	16	7	11	55	48	+7	55	Qualification for AFC Champions League Elite preliminary stage

Source: SPL
Rules for classification: 1) Points; 2) Head-to-head points; 3) Head-to-head goal difference; 4) Total goal difference; 5) Total goals scored; 6) Fair-play points
(Note: Head-to-head record is used only after all the matches between the teams in question have been played).
(C) Champions

==== Results summary ====
Overall								Home						Away					
Pld	W	D	L	GF	GA	GD	Pts	W	D	L	GF	GA	GD	W	D	L	GF	GA	GD
34	25	6	3	71	25	+46	81	14	3	0	45	13	+32	11	3	3	26	12	+14

Source: Saudi Pro League

==== Results by round ====
Round	1	2	3	4	5	6	7	8	9	11	12	13	14	15	16	17	18	19	20	21	22	23	10	24	25	26	27	28	29	30	31	32	33	34
Ground	H	A	H	A	H	A	H	A	H	A	H	H	A	H	A	H	A	H	A	H	A	H	A	A	H	A	H	H	A	A	H	A	H	A
Result	W	D	D	W	D	W	D	W	W	L	W	W	W	W	W	W	W	W	D	W	W	W	W	W	W									
Position	8	7	8	7	8	5	5	5	4	4	4	4	4	4	4	3	3	3	3	3	3	3	2	2	2									

Updated to match(es) played on 07 March 2026. Source:
A = Away; H = Home; W = Win; D = Draw; L = Loss

==== Matches ====
All times are local, AST (UTC+3).

Win Draw Loss Postponed

28 August 2025 1	Al-Ahli	1–0	Neom	Jeddah
21:00	Toney 23'; Al-Muwallad (yellow card) 90+5'	Report	Al-Oyayari (yellow card) 45+3'; Hegazi (yellow card) 51'; Al-Hassan (yellow card) 90+7'	Stadium: Alinma Stadium; Attendance: 40,438; Referee: Jesús Valenzuela (Venezuela)

12 September 2025 2	Al-Ettifaq	0–0	Al-Ahli	Dammam
18:25	Calvo (yellow card) 61'; Al-Olayan (yellow card) 65'; Hendry (yellow card) 83'; Dahal (yellow card) 87'	Report	Hawsawi (yellow card) 51'; Ibañez (yellow card) 56'; Majrashi (yellow card) 84'	Stadium: EGO Stadium; Attendance: 9,782; Referee: Anastasios Sidiropoulos (Greece)

19 September 2025 3	Al-Ahli	3–3	Al-Hilal	Jeddah
21:00	Ibañez (yellow card) 36'; Toney 78', 87'; Demiral 90+1'	Report	Hernández 12'; Malcom 24', 41'; Neves (yellow card) 52'	Stadium: Alinma Stadium; Attendance: 51,257; Referee: Alireza Faghani (Iran)

26 September 2025 4	Al-Hazem	0–2	Al-Ahli	Buraidah
18:35	Al-Harbi (yellow card) 68'; Al-Dakheel (yellow card) 90+3'	Report	Gonçalves (yellow card) 20'; Al-Buraikan 72'; Majrashi 80'	Stadium: King Abdullah Sports City; Attendance: 1,612; Referee: Andris Treimanis (Latvia)

17 October 2025 5	Al-Ahli	1–1	Al-Shabab	Jeddah
21:00	Toney 15' (pen.); Majrashi (yellow card) 72'; Millot (yellow card) 90'	Report	Al-Shuwayrikh (red card) 77'; Brownhill 87'; Carrasco (yellow card) 90+1'	Stadium: Alinma Stadium; Attendance: 14,590; Referee: Nicolás Ramírez (Argentina)

23 October 2025 6	Al-Najma	0–1	Al-Ahli	Buraidah
21:00	Jasim (yellow card) 38'; Hawsawi (yellow card) 85'; Flores (yellow card) 90'	Report	Hamed (yellow card) 30'; Al-Buraikan 34'; Millot (yellow card) 43'; Atangana (yellow card) 84'	Stadium: King Abdullah Sports City; Attendance: 2,473; Referee: Clément Turpin (France)

30 October 2025 7	Al-Ahli	1–1	Al-Riyadh	Jeddah
20:30	Toney 90+1' (pen.); Mendy (yellow card) 90+9'; Al-Johani (red card) 90+12'; Abu Al-Shamat (yellow card) 90+17'	Report	Sahlouli (yellow card) 19'; González (yellow card) 87'; Tombakti (yellow card) 88'; Tozé 90+11' (pen.)	Stadium: Prince Abdullah Al-Faisal Sports City Stadium; Attendance: 8,549; Referee: Rade Obrenovič (Slovenia)

8 November 2025 8	Al-Ittihad	0–1	Al-Ahli	Jeddah
20:30		Report	Millot (yellow card) 51'; Mahrez 55', (yellow card) 90+3'; Sulaiman (yellow card) 56'; Gonçalves (yellow card) 76'	Stadium: Alinma Stadium; Attendance: 46,027; Referee: Szymon Marciniak (Poland)

21 November 2025 9	Al-Ahli	2–1	Al-Qadsiah	Jeddah
20:30	Galeno 6'; Atangana (yellow card) 29'; Al-Johani (red card) 45+4'; Kessié 66'; Al-Rashidi (yellow card) 71'; Al-Muwallad (yellow card) 73'	Report	Nacho (yellow card) 45+4'; Al-Salem 64'	Stadium: Alinma Stadium; Attendance: 17,404; Referee: Juan Martínez Munuera (Spain)

26 December 2025 11	Al-Fateh	2–1	Al-Ahli	Al-Hasa
16:05	Vargas 43', 47'; Delgado (yellow card) 69'	Report	Atangana 22'; Majrashi (yellow card) 36'; Millot (yellow card) 49'; Abu Al-Shamat (yellow card) 85'	Stadium: Maydan Tamweel Aloula; Attendance: 10,982; Referee: Khalid Al-Turais

30 December 2025 12	Al-Ahli	2–0	Al-Fayha	Jeddah
18:30	Toney 6'; Atangana (yellow card) 20'; Hawsawi (yellow card) 51'; Ibañez 64', (red card) 85'; Al-Muwallad (yellow card) 74'; Abu Al-Shamat (yellow card) 77'	Report	Al-Mutairi (yellow card) 15'	Stadium: Prince Abdullah Al-Faisal Sports City Stadium; Attendance: 4,259; Referee: Faisal Al-Blwi

2 January 2026 13	Al-Ahli	3–2	Al-Nassr	Jeddah
20:30	Toney 7', 20'; Demiral 55', (yellow card) 90+12'; Atangana (yellow card) 66'; Al-Sanbi (yellow card) 79'; Abu Al-Shamat (yellow card) 90+4'; Majrashi (red card) 90+6'	Report	Al-Amri 31', 44'; Yahya (yellow card) 61'; Martinez (yellow card) 89'; Félix (yellow card) 90+6'; Boushal (red card) 90+9'	Stadium: Alinma Stadium; Attendance: 41,315; Referee: Irfan Peljto (Bosnia and Herzegovina)

10 January 2026 14	Al-Okhdood	0–1	Al-Ahli	Najran
20:30	Pedroza (yellow card) 6'; Petros (yellow card) 55'; Al-Salem (yellow card) 89'; Asiri (yellow card) 90+2'	Report	Gonçalves (yellow card) 45+4'; Millot (yellow card) 48'; Toney 58', (yellow card) 90+2'	Stadium: Prince Hathloul bin Abdulaziz Sports City; Attendance: 4,361; Referee: Khaled Al-Turais

14 January 2026 15	Al-Ahli	2–1	Al-Taawoun	Jeddah
20:30	Demiral (yellow card) 31'; Millot (yellow card) 49'; Ibañez (yellow card) 56' (yellow-red card) 83'; Hawsawi 62'; Toney 90+14' (pen.)	Report	Al-Ahmed (yellow card) 26'; El Mahdioui (yellow card) 31'; Martínez 45+1' (pen.), (yellow card) 90+5'; Al-Mufarrij (yellow card) 90+3'	Stadium: Alinma Stadium; Attendance: 32,612; Referee: Mohammed Al-Hoaish

17 January 2026 16	Al-Kholood	0–1	Al-Ahli	Buraidah
18:10	Bahebri (yellow card) 45+2'; Cozzani (yellow card) 86'	Report	Toney 74'; Demiral (yellow card) 86'; Millot (yellow card) 90+4'; Al-Sanbi (yellow card) 90+6'	Stadium: King Abdullah Sports City; Attendance: 2,298; Referee: Majed Al-Shamrani

20 January 2026 17	Al-Ahli	4–1	Al-Khaleej	Jeddah
20:30	Toney (yellow card) 46', (goal) 59', 67', 77'; Hawsawi (yellow card) 51'; Demiral (yellow card) 57'; Hamed 86'	Report	Masouras 19'; Schenkeveld (yellow card) 37'; Moris (yellow card) 65'; Al Haydar (yellow card) 90+3'	Stadium: Alinma Stadium; Attendance: 15,067; Referee: Abdullah Al-Owaydan

24 January 2026 18	Neom	0–3	Al-Ahli	Tabuk
20:30	Zézé (yellow card) 41'; Al-Dawsari (red card) 61'; Al-Faraj (yellow card) 68'	Report	Kessié (yellow card) 45+1'; Toney 55' (pen.); Mahrez 64'; Millot 67'; Hawsawi (yellow card) 82'; Majrashi (yellow card) 89'	Stadium: King Khalid Sport City Stadium; Attendance: 6,967; Referee: Mohammed Al-Ismail

28 January 2026 19	Al-Ahli	4–0	Al-Ettifaq	Jeddah
20:30	Toney 17', 27' (pen.), 83' (pen.); Atangana 64'	Report	Al-Sebyani (yellow card) 47'	Stadium: Alinma Stadium; Attendance: 38,870; Referee: Faisal Al-Blwi

2 February 2026 20	Al-Hilal	0–0	Al-Ahli	Riyadh
20:30				Stadium: Kingdom Arena

5 February 2026 21	Al-Ahli	2–0	Al-Hazem	Jeddah
20:00				Stadium: Alinma Stadium

13 February 2026 22	Al-Shabab	2–5	Al-Ahli	Riyadh
16:50				Stadium: Al-Shabab Club Stadium

19 February 2026 23	Al-Ahli	4–1	Al-Najma	Jeddah
21:00				Stadium: Prince Abdullah Al-Faisal Sports City

23 February 2026 10	Damac	0–1	Al-Ahli	Abha
16:45				Stadium: Prince Sultan bin Abdulaziz Sports City Stadium

26 February 2026 24	Al-Riyadh	0–1	Al-Ahli	Riyadh
21:00				Stadium: Prince Faisal bin Fahd Sports City Stadium

6 March 2026 25	Al-Ahli	v	Al-Ittihad	Jeddah
21:00				Stadium: Alinma Stadium

13 March 2026 26	Al-Qadsiah	v	Al-Ahli	Dammam
21:00				Stadium: Prince Mohamed bin Fahd Stadium

4 April 2026 27	Al-Ahli	v	Damac	Jeddah
20:15				Stadium: Prince Abdullah Al-Faisal Sports City

7 April 2026 29	Al-Fayha	v	Al-Ahli	Al Majma'ah
19:55				Stadium: Al Majma'ah Sports City

11 April 2026 28	Al-Ahli	v	Al-Fateh	Jeddah
20:20				Stadium: Prince Abdullah Al-Faisal Sports City

27 April 2026 30	Al-Nassr	v	Al-Ahli	Riyadh
TBC				Stadium: Al-Awwal Park

2 May 2026 31	Al-Ahli	v	Al-Okhdood	Jeddah
TBC				Stadium: Prince Abdullah Al-Faisal Sports City

7 May 2026 32	Al-Taawoun	v	Al-Ahli	Buraidah
TBC				Stadium: King Abdullah Sports City

13 May 2026 33	Al-Ahli	v	Al-Kholood	Jeddah
TBC				Stadium: Prince Abdullah Al-Faisal Sports City

21 May 2026 34	Al-Khaleej	v	Al-Ahli	Dammam
TBC				Stadium: Prince Mohamed bin Fahd Stadium

=== King's Cup ===
All times are local, AST (UTC+3).

31 August 2025 Round of 32	Al-Arabi	0–5	Al-Ahli	Buraidah
19:00	Al-Sawadi (yellow card) 74'; Sheldon (yellow card) 80'	Report	Toney 31' (pen.), 82', 90+3' (pen.); Millot 45+6'; Al-Rashidi 68'	Stadium: King Abdullah Sports City; Attendance: 1,190; Referee: Florian Badstübner (Germany)

27 October 2025 Round of 16	Al-Batin	0–3	Al-Ahli	Hafar al-Batin
21:00	Al-Sahli (yellow card) 89'	Report	Al-Jalfan 22' (o.g.); Al-Buraikan 50'; Toney 66'; Al-Muwallad (yellow card) 90+3'	Stadium: Al-Batin Club Stadium; Attendance: 1,580; Referee: Radu Petrescu (Romania)

28 November 2025 Quarter-finals	Al-Ahli	3–3 (a.e.t.) (5–4 p)	Al-Qadsiah	Jeddah
20:30	Toney 36' (pen.); Ibañez (yellow card) 45+7'; Atangana 61', (yellow card) 77'; Kessié 73'; Mendy (yellow card) 90+2'	Report	Retegui 11', 45+4' (pen.); Quiñones 30'; Casteels (yellow card) 45+6'	Stadium: Prince Abdullah Al-Faisal Sports City Stadium; Attendance: 16,661; Referee: Luís Godinho (Portugal)
	Penalties
	Toney (penalty scored); Mahrez (penalty scored); Kessié (penalty scored); Abu Al-Shamat (penalty scored); Al-Buraikan (penalty scored)		(penalty scored) Retegui; (penalty missed) Al Salem; (penalty scored) Weigl; (penalty scored) Al-Juwayr; (penalty scored) Nacho

18 March 2026 Semi-finals	Al-Ahli	v	Al-Hilal	Jeddah
22:00				Stadium: Alinma Stadium

=== AFC Champions League Elite ===
==== League stage ====
Pos	Team	Pld	W	D	L	GF	GA	GD	Pts	Qualification
1	(Saudi Arabia) Al Hilal	8	7	1	0	17	6	+11	22	Advance to round of 16
2	(Saudi Arabia) Al-Ahli	8	5	2	1	21	9	+12	17	Advance to round of 16
3	(Iran) Tractor	8	5	2	1	12	4	+8	17	Advance to round of 16
4	(Saudi Arabia) Al-Ittihad	8	5	0	3	22	9	+13	15	Advance to round of 16
5	(United Arab Emirates) Al Wahda	8	4	2	2	11	7	+4	14	Advance to round of 16

Source: AFC
Rules for classification: 1) points; 2) goal difference; 3) number of goals scored; 4) number of matches won; 5) penalty shoot-out if only two teams remain tied and played each other on the final matchday 6) fair play ranking; 7) drawing of lots

15 September 2025 1	Al-Ahli (Saudi Arabia)	4–2	(Uzbekistan) Nasaf	Jeddah, Saudi Arabia
21:15 UTC+3	Ibañez (yellow card) 48'; Millot (yellow card) 63', (goal) 65', 68'; Mahrez 90+4'; Sulaiman 90+15'	Report	Norchaev 34', 41'; Bakhromov (yellow card) 47'; Abdurakhmatov (yellow card) 54'; Davronov (red card) 90+13'	Stadium: King Abdullah Sports City Stadium; Attendance: 20,666; Referee: Ryo Tanimoto (Japan)

29 September 2025 2	Al-Duhail (Qatar)	2–2	(Saudi Arabia) Al-Ahli	Al Rayyan, Qatar
21:15 UTC+3	Edmilson 25'; Piątek 48'; Verratti (yellow card) 82'	Report	Gonçalves (yellow card) 10', (goal) 42'; Mahrez 45+1'; Kessié (yellow card) 74'	Stadium: Khalifa International Stadium; Attendance: 5,731; Referee: Omar Al-Ali (United Arab Emirates)

20 October 2025 3	Al-Ahli (Saudi Arabia)	4–0	(Qatar) Al-Gharafa	Jeddah, Saudi Arabia
21:15 UTC+3	Millot 32', (yellow card) 71'; Kessié 38', 41'; Demiral (yellow card) 44'; Abu Al-Shamat 76'	Report	Al-Alwi (yellow card) 63'	Stadium: King Abdullah Sports City Stadium; Attendance: 8,484; Referee: Ma Ning (China)

4 November 2025 4	Al-Sadd (Qatar)	1–2	(Saudi Arabia) Al-Ahli	Doha, Qatar
19:00 UTC+3	Suhail (yellow card) 41'; Claudinho 63'; Afif (yellow card) 90+8'	Report	Dams (yellow card) 8'; Mahrez 34'; Gonçalves 68'; Ibañez (yellow card) 70'; Majrashi (yellow card) 88'	Stadium: Jassim bin Hamad Stadium; Attendance: 13,038; Referee: Shaun Evans (Australia)

24 November 2025 5	Al-Ahli (Saudi Arabia)	0–1	(United Arab Emirates) Sharjah	Jeddah, Saudi Arabia
21:15 UTC+3		Report	O. Camara 81'	Stadium: King Abdullah Sports City Stadium; Attendance: 18,117; Referee: Ilgiz Tantashev (Uzbekistan)

22 December 2025 6	Al-Shorta (Iraq)	0–5	(Saudi Arabia) Al-Ahli	Baghdad, Iraq
21:15 UTC+3		Report	Ibañez 30'; Toney 56'; Galeno 72'; Abu Al-Shamat 81'; Al-Johani 86'	Stadium: Al Zawraa Stadium; Attendance: 4,864; Referee: Adel Al-Naqbi (United Arab Emirates)

9 February 2026 7	Al Wahda (United Arab Emirates)	0–0	(Saudi Arabia) Al-Ahli	Abu Dhabi, United Arab Emirates
17:45 UTC+4		Report		Stadium: Al Nahyan Stadium; Attendance: 2,233; Referee: Alireza Faghani (Australia)

16 February 2026 8	Al-Ahli (Saudi Arabia)	4–3	(United Arab Emirates) Shabab Al Ahli	Jeddah, Saudi Arabia
19:00 UTC+3	Al-Buraikan 12'; Planić 35' (o.g.); Millot 45+3'; Abu Al-Shamat 52'	Report	Breno 66' 78'; Juma 90+5'	Stadium: King Abdullah Sports City Stadium; Attendance: 6,166; Referee: (Kuwait)

Knockout Stage

Round of 16

The round of 16 for the West region was postponed due to the impacts from the 2026 Iran War. On March 24, AFC announced that all West Region Round of 16 matchups will be changed to single-leg ties at a centralized venue.

13 April 2026 Round of 16	Al-Ahli (Saudi Arabia)	1–0 (a.e.t.)	(Qatar) Al-Duhail	Jeddah, Saudi Arabia
17:45 UTC+3	Mahrez 117'	Report		Stadium: King Abdullah Sports City Stadium (Note: Due to the impacts from the 2026 Iran war, the AFC decided to play the tie as a one-legged tie.); Attendance: 25,355; Referee: Ma Ning (China)

Quarter-Finals

17 April 2026 Quarter-finals	Al-Ahli (Saudi Arabia)	2–1	(Malaysia) Johor Darul Ta'zim	Jeddah, Saudi Arabia
17:45 UTC+3				Stadium: King Abdullah Sports City Stadium

=== Saudi Super Cup ===
20 August 2025 Semi-finals	Al-Qadsiah	1–5	Al-Ahli	So Kon Po, Hong Kong
20:00 UTC+8	Álvarez 8'; Thakri (yellow card) 15'; Bonsu Baah (red card) 41'	Report	Kessié 12', 45+2'; Toney 28' (pen.), (yellow card) 56'; Millot 31'; Nacho 61' (o.g.)	Stadium: Hong Kong Stadium; Attendance: 16,253; Referee: Ricardo de Burgos Bengoetxea (Spain)

23 August 2025 Final	Al-Nassr	2–2 (3–5 p)	Al-Ahli	So Kon Po, Hong Kong
20:00 UTC+8	Wesley (yellow card) 30'; Ronaldo 41' (pen.); Brozović (yellow card) 53', (goal) 82'; Boushal (yellow card) 90+3'	Report	Toney (yellow card) 12'; Kessié (yellow card) 39', (goal) 45+6'; Demiral (yellow card) 51'; Dams (yellow card) 74'; Ibañez 89'	Stadium: Hong Kong Stadium; Attendance: 30,240; Referee: Mohammed Al-Hoaish
	Penalties
	Ronaldo (penalty scored); Brozović (penalty scored); Félix (penalty scored); Al-Khaibari (penalty missed)		(penalty scored) Toney; (penalty scored) Kessié; (penalty scored) Mahrez; (penalty scored) Al-Buraikan; (penalty scored) Galeno

=== FIFA Intercontinental Cup ===
23 September 2025 African–Asian–Pacific Cup	Al-Ahli (Saudi Arabia)	1–3	(Egypt) Pyramids	Jeddah, Saudi Arabia
21:00 UTC+3	Toney 45' (pen.)	Report	Zalaka (yellow card) 13'; Mayele 21', 71', 75'; Hamdy (yellow card) 86'	Stadium: King Abdullah Sports City; Attendance: 49,284; Referee: István Kovács (Romania)

== Statistics ==
=== Appearances ===
Last updated on 28 January 2026.

No.	Pos	Nat	Player	Total		Pro League		King's Cup		ACL Elite		Super Cup		Intercontinental Cup	
No.	Pos	Nat	Player	Apps	Goals	Apps	Goals	Apps	Goals	Apps	Goals	Apps	Goals	Apps	Goals
Goalkeepers
1	GK	(Saudi Arabia) KSA	Abdulrahman Al-Sanbi	10	0	7	0	1	0	2	0	0	0	0	0
16	GK	(Senegal) SEN	Édouard Mendy	20	0	11	0	2	0	4	0	2	0	1	0
62	GK	(Saudi Arabia) KSA	Abdullah Abdoh	0	0	0	0	0	0	0	0	0	0	0	0
72	GK	(Saudi Arabia) KSA	Salman Al-Jadani	0	0	0	0	0	0	0	0	0	0	0	0
Defenders
2	DF	(Saudi Arabia) KSA	Zakaria Hawsawi	15	1	9+2	1	0	0	0+3	0	0	0	0+1	0
3	DF	(Brazil) BRA	Roger Ibañez	25	3	14	1	3	0	5	1	2	1	1	0
5	DF	(Saudi Arabia) KSA	Mohammed Sulaiman	21	1	8+5	0	0+2	0	3+3	1	0	0	0	0
27	DF	(Saudi Arabia) KSA	Ali Majrashi	25	1	14	1	2+1	0	5	0	1+1	0	0+1	0
28	DF	(Turkey) TUR	Merih Demiral	24	2	15	2	3	0	3	0	2	0	1	0
29	DF	(Saudi Arabia) KSA	Mohammed Abdulrahman	22	0	3+10	0	1+2	0	1+3	0	1	0	1	0
32	DF	(Belgium) BEL	Matteo Dams	15	0	2+1	0	3	0	6	0	2	0	1	0
46	DF	(Saudi Arabia) KSA	Rayan Hamed	10	1	4+4	1	0	0	1+1	0	0	0	0	0
60	DF	(Saudi Arabia) KSA	Yazan Madani	1	0	0+1	0	0	0	0	0	0	0	0	0
Midfielders
6	MF	(France) FRA	Valentin Atangana	19	3	11	2	2	1	4+1	0	0	0	1	0
10	MF	(France) FRA	Enzo Millot	23	6	13+1	1	1	1	5	3	2	1	1	0
14	MF	(Saudi Arabia) KSA	Eid Al-Muwallad	12	0	0+10	0	0+1	0	0	0	0+1	0	0	0
19	MF	(Saudi Arabia) KSA	Fahad Al-Rashidi	8	1	0+3	0	0+2	1	2	0	0+1	0	0	0
20	MF	(Brazil) BRA	Matheus Gonçalves	22	2	10+3	0	2	0	4+2	2	0	0	0+1	0
23	MF	(Saudi Arabia) KSA	Ibrahim Azzam	0	0	0	0	0	0	0	0	0	0	0	0
26	MF	(Saudi Arabia) KSA	Yaseen Al-Zubaidi	4	0	0+1	0	0+1	0	0+1	0	0+1	0	0	0
30	MF	(Saudi Arabia) KSA	Ziyad Al-Johani	19	1	9+3	0	2	0	3+2	1	0	0	0	0
40	MF	(Saudi Arabia) KSA	Ziyad Mallah	0	0	0	0	0	0	0	0	0	0	0	0
47	MF	(Saudi Arabia) KSA	Saleh Aboulshamat	26	2	2+13	0	1+2	0	1+5	2	0+1	0	0+1	0
79	MF	(Ivory Coast) CIV	Franck Kessié	23	7	13	1	2	1	4+1	2	2	3	1	0
87	MF	(Saudi Arabia) KSA	Ramez Al-Attar	0	0	0	0	0	0	0	0	0	0	0	0
Forwards
7	FW	(Algeria) ALG	Riyad Mahrez	24	5	14	2	2	0	5	3	2	0	1	0
9	FW	(Saudi Arabia) KSA	Firas Al-Buraikan	28	3	10+8	2	1+1	1	4+1	0	2	0	0+1	0
13	FW	(Brazil) BRA	Galeno	20	2	11+1	1	2	0	1+2	1	2	0	1	0
17	FW	(England) ENG	Ivan Toney	28	26	16+1	18	3	5	3+2	1	2	1	1	1
77	FW	(Brazil) BRA	Ricardo Mathias	1	0	0+1	0	0	0	0	0	0	0	0	0
Players sent out on loan this season
31	DF	(Saudi Arabia) KSA	Saad Balobaid	2	0	1	0	0	0	0	0	0+1	0	0	0
88	DF	(Saudi Arabia) KSA	Abdulelah Al-Khaibari	5	0	1+3	0	0+1	0	0	0	0	0	0	0
95	MF	(Saudi Arabia) KSA	Ayman Fallatah	0	0	0	0	0	0	0	0	0	0	0	0

=== Goalscorers ===
Rank	No.	Pos	Nat	Name	Pro League	King's Cup	ACL Elite	Super Cup	Intercontinental Cup	Total
1	17	FW	(England)	Ivan Toney	18	5	1	1	1	26
2	79	MF	(Ivory Coast)	Franck Kessié	1	1	2	3	0	7
3	10	MF	(France)	Enzo Millot	1	1	3	1	0	6
4	7	FW	(Algeria)	Riyad Mahrez	2	0	3	0	0	5
5	3	DF	(Brazil)	Roger Ibañez	1	0	1	1	0	3
5	6	MF	(France)	Valentin Atangana	2	1	0	0	0	3
5	9	FW	(Saudi Arabia)	Firas Al-Buraikan	2	1	0	0	0	3
8	13	FW	(Brazil)	Galeno	1	0	1	0	0	2
8	20	MF	(Brazil)	Matheus Gonçalves	0	0	2	0	0	2
8	28	DF	(Turkey)	Merih Demiral	2	0	0	0	0	2
8	47	MF	(Saudi Arabia)	Saleh Aboulshamat	0	0	2	0	0	2
12	2	DF	(Saudi Arabia)	Zakaria Hawsawi	1	0	0	0	0	1
12	5	DF	(Saudi Arabia)	Mohammed Sulaiman	0	0	1	0	0	1
12	19	MF	(Saudi Arabia)	Fahad Al-Rashidi	0	1	0	0	0	1
12	27	DF	(Saudi Arabia)	Ali Majrashi	1	0	0	0	0	1
12	30	MF	(Saudi Arabia)	Ziyad Al-Johani	0	0	1	0	0	1
12	46	DF	(Saudi Arabia)	Rayan Hamed	1	0	0	0	0	1
Own goal					0	1	0	1	0	2
Total					33	11	17	7	1	69

Last Updated: 28 January 2026

=== Assists ===
Rank	No.	Pos	Nat	Name	Pro League	King's Cup	ACL Elite	Super Cup	Intercontinental Cup	Total
1	7	FW	(Algeria)	Riyad Mahrez	4	1	1	3	0	9
2	17	FW	(England)	Ivan Toney	4	1	3	0	0	8
3	13	FW	(Brazil)	Galeno	3	0	2	0	0	5
4	10	MF	(France)	Enzo Millot	2	0	1	1	0	4
4	27	DF	(Saudi Arabia)	Ali Majrashi	3	0	1	0	0	4
6	20	MF	(Brazil)	Matheus Gonçalves	1	0	2	0	0	3
7	32	DF	(Belgium)	Matteo Dams	0	1	1	0	0	2
7	47	MF	(Saudi Arabia)	Saleh Aboulshamat	0	0	2	0	0	2
7	79	MF	(Ivory Coast)	Franck Kessié	1	1	0	0	0	2
10	3	DF	(Brazil)	Roger Ibañez	1	0	0	0	0	1
10	9	FW	(Saudi Arabia)	Firas Al-Buraikan	1	0	0	0	0	1
10	29	DF	(Saudi Arabia)	Mohammed Abdulrahman	0	1	0	0	0	1
10	30	MF	(Saudi Arabia)	Ziyad Al-Johani	1	0	0	0	0	1
Total					21	5	13	4	0	43

Last Updated: 28 January 2026

=== Clean sheets ===
Rank	No.	Pos	Nat	Name	Pro League	King's Cup	ACL Elite	Super Cup	Intercontinental Cup	Total
1	16	GK	(Senegal)	Édouard Mendy	7	1	1	0	0	9
2	1	GK	(Saudi Arabia)	Abdulrahman Al-Sanbi	3	1	1	0	0	5
Total					10	2	2	0	0	14

Last Updated: 28 January 2026
