= 2023–24 Al-Ahli Saudi FC season =

Al-Ahli
2023–24 season
- President: Khalid Al-Eissa
- Manager: Matthias Jaissle
- Stadium: King Abdullah Sports City
- Pro League: 3rd
- King Cup: Round of 16 (knocked out by Abha)
- Top goalscorer: League: Firas Al-Buraikan (13); All: Firas Al-Buraikan (15)
- Highest home attendance: 52,037 (vs. Al-Nassr, 15 March 2024)
- Lowest home attendance: 8,489 (vs. Al-Fayha, 27 May 2024)
- Average home league attendance: 24,370
Home colours	Away colours	Third colours

The 2023–24 season was Al-Ahli's 87th year in existence and 47th season in the Pro League. The club participated in the Pro League and the King Cup.

The season covers the period from 1 July 2023 to 30 June 2024.

== Players ==
=== Squad information ===
As of 1 February 2024

Note: Flags indicate national team as defined under FIFA eligibility rules; some limited exceptions apply. Players may hold more than one non-FIFA nationality.

No.	Pos.	Nation	Player
1	GK	KSA	Abdulrahman Al-Sanbi
3	DF	BRA	Roger Ibañez
6	DF	KSA	Bassam Al-Hurayji
7	FW	ALG	Riyad Mahrez
8	MF	KSA	Sumayhan Al-Nabit
10	FW	BRA	Roberto Firmino (captain)
14	MF	KSA	Abdullah Otayf
15	DF	KSA	Abdullah Al-Ammar
16	GK	SEN	Édouard Mendy
17	FW	KSA	Haitham Asiri
18	MF	KSA	Younes Al-Shanqiti
19	MF	KSA	Fahad Al-Rashidi
20	FW	KSA	Firas Al-Buraikan
21	GK	KSA	Emad Fida
24	MF	ESP	Gabri Veiga
26	DF	KSA	Fahad Al-Hamad

No.	Pos.	Nation	Player
27	DF	KSA	Ali Majrashi
28	DF	TUR	Merih Demiral
29	MF	KSA	Mohammed Al-Majhad
30	MF	KSA	Ziyad Al-Johani
31	DF	KSA	Saad Balobaid
34	DF	KSA	Bandar Al-Shamrani
37	DF	KSA	Abdulbasit Hindi
40	MF	KSA	Ali Al-Asmari
45	MF	KSA	Abdulkarim Darisi
46	DF	KSA	Rayane Hamidou
62	GK	KSA	Abdullah Abdoh
65	DF	KSA	Faisal Al-Sibyani
73	MF	KSA	Abdulrahman Al-Humayani
79	MF	CIV	Franck Kessie
95	MF	KSA	Ayman Fallatah
97	FW	FRA	Allan Saint-Maximin

=== Out on loan ===
Note: Flags indicate national team as defined under FIFA eligibility rules; some limited exceptions apply. Players may hold more than one non-FIFA nationality.

No.	Pos.	Nation	Player
13	DF	KSA	Ibrahim Al-Zubaidi (at Abha until 30 June 2024)
35	DF	KSA	Ahmed Al-Nakhli (at Al-Kholood until 30 June 2024)
39	MF	KSA	Yaseen Al-Zubaidi (at Al-Okhdood until 30 June 2024)
66	DF	KSA	Abdulrahman Al-Zahrani (at Al-Bukiryah until 30 June 2024)

No.	Pos.	Nation	Player
92	FW	GAM	Modou Barrow (at Sivasspor until 30 June 2024)
94	FW	BRA	Marcão (at Fatih Karagümrük until 30 June 2024)
—	GK	KSA	Ghassan Barqawi (at Al-Ain until 30 June 2024)
—	FW	KSA	Mourad Khodari (at Al-Okhdood until 30 June 2024)

== Transfers and loans ==
=== Transfers in ===
Entry date	Position	No.	Player	From club	Fee	Ref.
30 June 2023	DF	11	(North Macedonia) Ezgjan Alioski	(Turkey) Fenerbahçe	End of loan	
30 June 2023	DF	31	(Saudi Arabia) Hani Al-Sebyani	(Saudi Arabia) Al-Khaleej	End of loan	
30 June 2023	MF	20	(Senegal) Alassane Ndao	(Turkey) Antalyaspor	End of loan	
30 June 2023	FW	9	(Syria) Omar Al Somah	(Qatar) Al-Arabi	End of loan	
1 July 2023	GK	16	(Senegal) Édouard Mendy	(England) Chelsea	$20,000,000	
1 July 2023	MF	8	(Saudi Arabia) Sumayhan Al-Nabit	(Saudi Arabia) Al-Taawoun	Free	
1 July 2023	MF	14	(Saudi Arabia) Abdullah Otayf	(Saudi Arabia) Al-Hilal	Free	
1 July 2023	MF	19	(Saudi Arabia) Fahad Al-Rashidi	(Saudi Arabia) Al-Taawoun	Free	
5 July 2023	FW	10	(Brazil) Roberto Firmino	(England) Liverpool	Free	
28 July 2023	FW	7	(Algeria) Riyad Mahrez	(England) Manchester City	$38,500,000	
30 July 2023	FW	97	(France) Allan Saint-Maximin	(England) Newcastle United	$29,500,000	
6 August 2023	DF	6	(Saudi Arabia) Bassam Al-Hurayji	(Saudi Arabia) Al-Batin	$1,000,000	
9 August 2023	MF	79	(Ivory Coast) Franck Kessié	(Spain) Barcelona	$13,700,000	
10 August 2023	DF	3	(Brazil) Roger Ibañez	(Italy) Roma	$31,300,000	
19 August 2023	DF	28	(Turkey) Merih Demiral	(Italy) Atalanta	$19,600,000	
26 August 2023	MF	24	(Spain) Gabri Veiga	(Spain) Celta Vigo	$38,800,000	
3 September 2023	FW	20	(Saudi Arabia) Firas Al-Buraikan	(Saudi Arabia) Al-Fateh	$10,600,000	
7 September 2023	DF	15	(Saudi Arabia) Abdullah Al-Ammar	(Saudi Arabia) Damac	$4,000,000	
7 September 2023	DF	31	(Saudi Arabia) Saad Balobaid	(Saudi Arabia) Al-Taawoun	$5,300,000	

=== Transfers out ===
Exit date	Position	No.	Player	To club	Fee	Ref.
30 June 2023	DF	38	(Saudi Arabia) Naif Kariri	(Saudi Arabia) Al-Wehda	End of loan	
30 June 2023	DF	99	(Saudi Arabia) Mansour Al-Shammari	(Saudi Arabia) Al-Nassr	End of loan	
30 June 2023	FW	18	(Saudi Arabia) Thamer Al-Ali	(Saudi Arabia) Al-Wehda	End of loan	
1 July 2023	DF	5	(Saudi Arabia) Talal Al-Absi	(Saudi Arabia) Al-Hazem	Free	
1 July 2023	MF	6	(Cameroon) Franck Kom	(United Arab Emirates) Emirates	Free	
21 July 2023	FW	9	(Syria) Omar Al Somah	(Qatar) Al-Arabi	Free	
30 July 2023	MF	7	(Netherlands) Hicham Faik	(Saudi Arabia) Al-Bukiryah	Free	
7 August 2023	MF	16	(Uruguay) Nicolás Milesi	(Uruguay) Plaza Colonia	Free	
11 August 2023	MF	14	(Saudi Arabia) Firas Al-Ghamdi	(Saudi Arabia) Al-Raed	Free	
11 August 2023	MF	20	(Senegal) Alassane Ndao	(Turkey) İstanbulspor	Free	
29 August 2023	DF	23	(Angola) Bastos	(Brazil) Botafogo	Free	
7 September 2023	DF	31	(Saudi Arabia) Hani Al-Sebyani	(Saudi Arabia) Al-Faisaly	Free	
7 September 2023	MF	32	(Saudi Arabia) Eyad Madani	(Saudi Arabia) Al-Taawoun	Undisclosed	
7 September 2023	FW	18	(Saudi Arabia) Abdullah Al-Mogren	(Saudi Arabia) Al-Fateh	$1,333,000	
7 September 2023	FW	77	(Saudi Arabia) Hassan Al-Ali	(Saudi Arabia) Abha	$533,000	
10 September 2023	DF	75	(Saudi Arabia) Abdullah Masoud	(Saudi Arabia) Al-Kholood	Free	
11 September 2023	MF	10	(Saudi Arabia) Salman Al-Moasher	(Saudi Arabia) Al-Tai	Free	
12 September 2023	DF	–	(Saudi Arabia) Ahmed Fallatah	(Saudi Arabia) Wej	Free	
12 September 2023	MF	9	(Algeria) Ryad Boudebouz	(Saudi Arabia) Ohod	Free	
13 September 2023	DF	2	(Saudi Arabia) Manaf Abo Yabes	(Saudi Arabia) Ohod	Free	
28 January 2024	GK	71	(Saudi Arabia) Mohammed Al-Rubaie	(Saudi Arabia) Al-Hilal	Free	

=== Loans out ===
Start date	End date	Position	No.	Player	To club	Fee	Ref.
27 July 2023	1 January 2024	FW	94	(Brazil) Marcão	(China) Wuhan Three Towns	None	
2 August 2023	End of season	GK	–	(Saudi Arabia) Ghassan Barqawi	(Saudi Arabia) Al-Ain	None	
28 August 2023	End of season	MF	92	(The Gambia) Modou Barrow	(Turkey) Sivasspor	None	
31 August 2023	End of season	FW	24	(Saudi Arabia) Mourad Khodari	(Saudi Arabia) Al-Okhdood	None	
1 September 2023	End of season	DF	66	(Saudi Arabia) Abdulrahman Al-Zahrani	(Saudi Arabia) Al-Bukiryah	None	
10 September 2023	End of season	DF	35	(Saudi Arabia) Ahmed Al-Nakhli	(Saudi Arabia) Al-Kholood	None	
30 January 2024	End of season	DF	13	(Saudi Arabia) Ibrahim Al-Zubaidi	(Saudi Arabia) Abha	None	
1 February 2024	End of season	MF	39	(Saudi Arabia) Yaseen Al-Zubaidi	(Saudi Arabia) Al-Okhdood	None	
9 February 2024	End of season	FW	94	(Brazil) Marcão	(Turkey) Fatih Karagümrük	None	

== Pre-season ==
19 July 2023 Friendly	Al-Ahli (Saudi Arabia)	18–0	(Austria) USV Stuhlfelden	Stuhlfelden, Austria
19:00 CEST	Firmino 5' (pen.), 14'; Boudebouz 8'; Al-Nabit 16', 25', 33'; Al-Rashidi 20', 27', 30'; Al-Asmari 38'; Khodari 48', 51', 54', 57', 60', 75'; Al-Shamrani 63'; Al-Mogren 68'	Report		Stadium: Sportplatz Stuhlfelden

25 July 2023 Friendly	Al-Ahli (Saudi Arabia)	1–2	(Austria) St. Pölten	Biberbach, Austria
18:00 CEST	Al-Rashidi 40'	Report	Barlov 58', 82'	Stadium: Peter Lisec Stadion

29 July 2023 Friendly	Al-Ahli (Saudi Arabia)	2–6	(Germany) 1. FC Heidenheim	Kirchbichl, Austria
16:00 CEST	Boudebouz 44'; Al-Majhad 77'	Report	Pieringer 41', 43'; Thomalla 61'; Schöppner 68'; Theuerkauf 70'; Dinkçi 91'	Stadium: SVK-Arena

1 August 2023 Friendly	Al-Ahli (Saudi Arabia)	5–0	(Qatar) Al-Shamal	Bad Wimsbach-Neydharting, Austria
16:45 CEST	Firmino 38', 69'; Saint-Maximin 51'; Hindi 74'; Al-Rashidi 87'	Report		Stadium: Stadion Bad Wimsbach

8 August 2023 Friendly	Al-Ahli (Saudi Arabia)	2–2	(Saudi Arabia) Al-Wehda	Jeddah, Saudi Arabia
21:00	Boudebouz; Al-Nabit			Stadium: Prince Mohammed bin Abdullah Al Faisal Stadium

12 August 2023 Friendly	Al-Ahli (Saudi Arabia)	1–1	(Saudi Arabia) Jeddah	Jeddah
19:40				Stadium: Prince Mohammed bin Abdullah Al Faisal Stadium

19 January 2024 Friendly	Al-Ahli (Saudi Arabia)	4–1	(Saudi Arabia) Abha	Jeddah, Saudi Arabia
18:00 AST				Stadium: Prince Mohammed bin Abdullah Al Faisal Stadium

23 January 2024 Friendly	Al-Ahli (Saudi Arabia)	0–1	(Morocco) Raja CA	Dubai
15:00			Zerhouni 76'	Attendance: 0

27 January 2024 Dubai Challenge Cup	Al-Ahli (Saudi Arabia)	3–1	(China) Wuhan	Dubai
18:00				Stadium: Al-Maktoum Stadium

28 January 2024 Dubai Challenge Cup	Al-Ahli (Saudi Arabia)	0–3	(Egypt) Zamalek	Dubai
18:00				Stadium: Al-Maktoum Stadium

== Competitions ==
=== Overview ===
Competition	Record							
Competition	G	W	D	L	GF	GA	GD	Win %
Pro League	34	19	8	7	67	35	+32	55.88
King Cup	2	1	0	1	4	4	+0	50.00
Total	36	20	8	8	72	39	+33	55.56

Updated to match played 23 May 2024
Source: Competitions

=== Pro League ===
==== League table ====
Pos	Team	Pld	W	D	L	GF	GA	GD	Pts	Qualification or relegation
1	Al-Hilal (C)	34	31	3	0	101	23	+78	96	Qualification for AFC Champions League Elite league stage
2	Al-Nassr	34	26	4	4	100	42	+58	82	Qualification for AFC Champions League Elite league stage
3	Al-Ahli	34	19	8	7	67	35	+32	65	Qualification for AFC Champions League Elite league stage
4	Al-Taawoun	34	16	11	7	51	35	+16	59	Qualification for AFC Champions League Two group stage
5	Al-Ittihad	34	16	6	12	63	54	+9	54	

Source: SPL
Rules for classification: 1) Points; 2) Head-to-head points; 3) Head-to-head goal difference; 4) Total goal difference; 5) Total goals scored; 6) Fair-play points
(Note: Head-to-head record is used only after all the matches between the teams in question have been played).
(C) Champions

==== Results summary ====
Overall								Home						Away					
Pld	W	D	L	GF	GA	GD	Pts	W	D	L	GF	GA	GD	W	D	L	GF	GA	GD
34	19	8	7	67	35	+32	65	11	4	2	29	10	+19	8	4	5	38	25	+13

Last updated: 23 May 2024.
Source: spl.com.sa

==== Results by round ====
Round	1	2	3	4	5	6	7	8	9	10	11	12	13	14	15	16	17	18	19	20	21	22	23	24	25	26	27	28	29	30	31	32	33	34
Ground	H	A	H	H	A	H	A	H	A	H	A	H	A	H	A	H	A	A	H	A	A	H	A	H	A	H	A	H	A	H	A	H	A	H
Result	W	W	W	W	L	W	L	D	W	W	L	W	D	D	W	D	W	W	W	L	W	D	W	L	D	W	D	L	L	W	W	W	D	W
Position	4	2	2	2	4	3	6	6	5	4	5	4	3	3	3	3	3	3	3	3	3	3	3	3	3	3	3	3	3	3	3	3	3	3

Updated to match(es) played on 18 May 2024. Source:
A = Away; H = Home; W = Win; D = Draw; L = Loss

==== Matches ====
All times are local, AST (UTC+3).

Win Draw Loss Postponed

11 August 2023 1	Al-Ahli	3–1	Al-Hazem	Jeddah
21:00	Firmino 6', 10', 72'; Hindi (yellow card) 87'	Report	Al-Shammari (yellow card) 13'; Al Mohaimed (yellow card) 20'; Vina 50'	Stadium: Prince Abdullah Al Faisal Stadium; Attendance: 24,006; Referee: Khaled Al-Teris

17 August 2023 2	Al-Khaleej	1–3	Al-Ahli	Dammam
21:00	Jung Woo-young (yellow card) 6'; Rodrigues (yellow card) 53'; Hamzi 58'	Report	Ibañez 9', (yellow card) 70'; Mahrez 45+1'; Al-Majhad (yellow card) 72'; Al-Ali (yellow card) 90+6'; Al-Nabit 90+11'	Stadium: Prince Mohamed bin Fahd Stadium; Attendance: 14,550; Referee: Majed Al-Shamrani

24 August 2023 3	Al-Ahli	1–0	Al-Okhdood	Jeddah
21:00	Kessié 90+6'	Report	Al-Muwallad (yellow card) 35'; Al-Zabdani (yellow card) 54'	Stadium: Prince Abdullah Al Faisal Stadium; Attendance: 23,100; Referee: Mohammed Al-Hoaish

29 August 2023 4	Al-Ahli	2–0	Al-Tai	Jeddah
21:00	Mahrez 39'; Kessié 59'; Al-Asmari (yellow card) 90+2'; Demiral (yellow card) 90+6'	Report	Semedo (red card) 35'; Abdullah (yellow card) 43'; Braga (yellow card) 60'	Stadium: Prince Abdullah Al Faisal Stadium; Attendance: 21,530; Referee: Fedayi San (Switzerland)

2 September 2023 5	Al-Fateh	5–1	Al-Ahli	Al-Hasa
21:00	Al-Buraikan 21' (pen.); Al-Fuhaid (yellow card) 45+1'; Petros (yellow card) 45+10'; Zelarayán 58'; Batna 89' (pen.), 90+3', (yellow card) 90+2'; Bendebka 90+14' (pen.)	Report	Al-Hassan 6' (o.g.); Mahrez (yellow card) 45+9'; Demiral (yellow card) 82' (yellow-red card) 90+12'; Ibañez (yellow card) 87'	Stadium: Prince Abdullah bin Jalawi Stadium; Attendance: 11,715; Referee: Fábio Veríssimo (Portugal)

16 September 2023 6	Al-Ahli	3–2	Al-Taawoun	Jeddah
21:00	Hindi 4', (yellow card) 87' (yellow-red card) 90+4'; Al-Ahmed 23' (o.g.); Majrashi (yellow card) 45+1'; Ibañez (yellow card) 60'; Saint-Maximin 67'; Al-Hurayji (yellow card) 90+10'	Report	Pedro 45+3'; Barrow 51'; Flávio (yellow card) 66'; Medrán (red card) 90+4'	Stadium: Prince Abdullah Al Faisal Stadium; Attendance: 16,175; Referee: Andrés Matonte (Uruguay)

22 September 2023 7	Al-Nassr	4–3	Al-Ahli	Riyadh
21:00	Ronaldo 4', 52'; Talisca 17', 45+6', (yellow card) 90+6'; Mané (yellow card) 34'	Report	Kessié 30'; Mahrez 50' (pen.); Al-Buraikan 87'; Balobaid (yellow card) 90+3'	Stadium: Al-Awwal Park; Attendance: 23,524; Referee: Anderson Daronco (Brazil)

30 September 2023 8	Al-Ahli	0–0	Al-Ettifaq	Jeddah
21:00	Al-Majhad (yellow card) 41'	Report	Al-Khateeb (yellow card) 28'	Stadium: Prince Abdullah Al Faisal Stadium; Attendance: 14,045; Referee: Irfan Peljto (Bosnia and Herzegovina)

6 October 2023 9	Al-Ittihad	0–1	Al-Ahli	Jeddah
21:00	Fabinho (yellow card) 35'; Coronado (yellow card) 75'	Report	Kessié 31'; Mendy (yellow card) 61'; Mahrez (yellow card) 70'; Veiga (yellow card) 86'; Al-Johani (yellow card) 90+3'	Stadium: King Abdullah Sports City; Attendance: 55,764; Referee: Danny Makkelie (Netherlands)

21 October 2023 10	Al-Ahli	3–1	Al-Wehda	Jeddah
21:00	Saint-Maximin 45+3'; Hindi (yellow card) 47'; Ibañez 68'; Mahrez 84'	Report	Ighalo (yellow card) 8'; Duarte (yellow card) 35'; Hindi 51' (o.g.); Al Hejji (red card) 90+1'; Noor (yellow card) 90+6'	Stadium: Prince Abdullah Al Faisal Stadium; Attendance: 16,919; Referee: Jesús Valenzuela (Venezuela)

27 October 2023 11	Al-Hilal	3–1	Al-Ahli	Riyadh
21:00	Milinković-Savić 1'; Mitrović 37'; Ibañez 84' (o.g.)	Report	Ibañez (yellow card) 32'; Hindi (yellow card) 45+4'; Saint-Maximin 58'; Al-Asmari (yellow card) 88'; Kessié (yellow card) 90+1'	Stadium: King Fahd International Stadium; Attendance: 50,986; Referee: Yael Falcón Pérez (Argentina)

5 November 2023 12	Al-Ahli	3–0	Al-Riyadh	Jeddah
21:00	Al-Buraikan 2'; Veiga 26'; Mahrez 52'	Report		Stadium: Prince Abdullah Al Faisal Stadium; Attendance: 10,094; Referee: Ramon Abatti (Brazil)

9 November 2023 13	Damac	2–2	Al-Ahli	Abha
21:00	Chafaï 73'; Stanciu 90+1'	Report	Hindi 10', (yellow card) 90+6'; Kessié (yellow card) 38'; Al-Nabit 44'; Ibañez (yellow card) 90+7'	Stadium: Prince Sultan bin Abdul Aziz Stadium; Attendance: 13,874; Referee: Leandro Rey Hilfer (Argentina)

25 November 2023 14	Al-Ahli	0–0	Al-Shabab	Jeddah
21:00	Al-Hurayji (yellow card) 29'; Veiga (yellow card) 90+4'; Hindi (yellow card) 90+5'	Report	Saïss (yellow card) 47'; Santos (yellow card) 76'; Al-Sqoor (yellow card) 90+5'	Stadium: Prince Abdullah Al Faisal Stadium; Attendance: 17,456; Referee: Mario Escobar (Guatemala)

30 November 2023 15	Abha	0–6	Al-Ahli	Abha
18:00	Sami (yellow card) 73'; Bguir (yellow card) 80'	Report	Veiga 20', 45'; Al-Buraikan 22', 28'; Hindi (yellow card) 37'; Kessié 38'; Ibañez (yellow card) 49'; Mahrez 64'	Stadium: Prince Sultan bin Abdul Aziz Stadium; Attendance: 10,941; Referee: Sergei Karasev (Russia)

9 December 2023 16	Al-Ahli	0–0	Al-Raed	Taif
18:00	Hamidou (yellow card) 3'; Al-Majhad (yellow card) 90+5'	Report	Sayoud (yellow card) 90+14'; Moreira (yellow card) 90+14'; Fouzair (yellow card) 90+15'	Stadium: King Fahd Sports City; Attendance: 11,332; Referee: Kirill Levnikov (Russia)

14 December 2023 17	Al-Fayha	0–4	Al-Ahli	Riyadh
21:00	Al-Safri (yellow card) 65'; Sakala (yellow card) 87'	Report	Al-Buraikan 11', 30'; Majrashi 17'; Mahrez 43' (pen.)	Stadium: Prince Faisal bin Fahd Stadium; Attendance: 5,932; Referee: Guillermo Enrique Guerrero (Ecuador)

22 December 2023 18	Al-Hazem	0–4	Al-Ahli	Buraidah
18:00	Badamosi (yellow card) 22'; Qasheesh (yellow card) 38'; Al-Aazmi (yellow card) 89'	Report	Hamidou (yellow card) 40'; Mahrez 45+1'; Veiga 58'; Ibañez (yellow card) 66'; Al-Buraikan 81'; Demiral 90+1'	Stadium: King Abdullah Sport City Stadium; Attendance: 1,798; Referee: Juan Gabriel Benítez (Paraguay)

29 December 2023 19	Al-Ahli	1–0	Al-Khaleej	Jeddah
21:00	Veiga (yellow card) 36'; Kessié 90+9' (pen.); Mendy (yellow card) 90+12'	Report	Hawsawi (yellow card) 56'; Al-Samiri (yellow card) 90+3'; Rodrigues (yellow card) 90+8'; Al-Khabrani (yellow card) 90+8'	Stadium: Prince Abdullah Al Faisal Stadium; Attendance: 20,786; Referee: István Kovács (Romania)

16 February 2024 20	Al-Okhdood	3–2	Al-Ahli	Najran
20:00	Collado 25'; Al Mansour 43'; Tawamba 59'; Godwin (yellow card) 82'; Al-Muwallad (yellow card) 89'	Report	Kvirkvelia 32' (o.g.); Firmino 45+3' (pen.); Ibañez (yellow card) 86' (yellow-red card) 90+5'	Stadium: Prince Hathloul bin Abdul Aziz Sports City; Attendance: 4,391; Referee: Kirill Levnikov (Russia)

24 February 2024 21	Al-Tai	1–4	Al-Ahli	Ha'il
17:00	Roco (yellow card) 18'; Mensah 43', (yellow card) 70'; Al-Moasher (yellow card) 45+2'; Braga (yellow card) 45+8'; Al-Nakhli (yellow card) 51'	Report	Firmino 45+8', 60'; Al-Majhad (yellow card) 53'; Mahrez 82'; Kessié 88'	Stadium: Prince Abdul Aziz bin Musa'ed Stadium; Attendance: 7,079; Referee: Mohammed Al-Hakim (Sweden)

2 March 2024 22	Al-Ahli	1–1	Al-Fateh	Jeddah
20:00	Ibañez (yellow card) 10' (yellow-red card) 14'; Kessié (yellow card) 63'; Saint-Maximin 75'	Report	Al-Najdi (yellow card) 27'; Baattia (yellow card) 41' (yellow-red card) 89'; Tello 45+8'; Lajami (yellow card) 90+9'	Stadium: King Abdullah Sports City; Attendance: 44,137; Referee: Majed Al-Shamrani

9 March 2024 23	Al-Taawoun	0–1	Al-Ahli	Buraidah
20:00	Girotto (yellow card) 21'; Aboulshamat (yellow card) 90+3'	Report	Al-Buraikan 82'	Stadium: King Abdullah Sport City Stadium; Attendance: 14,179; Referee: Sami Al-Jires

15 March 2024 24	Al-Ahli	0–1	Al-Nassr	Jeddah
22:00	Ibañez (yellow card) 12'; Kessié (yellow card) 45+4'	Report	Otávio (yellow card) 53'; Ronaldo 68' (pen.); Laporte (yellow card) 90+10'	Stadium: King Abdullah Sports City; Attendance: 52,037; Referee: Facundo Tello (Argentine)

29 March 2024 25	Al-Ettifaq	2–2	Al-Ahli	Dammam
22:00	Fofana 45+3'; Al-Buraikan 49' (o.g.); Dembélé (yellow card) 60'; Al-Ghannam (yellow card) 68'; Al-Khateeb (yellow card) 88'	Report	Al-Buraikan 8'; Al-Asmari (yellow card) 30'; Al-Ammar 88'; Al-Nabit (yellow card) 88'	Stadium: Al-Ettifaq Club Stadium; Attendance: 11,454; Referee: Faisal Al-Blwi

1 April 2024 26	Al-Ahli	1–0	Al-Ittihad	Jeddah
22:00	Al-Asmari (yellow card) 6'; Al-Buraikan 34'; Majrashi (yellow card) 79'	Report	Al-Amri (yellow card) 79'; Al-Sqoor (yellow card) 90'	Stadium: King Abdullah Sports City; Attendance: 50,633; Referee: Rade Obrenović (Slovenia)

5 April 2024 27	Al-Wehda	1–1	Al-Ahli	Jeddah
22:00	Ighalo (yellow card) 37'; Bakshween (yellow card) 46'; Noor 48'; El Yamiq (yellow card) 82'; Goodwin (yellow card) 90'	Report	Al-Nabit (yellow card) 66'; Hindi (red card) 79'; Ibañez 83'; Mendy (yellow card) 90'	Stadium: Prince Abdullah Al Faisal Stadium; Attendance: 7,647; Referee: Mohammed Al-Hoaish

25 April 2024 29	Al-Riyadh	2–1	Al-Ahli	Riyadh
21:00	Touré 43' (pen.); Al-Nowaiqi (yellow card) 47'; Al-Harajin 84'; Ndong (yellow card) 89'; Assiri (yellow card) 90+6'	Report	Demiral (yellow card) 40'; Kessié 45+10'; Ibañez (yellow card) 51'	Stadium: Prince Faisal bin Fahd Stadium; Attendance: 5,813; Referee: Sami Al-Jires

2 May 2024 30	Al-Ahli	4–1	Damac	Jeddah
21:00	Al-Johani 7'; Al-Buraikan 10'; Mahrez 19' (pen.); Firmino 25'	Report	Al-Johani (yellow card) 44'; Antolić 62'; Chafaï (yellow card) 70', (red card) 77'; Makin (yellow card) 90+1'	Stadium: Prince Abdullah Al Faisal Stadium; Attendance: 10,762; Referee: Abdullah Al-Awedan

6 May 2024 28	Al-Ahli	1–2	Al-Hilal	Jeddah
21:00	Al-Buraikan 30'; Kessié (yellow card) 70'; Demiral (yellow card) 70'; Balobaid (yellow card) 83'	Report	Al-Tambakti (yellow card) 50'; Mitrović 52'; Malcom 89'	Stadium: King Abdullah Sports City; Attendance: 49,816; Referee: Ricardo de Burgos Bengoetxea (Spain)

11 May 2024 31	Al-Shabab	1–2	Al-Ahli	Riyadh
21:00	Carrasco 19'; Saïss (yellow card) 50'	Report	Kessié 45+10', (yellow card) 85'; Ibañez (yellow card) 47'; Firmino 53'; Al-Majhad (yellow card) 90+1'; Al-Rashidi (yellow card) 90+7'	Stadium: Al-Shabab Club Stadium; Attendance: 13,475; Referee: Sergei Karasev (Russia)

18 May 2024 32	Al-Ahli	5–1	Abha	Jeddah
21:00	Al-Buraikan 8'; Al-Johani 45+1'; Ibañez (yellow card) 47'; Al-Nabit 72'; Mahrez 85'; Kessié 87'	Report	Al-Ali (yellow card) 13'; Kamano (yellow card) 49'; Mendy 90+1' (o.g.)	Stadium: King Abdullah Sports City; Attendance: 22,965; Referee: Tamás Bognár (Hungary)

23 May 2024 33	Al-Raed	0–0	Al-Ahli	Buraidah
21:00	Al-Fahad (yellow card) 63'; Al-Subaie (yellow card) 80'	Report		Stadium: King Abdullah Sports City Stadium; Attendance: 11,563; Referee: Rade Obrenović (Slovenia)

27 May 2024 34	Al-Ahli	1–0	Al-Fayha	Jeddah
21:00	Firmino 85'; Al-Nabit (yellow card) 90+2'; Kessié (yellow card) 90+2'	Report	Haqawi (yellow card) 15'; Al-Enezi (yellow card) 81'	Stadium: Prince Abdullah Al Faisal Stadium; Attendance: 8,489; Referee: Radu Petrescu

=== King Cup ===
All times are local, AST (UTC+3).

26 September 2023 Round of 32	Al-Ain	2–3	Al-Ahli	Al Bahah
18:00	Al-Hulayel (yellow card) 15'; Dagarshawi (yellow card) 51'; Dodô 82', 90+7'	Report	Al-Buraikan 23', 29'; Al-Nabit 39'	Stadium: King Saud Sport City Stadium; Attendance: 1,943; Referee: Kevin Ortega (Peru)

31 October 2023 Round of 16	Al-Ahli	1–2	Abha	Jeddah
21:00	Mahrez 45+8' (pen.)	Report	Abdu 45+2'; Al-Qumayzi (yellow card) 45+5'; Al-Habib (yellow card) 45+5'; Sami (red card) 52'; Toko Ekambi 67'; François Kamano (yellow card) 73' (yellow-red card) 90+3'	Stadium: Prince Abdullah Al Faisal Stadium; Attendance: 13,635; Referee: Paulo Cesar Zanovelli (Brazil)

== Statistics ==
=== Appearances ===
Last updated on 27 May 2024.

No.	Pos	Nat	Player	Total		Pro League		King Cup	
No.	Pos	Nat	Player	Apps	Goals	Apps	Goals	Apps	Goals
Goalkeepers
1	GK	(Saudi Arabia) KSA	Abdulrahman Al-Sanbi	1	0	1	0	0	0
16	GK	(Senegal) SEN	Édouard Mendy	35	0	33	0	2	0
62	GK	(Saudi Arabia) KSA	Abdullah Abdoh	0	0	0	0	0	0
Defenders
3	DF	(Brazil) BRA	Roger Ibañez	32	3	30	3	2	0
6	DF	(Saudi Arabia) KSA	Bassam Al-Hurayji	18	0	10+6	0	2	0
11	DF	(North Macedonia) MKD	Ezgjan Alioski	4	0	4	0	0	0
15	DF	(Saudi Arabia) KSA	Abdullah Al-Ammar	19	1	13+5	1	1	0
26	DF	(Saudi Arabia) KSA	Fahad Al-Hamad	4	0	1+3	0	0	0
27	DF	(Saudi Arabia) KSA	Ali Majrashi	22	1	18+3	1	0+1	0
28	DF	(Turkey) TUR	Merih Demiral	21	1	17+3	1	1	0
31	DF	(Saudi Arabia) KSA	Saad Balobaid	24	0	15+8	0	1	0
34	DF	(Saudi Arabia) KSA	Bandar Al-Shamrani	0	0	0	0	0	0
37	DF	(Saudi Arabia) KSA	Abdulbasit Hindi	25	2	22+2	2	1	0
46	DF	(Saudi Arabia) KSA	Rayane Hamidou	10	0	7+3	0	0	0
65	DF	(Saudi Arabia) KSA	Faisal Al-Sibyani	0	0	0	0	0	0
Midfielders
8	MF	(Saudi Arabia) KSA	Sumayhan Al-Nabit	28	4	6+21	3	1	1
14	MF	(Saudi Arabia) KSA	Abdullah Otayf	1	0	0+1	0	0	0
18	MF	(Saudi Arabia) KSA	Younes Al-Shanqiti	0	0	0	0	0	0
19	MF	(Saudi Arabia) KSA	Fahad Al-Rashidi	33	0	4+27	0	0+2	0
24	MF	(Spain) ESP	Gabri Veiga	20	4	16+2	4	2	0
29	MF	(Saudi Arabia) KSA	Mohammed Al-Majhad	28	0	20+7	0	1	0
30	MF	(Saudi Arabia) KSA	Ziyad Al-Johani	24	2	10+12	2	0+2	0
40	MF	(Saudi Arabia) KSA	Ali Al-Asmari	15	0	3+10	0	0+2	0
45	MF	(Saudi Arabia) KSA	Abdulkarim Darisi	9	0	0+8	0	0+1	0
79	MF	(Ivory Coast) CIV	Franck Kessié	33	10	31	10	2	0
95	MF	(Saudi Arabia) KSA	Ayman Fallatah	0	0	0	0	0	0
Forwards
7	FW	(Algeria) ALG	Riyad Mahrez	33	12	32	11	1	1
10	FW	(Brazil) BRA	Roberto Firmino	34	9	25+7	9	2	0
17	FW	(Saudi Arabia) KSA	Haitham Asiri	7	0	0+6	0	0+1	0
20	FW	(Saudi Arabia) KSA	Firas Al-Buraikan	29	15	23+4	13	2	2
97	FW	(France) FRA	Allan Saint-Maximin	31	4	30	4	1	0
Players sent out on loan this season
13	DF	(Saudi Arabia) KSA	Ibrahim Al-Zubaidi	2	0	1+1	0	0	0
35	DF	(Saudi Arabia) KSA	Ahmed Al-Nakhli	1	0	0+1	0	0	0
Player who made an appearance this season but have left the club
9	MF	(Algeria) ALG	Ryad Boudebouz	2	0	2	0	0	0
18	FW	(Saudi Arabia) KSA	Abdullah Al-Mogren	1	0	0+1	0	0	0
71	GK	(Saudi Arabia) KSA	Mohammed Al-Rubaie	0	0	0	0	0	0
77	FW	(Saudi Arabia) KSA	Hassan Al-Ali	4	0	0+4	0	0	0

=== Goalscorers ===
Rank	No.	Pos	Nat	Name	Pro League	King Cup	Total
1	20	FW	(Saudi Arabia)	Firas Al-Buraikan	13	2	15
2	7	FW	(Algeria)	Riyad Mahrez	11	1	12
3	79	MF	(Ivory Coast)	Franck Kessié	10	0	10
4	10	FW	(Brazil)	Roberto Firmino	9	0	9
5	8	MF	(Saudi Arabia)	Sumayhan Al-Nabit	3	1	4
5	24	MF	(Spain)	Gabri Veiga	4	0	4
5	97	FW	(France)	Allan Saint-Maximin	4	0	4
8	3	DF	(Brazil)	Roger Ibañez	3	0	3
9	30	MF	(Saudi Arabia)	Ziyad Al-Johani	2	0	2
9	37	DF	(Saudi Arabia)	Abdulbasit Hindi	2	0	2
11	15	DF	(Saudi Arabia)	Abdullah Al-Ammar	1	0	1
11	27	DF	(Saudi Arabia)	Ali Majrashi	1	0	1
11	28	DF	(Turkey)	Merih Demiral	1	0	1
Own goal					3	0	3
Total					67	4	71

Last Updated: 27 May 2024

=== Assists ===
Rank	No.	Pos	Nat	Name	Pro League	King Cup	Total
1	7	FW	(Algeria)	Riyad Mahrez	13	0	13
2	97	FW	(France)	Allan Saint-Maximin	9	0	9
3	10	FW	(Brazil)	Roberto Firmino	6	1	7
3	20	FW	(Saudi Arabia)	Firas Al-Buraikan	7	0	7
5	24	MF	(Spain)	Gabri Veiga	3	1	4
5	79	MF	(Ivory Coast)	Franck Kessié	4	0	4
7	29	MF	(Saudi Arabia)	Mohammed Al-Majhad	2	0	2
8	8	MF	(Saudi Arabia)	Sumayhan Al-Nabit	1	0	1
8	11	DF	(North Macedonia)	Ezgjan Alioski	1	0	1
8	19	MF	(Saudi Arabia)	Fahad Al-Rashidi	1	0	1
8	27	DF	(Saudi Arabia)	Ali Majrashi	1	0	1
8	28	DF	(Turkey)	Merih Demiral	1	0	1
8	31	DF	(Saudi Arabia)	Saad Balobaid	1	0	1
Total					50	2	52

Last Updated: 18 May 2024

=== Clean sheets ===
Rank	No.	Pos	Nat	Name	Pro League	King Cup	Total
1	16	GK	(Senegal)	Édouard Mendy	15	0	15
Total					15	0	15

Last Updated: 27 May 2024
