= Roger Ibañez =

Brazilian footballer (born 1998)

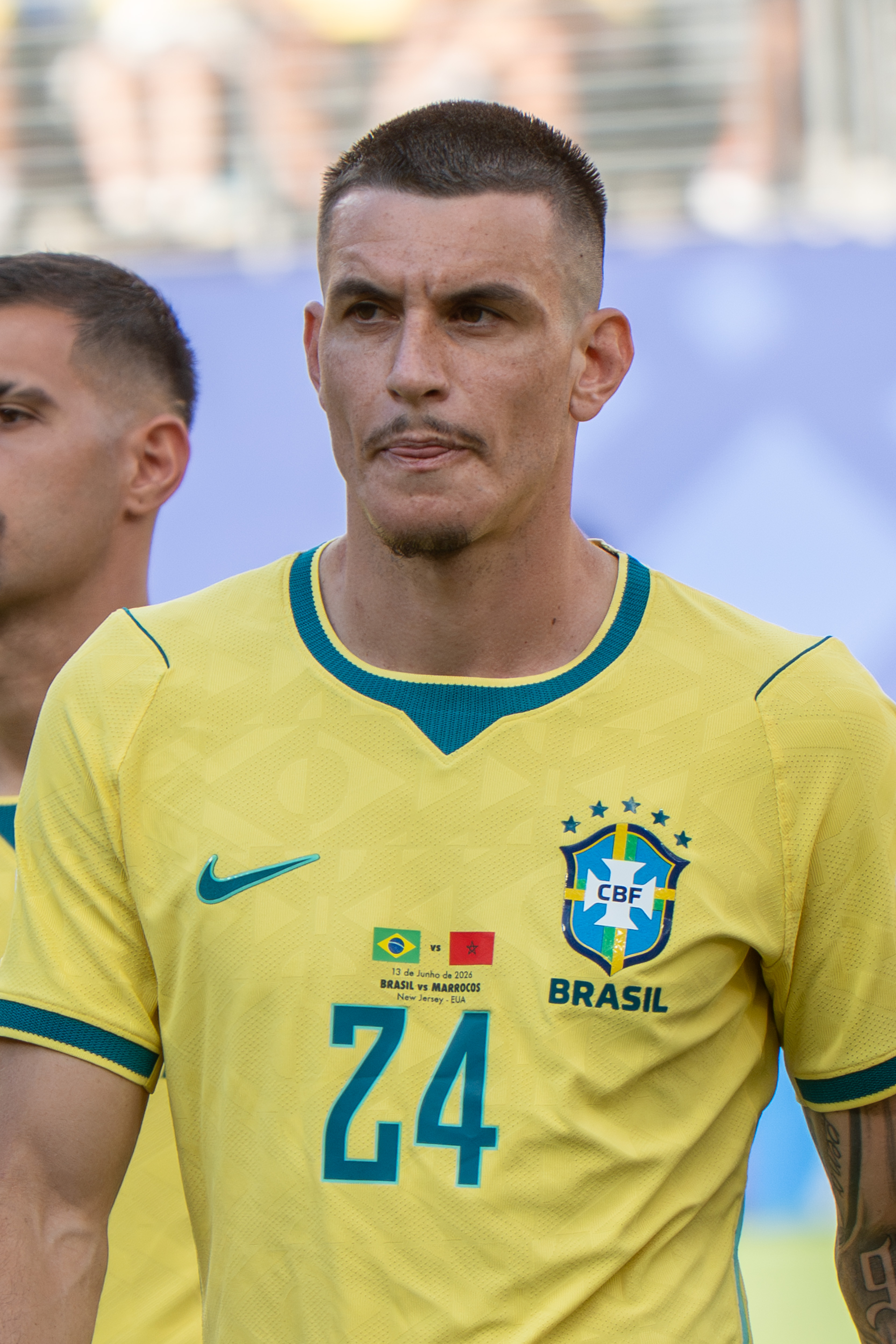
- Ibañez with Brazil in 2026

Personal information
- Full name: Roger Ibañez da Silva
- Date of birth: 23 November 1998 (age 27)
- Place of birth: Canela, Brazil
- Height: 1.86 m (6 ft 1 in)
- Positions: Centre-back; defensive midfielder

Team information
- Current team: Al-Ahli
- Number: 3

Youth career
- 2016: GAO
- 2016–2017: PRS
- 2017: → Fluminense (loan)

Senior career*
Years	Team	Apps	(Gls)
2016–2018	PRS	9	(2)
2017	→ Sergipe (loan)	2	(0)
2017–2018	→ Fluminense (loan)	6	(0)
2018–2019	Fluminense	22	(1)
2019–2021	Atalanta	1	(0)
2020–2021	→ Roma (loan)	39	(0)
2021–2023	Roma	67	(6)
2023–	Al-Ahli	100	(11)

International career^{‡}
2019–2020	Brazil U23	6	(0)
2022–	Brazil	8	(0)
- * Club domestic league appearances and goals as of 20 November 2026 ‡ National team caps and goals as of 13 June 2026

Roger Ibañez da Silva (Portuguese pronunciation: [ʁɔˈʒɛʁ iˈbaɲis dɐ ˈsiwvɐ]; born 23 November 1998) is a Brazilian professional footballer who plays as a centre-back for Saudi Pro League club Al-Ahli and the Brazil national team. Mainly a centre-back, he can also play as a defensive midfielder.

== Club career ==
=== Early career ===
Born in Canela, Rio Grande do Sul to a Uruguayan mother, Ibañez only started his career in 2016, aged 18, at Grêmio Atlético Osoriense. Playing as a midfielder, he joined PRS Futebol Clube later in that year, and made his senior debut during the 2016 Copa Serrana, which was the club's first professional competition.

On 5 December 2016, Ibañez signed for Sergipe on loan for the season. The following 4 March, however, after featuring rarely, he was recalled. Upon returning, he became a regular starter during PRS' Campeonato Gaúcho Série B campaign.

=== Fluminense ===
In the middle of 2017, Ibañez joined Fluminense and was initially assigned to the under-20 squad. Promoted to the first team for the 2018 season by manager Abel Braga, he made his professional debut on 20 January 2018, starting in a 0–0 Campeonato Carioca home draw against Botafogo.

On 28 February 2018, Ibãnez had his federative rights purchased by Flu, and he signed a new five-year deal with the club. He made his Série A debut on 15 April, starting in a 2–1 away loss against Corinthians, and finished the campaign with 14 league appearances.

=== Atalanta ===
On 29 January 2019, Ibañez signed with Italian club Atalanta. Having been inserted in the squad in February, he received his debut on 11 May, coming on for the final few minutes of their 2–1 victory over Genoa. He replaced attacker Josip Iličić as the club was in the heat of battle for a top-four Serie A finish and UEFA Champions League qualification for the first time in their history, which they eventually achieved.

Ibañez made his first appearance the following season on the final day of Atalanta's group stage campaign in the Champions League. Needing a win away to Shakhtar Donetsk, Ibañez came on for centre-forward Luis Muriel for the final 20 minutes with Atalanta leading 1–0 and having previously abandoned their regular back three for a back four while in search of the winning goal. Ibañez had only been included in one of the previous five match day squads, but the suspension of Rafael Toloi and an injury to Simon Kjær paved the way for his inclusion. Atalanta would win the game 0–3, qualifying for the knockout stage.

=== Roma ===
On 27 January 2020, Ibañez moved to fellow Serie A club Roma and signed a four-and-a-half-year contract with the club. The transfer was initially a loan until 30 June 2021, set to convert to a permanent transfer for a predetermined fee of €8 million if certain conditions were met. On 4 March 2021, he signed a new long-term deal with Roma until 30 June 2025.

=== Al-Ahli ===
On 10 August 2023, Roger Ibañez joined Saudi club Al-Ahli on a permanent transfer, for a reported fee of €30m including bonuses. On 18 August, he scored his first goal for the club in a 3–1 away victory against Khaleej Club.

== International career ==
On 9 September 2022, Ibañez received his first call up to the Brazil national team, for friendlies against Ghana and Tunisia. He made his debut against Tunisia on 27 September, in a 5–1 win.

On 18 May 2026, Ibañez was selected for Brazil's squad for the 2026 FIFA World Cup.

== Personal life ==
Ibanez is married to Bruna Kisner. The couple has two kids: Antonella and Ravi.

== Career statistics ==
=== Club ===
As of match played 19 October 2026

Appearances and goals by club, season and competition
Club	Season	League			State league (Note: Includes Campeonato Sergipano, Campeonato Carioca)		National cup (Note: Includes Copa do Brasil, Coppa Italia, King's Cup)		Continental		Other		Total	
Club	Season	Division	Apps	Goals	Apps	Goals	Apps	Goals	Apps	Goals	Apps	Goals	Apps	Goals
PRS	2016	—N/a	—		—		—		—		11 (Note: Appearances in Copa Serrana)	0	11	0
PRS	2017	Gaúcho Série B	—		9	2	—		—		—		9	2
PRS	Total		—		9	2	—		—		11	0	20	2
Sergipe (loan)	2017	Série D	0	0	2	0	0	0	—		0	0	2	0
Fluminense (loan)	2017	Série A	0	0	—		0	0	—		—		0	0
Fluminense	2018	Série A	14	0	12	0	4	1	7 (Note: Appearances in Copa Sudamericana)	0	—		37	1
Fluminense	2019	Série A	0	0	2	1	0	0	0	0	—		2	1
Fluminense	Total		14	0	14	1	4	1	7	0	—		39	2
Atalanta	2018–19	Serie A	1	0	—		0	0	—		—		1	0
Atalanta	2019–20	Serie A	0	0	—		0	0	1 (Note: Appearance in UEFA Champions League)	0	—		1	0
Atalanta	Total		1	0	—		0	0	1	0	—		2	0
Roma (loan)	2019–20	Serie A	9	0	—		0	0	1 (Note: Appearance(s) in UEFA Europa League)	0	—		10	0
Roma (loan)	2020–21	Serie A	30	0	—		1	0	9	2	—		40	2
Roma	2021–22	Serie A	34	3	—		2	0	15 (Note: Appearances in UEFA Europa Conference League)	1	—		51	4
Roma	2022–23	Serie A	33	3	—		2	0	13	0	—		48	3
Roma	Roma total		106	6	—		5	0	38	3	—		149	9
Al-Ahli	2023–24	Saudi Pro League	30	3	—		2	0	—		—		32	3
Al-Ahli	2024–25	Saudi Pro League	31	5	—		1	0	13 (Note: Appearances in AFC Champions League Elite)	2	1 (Note: Appearance in Saudi Super Cup)	0	46	7
Al-Ahli	2025–26	Saudi Pro League	28	2	—		4	0	11	1	3 (Note: Two appearances and one goal in Saudi Super Cup, one appearance in FIFA Intercontinental Cup)	1	46	4
Al-Ahli	2026–27	Saudi Pro League	8	0	—		1	0	1	1	2 (Note: Appearances in FIFA Intercontinental Cup)	0	12	1
Al-Ahli	Total		97	10	—		8	0	25	4	6	1	136	15
Career total			218	16	25	3	17	1	71	7	17	1	348	28

=== International ===
As of match played 13 June 2026

Appearances and goals by national team and year
National team	Year	Apps	Goals
Brazil	2022	1	0
Brazil	2023	2	0
Brazil	2026	5	0
Total		8	0

== Honours ==
Roma

- UEFA Europa Conference League: 2021–22
- UEFA Europa League runner-up: 2022–23

Al-Ahli

- AFC Champions League Elite: 2024–25, 2025–26
- Saudi Super Cup: 2025

Individual

- Saudi Pro League Player of the Month: April 2025
