= Merih Demiral =

Turkish footballer (born 1998)

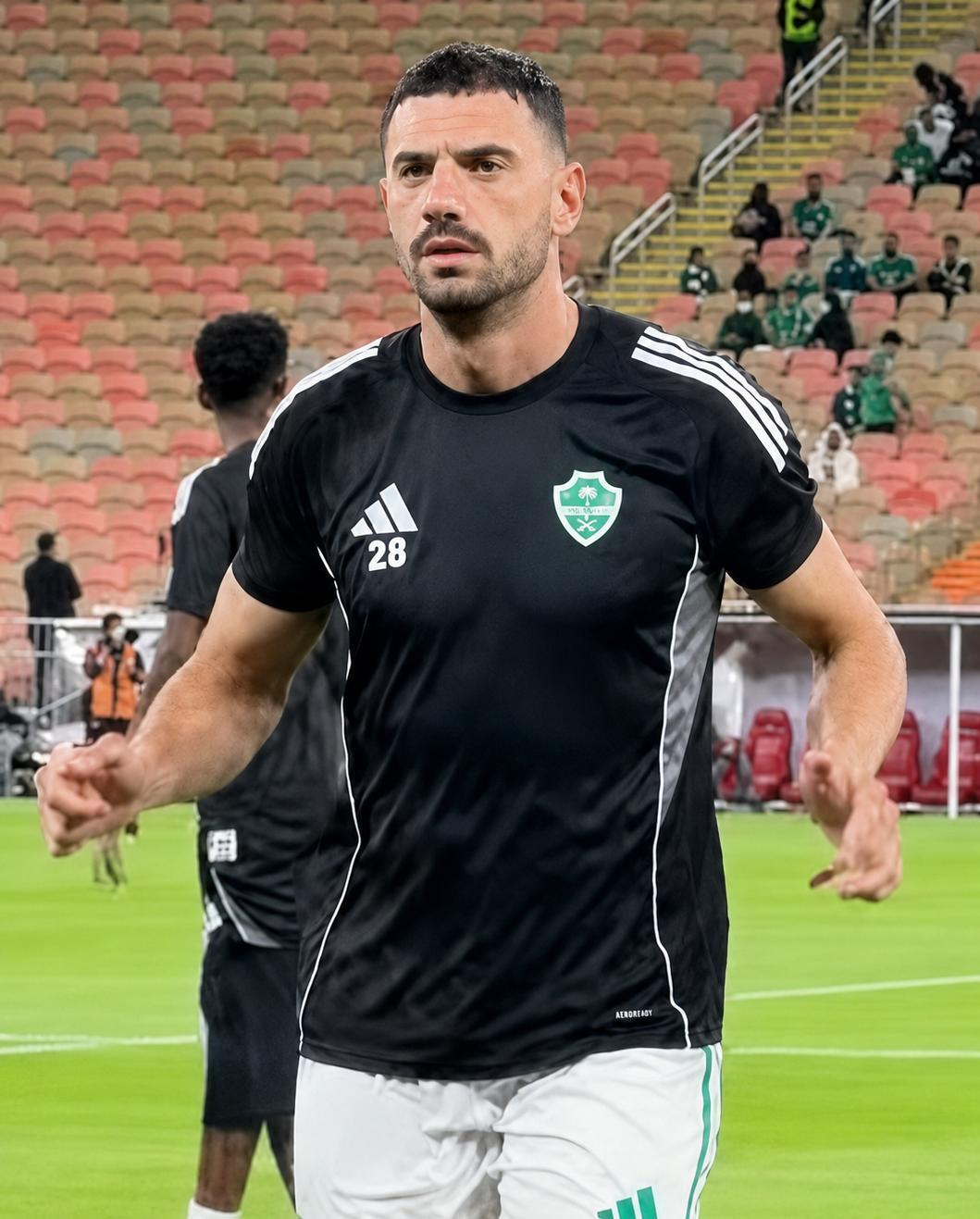
- Demiral with Al-Ahli in 2026

Personal information
- Full name: Merih Demiral
- Date of birth: 5 March 1998 (age 28)
- Place of birth: Karamürsel, Turkey
- Height: 1.90 m (6 ft 3 in)
- Position: Centre-back

Team information
- Current team: Al-Ahli
- Number: 28

Youth career
- 2009–2011: Karamürsel Idmanyurduspor
- 2011–2016: Fenerbahçe

Senior career*
Years	Team	Apps	(Gls)
2016–2017	Alcanenense	12	(0)
2017	→ Sporting CP B (loan)	3	(0)
2017–2019	Sporting CP B	26	(0)
2018–2019	→ Alanyaspor (loan)	16	(1)
2019	→ Sassuolo (loan)	14	(2)
2019–2022	Juventus	21	(1)
2021–2022	→ Atalanta (loan)	28	(1)
2022–2023	Atalanta	28	(1)
2023–	Al-Ahli	79	(4)

International career^{‡}
2014–2015	Turkey U17	7	(1)
2015	Turkey U18	2	(0)
2015–2016	Turkey U19	10	(1)
2018	Turkey U20	9	(0)
2016–2018	Turkey U21	13	(0)
2018–	Turkey	70	(6)
- * Club domestic league appearances and goals as of 20:41, 20 November 2026 (UTC) ‡ National team caps and goals as of 15 November 2026

Merih Demiral (born 5 March 1998) is a Turkish professional footballer who plays as a centre-back for Saudi Pro League club Al-Ahli and the Turkey national team.

== Club career ==
=== Early years ===
Product of the Fenerbahçe youth system, Demiral was signed by Portuguese side Alcanenense in 2016. On 16 October 2016, he made his Taça de Portugal debut against Feirense in a 2-1 home loss.

=== Sporting ===
In January 2017, he was loaned out to Sporting B, and made his professional debut in the Segunda Liga for the latter club on 5 February 2017 in a 1–1 home draw against Famalicão. At the end of the season, he was signed outright by the club.

On 12 July 2017, he made his first and only performance with Sporting in a 2-4 Taça de Portugal third round away win against Oleiros as a late substitute.

==== Loan to Alanyaspor ====
On 15 August 2018, he joined Turkish club Alanyaspor on loan. On 29 January 2019, he permanently joined Alanyaspor for €3.5 million.

=== Sassuolo ===
On 30 January 2019, Demiral joined Italian club Sassuolo on loan with an obligation to buy. He made his Serie A and club debut on 24 February, in a 1–1 home draw against SPAL, and scored his first goals both for the club and in Serie A—a brace in a 4–0 home win over Chievo—on 4 April.

=== Juventus ===
On 5 July 2019, Juventus officially announced the transfer of Demiral from Sassuolo, on a five-year contract for €18 million. His salary was reportedly unfolded as €1.3 million per year. He became the first Turkish player to play for the club. He made his club debut on 21 September, in a 2–1 home win over Verona in Serie A. He subsequently made his Champions League debut on 11 December, in the club's final group match, earning praise in the media for his performance as he helped Juventus keep a clean sheet in a 2–0 away win over Bayer Leverkusen.

He scored his first goal for the club on 12 January 2020, the opener in a 2–1 away win over Roma, which saw Juventus secure the unofficial title of "Winter Champions", though he was later substituted for Matthijs de Ligt after sustaining an anterior cruciate ligament injury. As a result, he was expected to be ruled out for the remainder of the season, including Euro 2020. He returned to action on 1 August, featuring as a substitute in Juventus' 3–1 home defeat to Roma in Serie A, with Juventus already confirmed as league champions.

==== Loan to Atalanta ====
On 6 August 2021, Atalanta announced the signing of Demiral from Juventus on loan with an option to buy. During the 2021–22 season, he accumulated a total of 42 appearances in all competitions, scored two goals, and provided three assists. Atalanta exercised the right to buy on 17 June 2022 for a fee of €20 million.

=== Al-Ahli ===
On 19 August 2023, Demiral joined Saudi Pro League club Al-Ahli on a three-year contract for a reported fee of €17 million.

On 24 August 2023, he made his debut with the team against Al-Okhdood in a 1-0 Saudi Pro League win. On 22 December 2023, he scored his first goal with the team and also made his first assist against Al-Fayha in a 0-4 Saudi Pro League away match win.

On 16 September 2024, he made his AFC Champions League Elite debut against Persepolis in a 1-0 home win. He played all 2024–25 AFC Champions League Elite matches and helped the team to win the trophy with his performance.

== International career ==
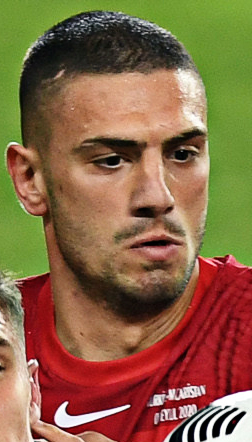
Demiral with Turkey in 2020

Demiral represented Turkey at junior levels, including Under-17 and Under-19. He made his debut for the senior squad on 20 November 2018 in a friendly against Ukraine, as an 85th-minute substitute for Mert Müldür. On 11 June 2021, Demiral scored an own goal in a 3–0 defeat against Italy in the first game of the UEFA Euro 2020 campaign; it was the first time in the tournament's history that the match opener kicked off with an own goal.

On 7 June 2024, he was selected in the 26-man squad for the UEFA Euro 2024. In the round of 16 match against Austria, he was awarded player of the match by scoring a brace in a 2–1 victory, securing his country's qualification to the quarter-finals. His first goal, netted just 57 seconds into the game, set a record as the fastest goal in the knockout stages of the European competition.

On 14 October 2025, he scored twice in a 2026 FIFA World Cup qualification match against Georgia in Kocaeli Stadium, in Kocaeli where he was born.

On 2 June 2026, Demiral was selected in the 26-man squad for the 2026 FIFA World Cup.

=== Military salute during the Euro 2020 qualifier ===
On 11 October 2019, following Cenk Tosun's goal in a 1–0 home win over Albania in a Euro 2020 qualifier, Demiral was one of the Turkish players who participated in a controversial "military salute" goal celebration. The same day, he stated his open support for the Turkish offensive into north-eastern Syria on Twitter; while his post was praised by Turkish supporters, it also drew criticism from numerous football fans of Juventus on social media, as well as those of other clubs, some of whom asked for the club to take disciplinary actions against the player; others even demanded that Demiral be dismissed by the club.

=== Euro 2024 ban and wolf salute ===
On 2 July 2024, after the match against Austria in the Euro 2024 in Germany, Demiral displayed the so-called wolf salute, which is associated with Turkish nationalism, pan-Turkism, and the Grey Wolves organization. The salute is banned in Austria. At the press conference, he stated that it was an expression of Turkish pride and he intends to do it again when the opportunity arises. In addition to criticism from politicians and journalists, UEFA started an investigation for alleged inappropriate behaviour. On 3 and 4 July 2024 Turkey and Germany respectively summoned the other nations ambassador to discuss the incident. UEFA announced on 5 July that he would be banned for a total of two matches for failing to comply with the general principles of conduct and for violating the basic rules of decent conduct. The Turkish Football Federation (TFF) said they would appeal the decision to the Court of Arbitration for Sport (CAS). TFF president Mehmet Büyükeksi later that day acknowledged that, according to article 63 of UEFA statutes, the CAS has no authority over cases were a player has been banned for less than three matches and there is no way for the TFF to appeal his ban. UEFA's ban on Demiral was criticised by some as hypocritical and of double standard by drawing comparisons with the lighter penalty received by Jude Bellingham for offensive gesture made at the same tournament and with political gestures made by footballers of other nations which had gone unpunished in previous editions of the tournament.

== Style of play ==
Demiral is usually deployed as a centre-back, in either a three or four-man defence, although he is a versatile player, who is also capable of playing as a right-sided full-back.

An aggressive and instinctive defender, his main traits are his physicality, tactical intelligence, tackling, composure, and determination, which allow to excel at reading plays, and also enable him to anticipate or mark his opponents well. A tall and physically strong defender, he is also known for his ability in the air, which enables him to defend opposing crosses and clear the ball away from his own penalty area. Despite his tall stature and imposing physique, he is also a mobile defender, which allows him to make recoveries, win back the ball effectively, or restrict his opponents' movements when defending off the ball.

Regarded as a promising young defender in the media, due to his characteristics, he has been compared to Nemanja Vidić, whom Demiral himself has also cited as an inspiration. Another one of his influences is his Juventus teammate Giorgio Chiellini, to whom he has also been compared. He has also been likened to former Juventus defender Paolo Montero.

== Personal life ==
Merih Demiral married the Albanian model Heidi Lushtaku in 2021.

On 20 April 2022, Demiral and his wife became the parents of a son and made this public a month after the birth.

== Career statistics ==
=== Club ===
As of match played 19 October 2026

Appearances and goals by club, season and competition
Club	Season	League			National cup (Note: Includes Taça de Portugal, Turkish Cup, Coppa Italia, King's Cup)		Continental		Other		Total	
Club	Season	Division	Apps	Goals	Apps	Goals	Apps	Goals	Apps	Goals	Apps	Goals
Alcanenense	2016–17	Campeonato de Portugal	12	0	1	0	—		—		13	0
Sporting CP B (loan)	2016–17	LigaPro	3	0	—		—		—		3	0
Sporting CP B	2017–18	LigaPro	26	0	0	0	—		—		26	0
Sporting CP	2017–18	Primeira Liga	—		1	0	—		—		1	0
Alanyaspor (loan)	2018–19	Süper Lig	16	1	4	0	—		—		20	1
Sassuolo (loan)	2018–19	Serie A	14	2	—		—		—		14	2
Juventus	2019–20	Serie A	6	1	0	0	1 (Note: Appearance(s) in UEFA Champions League)	0	1 (Note: Appearance in Supercoppa Italiana)	0	8	1
Juventus	2020–21	Serie A	15	0	4	0	5	0	0	0	24	0
Juventus	Total		21	1	4	0	6	0	1	0	32	1
Atalanta (loan)	2021–22	Serie A	28	1	2	0	12 (Note: Six appearances and one goal in UEFA Champions League, six appearances in UEFA Europa League)	1	—		42	2
Atalanta	2022–23	Serie A	28	1	0	0	—		—		28	1
Al-Ahli	2023–24	Saudi Pro League	20	1	1	0	—		—		21	1
Al-Ahli	2024–25	Saudi Pro League	30	1	1	0	12 (Note: Appearances in AFC Champions League Elite)	0	1 (Note: Appearance in Saudi Super Cup)	0	44	1
Al-Ahli	2025–26	Saudi Pro League	20	2	3	0	6	0	3 (Note: Two appearances in Saudi Super Cup, one appearance in FIFA Intercontinental Cup)	0	32	2
Al-Ahli	2026–27	Saudi Pro League	8	0	1	0	2	0	2 (Note: Appearances in FIFA Intercontinental Cup)	0	13	0
Al-Ahli	Total		78	4	6	0	20	0	6	0	110	4
Career total			226	10	18	0	38	1	7	0	289	11

=== International ===
As of match played 2 October 2026

Appearances and goals by national team and year
National team	Year	Apps	Goals
Turkey	2018	1	0
Turkey	2019	11	0
Turkey	2020	7	0
Turkey	2021	12	1
Turkey	2022	4	1
Turkey	2023	6	0
Turkey	2024	12	2
Turkey	2025	8	2
Turkey	2026	9	0
Total		70	6

Scores and results list Turkey's goal tally first.

List of international goals scored by Merih Demiral
No.	Date	Venue	Opponent	Score	Result	Competition
1	13 November 2021	Başakşehir Fatih Terim Stadium, Istanbul, Turkey	Gibraltar	4–0	6–0	2022 FIFA World Cup qualification
2	4 June 2022	Başakşehir Fatih Terim Stadium, Istanbul, Turkey	Faroe Islands	4–0	4–0	2022–23 UEFA Nations League C
3	2 July 2024	Red Bull Arena, Leipzig, Germany	Austria	1–0	2–1	UEFA Euro 2024
4	2 July 2024	Red Bull Arena, Leipzig, Germany	Austria	2–0	2–1	UEFA Euro 2024
5	14 October 2025	Kocaeli Stadium, Kocaeli, Turkey	Georgia	2–0	4–1	2026 FIFA World Cup qualification
6	14 October 2025	Kocaeli Stadium, Kocaeli, Turkey	Georgia	3–0	4–1	2026 FIFA World Cup qualification

== Honours ==
Sporting CP

- Taça da Liga: 2017–18

Juventus

- Serie A: 2019–20
- Coppa Italia: 2020–21
- Supercoppa Italiana: 2020

Al-Ahli

- Saudi Super Cup: 2025
- AFC Champions League Elite: 2024–25, 2025–26

Turkey U20

- Toulon Tournament third place: 2018
