= Abdulrahman Al-Sanbi =

Saudi Arabian association football player

Personal information
- Full name: Abdulrahman Salem Al-Sanbi
- Date of birth: 3 February 2001 (age 25)
- Place of birth: Jeddah, Saudi Arabia
- Height: 1.81 m (5 ft 11 in)
- Position: Goalkeeper

Team information
- Current team: Al-Ahli
- Number: 1

Youth career
- Al-Ahli

Senior career*
Years	Team	Apps	(Gls)
2021–	Al-Ahli	30	(0)

International career^{‡}
2022–2024	Saudi Arabia U23		
2024–	Saudi Arabia	3	(0)
Medal record
Men's football
Representing Saudi Arabia
Islamic Solidarity Games
Silver medal – second place	2021 Konya
- * Club domestic league appearances and goals as of 30 October 2026 ‡ National team caps and goals as of 8 December 2025

Abdulrahman Salem Al-Sanbi (Arabic: عبد الرحمن سالم الصانبي; born 3 February 2001) is a Saudi Arabian football player who plays as a goalkeeper for Al-Ahli Saudi FC and the Saudi Arabia national team.

== Career statistics ==
=== Club ===
As of match played 20 January 2026

Appearances and goals by club, season and competition
Club	Season	League			King's Cup		Continental		Other		Total	
Club	Season	Division	Apps	Goals	Apps	Goals	Apps	Goals	Apps	Goals	Apps	Goals
Al-Ahli	2022–23	Saudi First Division	8	0	0	0	—		—		8	0
Al-Ahli	2023–24	Saudi Pro League	1	0	0	0	—		—		1	0
Al-Ahli	2024–25	Saudi Pro League	8	0	0	0	4 (Note: Appearances in AFC Champions League Elite)	0	0	0	12	0
Al-Ahli	2025–26	Saudi Pro League	7	0	1	0	3	0	0	0	11	0
Al-Ahli	Total		24	0	1	0	7	0	0	0	32	0
Career total			24	0	1	0	7	0	0	0	32	0

=== International ===
As of match played 8 December 2025

Appearances and goals by national team and year
National team	Year	Apps	Goals
Saudi Arabia	2024	0	0
Saudi Arabia	2025	3	0
Total		3	0

== Honours ==
Al-Ahli

- Saudi First Division League: 2022–23
- Saudi Super Cup: 2025
- AFC Champions League Elite: 2024–25
