= Édouard Mendy =

Senegal international footballer (born 1992)

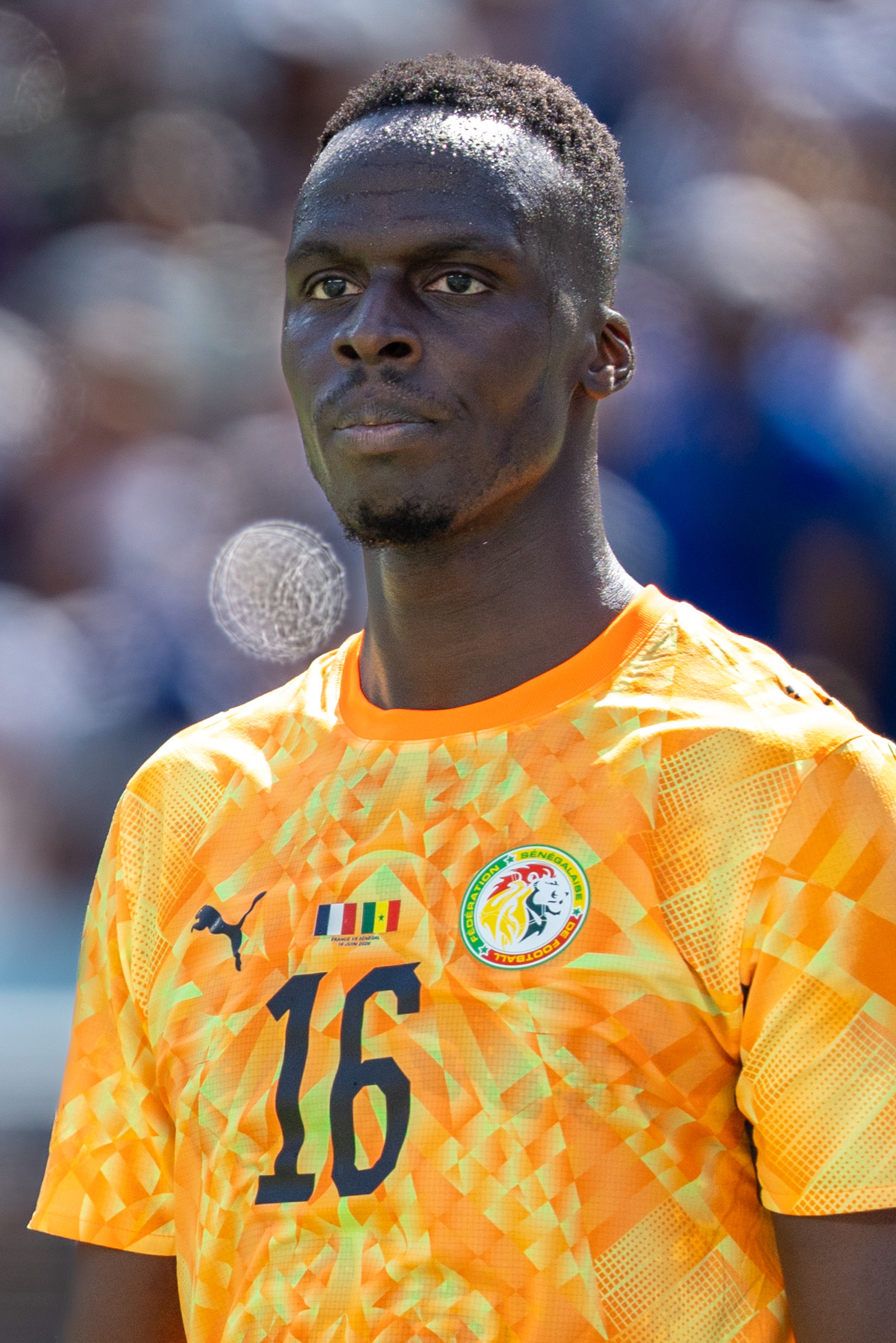
- Mendy with Senegal in 2026

Personal information
- Full name: Édouard Osoque Mendy
- Date of birth: 1 March 1992 (age 34)
- Place of birth: Montivilliers, France
- Height: 1.94 m (6 ft 4 in)
- Position: Goalkeeper

Team information
- Current team: Al-Ahli
- Number: 16

Youth career
- 1999–2005: Le Havre Caucriauville
- 2005–2006: Le Havre
- 2006–2011: CS Municipaux Le Havre

Senior career*
Years	Team	Apps	(Gls)
2011–2014	Cherbourg	26	(0)
2015–2016	Marseille II	8	(0)
2016–2019	Reims	80	(0)
2019–2020	Rennes	25	(0)
2020–2023	Chelsea	75	(0)
2023–	Al-Ahli	94	(0)

International career
2018–2026	Senegal	60	(0)
Medal record
Men's football
Representing Senegal
Africa Cup of Nations
Winner	2021 Cameroon
Runner-up	2019 Egypt
Runner-up	2025 Morocco
- * Club domestic league appearances and goals as of 20:39, 20 November 2026 (UTC)

Édouard Osoque Mendy (born 1 March 1992) is a professional footballer who plays as a goalkeeper for and captains Saudi Pro League club Al-Ahli. Born in France, he played for the Senegal national team.

Starting his career in his native France, Mendy played in the Le Havre academy before signing professional terms with third division Cherbourg in 2011. Mendy was released in 2014, after which he almost quit football, before getting an opportunity with Marseille's reserves. He established himself as regular in the following seasons at Reims and Rennes.

In 2020, Mendy signed for Premier League club Chelsea for a reported fee of £22 million. In his first season, he immediately broke into the starting line-up, becoming the first African goalkeeper to play for the club's senior team, and kept sixteen clean sheets in the Premier League. Mendy also equalled the record for the most clean sheets in a UEFA Champions League season with nine, and kept another clean sheet in the final to help Chelsea win their second title. He was also awarded both the UEFA Goalkeeper of the Year and The Best FIFA Goalkeeper of 2021, becoming the first African goalkeeper in football's history to win both awards. He would continue as the first choice keeper in the 2021–22 season, before subsequently falling out of favour during 2022–23. In 2023, Mendy signed for Saudi Pro League club Al-Ahli for a fee of around £16 million.

Eligible to play for Guinea-Bissau and Senegal through descent and France through birth, Mendy initially joined Guinea-Bissau in honour of his father. However, he subsequently switched allegiance to Senegal, where he became the first-choice goalkeeper for the 2019 Africa Cup of Nations, helping Senegal to a runners-up finish. He then won the 2021 Africa Cup of Nations, while also being named the tournament's best goalkeeper and keeping a clean sheet in the final. He reached another final with Senegal at the 2025 tournament, and additionally featured at the FIFA World Cup in 2022 and 2026.

== Early life ==
Édouard Osoque Mendy was born on 1 March 1992 in Montivilliers, Seine-Maritime in France, to a Senegalese mother and a Bissau-Guinean father. He holds both French and Senegalese nationalities. He is a cousin of fellow footballer Ferland Mendy.

== Club career ==
=== Early career ===
Mendy joined the youth academy of Le Havre AC at the age of 13. After being stuck behind Zacharie Boucher in the talent pool, Mendy dropped down levels to play with CS Municipaux Le Havre. He started his professional career at AS Cherbourg, who were then in the Championnat National, the third tier of the French football league system. He stayed in Cherbourg until the summer of 2014, after which he was without a club for a year. "I did genuinely have my doubts about whether I would carry on", Mendy said in a later interview.

At the age of 22, Mendy registered for unemployment and began to look for jobs outside of football. However, in 2015, Mendy was recommended to fill a goalkeeping vacancy at Marseille by friend and former teammate Ted Lavie. After one phone call with the academy goalkeeping coach, Dominique Bernatowicz, Marseille signed Mendy as their fourth choice goalkeeper. He played the 2015–16 season in Marseille's reserve team, primarily as a backup to Florian Escales.

=== Reims ===
In search of regular playing time, Mendy joined Reims during the 2016–17 Ligue 2 season. On the opening day of the season, Mendy made his debut when Reims' starting goalkeeper Johann Carrasso was sent off five minutes into the match against Amiens. Mendy went on to keep three clean sheets over his next seven games.

The next season, Mendy cemented his role as the starting goalkeeper on a team for the first time, as he helped Reims win the 2017–18 Ligue 2 title as they were promoted to Ligue 1 for the following season. Mendy kept 18 clean sheets in his 34 appearances over the course of the season. In the 2018–19 season, Mendy played in all 38 Ligue 1 games, as newly promoted Reims soared to an eighth-place finish. Mendy kept fourteen clean sheets, the third highest of any goalkeeper in the league.

=== Rennes ===
Mendy joined Rennes in August 2019 for an undisclosed fee, rumoured to be in the region of €4 million, replacing departing goalkeeper Tomáš Koubek. Mendy made his debut on Matchday 3 against Strasbourg after recovering from a broken finger. He saved a penalty to preserve a clean sheet as Rennes won 2–0 at the Stade de la Meinau. Mendy went on to keep nine clean sheets in 24 league matches for Rennes in a season that was shortened due to the COVID-19 pandemic, helping them to a third-place finish and qualification for the UEFA Champions League.

=== Chelsea ===
==== 2020–21 season ====
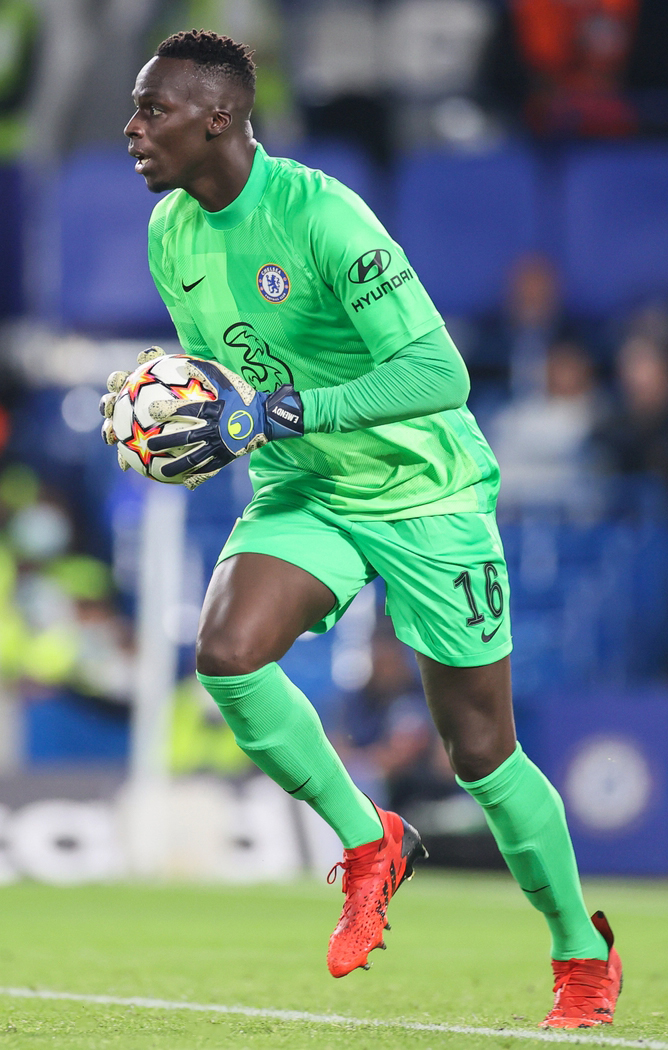
Mendy playing for Chelsea in 2021

English club Chelsea signed Mendy on a five-year contract in September 2020, for a fee reported to be £22 million. On 29 September, Mendy made his debut for the club against Tottenham Hotspur in the fourth round of the EFL Cup, which Chelsea lost 5–4 on penalties after a 1–1 draw. Mendy made his Premier League debut on 3 October, keeping a clean sheet in Chelsea's 4–0 victory over Crystal Palace, becoming the first African goalkeeper to play in the division since Carl Ikeme in 2012.

His clean sheet against Burnley on 31 October made him the first Chelsea goalkeeper to keep a clean sheet in their first three Premier League matches since Petr Čech in 2004. With a clean sheet in the club's next match, a 3–0 win against Mendy's former club Rennes in the Champions League, Chelsea recorded five consecutive clean sheets for the first time in a decade.

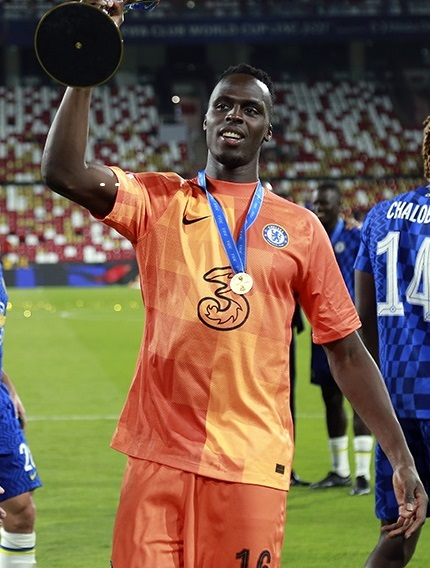
Mendy lifting the 2021 FIFA Club World Cup with Chelsea

On 8 May 2021, Mendy saved a panenka style penalty kick from Sergio Agüero as Chelsea came from 0–1 down to defeat Manchester City 2–1. Three weeks later on 29 May, Mendy became the first African goalkeeper to play in a final of the UEFA Champions League since Bruce Grobbelaar, who appeared in the 1985 European Cup final. Chelsea defeated Manchester City 1–0 in the final. He also equaled the record of most clean sheets in a Champions League season, by keeping nine clean sheets, the same as Santiago Cañizares in 2000–01 and Keylor Navas in 2015–16.

==== 2021–22 season ====
Mendy started the UEFA Super Cup tie against Villarreal, making important saves in the tie that went to extra time. He was replaced by Kepa Arrizabalaga for the penalty shoot-out, which Chelsea went on to win for a second Super Cup title.

Mendy finished second in the Yashin Award to Italy goalkeeper Gianluigi Donnarumma, who saved two penalties in the UEFA Euro 2020 final. Mendy did, however, win the FIFA Best Goalkeeper award.

In February 2022, after winning the 2021 Africa Cup of Nations with Senegal, Mendy returned from international duty to take part in the 2021 FIFA Club World Cup, starting in the final as he won a second trophy in two weeks.

==== 2022–23 season ====
Mendy began the 2022–23 season as first choice but started poorly, and suffered an injury that meant he was unavailable when Graham Potter replaced Thomas Tuchel as the club's manager. Potter decided not to commit to naming either Mendy or Arrizabalaga as first choice; ultimately, Arrizabalaga would keep his place and Mendy would play just three times after Potter's appointment.

=== Al Ahli ===
Mendy signed for Saudi Pro League club Al Ahli on 28 June 2023 on a three-year contract, for a fee reported in the British media to be around £16 million. In the final match held in Jeddah on 3 May 2025, he became a member of the squad that won the first-ever AFC Champions League Elite title at the 2024–25 season, following a victory against the Japanese representative, Kawasaki Frontale at the final.

Mendy was also the best goalkeeper in the competition. In December that year, he signed a new contract with the club until 2028. In the following season, he lifted the 2025–26 AFC Champions League Elite trophy as the club's captain after a 1–0 extra-time win over Machida Zelvia in the final.

== International career ==
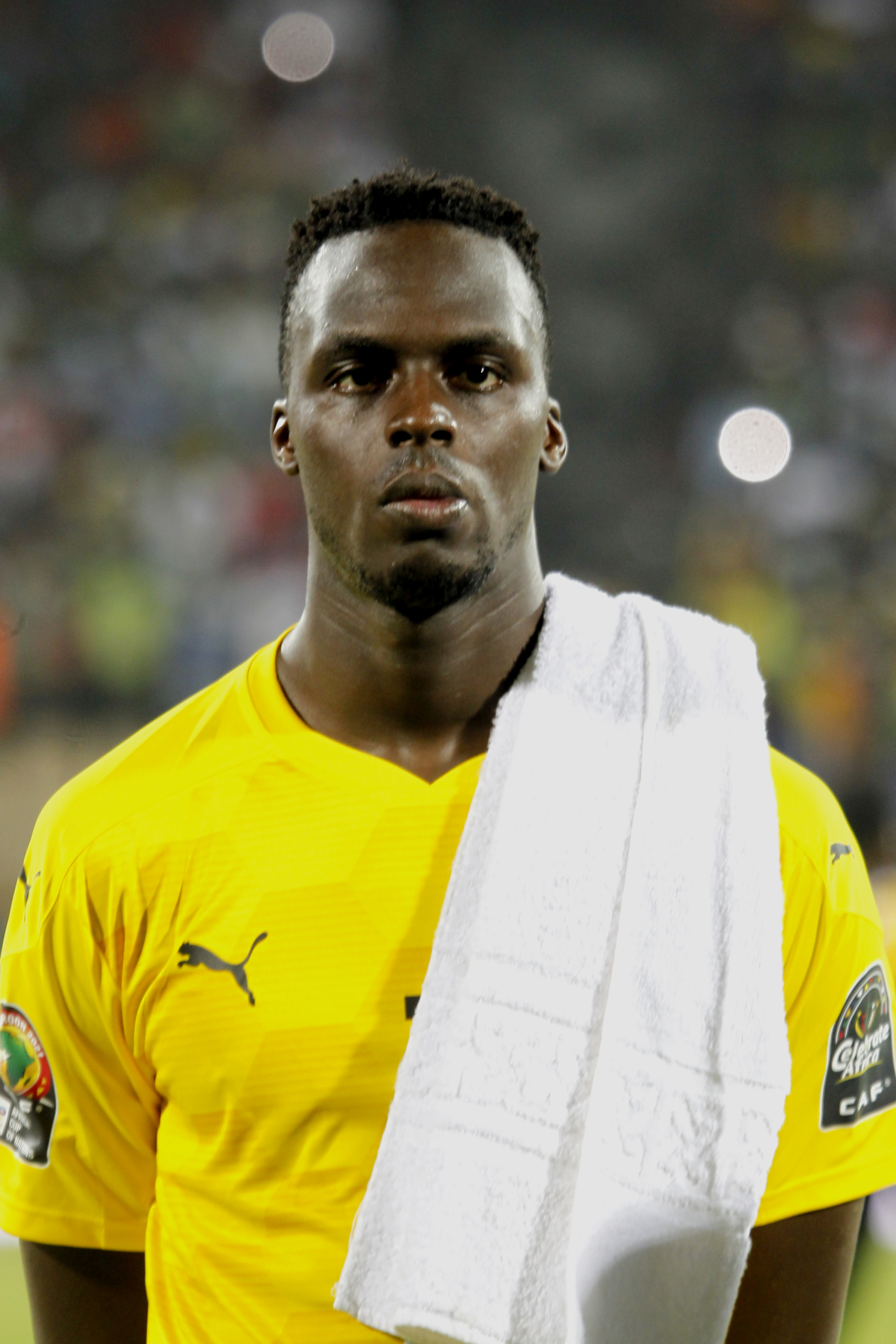
Mendy lining up for Senegal in 2022

In November 2016, Mendy was called up by Guinea-Bissau to play friendly matches against Portuguese clubs Belenenses and Estoril. At the time, his father was very ill and was about to pass away, leading Mendy to honour him playing for the Guinea-Bissau national team. Shortly after, he was shortlisted by Guinea-Bissau to play the 2017 Africa Cup of Nations for them, but he ultimately rejected the call and pledged his future to Senegal.

Mendy made his debut for Senegal in a 1–0 win over Equatorial Guinea on 18 November 2018. Mendy went on to become Senegal's first choice goalkeeper leading up to the 2019 Africa Cup of Nations. He started in both Senegal's opening two group stage matches, a 2–0 win over Tanzania and a 1–0 defeat to Algeria. However, he was injured during the warmups before Senegal's final group stage match against Kenya, and was forced to withdraw from the squad with a broken finger as Senegal would go on to lose in the final 1–0 to Algeria.

In January 2022, Mendy was included in Senegal's squad for the 2021 Africa Cup of Nations in Cameroon. In his first appearance of the competition on 10 January against Zimbabwe, he kept a clean sheet in a 1–0 win for Senegal. After the group stage, Mendy helped his nation to progress to the final. In the final on 6 February against Egypt at Olembe Stadium, following a goalless draw after extra time, Mendy saved a spot kick from Mohanad Lasheen and another hit the post during the penalty shoot-out to win the tournament for Senegal for the first time. For his performances throughout the competition, including keeping four clean sheets, he was named the tournament's best goalkeeper.

Mendy represented Senegal at the 2022 FIFA World Cup, as the nation reached the round of 16 for the first time since its debut in 2002. He started every match including Senegal's final defeat to England. In December 2023, he was named in the squad for the postponed 2023 Africa Cup of Nations held in the Ivory Coast, starting every match as Senegal reached the round of 16.

In December 2025, Mendy was called up for the 2025 Africa Cup of Nations. He played every minute for Senegal as they again reached the final; in the title decider against hosts Morocco; Mendy saved Brahim Díaz's controversially-awarded panenka penalty in the final moments of regulation time, before denying speculations after the match that the penalty had been missed intentionally. Although Senegal won the match 1–0 after extra time, the title was later awarded to Morocco after Senegal was deemed to have forfeited the final by leaving the pitch in protest of Morocco's penalty.

On 2 June 2026, Mendy was selected by Senegal coach Pape Thiaw in the 26-man squad for the 2026 FIFA World Cup. In Senegal's second match against Norway on 22 June, Mendy was substituted in the second half after suffering a knee injury, and failed to make another appearance at the tournament.

On 13 September 2026, Mendy announced his retirement from the Senegal national team via social media.

== Style of play ==
Mendy has been described as a physically dominant goalkeeper who exerts a strong influence in the defensive third. In the 2019–20 season with Rennes, Mendy recorded a 75.3% save success rate, the highest in Ligue 1, averaging 2.5 saves per game. In the same season, Mendy completed 51.4% of his passes over 40 yards, the same as Ederson, who is highly regarded for his kicking ability. Mendy is an aerially assertive goalkeeper, frequently coming off his line to claim crosses. He is also very vocal, often organizing his defenders' positioning. Upon his arrival at Chelsea, former manager Frank Lampard praised his positive attitude and work ethic.

He was appointed a Grand Officer of the National Order of the Lion by President of Senegal Macky Sall following the nation's victory at the 2021 Africa Cup of Nations.

== Career statistics ==
=== Club ===
As of match played 19 September 2026

Appearances and goals by club, season and competition
Club	Season	League			National cup (Note: Includes Coupe de France, FA Cup, King's Cup)		League cup (Note: Includes Coupe de la Ligue, EFL Cup)		Continental		Other		Total	
Club	Season	Division	Apps	Goals	Apps	Goals	Apps	Goals	Apps	Goals	Apps	Goals	Apps	Goals
Cherbourg	2011–12	Championnat National	5	0			—		—		—		5	0
Cherbourg	2012–13	Championnat National	3	0			—		—		—		3	0
Cherbourg	2013–14	CFA	18	0			—		—		—		18	0
Cherbourg	Total		26	0			—		—		—		26	0
Marseille II	2015–16	CFA	8	0	—		—		—		—		8	0
Reims	2016–17	Ligue 2	8	0	2	0	1	0	—		—		11	0
Reims	2017–18	Ligue 2	34	0	0	0	0	0	—		—		34	0
Reims	2018–19	Ligue 1	38	0	2	0	1	0	—		—		41	0
Reims	Total		80	0	4	0	2	0	—		—		86	0
Reims II	2016–17	CFA	1	0	—		—		—		—		1	0
Rennes	2019–20	Ligue 1	24	0	5	0	0	0	4 (Note: Appearances in UEFA Europa League)	0	—		33	0
Rennes	2020–21	Ligue 1	1	0	—		—		—		—		1	0
Rennes	Total		25	0	5	0	0	0	4	0	—		34	0
Chelsea	2020–21	Premier League	31	0	0	0	1	0	12 (Note: Appearance(s) in UEFA Champions League)	0	—		44	0
Chelsea	2021–22	Premier League	34	0	3	0	1	0	9	0	2 (Note: One appearance in UEFA Super Cup, one appearance in FIFA Club World Cup)	0	49	0
Chelsea	2022–23	Premier League	10	0	0	0	1	0	1	0	—		12	0
Chelsea	Total		75	0	3	0	3	0	22	0	2	0	105	0
Al-Ahli	2023–24	Saudi Pro League	33	0	2	0	—		—		—		35	0
Al-Ahli	2024–25	Saudi Pro League	28	0	1	0	—		9 (Note: Appearances in AFC Champions League Elite)	0	1 (Note: Appearance in Saudi Super Cup)	0	39	0
Al-Ahli	2025–26	Saudi Pro League	26	0	3	0	—		9	0	3 (Note: Two appearances in Saudi Super Cup, one appearance in FIFA Intercontinental Cup)	0	41	0
Al-Ahli	2026–27	Saudi Pro League	6	0	0	0	—		1	0	2 (Note: Appearances in FIFA Intercontinental Cup)	0	9	0
Al-Ahli	Total		93	0	6	0	—		19	0	6	0	124	0
Career total			307	0	18	0	5	0	45	0	8	0	383	0

=== International ===
Appearances and goals by national team and year
National team	Year	Apps	Goals
Senegal	2018	1	0
Senegal	2019	6	0
Senegal	2020	2	0
Senegal	2021	6	0
Senegal	2022	13	0
Senegal	2023	4	0
Senegal	2024	10	0
Senegal	2025	11	0
Senegal	2026	7	0
Total		60	0

== Honours ==
Reims

- Ligue 2: 2017–18

Chelsea

- UEFA Champions League: 2020–21
- UEFA Super Cup: 2021
- FIFA Club World Cup: 2021
- FA Cup runner-up: 2020–21, 2021–22
- EFL Cup runner-up: 2021–22

Al-Ahli

- AFC Champions League Elite: 2024–25, 2025–26
- Saudi Super Cup: 2025

Senegal

- Africa Cup of Nations: 2021; runner-up: 2019, 2025

Individual

- The Best FIFA Men's Goalkeeper: 2021
- UEFA Champions League Goalkeeper of the Season: 2020–21
- UEFA Champions League Squad of the Season: 2020–21
- Ghana Football Awards Best African International: 2021
- Africa Cup of Nations Best Goalkeeper: 2021
- Africa Cup of Nations Team of the Tournament: 2021
- AFC Champions League Elite Best Goalkeeper: 2024–25
- Saudi Pro League Golden Glove: 2025–26
- Saudi Pro League Goalkeeper of the Month: April 2025, September 2025

Orders

- Grand Officer of the National Order of the Lion: 2022
