= Ayman Fallatah =

Saudi Arabian footballer

Personal information
- Full name: Ayman Yousef Fallatah
- Date of birth: October 2, 2003 (age 23)
- Place of birth: Jeddah, Saudi Arabia
- Height: 1.90 m (6 ft 3 in)
- Position: Midfielder

Team information
- Current team: Neom (on loan from Al-Ahli)
- Number: 95

Youth career
- Al-Ahli

Senior career*
Years	Team	Apps	(Gls)
2023–	Al-Ahli	0	(0)
2024–2025	→ Damac (loan)	25	(1)
2026–	→ Neom (loan)	5	(0)

International career
2024–	Saudi Arabia U23		
2024–	Saudi Arabia		
- * Club domestic league appearances and goals as of 21 November 2026

Ayman Fallatah (Arabic: أيمن فلاتة; born 2 October 2003) is a Saudi Arabian professional footballer who plays as a midfielder for Saudi Pro League side Neom, on loan from Al-Ahli and the Saudi Arabia national team.

== Club career ==
Fallatah started his career at the youth teams of Al-Ahli. On 16 February 2022, Fallatah signed his first professional contract with the club. On 30 August 2024, Fallatah joined Pro League side Damac on loan. On 13 September 2024, Fallatah made his Pro League debut for Damac, starting in the 3–1 win against Al-Okhdood. On 20 September 2024, Fallatah scored his first goal for the club in a 4–2 loss against parent club Al-Ahli. On 1 August 2025, Fallatah renewed his contract with Al-Ahli until the end of the 2028–29 season. On 13 January 2026, Fallatah joined Pro League side Neom on loan.

== International career ==
In November 2024, Fallatah earned his first senior call-up for the 2026 FIFA World Cup qualifiers against Australia and Indonesia. He was an unused substitute in both matches.

In December 2024, Fallatah was called up for the 26th Arabian Gulf Cup. He made 0 appearances as the Green Falcons were elimanted in the semi-finals.
