= Saleh Abu Al-Shamat =

Saudi Arabian footballer

Personal information
- Full name: Saleh Waheeb Saeed Abu Al-Shamat
- Date of birth: 11 August 2002 (age 24)
- Place of birth: Jeddah, Saudi Arabia
- Height: 1.71 m (5 ft 7 1/2 in)
- Position: Midfielder

Team information
- Current team: Al-Ahli
- Number: 47

Youth career
- 2010–2017: Al-Ahli
- 2017–2021: Al-Qadsiah

Senior career*
Years	Team	Apps	(Gls)
2021–2024	Al-Qadsiah	34	(4)
2024	→ Al-Taawoun (loan)	2	(0)
2024–2025	Al-Khaleej	30	(1)
2025–	Al-Ahli	35	(1)

International career^{‡}
2020–2022	Saudi Arabia U20		
2022–	Saudi Arabia U23		
2025–	Saudi Arabia	16	(2)
- * Club domestic league appearances and goals as of 9 October 2026 ‡ National team caps and goals as of 22:21, 6 October 2026 (UTC)

Saleh Waheeb Abu Al-Shamat (Arabic: صالح وهيب أبو الشامات; born 11 August 2002) is a Saudi Arabian footballer who plays as a midfielder for Al-Ahli and the Saudi Arabia national team. He is the twin brother of fellow player Mohammed Abu Al-Shamat.

== Club career ==
Abu Al-Shamat started his career at the age of 8 in youth teams of Al-Ahli. He moved to Al-Qadsiah in 2017. On 5 November 2020, he signed his first professional contract with Al-Qadsiah. On 14 May 2021, Abu Al-Shamat made his debut for Al-Qadsiah in the 1–0 loss against former club Al-Ahli. On 24 January 2024, Abu Al-Shamat joined Al-Taawoun on a six-month loan.

On 22 July 2024, Abu Al-Shamat joined Al-Khaleej on a three-year deal. On 1 August 2025, he joined Al-Ahli on a three-year deal.

== International career ==
On 4 September 2025, Abu Al-Shamat made his international debut for Saudi Arabia in a 2–1 friendly victory over North Macedonia. A month later, on 8 October, he scored his first international goal in a 3–2 win against Indonesia during the fourth round of the 2026 FIFA World Cup qualification.

== Career statistics ==
=== International ===
As of match played 6 October 2026

Appearances and goals by national team and year
National team	Year	Apps	Goals
Saudi Arabia	2025	10	2
Saudi Arabia	2026	6	0
Total		16	2

Scores and results list Saudi Arabia's goal tally first, score column indicates score after each Al-Shamat goal.

List of international goals scored by Saleh Abu Al-Shamat
No.	Date	Venue	Opponent	Score	Result	Competition
1	8 October 2025	King Abdullah Sports City Stadium, Jeddah, Saudi Arabia	Indonesia	1–1	3–2	2026 FIFA World Cup qualification
2	14 November 2025	Prince Abdullah Al-Faisal Sports City Stadium, Jeddah, Saudi Arabia	Ivory Coast	1–0	1–0	Friendly
