= 2024–25 Al-Okhdood Club season =

Al-Okhdood
2024–25 season
- President: Sami Al Fadhel
- Manager: Stjepan Tomas (until 2 March); Paulo Sérgio (from 2 March)
- Stadium: Prince Hathloul bin Abdulaziz Sports City
- SPL: 15th
- King Cup: Round of 32 (knocked out by Al-Arabi)
- Top goalscorer: League: Saviour Godwin (7); All: Saviour Godwin (7)
- Highest home attendance: 5,099 v Al-Hilal; 24 August 2024; Saudi Pro League
- Lowest home attendance: 431 v Al-Orobah; 31 October 2024; Saudi Pro League
- Average home league attendance: 1,635
- All statistics correct as of 26 May 2025.

The 2024–25 season was Al-Okhdood's second consecutive season in the Pro League and 48th year in existence. The club participated in the Pro League and the King Cup.

The season covers the period from 1 July 2024 to 30 June 2025.

== Players ==
=== Squad information ===
As of 1 February 2025

Note: Flags indicate national team as defined under FIFA eligibility rules; some limited exceptions apply. Players may hold more than one non-FIFA nationality.

No.	Pos.	Nation	Player
1	GK	KSA	Rakan Al-Najjar
2	DF	KSA	Mohammed Al-Saeed
4	DF	KSA	Saeed Al-Rubaie
7	FW	GUI	Ousmane Barry
8	DF	KSA	Hussain Al-Zabdani
10	FW	NGR	Saviour Godwin
11	MF	ZIM	Knowledge Musona
12	MF	KSA	Abdulaziz Al Hotailah
13	FW	CMR	Christian Bassogog
14	FW	KSA	Saleh Al Abbas
15	DF	KSA	Naif Asiri
16	DF	BRA	Diego Ferreira
17	DF	JAM	Damion Lowe
18	MF	COL	Sebastián Pedroza

No.	Pos.	Nation	Player
19	MF	KSA	Saud Salem
20	MF	KSA	Saleh Al-Harthi
21	FW	KSA	Mohammed Naif
22	GK	KSA	Mohammed Al-Qareh
26	MF	KSA	Yaseen Al-Zubaidi (on loan from Al-Ahli)
27	DF	KSA	Awadh Khamis
28	GK	BRA	Paulo Vítor
29	MF	KSA	Ahmed Al Daghrir
64	FW	EGY	Karim Ashraf
66	MF	BRA	Petros
77	MF	KSA	Saif Balhareth
87	MF	KSA	Ghassan Hawsawi
92	GK	KSA	Saad Al-Qarni
98	DF	KSA	Muhannad Al-Qaydhi

=== Out on loan ===
Note: Flags indicate national team as defined under FIFA eligibility rules; some limited exceptions apply. Players may hold more than one non-FIFA nationality.

No.	Pos.	Nation	Player
—	MF	KSA	Mesleh Al-Shaikh (on loan to Al-Arabi)

== Transfers and loans ==
=== Transfers in ===
Entry date	Position	No.	Player	From club	Fee	Ref.
1 July 2024	DF	4	(Saudi Arabia) Saeed Al-Rubaie	(Saudi Arabia) Al-Shabab	Free	
17 July 2024	DF	2	(Saudi Arabia) Mohammed Al-Saeed	(Saudi Arabia) Al-Fateh	Free	
3 August 2024	GK	1	(Saudi Arabia) Rakan Al-Najjar	(Saudi Arabia) Al-Riyadh	Free	
3 August 2024	DF	87	(Saudi Arabia) Ghassan Hawsawi	(Saudi Arabia) Al-Wehda	Free	
11 August 2024	MF	11	(Zimbabwe) Knowledge Musona	(Saudi Arabia) Al-Riyadh	Free	
12 August 2024	FW	14	(Saudi Arabia) Saleh Al Abbas	(Saudi Arabia) Al-Riyadh	Free	
13 August 2024	MF	18	(Colombia) Sebastián Pedroza	(Colombia) Santa Fe	$1,500,000	
14 August 2024	GK	92	(Saudi Arabia) Saad Al-Qarni	(Saudi Arabia) Al-Ula	Free	
27 August 2024	DF	17	(Jamaica) Damion Lowe	(United States) Philadelphia Union	$200,000	
29 August 2024	MF	66	(Brazil) Petros	(Saudi Arabia) Neom	Free	
1 September 2024	FW	13	(Cameroon) Christian Bassogog	(Turkey) Ankaragücü	$885,000	
2 September 2024	DF	16	(Brazil) Diego Ferreira	(Brazil) Pombal	Free	
2 September 2024	DF	98	(Saudi Arabia) Muhannad Al-Qaydhi	(Saudi Arabia) Al-Fayha	Free	
2 September 2024	FW	64	(Egypt) Karim Ashraf	(Saudi Arabia) Al-Hilal	Free	
2 February 2025	FW	–	(Guinea) Ousmane Barry	(Saudi Arabia) Al-Ula	Free	

=== Loans in ===
Start date	End date	Position	No.	Player	From club	Fee	Ref.
30 August 2024	End of season	FW	9	(Mali) Ibrahima Koné	(Spain) Almería	None	
31 January 2025	End of season	MF	–	(Saudi Arabia) Yaseen Al-Zubaidi	(Saudi Arabia) Al-Ahli	None	

=== Transfers out ===
Exit date	Position	No.	Player	To club	Fee	Ref.
30 June 2024	DF	4	(Saudi Arabia) Saeed Al-Rubaie	(Saudi Arabia) Al-Shabab	End of loan	
30 June 2024	DF	20	(Saudi Arabia) Hamad Al Mansour	(Saudi Arabia) Al-Nassr	End of loan	
30 June 2024	MF	11	(Spain) Álex Collado	(Spain) Real Betis	End of loan	
30 June 2024	MF	14	(Egypt) Ahmed Mostafa	(Egypt) Smouha	End of loan	
30 June 2024	MF	18	(Colombia) Sebastián Pedroza	(Colombia) Santa Fe	End of loan	
30 June 2024	MF	29	(Saudi Arabia) Yaseen Al-Zubaidi	(Saudi Arabia) Al-Ahli	End of loan	
30 June 2024	FW	24	(Saudi Arabia) Mourad Khodari	(Saudi Arabia) Al-Ahli	End of loan	
10 July 2024	DF	3	(Romania) Andrei Burcă	(United Arab Emirates) Baniyas	Free	
21 July 2024	GK	30	(Saudi Arabia) Saad Al-Saleh	(Saudi Arabia) Al-Zulfi	Free	
24 July 2024	GK	25	(Saudi Arabia) Abdulaziz Al-Awairdhi	(Saudi Arabia) Al-Riyadh	Free	
25 July 2024	MF	77	(Saudi Arabia) Hassan Al-Habib	(Saudi Arabia) Al-Diriyah	Free	
5 August 2024	MF	49	(Saudi Arabia) Rayan Hattan	(Saudi Arabia) Al-Rayyan	Free	
7 August 2024	MF	10	(Romania) Florin Tănase	(Romania) FCSB	Free	
23 August 2024	DF	2	(Saudi Arabia) Abdulrahman Al-Rio	(Saudi Arabia) Abha	Free	
28 August 2024	FW	9	(Cameroon) Léandre Tawamba	(Saudi Arabia) Al-Tai	Free	
2 September 2024	DF	5	(Georgia (country)) Solomon Kvirkvelia	(Georgia (country)) Dinamo Tbilisi	Free	
31 January 2025	MF	6	(Saudi Arabia) Eid Al-Muwallad	(Saudi Arabia) Al-Ahli	Undisclosed	

=== Loans out ===
Start date	End date	Position	No.	Player	To club	Fee	Ref.
8 July 2024	End of season	MF	13	(Saudi Arabia) Mesleh Al-Shaikh	(Saudi Arabia) Al-Arabi	None	

== Pre-season ==
29 July 2024 Friendly	Al-Okhdood (Saudi Arabia)	2–1	(Turkmenistan) Şagadam	Turkey
17:00 TRT	Al-Zabdani; Al Jahif	Report

4 August 2024 Friendly	Al-Okhdood (Saudi Arabia)	1–3	(Turkmenistan) Ahal	Gölcük, Turkey
TRT	Al Jahif		Meredov; Tagaýew; Diniýew	Stadium: Gölcük Şehir Stadyumu

11 August 2024 Friendly	Al-Okhdood (Saudi Arabia)	0–1	(Bahrain) Al-Khaldiya	Başiskele, Turkey
17:00 TRT		Report	Al-Humaidan 47'	Stadium: Sporterio Arena

== Competitions ==
=== Overview ===
Competition	Record							
Competition	Pld	W	D	L	GF	GA	GD	Win %
Pro League	34	9	7	18	33	56	−23	26.47
King Cup	1	0	0	1	1	2	−1	0.00
Total	35	9	7	19	34	58	−24	25.71

Updated to match played 26 May 2025
Source: Competitions

=== Pro League ===
==== League table ====
Pos	Team	Pld	W	D	L	GF	GA	GD	Pts	Qualification or relegation
13	Al-Fayha	34	8	12	14	27	49	−22	36	
14	Damac	34	9	8	17	37	50	−13	35	
15	Al-Okhdood	34	9	7	18	33	56	−23	34	
16	Al-Wehda (R)	34	9	6	19	42	67	−25	33	Relegation to First Division League
17	Al-Orobah (R)	34	9	3	22	31	74	−43	30	Relegation to First Division League

Source: SPL
Rules for classification: 1) Points; 2) Head-to-head points; 3) Head-to-head goal difference; 4) Total goal difference; 5) Total goals scored; 6) Fair-play points
(Note: Head-to-head record is used only after all the matches between the teams in question have been played).
(R) Relegated

==== Results summary ====
Overall								Home						Away					
Pld	W	D	L	GF	GA	GD	Pts	W	D	L	GF	GA	GD	W	D	L	GF	GA	GD
34	9	7	18	33	56	−23	34	3	4	10	15	31	−16	6	3	8	18	25	−7

Last updated: 26 May 2025.
Source: Saudi Pro League

==== Results by round ====
Round	1	2	3	4	5	6	7	8	9	10	11	12	13	14	15	16	17	18	19	20	21	22	23	24	25	26	27	28	29	30	31	32	33	34
Ground	H	A	A	H	A	H	H	A	H	A	H	H	A	A	H	A	H	A	H	H	A	H	A	A	H	A	H	A	A	H	H	A	H	A
Result	L	L	L	D	W	L	L	D	W	L	D	L	W	L	L	W	L	L	L	D	L	L	D	L	W	W	D	D	W	L	L	L	W	W
Position	17	18	17	17	13	17	17	17	13	14	14	15	14	15	15	13	13	14	15	15	16	17	17	17	16	15	16	17	15	17	17	17	16	15

Updated to match(es) played on 26 May 2025. Source: Saudi Pro League
A = Away; H = Home; W = Win; D = Draw; L = Loss

==== Matches ====
All times are local, AST (UTC+3).

Win Draw Loss Postponed

24 August 2024 1	Al-Okhdood	0–3	Al-Hilal	Najran
21:00	Hawsawi (yellow card) 20'; Al-Muwallad (yellow card) 30'; Al-Zabdani (yellow card) 38'	Report	Mitrović 4', 39'; Milinković-Savić 45+1'	Stadium: Prince Hathloul bin Abdulaziz Sports City; Attendance: 5,099; Referee: Fedayi San (Switzerland)

28 August 2024 2	Al-Ettifaq	1–0	Al-Okhdood	Dammam
21:00	Dembélé 63'	Report	Asiri (yellow card) 18'	Stadium: Al-Ettifaq Club Stadium; Attendance: 3,276; Referee: Khalid Al-Teris

13 September 2024 3	Damac	3–1	Al-Okhdood	Khamis Mushait
18:50	Al-Zabdani 6' (o.g.); Nkoudou 12', 28' (pen.); Al-Anazi (yellow card) 35'; Niță (yellow card) 72'	Report	Al-Rubaie (yellow card) 26'; Musona 73'; Al-Zabdani (yellow card) 90+4'	Stadium: Damac Club Stadium; Attendance: 3,065; Referee: Majed Al-Shamrani

19 September 2024 4	Al-Okhdood	0–0	Al-Qadsiah	Najran
18:40	Lowe (yellow card) 16' (yellow-red card) 90+7'; Pedroza (yellow card) 82'	Report	Quiñones (red card) 45'; Nández (yellow card) 87'; Nacho (yellow card) 90+3'	Stadium: Prince Hathloul bin Abdul Aziz Sports City; Attendance: 1,219; Referee: Sultan Al-Harbi

28 September 2024 5	Al-Fateh	2–4	Al-Okhdood	Al-Hasa
18:10	Djaniny 7'; Bendebka 19', (yellow card) 35'; Al-Mousa (red card) 54'	Report	Koné 26'; Al-Rubaie (yellow card) 50' (yellow-red card) 59'; Asiri 70'; Musona 74'; Al Jahif 90+1'	Stadium: Al-Fateh Club Stadium; Attendance: Abdullah Al-Shehri; Referee: 3,793

3 October 2024 6	Al-Okhdood	1–2	Al-Ittihad	Najran
21:00	Koné (yellow card) 81'; Al Abbas (yellow card) 88', (goal) 90+5'; Vítor (yellow card) 90+10'	Report	Benzema 50'; Fabinho (yellow card) 52'; Diaby (yellow card) 83'; Aouar 89'; Al-Shehri (yellow card) 90+7'	Stadium: Prince Hathloul bin Abdulaziz Sports City; Attendance: 4,096; Referee: Mohammed Al-Ismail

20 October 2024 7	Al-Okhdood	0–1	Al-Riyadh	Najran
18:20	Koné (yellow card) 45+1'; Al-Muwallad (yellow card) 48'; Ferreira (yellow card) 50'; Khamis (yellow card) 55'	Report	Mensah (yellow card) 15'; Al-Khaibari (yellow card) 45+1'; Tozé 53'; Bayesh (yellow card) 90+7'	Stadium: Prince Hathloul bin Abdulaziz Sports City; Attendance: 447; Referee: Mamdouh Al Shahdan

25 October 2024 8	Al-Ahli	1–1	Al-Okhdood	Jeddah
21:00	Al-Hamad (yellow card) 45+5'; Mahrez 62'; Al-Hurayji (yellow card) 90+2'	Report	Khamis (yellow card) 28'; Godwin 45+6', (yellow card) 90+13'; Al-Qaydhi (yellow card) 56'; Pedroza (yellow card) 90+1'; Vítor (yellow card) 90+6'	Stadium: King Abdullah Sports City; Attendance: 11,491; Referee: Abdullah Al-Kharboush

31 October 2024 9	Al-Okhdood	4–0	Al-Orobah	Najran
18:10	Koné 45+5' (pen.); Bassogog 64', 83'; Al-Rubaie 81'	Report		Stadium: Prince Hathloul bin Abdulaziz Sports City; Attendance: 431; Referee: Mohammed Al-Hoaish

9 November 2024 10	Al-Taawoun	1–0	Al-Okhdood	Buraidah
20:00	Flávio (yellow card) 89'; Barrow 90+3'; Adam (yellow card) 90+6'	Report	Lowe (yellow card) 13'; Koné (yellow card) 32'; Al-Rubaie (yellow card) 90+5'; Petros (yellow card) 90+5'	Stadium: Al-Taawoun Club Stadium; Attendance: 2,745; Referee: Shukri Al-Hanfoush

22 November 2024 11	Al-Okhdood	1–1	Al-Shabab	Najran
18:05	Godwin (yellow card) 45'; Musona 49'; Asiri (yellow card) 72'; Petros (yellow card) 80'; Al-Qaydhi (yellow card) 90+8'	Report	Al-Sharari (yellow card) 45'; Asiri 45+3' (o.g.); Podence (yellow card) 57'	Stadium: Prince Hathloul bin Abdulaziz Sports City; Attendance: 1,464; Referee: Abdullah Al-Harbi

28 November 2024 12	Al-Okhdood	1–2	Al-Kholood	Najran
18:05	Al-Qaydhi (yellow card) 27'; Godwin 62'; Petros (yellow card) 89'	Report	Maolida 25' (pen.); Al-Shamrani (yellow card) 30'; Al-Hammami (yellow card) 45+2'; Gyömbér (yellow card) 55'; Al-Oraini 90+5'	Stadium: Prince Hathloul bin Abdulaziz Sports City; Attendance: 627; Referee: Faisal Al-Blwi

5 December 2024 13	Al-Wehda	2–3	Al-Okhdood	Mecca
18:15	Ighalo 5'; Al-Alaeli (yellow card) 45+6'; Goodwin 58'; Crețu (yellow card) 90+4'	Report	Bassogog 32'; Koné 36', (yellow card) 61'; El Yamiq 40' (o.g.); Al-Rubaie (yellow card) 53'	Stadium: King Abdulaziz Sports City; Attendance: 405; Referee: Sami Al-Jires

9 January 2025 14	Al-Nassr	3–1	Al-Okhdood	Riyadh
20:00	Laporte (yellow card) 8'; Mané 29', 88'; Ronaldo 42' (pen.); Al-Ghannam (yellow card) 70'	Report	Godwin 6'; Lowe (yellow card) 34'	Stadium: Al-Awwal Park; Attendance: 16,458; Referee: Mario Escobar (Guatemala)

16 January 2025 15	Al-Okhdood	1–2	Al-Fayha	Najran
16:55	Khamis (yellow card) 18'; Musona 45+6' (pen.); Lowe (yellow card) 75'	Report	Pozuelo 34'; López (yellow card) 36'; Sakala 87' (pen.); Mosquera (yellow card) 90+2'	Stadium: Prince Hathloul bin Abdulaziz Sports City; Attendance: 986; Referee: Ahmed Al-Rumaikhani

20 January 2025 16	Al-Raed	0–2	Al-Okhdood	Buraidah
18:15	Al-Subaie (yellow card) 83'	Report	Pedroza 28'; Bassogog 66'; Al-Qaydhi (yellow card) 87'; Koné (yellow card) 90+1' (yellow-red card) 90+9'	Stadium: King Abdullah Sports City; Attendance: 2,060; Referee: Majed Al-Shamrani

26 January 2025 17	Al-Okhdood	1–2	Al-Khaleej	Najran
18:30	Khamis (yellow card) 83'; Al-Samiri 90+5' (o.g.); Petros (yellow card) 90+6'; Al-Harthi (yellow card) 90+7'	Report	Martins (yellow card) 45+3'; Aboulshamat 66'; Sherif 69'; Al-Samiri (yellow card) 90+1'	Stadium: Prince Hathloul bin Abdulaziz Sports City; Attendance: 1,244; Referee: Sultan Al-Harbi

31 January 2025 18	Al-Hilal	4–0	Al-Okhdood	Riyadh
18:15	Kaio 4'; Milinković-Savić 43'; Leonardo 45+2', 55'	Report	Koné (yellow card) 26'; Godwin (yellow card) 29'; Al-Rubaie (yellow card) 44'	Stadium: Kingdom Arena; Attendance: 22,326; Referee: Marian Barbu (Romania)

8 February 2025 19	Al-Okhdood	0–2	Al-Ettifaq	Najran
18:40	Khamis (yellow card) 51'; Petros (yellow card) 52'; Al-Zabdani (red card) 90+3'	Report	Wijnaldum 7'; Toko Ekambi (yellow card) 45+3', (goal) 73'; Al-Khateeb (yellow card) 64'	Stadium: Prince Hathloul bin Abdulaziz Sports City; Attendance: 980; Referee: Abdulsamad Bakri

13 February 2025 20	Al-Okhdood	0–0	Damac	Najran
17:10	Hawsawi (yellow card) 45+5'; Petros (yellow card) 57'; Bassogog (yellow card) 63'; Al-Saeed (yellow card) 80'; Asiri (yellow card) 90+10'	Report	Al-Nemer (red card) 12'; Fallatah (yellow card) 87'	Stadium: Prince Hathloul bin Abdulaziz Sports City; Attendance: 781; Referee: Mohammed Al-Dagash

21 February 2025 21	Al-Qadsiah	2–0	Al-Okhdood	Dammam
18:10	Quiñones 31' (pen.); Al-Ammar 51'	Report	Al-Rubaie (yellow card) 48'	Stadium: Prince Mohamed bin Fahd Stadium; Attendance: 7,728; Referee: João Pinheiro (Portugal)

24 February 2025 22	Al-Okhdood	1–3	Al-Fateh	Najran
17:15	Musona 30', (yellow card) 59'; Al-Rubaie (yellow card) 47'; Al-Qaydhi (yellow card) 51'; Hawsawi (yellow card) 81'; Vítor (yellow card) 90+10'	Report	Djaniny 26'; Bendebka 49' (pen.); Batna 82' (pen.); Al-Aqidi (yellow card) 89'; Al-Othman (yellow card) 90+10'	Stadium: Prince Hathloul bin Abdulaziz Sports City; Attendance: 817; Referee: Majed Al-Shamrani

2 March 2025 23	Al-Ittihad	1–1	Al-Okhdood	Jeddah
22:00	Aouar 39'	Report	Godwin (yellow card) 29'; Petros (yellow card) 56'; Asiri (yellow card) 75'; Bassogog 90+7'	Stadium: Alinma Stadium; Attendance: 45,772; Referee: Jesús Valenzuela (Venezuela)

8 March 2025 24	Al-Riyadh	1–0	Al-Okhdood	Riyadh
22:00	Al-Aqel (yellow card) 17'; Al-Khaibari (yellow card) 56'; Lega 85'; Sali (yellow card) 90+7'	Report	Pedroza (yellow card) 62'	Stadium: Prince Faisal bin Fahd Sports City Stadium; Attendance: 339; Referee: Shukri Al-Hanfoush

15 March 2025 25	Al-Okhdood	2–1	Al-Ahli	Najran
22:00	Al-Saeed (yellow card) 32'; Vítor (yellow card) 52'; Musona (yellow card) 71'; Pedroza (yellow card) 84'; Petros (yellow card) 90+4'; Al Abbas 90+5', (yellow card) 90+6'; Godwin 90+9'	Report	Lowe 28' (o.g.); Majrashi (yellow card) 59'; Hamed (yellow card) 90+3'; Kessié (yellow card) 90+7'; Al-Nabit (yellow card) 90+7'	Stadium: Prince Hathloul bin Abdulaziz Sports City; Attendance: 2,573; Referee: Anastasios Sidiropoulos (Greece)

4 April 2025 26	Al-Orobah	0–1	Al-Okhdood	Sakakah
17:45	Tello (yellow card) 79'	Report	Godwin 24'; Lowe (yellow card) 53'	Stadium: Al Jouf University Stadium; Attendance: 650; Referee: Andris Treimanis (Latvia)

11 April 2025 27	Al-Okhdood	1–1	Al-Taawoun	Najran
18:55	Bassogog 7'; Petros (yellow card) 77'	Report	Al-Mufarrij (yellow card) 24'; Al-Farhan (yellow card) 45+5'; Fajr (yellow card) 53'; Mandash 79'	Stadium: Prince Hathloul bin Abdulaziz Sports City; Attendance: 804; Referee: Sebastian Gishamer (Austria)

17 April 2025 28	Al-Shabab	0–0	Al-Okhdood	Riyadh
18:50	Hamdallah (yellow card) 45+3'; Al-Juwayr (yellow card) 45+3'; Al-Thani (yellow card) 51'	Report	Petros (yellow card) 15'; Asiri (yellow card) 73'; Al Abbas (yellow card) 85'	Stadium: Al-Shabab Club Stadium; Attendance: 2,699; Referee: Majed Al-Shamrani

23 April 2025 29	Al-Kholood	0–1	Al-Okhdood	Ar Rass
19:10	Dieng (yellow card) 6'	Report	Godwin 67', (yellow card) 68'; Musona (yellow card) 89'; Hawsawi (yellow card) 90+6'	Stadium: Al-Hazem Club Stadium; Attendance: 3,260; Referee: Nikola Dabanović (Montenegro)

1 May 2025 30	Al-Okhdood	1–2	Al-Wehda	Najran
19:00	Barry 50'	Report	Makki (yellow card) 44'; Al Makahasi 55'; Noor 75'	Stadium: Prince Hathloul bin Abdulaziz Sports City; Attendance: 1,498; Referee: Sven Jablonski (Germany)

12 May 2025 31	Al-Okhdood	0–9	Al-Nassr	Najran
21:00	Vítor (red card) 47'	Report	Yahya 16'; Durán 20', 52'; Brozović 27', (yellow card) 68'; Al-Sulaiheem (yellow card) 42'; Mané 45+6' (pen.), 59', 64', 74'; Maran 90+4' (pen.)	Stadium: Prince Hathloul bin Abdulaziz Sports City; Attendance: 3,861; Referee: Anastasios Sidiropoulos (Greece)

17 May 2025 32	Al-Fayha	2–0	Al-Okhdood	Al Majma'ah
19:15	Al-Rashidi (yellow card) 70'; López 87'; Sakala 90+2'	Report	Al-Rubaie (yellow card) 57'	Stadium: Al Majma'ah Sports City; Attendance: 1,833; Referee: Sergey Ivanov (Russia)

22 May 2025 33	Al-Okhdood	1–0	Al-Raed	Najran
19:05	Godwin 56'; Pedroza (yellow card) 81'; Barry (yellow card) 83'	Report	A. Hazazi (yellow card) 67'; Al-Sayil (yellow card) 90+7'	Stadium: Prince Hathloul bin Abdulaziz Sports City; Attendance: 867; Referee: Darío Herrera (Argentina)

26 May 2025 34	Al-Khaleej	2–3	Al-Okhdood	Dammam
21:00	Fortounis 47', 60'; Kourbelis (yellow card) 53'; Al-Samiri (yellow card) 90+4'	Report	Al-Qaydhi 65'; Al-Zabdani (yellow card) 88'; Al Abbas 90+5'; Al Jahif 90+15' (pen.), (yellow card) 90+15'; Al-Zubaidi (yellow card) 90+17'	Stadium: Prince Mohamed bin Fahd Stadium; Attendance: 1,086; Referee: Khalid Al-Turais

=== King Cup ===
All times are local, AST (UTC+3).

22 September 2024 Round of 32	Al-Okhdood	1–2	Al-Arabi	Najran
21:00	Lowe (yellow card) 25', (red card) 76'; Al Hatila 88'	Report	Quioto 8', 10'; Dagarshawi (yellow card) 13'; Abo Yabes (yellow card) 68'; Traoré (yellow card) 90+6'	Stadium: Prince Hathloul bin Abdulaziz Sports City; Referee: Mohammed Al-Ghamdi

== Statistics ==
=== Appearances ===
Last updated on 26 May 2025.

No.	Pos	Nat	Player	Total		Pro League		King Cup	
No.	Pos	Nat	Player	Apps	Goals	Apps	Goals	Apps	Goals
Goalkeepers
1	GK	(Saudi Arabia) KSA	Rakan Al-Najjar	4	0	2+1	0	1	0
28	GK	(Brazil) BRA	Paulo Vítor	32	0	32	0	0	0
92	GK	(Saudi Arabia) KSA	Saad Al-Qarni	0	0	0	0	0	0
Defenders
2	DF	(Saudi Arabia) KSA	Mohammed Al-Saeed	18	0	13+5	0	0	0
4	DF	(Saudi Arabia) KSA	Saeed Al-Rubaie	27	1	27	1	0	0
8	DF	(Saudi Arabia) KSA	Hussain Al-Zabdani	21	0	6+14	0	1	0
15	DF	(Saudi Arabia) KSA	Naif Asiri	30	1	25+4	1	1	0
16	DF	(Brazil) BRA	Diego Ferreira	11	0	4+6	0	0+1	0
17	DF	(Jamaica) JAM	Damion Lowe	23	0	22	0	1	0
27	DF	(Saudi Arabia) KSA	Awadh Khamis	31	0	27+3	0	0+1	0
87	DF	(Saudi Arabia) KSA	Ghassan Hawsawi	12	0	7+5	0	0	0
98	DF	(Saudi Arabia) KSA	Muhannad Al-Qaydhi	27	1	19+7	1	0+1	0
Midfielders
11	MF	(Zimbabwe) ZIM	Knowledge Musona	30	5	21+9	5	0	0
12	MF	(Saudi Arabia) KSA	Abdulaziz Al Hatila	21	1	5+15	0	1	1
18	MF	(Colombia) COL	Sebastián Pedroza	32	1	31	1	0+1	0
19	MF	(Saudi Arabia) KSA	Saud Salem	7	0	2+4	0	1	0
20	MF	(Saudi Arabia) KSA	Saleh Al-Harthi	8	0	0+7	0	1	0
26	MF	(Saudi Arabia) KSA	Yaseen Al-Zubaidi	15	0	8+7	0	0	0
29	MF	(Saudi Arabia) KSA	Ahmed Al Daghrir	0	0	0	0	0	0
66	MF	(Brazil) BRA	Petros	26	0	24+1	0	1	0
77	MF	(Saudi Arabia) KSA	Saif Balhareth	1	0	0+1	0	0	0
Forwards
7	FW	(Guinea) GUI	Ousmane Barry	16	1	11+5	1	0	0
10	FW	(Nigeria) NGR	Saviour Godwin	31	7	28+3	7	0	0
13	FW	(Cameroon) CMR	Christian Bassogog	32	6	31+1	6	0	0
14	FW	(Saudi Arabia) KSA	Saleh Al Abbas	26	3	5+21	3	0	0
21	FW	(Saudi Arabia) KSA	Mohammed Al Jahif	21	2	3+17	2	1	0
64	FW	(Egypt) EGY	Karim Ashraf	2	0	0+2	0	0	0
Player who made an appearance this season but left the club
6	MF	(Saudi Arabia) KSA	Eid Al-Muwallad	14	0	10+3	0	1	0
9	FW	(Mali) MLI	Ibrahima Koné	15	3	11+3	3	1	0

=== Goalscorers ===
Rank	No.	Pos	Nat	Name	Pro League	King Cup	Total
1	10	FW	(Nigeria)	Saviour Godwin	7	0	7
2	13	FW	(Cameroon)	Christian Bassogog	6	0	6
3	11	MF	(Zimbabwe)	Knowledge Musona	5	0	5
4	9	FW	(Mali)	Ibrahima Koné	3	0	3
4	14	FW	(Saudi Arabia)	Saleh Al Abbas	3	0	3
6	21	FW	(Saudi Arabia)	Mohammed Al Jahif	2	0	2
7	4	DF	(Saudi Arabia)	Saeed Al-Rubaie	1	0	1
7	7	FW	(Guinea)	Ousmane Barry	1	0	1
7	12	MF	(Saudi Arabia)	Abdulaziz Al Hatila	0	1	1
7	15	DF	(Saudi Arabia)	Naif Asiri	1	0	1
7	18	MF	(Colombia)	Sebastián Pedroza	1	0	1
7	98	DF	(Saudi Arabia)	Muhannad Al-Qaydhi	1	0	1
Own goal					2	0	2
Total					33	1	34

Last Updated: 26 May 2025

=== Assists ===
Rank	No.	Pos	Nat	Name	Pro League	King Cup	Total
1	10	FW	(Nigeria)	Saviour Godwin	4	0	4
2	11	MF	(Zimbabwe)	Knowledge Musona	3	0	3
3	7	FW	(Guinea)	Ousmane Barry	2	0	2
3	18	MF	(Colombia)	Sebastián Pedroza	2	0	2
3	27	DF	(Saudi Arabia)	Awadh Khamis	2	0	2
6	8	DF	(Saudi Arabia)	Hussain Al-Zabdani	1	0	1
6	9	FW	(Mali)	Ibrahima Koné	1	0	1
6	13	FW	(Cameroon)	Christian Bassogog	1	0	1
6	17	DF	(Jamaica)	Damion Lowe	1	0	1
6	66	MF	(Brazil)	Petros	1	0	1
Total					18	0	18

Last Updated: 26 May 2025

=== Clean sheets ===
Rank	No.	Pos	Nat	Name	Pro League	King Cup	Total
1	28	GK	(Brazil)	Paulo Vítor	7	0	7
2	1	GK	(Saudi Arabia)	Rakan Al-Najjar	1	0	1
Total					8	0	8

Last Updated: 22 May 2025
