= 2023–24 Al-Okhdood Club season =

Al-Okhdood
2023–24 season
- President: Sami Al Fadhel
- Manager: Jorge Mendonça (until 10 November); Martin Ševela (from 10 November until 17 April); Noureddine Zekri (from 17 April)
- Stadium: Prince Hathloul bin Abdul Aziz Sports City
- SPL: 15th
- King Cup: Round of 32 (knocked out by Al-Fateh)
- Top goalscorer: League: Andrei Burcă; Saviour Godwin (6 goals each); All: Andrei Burcă; Saviour Godwin (6 goals each)
- Highest home attendance: 7,585 (vs. Al-Hilal, 7 October 2023)
- Lowest home attendance: 439 (vs. Al-Tai, 14 December 2023)
- Average home league attendance: 2,243
- All statistics correct as of 27 May 2024.

The 2023–24 season was Al-Okhdood's 48th year in existence and their first ever season in the Pro League following their promotion from the FDL in the previous season. The club participated in the Pro League and the King Cup.

The season covers the period from 1 July 2023 to 30 June 2024.

== Players ==
=== Squad information ===
As of 1 February 2024

Note: Flags indicate national team as defined under FIFA eligibility rules; some limited exceptions apply. Players may hold more than one non-FIFA nationality.

| No. | Pos. | Nation | Player |
|---|---|---|---|
| 1 | GK | BRA | Paulo Vítor |
| 2 | DF | KSA | Abdulrahman Al-Rio |
| 3 | DF | ROU | Andrei Burcă |
| 4 | DF | KSA | Saeed Al-Rubaie (on loan from Al-Shabab) |
| 5 | DF | GEO | Solomon Kvirkvelia |
| 6 | MF | KSA | Eid Al-Muwallad |
| 7 | MF | KSA | Saleh Al-Harthi |
| 8 | DF | KSA | Hussain Al-Zabdani |
| 9 | FW | CMR | Léandre Tawamba |
| 10 | MF | ROU | Florin Tănase |
| 11 | MF | ESP | Álex Collado (on loan from Real Betis) |
| 12 | MF | KSA | Abdulaziz Al Hotailah |
| 13 | MF | KSA | Mesleh Al-Shaikh |
| 14 | MF | EGY | Ahmed Mostafa (on loan from Smouha) |
| 15 | DF | KSA | Naif Asiri |

| No. | Pos. | Nation | Player |
|---|---|---|---|
| 17 | MF | KSA | Sharfi Al Saleem |
| 18 | MF | COL | Sebastián Pedroza (on loan from Santa Fe) |
| 19 | MF | KSA | Saud Salem |
| 20 | DF | KSA | Hamad Al Mansour (on loan from Al-Nassr) |
| 21 | FW | KSA | Mohammed Naif |
| 23 | GK | KSA | Hussain Shae'an |
| 24 | FW | KSA | Mourad Khodari (on loan from Al-Ahli) |
| 25 | GK | KSA | Abdulaziz Al-Awairdhi (on loan from Al-Nassr) |
| 27 | MF | KSA | Awadh Khamis |
| 29 | MF | KSA | Yaseen Al-Zubaidi (on loan from Al-Ahli) |
| 30 | GK | KSA | Saad Al-Saleh |
| 49 | MF | KSA | Rayan Hattan |
| 77 | MF | KSA | Hassan Al-Habib |
| 99 | FW | NGR | Saviour Godwin |

== Transfers and loans ==
=== Transfers in ===
| Entry date | Position | No. | Player | From club | Fee | Ref. |
|---|---|---|---|---|---|---|
| 1 July 2023 | GK | 1 | (Brazil) Paulo Vítor | (Portugal) Chaves | Free | |
| 1 July 2023 | GK | 23 | (Saudi Arabia) Hussain Shae'an | (Saudi Arabia) Al-Shabab | Free | |
| 1 July 2023 | DF | 27 | (Saudi Arabia) Awadh Khamis | (Saudi Arabia) Al-Raed | Free | |
| 15 July 2023 | DF | 5 | (Georgia (country)) Solomon Kvirkvelia | (Azerbaijan) Neftçi | Free | |
| 17 July 2023 | DF | 3 | (Romania) Andrei Burcă | (Romania) CFR Cluj | $1,100,000 | |
| 21 July 2023 | DF | 2 | (Saudi Arabia) Abdulrahman Al-Rio | (Saudi Arabia) Al-Faisaly | Free | |
| 5 August 2023 | MF | 10 | (Romania) Florin Tănase | (United Arab Emirates) Al Jazira | Free | |
| 19 August 2023 | MF | 77 | (Saudi Arabia) Hassan Al-Habib | (Saudi Arabia) Al-Fateh | Free | |
| 31 August 2023 | FW | 9 | (Cameroon) Léandre Tawamba | (Saudi Arabia) Al-Taawoun | Free | |
| 7 September 2023 | FW | 99 | (Nigeria) Saviour Godwin | (Portugal) Casa Pia | $2,675,000 | |
| 1 February 2024 | GK | 30 | (Saudi Arabia) Saad Al-Saleh | (Saudi Arabia) Al-Ain | Free | |
| 1 February 2024 | MF | 49 | (Saudi Arabia) Rayan Hattan | (Saudi Arabia) Al-Entesar | Free | |

=== Loans in ===
| Start date | End date | Position | No. | Player | From club | Fee | Ref. |
|---|---|---|---|---|---|---|---|
| 1 July 2023 | End of season | DF | 20 | (Saudi Arabia) Hamad Al Mansour | (Saudi Arabia) Al-Nassr | None | |
| 1 July 2023 | End of season | MF | 18 | (Colombia) Sebastián Pedroza | (Colombia) Santa Fe | None | |
| 4 July 2023 | End of season | GK | 25 | (Saudi Arabia) Abdulaziz Al-Awairdhi | (Saudi Arabia) Al-Nassr | None | |
| 21 July 2023 | End of season | MF | 14 | (Egypt) Ahmed Mostafa | (Egypt) Smouha | None | |
| 31 July 2023 | End of season | MF | 11 | (Spain) Álex Collado | (Spain) Real Betis | None | |
| 19 August 2023 | End of season | DF | 4 | (Saudi Arabia) Saeed Al-Rubaie | (Saudi Arabia) Al-Shabab | None | |
| 31 August 2023 | End of season | FW | 24 | (Saudi Arabia) Mourad Khodari | (Saudi Arabia) Al-Ahli | None | |
| 1 February 2024 | End of season | MF | 29 | (Saudi Arabia) Yaseen Al-Zubaidi | (Saudi Arabia) Al-Ahli | None | |

=== Transfers out ===
| Exit date | Position | No. | Player | To club | Fee | Ref. |
|---|---|---|---|---|---|---|
| 30 June 2023 | DF | 17 | (Saudi Arabia) Aseel Abed | (Saudi Arabia) Al-Ittihad | End of loan | |
| 30 June 2023 | DF | 99 | (Saudi Arabia) Aser Hawsawi | (Saudi Arabia) Al-Nassr | End of loan | |
| 30 June 2023 | FW | 77 | (Saudi Arabia) Sultan Hawsawi | (Saudi Arabia) Al-Wehda | End of loan | |
| 1 July 2023 | DF | 3 | (Brazil) Reinaldo Dutra | (Saudi Arabia) Al-Safa | Free | |
| 1 July 2023 | DF | 4 | (Saudi Arabia) Hussain Al-Mosaabi | (Saudi Arabia) Al-Adalah | Free | |
| 1 July 2023 | DF | 26 | (Saudi Arabia) Mohammed Reeman | (Saudi Arabia) Al-Najma | Free | |
| 1 July 2023 | DF | 70 | (Saudi Arabia) Ahmed Al-Muwallad | (Saudi Arabia) Al-Arabi | Free | |
| 1 July 2023 | MF | 5 | (Brazil) Maicon Douglas | (Saudi Arabia) Al-Safa | Free | |
| 1 July 2023 | MF | 12 | (Brazil) Kaká Mendes | (Saudi Arabia) Al-Safa | Free | |
| 1 July 2023 | FW | 7 | (Saudi Arabia) Saleh Al Jomhoor | (Saudi Arabia) Najran | Free | |
| 1 July 2023 | FW | 9 | (Guinea) Ousmane Barry | (Saudi Arabia) Al-Najma | Free | |
| 1 July 2023 | FW | 30 | (Tunisia) Borhen Hkimi | (Saudi Arabia) Al-Safa | Free | |
| 5 July 2023 | GK | 1 | (Portugal) Vladimir Stojković | (Saudi Arabia) Al-Faisaly | Free | |
| 13 July 2023 | DF | 2 | (Saudi Arabia) Khaled Al-Maghrabi | (Saudi Arabia) Al-Zulfi | Free | |
| 13 August 2023 | GK | 34 | (Saudi Arabia) Naif Al-Bedidi | (Saudi Arabia) Wej | Free | |
| 28 August 2023 | MF | 24 | (Saudi Arabia) Mubarak Al-Sagoor | (Saudi Arabia) Najran | Free | |
| 20 September 2023 | MF | 14 | (Saudi Arabia) Jalawy Al-Yami | (Saudi Arabia) Najran | Free | |
| 16 October 2023 | MF | 66 | (Saudi Arabia) Musaad Awadh | (Saudi Arabia) Sharurah | Free | |
| 29 October 2023 | GK | 22 | (Saudi Arabia) Mubarak Al-Najrani | (Saudi Arabia) Qilwah | Free | |

== Pre-season ==
| 23 July 2023 Friendly | Al-Okhdood (Saudi Arabia) | 1–1 | (Egypt) Orange Sport | Cairo, Egypt |
| 17:00 EEST | Burcă | | | Stadium: The Guard Hotel Stadium |

| 24 July 2023 Friendly | Al-Okhdood (Saudi Arabia) | 2–0 | (Egypt) El Raja | Cairo, Egypt |
| 17:00 EEST | Salem; Al-Rio | Report | | Stadium: The Guard Hotel Stadium |

| 27 July 2023 Friendly | Al-Okhdood (Saudi Arabia) | 2–0 | (United Arab Emirates) Khor Fakkan | Cairo, Egypt |
| EEST | Burcă (pen.); Mostafa (pen.) | Report | | Stadium: The Guard Hotel Stadium |

| 29 July 2023 Friendly | Al-Okhdood (Saudi Arabia) | 1–5 | (Saudi Arabia) Al-Qaisumah | 6th of October, Egypt |
| 18:00 EEST | | | | Stadium: Dreamland Golf Stadium |

| 30 July 2023 Friendly | Al-Okhdood (Saudi Arabia) | 4–0 | (Egypt) Ismaily | Cairo, Egypt |
| EEST | Al-Shaikh; Al-Harthi; Naif, | | | Stadium: The Guard Hotel Stadium |

| 6 August 2023 Friendly | Al-Okhdood (Saudi Arabia) | 4–0 | (Saudi Arabia) Abha | Abha, Saudi Arabia |
| 18:00 AST | Mostafa; Al-Harthi, Al-Rio | Report | | Stadium: Abha Club Stadium |

== Competitions ==
=== Overview ===
| Competition | Record | | | | | | | |
| Competition | G | W | D | L | GF | GA | GD | Win % |
|---|---|---|---|---|---|---|---|---|
| Pro League | 34 | 9 | 6 | 19 | 33 | 52 | −19 | 26.47 |
| King Cup | 1 | 0 | 0 | 1 | 1 | 3 | −2 | 0.00 |
| Total | 35 | 9 | 6 | 20 | 34 | 55 | −21 | 25.71 |

Updated to match played 27 May 2024
Source: Competitions

=== Pro League ===
==== League table ====
| Pos | Team | Pld | W | D | L | GF | GA | GD | Pts | Qualification or relegation |
|---|---|---|---|---|---|---|---|---|---|---|
| 13 | Al-Wehda | 34 | 10 | 6 | 18 | 45 | 60 | −15 | 36 | |
| 14 | Al-Riyadh | 34 | 8 | 11 | 15 | 33 | 57 | −24 | 35 | |
| 15 | Al-Okhdood | 34 | 9 | 6 | 19 | 33 | 52 | −19 | 33 | |
| 16 | Abha (R) | 34 | 9 | 5 | 20 | 38 | 87 | −49 | 32 | Relegation to Yelo League |
| 17 | Al-Tai (R) | 34 | 8 | 7 | 19 | 34 | 64 | −30 | 31 | Relegation to Yelo League |

Source: SPL
Rules for classification: 1) Points; 2) Head-to-head points; 3) Head-to-head goal difference; 4) Total goal difference; 5) Total goals scored; 6) Fair-play points
(Note: Head-to-head record is used only after all the matches between the teams in question have been played).
(R) Relegated

==== Results summary ====
| Overall | | | | | | | | Home | | | | | | Away | | | | | |
| Pld | W | D | L | GF | GA | GD | Pts | W | D | L | GF | GA | GD | W | D | L | GF | GA | GD |
|---|---|---|---|---|---|---|---|---|---|---|---|---|---|---|---|---|---|---|---|
| 34 | 9 | 6 | 19 | 33 | 52 | −19 | 33 | 6 | 1 | 10 | 20 | 25 | −5 | 3 | 5 | 9 | 13 | 27 | −14 |

Last updated: 27 May 2024.
Source: spl.com.sa

==== Results by round ====
| Round | 1 | 2 | 3 | 4 | 5 | 6 | 7 | 8 | 9 | 10 | 11 | 12 | 13 | 14 | 15 | 16 | 17 | 18 | 19 | 20 | 21 | 22 | 23 | 24 | 25 | 26 | 27 | 28 | 29 | 30 | 31 | 32 | 33 | 34 |
|---|---|---|---|---|---|---|---|---|---|---|---|---|---|---|---|---|---|---|---|---|---|---|---|---|---|---|---|---|---|---|---|---|---|---|
| Ground | A | H | A | H | A | H | H | A | H | H | A | A | H | A | H | A | H | H | A | H | A | H | A | A | H | A | A | H | H | A | H | A | H | A |
| Result | D | L | L | L | W | L | L | W | L | L | L | L | W | L | W | L | W | W | D | W | L | L | L | D | L | L | L | L | W | D | L | D | D | W |
| Position | 11 | 14 | 15 | 18 | 13 | 14 | 15 | 13 | 14 | 14 | 16 | 16 | 16 | 16 | 15 | 16 | 14 | 12 | 12 | 11 | 13 | 13 | 14 | 14 | 15 | 15 | 16 | 17 | 15 | 15 | 16 | 16 | 17 | 15 |

Updated to match(es) played on 27 May 2024. Source: spl.com.sa
A = Away; H = Home; W = Win; D = Draw; L = Loss

==== Matches ====
All times are local, AST (UTC+3).

Win Draw Loss Postponed

| 14 August 2023 1 | Al-Shabab | 1–1 | Al-Okhdood | Riyadh |
| 21:00 | Santos (yellow card) 63'; Abdu 66'; Al-Sibyani (yellow card) 90+6' | Report | Burcă 41' (pen.); Khamis (yellow card) 68'; Pedroza (yellow card) 88' | Stadium: Prince Faisal bin Fahd Stadium; Attendance: 1,974; Referee: Majed Al-Shamrani |

| 18 August 2023 2 | Al-Okhdood | 1–3 | Al-Fateh | Najran |
| 18:00 | Tănase (yellow card) 9', (goal) 23'; Al-Shaikh (yellow card) 29'; Collado (yellow card) 54' (yellow-red card) 71' | Report | Batna 36'; Tello 45+2' (pen.), 90+2'; Al-Yousef (yellow card) 45+7' | Stadium: Prince Hathloul bin Abdul Aziz Sports City; Attendance: 1,255; Referee: Abdullah Al-Shehri |

| 24 August 2023 3 | Al-Ahli | 1–0 | Al-Okhdood | Jeddah |
| 21:00 | Kessié 90+6' | Report | Al-Muwallad (yellow card) 35'; Al-Zabdani (yellow card) 54' | Stadium: Prince Abdullah Al Faisal Stadium; Attendance: 23,100; Referee: Mohammed Al-Hoaish |

| 29 August 2023 4 | Al-Okhdood | 0–1 | Al-Taawoun | Najran |
| 18:00 | Al Saleem (yellow card) 81'; Al-Zabdani (yellow card) 87'; Al-Muwallad (yellow card) 90+1' | Report | Castro 45+9'; Girotto (yellow card) 55'; Al-Abdulrazzaq (yellow card) 90+5' | Stadium: Prince Hathloul bin Abdul Aziz Sports City; Attendance: 1,520; Referee: Mamdouh Al Shahdan |

| 1 September 2023 5 | Al-Riyadh | 0–1 | Al-Okhdood | Riyadh |
| 21:00 | | Report | Tawamba 55'; Tănase (yellow card) 90+2' | Stadium: Prince Faisal bin Fahd Stadium; Attendance: 133; Referee: Sami Al-Jires |

| 14 September 2023 6 | Al-Okhdood | 0–1 | Al-Ittihad | Najran |
| 18:00 | Al-Muwallad (yellow card) 69' | Report | Benzema 72' | Stadium: Prince Hathloul bin Abdul Aziz Sports City; Attendance: 6,971; Referee: Piero Maza (Chile) |

| 22 September 2023 7 | Al-Okhdood | 0–1 | Al-Khaleej | Najran |
| 18:00 | Al-Harthi (yellow card) 83'; Tănase (yellow card) 90' | Report | Jung Woo-young (yellow card) 57'; Narey 60' (pen.); Al-Samiri (yellow card) 79'; Šehić (yellow card) 86' | Stadium: Prince Hathloul bin Abdul Aziz Sports City; Attendance: 887; Referee: Mohammed Al-Harbi |

| 30 September 2023 8 | Al-Raed | 1–2 | Al-Okhdood | Buraidah |
| 18:00 | El Berkaoui 29'; Loum (yellow card) 66'; Hazazi (yellow card) 90+8' | Report | Burcă (yellow card) 4', (goal) 83' (pen.); Godwin 21', (yellow card) 63'; Al-Muwallad (yellow card) 77' | Stadium: King Abdullah Sport City Stadium; Attendance: 1,618; Referee: Shukri Al-Hanfoush |

| 7 October 2023 9 | Al-Okhdood | 0–3 | Al-Hilal | Najran |
| 18:00 | Al Saleem (yellow card) 27'; Al-Rubaie (yellow card) 45+1' (yellow-red card) 45+4'; Burcă (yellow card) 81' | Report | Michael 10'; Neves (yellow card) 41'; Milinković-Savić 71', 83' | Stadium: Prince Hathloul bin Abdul Aziz Sports City; Attendance: 7,585; Referee: Halil Umut Meler (Turkey) |

| 20 October 2023 10 | Al-Okhdood | 1–2 | Al-Fayha | Najran |
| 18:00 | Godwin 45+4' | Report | Onyekuru 29'; Sakala 66' | Stadium: Prince Hathloul bin Abdul Aziz Sports City; Attendance: 792; Referee: Abdulrahman Al-Sultan |

| 26 October 2023 11 | Damac | 2–0 | Al-Okhdood | Khamis Mushait |
| 18:00 | Al-Zain 48'; Nkoudou 69'; Al-Anazi (yellow card) 79'; Hamed (yellow card) 90+6' | Report | Tawamba (yellow card) 36'; Khamis (yellow card) 57'; Tănase (yellow card) 62' | Stadium: Damac Club Stadium; Attendance: 1,614; Referee: Faisal Al-Blwi |

| 4 November 2023 12 | Abha | 3–2 | Al-Okhdood | Abha |
| 18:00 | Krychowiak 20'; Kvirkvelia 59' (o.g.); Toko Ekambi 69' | Report | Al-Rubaie (yellow card) 23'; Burcă 26'; Al-Shaikh 31'; Al-Harthi (yellow card) 84'; Al Mansour (yellow card) 89' | Stadium: Prince Sultan bin Abdul Aziz Stadium; Attendance: 370; Referee: Sami Al-Jires |

| 11 November 2023 13 | Al-Okhdood | 2–1 | Al-Hazem | Najran |
| 18:00 | Tawamba 20', 90+3'; Al Mansour (yellow card) 25', (red card) 63'; Pedroza (yellow card) 45+2'; Al-Rubaie (yellow card) 90+11' | Report | Traoré (yellow card) 45+4'; Selemani (yellow card) 69'; T. Al-Absi (yellow card) 78'; Tozé 90+7' | Stadium: Prince Hathloul bin Abdul Aziz Sports City; Attendance: 588; Referee: Matthew Conger (New Zealand) |

| 24 November 2023 14 | Al-Nassr | 3–0 | Al-Okhdood | Riyadh |
| 21:00 | Al-Najei 13'; Ronaldo 77', 80' | Report | Tănase (yellow card) 26'; Tawamba (yellow card) 34'; Al-Harthi (yellow card) 78' | Stadium: Al-Awwal Park; Attendance: 21,752; Referee: Faisal Al-Blwi |

| 1 December 2023 15 | Al-Okhdood | 1–0 | Al-Ettifaq | Najran |
| 18:00 | Al-Harthi (yellow card) 5'; Tănase (yellow card) 37'; Burcă 73' | Report | Abdulrahman (yellow card) 56' | Stadium: Prince Hathloul bin Abdul Aziz Sports City; Attendance: 908; Referee: Andris Treimanis (Latvia) |

| 9 December 2023 16 | Al-Wehda | 2–0 | Al-Okhdood | Mecca |
| 21:00 | Noor 16'; Al-Akouz (yellow card) 69'; Duarte 84' | 2023–24 Al-Okhdood Club season#Pre-season | Burcă (yellow card) 29'; Vítor (red card) 90+4' | Stadium: King Abdul Aziz Stadium; Attendance: 575; Referee: Khaled Al-Teris |

| 14 December 2023 17 | Al-Okhdood | 1–0 | Al-Tai | Najran |
| 18:00 | Al-Muwallad (yellow card) 38'; Tănase 56'; Al-Rubaie (yellow card) 65' | Report | | Stadium: Prince Hathloul bin Abdul Aziz Sports City; Attendance: 439; Referee: Mohammed Al-Harbi |

| 22 December 2023 18 | Al-Okhdood | 1–0 | Al-Shabab | Najran |
| 18:00 | Godwin 3'; Kvirkvelia (yellow card) 45+1'; Tănase (yellow card) 47'; Burcă (red card) 70' | Report | Al-Sadi (red card) 55' | Stadium: Prince Hathloul bin Abdul Aziz Sports City; Attendance: 1,449; Referee: Andrei Chivulete (Romania) |

| 30 December 2023 19 | Al-Fateh | 0–0 | Al-Okhdood | Al-Hasa |
| 18:00 | Baattia (yellow card) 34'; Al-Fuhaid (yellow card) 74' | Report | Al-Muwallad (yellow card) 10'; Al-Zabdani (yellow card) 43'; Tawamba (yellow card) 62'; Al-Harthi (yellow card) 74' | Stadium: Al-Fateh Club Stadium; Attendance: 5,973; Referee: Majed Al-Shamrani |

| 16 February 2024 20 | Al-Okhdood | 3–2 | Al-Ahli | Najran |
| 20:00 | Collado 25'; Al Mansour 43'; Tawamba 59'; Godwin (yellow card) 82'; Al-Muwallad (yellow card) 89' | Report | Kvirkvelia 32' (o.g.); Firmino 45+3' (pen.); Ibañez (yellow card) 86' (yellow-red card) 90+5' | Stadium: Prince Hathloul bin Abdul Aziz Sports City; Attendance: 4,391; Referee: Kirill Levnikov (Russia) |

| 23 February 2024 21 | Al-Taawoun | 3–1 | Al-Okhdood | Buraidah |
| 17:00 | Barrow 7'; Adam 10'; Flávio (yellow card) 38'; Bahusayn (yellow card) 83'; Al-Kuwaykibi 86' | Report | Vítor (yellow card) 30'; Al-Rubaie 57'; Tănase (yellow card) 68' | Stadium: Al-Taawoun Club Stadium; Attendance: 3,883; Referee: Sebastían Zunino (Argentine) |

| 1 March 2024 22 | Al-Okhdood | 1–2 | Al-Riyadh | Najran |
| 17:00 | Godwin 74'; Pedroza (yellow card) 80' | Report | Musona 45+1'; Al Abbas (yellow card) 80'; Gray 87'; Al-Aqel (yellow card) 90+6' | Stadium: Prince Hathloul bin Abdul Aziz Sports City; Attendance: 828; Referee: Urs Schnyder (Switzerland) |

| 8 March 2024 23 | Al-Ittihad | 2–1 | Al-Okhdood | Jeddah |
| 20:00 | Felipe (yellow card) 28'; Al Mousa 45'; Kanté (yellow card) 60'; Haji 83' | Report | Collado 63'; Pedroza (yellow card) 70' | Stadium: Prince Abdullah Al Faisal Stadium; Attendance: 8,944; Referee: Yael Falcón Pérez (Argentina) |

| 14 March 2024 24 | Al-Khaleej | 2–2 | Al-Okhdood | Dammam |
| 22:00 | Al Salem 3', (yellow card) 52'; Jung Woo-young (yellow card) 24'; Al Hamsal 28'; Martins (yellow card) 90+5' | Report | Burcă 53' (pen.); Collado 58'; Al-Rubaie (yellow card) 76' | Stadium: Prince Mohamed bin Fahd Stadium; Attendance: 3,055; Referee: Mohammed Al-Hoaish |

| 29 March 2024 25 | Al-Okhdood | 1–3 | Al-Raed | Najran |
| 22:00 | Burcă 20' (pen.); Vítor (yellow card) 28'; Pedroza (yellow card) 55'; Al-Muwallad (yellow card) 90+7' | Report | El Berkaoui 15', (yellow card) 81'; Fouzair 31'; Tavares 56' | Stadium: Prince Hathloul bin Abdul Aziz Sports City; Attendance: 576; Referee: Shukri Al-Hanfoush |

| 2 April 2024 26 | Al-Hilal | 3–0 | Al-Okhdood | Riyadh |
| 22:00 | Al-Shehri 16'; Malcom (yellow card) 65', (goal) 66'; S. Al-Dawsari 73' | Report | Al Jahif (yellow card) 56' | Stadium: Kingdom Arena; Attendance: 16,358; Referee: Bastian Dankert (Germany) |

| 7 April 2024 27 | Al-Fayha | 3–0 | Al-Okhdood | Al Majma'ah |
| 22:00 | Sakala 16', 55'; Al-Baqawi (yellow card) 45+1'; Sabiri 88' | Report | Al-Rubaie (yellow card) 22' | Stadium: Al Majma'ah Sports City; Attendance: 294; Referee: Abdullah Al-Harbi |

| 20 April 2024 28 | Al-Okhdood | 1–2 | Damac | Najran |
| 18:00 | Al-Zabdani (yellow card) 17'; Al-Rubaie 47' | Report | Stanciu 10'; Al-Zain (yellow card) 22'; Antolić 37'; Hamed (yellow card) 71'; Al-Anazi (yellow card) 88' | Stadium: Prince Hathloul bin Abdul Aziz Sports City; Attendance: 560; Referee: Khaled Al-Teris |

| 27 April 2024 29 | Al-Okhdood | 4–0 | Abha | Najran |
| 18:00 | Pedroza (yellow card) 31', (goal) 74'; Kvirkvelia 40', (yellow card) 53'; Al-Zubaidi 47'; Al-Rubaie (yellow card) 56'; Al Hatila 90+3' | Report | Al-Zubaidi (yellow card) 50' | Stadium: Prince Hathloul bin Abdul Aziz Sports City; Attendance: 1,017; Referee: Mohammed Al-Hoaish |

| 2 May 2024 30 | Al-Hazem | 0–0 | Al-Okhdood | Ar Rass |
| 18:00 | Al-Thani (yellow card) 14'; Viana (yellow card) 45' | Report | Godwin (yellow card) 67'; Al-Habib (yellow card) 90+4' | Stadium: Al-Hazem Club Stadium; Attendance: 533; Referee: Shukri Al-Hanfoush |

| 9 May 2024 31 | Al-Okhdood | 2–3 | Al-Nassr | Najran |
| 21:00 | Al-Rubaie (yellow card) 23'; Al-Habib 60'; Godwin 70'; Collado (yellow card) 84' | Report | Brozović 7', 90+1'; Ronaldo 15', (yellow card) 81'; Yahya (yellow card) 76' | Stadium: Prince Hathloul bin Abdul Aziz Sports City; Attendance: 7,042; Referee: Faisal Al-Blwi |

| 17 May 2024 32 | Al-Ettifaq | 1–1 | Al-Okhdood | Dammam |
| 21:00 | Abdulrahman (red card) 16'; Dawran 86' | Report | Al Mansour (yellow card) 39'; Al-Zubaidi 48'; Al-Habib (yellow card) 79' | Stadium: Al-Ettifaq Club Stadium; Attendance: 4,826; Referee: Khaled Al-Teris |

| 23 May 2024 33 | Al-Okhdood | 1–1 | Al-Wehda | Najran |
| 21:00 | Collado 30'; Al-Rubaie (yellow card) 45'; Al Mansour (yellow card) 68'; Khamis (yellow card) 89'; Pedroza (yellow card) 90'; Asiri (yellow card) 90+13' | Report | Ighalo 12', (yellow card) 90+13'; Al-Hafith (yellow card) 60'; Anselmo (yellow card) 70'; Noor (yellow card) 73'; Al Hejji (yellow card) 83' | Stadium: Prince Hathloul bin Abdul Aziz Sports City; Attendance: 1,315; Referee: Mohammed Al-Hoaish |

| 27 May 2024 34 | Al-Tai | 0–2 | Al-Okhdood | Ha'il |
| 21:00 | Semedo (yellow card) 29'; Abdullah (yellow card) 39' | Report | Asiri (yellow card) 10'; Al-Zabdani (yellow card) 20'; Godwin 42'; Al-Zubaidi (yellow card) 45+3'; Tawamba 50'; Al-Muwallad (yellow card) 68' | Stadium: Prince Abdul Aziz bin Musa'ed Stadium; Attendance: 10,501; Referee: Khaled Al-Teris |

=== King Cup ===
All times are local, AST (UTC+3).

| 27 September 2023 Round of 32 | Al-Fateh | 3–1 | Al-Okhdood | Al-Hasa |
| 18:00 | Batna 7' (pen.), 90+7'; Al-Saeed (yellow card) 25'; Saâdane (yellow card) 74'; Djaniny 81' | Report | Al Saleem (yellow card) 41'; Al Jahif (yellow card) 47'; Al Mansour (yellow card) 66'; Khodari 90+1' | Stadium: Prince Abdullah bin Jalawi Stadium; Referee: Mohammed Al-Beredi |

== Statistics ==
=== Appearances ===
Last updated on 27 May 2024.

| No. | Pos | Nat | Player | Total | | Pro League | | King Cup | |
| No. | Pos | Nat | Player | Apps | Goals | Apps | Goals | Apps | Goals |
Goalkeepers
| 1 | GK | (Brazil) BRA | Paulo Vítor | 32 | 0 | 31 | 0 | 1 | 0 |
| 23 | GK | (Saudi Arabia) KSA | Hussain Shae'an | 0 | 0 | 0 | 0 | 0 | 0 |
| 25 | GK | (Saudi Arabia) KSA | Abdulaziz Al-Awairdhi | 3 | 0 | 3 | 0 | 0 | 0 |
| 30 | GK | (Saudi Arabia) KSA | Saad Al-Saleh | 0 | 0 | 0 | 0 | 0 | 0 |
Defenders
| 2 | DF | (Saudi Arabia) KSA | Abdulrahman Al-Rio | 5 | 0 | 0+4 | 0 | 1 | 0 |
| 3 | DF | (Romania) ROU | Andrei Burcă | 29 | 6 | 28 | 6 | 0+1 | 0 |
| 4 | DF | (Saudi Arabia) KSA | Saeed Al-Rubaie | 26 | 2 | 26 | 2 | 0 | 0 |
| 5 | DF | (Georgia (country)) GEO | Solomon Kvirkvelia | 34 | 1 | 32+1 | 1 | 1 | 0 |
| 8 | DF | (Saudi Arabia) KSA | Hussain Al-Zabdani | 29 | 0 | 25+3 | 0 | 1 | 0 |
| 15 | DF | (Saudi Arabia) KSA | Naif Asiri | 3 | 0 | 2+1 | 0 | 0 | 0 |
| 20 | DF | (Saudi Arabia) KSA | Hamad Al Mansour | 21 | 1 | 16+4 | 1 | 1 | 0 |
| 27 | DF | (Saudi Arabia) KSA | Awadh Khamis | 26 | 0 | 19+6 | 0 | 0+1 | 0 |
Midfielders
| 6 | MF | (Saudi Arabia) KSA | Eid Al-Muwallad | 27 | 0 | 23+4 | 0 | 0 | 0 |
| 7 | MF | (Saudi Arabia) KSA | Saleh Al-Harthi | 25 | 0 | 8+16 | 0 | 0+1 | 0 |
| 10 | MF | (Romania) ROU | Florin Tănase | 25 | 2 | 24+1 | 2 | 0 | 0 |
| 11 | MF | (Spain) ESP | Álex Collado | 34 | 4 | 31+2 | 4 | 1 | 0 |
| 12 | MF | (Saudi Arabia) KSA | Abdulaziz Al Hatila | 15 | 1 | 2+12 | 1 | 1 | 0 |
| 13 | MF | (Saudi Arabia) KSA | Musleh Al-Shaikh | 12 | 1 | 5+7 | 1 | 0 | 0 |
| 14 | MF | (Egypt) EGY | Ahmed Mostafa | 8 | 0 | 3+5 | 0 | 0 | 0 |
| 17 | MF | (Saudi Arabia) KSA | Sharafi Al Saleem | 7 | 0 | 2+4 | 0 | 1 | 0 |
| 18 | MF | (Colombia) COL | Sebastián Pedroza | 26 | 1 | 26 | 1 | 0 | 0 |
| 19 | MF | (Saudi Arabia) KSA | Saud Salem | 1 | 0 | 0+1 | 0 | 0 | 0 |
| 29 | MF | (Saudi Arabia) KSA | Yaseen Al-Zubaidi | 12 | 2 | 5+7 | 2 | 0 | 0 |
| 49 | MF | (Saudi Arabia) KSA | Rayan Hattan | 1 | 0 | 0+1 | 0 | 0 | 0 |
| 77 | MF | (Saudi Arabia) KSA | Hassan Al-Habib | 15 | 1 | 7+7 | 1 | 0+1 | 0 |
Forwards
| 9 | FW | (Cameroon) CMR | Léandre Tawamba | 30 | 5 | 27+2 | 5 | 1 | 0 |
| 21 | FW | (Saudi Arabia) KSA | Mohammed Al Jahif | 16 | 0 | 3+12 | 0 | 1 | 0 |
| 24 | FW | (Saudi Arabia) KSA | Mourad Khodari | 7 | 1 | 0+6 | 0 | 0+1 | 1 |
| 99 | FW | (Nigeria) NGR | Saviour Godwin | 28 | 6 | 26+1 | 6 | 1 | 0 |

=== Goalscorers ===
| Rank | No. | Pos | Nat | Name | Pro League | King Cup | Total |
|---|---|---|---|---|---|---|---|
| 1 | 3 | DF | (Romania) | Andrei Burcă | 6 | 0 | 6 |
| 1 | 99 | FW | (Nigeria) | Saviour Godwin | 6 | 0 | 6 |
| 3 | 9 | FW | (Cameroon) | Léandre Tawamba | 5 | 0 | 5 |
| 4 | 11 | MF | (Spain) | Álex Collado | 4 | 0 | 4 |
| 5 | 4 | DF | (Saudi Arabia) | Saeed Al-Rubaie | 2 | 0 | 2 |
| 5 | 10 | MF | (Romania) | Florin Tănase | 2 | 0 | 2 |
| 5 | 29 | MF | (Saudi Arabia) | Yaseen Al-Zubaidi | 2 | 0 | 2 |
| 8 | 5 | DF | (Georgia (country)) | Solomon Kvirkvelia | 1 | 0 | 1 |
| 8 | 12 | MF | (Saudi Arabia) | Abdulaziz Al Hatila | 1 | 0 | 1 |
| 8 | 13 | MF | (Saudi Arabia) | Musleh Al-Shaikh | 1 | 0 | 1 |
| 8 | 18 | MF | (Colombia) | Sebastián Pedroza | 1 | 0 | 1 |
| 8 | 20 | DF | (Saudi Arabia) | Hamad Al Mansour | 1 | 0 | 1 |
| 8 | 24 | FW | (Saudi Arabia) | Mourad Khodari | 0 | 1 | 1 |
| 8 | 77 | MF | (Saudi Arabia) | Hassan Al-Habib | 1 | 0 | 1 |
| Own goal | | | | | 0 | 0 | 0 |
| Total | | | | | 33 | 1 | 34 |

Last Updated: 27 May 2024

=== Assists ===
| Rank | No. | Pos | Nat | Name | Pro League | King Cup | Total |
|---|---|---|---|---|---|---|---|
| 1 | 9 | FW | (Cameroon) | Léandre Tawamba | 3 | 0 | 3 |
| 1 | 10 | MF | (Romania) | Florin Tănase | 3 | 0 | 3 |
| 1 | 11 | MF | (Spain) | Álex Collado | 3 | 0 | 3 |
| 4 | 3 | DF | (Romania) | Andrei Burcă | 1 | 1 | 2 |
| 4 | 8 | DF | (Saudi Arabia) | Hussain Al-Zabdani | 2 | 0 | 2 |
| 4 | 18 | MF | (Colombia) | Sebastián Pedroza | 2 | 0 | 2 |
| 4 | 20 | DF | (Saudi Arabia) | Hamad Al Mansour | 2 | 0 | 2 |
| 8 | 1 | GK | (Brazil) | Paulo Vítor | 1 | 0 | 1 |
| 8 | 5 | DF | (Georgia (country)) | Solomon Kvirkvelia | 1 | 0 | 1 |
| 8 | 6 | MF | (Saudi Arabia) | Eid Al-Muwallad | 1 | 0 | 1 |
| 8 | 15 | DF | (Saudi Arabia) | Naif Asiri | 1 | 0 | 1 |
| 8 | 99 | FW | (Nigeria) | Saviour Godwin | 1 | 0 | 1 |
| Total | | | | | 21 | 1 | 22 |

Last Updated: 27 May 2024

=== Clean sheets ===
| Rank | No. | Pos | Nat | Name | Pro League | King Cup | Total |
|---|---|---|---|---|---|---|---|
| 1 | 1 | GK | (Brazil) | Paulo Vítor | 7 | 0 | 7 |
| 2 | 25 | GK | (Saudi Arabia) | Abdulaziz Al-Awairdhi | 1 | 0 | 1 |
| Total | | | | | 8 | 0 | 8 |

Last Updated: 27 May 2024
