= 2025–26 Al-Okhdood Club season =

Al-Okhdood
2025–26 season
- President: Sami Al Fadhel
- Manager: Paulo Sérgio
- Stadium: Prince Hathloul bin Abdulaziz Sports City
- Pro League: Pre-season
- King Cup: Round of 32
- All statistics correct as of 1 July 2025.

The 2025–26 season is Al-Okhdood's third consecutive season in the Pro League and 49th year in existence. The club will participate in the Pro League and the King Cup.

The season covers the period from 1 July 2025 to 30 June 2026.

== Players ==
=== Squad information ===
As of 1 February 2025

Note: Flags indicate national team as defined under FIFA eligibility rules; some limited exceptions apply. Players may hold more than one non-FIFA nationality.

No.	Pos.	Nation	Player
1	GK	KSA	Rakan Al-Najjar
2	DF	KSA	Mohammed Al-Saeed
4	DF	KSA	Saeed Al-Rubaie
7	FW	GUI	Ousmane Barry
8	DF	KSA	Hussain Al-Zabdani
12	MF	KSA	Abdulaziz Al Hotailah
13	FW	CMR	Christian Bassogog
14	FW	KSA	Saleh Al Abbas
15	DF	KSA	Naif Asiri
17	DF	JAM	Damion Lowe
18	MF	COL	Sebastián Pedroza
19	MF	KSA	Saud Salem

No.	Pos.	Nation	Player
20	MF	KSA	Saleh Al-Harthi
21	FW	KSA	Mohammed Naif
22	GK	KSA	Mohammed Al-Qareh
27	DF	KSA	Awadh Khamis
29	MF	KSA	Ahmed Al Daghrir
64	FW	EGY	Karim Ashraf
66	MF	BRA	Petros
77	MF	KSA	Saif Balhareth
87	MF	KSA	Ghassan Hawsawi
92	GK	KSA	Saad Al-Qarni
98	DF	KSA	Muhannad Al-Qaydhi
—	MF	KSA	Mesleh Al-Shaikh

== Transfers and loans ==
=== Transfers in ===
Entry date	Position	No.	Player	From club	Fee	Ref.
30 June 2025	MF	–	(Saudi Arabia) Mesleh Al-Shaikh	(Saudi Arabia) Al-Arabi	End of loan	
17 July 2025	MF	17	(Germany) Gökhan Gül	(Turkey) Kasımpaşa	Free	
22 July 2025	DF	22	(Germany) Koray Günter	(Italy) Hellas Verona	Free	
23 August 2025	GK	26	(Saudi Arabia) Hatem Al-Johani	(Saudi Arabia) Al-Adalah	Free	
25 August 2025	DF	21	(Saudi Arabia) Mohammed Abu Abd	(Saudi Arabia) Al-Adalah	$215,000	
7 September 2025	MF	7	(Togo) Khaled Narey	(Saudi Arabia) Al-Ula	Free	
23 September 2025	MF	11	(Turkey) Burak İnce	(Poland) Śląsk Wrocław	Free	
18 January 2026	FW	93	(Norway) Tokmac Nguen	(Sweden) Djurgårdens	Free	

=== Loans in ===
Start date	End date	Position	No.	Player	From club	Fee	Ref.
18 July 2025	End of season	GK	94	(Brazil) Samuel Portugal	(Portugal) Porto	$250,000	
20 August 2025	23 January 2026	FW	9	(Slovenia) Blaž Kramer	(Turkey) Konyaspor	$750,000	
25 August 2025	End of season	DF	3	(Saudi Arabia) Ali Al-Salem	(Saudi Arabia) Al-Wehda	None	
4 September 2025	End of season	MF	55	(Argentina) Mateo Borrell	(Saudi Arabia) Al-Ittihad	None	

=== Transfers out ===
Exit date	Position	No.	Player	To club	Fee	Ref.
30 June 2025	MF	26	(Saudi Arabia) Yaseen Al-Zubaidi	(Saudi Arabia) Al-Ahli	End of loan	
30 June 2025	FW	9	(Mali) Ibrahima Koné	(Spain) Almería	End of loan	
1 July 2025	GK	28	(Brazil) Paulo Vítor	(Brazil) Atlético Goianiense	Free	
6 July 2025	FW	10	(Nigeria) Saviour Godwin	(United Arab Emirates) Baniyas	Free	
15 July 2025	DF	16	(Brazil) Diego Ferreira	(United Arab Emirates) Dibba	Free	
28 July 2025	MF	11	(Zimbabwe) Knowledge Musona	(Zimbabwe) Scottland	Free	
5 August 2025	FW	7	(Guinea) Ousmane Barry	(Saudi Arabia) Al-Bukiryah	Free	
20 August 2025	DF	17	(Jamaica) Damion Lowe	(Iraq) Erbil	Free	
27 August 2025	DF	2	(Saudi Arabia) Mohammed Al-Saeed	(Saudi Arabia) Al-Riyadh	Free	
5 September 2025	MF	–	(Saudi Arabia) Mesleh Al-Shaikh	(Saudi Arabia) Al-Raed	Free	
12 January 2026	FW	–	(Saudi Arabia) Abdullah Al Ajyan	(Saudi Arabia) Al-Kholood	Free	

== Pre-season ==
2 August 2025 Friendly	Al-Okhdood (Saudi Arabia)	0–0	(Qatar) Al-Bidda	İzmit, Turkey
18:00 TRT

6 August 2025 Friendly	Al-Okhdood (Saudi Arabia)	1–1	(Saudi Arabia) Al-Najma	Sapanca, Turkey
18:00 TRT	Petros 36'	Report	Sow 53'	Stadium: Sapanca Ataturk Stadyumu

9 August 2025 Friendly	Al-Okhdood (Saudi Arabia)	1–0	(Kuwait) Al-Qadsia	Gölcük, Turkey
18:00 TRT	Asiri	Report		Stadium: Gölcük Şehir Stadyumu

22 August 2025 Friendly	Al-Okhdood (Saudi Arabia)	0–2	(Saudi Arabia) Damac	Abha, Saudi Arabia
17:00 AST				Stadium: Prince Sultan bin Abdulaziz Sports City

== Competitions ==
=== Overview ===
Competition	Record							
Competition	Pld	W	D	L	GF	GA	GD	Win %
Pro League	18	2	3	13	14	34	−20	11.11
King's Cup	2	1	0	1	1	1	+0	50.00
Total	20	3	3	14	15	35	−20	15.00

Updated to match played 30 January 2026
Source: Competitions

=== Pro League ===
==== League table ====
Pos	Team	Pld	W	D	L	GF	GA	GD	Pts	Qualification or relegation
14	Al-Kholood	34	9	6	19	39	61	−22	33	
15	Al-Riyadh	34	7	9	18	35	63	−28	30	
16	Damac (R)	34	6	11	17	32	55	−23	29	Relegation to FD League
17	Al-Okhdood (R)	34	5	5	24	27	70	−43	20	Relegation to FD League
18	Al-Najma (R)	34	3	7	24	32	76	−44	16	Relegation to FD League

Source: SPL
Rules for classification: 1) Points; 2) Head-to-head points; 3) Head-to-head goal difference; 4) Total goal difference; 5) Total goals scored; 6) Fair-play points
(Note: Head-to-head record is used only after all the matches between the teams in question have been played).
(R) Relegated

==== Results summary ====
Overall								Home						Away					
Pld	W	D	L	GF	GA	GD	Pts	W	D	L	GF	GA	GD	W	D	L	GF	GA	GD
18	2	3	13	14	34	−20	9	2	2	5	11	16	−5	0	1	8	3	18	−15

Last updated: 30 January 2026.
Source: Saudi Pro League

==== Results by round ====
Round	1	2	3	4	5	6	7	8	9	11	12	13	14	15	16	17	18	19	20	21	22	23	10	24	25	26	27	28	29	30	31	32	33	34
Ground	H	H	A	A	H	A	H	A	H	A	H	A	H	H	A	H	A	A	H	H	A	H	A	A	H	A	H	H	A	H	A	A	H	A
Result	L	L	L	L	L	D	W	L	D	L	L	L	L	W	L	D	L	L																
Position	16	18	18	18	17	17	16	16	15	17	17	17	17	17	17	17	17	17																

Updated to match(es) played on 30 January 2026. Source: Saudi Pro League
A = Away; H = Home; W = Win; D = Draw; L = Loss

==== Matches ====
All times are local, AST (UTC+3).

Win Draw Loss Postponed

30 August 2025 1	Al-Okhdood	2–5	Al-Ittihad	Najran
21:00	Pedroza 27', 57'; Al-Rubaie (yellow card) 36'; Asiri (yellow card) 49' (yellow-red card) 83'; Al-Jahif (yellow card) 70'	Report	Benzema 4', 51', 60'; Steven Bergwijn 7'; Al-Rubaie 29' (o.g.); Diaby (yellow card) 78'	Stadium: Prince Hathloul bin Abdulaziz Sports City; Attendance: 3,911; Referee: Mohammed Al-Hoaish

13 September 2025 2	Al-Okhdood	2–3	Al-Taawoun	Najran
18:45	Kramer 31', (yellow card) 60'; Günter 56', (yellow card) 59'	Report	Flávio (yellow card) 12'; Barrow 15', 65'; Girotto (yellow card) 23'; Martínez 28'	Stadium: Prince Hathloul bin Abdulaziz Sports City; Attendance: 1,623; Referee: Khaled Al-Turais

18 September 2025 3	Neom	1–0	Al-Okhdood	Tabuk
21:00	Al-Oyayari 28', (yellow card) 88'; Doucouré (yellow card) 51'	Report	Kramer (yellow card) 20'; Al-Salem (yellow card) 26'; Pedroza (yellow card) 82' (yellow-red card) 90+3'	Stadium: King Khalid Sport City Stadium; Attendance: 2,497; Referee: Shukri Al-Hanfoush

25 September 2025 4	Al-Hilal	3–1	Al-Okhdood	Riyadh
21:00	Koulibaly (yellow card) 25'; Leonardo 45', 79'; Hernández 45+4'	Report	Narey 14'; Kramer (yellow card) 45+6'; Gül (yellow card) 72'; Asiri (yellow card) 83'; Hawsawi (yellow card) 90+3'	Stadium: Kingdom Arena; Attendance: 16,540; Referee: Erik Lambrechts (Belgium)

18 October 2025 5	Al-Okhdood	1–2	Al-Hazem	Najran
18:15	Hawsawi 33'; Narey (yellow card) 46'; Pedroza (yellow card) 69'	Report	Al-Habshi 20'; Al-Nakhli 40'; Mokwana (yellow card) 57'; Varela (yellow card) 83'	Stadium: Prince Hathloul bin Abdulaziz Sports City; Attendance: 1,788; Referee: Mohammed Al-Ismail

25 October 2025 6	Al-Qadsiah	0–0	Al-Okhdood	Dammam
17:40	Weigl (yellow card) 30'; Nández (yellow card) 69'	Report	Abu Abd (yellow card) 62' (yellow-red card) 70'; Petros (yellow card) 71'	Stadium: Prince Mohamed bin Fahd Stadium; Attendance: 6,482; Referee: Anastasios Sidiropoulos (Greece)

31 October 2025 7	Al-Okhdood	2–1	Al-Najma	Najran
16:40	Al-Rubaie 19', 80', (yellow card) 90+3'; Kramer (yellow card) 67'	Report	Petros 53' (o.g.); Lázaro (yellow card) 54'	Stadium: Prince Hathloul bin Abdulaziz Sports City; Attendance: 1,242; Referee: Ahmed Al-Rumaikhani

7 November 2025 8	Al-Fayha	2–0	Al-Okhdood	Al Majma'ah
16:20	Ganvoula 61'; Sakala 70'	Report	Al-Rubaie (yellow card) 90+1'	Stadium: Al-Majma'ah Sports City Stadium; Attendance: 852; Referee: Shukri Al-Hanfoush

23 November 2025 9	Al-Okhdood	1–1	Al-Shabab	Najran
18:05	Narey 45+2'; Ashi (yellow card) 88'; Petros (yellow card) 90+10'	Report	Al-Sibyani (yellow card) 21'; Hamdallah 33', (yellow card) 80'	Stadium: Prince Hathloul bin Abdulaziz Sports City; Attendance: 2,851; Referee: Abdullah Al-Owaidan

27 December 2025 11	Al-Nassr	3–0	Al-Okhdood	Riyadh
17:50	Ronaldo 31', 45+3'; Félix 90+4'	Report	Al-Rubaie (yellow card) 61'; Al-Harthi (yellow card) 90+2'	Stadium: Al-Awwal Park; Attendance: 19,472; Referee: Faisal Al-Blwi

30 December 2025 12	Al-Okhdood	0–1	Damac	Najran
20:30	Borrell (yellow card) 20'; Al-Harthi (yellow card) 82'; Al Abbas (red card) 90+4'	Report	Vada 5'; Bedrane (yellow card) 19'	Stadium: Prince Hathloul bin Abdulaziz Sports City; Attendance: 1,214; Referee: Majed Al-Shamrani

2 January 2026 13	Al-Ettifaq	2–0	Al-Okhdood	Dammam
17:35	Wijnaldum 54', 76' (pen.); Al-Khateeb (yellow card) 57'; Al-Ghamdi (yellow card) 90+8'	Report		Stadium: EGO Stadium; Attendance: 1,696; Referee: Mohammed Al-Hanfosh

10 January 2026 14	Al-Okhdood	0–1	Al-Ahli	Najran
20:30	Pedroza (yellow card) 6'; Petros (yellow card) 55'; Al-Salem (yellow card) 89'; Asiri (yellow card) 90+2'	Report	Gonçalves (yellow card) 45+4'; Millot (yellow card) 48'; Toney 58', (yellow card) 90+2'	Stadium: Prince Hathloul bin Abdulaziz Sports City; Attendance: 4,361; Referee: Khaled Al-Turais

13 January 2026 15	Al-Okhdood	1–0	Al-Kholood	Najran
18:25	Gül (yellow card) 20'; Bassogog 54'; Asiri (yellow card) 77'; Al-Rubaie (yellow card) 85'	Report	Buckley (yellow card) 78'	Stadium: Prince Hathloul bin Abdulaziz Sports City; Attendance: 1,402; Referee: Sami Al-Jurays

16 January 2026 16	Al-Khaleej	4–1	Al-Okhdood	Dammam
17:45	Rebocho (yellow card) 7'; King 37'; Masouras 50', 80'; Fortounis 77'	Report	Al-Salem (yellow card) 74'; Asiri (yellow card) 88'; Al Hatila 90+2'	Stadium: Prince Mohamed bin Fahd Stadium; Attendance: 2,178; Referee: Shukri Al-Hanfosh

21 January 2026 17	Al-Okhdood	2–2	Al-Riyadh	Najran
18:30	Al-Rubaie (yellow card) 25', (goal) 62', 86'; Petros (yellow card) 28'; Nguen (yellow card) 45+2' (yellow-red card) 47'; Pedroza (yellow card) 71'	Report	Al-Khaibari (yellow card) 8'; Al-Bawardi (yellow card) 19'; Tozé 26'; Al-Siyahi (yellow card) 56'; Haroun 90+5'	Stadium: Prince Hathloul bin Abdulaziz Sports City; Attendance: 2,284; Referee: Abdulsamad Bakri

26 January 2026 18	Al-Ittihad	2–1	Al-Okhdood	Jeddah
20:30	Aouar 12'; Kanté 43'	Report	Asiri (yellow card) 14'; İnce 59'; Hawsawi (yellow card) 64'	Stadium: Alinma Stadium; Attendance: 8,102; Referee: Shukri Al-Hanfoush

30 January 2026 19	Al-Taawoun	1–0	Al-Okhdood	Buraidah
16:50	Sémbène (yellow card) 35'; Al-Qahtani 58'; Martínez (yellow card) 83'	Report	Al-Rubaie (yellow card) 6'; Asiri (yellow card) 31'; Ashi (yellow card) 86'	Stadium: Al-Taawoun Club Stadium; Attendance: 4,069; Referee: Sami Al-Jurays

20 December 2025 10	Al-Fateh	v	Al-Okhdood	Al-Hasa
17:30				Stadium: Maydan Tamweel Aloula

=== King's Cup ===
All times are local, AST (UTC+3).

21 September 2025 Round of 32	Al-Raed	0–1	Al-Okhdood	Buraidah
18:35	Al-Shaikh (yellow card) 45+3'; Shami (yellow card) 76'	Report	Narey 5'; Al-Qaydhi (yellow card) 41'; Hawsawi (yellow card) 43'; Bassogog (yellow card) 61'; Al-Qaydhi (yellow card) 90+4'	Stadium: Al-Raed Club Stadium; Referee: Mohammed Al-Ghamdi

28 October 2025 Round of 16	Al-Okhdood	0–1	Al-Hilal	Najran
18:10	Borrell (yellow card) 24'; Al-Qaydhi (yellow card) 45'	Report	Al-Hamdan (yellow card) 36'; Leonardo 45+3' (pen.)	Stadium: Prince Hathloul bin Abdulaziz Sports City Stadium; Attendance: 5,740; Referee: Slavko Vinčić (Slovenia)

== Statistics ==
=== Appearances ===
Last updated on 30 January 2026.

No.	Pos	Nat	Player	Total		Pro League		King Cup	
No.	Pos	Nat	Player	Apps	Goals	Apps	Goals	Apps	Goals
Goalkeepers
1	GK	(Saudi Arabia) KSA	Rakan Al-Najjar	6	0	4	0	2	0
26	GK	(Saudi Arabia) KSA	Hatem Al-Juhani	0	0	0	0	0	0
92	GK	(Saudi Arabia) KSA	Saad Al-Qarni	0	0	0	0	0	0
94	GK	(Brazil) BRA	Samuel Portugal	14	0	14	0	0	0
Defenders
3	DF	(Saudi Arabia) KSA	Ali Al-Salem	20	0	16+2	0	1+1	0
4	DF	(Saudi Arabia) KSA	Saeed Al-Rubaie	16	4	15	4	1	0
8	DF	(Saudi Arabia) KSA	Hussain Al-Zabdani	3	0	0+3	0	0	0
15	DF	(Saudi Arabia) KSA	Naif Asiri	13	0	9+2	0	2	0
21	DF	(Saudi Arabia) KSA	Mohammed Abu Abd	15	0	12+1	0	1+1	0
22	DF	(Germany) GER	Koray Günter	16	1	13+1	1	1+1	0
88	DF	(Saudi Arabia) KSA	Ibrahim Ashi	6	0	4+2	0	0	0
98	DF	(Saudi Arabia) KSA	Muhannad Al-Qaydhi	10	0	3+5	0	2	0
Midfielders
6	MF	(Brazil) BRA	Petros	18	0	16	0	2	0
7	MF	(Togo) TOG	Khaled Narey	12	3	10	2	1+1	1
11	MF	(Turkey) TUR	Burak İnce	14	1	7+6	1	1	0
12	MF	(Saudi Arabia) KSA	Abdulaziz Al Hatila	17	1	2+13	1	2	0
17	MF	(Germany) GER	Gökhan Gül	20	0	18	0	0+2	0
18	MF	(Colombia) COL	Sebastián Pedroza	19	2	16+1	2	1+1	0
19	MF	(Saudi Arabia) KSA	Saud Salem	3	0	0+3	0	0	0
20	MF	(Saudi Arabia) KSA	Saleh Al-Harthi	13	0	1+11	0	0+1	0
55	MF	(Argentina) ARG	Mateo Borrell	6	0	4+1	0	1	0
77	MF	(Saudi Arabia) KSA	Saif Balhareth	0	0	0	0	0	0
87	MF	(Saudi Arabia) KSA	Ghassan Hawsawi	10	1	5+4	1	1	0
Forwards
10	FW	(Saudi Arabia) KSA	Mohammed Al Jahif	7	0	1+5	0	0+1	0
13	FW	(Cameroon) CMR	Christian Bassogog	15	1	13+1	1	1	0
14	FW	(Saudi Arabia) KSA	Saleh Al Abbas	11	0	2+7	0	1+1	0
93	FW	(Norway) NOR	Tokmac Nguen	2	0	2	0	0	0
96	FW	(Saudi Arabia) KSA	Ahmed Majrashi	1	0	0+1	0	0	0
Player who made an appearance this season but have left the club
9	FW	(Slovenia) SLO	Blaž Kramer	14	1	11+2	1	1	0

=== Goalscorers ===
Rank	No.	Pos	Nat	Name	Pro League	King Cup	Total
1	4	DF	(Saudi Arabia)	Saeed Al-Rubaie	4	0	4
2	7	MF	(Togo)	Khaled Narey	2	1	3
3	18	MF	(Colombia)	Sebastián Pedroza	2	0	2
4	9	FW	(Slovenia)	Blaž Kramer	1	0	1
4	11	MF	(Turkey)	Burak İnce	1	0	1
4	12	MF	(Saudi Arabia)	Abdulaziz Al Hatila	1	0	1
4	13	FW	(Cameroon)	Christian Bassogog	1	0	1
4	22	DF	(Germany)	Koray Günter	1	0	1
4	87	MF	(Saudi Arabia)	Ghassan Hawsawi	1	0	1
Own goal					0	0	0
Total					14	1	15

Last Updated: 26 January 2026

=== Assists ===
Rank	No.	Pos	Nat	Name	Pro League	King Cup	Total
1	13	FW	(Cameroon)	Christian Bassogog	3	0	3
1	17	MF	(Germany)	Gökhan Gül	3	0	3
3	3	DF	(Saudi Arabia)	Ali Al-Salem	1	0	1
3	4	DF	(Saudi Arabia)	Saeed Al-Rubaie	1	0	1
3	7	MF	(Togo)	Khaled Narey	1	0	1
3	14	FW	(Saudi Arabia)	Saleh Al Abbas	1	0	1
3	18	MF	(Colombia)	Sebastián Pedroza	1	0	1
3	22	DF	(Germany)	Koray Günter	1	0	1
3	55	MF	(Argentina)	Mateo Borrell	1	0	1
Total					13	0	13

Last Updated: 26 January 2026

=== Clean sheets ===
Rank	No.	Pos	Nat	Name	Pro League	King Cup	Total
1	1	GK	(Saudi Arabia)	Rakan Al-Najjar	1	1	2
2	94	GK	(Brazil)	Samuel Portugal	1	0	1
Total					2	1	3

Last Updated: 13 January 2026
