= Ahmed Mostafa =

Ahmed Mostafa may refer to:

- Ahmed Mostafa (footballer, born 1940) (1940–2022), Egyptian defender and midfielder
- Ahmed Mostafa (footballer, born 1987), Egyptian attacking midfielder
- Ahmed Mostafa (footballer, born 1997), Egyptian winger
- Ahmed Sayed (born 1996), Ahmed Mostafa Mohamed Sayed, Egyptian football winger
- Ahmed Rady Mostafa (born 1993), Egyptian trampolinist at the 2015 Trampoline World Championships
