= Burak İnce =

Turkish professional footballer

Personal information
- Date of birth: 20 January 2004 (age 22)
- Place of birth: Manisa, Turkey
- Height: 1.78 m (5 ft 10 in)
- Position: Midfielder

Team information
- Current team: Al-Okhdood
- Number: 11

Youth career
- 2014–2015: Manisaspor
- 2015–2019: Altınordu

Senior career*
Years	Team	Apps	(Gls)
2019–2022	Altınordu	64	(8)
2022–2023	Arminia Bielefeld	7	(0)
2023–2025	Śląsk Wrocław	36	(4)
2023–2024	Śląsk Wrocław II	4	(1)
2025-	Al-Okhdood	12	(1)

International career^{‡}
2018	Turkey U14	4	(1)
2018	Turkey U15	13	(5)
2019	Turkey U16	8	(4)
2020–2023	Turkey U19	9	(3)
2025–	Turkey U20	1	(0)
2021–	Turkey U21	9	(2)
- * Club domestic league appearances and goals as of 20:29, 26 January 2026 (UTC) ‡ National team caps and goals as of 21:30, 8 June 2025 (UTC)

Burak İnce (born 20 January 2004) is a Turkish professional footballer who plays as a midfielder for Saudi Pro League club Al-Okhdood.

== Club career ==
=== Altınordu (2019–2022) ===
Burak İnce came through the academy of Altınordu, which produced several Turkish talents, such as Cengiz Ünder, Çağlar Söyüncü, Barış Alıcı, Berke Özer and Ravil Tagir.

İnce made his professional debuts with Altınordu on 8 August 2020 against Hatayspor, becoming the youngest ever footballer to play in the TFF First League. Nearly a month after, he also became the youngest goalscorer in a 4–1 victory against Eskişehirspor, where he also delivered an assist for Anıl Koç.

=== Arminia Bielefeld (2022–2023) ===
İnce was reportedly monitored by notable European clubs such as Bayern Munich, Manchester City or Leicester, and he stated he dreamed of playing for FC Barcelona. In November 2021, it was announced İnce would join Bundesliga club Arminia Bielefeld in late January 2022, after his 18th birthday. He agreed on a contract until 2025.

On 13 March 2022, he made his Bundesliga debut in a 1-0 away lost against Borussia Dortmund as a late substitute.

On 16 July 2022, he made his 2. Bundesliga debut against SV Sandhausen. On 31 July 2022, he made his DFB Pokal debut against Oberliga Rheinland-Pfalz/Saar club FV Engers 07 in a 1-7 away victory.

=== Śląsk Wrocław (2023–2025) ===
On 13 July 2023, following Arminia's relegation to 3. Liga, İnce signed a two-year deal with Ekstraklasa club Śląsk Wrocław on a free transfer.

On 29 July 2023, he made his Ekstraklasa debut against Zagłębie Lubin in a 1-2 home lost as a substitute. On 15 September 2023, he scored his first goal with the team against Puszcza Niepołomice, he also made an assist in a 3-1 away win.

On 29 September 2023, he made his Polish Cup debut against Jagiellonia Bialystok.

=== Al-Okhdood (2025–present) ===
On 23 September 2025, he signed with Saudi Pro League club Al-Okhdood.

On 18 October 2025, he made his Saudi Pro League debut against Al-Hazem. On 28 October 2025, he made King's Cup debut against Al-Hilal.

== Career statistics ==
As of matches played 7 November 2025

Appearances and goals by club, season and competition
Club	Season	League			National cup (Note: Includes Turkish Cup, DFB-Pokal, Polish Cup, King's Cup)		Continental		Other		Total	
Club	Season	Division	Apps	Goals	Apps	Goals	Apps	Goals	Apps	Goals	Apps	Goals
Altınordu	2019–20	TFF 1. Lig	21	2	3	0	—		—		24	2
Altınordu	2020–21	TFF 1. Lig	28	5	2	1	—		—		30	6
Altınordu	2021–22	TFF 1. Lig	15	1	2	1	—		—		17	2
Altınordu	Total		64	8	7	2	—		—		71	10
Arminia Bielefeld	2021–22	Bundesliga	5	0	0	0	—		—		5	0
Arminia Bielefeld	2022–23	2. Bundesliga	2	0	1	0	—		—		3	0
Arminia Bielefeld	Total		7	0	1	0	0	0	0	0	8	0
Śląsk Wrocław	2023–24	Ekstraklasa	16	2	1	0	—		—		17	2
Śląsk Wrocław	2024–25	Ekstraklasa	20	2	1	0	3 (Note: Appearances in UEFA Conference League)	0	—		24	2
Śląsk Wrocław	Total		36	4	2	0	3	0	—		41	4
Śląsk Wrocław II	2023–24	III liga, group III	3	0	0	0	—		—		3	0
Śląsk Wrocław II	2024–25	III liga, group III	1	1	—		—		—		1	1
Śląsk Wrocław II	Total		4	1	0	0	—		—		4	1
Al-Okhdood	2025–26	Saudi Pro League	3	0	1	0	—		—		4	0
Career total			114	13	11	2	3	0	0	0	128	15

== Honours ==
Śląsk Wrocław II

- III liga, group III: 2024–25
