= Koray Günter =

German footballer (born 1994)

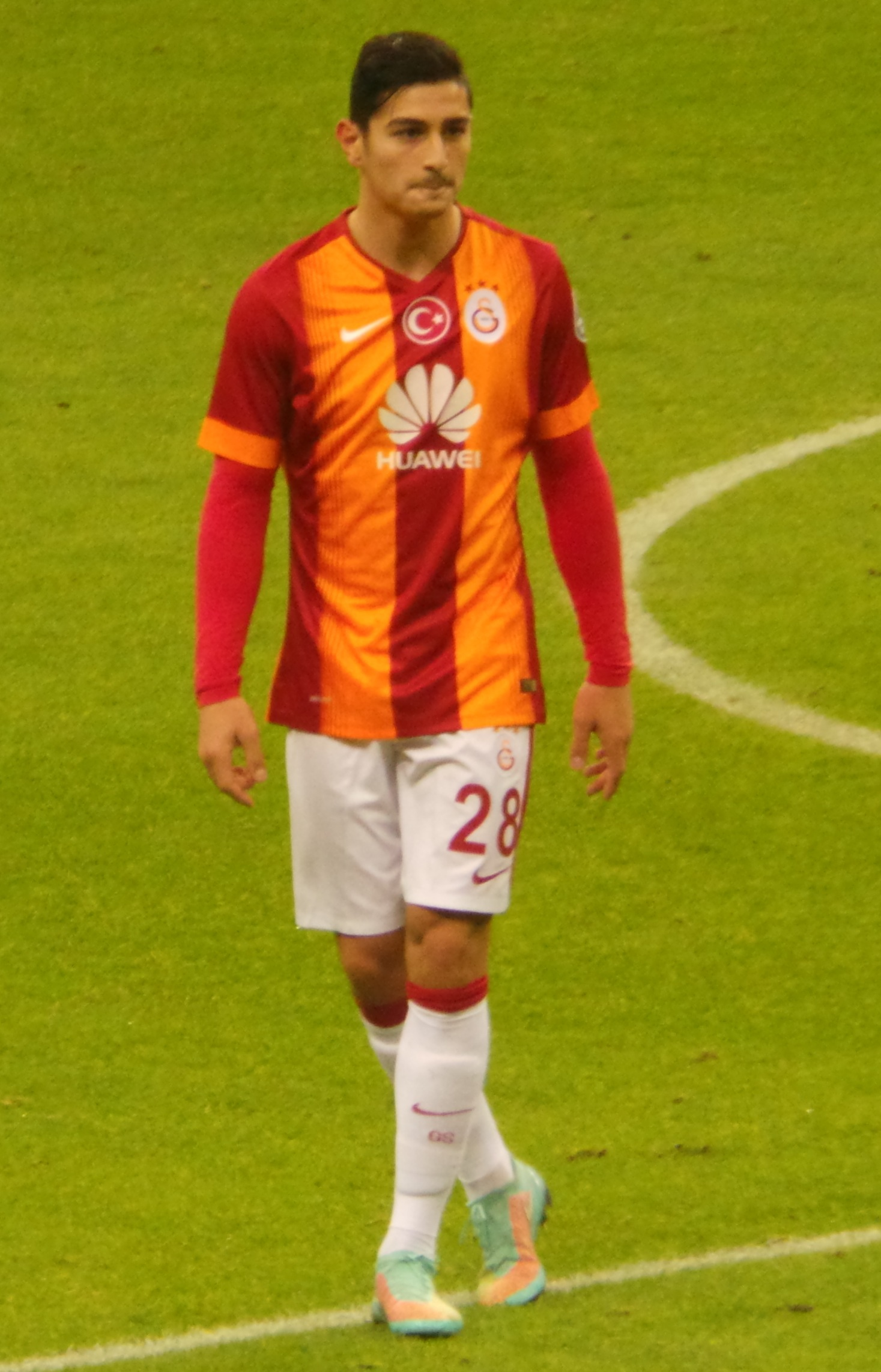
- Günter playing for Galatasaray in 2014

Personal information
- Date of birth: 16 August 1994 (age 32)
- Place of birth: Höxter, Germany
- Height: 1.84 m (6 ft 0 in)
- Position: Centre-back

Team information
- Current team: Kalba
- Number: 22

Youth career
- 2001–2006: SV Höxter
- 2006–2008: SpVgg Brakel
- 2008–2013: Borussia Dortmund

Senior career*
Years	Team	Apps	(Gls)
2012–2013	Borussia Dortmund II	25	(0)
2013–2014	Borussia Dortmund	0	(0)
2014–2018	Galatasaray	28	(0)
2018–2020	Genoa	14	(0)
2019–2020	→ Hellas Verona (loan)	32	(0)
2020–2025	Hellas Verona	70	(1)
2023	→ Sampdoria (loan)	10	(0)
2024	→ Fatih Karagümrük (loan)	10	(0)
2024–2025	→ Göztepe (loan)	25	(2)
2025–2026	Al-Okhdood	25	(1)
2026–	Kalba	0	(0)

International career
2009–2010	Turkey U16	4	(0)
2010–2011	Germany U17	19	(4)
2012–2013	Germany U19	12	(0)
2013–2014	Germany U20	4	(0)
Medal record
Men's football
Representing Germany
European Under-17 Championship
Runner-up	2011
FIFA U-17 World Cup
Bronze medal – third place	2011
- * Club domestic league appearances and goals as of 30 April 2026

Koray Günter (German pronunciation: [ˈkoːˌʁaɪ ˈɡʏntɐ], Turkish pronunciation: [koɾaj ɟyntæɾ]; born 16 August 1994) is a German professional footballer who plays as a centre-back for Kalba in the UAE Pro League.

== Personal life ==
Günter was born in Höxter in North Rhine Westfalia. He went to König-Wilhelm-Highschool in Höxter and then switched to Leibniz-Gymnasium in Dortmund. He is in a relationship with Betty Taube, who is known for her participation in the German TV Show Germany's Next Topmodel. The two are engaged since January 2016.

On 11 October 2020, he tested positive for COVID-19.

== Club career ==
=== Borussia Dortmund ===
Günter began his career in 2001 for SV Höxter, before moving to SpVg Brakel in 2006. Günter was elected sportsman of the year of Höxter in November 2011, and Günter was scouted by Borussia Dortmund at a Westfalen youth football tournament then enrolled into the Borussia Dortmund academy. Günter was previously an attacking player before being retrained as defender. He has played three seasons with the BVB academy since he joined BVB through to Borussia Dortmund II.

In the 2012–13 season, Günter succeeded to Borussia Dortmund II, playing in the German 3. Liga and on 28 August 2012, on the seventh match day of the 2012–13 3. Liga season, Günter made his debut in professional football, as he stood in the starting eleven of Borussia Dortmund II against Karlsruher SC. Günter was inducted into the Borussia Dortmund's first team in the 2012–13 Bundesliga season, where he was selected for the first time in the BVB squad as an unused substitute on 27 November 2012 in a home match against Fortuna Düsseldorf in the Bundesliga.

=== Galatasaray ===
Günter passed his medical and signed for four and half years with Galatasaray on 30 January 2014 for €2.5 million with Dortmund including a buy-back option worth €7 million.

On 12 July 2016, Günter injured while playing against Thun in a friendly match, suffered from ACL. The anticipated return to team was January–February 2017, reported by medical team.

=== Genoa ===
On 12 July 2018, Günter signed with Genoa a free transfer.

=== Hellas Verona ===
On 19 July 2019, Günter joined Hellas Verona on loan with an option to buy. The purchase option was exercised.

==== Loan to Sampdoria ====
On 31 January 2023, Günter joined Sampdoria on loan with a conditional obligation to buy.

==== Loan to Fatih Karagümrük ====
On 26 January 2024, Günter was loaned to Fatih Karagümrük.

=== Al-Okhdood ===
On 22 July 2025, Günter joined Saudi Pro League club Al-Okhdood.

== International career ==
Günter represented the Turkish U-16 national football team four times before he decided in the future to represent his country of birth Germany. Günter debuted for the German U-17 national football team on 4 September 2010, in an international friendly in Stadthagen against Azerbaijan U-17 national football team. In 2011, Günter represented the German U-17 national football team at the 2011 UEFA European Under-17 Football Championship in Serbia where the German team finished as runner-up and one month later Günter represented the German U-17 national football team at the 2011 FIFA U-17 World Cup in Mexico where the German team finished in third-place. Günter scored at the 2011 FIFA U-17 World Cup in the group game against Burkina Faso U-17 national football team, then he again scored in the second round of the 2011 FIFA U-17 World Cup in a 4–0 Germany victory against the United States U-17 national football team, before Günter again scored in the 2011 FIFA U-17 World Cup third-place match where Germany were victorious in a 4–3 victory against Brazil U-17 national football team. Günter's teammate Marvin Ducksch scored two goals at the World Cup and is also enrolled in the Borussia Dortmund II squad.

On 17 April 2012, Günter debuted made for the German U-19 national football team in a 0–0 draw against Czech Republic U-19 national football team.

== Career statistics ==
=== Club ===
As of match played 30 April 2026

Appearances and goals by club, season and competition
Club	Season	League			Cup (Note: Appearances in DFB-Pokal and Turkish Cup)		Continental (Note: Appearances in UEFA Champions League and UEFA Europa League)		Other (Note: Appearances in DFL-Supercup and Turkish Super Cup)		Total	
Club	Season	Division	Apps	Goals	Apps	Goals	Apps	Goals	Apps	Goals	Apps	Goals
Borussia Dortmund II	2012–13	3. Liga	17	0	–		–		–		17	0
Borussia Dortmund II	2013–14	3. Liga	8	0	–		–		–		8	0
Borussia Dortmund	2013–14	Bundesliga	1	0	0	0	0	0	0	0	1	0
Borussia Dortmund	Total		26	0	0	0	0	0	0	0	26	0
Galatasaray	2013–14	Süper Lig	4	0	3	0	—		—		7	0
Galatasaray	2014–15	Süper Lig	12	0	7	0	0	0	0	0	19	0
Galatasaray	2015–16	Süper Lig	9	0	6	0	1	0	0	0	16	0
Galatasaray	2016–17	Süper Lig	0	0	0	0	—		—		0	0
Galatasaray	2017–18	Süper Lig	3	0	5	0	0	0	0	0	8	0
Galatasaray	Total		28	0	21	0	1	0	0	0	50	0
Genoa	2018–19	Serie A	14	0	1	0	—		—		15	0
Genoa	Total		14	0	1	0	0	0	0	0	15	0
Hellas Verona (loan)	2019–20	Serie A	32	0	1	0	—		—		33	0
Hellas Verona	2020–21	Serie A	27	0	0	0	—		—		27	0
Hellas Verona	2021–22	Serie A	30	0	1	1	—		—		31	1
Hellas Verona	2022–23	Serie A	13	1	1	0	—		—		9	1
Hellas Verona	2023–24	Serie A	0	0	0	0	—		—		0	0
Hellas Verona	Total		102	1	3	1	0	0	0	0	105	2
Sampdoria (loan)	2022–23	Serie A	10	0	—		—		—		10	0
Fatih Karagümrük (loan)	2023–24	Süper Lig	10	0	—		—		—		10	0
Göztepe (loan)	2024–25	Süper Lig	25	2	5	0	—		—		30	2
Göztepe (loan)	Total		45	2	5	0	0	0	0	0	50	2
Al-Okhdood	2025–26	Saudi Pro League	25	1	2	0	—		—		27	1
Career total			240	4	32	1	1	0	0	0	273	5

== Honours ==
Galatasaray

- Süper Lig: 2014–15, 2017–18
- Türkiye Kupası: 2013–14, 2014–15, 2015–16
- Süper Kupa: 2015, 2016

Germany U17

- UEFA European Under-17 Football Championship runners-up: 2011
- FIFA Under-17 World Cup third place: 2011
