= Petros (footballer) =

Brazilian footballer

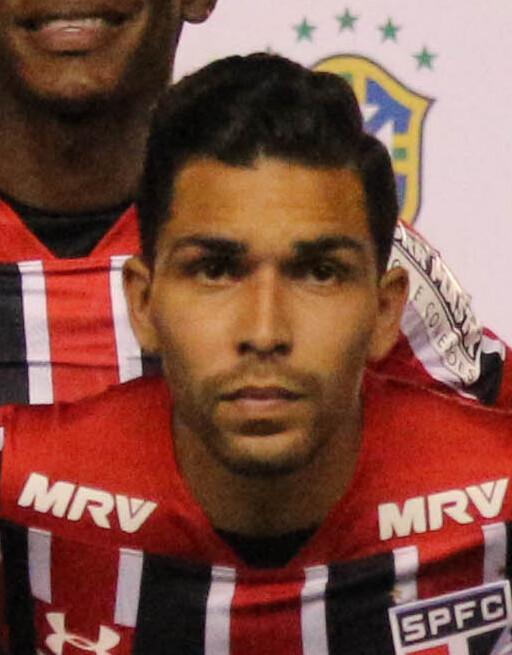
- Petros with São Paulo in 2017

Personal information
- Full name: Petros Matheus dos Santos Araújo
- Date of birth: 29 May 1989 (age 37)
- Place of birth: Juazeiro, Brazil
- Height: 1.82 m (5 ft 11 1/2 in)
- Position: Central midfielder

Youth career
- 2006–2008: Vitória

Senior career*
Years	Team	Apps	(Gls)
2008–2010	Vitória	0	(0)
2008	→ Democrata SL (loan)	?	(24)
2009	→ Rio Branco-ES (loan)	14	(4)
2010–2011	Fluminense de Feira	3	(0)
2012–2013	Boa Esporte	62	(4)
2014	Penapolense	0	(0)
2014	→ Corinthians (loan)	12	(1)
2014–2015	Corinthians	24	(1)
2015–2017	Betis	62	(2)
2017–2018	São Paulo	46	(0)
2018–2021	Al-Nassr	83	(10)
2022–2023	Al-Fateh	48	(2)
2023–2024	Neom	23	(1)
2024–2026	Al-Okhdood	41	(0)
- * Club domestic league appearances and goals as of 16 May 2023

Petros Matheus dos Santos Araújo (born 29 May 1989), simply known as Petros, is a Brazilian professional footballer who plays as a central midfielder.

== Club career ==
=== Early career ===
Born in Juazeiro, Bahia, Petros graduated with Vitória's youth setup, and made his debuts while on loan at Democrata de Sete Lagoas in 2008. After another temporary spell at Rio Branco-ES in the following year, he signed for Fluminense de Feira on 29 December 2009.

In January 2012 Petros joined Juazeirense, but only days after, signed for Boa Esporte, as a clause on his contract allowed a free transfer to a club from Série A or Série B. He made his professional debut on 29 May, coming on as a half-time substitute in a 2–1 home win against Atlético Paranaense.

Petros scored his first professional goal on 10 July 2012, netting the last in a 3–4 away loss against Criciúma. He finished the campaign with 31 appearances and four goals, as his side narrowly avoided relegation.

On 17 December 2013 Petros signed for Penapolense.

=== Corinthians ===
On 5 April 2014, after impressing with Penapolense in 2014 Campeonato Paulista, Petros signed a one-year loan deal with Corinthians, with a buyout clause.

Petros made his debut on the main category of Brazilian football on 20 April 2014, starting in a 0–0 away draw against Atlético Mineiro. On 15 July he signed a new four-year contract with Timão, who bought 50% of his federative rights, being effective on 1 August; he scored his first goal in the category late in the month, netting the last in a 2–0 home win against fierce rivals Palmeiras.

On 10 August 2014, in a 1–0 win at Santos, Petros deliberately pushed the referee Raphael Claus. Initially being punished with a six-month suspension eight days later, his charge was reduced to three matches on 11 September.

=== Betis ===
On 22 June 2015 Petros signed a four-year contract with Real Betis, newly promoted to La Liga, for a rumoured €1.5 million fee, with the transfer being officially announced three days later.

Petros made his debut for the club on 29 August, replacing Alfred N'Diaye in a 0–5 away loss against Real Madrid. He scored his first goal abroad on 24 September, but in a 1–2 home loss against Deportivo de La Coruña.

=== São Paulo ===
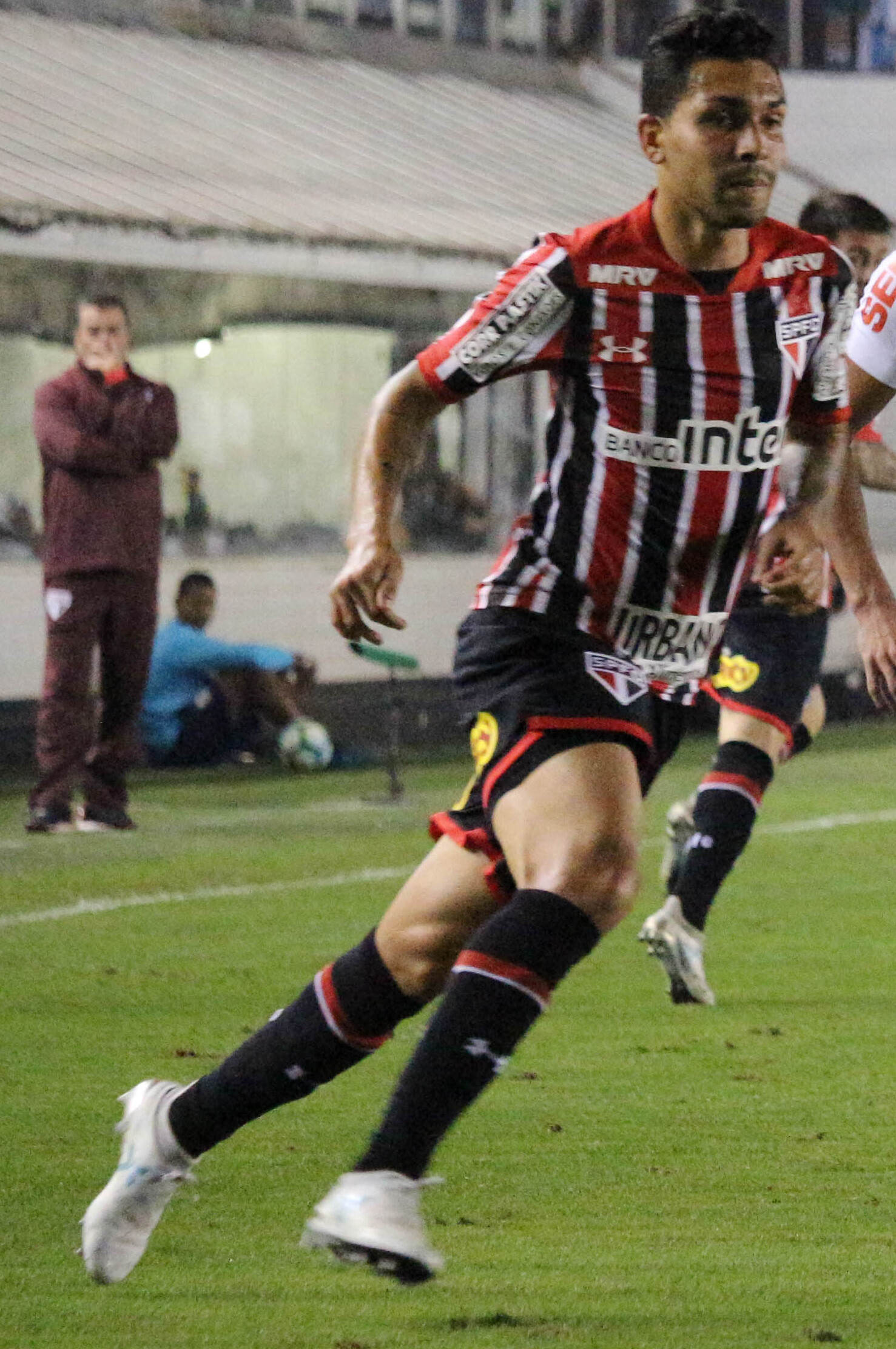
Petros in action for São Paulo in 2017

On 21 June 2017, Betis accepted the offer from São Paulo for Petros. São Paulo bought 50% of Petros' rights, and he must come to Brazil, for signing his contract, on June 26. On June 29, Petros was appointed by the club. He said he is living the best moment of his career. Petros will wear the shirt number 6

=== Saudi Arabia ===
On June 27, 2018, Al Nassr signed Brazilian midfielder Petros for two seasons by buying the player's card from Sao Paulo to represent Al Nassr from the new season to represent Al Nassr from the new season of the Saudi Professional League, Al Nassr revealed in a tweet on his official account of the social networking site Twitter that the 29-year-old player was officially signed, accompanied by a welcome statement with his age and position on the pitch.

On 18 September 2023, Petros joined Saudi Second Division club Neom on a free transfer.

On 29 August 2024, Petros joined Saudi Pro League club Al-Okhdood on a one-year deal.

== Career statistics ==
As of 5 April 2024

Club	Season	League		Cup		Continental		Other		Total	
Club	Season	Apps	Goals	Apps	Goals	Apps	Goals	Apps	Goals	Apps	Goals
Democrata SL	2008	—		—		—		?	9	?	9
Rio Branco-ES	2009	—		—		—		14	4	14	4
Fluminense de Feira	2010	3	0	—		—		15	0	18	0
Fluminense de Feira	2011	0	0	—		—		15	2	15	2
Fluminense de Feira	Total	3	0	—		—		30	2	33	2
Boa Esporte	2012	31	4	—		—		2	0	33	4
Boa Esporte	2013	31	0	2	0	—		4	0	37	0
Boa Esporte	Total	62	4	2	0	—		6	0	70	4
Penapolense	2014	—		—		—		14	1	14	1
Corinthians	2014	28	2	6	0	—		—		34	2
Corinthians	2015	8	0	0	0	3	0	13	2	24	2
Corinthians	Total	36	2	6	0	3	0	13	2	58	4
Betis	2015–16	30	1	3	0	—		—		33	1
Betis	2016–17	32	1	1	0	—		—		33	1
Betis	Total	62	2	4	0	0	0	0	0	66	2
São Paulo	2017	27	1	—		—		—		27	1
São Paulo	2018	6	0	4	0	2	0	13	0	25	0
São Paulo	Total	33	1	4	0	2	0	13	0	52	1
Al-Nassr	2018–19	27	1	5	2	0	0	2 (Note: Appearance(s) in Arab Club Champions Cup)	0	34	3
Al-Nassr	2019–20	27	3	5	2	0	0	1 (Note: Appearance(s) in Saudi Super Cup)	0	33	5
Al-Nassr	2020–21	26	6	3	0	6	1	1	1	36	8
Al-Nassr	2021–22	3	0	0	0	0	0	—		3	0
Al-Nassr	Total	83	10	13	4	6	1	4	1	106	16
Al-Fateh	2021–22	15	1	0	0	—		—		15	1
Al-Fateh	2022–23	28	1	2	0	—		—		30	1
Al-Fateh	2023–24	5	0	0	0	—		—		5	0
Al-Fateh	Total	48	2	2	0	0	0	0	0	50	2
Neom	2023–24	23	1	—		—		—		23	1
Al-Okhdood	2024–25	25	0	1	0	—		—		26	0
Al-Okhdood	2025–26	0	0	0	0	—		—		0	0
Al-Okhdood	Total	25	0	1	0	0	0	0	0	26	0
Career total		375	22	32	4	11	1	94	19	512	46

== Honours ==
Corinthians

- Campeonato Brasileiro Série A: 2015

Al-Nassr

- Saudi Pro League: 2018–19
- Saudi Super Cup: 2019, 2020

Neom

- Saudi Second Division League: 2023–24
