= Eid Al-Muwallad =

Saudi Arabian footballer

Personal information
- Full name: Eid Mohammed Saeed Al-Muwallad
- Date of birth: 14 December 2001 (age 24)
- Place of birth: Jeddah, Saudi Arabia
- Height: 1.75 m (5 ft 9 in)
- Position: Defensive midfielder

Team information
- Current team: Al-Ahli
- Number: 6

Youth career
- Al-Ahli

Senior career*
Years	Team	Apps	(Gls)
2022–2025	Al-Okhdood	71	(2)
2025–	Al-Ahli	27	(0)
2026–	Al Faisaly (loan)	11	(0)

International career^{‡}
2023–	Saudi Arabia	2	(0)
- * Club domestic league appearances and goals as of 21 November 2026 ‡ National team caps and goals as of 30 January 2024

Eid Mohammed Saeed Al-Muwallad (Arabic: عيد محمد سعيد المولد; born 14 December 2001) is a Saudi Arabian professional footballer who plays as a defensive midfielder for Saudi Pro League club Al Faisaly on loan from Al-Ahli and the Saudi Arabia national team.

== Club career ==
Al-Muwallad began his career at the youth teams of Al-Ahli before joining the Ministry of Sport's scholarship programs to develop football talents in 2021. Following his return from the scholarship program, Al-Muwallad joined Saudi First Division League side Al-Okhdood on a one-year contract on 13 July 2022. He made 31 appearances and scored twice in the 2022–23 season, helping Al-Okhdood earn promotion to the Pro League for the first time in their history. Al-Muwallad was also awarded the Young Player of the Season award. On 14 August 2023, Al-Muwallad made his Pro League for Al-Okhdood debut in a 1–1 draw against Al-Shabab. On 9 September 2023, Al-Muwallad renewed his contract with Al-Okhdood until the end of the 2025–26 season.

On 31 January 2025, Al-Muwallad joined Al-Ahli on a three-year contract.

== International career ==
In October 2023, Al-Muwallad was called up for the Saudi Arabia national team for the first time ahead of the friendlies against Nigeria and Mali. He was an unused substitute in both games. In November 2023, Al-Muwallad was called up for the 2026 FIFA World Cup qualifiers against Pakistan and Jordan. On 21 November 2023, Al-Muwallad made his debut for the national team in the 2–0 win against Jordan. He came off the bench in the 65th minute replacing Saleh Al-Shehri.

== Career statistics ==
=== Club ===
As of match played 27 May 2024

Club	Season	League			King Cup		Continental		Other		Total	
Club	Season	Division	Apps	Goals	Apps	Goals	Apps	Goals	Apps	Goals	Apps	Goals
Al-Okhdood	2022–23	FDL	31	2	—		—		—		31	2
Al-Okhdood	2023–24	SPL	27	0	0	0	—		—		27	0
Al-Okhdood	Total		58	2	0	0	0	0	0	0	58	2
Career total			58	2	0	0	0	0	0	0	58	2

== Honours ==
Al-Ahli

- Saudi Super Cup: 2025
- AFC Champions League Elite: 2024–25

Individual

- Saudi First Division League Young Player of the Season: 2022–23
