= Yaseen Al-Zubaidi =

Saudi Arabian footballer

Personal information
- Full name: Yaseen Attiah Al-Zubaidi
- Date of birth: April 26, 2003 (age 23)
- Place of birth: Jeddah, Saudi Arabia
- Height: 1.76 m (5 ft 9 in)
- Position: Winger

Team information
- Current team: Al-Ahli
- Number: 26

Youth career
- Al-Ahli

Senior career*
Years	Team	Apps	(Gls)
2023–	Al-Ahli	3	(0)
2024	→ Al-Okhdood (loan)	12	(2)
2025	→ Al-Okhdood (loan)	15	(0)

International career
2021–2023	Saudi Arabia U20		
2023–	Saudi Arabia U23		
- * Club domestic league appearances and goals as of 30 December 2025

Yaseen Al-Zubaidi (Arabic: ياسين الزبيدي; born 26 April 2003) is a Saudi Arabian professional footballer who plays as a winger for Saudi Pro League side Al-Ahli.

== Club career ==
Al-Zubaidi started his career at Al-Ahli and signed his first professional contract with the club on 18 August 2021. He was called up to the first team in July 2023. On 1 February 2024, Al-Zubaidi joined Pro League side Al-Okhdood on a six-month loan. He made his debut on 1 March 2024 in the 2–1 loss to Al-Riyadh as an 83rd-minute substitute. On 27 April 2024, Al-Zubaidi made his first start for the club as well as score his first goal in a 4–0 win against Abha. On 17 May 2024, Al-Zubaidi scored his second goal in a 1–1 draw against Al-Ettifaq. He ended his loan spell at Al-Okhdood making 12 appearances and scoring twice. On 30 January 2025, Al-Zubaidi renewed his contract with Al-Ahli. On 31 January 2025, Al-Zubaidi joined Al-Okhdood on a six-month loan.

== Career statistics ==
=== Club ===
As of match played 26 May 2025

Club	Season	League		King Cup		Asia		Other		Total	
Club	Season	Apps	Goals	Apps	Goals	Apps	Goals	Apps	Goals	Apps	Goals
Al-Ahli	2023–24	0	0	0	0	—		—		0	0
Al-Ahli	2024–25	2	0	1	0	2	0	0	0	5	0
Al-Ahli	Total	2	0	1	0	2	0	0	0	5	0
Al-Okhdood (loan)	2023–24	12	2	0	0	—		—		12	2
Al-Okhdood (loan)	2024–25	15	0	0	0	—		—		15	0
Career totals		29	2	1	0	2	0	0	0	32	2
