= Andrei Burcă =

Romanian footballer (born 1993)

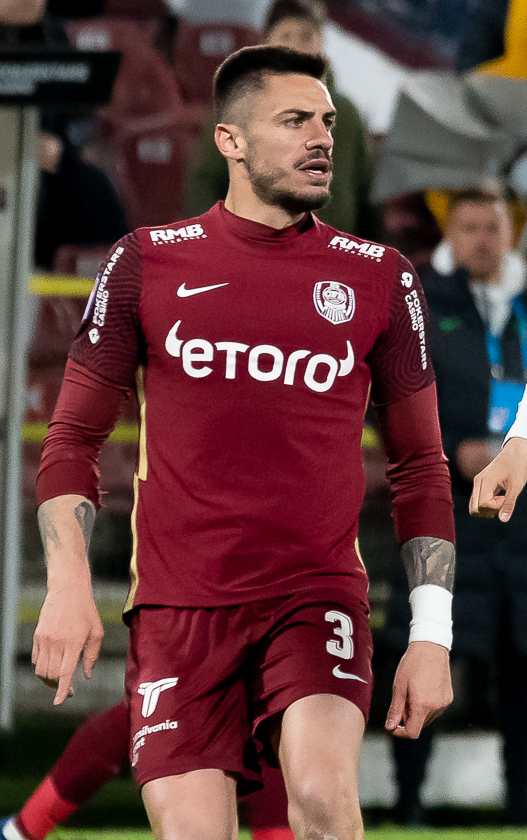
- Burcă with CFR Cluj in 2022

Personal information
- Full name: Andrei Andonie Burcă
- Date of birth: 15 April 1993 (age 33)
- Place of birth: Bacău, Romania
- Height: 1.88 m (6 ft 2 in)
- Position: Defender

Team information
- Current team: Yunnan Yukun
- Number: 33

Youth career
- 2001–2010: FCM Bacău

Senior career*
Years	Team	Apps	(Gls)
2010–2013	Aerostar Bacău	86	(7)
2013–2016	SC Bacău	71	(4)
2016–2019	Botoșani	104	(4)
2019–2023	CFR Cluj	114	(6)
2023–2024	Al-Okhdood	28	(6)
2024–2025	Baniyas	24	(1)
2025–	Yunnan Yukun	36	(1)

International career^{‡}
2019–	Romania	47	(1)
- * Club domestic league appearances and goals as of 8 November 2026 ‡ National team caps and goals as of 28 September 2026

Andrei Andonie Burcă (Romanian pronunciation: [anˈdrej ˈburkə]; born 15 April 1993) is a Romanian professional footballer who plays for Chinese Super League club Yunnan Yukun and the Romania national team. Mainly a centre-back, he can also be deployed as a left-back.

Burcă began his career in the lower divisions with his hometown clubs Aerostar Bacău and SC Bacău, before signing for top flight team Botoșani in 2016. Three years later, his good display earned him a transfer to defending champions CFR Cluj. He aided to four domestic trophies during his spell in Cluj-Napoca, and in 2023 moved abroad to Saudi club Al-Okhdood.

Burcă made his full international debut for Romania in September 2019, starting in a 3–2 UEFA Nations League victory over Austria. He represented the country in the Euro 2024.

== Club career ==
=== Early career and Botoșani ===
Burcă started his senior career with hometown club Aerostar Bacău, and then moved to neighbouring SC Bacău in 2013. He made his debut in the second tier of the Romanian league system on 14 September that year, in a 0–2 loss to CSM Studențesc Iași.

Following the conclusion of the 2015–16 season, his team withdrew from the championship because of financial issues; Burcă hence contemplated about retiring from football and starting college. He however received contract proposals from Foresta Suceava and Botoșani, and after signing with the latter he went on to amass over one hundred matches in the Liga I between 2016 and 2019.

=== CFR Cluj ===
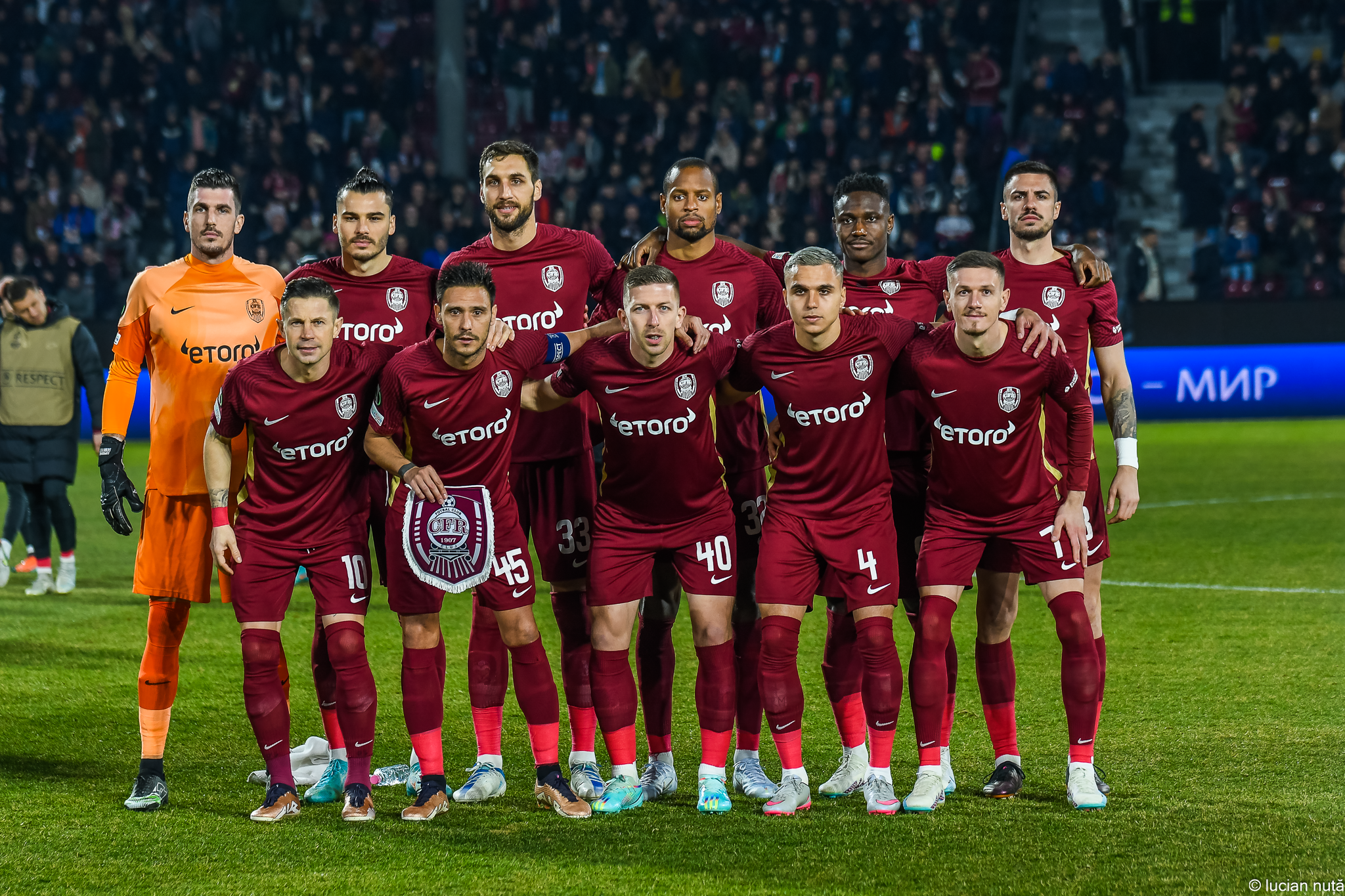
Burcă (back row, first from right) with CFR Cluj before a match against Lazio in the 2022–23 UEFA Europa Conference League knockout phase.

On 10 June 2019, Burcă joined reigning champions CFR Cluj for an undisclosed transfer fee. With "the Railwaymen", he was a starter in all eight matches in the 2019–20 edition of the UEFA Champions League qualifiers, as his team was eliminated in the play-off round by Slavia Prague. He also played in all eight Europa League games, scoring once in a 2–0 home victory over Scottish club Celtic on 12 December.

On 3 August 2020, Burcă won his first career trophy after a 3–1 success against Universitatea Craiova in the final Liga I fixture. On 15 April 2021, he started in the 4–1 penalty shoot-out defeat of FCSB in the Supercupa României.

=== Late career ===
On 17 July 2023, Burcă signed a one-year contract with Al-Okhdood, newly promoted to the Saudi Pro League. Media reported the transfer fee as being worth €1 million.

On 10 July 2024, Burcă joined UAE Pro League club Baniyas.

On 4 July 2025, Burcă signed with newly promoted Chinese Super League club Yunnan Yukun.

== International career ==
On 7 September 2020, Burcă recorded his debut for the Romania national team by playing the full 90 minutes as a right-back in a 3–2 UEFA Nations League away win over Austria.

Burcă scored his first international goal on 28 March 2023, in a 2–1 home victory over Belarus in the Euro 2024 qualifiers. He started in all ten matches of the competition, as Romania qualified to the final tournament from the first place in Group I.

On 7 June 2024, Burcă was named in Romania's squad for the Euro 2024. He started in all four matches of the tournament, forming a defensive partnership with Radu Drăgușin, as the nation won its group but was eliminated by the Netherlands in the round of 16.

== Career statistics ==
=== Club ===
As of match played 8 November 2026

Appearances and goals by club, season and competition
Club	Season	League			National cup (Note: Includes Cupa României, King's Cup, UAE President's Cup, Chinese FA Cup)		League cup (Note: Includes Cupa Ligii, UAE League Cup)		Continental		Other		Total	
Club	Season	Apps	Goals	Apps	Goals	Apps	Goals	Apps	Goals	Apps	Goals	Apps	Goals	Apps
Aerostar Bacău	2010–11	Liga III	25	1	0	0	—		—		—		25	1
Aerostar Bacău	2011–12	Liga III	30	2	0	0	—		—		—		30	2
Aerostar Bacău	2012–13	Liga III	31	4	0	0	—		—		—		31	4
Aerostar Bacău	Total		86	7	0	0	—		—		—		86	7
SC Bacău	2013–14	Liga II	25	1	1	0	—		—		—		26	1
SC Bacău	2014–15	Liga II	19	1	0	0	—		—		—		19	1
SC Bacău	2015–16	Liga II	27	2	1	0	—		—		—		28	2
SC Bacău	Total		71	4	2	0	—		—		—		73	4
Botoșani	2016–17	Liga I	27	1	1	0	1	0	—		—		29	1
Botoșani	2017–18	Liga I	38	1	5	0	—		—		—		43	1
Botoșani	2018–19	Liga I	39	2	1	0	—		—		—		40	2
Botoșani	Total		104	4	7	0	1	0	—		—		112	4
CFR Cluj	2019–20	Liga I	21	2	1	1	—		16 (Note: Eight appearances in UEFA Champions League, eight appearances in UEFA Europa League)	1	0	0	38	4
CFR Cluj	2020–21	Liga I	35	2	0	0	—		9 (Note: Two appearances in UEFA Champions League, seven appearances in UEFA Europa League)	0	1 (Note: Appearance in Supercupa României)	0	45	2
CFR Cluj	2021–22	Liga I	30	2	0	0	—		6 (Note: Appearances in UEFA Europa Conference League)	0	0	0	36	2
CFR Cluj	2022–23	Liga I	28	0	2	0	—		14 (Note: Two appearances in UEFA Champions League, twelve appearances in UEFA Europa Conference League)	0	0	0	44	0
CFR Cluj	Total		114	6	3	1	—		45	1	1	0	163	8
Al-Okhdood	2023–24	Saudi Pro League	28	6	1	0	—		—		—		29	6
Baniyas	2024–25	UAE Pro League	24	1	2	0	3	0	—		—		29	1
Yunnan Yukun	2025	Chinese Super League	9	0	2	0	—		—		—		11	0
Yunnan Yukun	2026	Chinese Super League	27	1	4	0	—		—		—		31	1
Yunnan Yukun	Total		36	1	6	0	—		—		—		42	1
Career total			463	29	21	1	2	0	45	1	3	0	534	31

=== International ===
As of match played 28 September 2026

Appearances and goals by national team and year
National team	Year	Apps	Goals
Romania	2020	4	0
Romania	2021	4	0
Romania	2022	7	0
Romania	2023	10	1
Romania	2024	12	0
Romania	2025	7	0
Romania	2026	3	0
Total		47	1

Scores and results list Romania's goal tally first, score column indicates score after each Burcă goal.

List of international goals scored by Andrei Burcă
No.	Date	Venue	Opponent	Score	Result	Competition
1	28 March 2023	Arena Națională, Bucharest, Romania	Belarus	2–0	2–1	UEFA Euro 2024 qualification

== Honours ==
CFR Cluj

- Liga I: 2019–20, 2020–21, 2021–22
- Supercupa României: 2020; runner-up: 2019, 2021, 2022

Individual

- Liga I Team of the Season: 2019–20, 2020–21, 2021–22
