= Paulo Vítor (footballer, born 1988) =

Brazilian footballer

Personal information
- Full name: Paulo Vítor Fagundes dos Anjos
- Date of birth: 21 November 1988 (age 37)
- Place of birth: São Mateus, Brazil
- Height: 1.95 m (6 ft 5 in)
- Position: Goalkeeper

Team information
- Current team: Atletico Goianiense

Youth career
- 2008: Audax Rio

Senior career*
Years	Team	Apps	(Gls)
2009–2011	Vitória-ES		
2012	Botafogo-SP		
2013	Aracruz	3	(0)
2014	Audax Rio	5	(0)
2015	Rio Branco	8	(0)
2016–2018	Varzim	80	(1)
2018–2020	Rio Ave	1	(0)
2020–2023	Chaves	91	(0)
2023–2025	Al-Okhdood	63	(0)
2025–	Atletico Goianiense	36	(0)
- * Club domestic league appearances and goals as of 16 April 2026

Paulo Vítor Fagundes dos Anjos, known as Paulo Vítor (born 21 November 1988) is a Brazilian professional footballer who plays as a goalkeeper for Atletico Goianiense.

== Club career ==
He made his professional debut in the Segunda Liga for Varzim on 9 March 2016 in a game against Académico de Viseu.

On 14 June 2023, Vítor joined Saudi Pro League club Al-Okhdood on a free transfer.
