= Prince Hathloul bin Abdulaziz Sports City Stadium =

Sports venue in Najran, Saudi Arabia

Prince Hathloul bin Abdulaziz Sports City Stadium ملعب مدينة الأمير هذلول بن عبد العزيز الرياضية
- Interactive map of Prince Hathloul bin Abdulaziz Sports City Stadium ملعب مدينة الأمير هذلول بن عبد العزيز الرياضية
- Full name: Prince Hathloul bin Abdulaziz Sports City Stadium
- Location: Najran, Saudi Arabia
- Coordinates: 17°39′25.8372″N 44°28′39.1224″E
- Owner: Ministry of Sport
- Operator: Ministry of Sport
- Capacity: 10,000
- Surface: Grass

Construction
- Groundbreaking: 24 January 2008
- Built: 2013–2020
- Opened: 31 August 2020
- Cost: SAR124 million

Tenants
- Al-Okhdood (2020–present); Najran S.FC (2020–present)

Prince Hathloul bin Abdulaziz Sports City Stadium is a multi-purpose stadium in Najran, Saudi Arabia. It is used mostly for football matches. It is the home stadium of Al-Okhdood and Najran S.FC has a capacity of 10,000.

== History ==
Plans to build a sports complex in Najran were announced on 24 January 2008. The sports complex would be known as Najran Sports City would include a 10,000 seater football stadium, an olympic-size swimming pool, a sports hall to host basketball, volleyball and handball matches, a gymnasium and an 80-room hostel among others amenities. However, construction was delayed and no work was done on the sports complex. On 9 October 2011, it was announced by the then-president of the General Sports Authority (GSA) Prince Nawaf bin Faisal Al Saud that construction would begin sometime in 2012. On 1 January 2012, it was announced that the stadium's design plans were being modified following an approval on the increase of capacity from 10,000 to 20,000 seats. Construction on the stadium began sometime in 2013. On 25 December 2019, it was announced that work on the stadium was mostly done. On 31 August 2020, the sports complex was officially opened under the name of Prince Hathloul bin Abdul Aziz Sports City.

On 17 November 2020, the first official match was held on the stadium. Najran S.FC defeated Al-Thoqbah 2–1 in the 5th round of the MS League. On 28 November 2020, Al-Okhdood hosted Al-Qaisumah in their first match at the stadium.

The stadium is named after Hathloul bin Abdulaziz Al Saud.

== See also ==
- List of football stadiums in Saudi Arabia
