= Ahmed Mostafa (footballer, born 1997) =

Egyptian footballer

Personal information
- Full name: Ahmed Mostafa Taher
- Date of birth: 21 October 1997 (age 29)
- Place of birth: Egypt
- Height: 1.73 m (5 ft 8 in)
- Position: Attacking midfielder

Team information
- Current team: Modern Sport
- Number: 14

Senior career*
Years	Team	Apps	(Gls)
2017–2018	Petrojet	5	(0)
2017–2018	→ El Dakhleya (loan)	28	(3)
2018–2020	Gent	1	(0)
2019	→ Smouha (loan)	7	(0)
2019–2020	→ Abha (loan)	5	(0)
2020	→ Al-Adalah (loan)	5	(0)
2020–2022	Ismaily	36	(2)
2022	Smouha	1	(1)
2023–2024	→ Al-Okhdood (loan)	8	(0)
2024–	Modern Sport	8	(0)

International career
2017	Egypt U20	2	(0)
2018–2019	Egypt U23	3	(0)
- * Club domestic league appearances and goals as of 16:47, 7 February 2026 (UTC)

Ahmed Mostafa Taher (born 21 October 1997) is an Egyptian professional footballer who plays as an attacking midfielder for Modern Sport.

== Professional career ==
Mostafa joined Gent on 31 May 2018 from Petrojet for a fee around $550,000. Mostafa made his professional debut with Gent in a 3–0 Belgian First Division A win over Cercle Brugge on 2 September 2018. On 25 January 2019, Mostafa was loaned out to Smouha SC for the rest of the season in order for him get some valuable match experience. Mostafa had struggled for game time, featuring just eight minutes with the first-team. He later played in Saudi Arabia for Abha and Al-Adalah, before returning to Egypt to sign for Ismaily.

On 21 July 2023, Mostafa joined Al-Okhdood on a one-year loan.

== International career ==
Mostafa represented the Egypt U20s at the 2017 Africa U-20 Cup of Nations.
