= Engin =

Engin is a masculine given name and surname of Turkish origin. It means vast or open sea in Turkish. Notable people with the name include:

== Given name ==
- Engin Deniz Akarlı (1945–2026), Turkish-American historian
- Engin Can Aksoy (born 2003), Turkish footballer
- Engin Akyürek (born 1981), Turkish actor
- Engin Alan (born 1945), Turkish Army general
- Engin Alkan (born 1965), Turkish actor
- Engin Altay (born 1963), Turkish politician
- Engin Ardıç (1952–2023), Turkish writer and journalist
- Engin Arık (1948–2007), Turkish physicist
- Engin Ali Artan (born 1992), Turkish figure skater
- Engin Atsür (born 1984), Turkish basketball player
- Engin Baytar (born 1983), Turkish footballer
- Engin Bekdemir (born 1992), Turkish footballer
- Engin Benli (born 1970), Turkish actor
- Engin Can Biterge (born 2007), Turkish footballer
- Engin Çağlar (1940–2025), Turkish actor
- Engin Çeber (1979–2008), Turkish human rights activist
- Engin Cezzar (1935–2017), Turkish director
- Engin Çınar (born 1954), Turkish footballer
- Engin Altan Düzyatan (born 1979), Turkish actor
- Engin Eroglu, German politician
- Engin Fırat (1970–2026), Turkish football player and manager
- Engin Günaydın (born 1972), Turkish actor and comedian
- Engin Güngör (born 1986), Turkish footballer
- Engin Hepileri (born 1978), Turkish actor
- Engin İpekoğlu (born 1961), Turkish footballer
- Engin Korukır (born 1958), Turkish football manager
- Engin Noyan (born 1953), Turkish musician
- Engin Nurşani (1984–2020), Turkish-German musician
- Engin Oeztuerk (born 1973), German–Turkish musician
- Engin Özdemir (born 1968), Turkish footballer
- Engin Öztonga (born 1978), Turkish footballer
- Engin Öztürk (born 1987), Turkish actor
- Engin Ünal (born 1936), Turkish swimmer
- Engin Verel (born 1956), Turkish footballer
- Engin Yadigar (born 1944), Turkish boxer
- Engin Yanova (born 1977), German-Turkish football coach
- Engin Yıldırım (born 1966), Turkish professor and judge
- Engin Yılmaz (born 1977), Turkish politician

== Surname ==
- Ahmet Engin (born 1996), German football player
- Atilla Engin (1946–2019), Turkish-American fusion jazz musician
- Dilek Engin (born 1981), German politician
- Esin Engin (1945–1997), Turkish musician
- Kenan Engin (born 1974), German-Turkish political scientist
- Korel Engin (born 1980), Turkish basketball player
- Engin Yıldırım (born 1966), Turkish labor economics professor and the vice-president of the Constitutional Court of Turkey
- Engin Yılmaz (born 1977), Turkish politician

== See also ==
- ENGIN-X, dedicated materials engineering beamline at the ISIS neutron source
- Engin Blindé du Génie, armoured engineering vehicle
- Engin de débarquement amphibie rapide, Roll-on/Roll-off catamaran landing crafts
