= Alexander Bade =

German footballer and goalkeeping coach

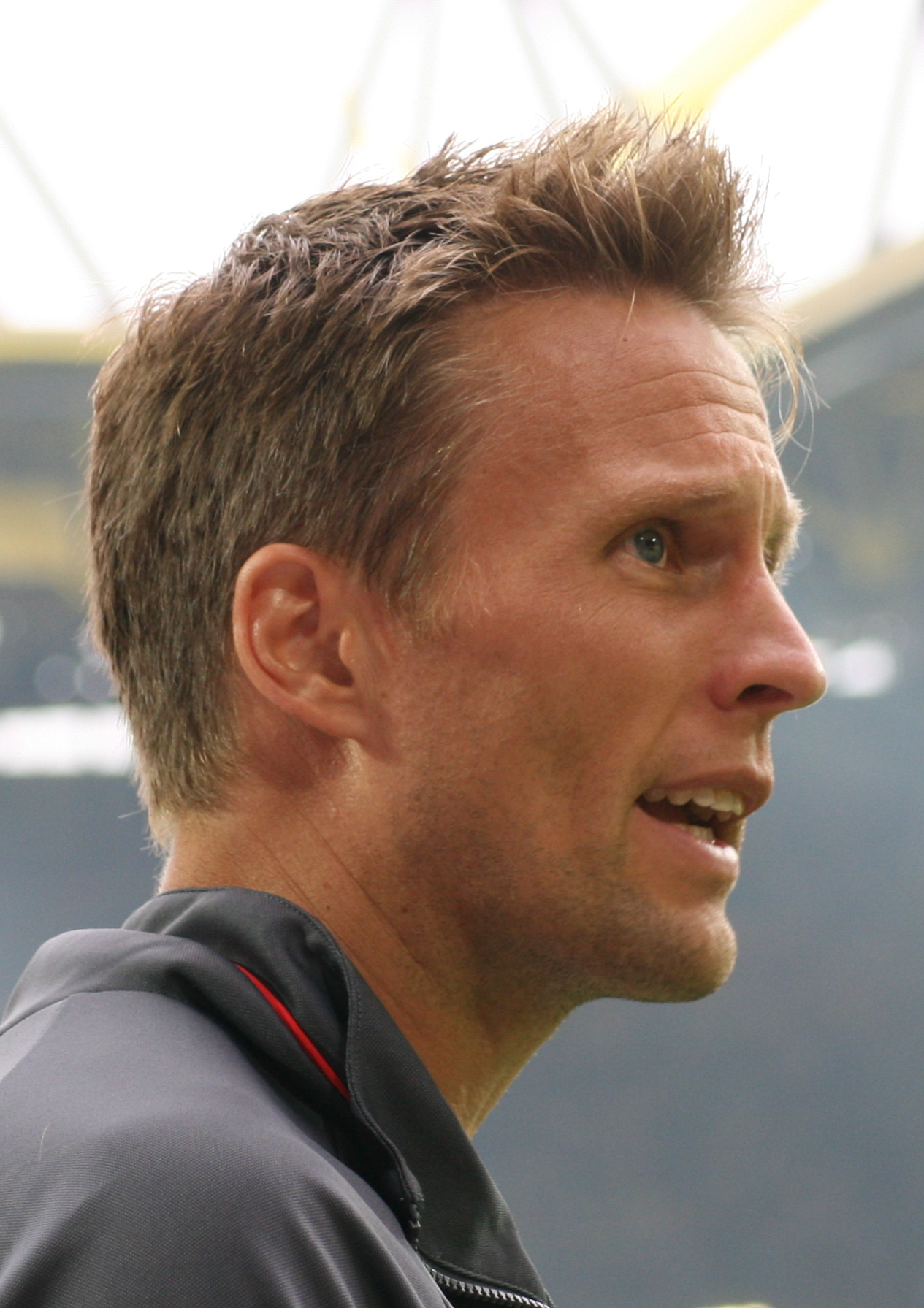
- Bade in 2009

Personal information
- Full name: Alexander Bade
- Date of birth: 25 August 1970 (age 56)
- Place of birth: West Berlin, West Germany
- Height: 1.96 m (6 ft 5 in)
- Position: Goalkeeper

Team information
- Current team: Newcastle United (goalkeeping coach)

Youth career
- –1988: Tennis Borussia Berlin
- 1988–1991: 1. FC Köln

Senior career*
Years	Team	Apps	(Gls)
1991–1994	1. FC Köln	5	(0)
1994–1998	KFC Uerdingen 05	62	(0)
1998–2000	Hamburger SV	0	(0)
2000–2006	1. FC Köln	90	(0)
2006–2007	VfL Bochum	5	(0)
2007–2008	SC Paderborn 07	13	(0)
2008	Borussia Dortmund	1	(0)
2008–2009	Arminia Bielefeld	0	(0)
Total		176	(0)

Managerial career
- 2009–2018: 1. FC Köln (goalkeeping coach)
- 2018: Borussia Dortmund (assistant coach)
- 2019–2020: Austria Wien (sporting coordinator)
- 2020–2021: Austria Wien (goalkeeping coach)
- 2021: Ferencváros (assistant coach)
- 2022–2023: Viktoria Köln (goalkeeping coach)
- 2023–2026: Al-Ahli (goalkeeping coach)
- 2026–: Newcastle United (goalkeeping coach)
- * Club domestic league appearances and goals

Alexander Bade (born 25 August 1970) is a German football coach and former professional footballer who is the goalkeeping coach of Premier League club Newcastle United.

He played as a goalkeeper and made 176 league appearances during a professional career spanning from 1991 to 2009, including two spells with 1. FC Köln.

After retiring from playing, Bade worked for nine years as goalkeeping coach at Köln. He has subsequently held coaching and football-development positions in Germany, Austria, Hungary and Saudi Arabia.

== Playing career ==
Bade was born in West Berlin and began playing football with Tennis Borussia Berlin. He joined the youth system of 1. FC Köln in 1988 and was promoted to the senior squad in 1991.

At Köln, Bade served primarily as understudy to Germany international Bodo Illgner. He made five Bundesliga appearances during his first spell with the club before joining KFC Uerdingen 05 in 1994. He initially competed with Bernd Dreher for the goalkeeper position at Uerdingen and made 62 league appearances during four seasons with the club.

In 1998, Bade moved to Hamburger SV, where Hans-Jörg Butt was the established first-choice goalkeeper. Bade did not make a league appearance during his two seasons in Hamburg and returned to Köln in 2000.

During his second spell with Köln, Bade made 90 league appearances. He was the club's regular goalkeeper during its promotion campaigns from the 2. Bundesliga in 2002–03 and 2004–05.

Following Köln's relegation from the Bundesliga in 2006, Bade joined VfL Bochum. He spent one season with Bochum before moving to SC Paderborn 07 in 2007.

In January 2008, Borussia Dortmund signed Bade until the end of the season after first-choice goalkeeper Roman Weidenfeller underwent shoulder surgery. He was recruited as cover for Marc Ziegler.

Bade made his only appearance for Dortmund against Schalke 04 on 10 February 2008, replacing the injured Ziegler at half-time.

He joined Arminia Bielefeld in September 2008 as experienced cover following a serious injury to Rowen Fernandez. Bade did not make a competitive appearance for the club and retired from professional football at the end of the 2008–09 season.

== Coaching career ==
=== 1. FC Köln ===
After retiring as a player in 2009, Bade joined the coaching staff of 1. FC Köln. He worked primarily with the club's goalkeepers and later became part of the first-team coaching structure.

Bade remained at Köln for almost nine years and worked under several head coaches. From 2013 to 2017, he was part of Peter Stöger's coaching staff as the club won promotion to the Bundesliga in the 2013–14 season and later qualified for the 2017–18 UEFA Europa League.

His contract with Köln was terminated at the end of January 2018 following the appointment of Andreas Menger as the club's new goalkeeping coach.

=== Borussia Dortmund ===
On 1 February 2018, Bade joined Borussia Dortmund as an assistant coach until the end of the 2017–18 season. He was reunited with Stöger and assistant coach Manfred Schmid, with whom he had previously worked at Köln.

Bade's role at Dortmund was a general first-team assistant position rather than that of goalkeeping coach. He left the club following Stöger's departure at the end of the season.

=== Austria Wien ===
In August 2019, Bade joined Austria Wien as sporting coordinator. He worked alongside sporting executive Peter Stöger and sporting director Ralf Muhr, with responsibilities across the club's sporting structure and first-team operations.

Ahead of the 2020–21 season, Stöger became Austria Wien's head coach and appointed Bade as the first-team goalkeeping coach. Bade continued to hold responsibilities within the club's sporting department while joining a coaching staff that also included assistant coaches Gerhard Fellner and Jochen Fallmann.

The Austrian Football Association records Bade as Austria Wien's goalkeeping coach from 21 August 2020 until 30 June 2021.

=== Ferencváros ===
In June 2021, Bade followed Stöger to Hungarian champions Ferencváros. He joined the first-team staff as an assistant coach alongside Gerhard Fellner and long-serving club coach Csaba Máté.

Although Bade had previously worked as a specialist goalkeeping coach, Ferencváros described his position as a first-team or field coach rather than goalkeeping coach.

During his time in Budapest, Ferencváros reached the group stage of the 2021–22 UEFA Europa League. Bade left the club in December 2021 when Stöger and the other members of his immediate coaching staff were dismissed.

=== Viktoria Köln ===
In November 2022, Bade returned to coaching when he was appointed goalkeeping coach of Viktoria Köln. He joined the staff of head coach Olaf Janßen and succeeded Georg Koch, who moved into the position of team manager.

Bade remained with the 3. Liga club until August 2023, when he left to join Al-Ahli in the Saudi Pro League. Viktoria appointed Michael Kraft as his replacement.

=== Al-Ahli ===
In August 2023, Bade joined Saudi Pro League club Al-Ahli as goalkeeping coach after being recruited by newly appointed head coach Matthias Jaissle. He became part of a coaching staff that also included assistant coaches Alexander Hauser, Engin Yanova and Florens Koch.

As goalkeeping coach, Bade worked with international goalkeepers including Édouard Mendy and Abdulrahman Al-Sanbi. During his three seasons at the club, Al-Ahli established themselves among the leading teams in Saudi Arabia and won the AFC Champions League Elite in consecutive seasons, defeating Kawasaki Frontale in the 2025 final and Machida Zelvia in the 2026 final. The club also won the 2025 Saudi Super Cup.

=== Newcastle United ===
On 6 August 2026, Bade joined Premier League club Newcastle United as goalkeeping coach following the appointment of Matthias Jaissle as head coach. He was one of six members of Jaissle's coaching staff to move from Al-Ahli to Newcastle, alongside assistant coaches Alexander Hauser, Engin Yanova and Florens Koch, and performance analysts Maximilian Fischer and Steffen Konrad.

His appointment reunited him with Jaissle, with whom he had previously worked at Al-Ahli. Bade became responsible for the development and preparation of Newcastle United's first-team goalkeepers as part of the club's new coaching structure.

== Career statistics ==
Appearances and goals by club, season and competition
Club	Season	League			Cup		Europe		Other		Total	
Club	Season	Division	Apps	Goals	Apps	Goals	Apps	Goals	Apps	Goals	Apps	Goals
1. FC Köln	1989–90	Bundesliga	0	0	0	0	0	0	—		0	0
1. FC Köln	1990–91	Bundesliga	1	0	0	0	—		—		1	0
1. FC Köln	1991–92	Bundesliga	4	0	0	0	0	0	—		4	0
1. FC Köln	1992–93	Bundesliga	0	0	0	0	—		—		0	0
1. FC Köln	Total		5	0	0	0	0	0	—		5	0
KFC Uerdingen 05	1994–95	Bundesliga	0	0	1	0	—		—		1	0
KFC Uerdingen 05	1995–96	Bundesliga	5	0	1	0	—		—		6	0
KFC Uerdingen 05	1996–97	2. Bundesliga	24	0	1	0	—		—		25	0
KFC Uerdingen 05	1997–98	2. Bundesliga	33	0	4	0	—		—		37	0
KFC Uerdingen 05	Total		62	0	7	0	—		—		69	0
Hamburger SV	1998–99	Bundesliga	0	0	0	0	—		—		0	0
Hamburger SV	1999–2000	Bundesliga	0	0	0	0	0	0	—		0	0
Hamburger SV	Total		0	0	0	0	0	0	—		0	0
1. FC Köln	2000–01	Bundesliga	5	0	0	0	—		—		5	0
1. FC Köln	2001–02	Bundesliga	10	0	1	0	—		—		11	0
1. FC Köln	2002–03	2. Bundesliga	32	0	0	0	—		—		32	0
1. FC Köln	2003–04	Bundesliga	3	0	3	0	—		—		6	0
1. FC Köln	2004–05	2. Bundesliga	27	0	1	0	—		—		28	0
1. FC Köln	2005–06	Bundesliga	13	0	0	0	—		—		13	0
1. FC Köln	Total		90	0	5	0	—		—		95	0
VfL Bochum	2006–07	Bundesliga	5	0	2	0	—		—		7	0
SC Paderborn 07	2007–08	2. Bundesliga	13	0	1	0	—		—		14	0
Borussia Dortmund	2007–08	Bundesliga	1	0	0	0	—		—		1	0
Arminia Bielefeld	2008–09	Bundesliga	0	0	0	0	—		—		0	0
Career total			176	0	15	0	0	0	0	0	191	0

== Honours ==
Player

1. FC Köln

- 2. Bundesliga: 2002–03, 2004–05

Coach

1. FC Köln

- 2. Bundesliga: 2013–14 (promotion)

Al-Ahli

- AFC Champions League Elite: 2024–25, 2025–26
- Saudi Super Cup: 2025
