= Engin Yanova =

German football coach

- Yanova in 2026

Personal information
- Date of birth: 6 April 1977 (age 49)
- Place of birth: Berlin, West Germany
- Position: Forward

Team information
- Current team: Newcastle United (assistant coach)

Senior career*
Years	Team	Apps	(Gls)
1997–1998	SG Bornim		
1998–1999	SC Charlottenburg		

Managerial career
- 2008–2011: Union Berlin U19 (head coach)
- 2011–2013: Union Berlin II (head coach)
- 2013–2014: Berliner AK 07 (head coach)
- 2015–2019: Bavarian Football Association (association coach)
- 2020–2023: Bavarian Football Association (head coach)
- 2023–2026: Al-Ahli (assistant)
- 2026–: Newcastle United (assistant)
- * Club domestic league appearances and goals

Engin Yanova (born 6 April 1977) is a Turkish/German football coach who is an assistant coach at Premier League club Newcastle United.

He previously worked in youth and senior football in Berlin before spending eight years with the Bavarian Football Association (BFV), where he became head coach in 2020. He has also served on the coaching staffs of several German youth national teams.

== Playing career ==
Yanova played youth football in Berlin, including spells with Hertha Zehlendorf and Tennis Borussia Berlin. He later played as a forward for SG Bornim during the 1997–98 season and SC Charlottenburg in 1998–99. He also represented the Berlin regional selection on 40 occasions.

== Coaching career ==
=== Early career and Union Berlin ===
After beginning his coaching career in Berlin youth football with Lichterfelder FC , Yanova joined Union Berlin and coached Union's U19 side in the A-Junioren Bundesliga, before taking charge of Union Berlin II in 2011.

=== Berliner AK ===
In 2013, Yanova became head coach of Berliner AK 07.

=== Bavarian Football Association ===
In September 2015, Yanova joined the Bavarian Football Association (BFV) as an association coach. His work included coaching Bavarian representative teams and involvement in the education and development of coaches.

Yanova completed the German Football Association's football coaching qualification in 2015, graduating with a final grade of 1.3.

Alongside his work for the BFV, Yanova served on the coaching staffs of several German youth national teams. By 2019, he was working as an assistant coach to Manuel Baum with the Germany under-20 team. His national-team work also included roles with Germany's under-18 and under-19 teams.

In 2019, Yanova coached the BFV representative team that represented Germany at the UEFA Regions' Cup. The team defeated France, drew with Slovakia and beat Turkey in the group stage to reach the final, becoming the first German representative to do so. They finished as runners-up after losing 3–2 to the Lower Silesia region of Poland in the final.

On 1 January 2020, Yanova became the BFV's head coach. In addition to overseeing representative teams, he was given responsibility for the further development of the association's coaching education programmes and worked on the BFV's sporting development strategy.

Yanova continued to combine his BFV responsibilities with work for the German youth national teams. His assignments included assistant coaching roles with the under-18, under-19 and under-20 teams.

In 2023, Yanova again led the Bavarian representative team at the UEFA Regions' Cup finals, held in Galicia, Spain. Bavaria finished third in the tournament.

Yanova left the BFV in August 2023 after almost eight years with the association to join Saudi Pro League club Al-Ahli.

=== Al-Ahli ===
In August 2023, Yanova joined Saudi Pro League club Al-Ahli as an assistant coach to Matthias Jaissle. Yanova was among the coaches recruited by Jaissle shortly after the German had taken charge of the club.

As part of Jaissle's coaching staff, Yanova helped Al-Ahli win the 2024–25 AFC Champions League Elite, with the club defeating Kawasaki Frontale 2–0 in the final. Al-Ahli retained the title the following season, winning the 2025–26 AFC Champions League Elite.

=== Newcastle United ===
In August 2026, Yanova followed Jaissle to Premier League club Newcastle United, joining his coaching staff as an assistant coach. He moved to England alongside several members of Jaissle's former Al-Ahli staff, including Alexander Hauser, Florens Koch and goalkeeping coach Alexander Bade.

== Honours ==
Coach

Bavarian Football Association

- UEFA Regions' Cup runner-up: 2019
- UEFA Regions' Cup third place: 2023

Al-Ahli

- AFC Champions League Elite: 2024–25, 2025–26
