= Noyan (disambiguation) =

Noyan may refer to one of the following.

- Noyan, Quebec, Canada
- Noyan, a title of authority in Central Asia, including:
  - Baiju Noyan (died 1260), Mongolian Commander.
    - Baycu Noyan (fictional character), a character in Diriliş: Ertuğrul based on Baiju Noyan.
  - Chormaqan Noyan, or Chormagan Noyan, (died 1241), Mongolian General.
  - Jebei Noyan, or Jebe or Chepe Noyan, (died 1225), Mongolian General.
  - Kitbuqa Noyan (died 1260), Mongolian soldier.
- Engin Noyan, Turkish musician.
- Abbas Noyan, Afghan Politician.

== See also ==
- Noyon, Oise, France
