= Ahmet Reyiz Yılmaz =

Turkish businessman, economist (born 1968)

Leader of the Conservative Ascension Party
- Incumbent
- Assumed office 24 January 2013
- President: Engin Yılmaz
- Preceded by: Position established

Leader of the Nationalist and Conservative Party
- In office 3 March 2010 – 24 January 2013
- Preceded by: Position established
- Succeeded by: Position abolished

Personal details
- Born: 4 August 1968 (age 58) Rize, Turkey
- Party: Nationalist Movement Party (2005–2009); Nationalist and Conservative Party (2010–2013); Conservative Ascension Party (2013–present)
- Education: Anadolu University
- Occupation: Author, economist, politician
- Website: http://www.ahmetreyizyilmaz.com

Ahmet Reyiz Yılmaz (born 4 August 1968 in Rize) is a Turkish businessman, economist, leader of the Conservative Ascention Party.

Yılmaz is a graduate of the Anadolu University Department of Economics and Administrative Sciences. He has completed leading strategic projects programme at Oxford University.He has participated in some certified programs on the Business Management abroad and in panels as a Middle East expert. He is the writer of Abraham's Fight, The Turkish-Islamic case/ Realities Of İsraelities, published in 2012.

He speaks English and Hebrew.

== Professional life ==
In 1988, he was involved in mid level construction work. In 1992, he went to Israel for business. A short time later he returned and continued to work in the family construction company that they had established in Turkey.

Ahmet Reyiz Yılmaz, who undertook his first project abroad in Israel in 1994 followed by many other successful international projects that he accomplished by establishing his own company, was on the cover of Israel's largest Globes magazine read by Jews worldwide with the title of "The Last Remaining Ottoman in Israel". Yılmaz received this title with many accomplished works left behind him in various points throughout Israel during a 16-year process. One of these projects is the Azrieli Center, the tallest business center in the Middle East. During the 1996 term Yılmaz established the Israel Turkish Contractors Union together with the Israel-Turkey Attaché. Currently he is producing construction, contract and investment projects in Israel, Poland, Romania and Turkey.

== Entry into politics ==
As the result of an invitation from then Nationalist Movement Party (Turkish: Miiliyetçi Hareket Partisi, MHP) Group Deputy Leader and Erzurum Parliamentarian İsmail Köse to join MHP, Ahmet Reyiz Yılmaz met with MHP General Leader Devlet Bahçeli. After this meeting, on the approval and recommendation of Bahçeli, he became a party member from the province of Çankaya in 2005. Between the years of 2005–2006, Yılmaz accomplished important works in the MHP General Headquarters, the TBMM (Grand National Assembly of Turkey) and the Government Monitoring Committee, in charge of economy and foreign politics under the leadership of Köse. He resigned his duty from this party. His ideas were collected by himself in his well-known book Abraham's Fight, The Turkish-Islamic case/ Realities Of İsraelities.

== Contributions to Turkish history in Israel ==
Yılmaz has provided many cultural services in Israel for the purpose of contributing to the assets of Turkey. One of the most significant ones is the restoration to the original form of the Turkish Governor's Mansion (the Government Building of the time), which had been demolished with bombs by the British and local insurgents after the land, which is now Israel, had been handed over by the Ottomans with a flag transfer to the British in 1917; and its delivery to the Turkish Embassy with the Turkish flag installed at the front.

Additionally many monuments were made to revitalize the Turkish and Ottoman footprints in Israel.

== Successes and awards ==
In 2005, he and his company were chosen from among 400 local Israeli businessmen and companies by the Israel Business Commission as "The Best Company of the Year" and "Businessman of the Year".

In 2008, he was selected by Turkish magazine Ekovitrin as the most successful businessman of the year and won their "Star of the Year" award in Israel.
