= New Turkey Party (current) =

New Turkey Party Yeni Türkiye Partisi
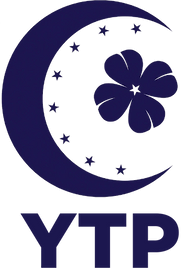
- Abbreviation: YTP
- Leader: Ahmet Reyiz Yılmaz
- President: Engin Yılmaz
- General secretary: Muhammet Recep Altun
- Founded: January 24, 2013; 13 years ago
- Preceded by: Nationalist and Conservative Party
- Headquarters: Ankara, Turkey
- Membership (2026): ▼9,596
- Ideology: Conservatism; Social conservatism Economic nationalism Right-wing populism Euroscepticism
- Political position: Right-wing
- Colours: Blue and white

Website
- www.yeniturkiyepartisi.com

New Turkey Party (Turkish: Yeni Türkiye Partisi, abbreviated YTP) or formerly known as Conservative Ascension Party (Turkish: Muhafazakâr Yükseliş Partisi), is a Turkish nationalist and conservative political party formed on 24 January 2013, succeeding the Nationalist and Conservative Party. Under the leadership of Engin Yılmaz, the party contested the 2014 local elections and won 1,834 votes, unable to win any councillors or municipalities. In preparation for the June 2015 general election, the party has called for a triple alliance between themselves, the Nationalist Movement Party (MHP) and the Great Union Party (BBP).

The YTP is Eurosceptic and puts forward the view that the Turkish Republic of Northern Cyprus should become an independent and globally recognised sovereign state. Despite being a party situated on the political right, the YTP has criticised the 'liberal economics' pursued by the Justice and Development Party (AKP) government and blamed unemployment, a loss of workers' rights as well as the heavy surge in public debt on privatisation.

In February 2023, party changed its name to "New Turkey Party".
