= Eskişehir Zoo =

Zoo in Eskişehir, Turkey

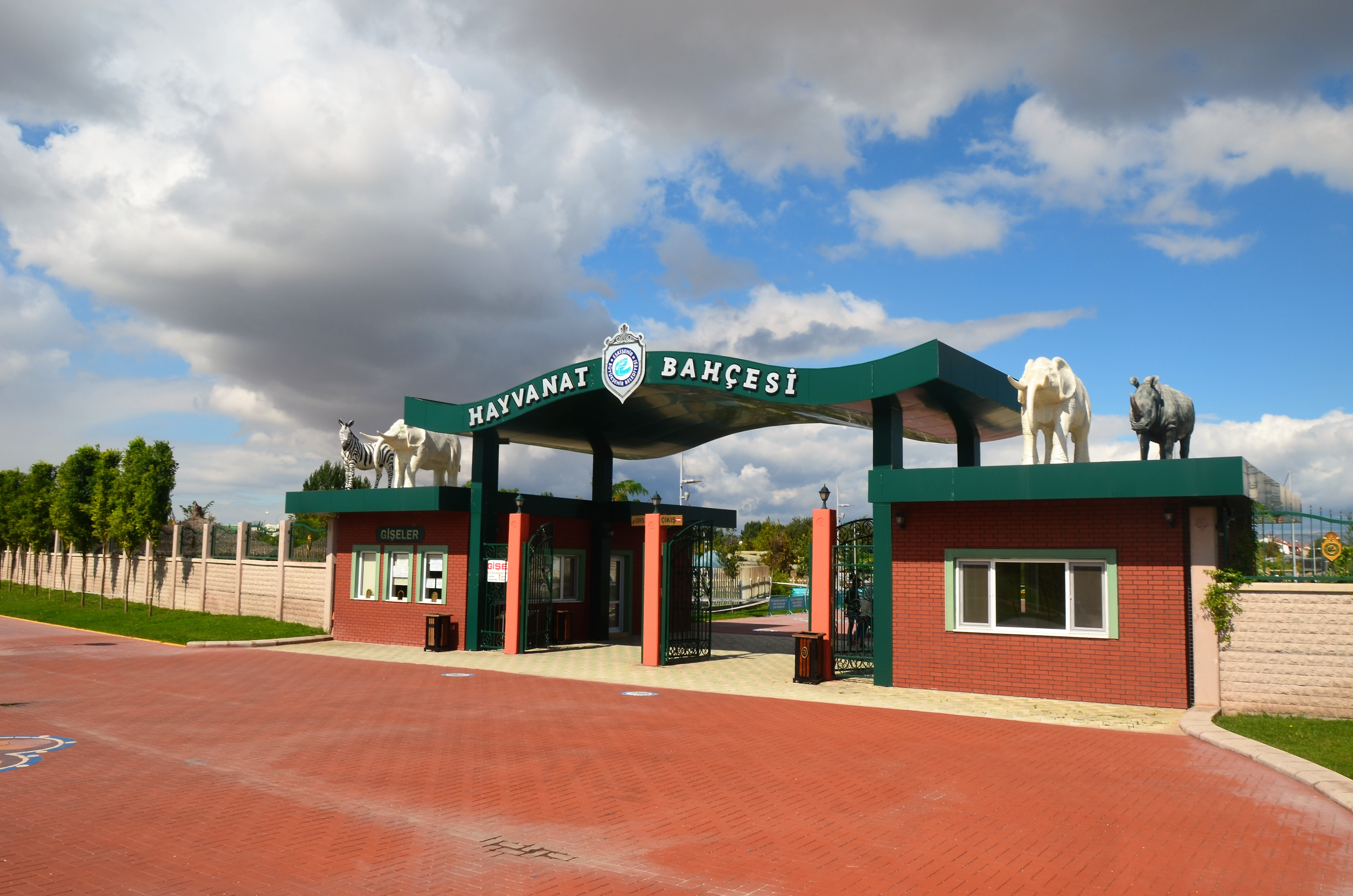
Zoo entrance

Eskişehir Zoo (Turkish: Eskişehir Hayvanat Bahçesi) is an animal park in Eskişehir, Turkey.

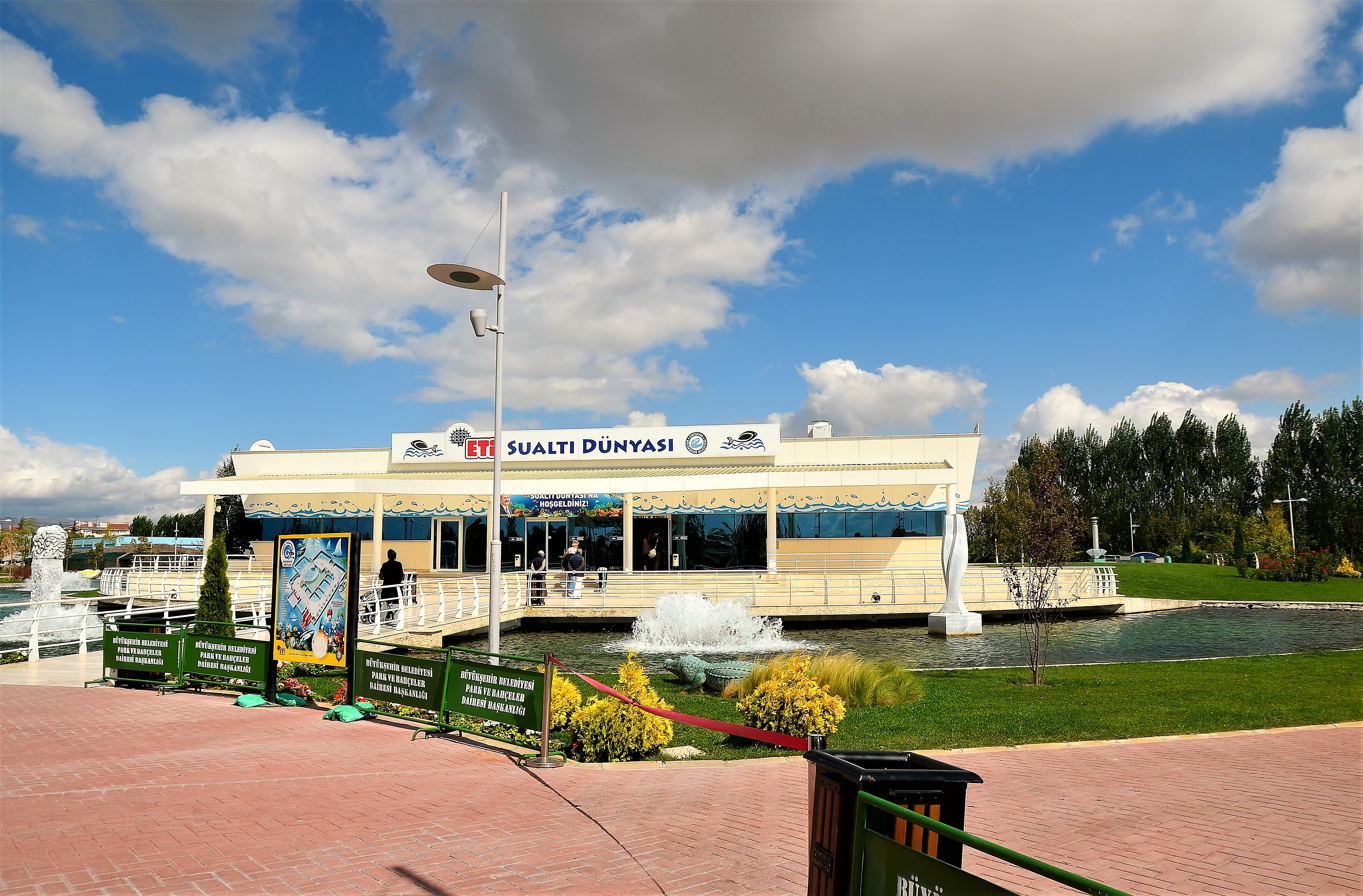
ETI Undersea World inside the Eskişehir Zoo.

The zoo is in the Sazova Park, the main science, culture and art park of Eskişehir at 39°46′05″N 30°28′35″E. It is in Tepebaşı ilçe (district). It was opened in April 2017 by the Metropolitan municipality of Eskişehir after two-year construction. It is sponsored by the Eskişehir-based Eti company. The zoo covers and area of 58 decares (0.058 km^{2}; 0.022 sq mi). There are two closed areas, one reserved for the aquarium, so called Undersea world (Turkish: Sualtı Dünyası)and the other is a house of birds, reptiles, amphibians and arthropoda from the warm regions. Most of the land animals have their yards protected either by fences with low voltage electricity or glass panels. In total there are 243 species 123 of which are in aquarium. The zoo is open to the public everyday except Mondays.

== Gallery ==
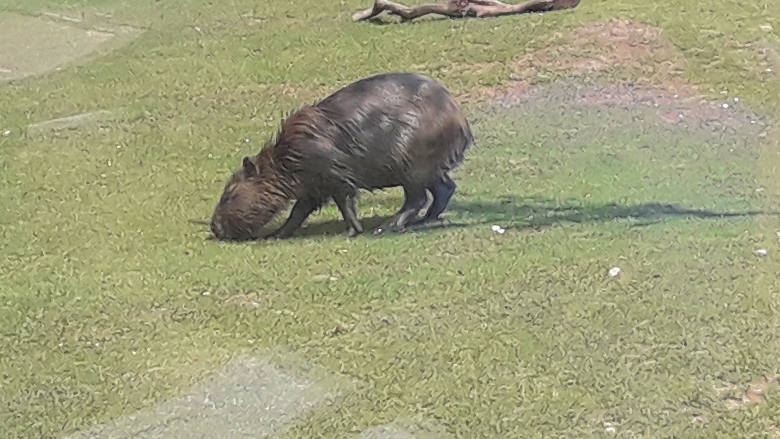
Capybara

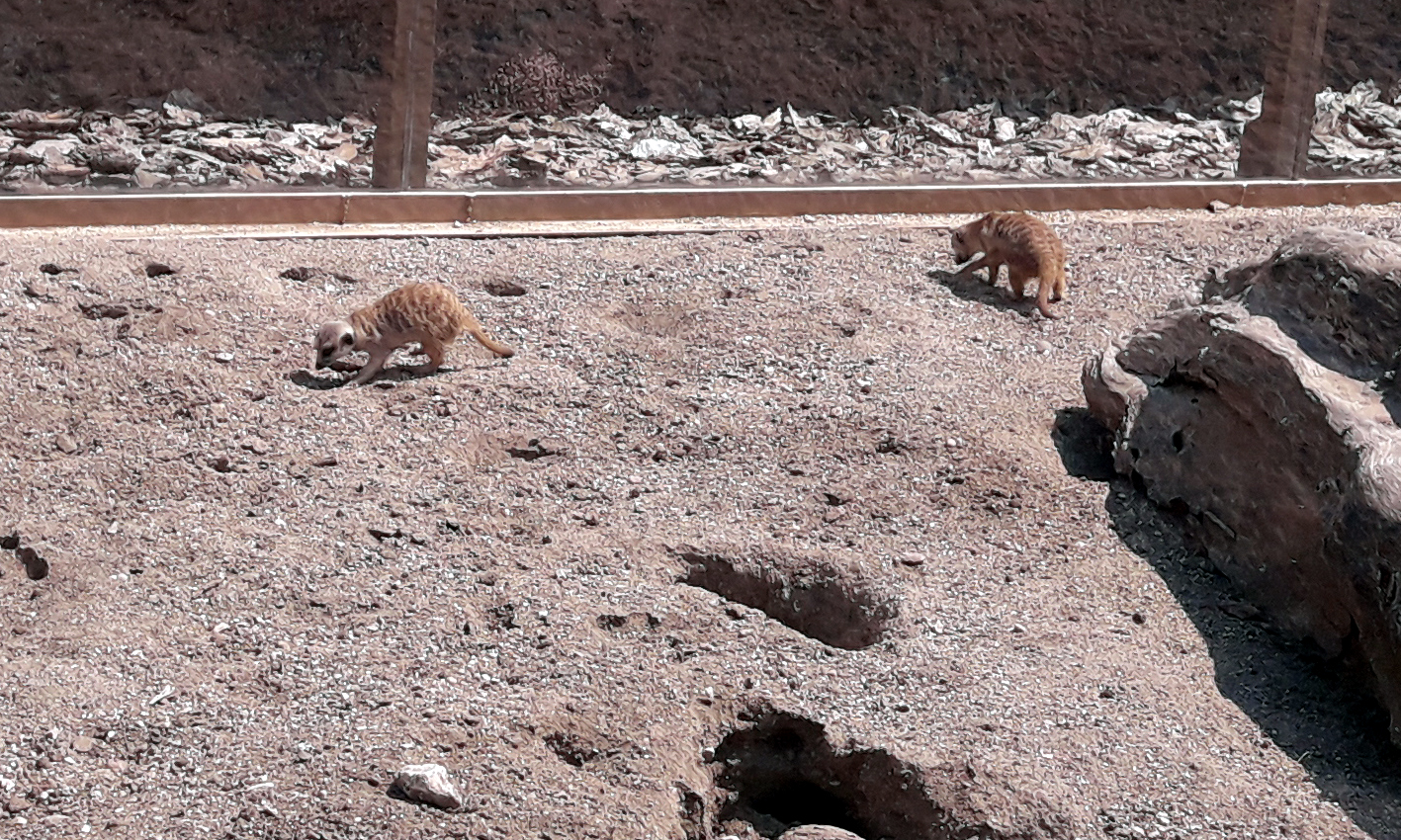
Meerkats

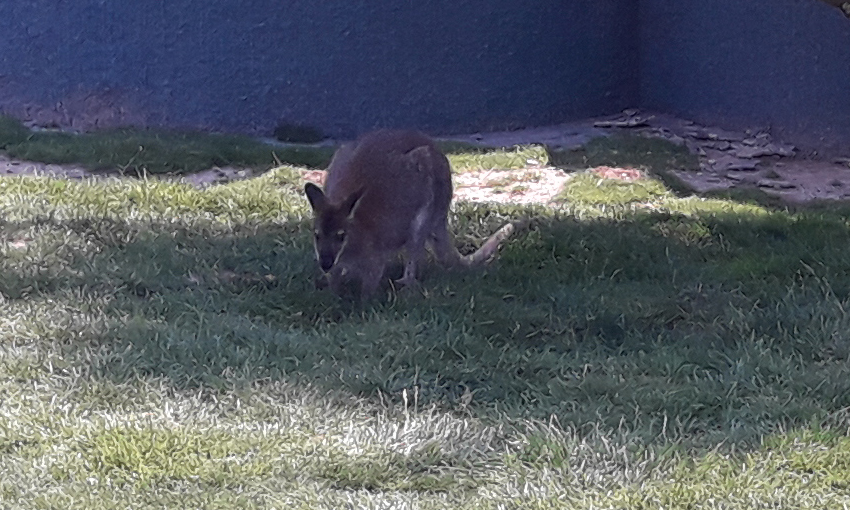
Wallaby

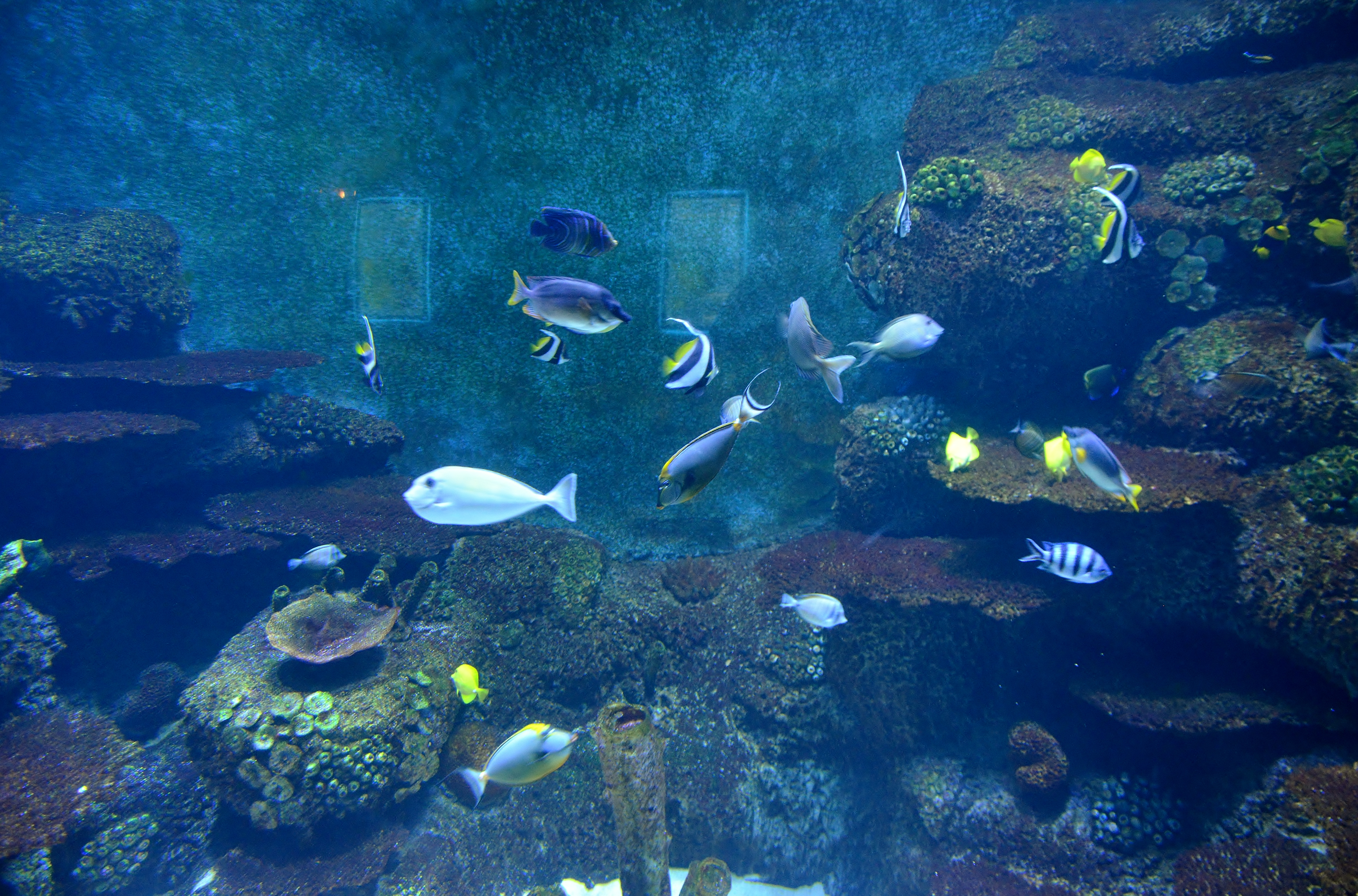
Diverse fish species

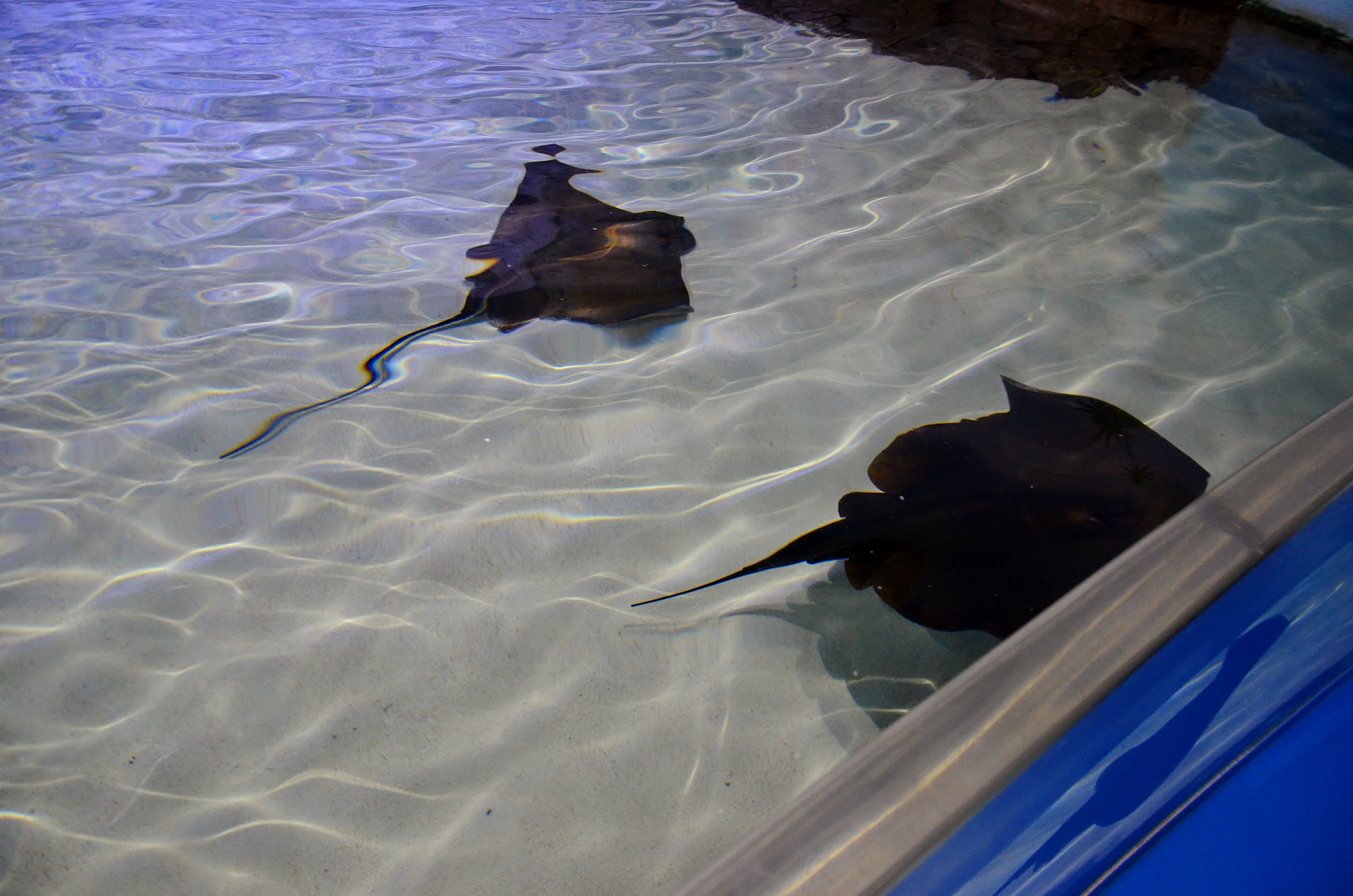
Stingrays
