= Engin Yılmaz =

Turkish politician (born 1977)

President of the Conservative Ascension Party
- Incumbent
- Assumed office 24 January 2013
- Leader: Ahmet Reyiz Yılmaz
- Preceded by: Position established

General Secretary of the Nationalist and Conservative Party
- In office 3 March 2010 – 24 January 2013
- Leader: Ahmet Reyiz Yılmaz
- Preceded by: Position established
- Succeeded by: Position abolished

Personal details
- Born: 1977 (age 48–49) Kumru, Ordu Province, Turkey
- Party: Nationalist and Conservative Party (2010-2013); Conservative Ascension Party (2013-present)
- Education: Anadolu University

Engin Yılmaz (born 1977) is a Turkish politician who currently serves as the President of the Conservative Ascension Party (MYP) of Turkey.

Born and educated in Kumru, Ordu Province, he studied economics at Anadolu University and graduated in 2003. He later worked at Turkcell and went on to work for an international company in 2009.

As a founding member of the Nationalist and Conservative Party (MMP) in March 2010, he served as the party's general secretary until it was dissolved in 2013. He stood as an Ordu MMP candidate in the 2011 general election, but was unsuccessful. Following the formation of the MYP, he became the party's president. He is married with one child and can speak English at a semi-fluent level.
