= Alexander Hauser =

Austrian footballer and coach

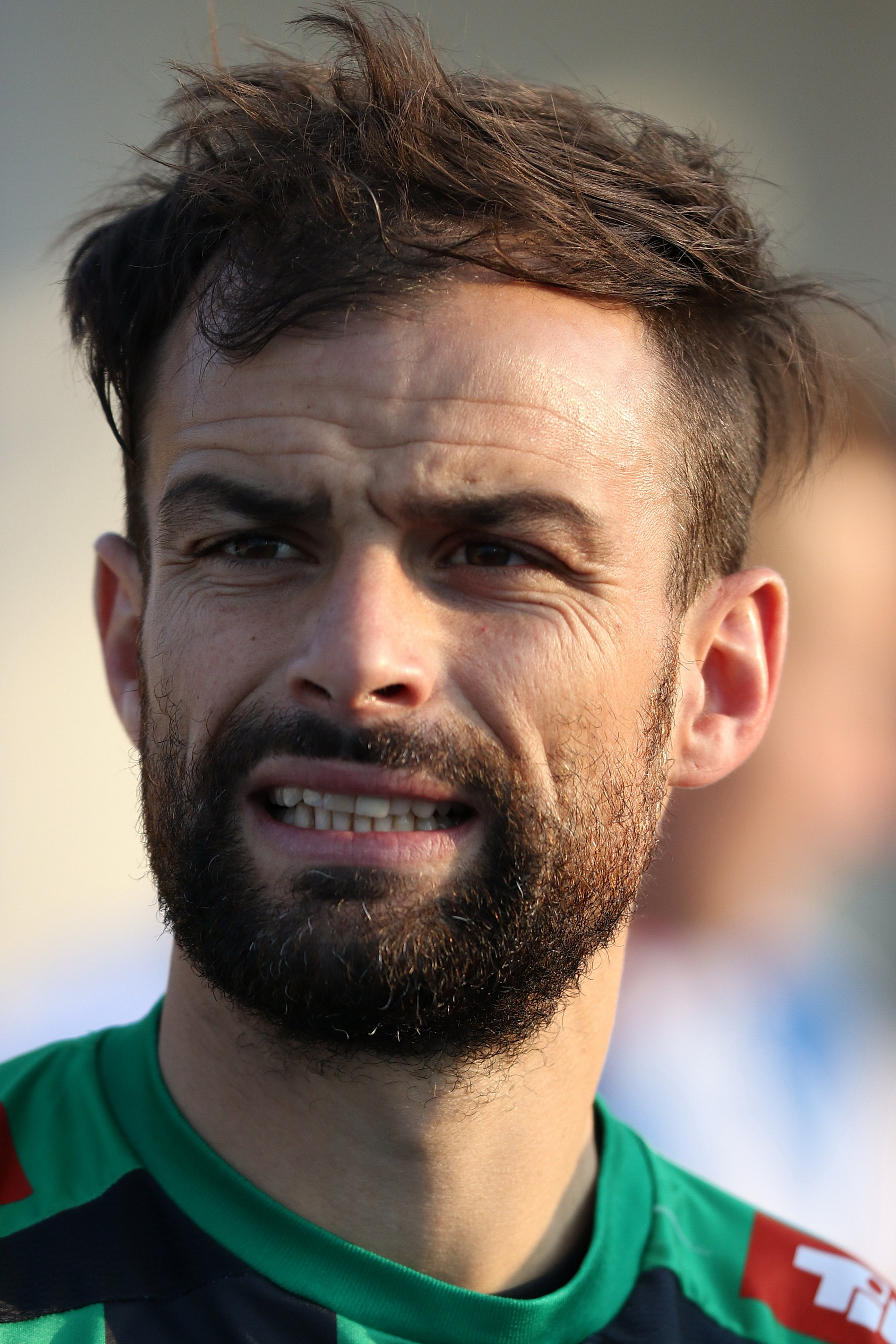
- Hauser with Wacker Innsbruck in 2016

Personal information
- Full name: Alexander Hauser
- Date of birth: 23 June 1984 (age 42)
- Place of birth: St. Johann in Tirol, Austria
- Height: 1.79 m (5 ft 10 in)
- Position: Midfielder

Team information
- Current team: Newcastle United (assistant)

Youth career
- SK St. Johann
- Tirol Innsbruck
- Rangers

Senior career*
Years	Team	Apps	(Gls)
2002–2005	SW Bregenz	53	(5)
2005–2007	Pasching	5	(0)
2005–2006	→ SC Schwanenstadt (loan)	7	(0)
2007	→ TSV Hartberg (loan)	12	(1)
2007–2008	SK Austria Kärnten	15	(2)
2008–2009	Wiener Neustadt	18	(1)
2009–2017	Wacker Innsbruck	222	(12)
2017–2018	SK St. Johann	5	(0)

Managerial career
- 2017–2018: SK St. Johann (assistant)
- 2021: FC Liefering (assistant)
- 2021–2024: Red Bull Salzburg (assistant)
- 2023: Red Bull Salzburg (interim)
- 2024–2026: Al-Ahli (assistant)
- 2026–: Newcastle United (assistant)
- * Club domestic league appearances and goals

Alexander Hauser (born 23 June 1984) is an Austrian football coach and former professional footballer who is an assistant coach at Premier League club Newcastle United.

As a player, he spent eight seasons with Wacker Innsbruck, where he was club captain and made 237 appearances in all competitions.

== Playing career ==
Hauser began his career in his native Tyrol and spent part of his youth career with Rangers in Scotland. He returned to Austria to begin his senior career with SW Bregenz, where he played in the Austrian Bundesliga.

He subsequently played for Pasching, Schwanenstadt, Hartberg, Austria Kärnten and Wiener Neustadt before joining Wacker Innsbruck in August 2009.

Hauser remained at Wacker Innsbruck for eight seasons and served as the club's captain. He left in May 2017 after his contract was terminated by mutual agreement. Wacker stated that he had made 237 appearances and scored 14 goals for the club in all competitions.

== Coaching career ==
=== Early career ===
Hauser began coaching while still playing professionally for Wacker Innsbruck. In August 2011, he became an assistant coach of the club's under-15 team, combining the role with his first-team playing career. He continued working in Wacker's youth setup until 2016.

After leaving Wacker as a player in 2017, Hauser returned to his hometown club SK St. Johann, where he spent the 2017–18 season as an assistant coach. He later coached the club's under-18 team during the 2019–20 season.

=== FC Liefering ===
For the 2020–21 season, Hauser joined the youth setup at Red Bull Salzburg as an assistant coach of the under-19 team. He remained in the role until January 2021, when he moved to FC Liefering as an assistant to Matthias Jaissle.

=== Red Bull Salzburg ===
In May 2021, Hauser and Florens Koch were appointed assistant coaches at Red Bull Salzburg, where Jaissle was due to take over as head coach for the 2021–22 season. Both had previously worked under Jaissle at Liefering.

Hauser remained part of Jaissle's staff for the following two seasons. In July 2023, Salzburg released Jaissle from his duties while he was in talks over a move to Al-Ahli. The club announced that Hauser and Koch would take charge of the team for its opening Bundesliga match against Altach.

Hauser and Koch subsequently remained assistant coaches following the appointment of Gerhard Struber. In October 2023, they jointly took charge of a league match against Austria Klagenfurt when Struber was absent through illness.

At the end of the 2023–24 season, Salzburg reorganised its coaching staff following the appointment of Pep Lijnders as head coach. Hauser and Koch were replaced as first-team assistant coaches by Onur Cinel and Vítor Matos.

=== Al-Ahli ===
In June 2024, Hauser agreed to join Saudi Pro League club Al-Ahli as an assistant coach, reuniting with Matthias Jaissle. Hauser had previously worked under Jaissle at Liefering and Red Bull Salzburg.

In his first season at Al-Ahli, the club won the 2024–25 AFC Champions League Elite, defeating Kawasaki Frontale 2–0 in the final in Jeddah. It was Al-Ahli's first Asian club championship, and Hauser became the first Austrian to win the competition.

Al-Ahli subsequently won the 2025 Saudi Super Cup. Hauser described his move to Saudi Arabia as the right decision and discussed his role as Jaissle's assistant in an interview with Kurier in September 2025.

In April 2026, Al-Ahli retained the AFC Champions League Elite, defeating Machida Zelvia 1–0 after extra time in the final. The victory gave Hauser his second consecutive Asian title as an assistant coach.

=== Newcastle United ===
In August 2026, Hauser left Al-Ahli following Jaissle's appointment as head coach of Premier League club Newcastle United, joining his backroom staff as an assistant coach.

The move continued Hauser's working relationship with Jaissle, having previously served as his assistant at Liefering, Red Bull Salzburg and Al-Ahli.

== Honours ==
Player

Wiener Neustadt

- Austrian First League: 2008–09

Wacker Innsbruck

- Austrian First League: 2009–10

Assistant coach

Red Bull Salzburg

- Austrian Football Bundesliga: 2021–22, 2022–23
- Austrian Cup: 2021–22

Al-Ahli

- AFC Champions League Elite: 2024–25, 2025–26
- Saudi Super Cup: 2025
