= Anadolu University =

Public university in Eskişehir, Turkey

Coordinates: 39.7914°N 30.4997°E

- Anadolu Üniversitesi (Turkish)
- Motto: Turkish: "Yaşamboyu Öğrenme"
- Motto in English: Lifelong Learning
- Type: Public
- Established: 1958; 68 years ago
- Accreditation: CoHE, Bologna Process
- Affiliations: European University Association; Caucasus University Association; Erasmus Programme; European Association of Distance Teaching Universities
- Rector: Yusuf Adıgüzel
- Academic staff: 1,729
- Administrative staff: 1,776
- Undergraduates: 18,551 (On-campus)
- Postgraduates: 4,812
- Other students: 989,318 (Distance Learning)
- Location: Tepebaşı, Eskişehir
- Campus: Urban
- Colours: Burgundy; Blue
- Website: anadolu.edu.tr

University rankings

Regional – Overall
- QS Emerging Europe and Central Asia: 184 (2022)

Anadolu University (Turkish: Anadolu Üniversitesi) is a public university in Eskişehir, Turkey. Anadolu University serves as the primary national provider of distance education. The university offers a range of educational programs, both on-campus and through distance education.

== History ==
Anadolu University originated from the Eskişehir Academy of Economics and Commercial Sciences, established in 1958. It was officially formed in 1982 through the amalgamation of four higher education institutions: the Academy of Economics and Commercial Sciences, the State Academy of Architecture and Engineering, the Institute of Education, and a medical school. As the Academy of Economics and Commercial Sciences was the earliest of these institutions, Anadolu University has adopted 1958 as its date of establishment. Eskişehir Osmangazi University and Eskişehir Technical University was founded with the transfer of various educational units of Anadolu University.

== Campus ==
Faculties and schools of Anadolu University, including the Distance Education Faculty, are situated at the Yunus Emre Campus, centrally located within the city. This campus hosts student housing, the university hospital, Atatürk Culture and Arts Center, Cinema Anadolu, Museum of Contemporary Arts and the majority of administrative buildings. The Republic History Museum, the Educational Cartoons Museum and the Yunus Emre Calligraphy Museums are located in the Historical Odunpazarı district and the Turkish World Application and Research Center in Sazova Park.

To support its distance education programs, Anadolu University maintains 88 administrative centers across urban areas in Turkey. These centers provide academic counseling and offer optional evening classes for distance learners.

== Distance education ==
The Higher Education Act of 1981 designated Anadolu University as the national provider of distance education, a role it has emphasized since its inception in 1982. The university aims to provide educational opportunities to individuals in rural areas of Turkey and to those who cannot attend traditional educational institutions due to time or resource constraints. This initiative has proven successful, with enrollment in open education programs growing from fewer than 30,000 in the 1982-83 academic year to over 870,000 by 2005-06. The programs are now also accessible to Turkish communities in Northern Cyprus and the European Union.

Anadolu University offers a range of distance education programs, including 4-year Bachelor of Arts degrees in Economics and Business Administration, as well as nineteen 2-year associate degrees across various disciplines. Additionally, the Turkish Ministry of National Education has tasked Anadolu University with training the nation's preschool and English language teachers through distance learning platforms, although the latter requires students to complete two years of in-person classes.

From 2005 to 2010, Anadolu University collaborated with SUNY Empire State College to offer an eMBA degree via distance education. Anadolu University is a member of the European Association of Distance Teaching Universities and holds accreditation alongside other institutions including the Open University, KU Leuven, and Aarhus.

== International perspective ==
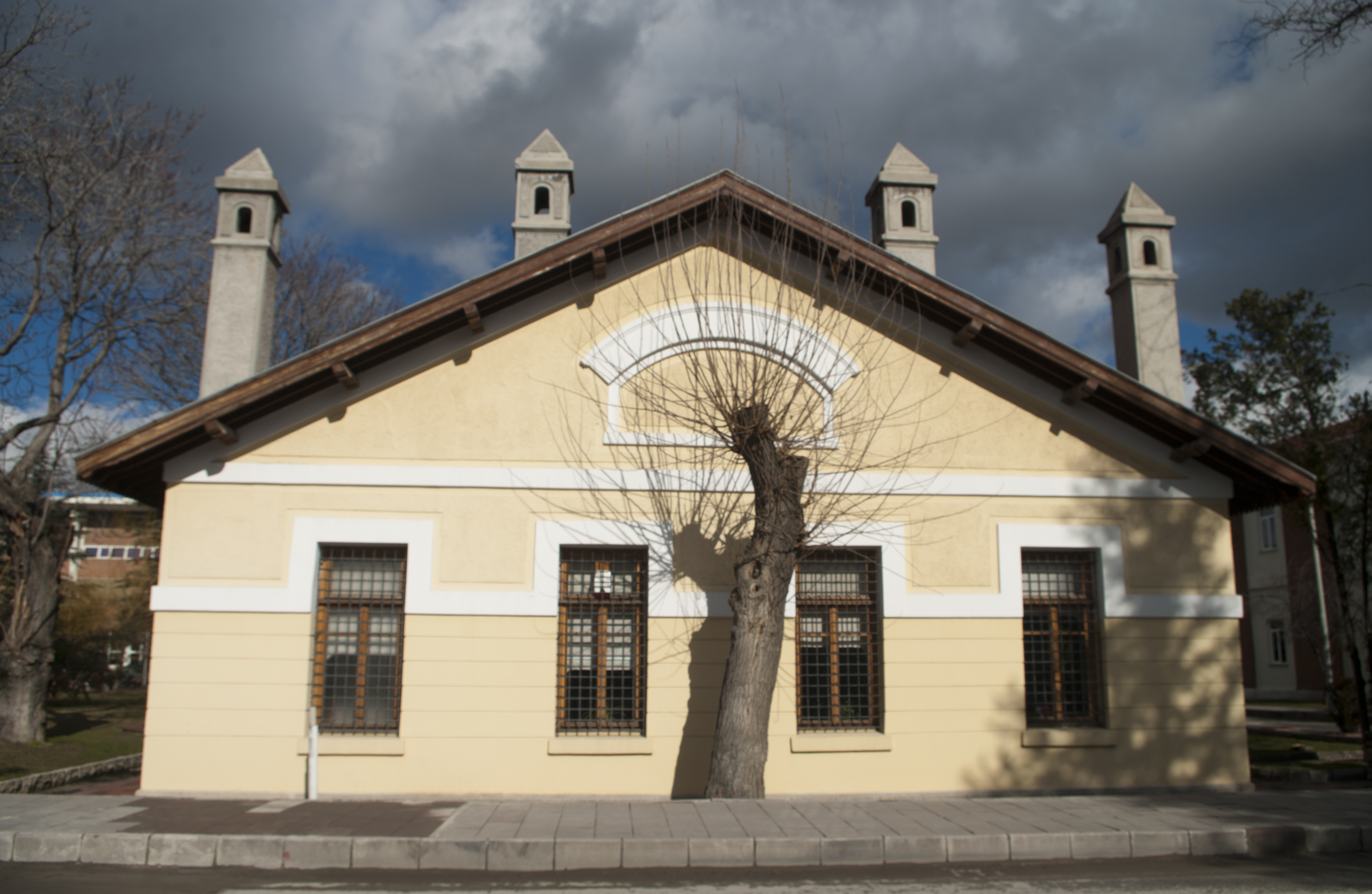
Museum for Modern Arts at Yunus Emre Campus of Anadolu University

Anadolu University has established significant international collaborations with several globally recognized institutions. In the United States, Anadolu University collaborates with the University of Oregon, University of North Texas, New Mexico Institute of Mining and Technology, Stephen F. Austin State University, Empire State University and the State University of New York at Cortland.

In Germany, Anadolu University's partnerships include the University of Hagen, Ruhr University Bochum, Hochschule Düsseldorf, FOM University of Applied Sciences, Goethe University Frankfurt, University of Hagen and Universität Hildesheim, University of Kassel, University of Mainz, University of Marburg, LMU Munich, Paderborn University, University of Potsdam, University of Regensburg and Saarlande University.

In France, the university's partnerships are focused on specialized institutions that enhance both cultural and academic exchange. These include the Institut National des Langues et Civilisations Orientales, University of Reims Champagne-Ardenne, University of Rouen Normandy, University of Lille, and Paris Descartes University.

== Organisation ==
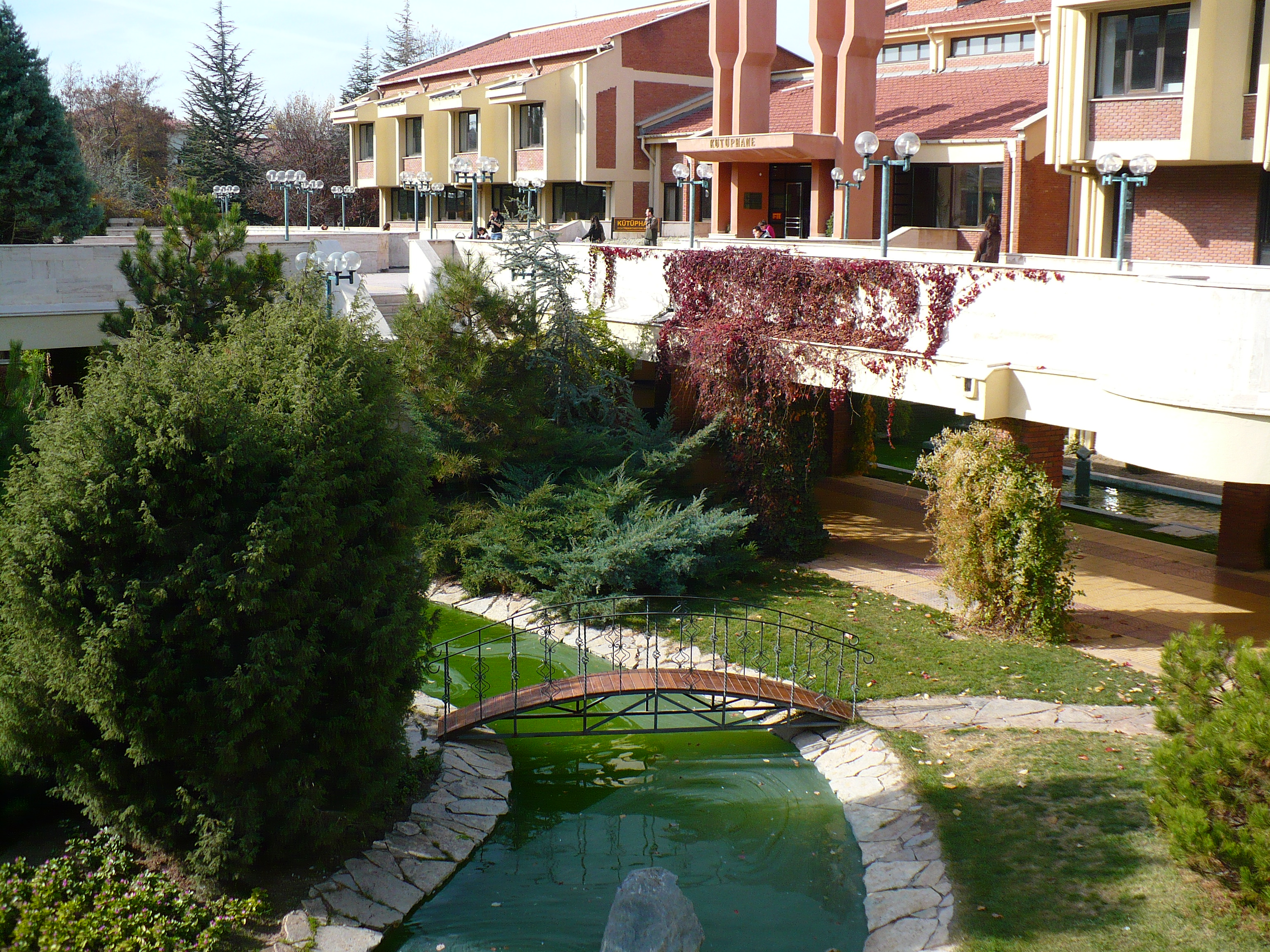
Anadolu University Main Library

=== Faculties ===
- Distance Education Faculty (Global Campus)
- Faculty of Pharmacy
- Faculty of Humanities
- Faculty of Education
- Faculty of Fine Arts
- Faculty of Law
- Faculty of Economics and Administrative Sciences
- Faculty of Communication Sciences
- Faculty of Health Sciences
- Faculty of Tourism
- Faculty of Computer and Information Sciences
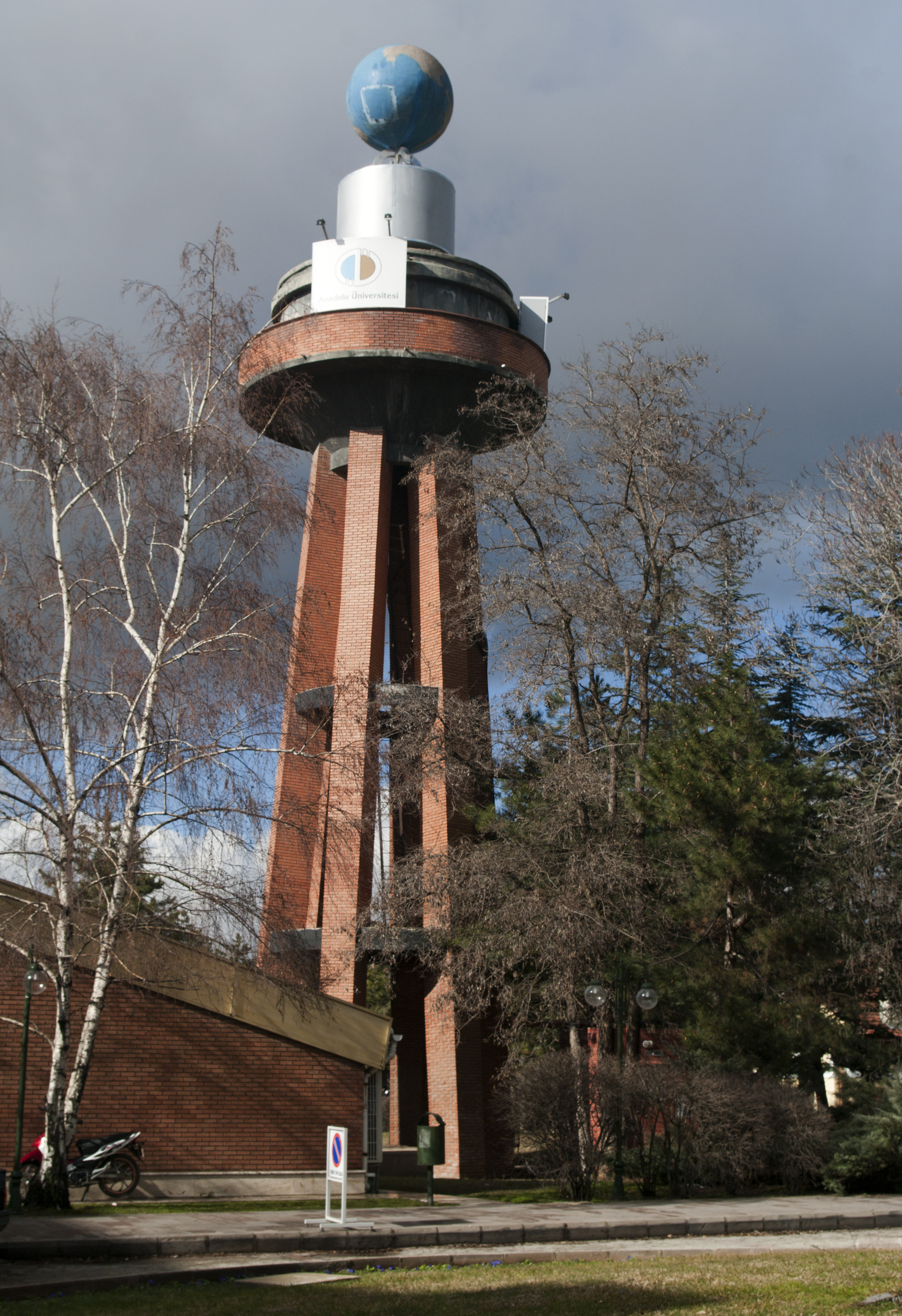
  A water deposit tower at Yunus Emre Campus of Anadolu University

=== Graduate Schools and Institutes ===
- Graduate School
- Research Institute for Individuals with Disabilities

=== Schools ===
- School for the Disabled Individuals
- School of Foreign Languages
- State Conservatory

=== Vocational schools ===
- Eskişehir Vocational School
- Vocational School of Justice
- Vocational School of Information Technologies
- Yunus Emre Vocational School of Health Services

== Notable people ==
- Yılmaz Büyükerşen — Former mayor of Eskişehir, former rector of Anadolu University
- Fethi Heper — Football player
- Pelin Karahan — Actress
- Ayşe Hatun Önal — Model, actress, singer-Songwriter
- Beyazıt Öztürk — TV personality, comedian and actor
- Levent Üzümcü — Actor
- Nurgül Yeşilçay — Actress
- Sara Kaya — Politician, former mayor of Nusaybin
- Sakıp Sabancı — Turkish businessman (Honoris causa, 1984)
- Turgut Özakman — Turkish author (Honoris causa,1998)
- Ali Erdemir — Turkish-American materials scientist (Honoris causa,1998)
- Ali İsmail Korkmaz — Student
- Müge Boz — Actress
