= Kenan Engin =

German-Turkish political scientist

Kenan Engin (b. 1974, Pertek, Tunceli Province, Turkey) is a German-Kurdish political scientist.

Engin writes articles in Turkish, German and English for magazines and newspapers since 1995. He immigrated to Germany from Turkey in 2000 and studied at the University of Heidelberg, working there from 2009 onward.

Engin identified the Arab Spring as the "fifth wave of democracy" because of evident features qualitatively similar to the third wave of democracy in Latin America during the 1970s and 1980s.
