= Sazova Park =

Public park in Eskişehir, Turkey

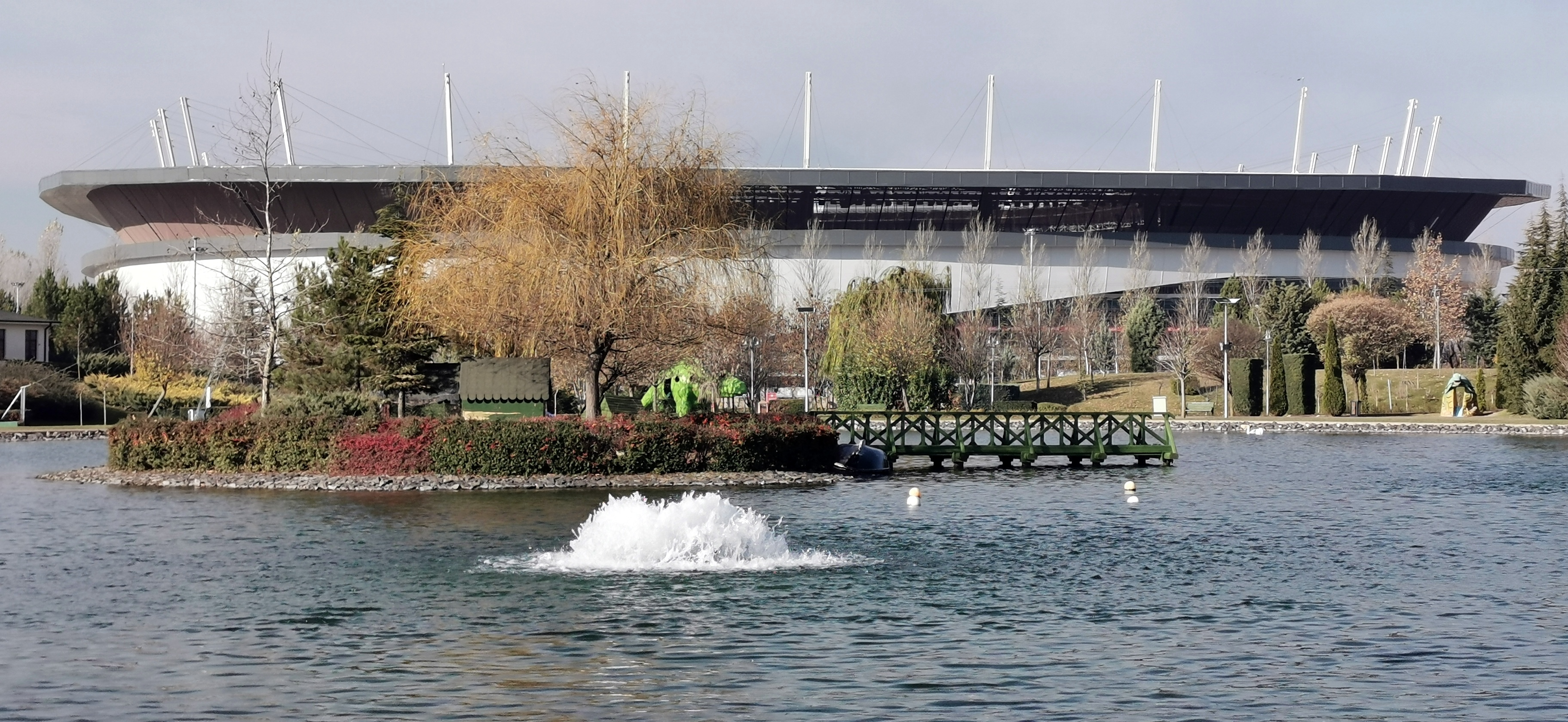
- Sazova Park, Eskişehir, Turkey.

- Location within Turkey
- Location: Eskişehir, Turkey
- Coordinates: 39.7654°N 30.4710°E
- Created: 2008; 18 years ago

Sazova Park, officially Sazova Science, Culture and Art Park (Turkish: Sazova Bilim Kültür ve Sanat Parkı), is a park in Eskişehir, Turkey. It was established by the metropolitan municipality of Eskişehir in 2008.

== Location ==
The park is in Tepebaşı secondary municipality, next to New Eskişehir Stadium at 39°46′N 30°28′E. It is quite close to midtown and there are regular bus services. Its total area is 400 decares (0.40 km^{2}; 0.15 sq mi)

== The park ==
The park consists of several parts. In addition to restaurants and cafehouses, these are;

1. Eskişehir Zoo (sponsored by Eti Company)
2. Planetarium (sponsored by Sabancı Holding)
3. Turkic science history building
4. Scientific experiments building
5. Esminiaturk (models of historical 1/25 size Turkic buildings, similar to Miniatürk in Istanbul)
6. Japanese garden
7. An artificial lake and a pirate ship
8. Dream Château
9. Miniature railway

== Gallery ==
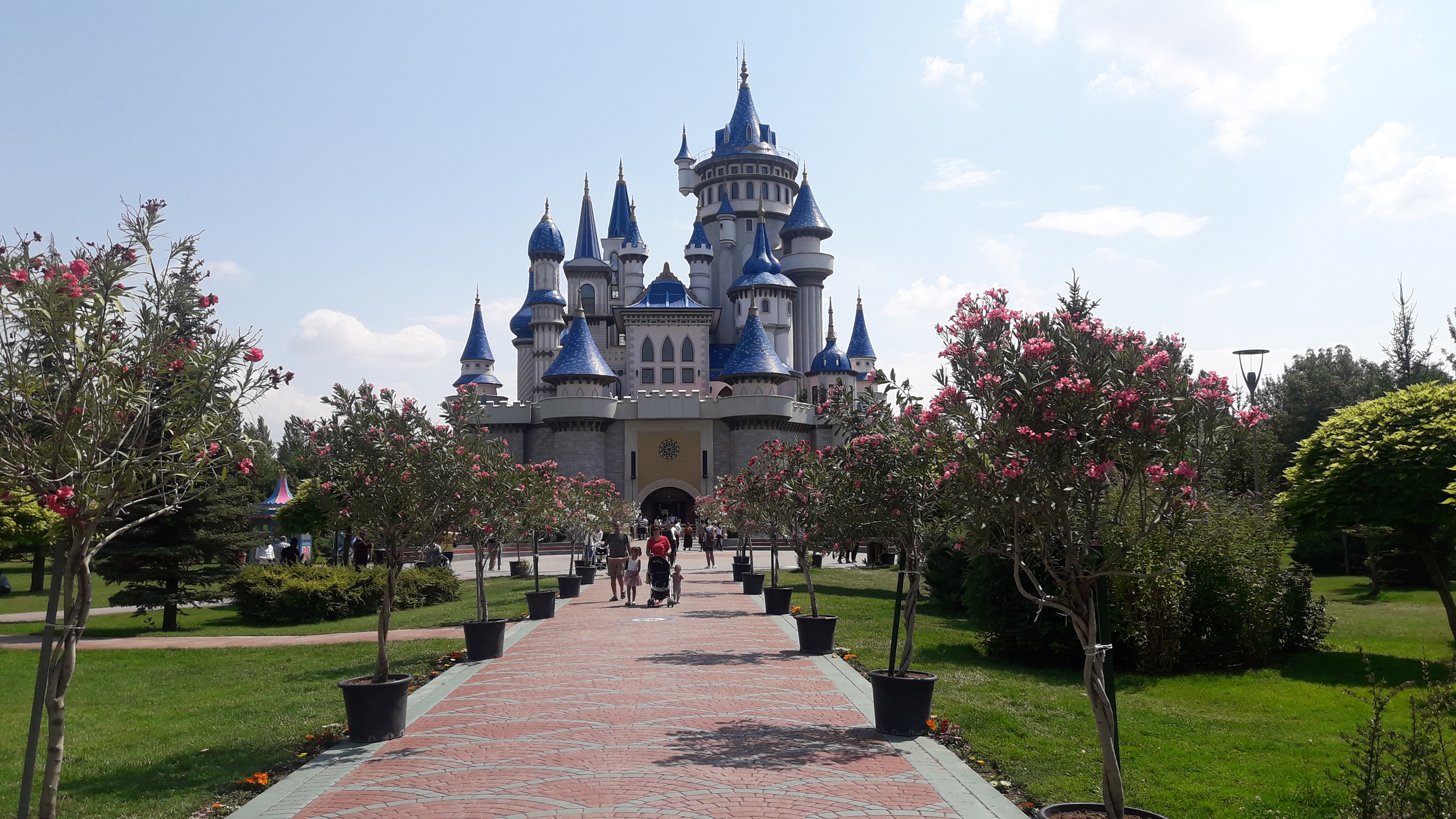
Dream Chateau

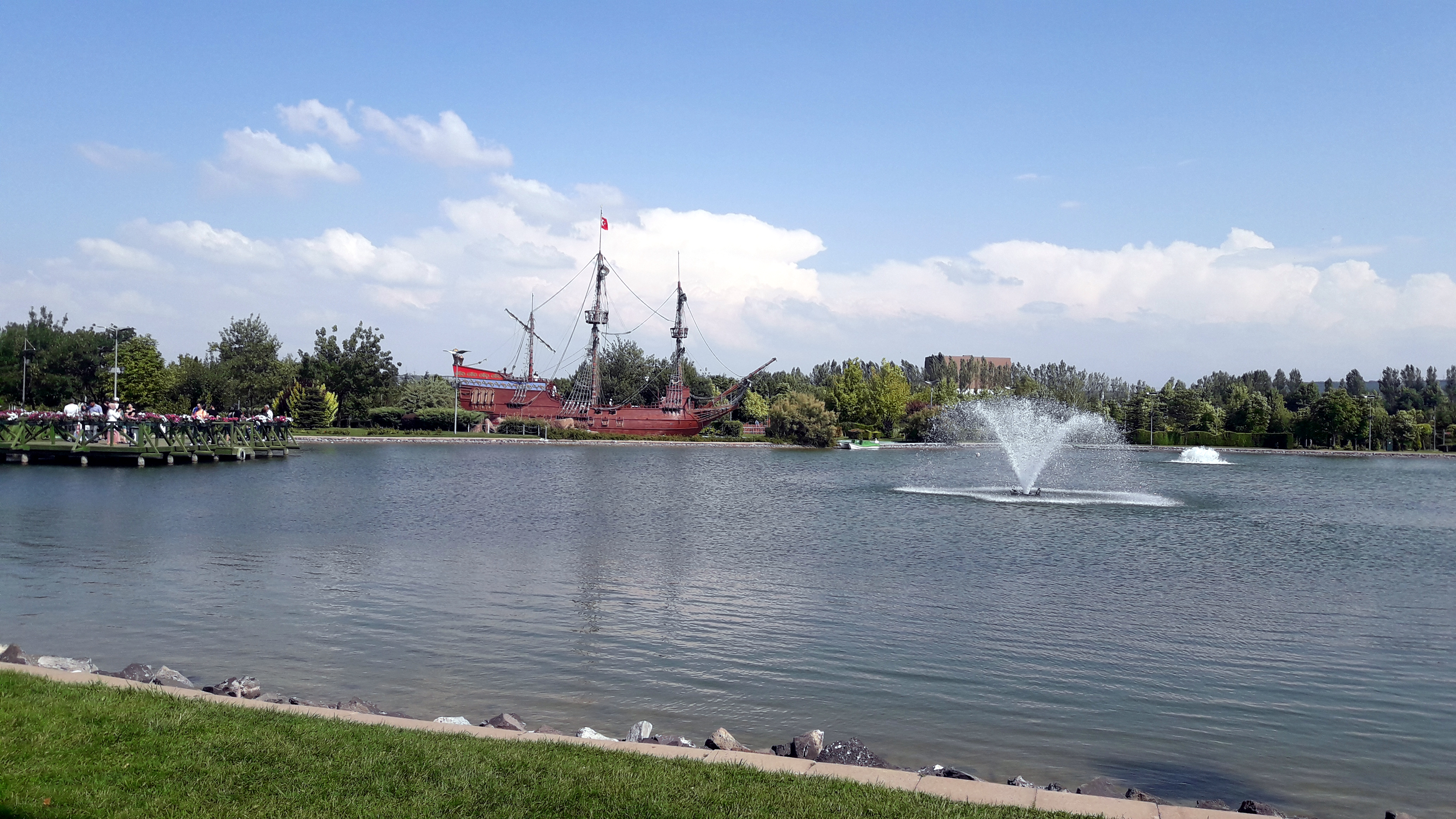
Pirates' ship by the pond

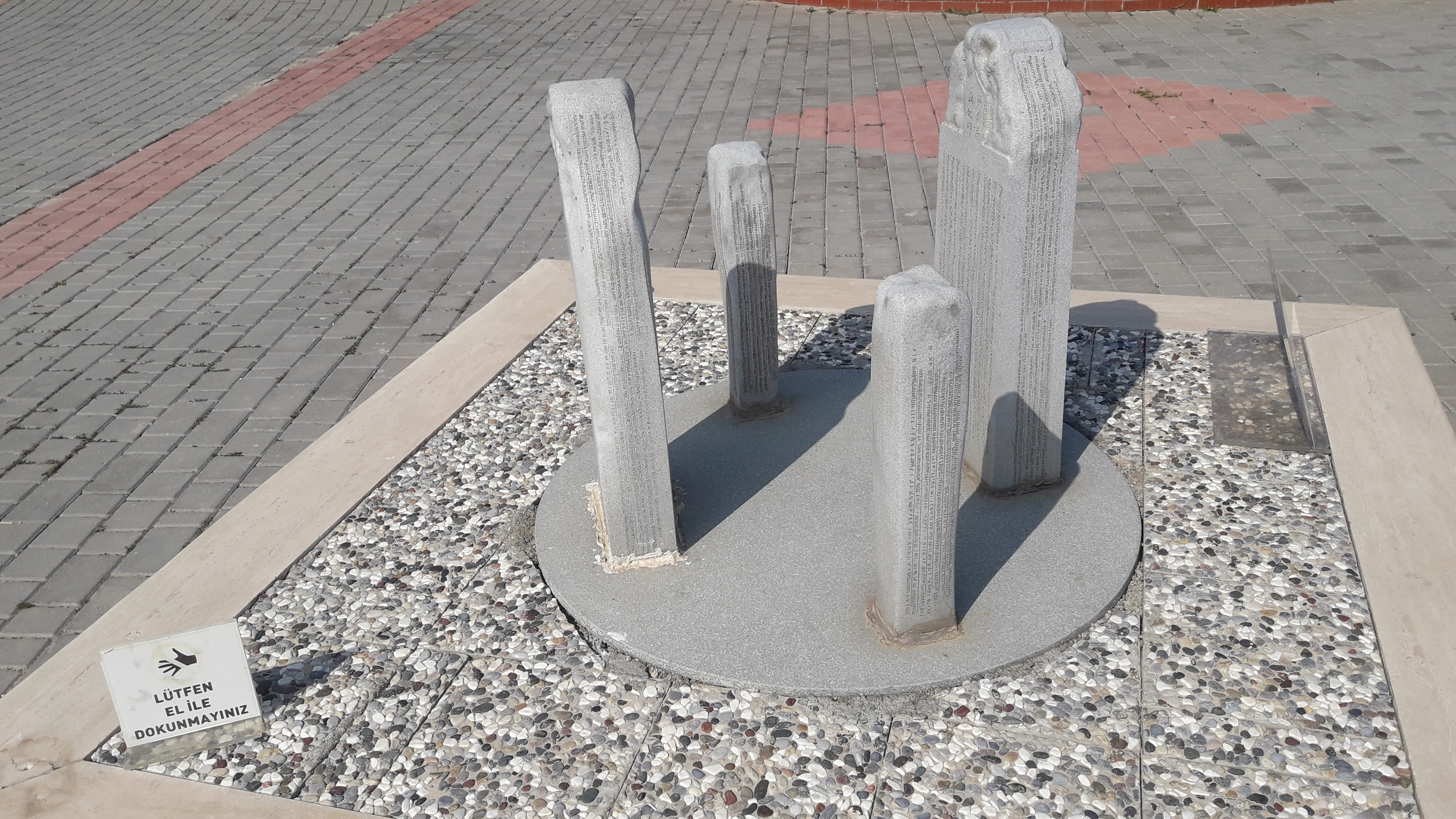
Esminiaturk:Orkhon Inscriptions

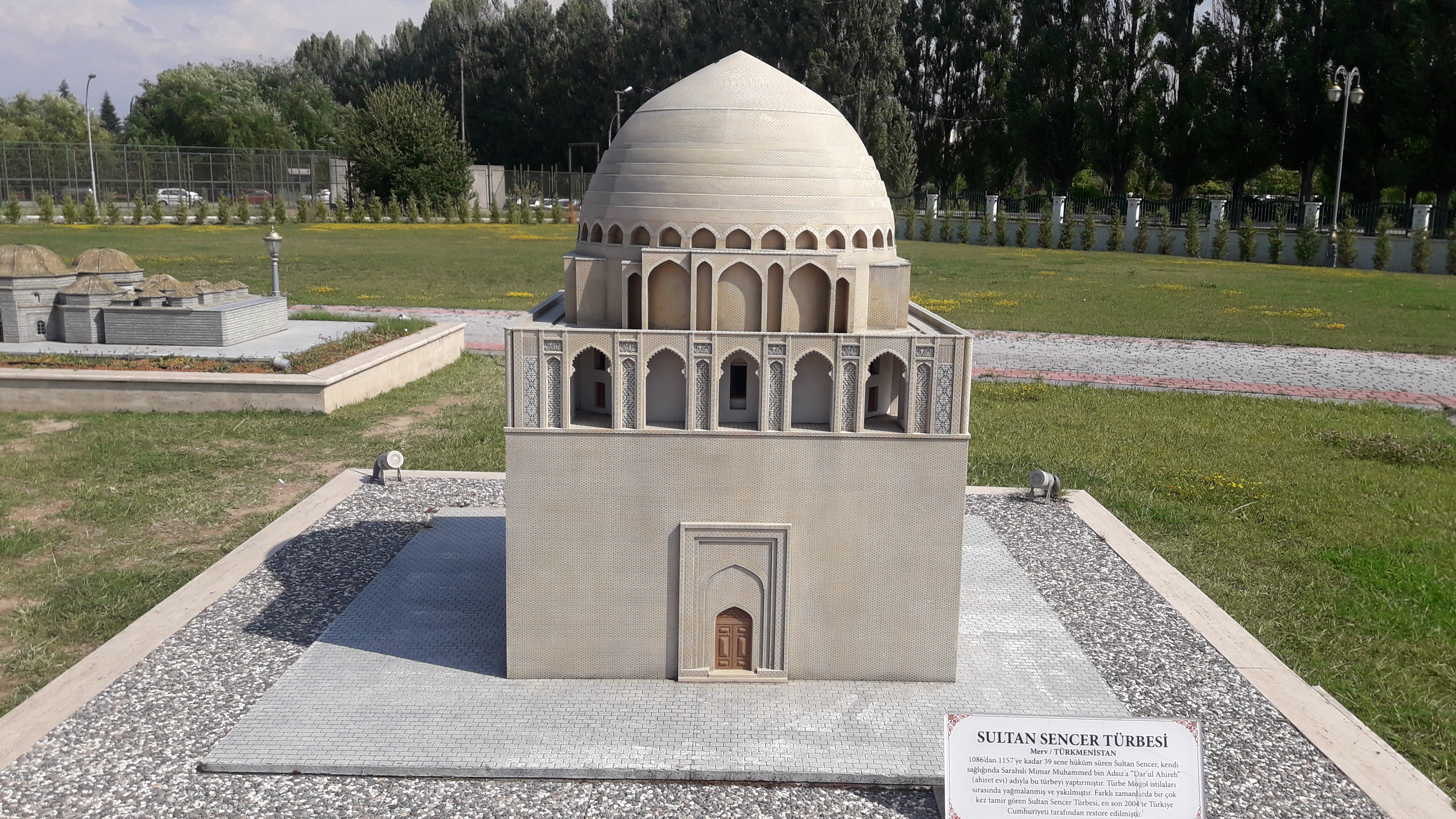
Esminiaturk:Seljukid Sultan Sencer's mausoleum (1/25 size)

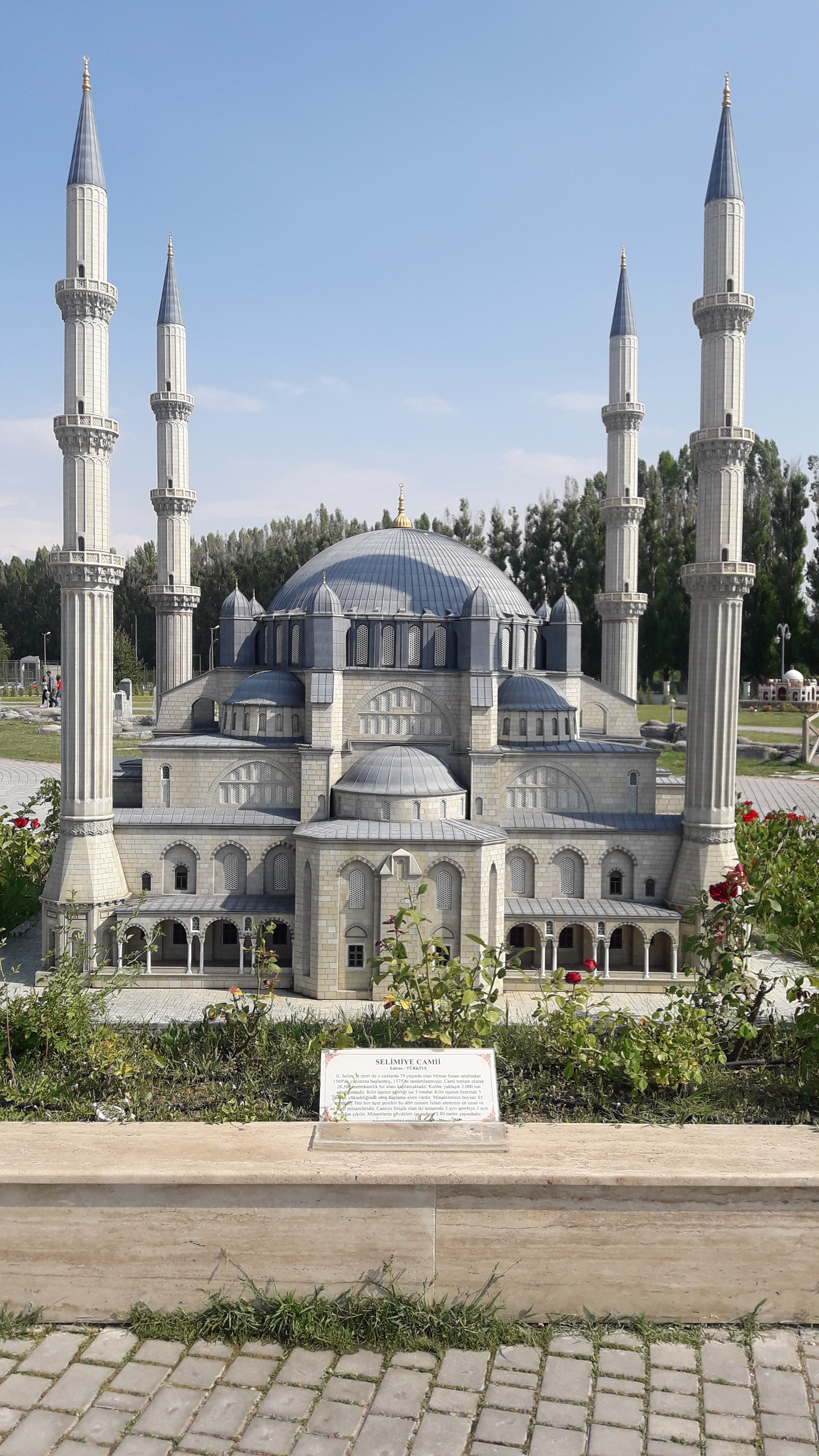
Esminiaturk:Sultan Ahmet Mosque (1/25 size)

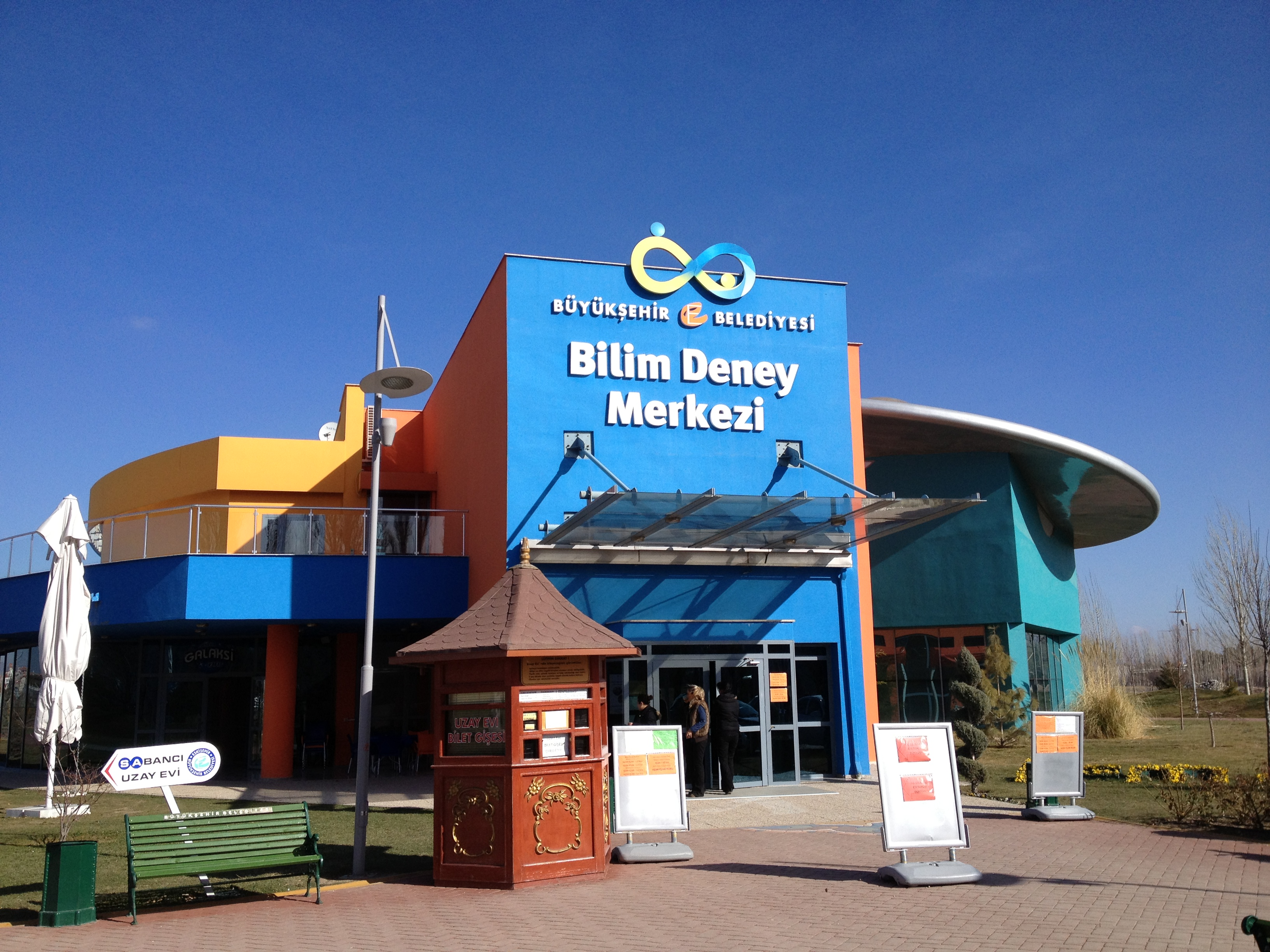
Scientific experiments building

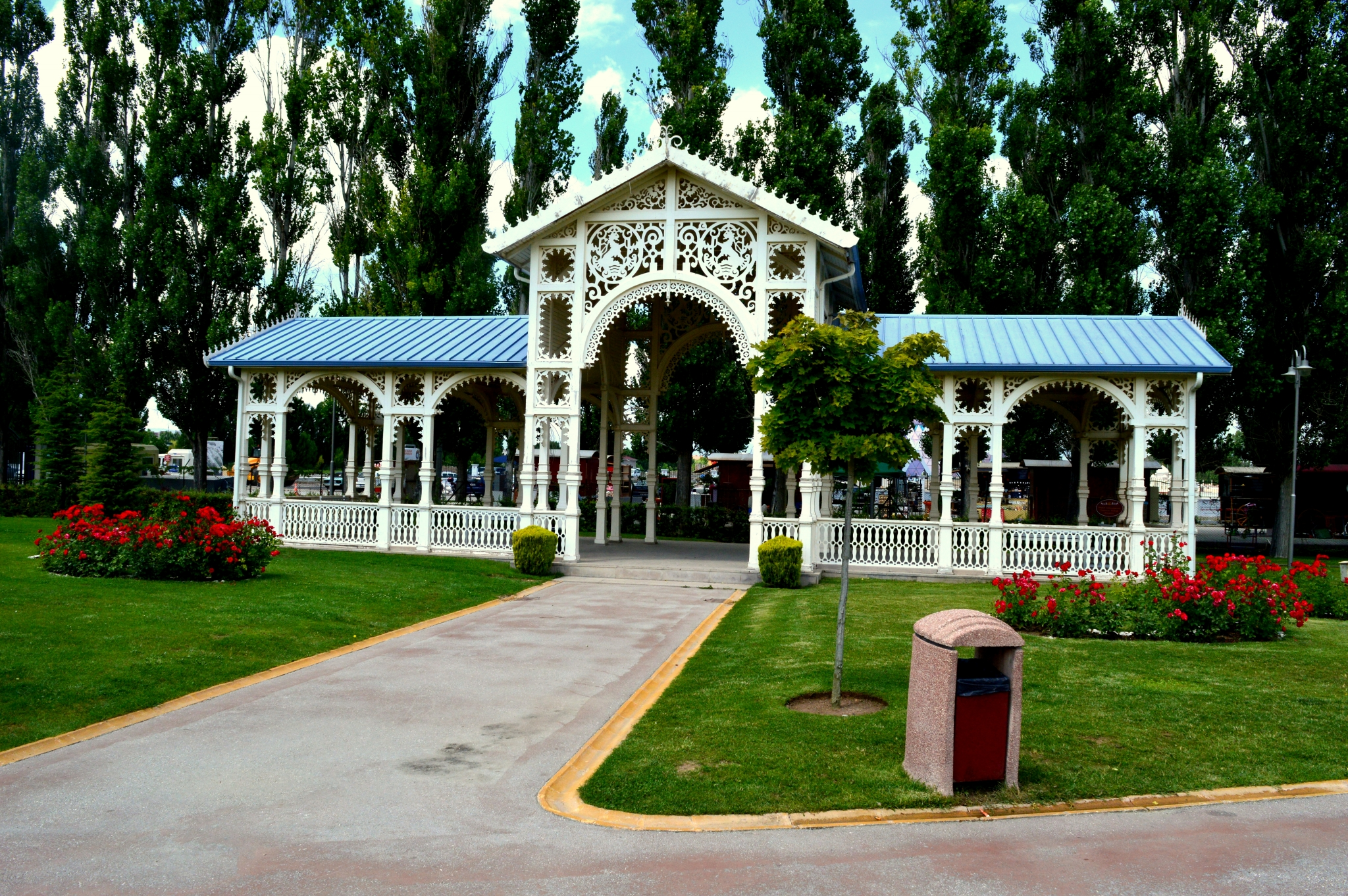
Miniature railway station

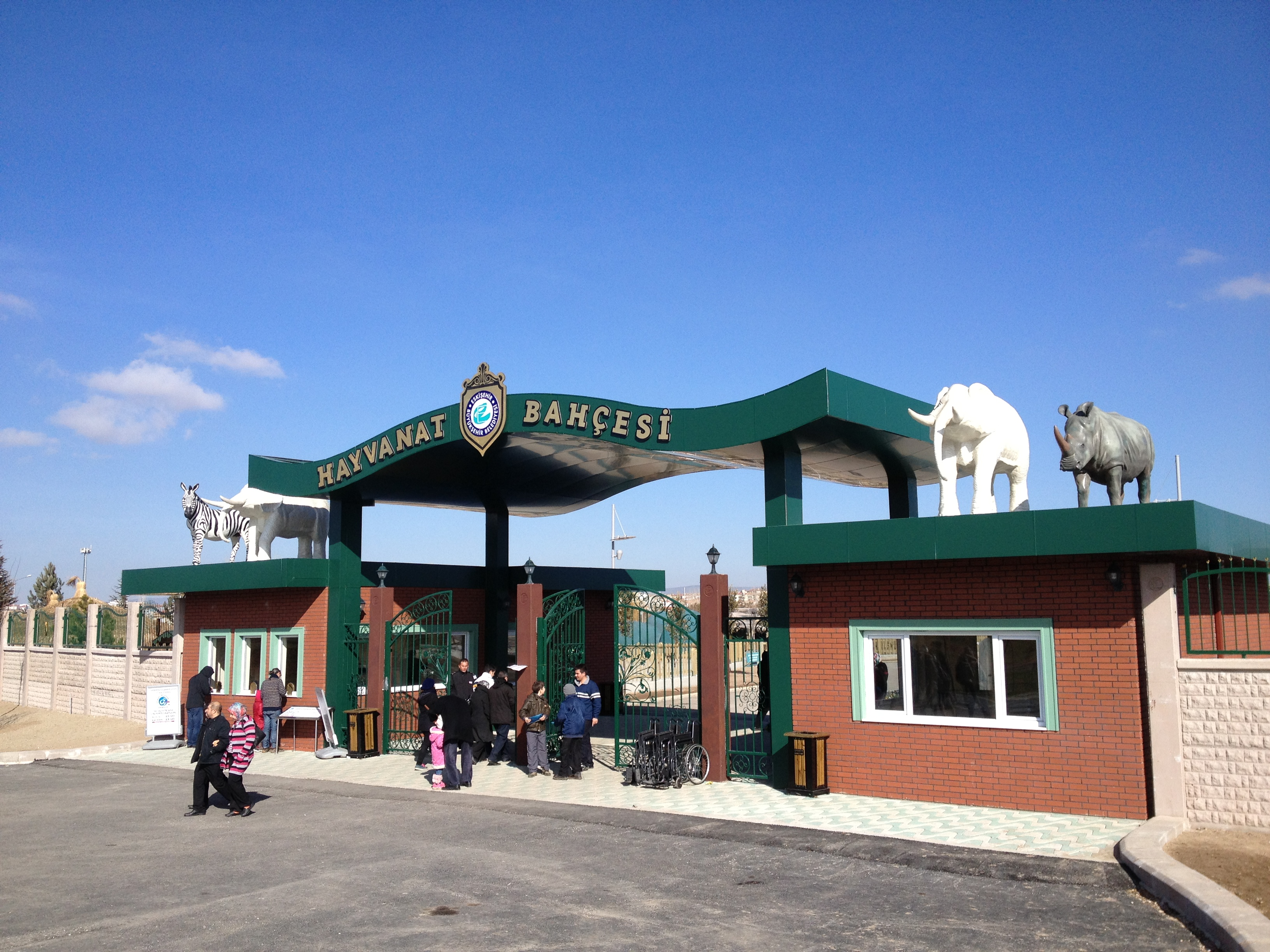
Zoo gate

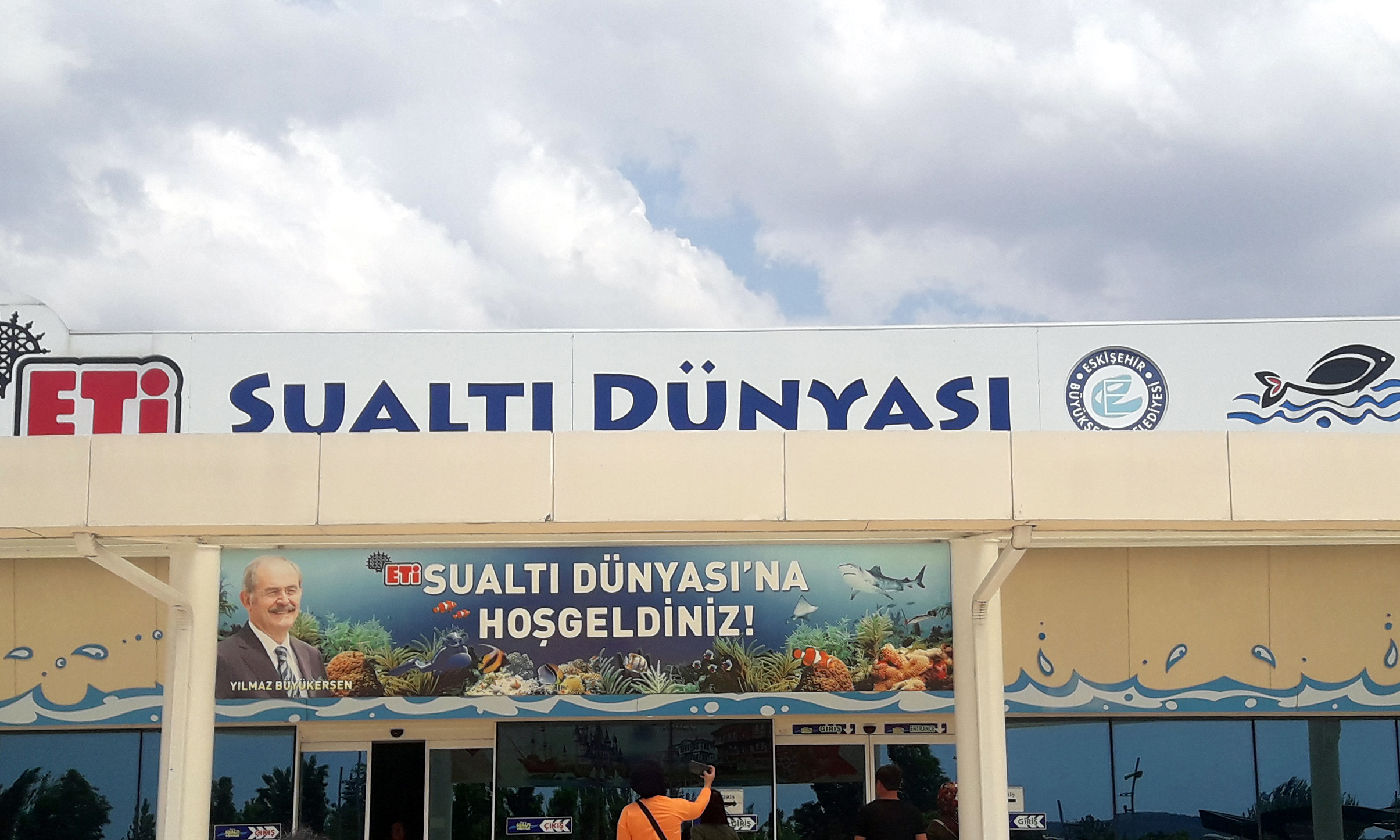
Aquarium gate
