= Engin Oeztuerk =

German-Turkish musician

Engin Seyrl
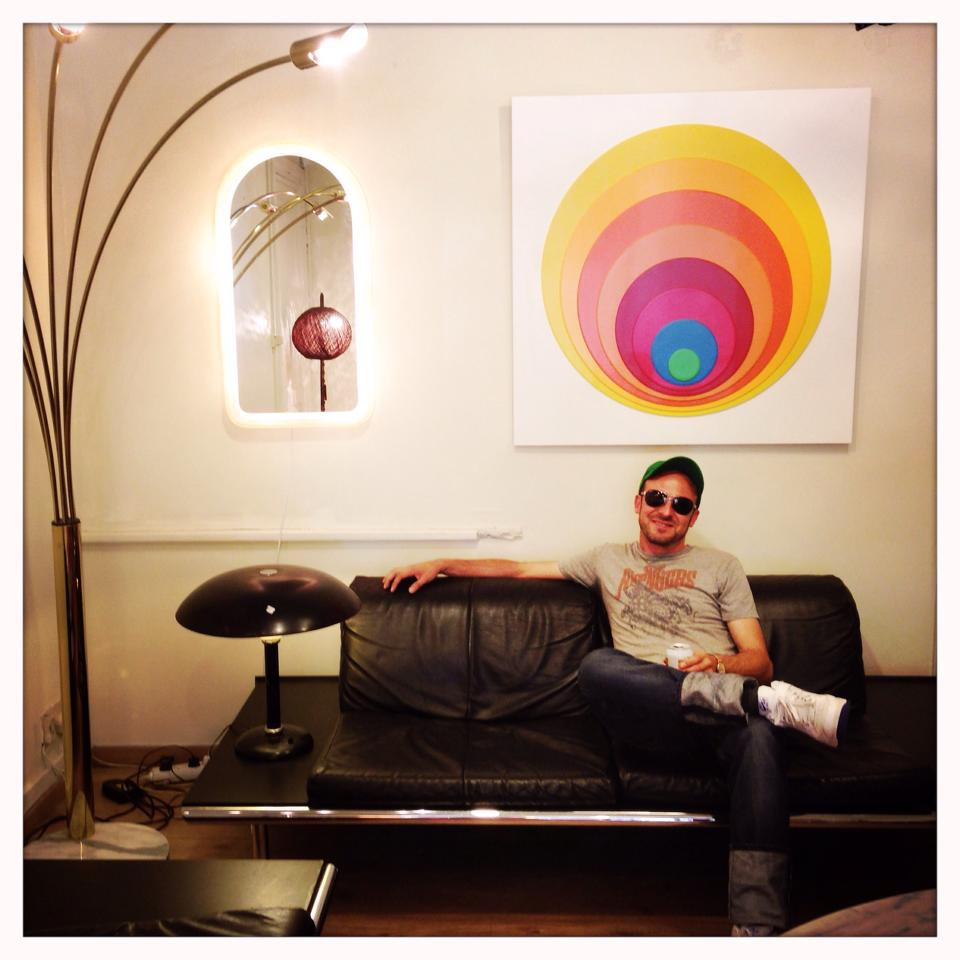

Background information
- Born: Engin Oeztuerk
- Origin: Bremerhaven, Germany
- Genres: Techno, house, electronic
- Occupations: Music producer, composer, mastering and Mixing engineer, Coach
- Years active: 1996–present
- Labels: Suol, Buzzin' Fly. Philpot, Compost, FormResonance, Copasetik Rec.

Engin Oeztuerk also known as Engin Seyrl (born 1973 in Bremerhaven) is a Berlin-based German–Turkish musician.

== Biography ==
Engin Oeztuerk works as a record producer, composer and Mastering- and Mixing-engineer for various projects. His first publications were in 1996. Engins variety of work can be heard in projects like Faruk Green, Holmby Hills, Here Today or Desolé Leo. He also composes and produces music for film and advertising.

== Projects ==
Here Today, Faruk Green, Holmby Hills, Desolé Leo

== Discography (extract) ==
- 1996: Faruk Green – Untitled 7" (33 rpm records)
- 1997: Faruk Green – Faith 7" (33 rpm records)
- 1999: Faruk Green – On The Way To Üsküdar LP (Deck8)
- 2002: Faruk Green – A Certain Mr. Green LP (Copasetik)
- 2007: Here Today – Modernist 12" (Philpot)
- 2008: Here Today – Good News (Buzzin' Fly)
- 2010: Holmby Hills – Bohemia EP (FormResonance)
- 2010: Here Today – Qualify & Satisfy (Suol)
- 2011: Here Today – Down Here (Claqueur Records)

=== Labels (extract) ===
Suol, Buzzin' Fly. Philpot, Compost, FormResonance, Copasetik Rec.
