= Engin Noyan =

Turkish musician and public speaker (born 1953)

Münib Engin Noyan (born 1953) is a Turkish musician of Albanian origin, he achieved fame and success in Turkey in the early part of the 1990s as part of Noyan & Noyan, the group that he founded with his wife, Esen. The duo existed only briefly and their fame derives from their two albums, "Hayat Kırktan Sonra Başlar" (Life Begins After Forty) and "Noyan-Noyan Hava Yollarıyla Yolculuk" (The Travels with Noyan-Noyan Airlines).

== Biography ==
In his early life, Engin Noyan attended the prestigious Özel Alman Lisesi (Deutsche Schule Istanbul) followed by Vienna University, where he studied Philosophy and Theater. On his return to Turkey, he worked for the Istanbul Municipal City Theater as director and writer.

They owed their success largely to their appeal to middle-aged Turkish music listeners. Their songs brought together the love ballads of early 20th century, which were popular with that age group, and a sophisticated grasp of the world culture. By marrying the tango rhythms that had been popular in Turkish classical music in the 1930s with chords from traditional Turkish instruments like ud, and the operatic voice of Esen Noyan with the classical lyrics of Muhlis Sabahaddin Ezgi, they managed to come across both fresh and authentic.

Noyan & Noyan broke up just as their personal life was descending into disaster. Engin Noyan left his wife of many years to join a group that many described as an Islamic cult. In the ensuing scandal, Esin Noyan publicly pleaded her husband to return, while alleging that he had been brainwashed and seduced. The couple later divorced.

Currently, he is a public speaker on traditional and Islamic topics.

== Influence ==
During their brief run, Noyan & Noyan had a noticeable impact on Turkish culture. Their songs "Hatırla Sevgili" and "Yıldızların Altında" had a great deal of airplay on radio and TV. The former song gave its name to a popular TV series.
