= Matthias Jaissle =

German-born football manager (born 1988)

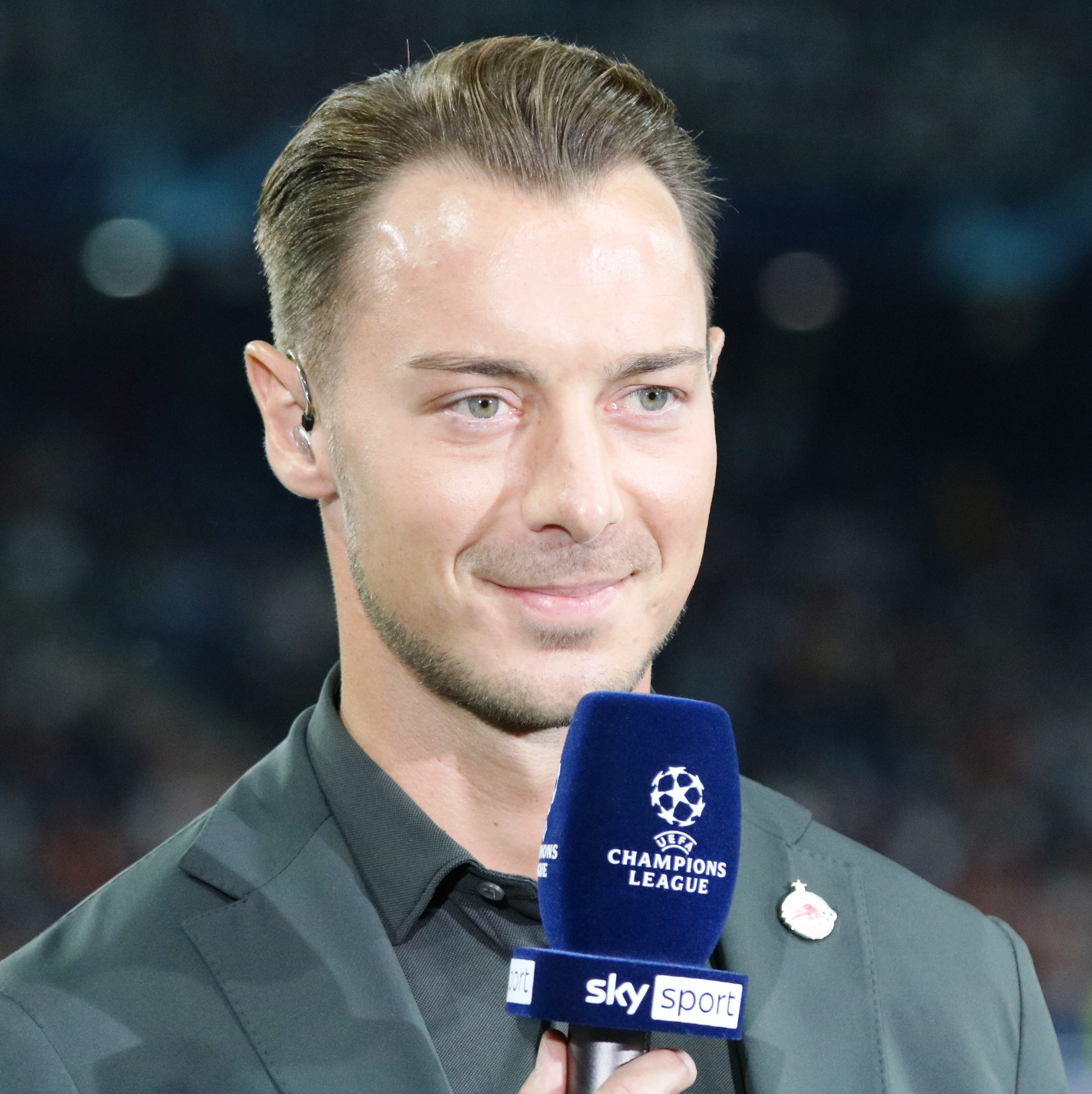
- Jaissle in 2022

Personal information
- Date of birth: 5 April 1988 (age 38)
- Place of birth: Nürtingen, West Germany
- Height: 1.86 m (6 ft 1 in)
- Position: Centre-back

Team information
- Current team: Newcastle United (head coach)

Youth career
- –2001: TSV Neckartailfingen
- 2001–2006: VfB Stuttgart

Senior career*
Years	Team	Apps	(Gls)
2007–2014	TSG Hoffenheim II	8	(0)
2007–2014	TSG Hoffenheim	60	(2)
Total		68	(2)

International career
2009	Germany U21	1	(0)

Managerial career
- 2021: FC Liefering
- 2021–2023: Red Bull Salzburg
- 2023–2026: Al-Ahli
- 2026–: Newcastle United
- * Club domestic league appearances and goals

Matthias Jaissle (born 5 April 1988) is a German professional football manager and former player who is currently the head coach of Premier League club Newcastle United.

Jaissle began his journey as an assistant manager of Brøndby. He became the manager of Liefering in 2021 before moving on to Austrian Bundesliga side Red Bull Salzburg, where he won two league titles and an Austrian Cup, and also led the club to a first-ever UEFA Champions League knockout phase appearance in 2022. After joining Al-Ahli in 2023 and winning back-to-back AFC Champions League titles, he took over Premier League club Newcastle United in 2026.

Jaissle also enjoyed an eleven-year career as a professional player from 2003 to 2014. His position was centre-back, and he was a member of the TSG Hoffenheim team that won promotion to the 2. Bundesliga as well as to the Bundesliga the following season.

== Managerial career ==
On 3 April 2017, it was confirmed that Jaissle would be the assistant of manager Alexander Zorniger of Danish Superliga side Brøndby starting from the summer 2017. He left Brøndby on 1 June 2019. A few weeks later, he was hired as manager of Red Bull Salzburg's U18 academy team.

In January 2021, he was appointed the head coach of Liefering after Bo Svensson left the club. In his first job as a first-team coach, Jaissle managed to lead Liefering to second place in the second tier of Austrian Football, equalling the club’s all-time highest finish (Liefering also finished in second in the 2014/15 season).

=== Red Bull Salzburg ===
In April 2021, it was reported that Jaissle would become the manager of RB Salzburg, succeeding Jesse Marsch, starting from July that year. In the 2021–22 season, he managed to win the domestic double, he also led the club to the Champions League knockout phase for the first time in their history. He then had his contract extended until June 2025. In his second season, he won another league title with Salzburg, and reached the Europa League knockout round play-offs, after finishing third in the Champions League group stage.

On 28 July 2023, one day before the start of the 2023–24 season, he was relieved of his duties, leaving the club without a manager.

=== Al-Ahli ===
Upon his release by Salzburg, Jaissle joined Saudi club Al-Ahli on a three-year contract. With an Al-Ahli side that had just obtained promotion back to the Saudi Pro League (first tier of Saudi football), the German manager led his team to a third-place finish in the 2023–24 season, and achieved qualification to the Asian Champions League. He guided the club to their first-ever continental title in the latter competition, following a 2–0 win over Kawasaki Frontale in the final. In the following season, he managed to win the second consecutive AFC Champions League Elite title after a 1–0 extra-time victory over Machida Zelvia in the final, becoming the first coach to achieve this feat.

=== Newcastle United ===
On 5 August 2026, Jaissle was announced as the head coach of Premier League club Newcastle United, replacing Eddie Howe.

== Managerial statistics ==
As of match played 21 November 2026

Managerial record by team and tenure
Team	From	To	Record								Ref
Team	From	To	G	W	D	L	GF	GA	GD	Win %	Ref
FC Liefering	4 January 2021	30 June 2021	17	11	3	3	42	18	+24	64.71	
Red Bull Salzburg	1 July 2021	28 July 2023	93	64	20	9	205	73	+132	68.82	
Al-Ahli	28 July 2023	5 August 2026	138	90	25	23	294	134	+160	65.22	
Newcastle United	5 August 2026	Present	14	5	4	5	20	23	−3	35.71	
Total			262	170	52	40	562	250	+312	64.89	—

== Honours ==
=== Manager ===
Red Bull Salzburg

- Austrian Bundesliga: 2021–22, 2022–23
- Austrian Cup: 2021–22

Al-Ahli

- Saudi Super Cup: 2025
- AFC Champions League Elite: 2024–25, 2025–26

Individual

- Saudi Pro League Manager of the Month: April 2025, January 2026
