= 2025 Saudi Super Cup =

Tournament details
- Host country: Hong Kong
- City: Hong Kong
- Dates: 19–23 August 2025
- Teams: 4

Final positions
- Champions: Al-Ahli (2nd title)
- Runners-up: Al-Nassr

Tournament statistics
- Matches played: 3
- Goals scored: 13 (4.33 per match)
- Attendance: 77,146 (25,715 per match)
- Top scorer(s): Franck Kessié (3 goals)

The 2025 Saudi Super Cup was the 12th edition of the Saudi Super Cup, an annual football competition for clubs in the Saudi Arabian football league system that were successful in its major competitions in the preceding season.

On 13 June 2025, the Saudi Arabian Football Federation (SAFF) announced that the Super Cup would be held in Hong Kong from 19 to 23 August 2025 after signing a sponsorship deal with SUM KM Sport.

Al-Ahli defeated Al-Nassr 5–3 on a penalty shoot-out after a 2–2 draw in the final, securing their second title and first since 2016.

== Qualification ==
The tournament was supposed to feature the winners and runners-up of the 2024–25 King's Cup and 2024–25 Saudi Pro League. However, since Al-Ittihad were both the Pro League and King's Cup winners, the extra spot was awarded to the Pro League third-placed team.

On 21 July 2025, Pro League runners-up Al-Hilal withdrew from the tournament, citing fitness and scheduling issues following their participation in the 2025 FIFA Club World Cup. Their spot was awarded to the Pro League fifth-placed team, Al-Ahli, as the fourth-placed, Al-Qadsiah, had already qualified based on their King's Cup runners-up performance. On 5 August 2025, the Saudi FF announced that Al-Hilal were banned from participating in the next edition of the Saudi Super Cup and fined them 500,000SAR.

=== Qualified teams ===
The following four teams qualified for the tournament.

Team	Method of qualification	Appearance	Last appearance as	Years performance		
Team	Method of qualification	Appearance	Last appearance as	Winner(s)	Runners-up	Semi-finalists
Al-Ittihad	2024–25 Saudi Pro League and 2024–25 King's Cup winners	5th	2023 runners-up	1	3	–
Al-Qadsiah	2024–25 King's Cup runners-up	1st	0 (debut)	–	–	–
Al-Nassr	2024–25 Saudi Pro League third place	8th	2024 runners-up	2	3	2
Al-Ahli	2024–25 Saudi Pro League fifth place (Note: Al-Ahli replaced the Pro League runners-up Al-Hilal, who withdrew from the competition.)	3rd	2024 semi-finalists	1	–	1

== Draw ==
The draw was held on 19 June 2025 at the AlRiyadiyah headquarters in Riyadh. There was no restriction in it.

== Venue ==
The 2025 Saudi Super Cup took place in Hong Kong between 19 and 23 August. All matches were held at the Hong Kong Stadium.

It was the first time Hong Kong hosted the Super Cup.

2025 Saudi Super Cup (Hong Kong)	Hong Kong
2025 Saudi Super Cup (Hong Kong)	Hong Kong Stadium
2025 Saudi Super Cup (Hong Kong)	Capacity: 40,000

== Matches ==
- Times listed are UTC+08:00.

=== Bracket ===
Semi-finals
19 August 2025 – Hong Kong
Al-Nassr	2
Al-Ittihad	1
20 August 2025 – Hong Kong
Al-Qadsiah	1
Al-Ahli	5

Final
23 August 2025 – Hong Kong
Al-Nassr	2 (3)
Al-Ahli (p)	2 (5)

=== Semi-finals ===
19 August 2025
20:00

Al-Nassr	2–1	Al-Ittihad
Mané 10'; Félix 61'	Report	Bergwijn 16'

Hong Kong Stadium, Hong Kong
Attendance: 30,653
Referee: Khalid Al-Turais

20 August 2025
20:00

Al-Qadsiah	1–5	Al-Ahli
Gastón 8'	Report	Kessié 12', 45+2'; Toney 28' (pen.); Millot 31'; Nacho 61' (o.g.)

Hong Kong Stadium, Hong Kong
Attendance: 16,253
Referee: Ricardo de Burgos Bengoetxea

=== Final ===
23 August 2025
20:00 HKT

Al-Nassr	2–2	Al-Ahli
Ronaldo 41' (pen.); Brozović 82'	Report	Kessié 45+6'; Ibañez 89'
Penalties
Ronaldo (penalty scored); Brozović (penalty scored); Félix (penalty scored); Al-Khaibari (penalty missed)	3–5	(penalty scored) Toney; (penalty scored) Kessié; (penalty scored) Mahrez; (penalty scored) Al-Buraikan; (penalty scored) Galeno

Hong Kong Stadium, Hong Kong
Attendance: 30,240
Referee: Mohammed Al-Hoaish
