= 2024–25 Al-Ahli Saudi FC season =

Al-Ahli
2024–25 season
- President: Khalid Al-Eissa
- Manager: Matthias Jaissle
- Stadium: King Abdullah Sports City
- Pro League: 5th
- King's Cup: Round of 32 (knocked out by Al-Jandal)
- ACL Elite: Winners
- Super Cup: Semi-finals (knocked out by Al-Hilal)
- Top goalscorer: League: Ivan Toney (23); All: Ivan Toney (30)
- Highest home attendance: 58,281 v Kawasaki Frontale; 3 May 2025; AFC Champions League Elite
- Lowest home attendance: 5,193 v Al-Kholood; 17 May 2025; Saudi Pro League
- Average home league attendance: 20,825
| Home colours | Away colours | Third colours |

The 2024–25 season was Al-Ahli's 88th year in existence and 48th season in the Pro League. The club participated in the Pro League, the King's Cup, the AFC Champions League Elite, and the Super Cup.

The season covers the period from 1 July 2024 to 30 June 2025.

== Players ==
=== Squad information ===
As of 1 February 2025

Note: Flags indicate national team as defined under FIFA eligibility rules; some limited exceptions apply. Players may hold more than one non-FIFA nationality.

| No. | Pos. | Nation | Player |
|---|---|---|---|
| 1 | GK | KSA | Abdulrahman Al-Sanbi |
| 3 | DF | BRA | Roger Ibañez |
| 5 | DF | KSA | Mohammed Sulaiman |
| 6 | DF | KSA | Bassam Al-Hurayji |
| 7 | FW | ALG | Riyad Mahrez |
| 8 | MF | KSA | Sumayhan Al-Nabit |
| 9 | FW | KSA | Firas Al-Buraikan |
| 10 | FW | BRA | Roberto Firmino (captain) |
| 11 | MF | BRA | Alexsander |
| 13 | MF | BRA | Galeno |
| 14 | MF | KSA | Eid Al-Muwallad |
| 15 | DF | KSA | Abdullah Al-Ammar |
| 16 | GK | SEN | Édouard Mendy |
| 19 | MF | KSA | Fahad Al-Rashidi |
| 21 | GK | KSA | Emad Feda |

| No. | Pos. | Nation | Player |
|---|---|---|---|
| 24 | MF | ESP | Gabri Veiga |
| 27 | DF | KSA | Ali Majrashi |
| 28 | DF | TUR | Merih Demiral |
| 29 | MF | KSA | Mohammed Al-Majhad |
| 30 | MF | KSA | Ziyad Al-Johani |
| 31 | DF | KSA | Saad Balobaid |
| 32 | DF | BEL | Matteo Dams |
| 45 | MF | KSA | Abdulkarim Darisi |
| 46 | DF | KSA | Rayan Hamed |
| 47 | MF | KSA | Ziyad Al-Ghamdi |
| 62 | GK | KSA | Abdullah Abdo |
| 77 | DF | MKD | Ezgjan Alioski |
| 79 | MF | CIV | Franck Kessie |
| 88 | FW | KSA | Adnan Al-Bishri |
| 99 | FW | ENG | Ivan Toney |

=== Out on loan ===
Note: Flags indicate national team as defined under FIFA eligibility rules; some limited exceptions apply. Players may hold more than one non-FIFA nationality.

| No. | Pos. | Nation | Player |
|---|---|---|---|
| 18 | MF | KSA | Younes Al-Shanqiti (at Al-Shabab until 30 June 2025) |
| 39 | MF | KSA | Yaseen Al-Zubaidi (at Al-Okhdood until 30 June 2025) |
| 49 | MF | KSA | Firas Al-Ghamdi (at Al-Arabi until 30 June 2025) |
| 65 | MF | KSA | Faisal Al-Sibyani (at Damac until 30 June 2025) |

| No. | Pos. | Nation | Player |
|---|---|---|---|
| 73 | MF | KSA | Abdulrahman Al-Humayani (at Al-Anwar until 30 June 2025) |
| 94 | FW | BRA | Marcão (at Kocaelispor until 30 June 2025) |
| 95 | MF | KSA | Ayman Fallatah (at Damac until 30 June 2025) |
| 97 | FW | FRA | Allan Saint-Maximin (at Fenerbahçe until 30 June 2025) |

== Transfers and loans ==
=== Transfers in ===
| Entry date | Position | No. | Player | From club | Fee | Ref. |
|---|---|---|---|---|---|---|
| 30 June 2024 | GK | – | (Saudi Arabia) Ghassan Barqawi | (Saudi Arabia) Al-Ain | End of loan | |
| 30 June 2024 | DF | 13 | (Saudi Arabia) Ibrahim Al-Zubaidi | (Saudi Arabia) Abha | End of loan | |
| 30 June 2024 | DF | 35 | (Saudi Arabia) Ahmed Al-Nakhli | (Saudi Arabia) Al-Kholood | End of loan | |
| 30 June 2024 | MF | 39 | (Saudi Arabia) Yaseen Al-Zubaidi | (Saudi Arabia) Al-Okhdood | End of loan | |
| 30 June 2024 | MF | 92 | (The Gambia) Modou Barrow | (Turkey) Sivasspor | End of loan | |
| 30 June 2024 | FW | 94 | (Brazil) Marcão | (Turkey) Fatih Karagümrük | End of loan | |
| 30 June 2024 | FW | – | (Saudi Arabia) Mourad Khodari | (Saudi Arabia) Al-Okhdood | End of loan | |
| 20 August 2024 | MF | 11 | (Brazil) Alexsander | (Brazil) Fluminense | $10,000,000 | |
| 31 August 2024 | FW | 99 | (England) Ivan Toney | (England) Brentford | $46,000,000 | |
| 29 January 2025 | DF | 32 | (Belgium) Matteo Dams | (Netherlands) PSV Eindhoven | $9,400,000 | |
| 31 January 2025 | MF | 14 | (Saudi Arabia) Eid Al-Muwallad | (Saudi Arabia) Al-Okhdood | Undisclosed | |
| 31 January 2025 | MF | 13 | (Brazil) Galeno | (Portugal) Porto | $46,650,000 | |

=== Transfers out ===
| Exit date | Position | No. | Player | To club | Fee | Ref. |
|---|---|---|---|---|---|---|
| 18 July 2024 | DF | 13 | (Saudi Arabia) Ibrahim Al-Zubaidi | (Saudi Arabia) Al-Orobah | Free | |
| 14 August 2024 | MF | – | (Saudi Arabia) Yazan Madani | (Albania) KF Egnatia | Free | |
| 20 August 2024 | DF | 35 | (Saudi Arabia) Ahmed Al-Nakhli | (Saudi Arabia) Al-Hazem | Free | |
| 20 August 2024 | FW | 91 | (Saudi Arabia) Sultan Al-Suraihi | (Saudi Arabia) Al-Hazem | Free | |
| 23 August 2024 | FW | – | (Saudi Arabia) Mourad Khodari | (Saudi Arabia) Al-Wehda | Free | |
| 26 August 2024 | MF | – | (Saudi Arabia) Zaid Al-Enezi | (Saudi Arabia) Al-Ula | Free | |
| 2 September 2024 | FW | – | (Saudi Arabia) Majed Khalifah | (Saudi Arabia) Al-Kholood | Free | |
| 3 September 2024 | DF | 37 | (Saudi Arabia) Abdulbasit Hindi | (Saudi Arabia) Al-Ettifaq | $1,865,000 | |
| 3 September 2024 | FW | 17 | (Saudi Arabia) Haitham Asiri | (Saudi Arabia) Al-Qadsiah | $2,930,000 | |
| 14 September 2024 | MF | 92 | (The Gambia) Modou Barrow | (Saudi Arabia) Abha | Free | |
| 25 September 2024 | MF | 44 | (Saudi Arabia) Naif Bakri | (Saudi Arabia) Al-Anwar | Free | |
| 29 January 2025 | MF | 40 | (Saudi Arabia) Ali Al-Asmari | (Saudi Arabia) Neom | Undisclosed | |
| 31 January 2025 | DF | 26 | (Saudi Arabia) Fahad Al-Hamad | (Saudi Arabia) Al-Tai | Free | |
| 31 January 2025 | DF | 92 | (Saudi Arabia) Adel Khodari | (Saudi Arabia) Al-Bukiryah | Free | |
| 1 February 2025 | DF | 34 | (Saudi Arabia) Bander Al-Shamrani | (Saudi Arabia) Al-Ain | Free | |
| 2 February 2025 | DF | – | (Saudi Arabia) Saud Tambakti | (Saudi Arabia) Al-Riyadh | Free | |

=== Loans out ===
| Start date | End date | Position | No. | Player | To club | Fee | Ref. |
|---|---|---|---|---|---|---|---|
| 17 July 2024 | End of season | FW | 97 | (France) Allan Saint-Maximin | (Turkey) Fenerbahçe | $8,740,000 | |
| 30 July 2024 | End of season | FW | 94 | (Brazil) Marcão | (Turkey) Kocaelispor | Undisclosed | |
| 23 August 2024 | End of season | MF | 18 | (Saudi Arabia) Younes Al-Shanqiti | (Saudi Arabia) Al-Shabab | None | |
| 29 August 2024 | End of season | MF | 95 | (Saudi Arabia) Ayman Fallatah | (Saudi Arabia) Damac | None | |
| 2 September 2024 | End of season | MF | 65 | (Saudi Arabia) Faisal Al-Sibyani | (Saudi Arabia) Damac | None | |
| 12 September 2024 | End of season | MF | 49 | (Saudi Arabia) Firas Al-Ghamdi | (Saudi Arabia) Al-Arabi | None | |
| 13 September 2024 | End of season | MF | 73 | (Saudi Arabia) Abdulrahman Al-Humayani | (Saudi Arabia) Al-Anwar | None | |
| 31 January 2025 | End of season | MF | 39 | (Saudi Arabia) Yaseen Al-Zubaidi | (Saudi Arabia) Al-Okhdood | None | |

== Pre-season and friendlies ==
| 18 July 2024 Friendly | Al-Ahli (Saudi Arabia) | 1–0 | (Hungary) Újpest | Freistadt, Austria |
| 17:30 CEST | Firmino 10' | Report | | Stadium: Holzhaider-Stadion |

| 23 July 2024 Friendly | Al-Ahli (Saudi Arabia) | 3–1 | (Austria) Blau-Weiß Linz | Linz, Austria |
| 17:00 CEST | Firmino 60' (pen.), 76'; Veiga 71' | Report | | Stadium: Hofmann Personal Stadion |

| 26 July 2024 Friendly | Al-Ahli (Saudi Arabia) | 1–0 | (Qatar) Al-Gharafa | Sankt Leonhard am Forst, Austria |
| 16:00 CEST | Darisi 70' | Report | | Stadium: Sportanlage Sankt Leonhard/Forst |

| 30 July 2024 Friendly | Al-Ahli (Saudi Arabia) | 2–0 | (Saudi Arabia) Al-Riyadh | Seekirchen am Wallersee, Austria |
| 18:30 CEST | Demiral 21'; Mahrez 37' | Report | | Stadium: Sportzentrum Aug |

| 6 August 2024 Friendly | Al-Ahli (Saudi Arabia) | 3–3 | (Austria) Grazer AK | Haus im Ennstal, Austria |
| 12:00 CEST | Ibañez 16'; Al-Rashidi 76'; Firmino 82' | Report | Cipot 13'; Cheukoua 45' (pen.); Zaizen 55' | Stadium: Hauser EnnsbodenArena |

| 16 August 2024 Friendly | Al-Ahli (Saudi Arabia) | 3–3 | (Saudi Arabia) Al-Wehda | Jeddah, Saudi Arabia |
| 19:35 AST | Veiga; Al-Rashidi, | Report | Goodwin,, | Stadium: Prince Mohammed bin Abdullah Al Faisal Stadium |

| 31 December 2024 Friendly | Al-Ahli (Saudi Arabia) | 4–1 | (Saudi Arabia) Jeddah | Jeddah |
| 11:00 | | | | Stadium: Prince Mohammed bin Abdullah Al Faisal Stadium |

| 6 January 2025 Friendly | (Qatar) Al-Wakrah | 2–7 | Al-Ahli (Saudi Arabia) | Al Wakrah, Qatar |
| 18:00 AST | | | | Stadium: Al Janoub Stadium |

== Competitions ==
=== Overview ===
| Competition | Record | | | | | | | |
| Competition | Pld | W | D | L | GF | GA | GD | Win % |
|---|---|---|---|---|---|---|---|---|
| Pro League | 34 | 21 | 4 | 9 | 69 | 36 | +33 | 61.76 |
| King's Cup | 1 | 0 | 0 | 1 | 1 | 2 | −1 | 0.00 |
| ACL Elite | 13 | 12 | 1 | 0 | 34 | 10 | +24 | 92.31 |
| Super Cup | 1 | 0 | 1 | 0 | 1 | 1 | +0 | 0.00 |
| Total | 49 | 33 | 6 | 10 | 105 | 49 | +56 | 67.35 |

Updated to match played 26 May 2025
Source: Competitions

=== Pro League ===
==== League table ====
| Pos | Team | Pld | W | D | L | GF | GA | GD | Pts | Qualification or relegation |
|---|---|---|---|---|---|---|---|---|---|---|
| 3 | Al-Nassr | 34 | 21 | 7 | 6 | 80 | 38 | +42 | 70 | Qualification for AFC Champions League Two group stage (Note: Since the winners of the 2024–25 King's Cup, Al-Ittihad, had already qualified for the Champions League Elite, the spot given to the King's Cup winners (Champions League Two) was passed to the third-placed team.) |
| 4 | Al-Qadsiah | 34 | 21 | 5 | 8 | 53 | 31 | +22 | 68 | |
| 5 | Al-Ahli | 34 | 21 | 4 | 9 | 69 | 36 | +33 | 67 | Qualification for AFC Champions League Elite League stage (Note: By virtue of winning 2024–25 AFC Champions League Elite.) |
| 6 | Al-Shabab | 34 | 18 | 6 | 10 | 65 | 41 | +24 | 60 | Qualification for the AGCFF Gulf Club Champions League group stage (Note: Al-Qadsiah withdrew from AGCFF Gulf Club Champions League, the spot was passed to the next highest-placed team who did not qualified to the Asian club competitions.) |
| 7 | Al-Ettifaq | 34 | 14 | 8 | 12 | 44 | 45 | −1 | 50 | |

Source: SPL
Rules for classification: 1) Points; 2) Head-to-head points; 3) Head-to-head goal difference; 4) Total goal difference; 5) Total goals scored; 6) Fair-play points
(Note: Head-to-head record is used only after all the matches between the teams in question have been played).

==== Results summary ====
| Overall | | | | | | | | Home | | | | | | Away | | | | | |
| Pld | W | D | L | GF | GA | GD | Pts | W | D | L | GF | GA | GD | W | D | L | GF | GA | GD |
|---|---|---|---|---|---|---|---|---|---|---|---|---|---|---|---|---|---|---|---|
| 34 | 21 | 4 | 9 | 69 | 36 | +33 | 67 | 11 | 3 | 3 | 43 | 19 | +24 | 10 | 1 | 6 | 26 | 17 | +9 |

Last updated: 26 May 2025.
Source: Saudi Pro League

==== Results by round ====
| Round | 1 | 2 | 3 | 4 | 5 | 6 | 7 | 8 | 9 | 10 | 11 | 12 | 13 | 14 | 15 | 16 | 17 | 18 | 19 | 20 | 21 | 22 | 23 | 24 | 25 | 26 | 27 | 28 | 29 | 30 | 31 | 32 | 33 | 34 |
|---|---|---|---|---|---|---|---|---|---|---|---|---|---|---|---|---|---|---|---|---|---|---|---|---|---|---|---|---|---|---|---|---|---|---|
| Ground | H | A | A | H | A | H | A | H | A | H | A | H | A | H | A | A | H | A | H | H | A | H | A | H | A | H | A | H | A | H | A | H | H | A |
| Result | W | L | D | W | L | L | W | D | L | W | W | W | W | W | L | W | W | W | W | L | W | W | W | D | L | D | W | W | W | W | L | W | L | W |
| Position | 3 | 8 | 9 | 6 | 7 | 10 | 6 | 8 | 9 | 8 | 7 | 6 | 5 | 5 | 5 | 5 | 5 | 5 | 5 | 5 | 5 | 5 | 5 | 5 | 5 | 5 | 4 | 4 | 4 | 3 | 5 | 5 | 5 | 5 |

Updated to match(es) played on 26 May 2025. Source: SPL
A = Away; H = Home; W = Win; D = Draw; L = Loss

==== Matches ====
All times are local, AST (UTC+3).

Win Draw Loss Postponed

| 23 August 2024 1 | Al-Ahli | 2–0 | Al-Orobah | Jeddah |
| 21:00 | Darisi 32'; Al-Johani (yellow card) 37'; Firmino 80' | Report | Muhar (yellow card) 60'; F. Al-Zubaidi (yellow card) 76'; I. Al-Zubaidi (yellow card) 80' | Stadium: King Abdullah Sports City; Attendance: 20,214; Referee: Sami Al-Jires |

| 27 August 2024 2 | Al-Fateh | 1–0 | Al-Ahli | Al-Hasa |
| 18:45 | Baattiah (yellow card) 26'; Djaniny 54' | Report | Demiral (yellow card) 20'; Majrashi (yellow card) 49' | Stadium: Al-Fateh Club Stadium; Attendance: 7,054; Referee: Abdullah Al-Shehri |

| 13 September 2024 3 | Al-Nassr | 1–1 | Al-Ahli | Riyadh |
| 21:00 | Lajami (yellow card) 90+7'; Al-Hurayji 90+9' (o.g.) | Report | Al-Johani (yellow card) 28'; Kessié 57', (yellow card) 90+11'; Al-Hurayji (yellow card) 83' | Stadium: Al-Awwal Park; Attendance: 23,644; Referee: Sergei Karasev (Russia) |

| 20 September 2024 4 | Al-Ahli | 4–2 | Damac | Jeddah |
| 18:55 | Veiga 13', (yellow card) 88'; Ibañez (yellow card) 30'; Al-Johani (yellow card) 30'; Toney 46', 90+16'; Firmino 90+8' | Report | Fallatah 45+9', (yellow card) 88'; Chafaï 65'; Al-Khaibari (yellow card) 90+5' | Stadium: King Abdullah Sports City; Attendance: 25,471; Referee: Abdullah Al-Harbi |

| 27 September 2024 5 | Al-Qadsiah | 1–0 | Al-Ahli | Dammam |
| 21:00 | Asiri (yellow card) 39'; Aubameyang 43' (pen.); Nández (yellow card) 88' | Report | Al-Johani (yellow card) 90+12' | Stadium: Prince Mohamed bin Fahd Stadium; Attendance: 14,023; Referee: Khaled Al-Teris |

| 5 October 2024 6 | Al-Ahli | 1–2 | Al-Hilal | Jeddah |
| 21:00 | Veiga 12'; Ibañez (yellow card) 37'; Hamed (yellow card) 75'; Majrashi (yellow card) 90' | Report | Mitrović 56', 78' (pen.), (yellow card) 90+4'; S. Al-Dawsari (yellow card) 75' | Stadium: King Abdullah Sports City; Attendance: 53,036; Referee: Slavko Vinčić (Slovenia) |

| 18 October 2024 7 | Al-Khaleej | 0–3 | Al-Ahli | Dammam |
| 17:45 | Al-Fahad (yellow card) 17'; Al-Samiri (red card) 53'; Fortounis (yellow card) 74'; Kourbelis (yellow card) 79' | Report | Mahrez (yellow card) 20'; Al-Buraikan 55'; Toney 70'; Demiral 74'; Majrashi (yellow card) 90+2' | Stadium: Prince Mohamed bin Fahd Stadium; Attendance: 7,193; Referee: Faisal Al-Blwi |

| 25 October 2024 8 | Al-Ahli | 1–1 | Al-Okhdood | Jeddah |
| 21:00 | Al-Hamad (yellow card) 45+5'; Mahrez 62'; Al-Hurayji (yellow card) 90+2' | Report | Khamis (yellow card) 28'; Godwin 45+6', (yellow card) 90+13'; Al-Qaydhi (yellow card) 56'; Pedroza (yellow card) 90+1'; Vítor (yellow card) 90+6' | Stadium: King Abdullah Sports City; Attendance: 11,491; Referee: Abdullah Al-Kharboush |

| 31 October 2024 9 | Al-Ittihad | 1–0 | Al-Ahli | Jeddah |
| 21:00 | Al-Shehri 42'; Al-Amri (yellow card) 50' | Report | Al-Asmari (yellow card) 64'; Ibañez (yellow card) 90+2'; Kessié (yellow card) 90+4' | Stadium: King Abdullah Sports City; Attendance: 52,546; Referee: Jesús Valenzuela (Venezuela) |

| 8 November 2024 10 | Al-Ahli | 2–0 | Al-Raed | Jeddah |
| 18:20 | Balobaid (yellow card) 28'; Veiga 55'; Kessié (yellow card) 67'; Al-Johani (yellow card) 90+2'; Al-Asmari 90+4'; Majrashi (yellow card) 90+8' | Report | Abeid (yellow card) 41'; Hawsawi (yellow card) 45+3'; Al-Dossari (yellow card) 63' | Stadium: King Abdullah Sports City; Attendance: 19,235; Referee: Sami Al-Jires |

| 22 November 2024 11 | Al-Fayha | 0–1 | Al-Ahli | Buraidah |
| 17:50 | Sakala (yellow card) 65' | Report | Mahrez 21' (pen.); Demiral (yellow card) 52'; Al-Hurayji (yellow card) 54' | Stadium: King Abdullah Sports City; Attendance: 999; Referee: Mohammed Al-Hoaish |

| 29 November 2024 12 | Al-Ahli | 1–0 | Al-Wehda | Jeddah |
| 20:00 | Majrashi (yellow card) 42'; Mahrez 55'; Kessié (yellow card) 90+9' | Report | Bacuna (yellow card) 57' | Stadium: Prince Abdullah Al-Faisal Sports City; Attendance: 11,565; Referee: Esteban Ostojich (Uruguay) |

| 7 December 2024 13 | Al-Taawoun | 2–4 | Al-Ahli | Buraidah |
| 20:00 | Pedro 21'; Barrow 23'; Al-Saluli (yellow card) 79' | Report | Ibañez 45+8'; Al-Buraikan 52'; Firmino 63'; Mahrez 73' | Stadium: King Abdullah Sports City; Attendance: 5,118; Referee: Danny Makkelie (Netherlands) |

| 10 January 2025 14 | Al-Ahli | 3–2 | Al-Shabab | Jeddah |
| 20:00 | Toney 1'; Veiga 13', (yellow card) 23'; Balobaid 48'; Majrashi (yellow card) 85' | Report | Cuéllar (yellow card) 28'; Al-Sharari (yellow card) 52'; Kanabah (yellow card) 68'; Demiral 72' (o.g.); Al-Shuwayrikh (yellow card) 81'; Al-Juwayr 90+5' | Stadium: Prince Abdullah Al-Faisal Sports City; Attendance: 18,253; Referee: Szymon Marciniak (Poland) |

| 15 January 2025 15 | Al-Kholood | 1–0 | Al-Ahli | Buraidah |
| 20:00 | Al-Shamrani (yellow card) 79'; Collado 90+2', (yellow card) 90+3' | Report | Demiral (red card) 54'; Al-Johani (yellow card) 71' | Stadium: King Abdullah Sports City; Attendance: 1,193; Referee: Mohammed Al-Hakim (Sweden) |

| 20 January 2025 16 | Al-Ettifaq | 1–2 | Al-Ahli | Dammam |
| 20:00 | Dembélé (yellow card) 23'; Radif (yellow card) 45+1'; Abdulrahman (yellow card) 76'; Wijnaldum 90+1'; Costa (yellow card) 90+3' | Report | Veiga 30'; Mahrez (yellow card) 42'; Firmino 63'; Al-Rashidi (yellow card) 90+6' | Stadium: EGO Stadium; Attendance: 6,403; Referee: Georgi Kabakov (Bulgaria) |

| 26 January 2025 17 | Al-Ahli | 5–0 | Al-Riyadh | Jeddah |
| 18:45 | Toney 4', 72' (pen.); Majrashi (yellow card) 45+4'; Demiral (yellow card) 49'; Al-Johani 60'; Firmino 63'; Mahrez 88' | Report | Al-Shehri (yellow card) 50' | Stadium: King Abdullah Sports City; Attendance: 13,522; Referee: Gustavo Correia (Portugal) |

| 30 January 2025 18 | Al-Orobah | 0–2 | Al-Ahli | Sakakah |
| 17:00 | Al-Rashidi (yellow card) 16'; Guðmundsson (yellow card) 75' | Report | Al-Johani 9', (yellow card) 61'; Balobaid (yellow card) 66'; Al-Majhad (yellow card) 87'; Toney 90+6' (pen.) | Stadium: Al Jouf University Stadium; Attendance: 2,381; Referee: Andrés Matonte (Uruguay) |

| 7 February 2025 19 | Al-Ahli | 2–0 | Al-Fateh | Jeddah |
| 20:00 | Toney 17' (pen.), 62' (pen.), (yellow card) 83'; Balobaid (yellow card) 35' (yellow-red card) 39'; Mahrez (yellow card) 74'; Al-Majhad (yellow card) 77' | Report | Qassem (red card) 14'; Fernandes (yellow card) 65'; Baattiah (yellow card) 86'; Al-Othman (yellow card) 90' | Stadium: Alinma Stadium; Attendance: 16,787; Referee: Kristo Tohver (Estonia) |

| 13 February 2025 20 | Al-Ahli | 2–3 | Al-Nassr | Jeddah |
| 20:30 | Majrashi (yellow card) 45+4'; Al-Johani (yellow card) 59'; Toney 78'; Ibañez (yellow card) 90+3'; Al-Nabit 90+8' | Report | Durán 32', 88', (yellow card) 88'; Simakan (red card) 47'; Yahya 80'; Al-Fatil (yellow card) 90+9' | Stadium: Alinma Stadium; Attendance: 50,144; Referee: César Arturo Ramos (Mexico) |

| 21 February 2025 21 | Damac | 0–2 | Al-Ahli | Abha |
| 16:00 | Al-Rashidi (yellow card) 18'; Al-Khaibari (yellow card) 87' | Report | Toney 4'; Al-Muwallad (yellow card) 45+3'; Hamed (yellow card) 73'; Kessié (yellow card) 75'; Sulaiman (yellow card) 80'; Demiral (yellow card) 82'; Al-Rashidi (yellow card) 90+2'; Mahrez (yellow card) 90+3'; Galeno 90+5' | Stadium: Prince Sultan bin Abdulaziz Sports City; Attendance: 11,023; Referee: Donatas Rumšas (Lithuania) |

| 25 February 2025 22 | Al-Ahli | 4–1 | Al-Qadsiah | Jeddah |
| 20:30 | Toney 11' (pen.), 52' (pen.); Sulaiman 27', (yellow card) 58'; Veiga (yellow card) 40'; Nacho 42' (o.g.) | Report | Álvarez (yellow card) 9'; Thakri (yellow card) 37'; Quiñones 48'; Nández (yellow card) 50' | Stadium: Alinma Stadium; Attendance: 21,775; Referee: Georgi Kabakov (Bulgaria) |

| 28 February 2025 23 | Al-Hilal | 2–3 | Al-Ahli | Riyadh |
| 22:00 | Leonardo (yellow card) 29', (goal) 83' (pen.); S. Al-Dawsari 74'; N. Al-Dawsari (yellow card) 90+1' | Report | Balobaid (yellow card) 6'; Kessié (yellow card) 35'; Toney 47', 53', 87' | Stadium: Kingdom Arena; Attendance: 18,138; Referee: Irfan Peljto (Bosnia and Herzegovina) |

| 7 March 2025 24 | Al-Ahli | 2–2 | Al-Khaleej | Jeddah |
| 22:00 | Al Hamsal 30' (o.g.); Veiga (yellow card) 48'; Demiral (yellow card) 68'; Toney (yellow card) 82'; Galeno 90' | Report | Aboulshamat (yellow card) 45'; Al Salem 45+2'; Martins 45+9'; Hamzi (yellow card) 61' | Stadium: Prince Abdullah Al-Faisal Sports City; Attendance: 13,147; Referee: Cláudio Pereira (Portugal) |

| 15 March 2025 25 | Al-Okhdood | 2–1 | Al-Ahli | Najran |
| 22:00 | Al-Saeed (yellow card) 32'; Vítor (yellow card) 52'; Musona (yellow card) 71'; Pedroza (yellow card) 84'; Petros (yellow card) 90+4'; Al Abbas 90+5', (yellow card) 90+6'; Godwin 90+9' | Report | Lowe 28' (o.g.); Majrashi (yellow card) 59'; Hamed (yellow card) 90+3'; Kessié (yellow card) 90+7'; Al-Nabit (yellow card) 90+7' | Stadium: Prince Hathloul bin Abdulaziz Sports City; Attendance: 2,573; Referee: Anastasios Sidiropoulos (Greece) |

| 5 April 2025 26 | Al-Ahli | 2–2 | Al-Ittihad | Jeddah |
| 21:00 | Ibañez (yellow card) 14', (goal) 51'; Galeno (yellow card) 44'; Toney (yellow card) 45+2', (goal) 82'; Veiga (yellow card) 90+6' | Report | Fabinho (yellow card) 72'; Diaby 74'; Al-Shehri (yellow card) 81'; Benzema 90+4' | Stadium: Alinma Stadium; Attendance: 45,507; Referee: Sergey Ivanov (Russia) |

| 11 April 2025 27 | Al-Raed | 0–2 | Al-Ahli | Buraidah |
| 19:00 | Al-Jayzani (yellow card) 27'; Al-Rajeh (yellow card) 45+5'; Al-Yousef (yellow card) 86' | Report | Majrashi (yellow card) 22'; Kessié 28' (pen.); Veiga 66' | Stadium: King Abdullah Sports City; Attendance: 2,437; Referee: Tamás Bognár (Hungary) |

| 18 April 2025 28 | Al-Ahli | 5–0 | Al-Fayha | Jeddah |
| 19:20 | Ibañez 17', 37'; Al-Johani (yellow card) 27'; Toney 45+3', 68' (pen.); Mahrez 82'; Al-Buraikan (yellow card) 90+3' | Report | Vareta (yellow card) 43'; Mosquera (red card) 48'; Al-Baqawi (yellow card) 62' | Stadium: Prince Abdullah Al-Faisal Sports City; Attendance: 7,446; Referee: Ivan Kružliak (Slovakia) |

| 22 April 2025 29 | Al-Wehda | 2–3 | Al-Ahli | Mecca |
| 19:20 | Al-Hejji (yellow card) 31', (goal) 90+6'; Bacuna (yellow card) 66'; Al-Hafith 81' | Report | Ibañez 6'; Galeno 58'; Mahrez 89' | Stadium: King Abdulaziz Sports City; Attendance: 7,457; Referee: João Pinheiro (Portugal) |

| 7 May 2025 30 | Al-Ahli | 2–0 | Al-Taawoun | Jeddah |
| 19:25 | Sulaiman 10'; Toney 31'; Ibañez (yellow card) 83'; Al-Muwallad (yellow card) 90+5' | Report | Mahzari (yellow card) 51'; Mandash (yellow card) 59'; Girotto (yellow card) 90+2' | Stadium: Prince Abdullah Al-Faisal Sports City; Attendance: 12,821; Referee: Sandro Schärer (Switzerland) |

| 11 May 2025 31 | Al-Shabab | 3–1 | Al-Ahli | Riyadh |
| 19:05 | Al-Thani 26'; Hamdallah 33', 65', (yellow card) 65' (yellow-red card) 76'; Al-Shuwayrikh (yellow card) 40'; Camara (yellow card) 74'; Harboush (yellow card) 75'; Renan (yellow card) 90+6'; Al-Juwayr (yellow card) 90+13'; Carrasco (yellow card) 90+13' | Report | Al-Rashidi (yellow card) 28'; Veiga 36'; Kessié (yellow card) 76'; Toney (yellow card) 78'; Demiral (yellow card) 90+2'; Al-Nabit (yellow card) 90+15' | Stadium: Al-Shabab Club Stadium; Attendance: 6,848; Referee: Felix Zwayer (Germany) |

| 17 May 2025 32 | Al-Ahli | 4–1 | Al-Kholood | Jeddah |
| 21:00 | Majrashi (yellow card) 29'; Ibañez (yellow card) 45+1'; Al-Buraikan 47'; Mahrez 66'; Al-Nabit 77'; Toney 86' (pen.) | Report | Sawaan (yellow card) 44'; H. Al-Shamrani (yellow card) 45+1'; Dams 60' (o.g.); Dieng (yellow card) 65'; Troost-Ekong (yellow card) 84' | Stadium: Prince Abdullah Al-Faisal Sports City; Attendance: 5,193; Referee: Leandro Rey Hilfer (Argentina) |

| 22 May 2025 33 | Al-Ahli | 1–3 | Al-Ettifaq | Jeddah |
| 21:00 | Toney 6' (pen.); Ibañez (yellow card) 53' | Report | Al-Khateeb (yellow card) 4'; Abdulrahman 49'; Wijnaldum 87' (pen.); Al-Olayan 90+5' | Stadium: Prince Abdullah Al-Faisal Sports City; Attendance: 8,412; Referee: Nikola Dabanović (Montenegro) |

| 26 May 2025 34 | Al-Riyadh | 0–1 | Al-Ahli | Riyadh |
| 21:00 | Assiri (yellow card) 24'; Selemani (yellow card) 49' | Report | Toney 16' (pen.); Balobaid (yellow card) 45+6'; Al-Buraikan (yellow card) 53'; Demiral (yellow card) 60' | Stadium: Prince Faisal bin Fahd Sports City Stadium; Attendance: 2,850; Referee: Andris Treimanis (Latvia) |

=== King's Cup ===
All times are local, AST (UTC+3).

| 23 September 2024 Round of 32 | Al-Ahli | 1–2 | Al-Jandal | Jeddah |
| 21:00 | Toney 82' | Report | Matuq 24'; Abo Shahin (yellow card) 26'; Amri 30' (pen.); Comara (yellow card) 36'; Al-Khaibari (yellow card) 45+5'; Moaafa (yellow card) 79'; Salah (yellow card) 89'; Al-Rashed (yellow card) 90+12' | Stadium: Prince Abdullah Al-Faisal Sports City; Attendance: 6,455; Referee: Abdulrahman Al-Sultan |

=== Super Cup ===
| 13 August 2024 Semi-finals | Al-Hilal | 1–1 (4–1 p) | Al-Ahli | Abha, Saudi Arabia |
| 19:15 UTC+3 | Al-Hamdan (yellow card) 77'; Mitrović 90+1' | Report | Majrashi (yellow card) 10'; Firmino 66'; Veiga (yellow card) 80'; Mendy (yellow card) 88'; Kessié (yellow card) 90+3' | Stadium: Prince Sultan bin Abdulaziz Sports City; Attendance: 12,200; Referee: Clément Turpin (France) |
| | Penalties |
| | Neves (penalty scored); S. Al-Dawsari (penalty scored); Mitrović (penalty scored); Milinković-Savić (penalty scored) | | (penalty scored) Firmino; (penalty missed) Veiga; (penalty missed) Ibañez |

=== AFC Champions League Elite ===
==== League stage ====
| Pos | Team | Pld | W | D | L | GF | GA | GD | Pts | Qualification |
|---|---|---|---|---|---|---|---|---|---|---|
| 1 | (Saudi Arabia) Al-Hilal | 8 | 7 | 1 | 0 | 26 | 7 | +19 | 22 | Advance to round of 16 |
| 2 | (Saudi Arabia) Al-Ahli | 8 | 7 | 1 | 0 | 21 | 8 | +13 | 22 | Advance to round of 16 |
| 3 | (Saudi Arabia) Al-Nassr | 8 | 5 | 2 | 1 | 17 | 6 | +11 | 17 | Advance to round of 16 |
| 4 | (Qatar) Al-Sadd | 8 | 3 | 3 | 2 | 10 | 9 | +1 | 12 | Advance to round of 16 |
| 5 | (United Arab Emirates) Al Wasl | 8 | 3 | 2 | 3 | 8 | 12 | −4 | 11 | Advance to round of 16 |
| 6 | (Iran) Esteghlal | 8 | 2 | 3 | 3 | 8 | 9 | −1 | 9 | Advance to round of 16 |
| 7 | (Qatar) Al-Rayyan | 8 | 2 | 2 | 4 | 8 | 12 | −4 | 8 | Advance to round of 16 |
| 8 | (Uzbekistan) Pakhtakor | 8 | 1 | 4 | 3 | 4 | 6 | −2 | 7 | Advance to round of 16 |
| 9 | (Iran) Persepolis | 8 | 1 | 4 | 3 | 6 | 10 | −4 | 7 | |
| 10 | (Qatar) Al-Gharafa | 8 | 2 | 1 | 5 | 10 | 18 | −8 | 7 | |
| 11 | (Iraq) Al-Shorta | 8 | 1 | 3 | 4 | 7 | 17 | −10 | 6 | |
| 12 | (United Arab Emirates) Al Ain | 8 | 0 | 2 | 6 | 11 | 22 | −11 | 2 | |

Source: Asian Football Confederation
Rules for classification: 1) points; 2) goal difference; 3) number of goals scored; 4) number of matches won; 5) penalty shoot-out if only two teams remain tied and played each other on the final matchday 6) fair play ranking; 7) drawing of lots

| 16 September 2024 1 | Al-Ahli (Saudi Arabia) | 1–0 | (Iran) Persepolis | Jeddah, Saudi Arabia |
| 21:00 UTC+3 | Kessié 2'; Al-Ammar (yellow card) 45+6' | Report | El Amloud (yellow card) 24'; Amiri (yellow card) 45+1' | Stadium: Prince Abdullah Al-Faisal Sports City; Attendance: 15,170; Referee: Adham Makhadmeh (Jordan) |

| 30 September 2024 2 | Al Wasl (United Arab Emirates) | 0–2 | (Saudi Arabia) Al-Ahli | Dubai, United Arab Emirates |
| 20:00 UTC+4 | | Report | Mahrez 3'; Ibañez 38'; Al-Sanbi (yellow card) 82' | Stadium: Zabeel Stadium; Attendance: 5,731; Referee: Kim Hee-gon (South Korea) |

| 21 October 2024 3 | Al-Rayyan (Qatar) | 1–2 | (Saudi Arabia) Al-Ahli | Al Rayyan, Qatar |
| 21:00 UTC+3 | Hatem (yellow card) 52'; Al-Hamad 65' (o.g.); Shehata (yellow card) 68'; García (yellow card) 78' | Report | Veiga 16'; Al-Buraikan 38'; Al-Hamad (yellow card) 50'; Ibañez (yellow card) 55'; Majrashi (yellow card) 90+4' | Stadium: Ahmad bin Ali Stadium; Attendance: 8,377; Referee: Ahmed Al-Ali (Kuwait) |

| 4 November 2024 4 | Al-Ahli (Saudi Arabia) | 5–1 | (Iraq) Al-Shorta | Jeddah, Saudi Arabia |
| 19:00 UTC+3 | Firmino 14', 45+5'; Veiga (yellow card) 45+9'; Al-Buraikan 53'; Mahrez 61', 65' | Report | Yahya (yellow card) 26'; Jassim 29'; Qasim (yellow card) 86' | Stadium: King Abdullah Sports City; Attendance: 10,395; Referee: Sadullo Gulmurodi (Tajikistan) |

| 25 November 2024 5 | Al Ain (United Arab Emirates) | 1–2 | (Saudi Arabia) Al-Ahli | Al Ain, United Arab Emirates |
| 20:00 UTC+4 | Rahimi (yellow card) 63'; Kaku 90+3'; Segovia (yellow card) 90+8'; Park Yong-woo (yellow card) 90+9' | Report | Majrashi (yellow card) 38'; Toney 70', 74'; Mendy (yellow card) 90+7'; Kessié (yellow card) 90+8'; Al-Nabit (yellow card) 90+9' | Stadium: Hazza bin Zayed Stadium; Attendance: 17,126; Referee: Adham Makhadmeh (Jordan) |

| 2 December 2024 6 | Al-Ahli (Saudi Arabia) | 2–2 | (Iran) Esteghlal | Jeddah, Saudi Arabia |
| 19:00 UTC+3 | Toney 45+8' (pen.), 86' (pen.); Balobaid (yellow card) 73'; Al-Rashidi (yellow card) 90+1' | Report | Silva 42'; Eslami 51', (red card) 81'; Rezavand (yellow card) 64'; Zakipour (yellow card) 70'; Hosseini (yellow card) 83'; Niknafs (yellow card) 83' | Stadium: King Abdullah Sports City; Attendance: 16,099; Referee: Ma Ning (China) |

| 3 February 2025 7 | Al-Sadd (Qatar) | 1–3 | (Saudi Arabia) Al-Ahli | Doha, Qatar |
| 19:00 UTC+3 | Afif 1' | Report | Firmino 10'; Ibañez 39'; Dams (yellow card) 47'; Mahrez 81' | Stadium: Jassim bin Hamad Stadium; Attendance: 9,335; Referee: Adel Al Naqbi (United Arab Emirates) |

| 17 February 2025 8 | Al-Ahli (Saudi Arabia) | 4–2 | (Qatar) Al-Gharafa | Jeddah, Saudi Arabia |
| 21:00 UTC+3 | Toney 21'; Firmino 34'; Galeno 44'; Mahrez 59' (pen.); Ibañez (yellow card) 79' | Report | Joselu 6' (pen.); Brahimi 80' (pen.) | Stadium: King Abdullah Sports City; Attendance: 12,860; Referee: Omar Al-Ali (United Arab Emirates) |

==== Knockout stage ====
===== Round of 16 =====
| 4 March 2025 Round of 16; First leg | Al-Rayyan (Qatar) | 1–3 | (Saudi Arabia) Al-Ahli | Al Rayyan, Qatar |
| 21:00 UTC+3 | Amaro (yellow card) 45+2'; Guedes 71'; Bareiro (red card) 90+10' | Report | Galeno 30'; Mahrez 34'; Al-Johani (yellow card) 71'; Veiga (yellow card) 86'; Al-Buraikan 90+5' | Stadium: Ahmad bin Ali Stadium; Attendance: 8,836; Referee: Yusuke Araki (Japan) |

| 11 March 2025 Round of 16; Second leg | Al-Ahli (Saudi Arabia) | 2–0 (5–1 agg.) | (Qatar) Al-Rayyan | Jeddah, Saudi Arabia |
| 23:00 UTC+3 | Mahrez 77', 83'; Alexsander (yellow card) 90+3' | Report | Naji (yellow card) 59' | Stadium: King Abdullah Sports City; Attendance: 44,916; Referee: Shaun Evans (Australia) |

===== Finals =====
| 26 April 2025 Quarter-finals | Al-Ahli (Saudi Arabia) | 3–0 | (Thailand) Buriram United | Jeddah, Saudi Arabia |
| 19:30 UTC+3 | Mahrez 4'; Galeno 6'; Firmino 30' | Report | Haiprakhon (yellow card) 45'; Renner (yellow card) 78'; Chaided (yellow card) 88' | Stadium: King Abdullah Sports City; Attendance: 43,027; Referee: Ahmed Al-Kaf (Oman) |

| 29 April 2025 Semi-finals | Al-Hilal (Saudi Arabia) | 1–3 | (Saudi Arabia) Al-Ahli | Jeddah, Saudi Arabia |
| 19:30 UTC+3 | S. Al-Dawsari 42', (yellow card) 80'; Koulibaly (yellow card) 45+9' (yellow-red card) 59'; Mitrović (yellow card) 78'; Al-Yami (yellow card) 84'; Neves (yellow card) 87'; Bounou (yellow card) 90+10' | Report | Alioski (yellow card) 1'; Majrashi (yellow card) 6'; Firmino 9'; Toney 27'; Demiral (yellow card) 45+6'; Al-Buraikan 90+8'; Galeno (yellow card) 90+10' | Stadium: King Abdullah Sports City; Attendance: 50,613; Referee: Adham Makhadmeh (Jordan) |

| 3 May 2025 Final | Al-Ahli (Saudi Arabia) | 2–0 | (Japan) Kawasaki Frontale | Jeddah, Saudi Arabia |
| 19:30 UTC+3 | Galeno 35'; Kessié 42'; Demiral (yellow card) 44'; Al-Johani (yellow card) 85'; Mendy (yellow card) 90+1' | Report | | Stadium: King Abdullah Sports City; Attendance: 58,281; Referee: Abdulrahman Al-Jassim (Qatar) |

== Statistics ==
=== Appearances ===
Last updated on 26 May 2025.

| No. | Pos | Nat | Player | Total | | Pro League | | King's Cup | | ACL Elite | | Super Cup | |
| No. | Pos | Nat | Player | Apps | Goals | Apps | Goals | Apps | Goals | Apps | Goals | Apps | Goals |
Goalkeepers
| 1 | GK | (Saudi Arabia) KSA | Abdulrahman Al-Sanbi | 12 | 0 | 6+2 | 0 | 0 | 0 | 4 | 0 | 0 | 0 |
| 16 | GK | (Senegal) SEN | Édouard Mendy | 39 | 0 | 28 | 0 | 1 | 0 | 9 | 0 | 1 | 0 |
| 62 | GK | (Saudi Arabia) KSA | Abdullah Abdoh | 0 | 0 | 0 | 0 | 0 | 0 | 0 | 0 | 0 | 0 |
Defenders
| 3 | DF | (Brazil) BRA | Roger Ibañez | 46 | 7 | 31 | 5 | 1 | 0 | 13 | 2 | 1 | 0 |
| 5 | DF | (Saudi Arabia) KSA | Mohammed Sulaiman | 21 | 2 | 11+6 | 2 | 0 | 0 | 0+4 | 0 | 0 | 0 |
| 6 | DF | (Saudi Arabia) KSA | Bassam Al-Hurayji | 10 | 0 | 3+3 | 0 | 1 | 0 | 0+2 | 0 | 1 | 0 |
| 15 | DF | (Saudi Arabia) KSA | Abdullah Al-Ammar | 16 | 0 | 5+8 | 0 | 0+1 | 0 | 2 | 0 | 0 | 0 |
| 27 | DF | (Saudi Arabia) KSA | Ali Majrashi | 41 | 0 | 27 | 0 | 1 | 0 | 12 | 0 | 1 | 0 |
| 28 | DF | (Turkey) TUR | Merih Demiral | 44 | 1 | 29+1 | 1 | 1 | 0 | 12 | 0 | 1 | 0 |
| 31 | DF | (Saudi Arabia) KSA | Saad Balobaid | 29 | 1 | 16+6 | 1 | 0 | 0 | 5+2 | 0 | 0 | 0 |
| 32 | DF | (Belgium) BEL | Matteo Dams | 15 | 0 | 8+2 | 0 | 0 | 0 | 4+1 | 0 | 0 | 0 |
| 46 | DF | (Saudi Arabia) KSA | Rayan Hamed | 15 | 0 | 3+9 | 0 | 0 | 0 | 1+2 | 0 | 0 | 0 |
| 77 | DF | (North Macedonia) MKD | Ezgjan Alioski | 6 | 0 | 0 | 0 | 0 | 0 | 3+3 | 0 | 0 | 0 |
Midfielders
| 8 | MF | (Saudi Arabia) KSA | Sumayhan Al-Nabit | 27 | 2 | 1+18 | 2 | 1 | 0 | 1+5 | 0 | 1 | 0 |
| 11 | MF | (Brazil) BRA | Alexsander | 17 | 0 | 6+4 | 0 | 0 | 0 | 2+5 | 0 | 0 | 0 |
| 14 | MF | (Saudi Arabia) KSA | Eid Al-Muwallad | 12 | 0 | 1+9 | 0 | 0 | 0 | 0+2 | 0 | 0 | 0 |
| 19 | MF | (Saudi Arabia) KSA | Fahad Al-Rashidi | 29 | 0 | 1+21 | 0 | 0 | 0 | 1+5 | 0 | 0+1 | 0 |
| 24 | MF | (Spain) ESP | Gabri Veiga | 46 | 8 | 30+2 | 7 | 1 | 0 | 8+4 | 1 | 0+1 | 0 |
| 29 | MF | (Saudi Arabia) KSA | Mohammed Al-Majhad | 5 | 0 | 0+5 | 0 | 0 | 0 | 0 | 0 | 0 | 0 |
| 30 | MF | (Saudi Arabia) KSA | Ziyad Al-Johani | 43 | 2 | 27+3 | 2 | 1 | 0 | 7+4 | 0 | 1 | 0 |
| 45 | MF | (Saudi Arabia) KSA | Abdulkarim Darisi | 14 | 1 | 2+8 | 1 | 0+1 | 0 | 0+2 | 0 | 1 | 0 |
| 47 | MF | (Saudi Arabia) KSA | Ziyad Al-Ghamdi | 0 | 0 | 0 | 0 | 0 | 0 | 0 | 0 | 0 | 0 |
| 79 | MF | (Ivory Coast) CIV | Franck Kessié | 44 | 4 | 29+1 | 2 | 0+1 | 0 | 12 | 2 | 1 | 0 |
Forwards
| 7 | FW | (Algeria) ALG | Riyad Mahrez | 45 | 17 | 31 | 8 | 0 | 0 | 13 | 9 | 1 | 0 |
| 9 | FW | (Saudi Arabia) KSA | Firas Al-Buraikan | 47 | 7 | 22+11 | 3 | 0+1 | 0 | 6+7 | 4 | 0 | 0 |
| 10 | FW | (Brazil) BRA | Roberto Firmino | 31 | 12 | 13+4 | 5 | 1 | 0 | 10+2 | 6 | 1 | 1 |
| 13 | FW | (Brazil) BRA | Galeno | 18 | 7 | 11 | 3 | 0 | 0 | 6+1 | 4 | 0 | 0 |
| 88 | FW | (Saudi Arabia) KSA | Adnan Al-Bishri | 0 | 0 | 0 | 0 | 0 | 0 | 0 | 0 | 0 | 0 |
| 99 | FW | (England) ENG | Ivan Toney | 44 | 30 | 29+1 | 23 | 1 | 1 | 11+2 | 6 | 0 | 0 |
Players sent out on loan this season
| 39 | MF | (Saudi Arabia) KSA | Yaseen Al-Zubaidi | 5 | 0 | 0+2 | 0 | 1 | 0 | 0+2 | 0 | 0 | 0 |
Player who made an appearance this season but have left the club
| 17 | FW | (Saudi Arabia) KSA | Haitham Asiri | 1 | 0 | 0+1 | 0 | 0 | 0 | 0 | 0 | 0 | 0 |
| 26 | DF | (Saudi Arabia) KSA | Fahad Al-Hamad | 5 | 0 | 1+2 | 0 | 0 | 0 | 0+1 | 0 | 0+1 | 0 |
| 37 | DF | (Saudi Arabia) KSA | Abdulbasit Hindi | 1 | 0 | 0 | 0 | 0 | 0 | 0 | 0 | 0+1 | 0 |
| 40 | MF | (Saudi Arabia) KSA | Ali Al-Asmari | 12 | 1 | 3+7 | 1 | 0 | 0 | 1+1 | 0 | 0 | 0 |

=== Goalscorers ===
| Rank | No. | Pos | Nat | Name | Pro League | King's Cup | ACL Elite | Super Cup | Total |
|---|---|---|---|---|---|---|---|---|---|
| 1 | 99 | FW | (England) | Ivan Toney | 23 | 1 | 6 | 0 | 30 |
| 2 | 7 | FW | (Algeria) | Riyad Mahrez | 8 | 0 | 9 | 0 | 17 |
| 3 | 10 | FW | (Brazil) | Roberto Firmino | 5 | 0 | 6 | 1 | 12 |
| 4 | 24 | MF | (Spain) | Gabri Veiga | 7 | 0 | 1 | 0 | 8 |
| 5 | 3 | DF | (Brazil) | Roger Ibañez | 5 | 0 | 2 | 0 | 7 |
| 5 | 9 | FW | (Saudi Arabia) | Firas Al-Buraikan | 3 | 0 | 4 | 0 | 7 |
| 5 | 13 | FW | (Brazil) | Galeno | 3 | 0 | 4 | 0 | 7 |
| 8 | 79 | MF | (Ivory Coast) | Franck Kessié | 2 | 0 | 2 | 0 | 4 |
| 9 | 5 | DF | (Saudi Arabia) | Mohammed Sulaiman | 2 | 0 | 0 | 0 | 2 |
| 9 | 8 | MF | (Saudi Arabia) | Sumayhan Al-Nabit | 2 | 0 | 0 | 0 | 2 |
| 9 | 30 | MF | (Saudi Arabia) | Ziyad Al-Johani | 2 | 0 | 0 | 0 | 2 |
| 12 | 28 | DF | (Turkey) | Merih Demiral | 1 | 0 | 0 | 0 | 1 |
| 12 | 31 | DF | (Saudi Arabia) | Saad Balobaid | 1 | 0 | 0 | 0 | 1 |
| 12 | 40 | MF | (Saudi Arabia) | Ali Al-Asmari | 1 | 0 | 0 | 0 | 1 |
| 12 | 45 | MF | (Saudi Arabia) | Abdulkarim Darisi | 1 | 0 | 0 | 0 | 1 |
| Own goal | | | | | 3 | 0 | 0 | 0 | 3 |
| Total | | | | | 69 | 1 | 34 | 1 | 105 |

Last Updated: 26 May 2025

=== Assists ===
| Rank | No. | Pos | Nat | Name | Pro League | King's Cup | ACL Elite | Super Cup | Total |
|---|---|---|---|---|---|---|---|---|---|
| 1 | 7 | FW | (Algeria) | Riyad Mahrez | 10 | 0 | 8 | 1 | 19 |
| 2 | 10 | FW | (Brazil) | Roberto Firmino | 3 | 0 | 7 | 0 | 10 |
| 3 | 9 | FW | (Saudi Arabia) | Firas Al-Buraikan | 5 | 0 | 2 | 0 | 7 |
| 4 | 24 | MF | (Spain) | Gabri Veiga | 5 | 0 | 1 | 0 | 6 |
| 5 | 13 | FW | (Brazil) | Galeno | 2 | 0 | 3 | 0 | 5 |
| 5 | 79 | MF | (Ivory Coast) | Franck Kessié | 5 | 0 | 0 | 0 | 5 |
| 5 | 99 | FW | (England) | Ivan Toney | 4 | 0 | 1 | 0 | 5 |
| 8 | 3 | DF | (Brazil) | Roger Ibañez | 1 | 0 | 3 | 0 | 4 |
| 9 | 28 | DF | (Turkey) | Merih Demiral | 2 | 0 | 1 | 0 | 3 |
| 9 | 30 | MF | (Saudi Arabia) | Ziyad Al-Johani | 1 | 0 | 2 | 0 | 3 |
| 11 | 11 | MF | (Brazil) | Alexsander | 1 | 0 | 0 | 0 | 1 |
| 11 | 16 | GK | (Senegal) | Édouard Mendy | 1 | 0 | 0 | 0 | 1 |
| 11 | 31 | DF | (Saudi Arabia) | Saad Balobaid | 1 | 0 | 0 | 0 | 1 |
| Total | | | | | 39 | 0 | 28 | 1 | 68 |

Last Updated: 17 May 2025

=== Clean sheets ===
| Rank | No. | Pos | Nat | Name | Pro League | King's Cup | ACL Elite | Super Cup | Total |
|---|---|---|---|---|---|---|---|---|---|
| 1 | 16 | GK | (Senegal) | Édouard Mendy | 12 | 0 | 3 | 0 | 15 |
| 2 | 1 | GK | (Saudi Arabia) | Abdulrahman Al-Sanbi | 1 | 0 | 1 | 0 | 2 |
| Total | | | | | 13 | 0 | 4 | 0 | 17 |

Last Updated: 26 May 2025
