= 2025–26 Al Hilal SFC season =

Al-Hilal
2025–26 season
- President: Nawaf bin Saad
- Head coach: Simone Inzaghi
- Stadium: Kingdom Arena
- Pro League: 2nd
- King's Cup: Winners
- ACL Elite: Round of 16
- Top goalscorer: League: Marcos Leonardo (13); All: Marcos Leonardo (19)
Home colours	Away colours	Third colours

The 2025–26 season was Al Hilal's 50th consecutive season in the top flight of Saudi football and 68th year in existence as a football club. The club participated in the Pro League, the King's Cup, and the AFC Champions League Elite.

On 21 May 2026, Al-Hilal completed the 2025–26 Saudi Pro League season unbeaten after a 1–0 win against Al-Fahya on the final matchday. This was their third undefeated season in the club's history, and their first since the 2023–24 season.

The season covered the period from 1 July 2025 to 30 June 2026.

== Players ==
=== Squad information ===
As of 9 August 2025

Note: Flags indicate national team as defined under FIFA eligibility rules; some limited exceptions apply. Players may hold more than one non-FIFA nationality.

No.	Pos.	Nation	Player
3	DF	SEN	Kalidou Koulibaly
4	DF	KSA	Khalifah Al-Dawsari
5	DF	KSA	Ali Al-Bulaihi
6	DF	BRA	Renan Lodi
7	FW	URU	Darwin Núñez
8	MF	POR	Ruben Neves
11	FW	BRA	Marcos Leonardo
15	FW	KSA	Mohammed Al-Qahtani
16	MF	KSA	Nasser Al-Dawsari
17	GK	KSA	Mohammed Al-Rubaie
19	DF	FRA	Théo Hernandez
22	MF	SRB	Sergej Milinković-Savić
24	DF	KSA	Moteb Al-Harbi
27	MF	BRA	Kaio César

No.	Pos.	Nation	Player
28	MF	KSA	Mohamed Kanno
29	MF	KSA	Salem Al-Dawsari
33	DF	KSA	Mohammed Al-Muhaysh
34	DF	KSA	Saleh Barnawi
37	GK	MAR	Yassine Bounou
38	FW	KSA	Turki Al-Ghumail
39	FW	KSA	Abdulaziz Hadhood
40	GK	KSA	Ahmed Abu Rasen
45	FW	KSA	Abdulkarim Darisi
50	GK	KSA	Abdulelah Al-Ghamdi
77	FW	BRA	Malcom
87	DF	KSA	Hassan Al-Tambakti
88	DF	KSA	Hamad Al-Yami
99	FW	KSA	Abdullah Al-Hamdan

== Transfers and loans ==
=== Transfers in ===
Entry date	Position	No.	Player	From club	Fee	Ref.
30 June 2025	DF	58	(Saudi Arabia) Mohammed Barnawi	(Saudi Arabia) Al-Orobah	End of loan	
30 June 2025	MF	18	(Saudi Arabia) Musab Al-Juwayr	(Saudi Arabia) Al-Shabab	End of loan	
30 June 2025	MF	26	(Saudi Arabia) Abdulellah Al-Malki	(Saudi Arabia) Al-Ettifaq	End of loan	
30 June 2025	MF	33	(Saudi Arabia) Abdullah Al-Zaid	(Saudi Arabia) Neom	End of loan	
30 June 2025	MF	39	(Saudi Arabia) Mohammed Al-Zaid	(Saudi Arabia) Al-Bukiryah	End of loan	
30 June 2025	MF	44	(Saudi Arabia) Suhayb Al-Zaid	(Saudi Arabia) Al-Fateh	End of loan	
30 June 2025	FW	20	(Saudi Arabia) Abdullah Radif	(Saudi Arabia) Al-Ettifaq	End of loan	
1 July 2025	MF	45	(Saudi Arabia) Abdulkarim Darisi	(Saudi Arabia) Al-Ahli	Free	
10 July 2025	DF	19	(France) Théo Hernandez	(Italy) AC Milan	$29,300,000	
9 August 2025	FW	7	(Uruguay) Darwin Núñez	(England) Liverpool	$61,750,000	
1 September 2025	DF	4	(Turkey) Yusuf Akçiçek	(Turkey) Fenerbahçe	$25,750,000	
8 September 2025	GK	25	(France) Mathieu Patouillet	(France) Lyon	$400,000	
10 January 2026	DF	30	(Spain) Pablo Marí	(Italy) Fiorentina	$2,360,000	
10 January 2026	MF	23	(Saudi Arabia) Sultan Mandash	(Saudi Arabia) Al-Taawoun	$4,000,000	
21 January 2026	GK	35	(Saudi Arabia) Rayan Al-Dossary	(Saudi Arabia) Al-Khaleej	$4,800,000	
21 January 2026	MF	18	(Saudi Arabia) Murad Hawsawi	(Saudi Arabia) Al-Khaleej	$8,000,000	

=== Transfers out ===
Exit date	Position	No.	Player	To club	Fee	Ref.
1 July 2025	GK	21	(Saudi Arabia) Mohammed Al-Owais	(Saudi Arabia) Al-Ula	Free	
1 July 2025	DF	58	(Saudi Arabia) Mohammed Barnawi	(Saudi Arabia) Al-Ittihad	Free	
5 July 2025	MF	7	(Saudi Arabia) Khalid Al-Ghannam	(Saudi Arabia) Al-Ettifaq	End of loan	
5 July 2025	FW	10	(Morocco) Abderrazak Hamdallah	(Saudi Arabia) Al-Shabab	End of loan	
28 July 2025	DF	12	(Saudi Arabia) Yasser Al-Shahrani	(Saudi Arabia) Al-Qadsiah	Free	
3 August 2025	MF	18	(Saudi Arabia) Musab Al-Juwayr	(Saudi Arabia) Al-Qadsiah	$13,330,000	
27 August 2025	DF	4	(Saudi Arabia) Khalifah Al-Dawsari	(Saudi Arabia) Neom	Undisclosed	
4 September 2025	FW	9	(Serbia) Aleksandar Mitrović	(Qatar) Al-Rayyan	Free	
14 January 2026	MF	89	(Saudi Arabia) Abdulellah Al-Malki	(Saudi Arabia) Al-Diriyah	Free	

=== Loans out ===
Start date	End date	Position	No.	Player	To club	Fee	Ref.
10 January 2026	End of season	MF	15	(Saudi Arabia) Mohammed Al-Qahtani	(Saudi Arabia) Al-Taawoun	None	
13 January 2026	End of season	DF	20	(Portugal) João Cancelo	(Spain) Barcelona	None	

== Pre-season and friendlies ==
6 August 2025 Friendly	Al-Hilal (Saudi Arabia)	6–1	(Germany) TSG Balingen	Balingen, Austria
18:30 CEST	Milinković-Savić 22'; S. Al-Dawsari 31'; Al-Hamdan 33'; Al-Harbi 66'; Radif 69'; César 86'	Report	Moutassime 53'	Stadium: Bizerba Arena

10 August 2025 Friendly	Al-Hilal (Saudi Arabia)	6–0	(Switzerland) Aarau	Aarau, Switzerland
17:30 CEST	Petit 21'; Milinković-Savić 25'; Fofana 39' (o.g.); Kanno 51', 66'; Núñez 88'	Report		Stadium: Stadion Brügglifeld

14 August 2025 Friendly	Al-Hilal (Saudi Arabia)	3–2	(Germany) Waldhof Mannheim	Balingen, Austria
18:00 CEST	Hernández 21'; Cancelo 25'; Núñez 33'	Report	Okpala 7'; Michel 36'	Stadium: Bizerba Arena

23 August 2025 Friendly	Al-Hilal (Saudi Arabia)	4–0	(Saudi Arabia) Al-Fayha	Riyadh, Saudi Arabia
19:00 AST	Milinković-Savić; Neves; Al-Harbi; Núñez	Report		Stadium: Al-Hilal Club Stadium

== Competitions ==
=== Overview ===
Competition	First match	Last match	Starting round	Final position	Record							
Competition	First match	Last match	Starting round	Final position	Pld	W	D	L	GF	GA	GD	Win %
Pro League	29 August 2025	21 May 2026	Matchday 1	2nd	34	25	9	0	85	27	+58	73.53
King's Cup	22 September 2025	8 May 2026	Round of 32	Winners	5	4	1	0	9	3	+6	80.00
ACL Elite	16 September 2025	13 April 2026	League stage	Round of 16	9	7	2	0	20	9	+11	77.78
Total					48	36	12	0	114	39	+75	75.00

Source: Competitions

=== Pro League ===
==== League table ====
Pos	Team	Pld	W	D	L	GF	GA	GD	Pts	Qualification or relegation
1	Al-Nassr (C)	34	28	2	4	91	28	+63	86	Qualification for AFC Champions League Elite league stage (Note: Al-Ahli also qualified as 2025–26 AFC Champions League Elite winners.)
2	Al-Hilal	34	25	9	0	85	27	+58	84	Qualification for AFC Champions League Elite league stage
3	Al-Ahli	34	25	6	3	71	25	+46	81	Qualification for AFC Champions League Elite league stage
4	Al-Qadsiah	34	23	8	3	83	34	+49	77	Qualification for AFC Champions League Elite league stage
5	Al-Ittihad	34	16	7	11	55	48	+7	55	Qualification for AFC Champions League Elite preliminary stage

Source: SPL
Rules for classification: 1) Points; 2) Head-to-head points; 3) Head-to-head goal difference; 4) Total goal difference; 5) Total goals scored; 6) Fair-play points
(Note: Head-to-head record is used only after all the matches between the teams in question have been played).
(C) Champions

==== Results summary ====
Overall								Home						Away					
Pld	W	D	L	GF	GA	GD	Pts	W	D	L	GF	GA	GD	W	D	L	GF	GA	GD
34	25	9	0	85	27	+58	84	13	4	0	41	11	+30	12	5	0	44	16	+28

Source: Saudi Pro League

==== Results by round ====
Round	1	2	3	4	5	6	7	8	9	11	12	13	14	15	16	17	18	19	20	21	22	23	10	24	25	26	27	28	29	30	31	32	33	34
Ground	H	H	A	H	A	A	H	A	H	H	A	A	H	H	A	H	A	A	H	A	H	H	A	A	H	A	H	A	H	H	A	A	H	A
Result	W	D	D	W	W	W	W	W	W	W	W	W	W	W	W	D	D	D	W	W	W	D	D	W	W	W	D	W	W	W	W	D	W	W
Position	5	5	7	6	4	3	3	3	2	2	2	1	1	1	1	1	1	1	1	1	2	3	3	3	3	2	2	2	2	2	2	2	2	2

Source: Saudi Pro League
A = Away; H = Home; W = Win; D = Draw; L = Loss

==== Matches ====
All times are local, AST (UTC+3).

Win Draw Loss Postponed

29 August 2025 1	Al-Hilal	2–0	Al-Riyadh	Riyadh
18:50	Al-Harbi 22'; Malcom 45+3'	Report	Okou (yellow card) 45+1'	Stadium: Kingdom Arena; Attendance: 21,901; Referee: Majed Al-Shamrani

13 September 2025 2	Al-Hilal	2–2	Al-Qadsiah	Riyadh
21:00	Núñez 49'; Koulibaly (yellow card) 70'; Neves 73' (pen.); Al-Tambakti (yellow card) 76'	Report	Bonsu Baah 6'; Quiñones 50'; Retegui (yellow card) 59'	Stadium: Kingdom Arena; Attendance: 17,875; Referee: Juan Martínez Munuera (Spain)

19 September 2025 3	Al-Ahli	3–3	Al-Hilal	Jeddah
21:00	Ibañez (yellow card) 36'; Toney 78', 87'; Demiral 90+1'	Report	Hernández 12'; Malcom 24', 41'; Neves (yellow card) 52'	Stadium: Alinma Stadium; Attendance: 51,257; Referee: Alireza Faghani (Iran)

25 September 2025 4	Al-Hilal	3–1	Al-Okhdood	Riyadh
21:00	Koulibaly (yellow card) 25'; Leonardo 45', 79'; Hernández 45+4'	Report	Narey 14'; Kramer (yellow card) 45+6'; Gül (yellow card) 72'; Asiri (yellow card) 83'; Hawsawi (yellow card) 90+3'	Stadium: Kingdom Arena; Attendance: 16,540; Referee: Erik Lambrechts (Belgium)

18 October 2025 5	Al-Ettifaq	0–5	Al-Hilal	Dammam
17:45		Report	Leonardo 23', 55'; N. Al-Dawsari (yellow card) 29'; Núñez 39', 74'; Neves 48' (pen.)	Stadium: EGO Stadium; Attendance: 10,187; Referee: Sebastian Gishamer (Austria)

24 October 2025 6	Al-Ittihad	0–2	Al-Hilal	Jeddah
21:00	Al-Mousa (yellow card) 18'; Mitaj (yellow card) 28'; Doumbia (yellow card) 90+2'	Report	Koulibaly (yellow card) 15'; Doumbia 41' (o.g.); Leonardo 57'; Hernández (yellow card) 68'	Stadium: Alinma Stadium; Attendance: 46,542; Referee: Darío Herrera (Argentina)

31 October 2025 7	Al-Hilal	1–0	Al-Shabab	Riyadh
17:50	Leonardo 36'; Koulibaly (red card) 78'; N. Al-Dawsari (yellow card) 83'; Neves (yellow card) 90'	Report	Al-Othman (yellow card) 12'; Al-Subiani (yellow card) 73'; Hernández (yellow card) 90+1'	Stadium: Kingdom Arena; Attendance: 22,293; Referee: Georgi Kabakov (Bulgaria)

7 November 2025 8	Al-Najma	2–4	Al-Hilal	Buraidah
20:30	Lázaro 3', (red card) 58'; Neves 60' (o.g.); Braga (yellow card) 73'; El Yamiq (red card) 76'	Report	S. Al-Dawsari 10', 90'; Akçiçek (yellow card) 52'; Hernández (yellow card) 67', (goal) 71'; Neves 78'; César (yellow card) 90+6'	Stadium: King Abdullah Sports City; Attendance: 12,641; Referee: Alejandro Muñiz Ruiz (Spain)

22 November 2025 9	Al-Hilal	2–1	Al-Fateh	Riyadh
20:30	Núñez 26'; Milinković-Savić (yellow card) 68'; N. Al-Dawsari (red card) 79'; Neves 88' (pen.); Koulibaly (yellow card) 90+8'	Report	Batna 9'; Al-Jari (yellow card) 31'; Al-Tambakti (yellow card) 90+3'	Stadium: Kingdom Arena; Attendance: 19,200; Referee: Horațiu Feșnic (Romania)

26 December 2025 11	Al-Hilal	3–2	Al-Khaleej	Riyadh
20:30	Kanno 18'; Milinković-Savić 39'; Malcom 57'; Al-Tambakti (yellow card) 65'; Hernández (yellow card) 90+1'	Report	Al-Khabrani (yellow card) 24'; Schenkeveld (yellow card) 38'; Kanabah (yellow card) 41'; King 79'; Masouras 84'	Stadium: Kingdom Arena; Attendance: 13,300; Referee: Serdar Gözübüyük (Netherlands)

31 December 2025 12	Al-Kholood	1–3	Al-Hilal	Buraidah
20:30	Al-Dawsari (red card) 37'; Enrique 45+5' (pen.), (yellow card) 81'; Cozzani (yellow card) 61'	Report	Milinković-Savić 45'; Hernández 61', 84'; César (yellow card) 72'	Stadium: King Abdullah Sports City; Attendance: 9,253; Referee: Donatas Rumšas (Lithuania)

4 January 2026 13	Damac	0–2	Al-Hilal	Abha
20:30	Al-Najei (yellow card) 90+3'	Report	Al-Yami (yellow card) 16'; Núñez 35'; Kanno (yellow card) 41'; Leonardo 53'; Hernández (yellow card) 90+2'	Stadium: Prince Sultan bin Abdulaziz Sports City Stadium; Attendance: 14,873; Referee: Erik Lambrechts (Belgium)

8 January 2026 14	Al-Hilal	3–0	Al-Hazem	Riyadh
17:55	Milinković-Savić 29'; Neves 56'; Núñez 90'	Report		Stadium: Kingdom Arena; Attendance: 14,920; Referee: Glenn Nyberg (Sweden)

12 January 2026 15	Al-Hilal	3–1	Al-Nassr	Riyadh
20:30	S. Al-Dawsari 57' (pen.); Neves (yellow card) 58', (goal) 90+2' (pen.); Kanno 81'	Report	Ronaldo 42'; Brozović (yellow card) 53'; Al-Aqidi (red card) 60'; Al-Khaibari (yellow card) 65'	Stadium: Kingdom Arena; Attendance: 24,060; Referee: François Letexier (France)

18 January 2026 16	Neom	1–2	Al-Hilal	Tabuk
20:30	Al-Breik 42'; Abdi (yellow card) 65'	Report	Milinković-Savić (yellow card) 44'; Al-Tambakti 49'; Marí (yellow card) 61'; Neves 66' (pen.)	Stadium: King Khalid Sport City Stadium; Attendance: 7,491; Referee: Javier Alberola Rojas (Spain)

22 January 2026 17	Al-Hilal	4–1	Al-Fayha	Riyadh
20:30	Milinković-Savić 37'; Mosquera 45' (o.g.); Kanno 61'; Neves (yellow card) 90'; Leonardo 90'	Report	Sakala 14'; Al-Rammah (yellow card) 88'	Stadium: Kingdom Arena; Attendance: 17,920; Referee: Sergei Karasev (Russia)

25 January 2026 18	Al-Riyadh	1–1	Al-Hilal	Riyadh
20:30	Bayesh 58'; Tombakti (yellow card) 78' (yellow-red card) 90+1'; Okou (yellow card) 89'	Report	Leonardo 26', (yellow card) 49'; Marí (yellow card) 30'	Stadium: Prince Faisal bin Fahd Sports City Stadium; Attendance: 4,480; Referee: Jesús Valenzuela (Venezuela)

29 January 2026 19	Al-Qadsiah	2–2	Al-Hilal	Dammam
20:30	Nández 10', (yellow card) 22'; Thakri (yellow card) 44'; Quiñones 76'; Bonsu Baah (yellow card) 89'	Report	Neves 8'; Malcom (yellow card) 16'; Kanno (yellow card) 22'; Al-Tambakti (yellow card) 59'; S. Al-Dawsari 90'	Stadium: Prince Mohamed bin Fahd Stadium; Attendance: 17,351; Referee: Raphael Claus (Brazil)

2 February 2026 20	Al-Hilal	0–0	Al-Ahli	Riyadh
20:30		Report		Stadium: Kingdom Arena; Attendance: 23,632; Referee: Yael Falcón Pérez (Argentina)

5 February 2026 21	Al-Okhdood	0–6	Al-Hilal	Najran
20:30		Report	Benzema 31', 60', 64'; Malcom 70'; Al-Dawsari 74', 90+3'	Stadium: Prince Hathloul bin Abdulaziz Sports City Stadium; Attendance: 6,496; Referee: Gustavo Tejera (Uruguay)

13 February 2026 22	Al-Hilal	2–0	Al-Ettifaq	Riyadh
18:25	Kanno 13'; Al-Dawsari 31'	Report		Stadium: Kingdom Arena; Attendance: 22,230; Referee: István Kovács (Romania)

21 February 2026 23	Al-Hilal	1–1	Al-Ittihad	Riyadh
22:00	Malcom 5'	Report	Aouar 53'	Stadium: Kingdom Arena; Attendance: 22,264; Referee: Ricardo de Burgos Bengoetxea (Spain)

24 February 2025 10	Al-Taawoun	1–1	Al-Hilal	Buraidah
22:00	Martínez 45+4' (pen.)	Report	Neves 41' (pen.)	Stadium: King Abdullah Sports City; Attendance: 4,842; Referee: Mario Escobar (Guatemala)

27 February 2026 24	Al-Shabab	3–5	Al-Hilal	Riyadh
22:00	Brownhill 13'; Hamdallah 44'; Adli 75'	Report	Kanno 19'; Al-Bulaihi 31' (o.g.); Koulibaly 45+2'; Mandash 48'; Leonardo 52'	Stadium: Al-Shabab Club Stadium; Attendance: 7,919; Referee: Sebastian Gishamer (Austria)

6 March 2026 25	Al-Hilal	4–0	Al-Najma	Riyadh
22:00	Benzema 43', 81'; Malcom 84'; Milinković-Savić 86'	Report		Stadium: Kingdom Arena; Attendance: 9,000; Referee: Amin Omar (Egypt)

14 March 2026 26	Al-Fateh	0–1	Al-Hilal	Al-Hasa
22:00		Report	Milinković-Savić 48'	Stadium: Prince Abdullah bin Jalawi Stadium; Attendance: 6,035; Referee: Cristián Garay (Chile)

4 April 2026 27	Al-Hilal	2–2	Al-Taawoun	Riyadh
21:00	Meïté 43'; Leonardo 77'	Report	Girotto 55', 67'	Stadium: Kingdom Arena; Attendance: 11,391; Referee: Luís Godinho (Portugal)

8 April 2026 29	Al-Hilal	6–0	Al-Kholood	Riyadh
21:00	Al-Harbi 7'; Benzema 8', 31', 45+5'; Al-Dawsari 55'; Leonardo 76'	Report		Stadium: Kingdom Arena; Attendance: 12,684; Referee: Sven Jablonski (Germany)

28 April 2026 30	Al-Hilal	1–0	Damac	Riyadh
21:00	Milinković-Savić 18'	Report		Stadium: Kingdom Arena; Attendance: 12,782; Referee: Rade Obrenović (Slovenia)

2 May 2026 31	Al-Hazem	0–3	Al-Hilal	Buraydah
21:00		Report	Benzema 9'; Leonardo 82'; Neves 90+3' (pen.)	Stadium: King Abdullah Sports City; Attendance: 4,587; Referee: Nikola Dabanović (Montenegro)

5 May 2026 28	Al-Khaleej	1–2	Al-Hilal	Dammam
21:00	King 11'	Report	Milinković-Savić 34'; Mandash 79'	Stadium: Prince Mohamed bin Fahd Stadium; Attendance: 17,832; Referee: Andris Treimanis (Latvia)

12 May 2026 32	Al-Nassr	1–1	Al-Hilal	Riyadh
21:00	Simakan 37'	Report	Bento 90+8' (o.g.)	Stadium: Al-Awwal Park; Attendance: 26,003; Referee: Donatas Rumšas (Lithuania)

16 May 2026 33	Al-Hilal	2–0	Neom	Riyadh
19:05	Neves 10' (pen.); Mandash 58'	Report		Stadium: Kingdom Arena; Attendance: 16,685; Referee: Anastasios Sidiropoulos (Greece)

21 May 2026 34	Al-Fayha	0–1	Al-Hilal	Buraidah
21:00		Report	Mandash 4'	Stadium: King Abdullah Sports City; Attendance: 6,664; Referee: Ivan Kružliak (Slovakia)

=== King's Cup ===
All times are local, AST (UTC+3).

22 September 2025 Round of 32	Al-Adalah	0–1	Al-Hilal	Al-Hasa
21:30	Cunha (yellow card) 76'	Report	Al-Hamdan 45+2'	Stadium: Prince Abdullah bin Jalawi Stadium; Attendance: 12,849; Referee: Juan Benítez (Paraguay)

28 October 2025 Round of 16	Al-Okhdood	0–1	Al-Hilal	Najran
18:10	Borrell (yellow card) 24'; Al-Qaydhi (yellow card) 45'	Report	Al-Hamdan (yellow card) 36'; Leonardo 45+3' (pen.)	Stadium: Prince Hathloul bin Abdulaziz Sports City Stadium; Attendance: 5,740; Referee: Slavko Vinčić (Slovenia)

29 November 2025 Quarter-finals	Al-Hilal	4–1	Al-Fateh	Riyadh
17:40	Malcom 21'; Neves 23', (yellow card) 26'; Al-Tombakti 35'; Leonardo 49'	Report	Vargas 90+2'	Stadium: Kingdom Arena; Attendance: 19,100; Referee: Donatas Rumšas (Lithuania)

18 March 2026 Semi-finals	Al-Ahli	1–1 (a.e.t.) (2–4 p)	Al-Hilal	Jeddah
22:00	Toney 81' (pen.)	Report	Hernandez 39'	Stadium: King Abdullah Sports City Stadium; Attendance: 46,519; Referee: Leandro Rey Hilfer (Argentina)
	Penalties
	Toney (penalty missed); Kessié (penalty scored); Galeno (penalty missed); Al-Johani (penalty scored)		(penalty scored) Neves; (penalty scored) Leonardo; (penalty scored) Mandash; (penalty scored) Hernandez

8 May 2026 Final	Al-Kholood	1–2	Al-Hilal	Jeddah
21:00	Enrique 4'	Report	N. Al-Dawsari 42'; Hernandez 45+2'	Stadium: King Abdullah Sports City Stadium; Attendance: 55,857; Referee: Daniel Siebert (Germany)

=== AFC Champions League Elite ===
==== League stage ====
Pos	Team	Pld	W	D	L	GF	GA	GD	Pts	Qualification
1	(Saudi Arabia) Al Hilal	8	7	1	0	17	6	+11	22	Advance to round of 16
2	(Saudi Arabia) Al-Ahli	8	5	2	1	21	9	+12	17	Advance to round of 16
3	(Iran) Tractor	8	5	2	1	12	4	+8	17	Advance to round of 16
4	(Saudi Arabia) Al-Ittihad	8	5	0	3	22	9	+13	15	Advance to round of 16
5	(United Arab Emirates) Al Wahda	8	4	2	2	11	7	+4	14	Advance to round of 16

Source: AFC
Rules for classification: 1) points; 2) goal difference; 3) number of goals scored; 4) number of matches won; 5) penalty shoot-out if only two teams remain tied and played each other on the final matchday 6) fair play ranking; 7) drawing of lots

16 September 2025 1	Al-Hilal (Saudi Arabia)	2–1	(Qatar) Al-Duhail	Riyadh, Saudi Arabia
21:15 UTC+3	Núñez 57'; Hernández 67'	Report	Boulbina 37'; Aymen (yellow card) 71'; Luiz Júnior (yellow card) 90+3'	Stadium: Kingdom Arena; Attendance: 18,802; Referee: Shaun Evans (Australia)

29 September 2025 2	Nasaf (Uzbekistan)	2–3	(Saudi Arabia) Al-Hilal	Qarshi, Uzbekistan
18:45 UTC+5	Bakhromov 27'; Sidikov 60'	Report	Milinković-Savić 21'; Hernández 45+2'; Leonardo 79'; Neves (yellow card) 90+7'	Stadium: Markaziy Stadium; Attendance: 17,120; Referee: Ahmed Al-Ali (Kuwait)

21 October 2025 3	Al-Hilal (Saudi Arabia)	3–1	(Qatar) Al Sadd	Riyadh, Saudi Arabia
21:15 UTC+3	Akçiçek 25'; Koulibaly 40'; Milinkovic-Savic 81'; Núñez (yellow card) 87'	Report	Salman (yellow card) 45+3'; Camara (yellow card) 49'; Otávio (yellow card) 61'; Firmino 63'; Al-Yazidi (yellow card) 90+2'	Stadium: Kingdom Arena; Attendance: 25,083; Referee: Ilgiz Tantashev (Uzbekistan)

3 November 2025 4	Al-Gharafa (Qatar)	1–2	(Saudi Arabia) Al-Hilal	Al Rayyan, Qatar
21:15 UTC+3	Sano (yellow card) 62'; Al-Alwi 90+8'	Report	S. Al-Dawsari 9'; César 66'; Leonardo (yellow card) 79'	Stadium: Thani bin Jassim Stadium; Attendance: 7,429; Referee: Yusuke Araki (Japan)

25 November 2025 5	Al-Hilal (Saudi Arabia)	4–0	(Iraq) Al-Shorta	Riyadh, Saudi Arabia
21:15 UTC+3	Leonardo 44', 72'; Milinković-Savić 63'; João Cancelo 90+3'	Report		Stadium: Kingdom Arena; Attendance: 23,637; Referee: Qasim Al-Hatmi (Oman)

22 December 2025 6	Sharjah (United Arab Emirates)	0–1	(Saudi Arabia) Al-Hilal	Sharjah, United Arab Emirates
20:00 UTC+4		Report	Malcom 81'	Stadium: Sharjah Stadium; Attendance: 7,763; Referee: Salman Falahi (Qatar)

9 February 2026 7	Shabab Al Ahli (United Arab Emirates)	0–0	(Saudi Arabia) Al-Hilal	Dubai, United Arab Emirates
20:00 UTC+4		Report		Stadium: Rashid Stadium; Attendance: 2,855; Referee: Ilgiz Tantashev (Uzbekistan)

16 February 2026 8	Al-Hilal (Saudi Arabia)	2–1	(United Arab Emirates) Al Wahda	Riyadh, Saudi Arabia
21:15 UTC+3	Núñez 19', 77'	Report	B. Diarra 32'	Stadium: Kingdom Arena; Attendance: 10,070; Referee: Ma Ning (China)

==== Knockout stage ====
===== Round of 16 =====
13 April 2026 Round of 16	Al-Hilal (Saudi Arabia)	3–3 (a.e.t.) (2–4 p)	(Qatar) Al Sadd	Prince Abdullah Al-Faisal Sports City Stadium, Jeddah
21:00 UTC+3	Milinković-Savić 29'; S. Al-Dawsari 55'; Leonardo 67'	Report	Claudinho 36'; Mújica 58'; Firmino 70'	Attendance: 16,602; Referee: Shaun Evans (Australia)
	Penalties
	Neves (penalty scored); Leonardo (penalty scored); Benzema (penalty missed); Bouabré (penalty missed)		(penalty missed) Firmino; (penalty scored) Soria; (penalty scored) Claudinho; (penalty scored) Mújica; (penalty scored) Afif

== Statistics ==
=== Appearances ===
Last updated on 10 April 2026.

No.	Pos	Nat	Player	Total		Pro League		King's Cup		ACL Elite	
No.	Pos	Nat	Player	Apps	Goals	Apps	Goals	Apps	Goals	Apps	Goals
Goalkeepers
17	GK	(Saudi Arabia) KSA	Mohammed Al-Rubaie	10	0	8	0	0	0	2	0
25	GK	(France) FRA	Mathieu Patouillet	2	0	0	0	0	0	2	0
37	GK	(Morocco) MAR	Yassine Bounou	28	0	20	0	4	0	4	0
40	GK	(Saudi Arabia) KSA	Ahmed Abu Rasen	0	0	0	0	0	0	0	0
Defenders
3	DF	(Senegal) SEN	Kalidou Koulibaly	26	2	18	1	4	0	4	1
4	DF	(Turkey) TUR	Yusuf Akçiçek	17	1	4+4	0	2	0	7	1
5	DF	(Saudi Arabia) KSA	Ali Al-Bulaihi	7	0	1+2	0	2	0	2	0
19	DF	(France) FRA	Théo Hernandez	36	8	25	5	4	1	7	2
24	DF	(Saudi Arabia) KSA	Moteb Al-Harbi	31	2	24	2	3	0	4	0
30	DF	(Spain) ESP	Pablo Marí	7	0	4+1	0	0	0	2	0
31	DF	(Saudi Arabia) KSA	Rayan Al-Ghamdi	0	0	0	0	0	0	0	0
36	DF	(Saudi Arabia) KSA	Saud Haroun	0	0	0	0	0	0	0	0
44	DF	(Saudi Arabia) KSA	Saad Al-Mutairi	2	0	2	0	0	0	0	0
55	DF	(Saudi Arabia) KSA	Meshal Al-Dawood	2	0	2	0	0	0	0	0
78	DF	(Saudi Arabia) KSA	Ali Lajami	30	0	19	0	4	0	7	0
87	DF	(Saudi Arabia) KSA	Hassan Al-Tambakti	28	2	23	1	2	1	3	0
88	DF	(Saudi Arabia) KSA	Hamad Al-Yami	27	0	22	0	1	0	4	0
Midfielders
8	MF	(Portugal) POR	Rúben Neves	35	10	25	9	3	1	7	0
14	MF	(Saudi Arabia) KSA	Abdulkarim Darisi	21	0	12	0	4	0	5	0
16	MF	(Saudi Arabia) KSA	Nasser Al-Dawsari	29	0	21	0	2	0	6	0
18	MF	(Saudi Arabia) KSA	Murad Hawsawi	10	0	7	0	1	0	2	0
22	MF	(Serbia) SRB	Sergej Milinković-Savić	34	9	26	6	2	0	6	3
23	MF	(Saudi Arabia) KSA	Sultan Mandash	12	1	9	1	1	0	2	0
28	MF	(Saudi Arabia) KSA	Mohamed Kanno	36	5	26	5	4	0	6	0
29	MF	(Saudi Arabia) KSA	Salem Al-Dawsari	28	9	21	8	3	0	4	1
32	MF	(Saudi Arabia) KSA	Abdullah Al-Zaid	0	0	0	0	0	0	0	0
39	MF	(Saudi Arabia) KSA	Mohammed Al-Zaid	2	0	1	0	0+1	0	0	0
74	MF	(Saudi Arabia) KSA	Abdulaziz Hadhood	0	0	0	0	0	0	0	0
96	MF	(Saudi Arabia) KSA	Suhayb Al-Zaid	1	0	1	0	0	0	0	0
Forwards
7	FW	(Uruguay) URU	Darwin Núñez	24	9	16	6	1+1	0	6	3
9	FW	(Brazil) BRA	Marcos Leonardo	31	17	21	12	4	2	6	3
10	FW	(Brazil) BRA	Malcom	33	9	27	7	2	1	4	1
70	FW	(France) FRA	Saïmon Bouabré	8	0	5	0	1	0	2	0
75	FW	(France) FRA	Mohamed Kader Meïté	5	1	3	1	0	0	2	0
90	FW	(France) FRA	Karim Benzema	7	8	6	8	1	0	0	0
Players sent out on loan this season
11	MF	(Brazil) BRA	Kaio César	19	1	1+9	0	2+1	0	3+3	1
15	MF	(Saudi Arabia) KSA	Mohammed Al-Qahtani	6	0	0+3	0	0+1	0	0+2	0
20	DF	(Portugal) POR	João Cancelo	6	1	2	0	0	0	4	1
21	FW	(Saudi Arabia) KSA	Abdullah Radif	5	0	0+1	0	0+1	0	0+3	0
Player who made an appearance this season but have left the club
89	MF	(Saudi Arabia) KSA	Abdulellah Al-Malki	6	0	0+1	0	1	0	2+2	0
99	FW	(Saudi Arabia) KSA	Abdullah Al-Hamdan	15	1	0+10	0	2	1	3	0

=== Goalscorers ===
Rank	No.	Pos	Nat.	Player	Pro League	King's Cup	Champions League	Total
1	9	FW	(Brazil)	Marcos Leonardo	9	2	3	14
2	8	MF	(Portugal)	Rúben Neves	8	1	0	9
3	7	FW	(Uruguay)	Darwin Núñez	6	0	1	7
3	19	DF	(France)	Théo Hernandez	5	0	2	7
3	22	MF	(Serbia)	Sergej Milinković-Savić	4	0	3	7
6	10	FW	(Brazil)	Malcom	4	1	1	6
7	29	MF	(Saudi Arabia)	Salem Al-Dawsari	4	0	1	5
8	28	MF	(Saudi Arabia)	Mohamed Kanno	3	0	0	3
9	87	DF	(Saudi Arabia)	Hassan Al-Tambakti	1	1	0	2
10	3	DF	(Senegal)	Kalidou Koulibaly	0	0	1	1
10	4	DF	(Turkey)	Yusuf Akçiçek	0	0	1	1
10	11	MF	(Brazil)	Kaio César	0	0	1	1
10	20	DF	(Portugal)	João Cancelo	0	0	1	1
10	24	DF	(Saudi Arabia)	Moteb Al-Harbi	1	0	0	1
10	99	FW	(Saudi Arabia)	Abdullah Al-Hamdan	0	1	0	1
Own goals					2	0	0	2
Totals					47	6	15	68

Last updated: 29 January 2026

=== Assists ===
Rank	No.	Pos.	Nat.	Player	Pro League	King's Cup	Champions League	Total
1	8	MF	(Portugal)	Rúben Neves	5	0	1	6
2	7	FW	(Uruguay)	Darwin Núñez	4	0	1	5
2	10	FW	(Brazil)	Malcom	4	0	1	5
2	29	MF	(Saudi Arabia)	Salem Al-Dawsari	5	0	0	5
5	22	MF	(Serbia)	Sergej Milinković-Savić	3	0	1	4
6	3	DF	(Senegal)	Kalidou Koulibaly	2	0	1	3
7	11	MF	(Brazil)	Kaio César	2	0	0	2
7	20	DF	(Portugal)	João Cancelo	0	0	2	2
7	24	DF	(Saudi Arabia)	Moteb Al-Harbi	2	0	0	2
7	28	MF	(Saudi Arabia)	Mohamed Kanno	1	1	0	2
7	88	DF	(Saudi Arabia)	Hamad Al-Yami	1	0	1	2
12	5	DF	(Saudi Arabia)	Ali Al-Bulaihi	0	0	1	1
12	9	FW	(Brazil)	Marcos Leonardo	1	0	0	1
12	16	MF	(Saudi Arabia)	Nasser Al-Dawsari	0	0	1	1
12	19	DF	(France)	Théo Hernandez	0	1	0	1
Totals					30	2	10	42

Last updated: 25 January 2026

=== Clean sheets ===
Rank	No.	Pos.	Nat.	Player	Pro League	King's Cup	Champions League	Total
1	37	GK	(Morocco)	Yassine Bounou	10	2	0	12
2	17	GK	(Saudi Arabia)	Mohammed Al-Rubaie	2	0	1	3
3	25	GK	(France)	Mathieu Patouillet	0	0	2	2
Totals					12	2	3	17

Last updated: 10 April 2026
