= Gabri Veiga =

Spanish footballer (born 2002)

Personal information
- Full name: Gabriel Veiga Novas
- Date of birth: 27 May 2002 (age 24)
- Place of birth: O Porriño, Galicia, Spain
- Height: 1.84 m (6 ft 0 in)
- Position: Attacking midfielder

Team information
- Current team: Porto
- Number: 10

Youth career
- UD Louro Tameiga
- Santa Mariña
- Celta

Senior career*
Years	Team	Apps	(Gls)
2019–2021	Celta B	63	(10)
2021–2023	Celta	50	(11)
2023–2025	Al-Ahli	50	(11)
2025–	Porto	42	(8)

International career^{‡}
2019–2020	Spain U18	5	(2)
2022–	Spain U21	19	(3)
Medal record
Representing Spain
UEFA European Under-21 Championship
Runner-up	2023 Georgia–Romania
- * Club domestic league appearances and goals as of 23:22, 8 November 2026 (UTC) ‡ National team caps and goals as of 17:58, 8 May 2025 (UTC)

Gabriel Veiga Novas (Galician pronunciation: [ɡaβɾiˈɛl ˈvɛjɣɐ]; born 27 May 2002) is a Spanish professional footballer who plays as an attacking midfielder for Primeira Liga club Porto.

== Club career ==
=== Celta ===
Veiga was born in O Porriño, Pontevedra, Galicia, and was a RC Celta de Vigo youth graduate. He made his senior debut with the reserves at the age of 17 on 25 August 2019, starting in a 2–2 Segunda División B away draw against Internacional de Madrid.

Veiga scored his first goal on 1 December 2019, netting the opener in a 1–6 loss at CD Atlético Baleares. He made his first team – and La Liga – debut on 19 September of the following year, coming on as a late substitute for Renato Tapia in a 2–1 home win against Valencia CF.

Veiga scored his first professional goal on 10 September 2022, but in a 4–1 away loss against Atlético Madrid. The following 11 January, he was promoted to the main squad, being assigned the number 24 jersey.

=== Al-Ahli ===
Despite strong interest from top European clubs including Manchester City, Liverpool, Chelsea and Napoli, on 26 August 2023, Veiga joined Saudi Pro League side Al-Ahli, signing a three-year deal, after activating his €40m release clause. Veiga's decision to reject interest from European clubs in favour of the lucrative contract offer from Saudi Arabia drew criticism from fans, media and fellow players for a perceived lack of sporting ambition. Real Madrid midfielder Toni Kroos labelled the move as "embarrassing".

On 3 May 2025, Veiga was a member of Al-Ahli squad that won the AFC Champions League Elite for the first time in the club's history, defeating Kawasaki Frontale at the final with a score of 2–0.

=== Porto ===
On 5 June 2025, Veiga joined Primeira Liga club FC Porto for a fee of €15 million, signing a five-year contract with the Portuguese side.

He made his debut for the club, starting the match and played 67 minutes before being substituted, in the 0–0 draw in the 2025 FIFA Club World Cup against Palmeiras on 15 June.

== International career ==
Veiga is a Spain youth international. He was called up to Spain U21 for the 2023 UEFA European Under-21 Championship. He appeared as a substitute in all six matches of the tournament and later finished as runner-up after Spain 1–0 defeat to England U21 in the final.

== Career statistics ==
As of match played 20 November 2026

Appearances and goals by club, season and competition
Club	Season	League			National cup (Note: Includes Copa del Rey, King's Cup, Taça de Portugal)		League cup (Note: Includes Taça da Liga)		Continental		Other		Total	
Club	Season	Division	Apps	Goals	Apps	Goals	Apps	Goals	Apps	Goals	Apps	Goals	Apps	Goals
Celta B	2019–20	Segunda División B	14	1	—		—		—		—		14	1
Celta B	2020–21	Segunda División B	17	0	—		—		—		1 (Note: Appearance in Segunda División B play-offs)	0	18	0
Celta B	2021–22	Primera División RFEF	31	9	—		—		—		—		31	9
Celta B	2022–23	Primera Federación	1	0	—		—		—		—		1	0
Celta B	Total		63	10	—		—		—		1	0	64	10
Celta	2020–21	La Liga	6	0	0	0	—		—		—		6	0
Celta	2021–22	La Liga	7	0	3	0	—		—		—		10	0
Celta	2022–23	La Liga	36	11	3	0	—		—		—		39	11
Celta	2023–24	La Liga	1	0	0	0	—		—		—		1	0
Celta	Total		50	11	6	0	—		—		—		56	11
Al-Ahli	2023–24	Saudi Pro League	18	4	2	0	—		—		—		20	4
Al-Ahli	2024–25	Saudi Pro League	32	7	1	0	—		12 (Note: Appearances in AFC Champions League Elite)	1	1 (Note: Appearance in Saudi Super Cup)	0	46	8
Al-Ahli	Total		50	11	3	0	—		12	1	1	0	66	12
Porto	2024–25	Primeira Liga	—		—		—		—		3 (Note: Appearances in FIFA Club World Cup)	0	3	0
Porto	2025–26	Primeira Liga	31	3	6	0	1	1	10 (Note: Appearances in UEFA Europa League)	2	—		48	6
Porto	2026–27	Primeira Liga	11	5	1	0	0	0	4 (Note: Appearances UEFA Champions League)	2	1 (Note: Appearance in Supertaça Cândido de Oliveira)	0	17	7
Porto	Total		42	8	7	0	1	1	14	4	4	0	68	13
Career total			205	40	16	0	1	1	26	5	6	0	254	46

== Honours ==
Al-Ahli

- AFC Champions League Elite: 2024–25

Porto

- Primeira Liga: 2025–26
- Supertaça Cândido de Oliveira: 2026

Spain U21

- UEFA European Under-21 Championship runner-up: 2023

Individual

- La Liga Team of the Season: 2022–23
- La Liga Player of the Month: February 2023
- Primeira Liga Player of the Month: August 2026
