= Salem Al-Dawsari =

Saudi Arabian footballer (born 1991)

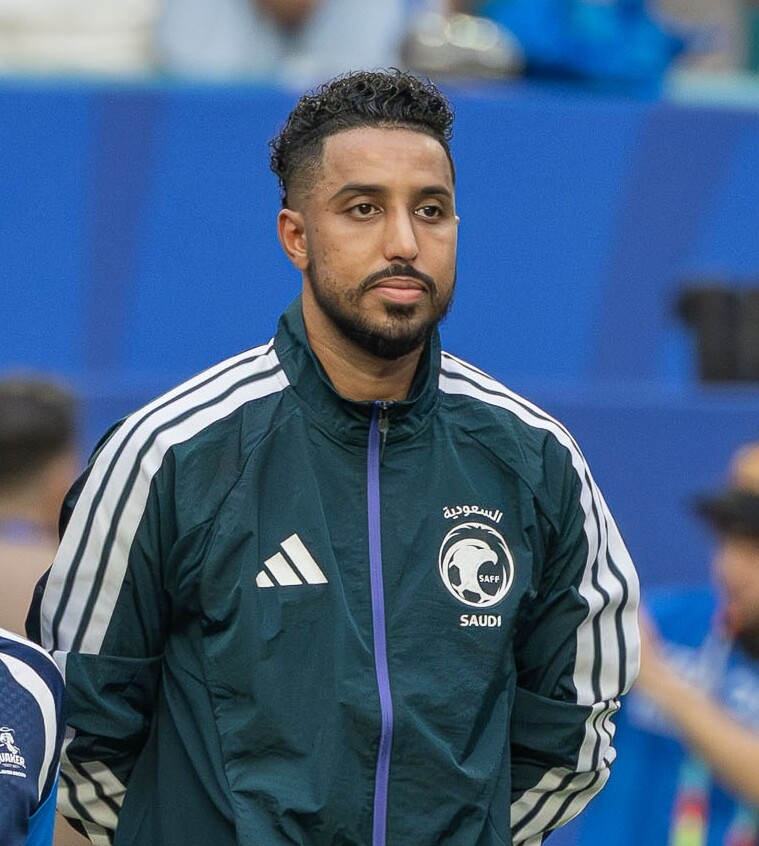
- Al-Dawsari with Saudi Arabia at the 2026 FIFA World Cup

Personal information
- Full name: Salem Mohammed Shafi Al-Dawsari
- Date of birth: 19 August 1991 (age 35)
- Place of birth: Jeddah, Saudi Arabia
- Height: 1.72 m (5 ft 8 in)
- Position: Left winger

Team information
- Current team: Al Hilal
- Number: 29

Youth career
- Al Hilal

Senior career*
Years	Team	Apps	(Gls)
2011–	Al Hilal	304	(88)
2018	→ Villarreal (loan)	1	(0)

International career^{‡}
2021	Saudi Arabia Olympic (O.P.)	5	(2)
2012–	Saudi Arabia	114	(27)
Medal record
Men's football
Representing Saudi Arabia
Gulf Cup
Runner-up	2014 Saudi Arabia
Runner-up	2019 Qatar
Bronze medal – third place	2024-25 Kuwait
Arab Cup
Third place	2025 Qatar
- * Club domestic league appearances and goals as of 22:08, 23 October 2026 (UTC) ‡ National team caps and goals as of 23:27, 26 June 2026 (UTC)

Salem Mohammed Shafi Al-Dawsari (Arabic: سَالِم مُحَمَّد شَافِي الدَّوْسَرِيّ; born 19 August 1991) is a Saudi Arabian professional footballer who plays as a left winger and captains both Saudi Pro League club Al-Hilal and the Saudi Arabia national team.

== Early and personal life ==
Al-Dawsari was born in Jeddah and joined Al Hilal at 19

== Club career ==
Al-Dawsari made his debut for Al Hilal in 2010, at the age of 19. Apart from one year on loan at Villarreal as part of a deal between the Saudi Arabian Football Federation and La Liga, he has spent his entire career at Al Hilal.

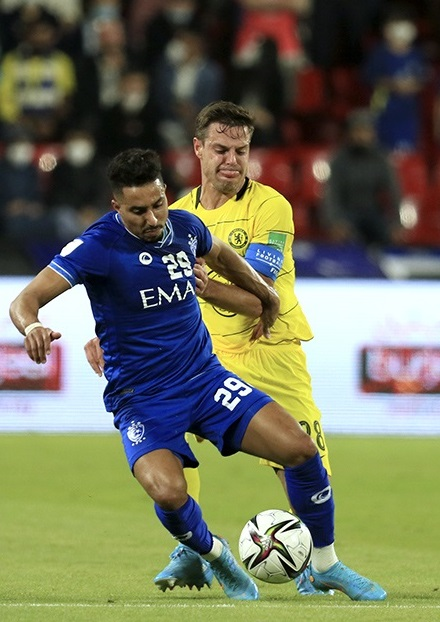
Al-Dawsari (left) and Chelsea's César Azpilicueta clashing during the 2021 FIFA Club World Cup

Al-Dawsari made one league appearance for Villarreal, coming on as a substitute against Real Madrid as the Yellow Submarine came from behind to draw 2–2.

In the second leg of the 2019 AFC Champions League final on 24 November, Al-Dawsari scored the opening goal in an eventual 2–0 away win over Urawa Red Diamonds, which saw Al-Hilal win the title following a 3–0 aggregate victory; the title allowed them to qualify for the 2019 FIFA Club World Cup.

On 7 February 2023, Al-Dawsari scored two penalties against Brazilian club Flamengo in the semi-finals of the 2022 FIFA Club World Cup. Al Hilal won 3–2, becoming the first Saudi Arabian club to reach the final of the Club World Cup.

On 27 June 2025, Al-Dawsari scored in a 2–0 win over Mexican club Pachuca in the final group stage match of the 2025 FIFA Club World Cup, becoming the top Asian goalscorer in the history of the Club World Cup with 5 goals, surpassing Tsukasa Shiotani (4). In October that year, he achieved his second AFC Player of the Year award, becoming the first Saudi player to achieve this feat.

== International career ==
Al-Dawsari was called up to the Saudi Arabia national team for the 2014 FIFA World Cup qualifiers, and scored his first international goal in an away match against Australia in 2014 In May 2018, he was named in Saudi Arabia's preliminary squad for the 2018 FIFA World Cup in Russia. On 25 June, Al-Dawsari scored a late winning goal as his side won 2–1 over Egypt in their last group stage match of the World Cup.

On 22 November 2022, Al-Dawsari scored his second goal at a FIFA World Cup, his first at the 2022 edition in Qatar in a match against Argentina. He made a run around the box before finishing past Emiliano Martínez to put Saudi Arabia ahead by a score of 2–1, which ended in a remarkable and historic victory for the Saudi Arabia national team. On 30 November, Al-Dawsari scored a goal against Mexico, in which he equalled the record of most goals scored by a Saudi player in World Cups, three goals by Sami Al-Jaber, as Saudi Arabia exited the World Cup with a 2–1 loss to Mexico.

On 8 October 2025, he made his 100th international appearance in a 3–2 win over Indonesia during the 2026 World Cup qualification fourth round. He was later named in the 26-man squad for the 2026 FIFA World Cup.

== Career statistics ==
=== Club ===
As of match played 19 October 2026

Appearances and goals by club, season and competition
Club	Season	League			King's Cup		Crown Prince Cup		Continental		Other		Total	
Club	Season	Division	Apps	Goals	Apps	Goals	Apps	Goals	Apps	Goals	Apps	Goals	Apps	Goals
Al Hilal	2011–12	Saudi Pro League	13	2	4	1	4	0	7	1	—		28	4
Al Hilal	2012–13	Saudi Pro League	18	3	1	0	2	0	8	2	—		29	5
Al Hilal	2013–14	Saudi Pro League	21	4	3	0	4	1	8	2	—		36	7
Al Hilal	2014–15	Saudi Pro League	18	3	2	1	3	0	10	0	—		33	4
Al Hilal	2015–16	Saudi Pro League	14	3	2	0	2	0	11	1	0	0	29	4
Al Hilal	2016–17	Saudi Pro League	17	2	4	2	2	0	5	1	1 (Note: Appearance(s) in Saudi Super Cup)	0	29	5
Al Hilal	2017–18	Saudi Pro League	13	4	0	0	—		6	0	—		19	4
Al Hilal	2018–19	Saudi Pro League	23	5	1	0	—		2	0	11 (Note: Nine appearances in Arab Club Champions Cup, one appearance in Saudi Super Cup, one appearance in Saudi-Egyptian Super Cup)	0	37	5
Al Hilal	2019–20	Saudi Pro League	20	4	3	1	—		12	3	3 (Note: Appearances in FIFA Club World Cup)	1	38	9
Al Hilal	2020–21	Saudi Pro League	24	8	1	0	—		2	0	1	0	28	8
Al Hilal	2021–22	Saudi Pro League	22	9	2	2	–		8	5	4 (Note: Three appearances and one goal in FIFA Club World Cup, one appearance and one goal in Saudi Super Cup)	2	36	18
Al Hilal	2022–23	Saudi Pro League	14	4	2	0	—		4	2	4 (Note: Three appearances and two goals in FIFA Club World Cup, one appearance in Saudi Super Cup)	2	24	8
Al Hilal	2023–24	Saudi Pro League	27	14	3	0	—		10	6	8 (Note: Six appearances and two goals in Arab Club Champions Cup, two appearances and two goals in Saudi Super Cup)	4	48	24
Al Hilal	2024–25	Saudi Pro League	32	15	2	1	—		12	10	5 (Note: Two appearances in Saudi Super Cup, three appearances and one goal in FIFA Club World Cup)	1	51	27
Al Hilal	2025–26	Saudi Pro League	26	8	4	0	—		5	2	—		35	10
Al Hilal	2026–27	Saudi Pro League	1	0	0	0	—		0	0	—		1	0
Al Hilal	Total		303	88	34	8	17	1	110	35	37	10	501	142
Villarreal (loan)	2017–18	La Liga	1	0	—		—		—		—		1	0
Career total			304	88	34	8	17	1	110	35	37	10	502	142

=== International ===
As of match played 26 June 2026

Appearances and goals by national team and year
National team	Year	Apps	Goals
Saudi Arabia	2012	2	1
Saudi Arabia	2013	7	0
Saudi Arabia	2014	9	1
Saudi Arabia	2015	4	0
Saudi Arabia	2016	0	0
Saudi Arabia	2017	5	2
Saudi Arabia	2018	14	3
Saudi Arabia	2019	9	4
Saudi Arabia	2020	1	1
Saudi Arabia	2021	8	4
Saudi Arabia	2022	13	3
Saudi Arabia	2023	6	3
Saudi Arabia	2024	16	2
Saudi Arabia	2025	13	2
Saudi Arabia	2026	7	1
Total		114	27

Saudi Arabia's score listed first, score column indicates score after each Al-Dawsari goal.

List of international goals scored by Salem Al-Dawsari
No.	Date	Venue	Opponent	Score	Result	Competition
1.	29 February 2012	Melbourne Rectangular Stadium, Melbourne, Australia	Australia	1–0	2–4	2014 FIFA World Cup qualification
2.	23 November 2014	King Fahd Stadium, Riyadh, Saudi Arabia	United Arab Emirates	3–2	3–2	2014 Arabian Gulf Cup
3.	8 June 2017	Adelaide Oval, Adelaide, Australia	Australia	1–1	2–3	2018 FIFA World Cup qualification
4.	7 October 2017	King Abdullah Sports City, Jeddah, Saudi Arabia	Jamaica	1–0	5–2	Friendly
5.	15 May 2018	La Cartuja, Seville, Spain	Greece	1–0	2–0	Friendly
6.	25 June 2018	Volgograd Arena, Volgograd, Russia	Egypt	2–1	2–1	2018 FIFA World Cup
7.	10 September 2018	Prince Faisal bin Fahd Stadium, Riyadh, Saudi Arabia	Bolivia	2–0	2–2	Friendly
8.	8 January 2019	Maktoum Bin Rashid Al Maktoum Stadium, Dubai, United Arab Emirates	North Korea	3–0	4–0	2019 AFC Asian Cup
9.	5 September 2019	Prince Mohamed bin Fahd Stadium, Dammam, Saudi Arabia	Mali	1–1	1–1	Friendly
10.	10 September 2019	Bahrain National Stadium, Riffa, Bahrain	Yemen	2–2	2–2	2022 FIFA World Cup qualification
11.	14 November 2019	Pakhtakor Stadium, Tashkent, Uzbekistan	Uzbekistan	3–2	3–2	2022 FIFA World Cup qualification
12.	14 November 2020	Prince Faisal bin Fahd Stadium, Riyadh, Saudi Arabia	Jamaica	1–0	3–0	Friendly
13.	30 March 2021	King Saud University Stadium, Riyadh, Saudi Arabia	Palestine	5–0	5–0	2022 FIFA World Cup qualification
14.	5 June 2021	King Saud University Stadium, Riyadh, Saudi Arabia	Yemen	1–0	3–0	2022 FIFA World Cup qualification
15.	11 June 2021	King Saud University Stadium, Riyadh, Saudi Arabia	Singapore	1–0	3–0	2022 FIFA World Cup qualification
16.	2 September 2021	King Saud University Stadium, Riyadh, Saudi Arabia	Vietnam	1–1	3–1	2022 FIFA World Cup qualification
17.	29 March 2022	King Abdullah Sports City, Jeddah, Saudi Arabia	Australia	1–0	1–0	2022 FIFA World Cup qualification
18.	22 November 2022	Lusail Iconic Stadium, Lusail, Qatar	Argentina	2–1	2–1	2022 FIFA World Cup
19.	30 November 2022	Lusail Iconic Stadium, Lusail, Qatar	Mexico	1–2	1–2	2022 FIFA World Cup
20.	24 March 2023	Prince Abdullah Al-Faisal Stadium, Jeddah, Saudi Arabia	Venezuela	1–2	1–2	Friendly
21.	28 March 2023	Prince Abdullah Al-Faisal Stadium, Jeddah, Saudi Arabia	Bolivia	1–1	1–2	Friendly
22.	17 October 2023	Estádio Municipal de Portimão, Portimão, Portugal	Mali	1–2	1–3	Friendly
23.	21 March 2024	King Saud University Stadium, Riyadh, Saudi Arabia	Tajikistan	1–0	1–0	2026 FIFA World Cup qualification
24.	28 December 2024	Jaber Al-Ahmad International Stadium, Kuwait City, Kuwait	Iraq	1–0	3–1	26th Arabian Gulf Cup
25.	20 March 2025	King Saud University Stadium, Riyadh, Saudi Arabia	China	1–0	1–0	2026 FIFA World Cup qualification
26.	5 December 2025	Al Bayt Stadium, Al Khor, Qatar	Comoros	3–1	3–1	2025 FIFA Arab Cup
27.	5 June 2026	Q2 Stadium, Austin, United States	Puerto Rico	3–0	3–0	Friendly

== Honours ==
Al-Hilal

- Saudi Pro League: 2016–17, 2017–18, 2019–20, 2020–21, 2021–22, 2023–24
- King's Cup: 2015, 2017, 2019–20, 2022–23, 2023–24, 2025–26
- Saudi Crown Prince Cup: 2011–12, 2012–13, 2015–16
- Saudi Super Cup: 2018, 2021, 2023, 2024
- AFC Champions League: 2019, 2021

Individual

- IFFHS Asian Men's Team of the Year: 2020, 2022, 2023, 2025
- IFFHS Asian Men's Team of the Decade: 2020
- AFC Champions League Most Valuable Player: 2021
- Saudi Pro League Player of the Month: January 2023
- Saudi Pro League Saudi Player of the Season: 2024–25
- AFC Player of the Year: 2022, 2025
- AFC Champions League Elite top scorer: 2024–25

== See also ==
- List of men's footballers with 100 or more international caps
