= Mohammed Sulaiman (footballer) =

Saudi Arabian association football player

Personal information
- Full name: Mohammed bin Sulaiman bin Mohammed Bakor
- Date of birth: 8 April 2004 (age 22)
- Place of birth: Jeddah, Saudi Arabia
- Height: 1.80 m (5 ft 11 in)
- Position: Defender

Team information
- Current team: Al-Ahli
- Number: 5

Youth career
- Al-Ahli

Senior career*
Years	Team	Apps	(Gls)
2024–	Al-Ahli	45	(2)

International career^{‡}
2022–2024	Saudi Arabia U20		
2024–	Saudi Arabia U23	4	(0)
2025–	Saudi Arabia	5	(0)
- * Club domestic league appearances and goals as of 21:30, 30 October 2026 (UTC) ‡ National team caps and goals as of 20:48, 8 December 2025 (UTC)

Mohammed bin Sulaiman bin Mohammed Bakor (Arabic: محمد سليمان بكر; born 8 April 2004) is a Saudi Arabian football player who plays as a defender for Al-Ahli and the Saudi Arabia national team.

== Career ==
Mohammed Sulaiman began his career at Al-Ahli. On 4 November 2025, Sulaiman made his debut for the club in the AFC Champions League Elite league stage match against Iraqi side Al-Shorta. He came off the bench in the 87th minute, replacing Roger Ibañez in a 5–1 home win. He made his league debut on 22 November 2024 in a 1–0 away win against Al-Fayha as a stoppage time substitute. On 15 January 2025, Sulaiman made his first start for the club in a 1–0 away defeat to Al-Kholood. On 30 January 2025, Mohammed Sulaiman renewed his contract with Al-Ahli until 2028. On 25 February 2025, he scored his first goal for the club in a 4–1 win against Al-Qadsiah.

== Honours ==
Al-Ahli

- Saudi Super Cup: 2025
- AFC Champions League Elite: 2024–25
