= Abdulkarim Darisi =

Saudi Arabian footballer (born 2003)

Personal information
- Full name: Abdulkarim Mohammed Ismail Darisi
- Date of birth: 18 April 2003 (age 23)
- Place of birth: Riyadh, Saudi Arabia
- Height: 1.84 m (6 ft 0 in)
- Position: Winger

Team information
- Current team: Abha (on loan from Al-Hilal)
- Number: 17

Youth career
- –2023: Al-Ahli

Senior career*
Years	Team	Apps	(Gls)
2023–2025	Al-Ahli	18	(1)
2025–	Al-Hilal	17	(0)
2026–	→ Abha (loan)	0	(0)

International career
2024–2025	Saudi Arabia U23	7	(0)
- * Club domestic league appearances and goals as of 21 May 2026

Abdulkarim Darisi (Arabic: عبد الكريم دارسي; born 18 April 2003) is a Saudi Arabian professional football player who plays as a winger for Abha, on loan from Al-Hilal.

== Club career ==
Darisi started his career at the youth academy of Al-Ahli. he reached the first team in the 2023–2024 season. On 28 May 2025, Darisi joined Al-Hilal for five-years deal.

== International career ==
He was called up to the Saudi Arabia U23 to participate in 2024 Maurice Revello Tournament.
