= 2026–27 Fulham F.C. season =

129th season in existence of Fulham FC

Fulham
2026–27 season
- Owner: Shahid Khan
- Chairman: Shahid Khan
- Head coach: Álvaro Arbeloa
- Stadium: Craven Cottage
- Premier League: 15th
- FA Cup: Third round
- EFL Cup: Fourth round
Home colours	Away colours	Third colours

The 2026–27 season is the 129th season in the history of Fulham Football Club, and the club's fifth consecutive season in the Premier League. In addition to the domestic league, the club is also participating in the FA Cup and the EFL Cup.

== Managerial changes ==
Prior to the season starting, Marco Silva left the club as head coach after five years in charge. He was shortly replaced by Álvaro Arbeloa, who agreed a three-year contract.

== Transfers and contracts ==
=== In ===
Date	Pos.	Player	From	Fee	Ref.
First team
27 June 2026	CF	(Sweden) Jonah Kusi-Asare	(Germany) Bayern Munich	£5,200,000	
3 August 2026	CF	(Spain) Gonzalo García	(Spain) Real Madrid	£34,200,000	
3 August 2026	CAM	(Spain) César Palacios	(Spain) Real Madrid	£8,560,000	
11 August 2026	CDM	(Northern Ireland) Shea Charles	(England) Southampton	£26,000,000 (Note: Rising to £30,000,000 with add-ons.)	
1 September 2026	CB	(Austria) David Affengruber	(Spain) Elche	£8,500,000	
1 September 2026	CM	(Spain) Manuel Ángel	(Spain) Real Madrid	£3,000,000	
Academy
13 August 2026	CAM	(Turks and Caicos Islands) Maddox Zaidan-Jones	(Turks and Caicos Islands) AFC Academy	Free	
21 August 2026	CF	(Scotland) Erskine Rennie	(Scotland) Celtic	Undisclosed	
4 September 2026	RB	(England) Marley Clarke	(England) Watford	Free transfer	
7 September 2026	LW	(Wales) Jose Sani	(England) Berkhamsted	Free	

=== Out ===
Date	Pos.	Player	To	Fee	Ref.
First team
22 July 2026	CB	(Morocco) Issa Diop	(England) Ipswich Town	£8,500,000	
8 August 2026	DM	(Serbia) Saša Lukić	(England) Ipswich Town	£9,000,000	
Academy
22 July 2026	CB	(England) Harvey Araujo	(England) Burton Albion	Undisclosed	

=== Loaned in ===
Date	Pos.	Player	From	Loaned until	Ref.
First team
1 September 2026	CM	(Sweden) Hugo Larsson	(Germany) Eintracht Frankfurt	End of season (Note: Option to make the move permanent.)	
Academy

=== Loaned out ===
Date	Pos.	Player	To	Loaned until	Ref.
First team
5 September 2026	CB	(Canada) Luc de Fougerolles	(United States) Real Salt Lake	End of season	
Academy
20 July 2026	GK	(England) Alfie McNally	(England) York City	End of season	
31 July 2026	RW	(Scotland) Brodie Dair	(Scotland) Queen of the South	End of season	
7 August 2026	LW	(Bangladesh) Farhaan Ali Wahid	(England) Boreham Wood	End of season	
11 August 2026	GK	(Bosnia and Herzegovina) Dino Kaiser	(England) Uxbridge	End of season	
14 August 2026	CF	(England) Aaron Loupalo-Bi	(England) Fleetwood Town	End of season	
21 August 2026	CAM	(Wales) Luke Harris	(England) Wigan Athletic	End of season	
22 August 2026	GK	(England) Marco Underwood	(England) Hampton & Richmond Borough	19 September 2026	
26 August 2026	CM	(New Zealand) Matt Dibley-Dias	(Wales) Newport County	2 January 2027	
30 August 2026	CB	(England) Samuel Amissah	(Portugal) Estoril Praia	End of season	
7 October 2026	GK	(England) Matthew Bagot	(England) Corinthian-Casuals	3 January 2026	

=== Released / Out of contract ===
Date	Pos.	Player	Subsequent club	Joined date	Ref.
First team
30 June 2026	CF	(Mexico) Raúl Jiménez	(England) Wolverhampton Wanderers	1 July 2026	
30 June 2026	RW	(Wales) Harry Wilson	(England) Leeds United	8 July 2026	
30 June 2026	GK	(Germany) Steven Benda	(England) Nottingham Forest	15 August 2026	
Academy
30 June 2026	CF	(England) Olly Sanderson	(England) Stevenage	1 July 2026	
30 June 2026	GK	(England) Oliver Mayer	(England) Brighton & Hove Albion	4 July 2026	
30 June 2026	LB	(England) Callum Cliff	(England) Reading	9 July 2026	
30 June 2026	LB	(England) Jonathan Esenga	(Sweden) IF Elfsborg	12 August 2026	
30 June 2026	CB	(England) Charlie Robinson	Retired		
30 June 2026	RB	(Portugal) Brad de Jesus			
30 June 2026	CM	(England) Oliver Gofford			
30 June 2026	LB	(England) Marcell Hall			
30 June 2026	CM	(Scotland) Ruban Khan			
30 June 2026	LW	(England) Harley Platel			
30 June 2026	LB	(England) Quinn Schutter			
30 June 2026	RB	(Colombia) Devan Tanton			
30 June 2026	RB	(England) Joe Walters			
30 June 2026	CF	(England) Tom Wingate			

=== New contracts ===
Date	Pos.	Player	Contracted until	Ref.
First team
14 September 2026	GK	(France) Benjamin Lecomte	30 June 2028	
Academy
13 July 2026	RW	(Cameroon) Macaulay Zepa	Undisclosed (Note: First professional contract.)	
21 July 2026	CB	(England) Samuel Amissah	30 June 2029 (Note: Club option to extend by a further year.)	
13 August 2026	GK	(England) Michael Allen	30 June 2027	
13 August 2026	RW	(Republic of Ireland) Tom Olyott	30 June 2027	
28 August 2026	CM	(Grenada) Jayden Quashie	30 June 2029	
31 August 2026	CM	(England) Chibuzo Nwoko	30 June 2028	

== Pre-season and friendlies ==
On 11 July, Fulham announced a home pre-season friendly against Bundesliga side VfB Stuttgart. Four days later, a friendly against Saudi Pro League side Al-Ahli was confirmed. A fortnight later, the club announced further friendlies against Norwich City, Farense and Crystal Palace. On 29 July, Fulham announced their participation in the 36th edition of the Trofeo Costa del Sol against local newly promoted La Liga side Málaga.

Win Draw Loss Fixtures

25 July 2026 Friendly	Fulham	0–2	Norwich City	New Malden
13:00 BST		Report	Ben Slimane 20'; Darling 61'	Stadium: Motspur Park Training Ground; Attendance: 0 (Behind closed doors)

28 July 2026 Friendly	Al-Ahli	1–1	Fulham	Albufeira, Portugal
18:00 WEST	Mathias 21'	Report	Sessegnon 40'	Stadium: Estádio Municipal

1 August 2026 Friendly	Farense	1–2	Fulham	Faro, Portugal
10:00 WEST	Trialist 10'	Report	Iwobi 52' (pen.); Muniz 89'	Stadium: Estádio de São Luís; Attendance: 0 (Behind closed doors)

7 August 2026 Friendly	Fulham	1–2	Crystal Palace	New Malden
18:00 BST	Robinson 3'	Report	Sarr 33'; França 47'	Stadium: Motspur Park Training Ground; Attendance: 0 (Behind closed doors)

12 August 2026 Trofeo Costa del Sol	Málaga	2–2	Fulham	Málaga, Spain
21:00 CEST	Chupete 28'; Jauregi 90+1' (pen.)	Report	Sessegnon 24'; Iwobi 57'	Stadium: La Rosaleda; Attendance: 17,179; Referee: Miguel Ángel Ortiz Arias

15 August 2026 Friendly	Fulham	1–0	VfB Stuttgart	Fulham
16:00 BST	Castagne 67'	Report		Stadium: Craven Cottage

== Competitions ==
=== Overall record ===
Competition	First match	Last match	Starting round	Final position	Record							
Competition	First match	Last match	Starting round	Final position	Pld	W	D	L	GF	GA	GD	Win %
Premier League	24 August 2026	30 May 2027	Matchday 1	TBD	10	2	4	4	10	12	−2	20.00
FA Cup	January 2027	TBD	Third round	TBD	0	0	0	0	0	0	+0	—
EFL Cup	27 August 2026	28 October 2026	Second round	Fourth round	3	2	0	1	6	3	+3	66.67
Total					13	4	4	5	16	15	+1	30.77

Last updated: 7 November 2026
Source: Soccerway

=== Premier League ===
==== League table ====
Pos	Team	Pld	W	D	L	GF	GA	GD	Pts
12	Newcastle United	10	3	3	4	13	16	−3	12
13	Hull City	10	2	5	3	11	11	0	11
14	Fulham	11	2	5	4	11	13	−2	11
15	Ipswich Town	10	3	2	5	15	20	−5	11
16	Nottingham Forest	10	2	3	5	9	13	−4	9

Updated to match(es) played on 21 November 2026. Source: Premier League
Rules for classification: 1) Points; 2) Goal difference; 3) Goals scored; 4) If the champions, relegated teams or qualified teams for UEFA competitions cannot be determined by rules 1 to 3 following the completion of the competition, rules 4.1 to 4.3 are applied between such teams – 4.1) Head-to-head points; 4.2) Head-to-head away goals; 4.3) Play-off at a neutral site.

==== Results summary ====
Overall								Home						Away					
Pld	W	D	L	GF	GA	GD	Pts	W	D	L	GF	GA	GD	W	D	L	GF	GA	GD
11	2	5	4	11	13	−2	11	1	2	2	7	8	−1	1	3	2	4	5	−1

Last updated: 21 November 2026.
Source: Soccerway

==== Results by round ====
Round	1	2	3	4	5	6	7	8	9	10	11	12	13	14	15	16	17	18	19	20	21	22	23
Ground	H	A	H	A	H	A	H	A	A	H	A	H	A	A	H	A	H	H	A	H	A	H	A
Result	L	L	L	D	D	L	W	W	D	D	D												
Position	12	16	19	18	19	20	18	15	15	15													
Points	0	0	0	1	2	2	5	6	7	8	9												

Updated to match(es) played on 21 November 2026. Source: Premier League
A = Away; H = Home; W = Win; D = Draw; L = Loss; P = Postponed

==== Matches ====
Win Draw Loss Fixtures

24 August 2026 1	Fulham	2–3	Chelsea	Fulham
20:00 BST	King 23'; García 54'; Bassey (yellow card) 76'; Castagne (yellow card) 88'	Report	João Pedro 1'; Colwill (yellow card) 5'; Lavia (yellow card) 12'; Rogers 41'; Palmer 49'; James (yellow card) 75'	Stadium: Craven Cottage; Attendance: 27,461; Referee: John Brooks

30 August 2026 2	Sunderland	1–0	Fulham	Sunderland
14:00 BST	Isidor 75'	Report	Andersen (yellow card) 35'; Palacios (yellow card) 59'	Stadium: Stadium of Light; Attendance: 46,781; Referee: Michael Salisbury
Note: Fixture was initially scheduled for 29 August, but was rescheduled for live Sky Sports broadcasting.

5 September 2026 3	Fulham	2–3	Crystal Palace	Fulham
15:00 BST	King 11'; Palacios 42'	Report	Mitchell 35', 54'; Chilwell 77'	Stadium: Craven Cottage; Attendance: 27,014; Referee: Sam Barrott

12 September 2026 4	Liverpool	0–0	Fulham	Liverpool
15:00 BST		Report	Tete (yellow card) 81'	Stadium: Anfield; Attendance: 60,160; Referee: Thomas Bramall

20 September 2026 5	Fulham	1–1	Manchester United	Fulham
16:30 BST	King (yellow card) 45'; Castagne (yellow card) 50'; Martínez 63' (o.g.); Muniz (yellow card) 85'	Report	Cunha 89'	Stadium: Craven Cottage; Attendance: 27,563; Referee: Peter Bankes
Note: Fixture was initially scheduled for 19 September, but was rescheduled for live Sky Sports broadcasting.

10 October 2026 6	Ipswich Town	2–1	Fulham	Ipswich
15:00 BST	Davis (yellow card) 19'; Ouattara 88'; O'Shea 90+2'; Walton (yellow card) 90+7'	Report	King (yellow card) 44'; Bassey (yellow card) 51'; Sessegnon 55'; Ángel (yellow card) 84'; Smith Rowe (yellow card) 90+4'	Stadium: Portman Road; Attendance: 29,445; Referee: Lewis Smith

17 October 2026 7	Fulham	1–0	Hull City	Fulham
15:00 BST	King (yellow card) 27'; Iwobi 33'; Berge (yellow card) 84'; Sessegnon (red card) 90+4'	Report	Herrington (yellow card) 22'; Slater (yellow card) 27'	Stadium: Craven Cottage; Attendance: 27,531; Referee: Chris Kavanagh

24 October 2026 8	Coventry City	0–1	Fulham	Coventry
15:00 BST		Report	Charles (yellow card) 36'; Bobb 80'; Robinson (yellow card) 82'	Stadium: Coventry Building Society Arena; Attendance: 31,449; Referee: Adam Herczeg

31 October 2026 9	Aston Villa	1–1	Fulham	Birmingham
20:00 GMT	McGinn (penalty missed) 16'; Jackson 39'; Cash (yellow card) 76'	Report	Affengruber (yellow card) 30'; Bassey (yellow card) 45+4'; Suzuki 64' (o.g.); Cairney (yellow card) 77'	Stadium: Villa Park; Attendance: 34,649; Referee: Sam Barrott
Note: Fixture was initially scheduled for 31 October, but was moved for live Sky Sports broadcast. It was then reverted to the Saturday for an 20:00 kick-off due to Aston Villa's involvement in the UEFA Champions League on the following Tuesday.

7 November 2026 10	Fulham	1–1	Newcastle United	Fulham
15:00 GMT	Muniz 83'	Report	Murphy 80'; Schär (yellow card) 90'; Dedić (yellow card) 90+2'	Stadium: Craven Cottage; Attendance: 27,367; Referee: Robert Jones

21 November 2026 11	Manchester City	1–1	Fulham	Manchester
12:30 GMT	Anderson 57'; Donnarumma (yellow card) 76'	Report	Iwobi (yellow card) 7'; Muniz 16'; Bassey (yellow card) 22'; Charles (yellow card) 44'	Stadium: Etihad Stadium; Referee: Thomas Bramall
Note: Fixture was initially scheduled for a 15:00 kick-off, but was brought forward for live TNT Sports broadcasting.

29 November 2026 12	Fulham	v	Bournemouth	Fulham
14:05 GMT				Stadium: Craven Cottage
Note: Fixture was initially scheduled for 28 November, but was pushed back a day for live Sky Sports broadcasting.

3 December 2026 13	Tottenham Hotspur	v	Fulham	Tottenham
20:00 GMT				Stadium: Tottenham Hotspur Stadium
Note: Fixture was initially scheduled for 2 December, but was pushed back a day for live Sky Sports broadcasting.

6 December 2026 14	Everton	v	Fulham	Liverpool
14:00 GMT				Stadium: Hill Dickinson Stadium
Note: Fixture was initially scheduled for 5 December, but was pushed back a day for live Sky Sports broadcasting.

12 December 2026 15	Fulham	v	Brentford	Fulham
15:00 GMT				Stadium: Craven Cottage

19 December 2026 16	Leeds United	v	Fulham	Leeds
15:00 GMT				Stadium: Elland Road

26 December 2026 17	Fulham	v	Brighton & Hove Albion	Fulham
15:00 GMT				Stadium: Craven Cottage

30 December 2026 18	Fulham	v	Arsenal	Fulham
15:00 GMT				Stadium: Craven Cottage
Note: Fixture was initially scheduled for a 15:00 kick-off, but was pushed back for live Sky Sports broadcasting.

2 January 2027 19	Nottingham Forest	v	Fulham	West Bridgford
15:00 GMT				Stadium: City Ground

6 January 2027 20	Fulham	v	Tottenham Hotspur	Fulham
19:30 GMT				Stadium: Craven Cottage
Note: Fixture was initially scheduled for a 15:00 kick-off, but was pushed back for live Sky Sports broadcasting.

16 January 2026 21	Newcastle United	v	Fulham	Newcastle upon Tyne
15:00 GMT				Stadium: St James' Park

23 January 2027 22	Fulham	v	Aston Villa	Fulham
15:00 GMT				Stadium: Craven Cottage

31 January 2027 23	AFC Bournemouth	v	Fulham	King's Park
14:00 GMT				Stadium: Vitality Stadium
Note: Fixture was initially scheduled for 30 January, but was pushed back due to Bournemouth in UEFA Europa League participation on the preceding Thursday.

=== FA Cup ===
Win Draw Loss Fixtures

=== EFL Cup ===
Fulham entered the EFL Cup in the second round, and were drawn at home to AFC Wimbledon. They were then drawn away to West Ham United in the third round, and at home to Crystal Palace in the fourth round.

Win Draw Loss Fixtures

27 August 2026 Second round	Fulham	3–0	AFC Wimbledon	Fulham
20:00 BST	Smith Rowe 37'; Muniz 42'; Tete (yellow card) 48'; García 90+3'	Report	Nelson (yellow card) 82'	Stadium: Craven Cottage; Attendance: 17,714; Referee: Anthony Backhouse

15 September 2026 Third round	West Ham United	2–3	Fulham	Stratford
19:45 BST	Morato 16'; Pablo 45+2'	Report	Muniz 13'; Palacios 37'; Smith Rowe (yellow card) 68'; Bobb 78'	Stadium: London Stadium; Attendance: 41,808; Referee: Gavin Ward

28 October 2026 Fourth round	Fulham	0–1	Crystal Palace	Fulham
19:45 GMT	Berge (yellow card) 19'	Report	Nketiah 37'; Lerma (yellow card) 50'; Guessand (yellow card) 63'	Stadium: Craven Cottage; Attendance: 22,420; Referee: Simon Hooper

== Statistics ==
=== Appearances and goals ===
As of match played 7 November 2026

Players with no appearances are not included on the list; italics indicate a loaned in player.

No.	Pos	Nat	Player	Total		Premier League		FA Cup		EFL Cup	
No.	Pos	Nat	Player	Apps	Goals	Apps	Goals	Apps	Goals	Apps	Goals
1	GK	(Germany) GER	Bernd Leno	10	0	10+0	0	0+0	0	0	0
2	DF	(Netherlands) NED	Kenny Tete	7	0	1+4	0	0+0	0	2	0
3	DF	(Nigeria) NGR	Calvin Bassey	12	0	10+0	0	0+0	0	1+1	0
4	DF	(Spain) ESP	Jorge Cuenca	2	0	1+0	0	0+0	0	1	0
5	DF	(Denmark) DEN	Joachim Andersen	6	0	2+1	0	0+0	0	3	0
6	MF	(England) ENG	Harrison Reed	2	0	0+0	0	0+0	0	2	0
7	FW	(Spain) ESP	Gonzalo García	13	2	10+0	1	0+0	0	0+3	1
8	MF	(Spain) ESP	César Palacios	11	2	3+5	1	0+0	0	2+1	1
9	FW	(Brazil) BRA	Rodrigo Muniz	11	3	0+8	1	0+0	0	3	2
10	MF	(Scotland) SCO	Tom Cairney	4	0	0+3	0	0+0	0	0+1	0
11	FW	(Brazil) BRA	Kevin	8	0	0+5	0	0+0	0	2+1	0
14	FW	(Norway) NOR	Oscar Bobb	13	2	10+0	1	0+0	0	2+1	1
15	MF	(Sweden) SWE	Hugo Larsson	8	0	1+5	0	0+0	0	2	0
16	MF	(Norway) NOR	Sander Berge	11	0	8+2	0	0+0	0	1	0
17	FW	(Nigeria) NGR	Alex Iwobi	11	1	10+0	1	0+0	0	1	0
19	MF	(Northern Ireland) NIR	Shea Charles	12	0	8+2	0	0+0	0	1+1	0
20	MF	(Spain) ESP	Manuel Ángel	2	0	0+1	0	0+0	0	0+1	0
21	DF	(Belgium) BEL	Timothy Castagne	11	0	9+0	0	0+0	0	1+1	0
22	DF	(Austria) AUT	David Affengruber	7	0	7+0	0	0+0	0	0	0
23	GK	(France) FRA	Benjamin Lecomte	3	0	0+0	0	0+0	0	3	0
24	MF	(England) ENG	Josh King	12	2	10+0	2	0+0	0	0+2	0
30	DF	(England) ENG	Ryan Sessegnon	7	1	1+5	1	0+0	0	1	0
32	MF	(England) ENG	Emile Smith Rowe	6	1	0+4	0	0+0	0	2	1
33	DF	(United States) USA	Antonee Robinson	11	0	9+0	0	0+0	0	2	0
34	MF	(England) ENG	Chibuzo Nwoko	1	0	0+0	0	0+0	0	0+1	0
35	FW	(Cameroon) CMR	Macauley Zepa	1	0	0+0	0	0+0	0	0+1	0
Player who featured but departed the club on loan during the season:
44	DF	(Canada) CAN	Luc de Fougerolles	1	0	0	0	0	0	1	0

=== Disciplinary record ===
As of match played 7 November 2026

Rank	No.	Pos.	Player	Premier League			FA Cup			EFL Cup			Total		
Rank	No.	Pos.	Player	Yellow card	(yellow card) (yellow-red card)	Red card	Yellow card	(yellow card) (yellow-red card)	Red card	Yellow card	(yellow card) (yellow-red card)	Red card	Yellow card	(yellow card) (yellow-red card)	Red card
1	30	LB	(England) Ryan Sessegnon	0	0	1	0	0	0	0	0	0	0	0	1
2	3	CB	(Nigeria) Calvin Bassey	3	0	0	0	0	0	0	0	0	3	0	0
2	24	CAM	(England) Josh King	3	0	0	0	0	0	0	0	0	3	0	0
4	2	RB	(Netherlands) Kenny Tete	1	0	0	0	0	0	1	0	0	2	0	0
4	16	CDM	(Norway) Sander Berge	1	0	0	0	0	0	1	0	0	2	0	0
4	21	RB	(Belgium) Timothy Castagne	2	0	0	0	0	0	0	0	0	2	0	0
4	32	CAM	(England) Emile Smith Rowe	1	0	0	0	0	0	1	0	0	2	0	0
8	5	CB	(Denmark) Joachim Andersen	1	0	0	0	0	0	0	0	0	1	0	0
8	8	CAM	(Spain) César Palacios	1	0	0	0	0	0	0	0	0	1	0	0
8	9	CF	(Brazil) Rodrigo Muniz	1	0	0	0	0	0	0	0	0	1	0	0
8	10	CM	(Scotland) Tom Cairney	1	0	0	0	0	0	0	0	0	1	0	0
8	19	CDM	(Northern Ireland) Shea Charles	1	0	0	0	0	0	0	0	0	1	0	0
8	20	CM	(Spain) Manuel Angel	1	0	0	0	0	0	0	0	0	1	0	0
8	22	CB	(Austria) David Affengruber	1	0	0	0	0	0	0	0	0	1	0	0
8	33	LB	(United States) Antonee Robinson	1	0	0	0	0	0	0	0	0	1	0	0
Totals				19	0	1	0	0	0	3	0	0	22	0	1

== Awards ==
=== Player awards ===
==== Premier League Save of the Month ====
Month	Player	Opposition	Result	Ref.
September	(Germany) Bernd Leno	v. Manchester United	Nominated	
