= Kenny Tete =

Dutch footballer (born 1995)

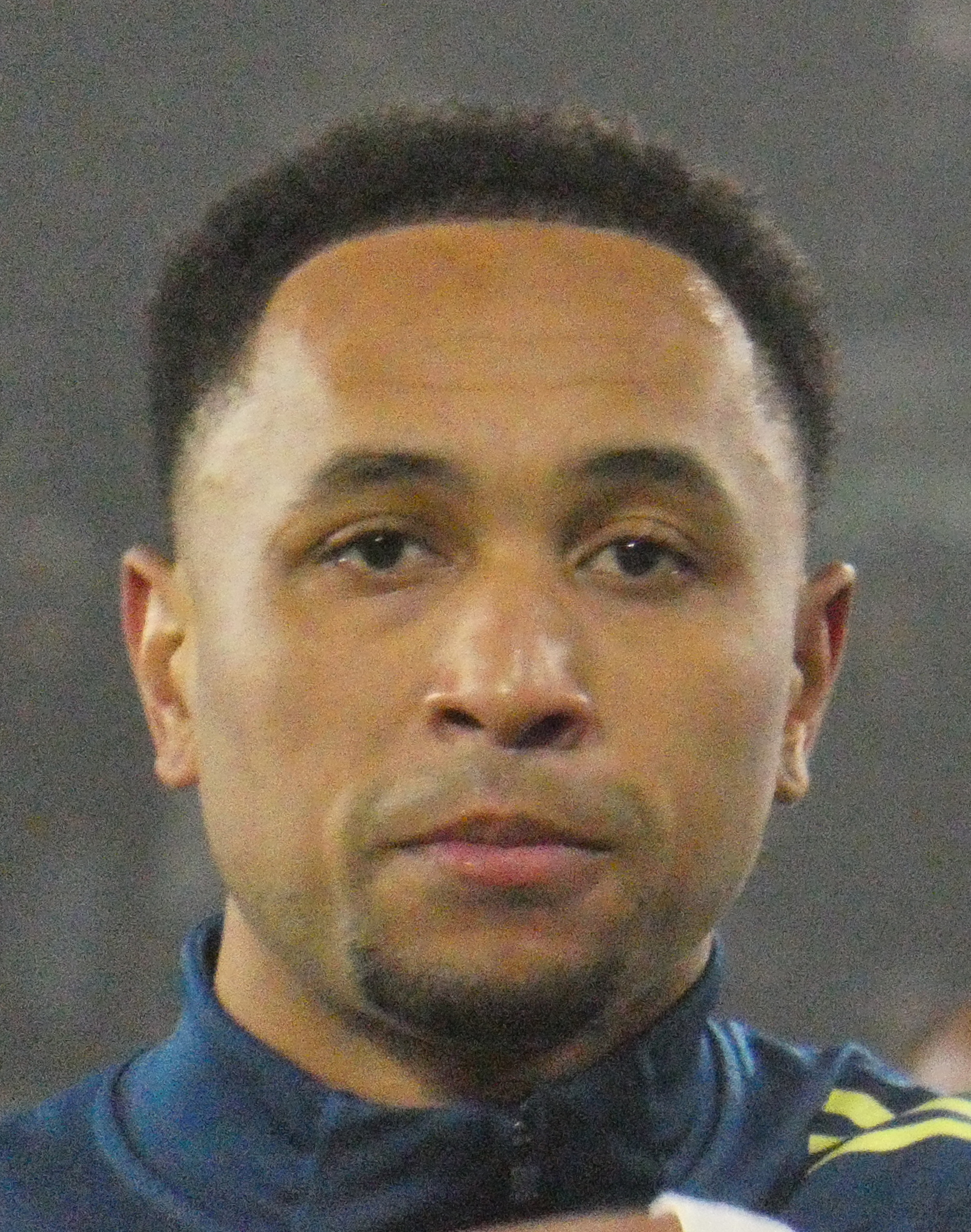
- Tete with Fulham in 2026

Personal information
- Full name: Kenny Joelle Tete
- Date of birth: 9 October 1995 (age 31)
- Place of birth: Amsterdam, Netherlands
- Height: 1.80 m (5 ft 11 in)
- Position: Right-back

Team information
- Current team: Fulham
- Number: 2

Youth career
- –2005: Zeeburgia
- 2005–2013: Ajax

Senior career*
Years	Team	Apps	(Gls)
2013–2017	Jong Ajax	55	(4)
2013–2017	Ajax	31	(0)
2017–2020	Lyon	54	(1)
2018	Lyon B	2	(0)
2020–	Fulham	134	(5)

International career
2011–2012	Netherlands U17	5	(0)
2013–2014	Netherlands U19	4	(0)
2014	Netherlands U20	2	(0)
2015–2016	Netherlands U21	3	(0)
2015–2021	Netherlands	14	(0)
- * Club domestic league appearances and goals as of 22:04, 31 October 2026 (UTC)

Kenny Joelle Tete (born 9 October 1995) is a Dutch professional footballer who plays as a right-back for Premier League club Fulham.

== Club career ==
=== Ajax ===
Tete was born in Amsterdam where he grew up and played for AFC DWS and AVV Zeeburgia before he was recruited into the Ajax Academy in 2005 at the age of 10. The 2011–12 season saw Tete playing for the Ajax B1 team, the second highest youth level in the academy, as a right back, and helping his side to clinch the B-Juniors Eredivisie title. He signed his first professional contract with Ajax on 20 July 2012, binding him to the Amsterdam club until 30 June 2015. He spent his first year as a professional playing for the Ajax A1 youth team, without receiving any call-ups to the first team. The following season saw Tete, alongside fellow academy player Riechedly Bazoer, receive his first call-up to the first team which participated in the pre-season training camp in Austria. Tete appeared in his first match for the first team in a pre-season friendly match against SDC Putten on 29 June 2013. The match ended in a 4–1 away victory for Ajax, with Tete coming on as a substitute for Ruben Ligeon in the 45th minute.

He made his professional debut that season in the Eerste Divisie, the 2nd tier of professional football in the Netherlands, playing for the recently promoted reserves team Jong Ajax, in what would be the team's first-ever appearance in that division, against Telstar on 5 August 2013. The match ended in a 2–0 victory for Jong Ajax at the Amsterdam ArenA. Having appeared on the bench for the first team during the 2013–14 season, it wasn't until the second half of the 2014–15 season that Tete would make his debut for the first team in an official match, appearing in the 1–0 home loss to AZ Alkmaar on 5 February 2015 as a 69th-minute substitute. Tete went on to make 55 appearances for Ajax, including helping them reach the 2017 Europa League Final.

=== Lyon ===
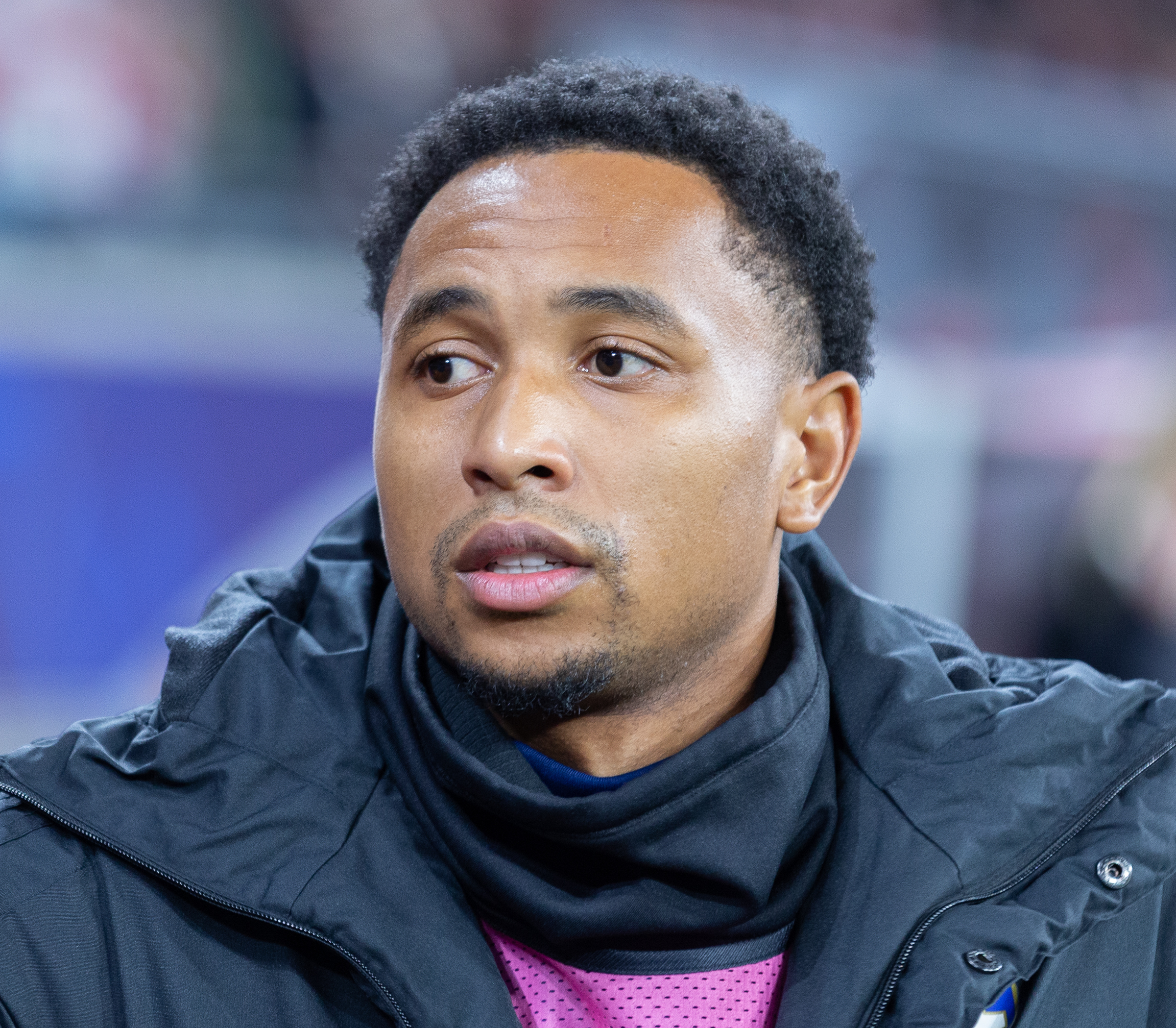
Tete with Lyon in 2019

On 10 July 2017, Tete was acquired by French side Lyon for a fee believed to be around €3m. Tete scored his first goal for Lyon in a 3–3 draw against Bordeaux in Ligue 1 play on 19 August 2017.

In total, Tete would go on to make 82 appearances for the club in just over three years with Lyon, prominently featuring in their run to the semi-finals of the UEFA Champions League during the 2019–20 season.

=== Fulham ===
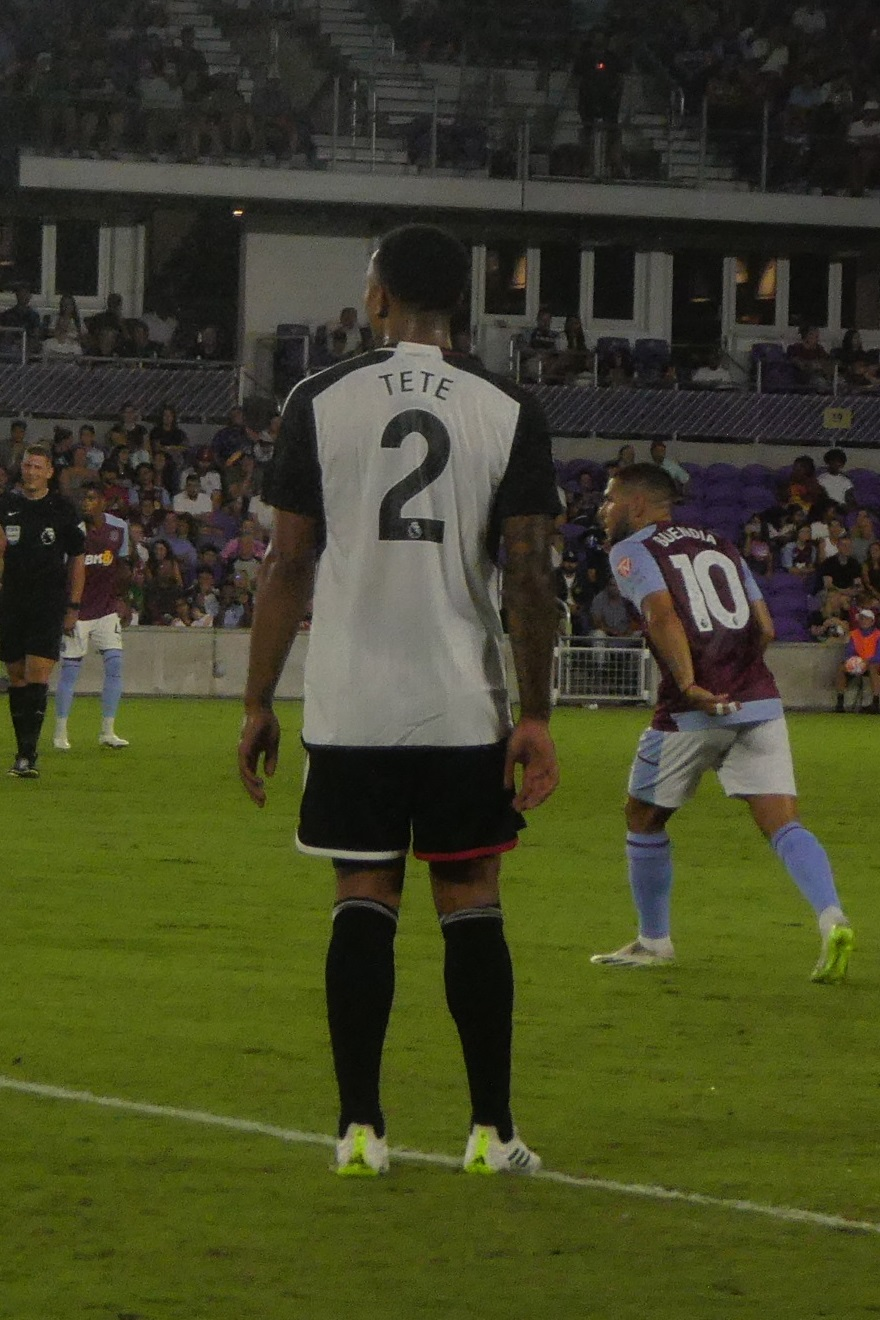
Tete playing for Fulham in 2023.

On 10 September 2020, Premier League club Fulham confirmed the signing of Tete from Lyon on a four-year deal with the option of a further year. He was given the number 2 shirt. Tete made his debut in a 1–0 win against Ipswich Town in the EFL Cup second round. He scored his first goal for Fulham in a 7–0 win at Reading on 11 January 2022.

In Fulham's opening match of the 2022–23 Premier League season, Tete provided the assist for Aleksandar Mitrović's opening goal in a 2–2 home draw against Liverpool. On 1 July 2025, he extended his contract with the club until 2028.

== International career ==
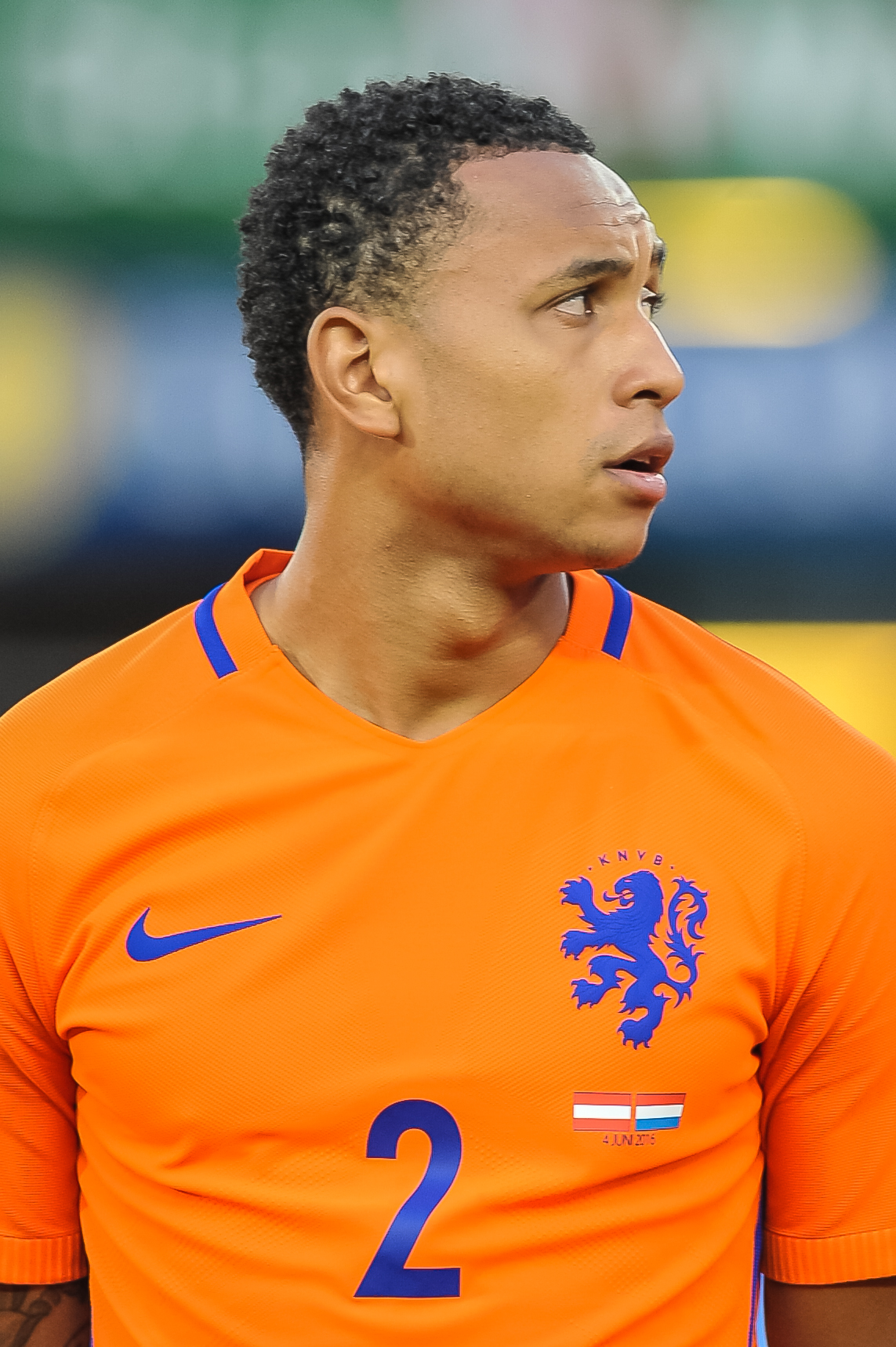
Tete with the Netherlands in 2016

On 25 October 2011, Tete made his debut for the Netherlands national under-17 team in a UEFA European Under-17 Championship qualifying match against Bosnia and Herzegovina, which ended in a 3–0 win for the Dutch. He made two further appearances during the qualifying rounds but was not included in the final 22-man squad which clinched the 2012 UEFA European Under-17 Championship in Slovakia.

Tete received his first under-19 call-up when he was named in the squad for the 2013 UEFA European Under-19 Championship. He appeared in all three group stage matches. The team defeated hosts Lithuania 3–2 in the opening match but lost their next two matches against Portugal and Spain, failing to advance past the group stage.

Tete received his first call up to the senior Netherlands team in August 2015. Tete played his first cap for the Dutch national team on 10 October against Kazakhstan.

== Personal life ==
Tete was born and raised in Amsterdam to a father from Beira, Mozambique and a mother from Nias, Indonesia. His father Miguel Tete had relocated to the Netherlands with his family at age 5 during the Mozambican War of Independence, and is a former European heavyweight kickboxing champion, who works at The Bulldog coffeeshop on the Leidseplein in downtown Amsterdam.

== Career statistics ==
=== Club ===
As of match played 31 October 2026

Appearances and goals by club, season and competition
Club	Season	League			National cup (Note: Includes KNVB Cup, Coupe de France, FA Cup)		League cup (Note: Includes Coupe de la Ligue, EFL Cup)		Europe		Other		Total	
Club	Season	Division	Apps	Goals	Apps	Goals	Apps	Goals	Apps	Goals	Apps	Goals	Apps	Goals
Jong Ajax	2013–14	Eerste Divisie	26	0	—		—		—		—		26	0
Jong Ajax	2014–15	Eerste Divisie	24	2	—		—		—		—		24	2
Jong Ajax	2015–16	Eerste Divisie	1	0	—		—		—		—		1	0
Jong Ajax	2016–17	Eerste Divisie	4	2	—		—		—		—		4	2
Jong Ajax	Total		55	4	—		—		—		—		55	4
Ajax	2013–14	Eredivisie	0	0	0	0	—		0	0	—		0	0
Ajax	2014–15	Eredivisie	5	0	0	0	—		0	0	—		5	0
Ajax	2015–16	Eredivisie	21	0	1	0	—		9 (Note: Two appearances in UEFA Champions League, seven appearances in UEFA Europa League)	0	—		31	0
Ajax	2016–17	Eredivisie	5	0	3	0	—		11 (Note: Three appearances in UEFA Champions League, eight appearances and one goal in UEFA Europa League)	1	—		19	1
Ajax	Total		31	0	4	0	—		20	1	—		55	1
Lyon	2017–18	Ligue 1	22	1	4	0	1	0	4 (Note: Appearances in UEFA Europa League)	0	—		31	1
Lyon	2018–19	Ligue 1	13	0	2	0	2	0	3 (Note: Appearances in UEFA Champions League)	0	—		20	0
Lyon	2019–20	Ligue 1	18	0	3	0	2	0	5	0	—		28	0
Lyon	2020–21	Ligue 1	1	0	—		—		—		—		1	0
Lyon	Total		54	1	9	0	5	0	12	0	—		80	1
Lyon B	2018–19	Championnat National 2	2	0	—		—		—		—		2	0
Fulham	2020–21	Premier League	22	0	1	0	1	0	—		—		24	0
Fulham	2021–22	Championship	20	2	0	0	0	0	—		—		20	2
Fulham	2022–23	Premier League	31	1	5	0	0	0	—		—		36	1
Fulham	2023–24	Premier League	14	1	2	0	3	0	—		—		19	1
Fulham	2024–25	Premier League	22	0	0	0	0	0	—		—		22	0
Fulham	2025–26	Premier League	22	1	0	0	1	0	—		—		23	1
Fulham	2026–27	Premier League	3	0	0	0	2	0	—		—		5	0
Fulham	Total		134	5	8	0	7	0	—		—		149	5
Career total			276	10	21	0	12	0	32	1	0	0	341	11

=== International ===
As of match played 24 March 2021

Appearances and goals by national team and year
National team	Year	Apps	Goals
Netherlands	2015	2	0
Netherlands	2016	2	0
Netherlands	2017	4	0
Netherlands	2018	4	0
Netherlands	2019	1	0
Netherlands	2020	0	0
Netherlands	2021	1	0
Total		14	0

== Honours ==
Ajax

- UEFA Europa League runner-up: 2016–17

Fulham

- EFL Championship: 2021–22

Netherlands U17

- UEFA European Under-17 Championship: 2012
