= Josh King (footballer, born 2007) =

English footballer (born 2007)

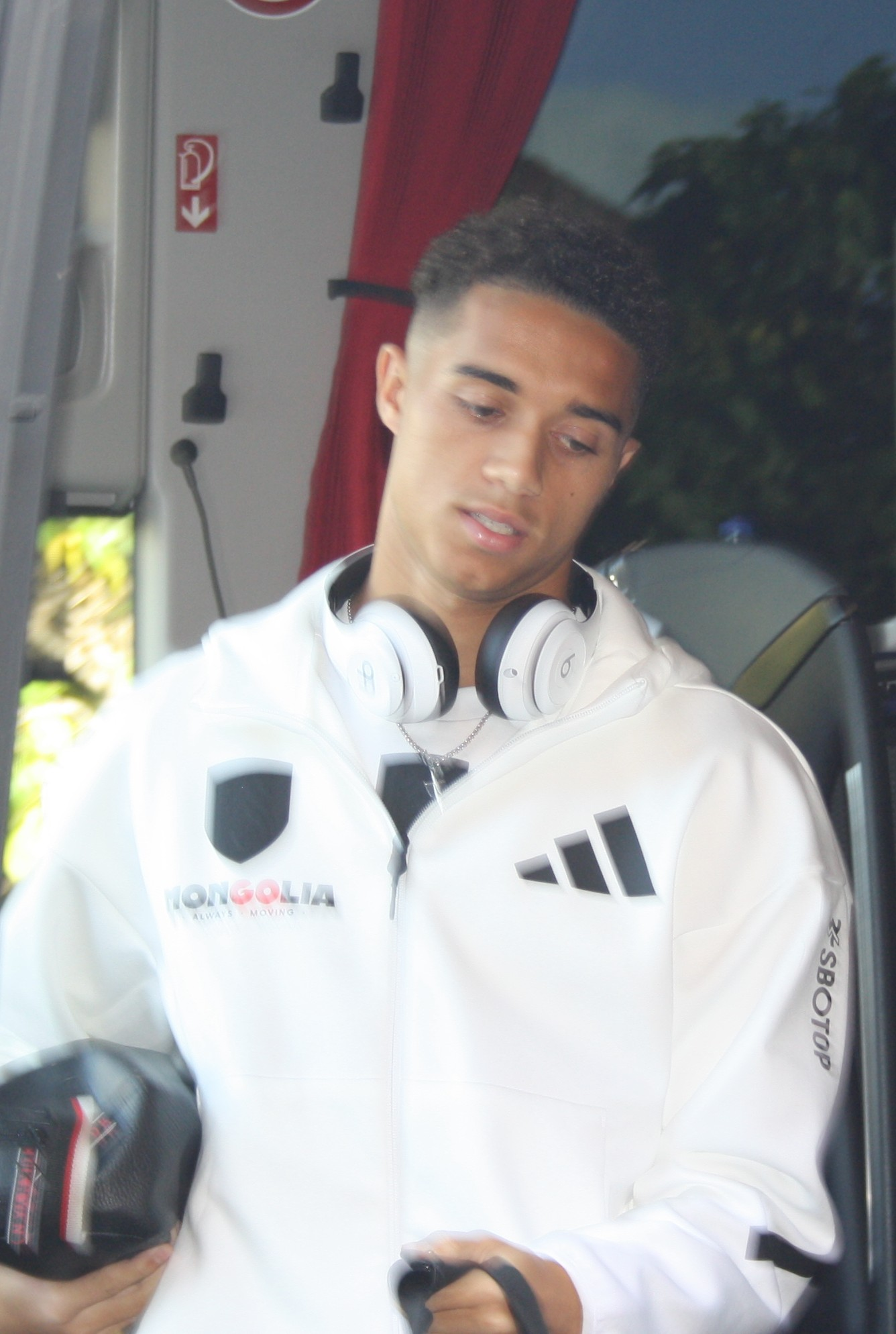
- King in 2025

Personal information
- Full name: Joshua David Steven King
- Date of birth: 3 January 2007 (age 19)
- Place of birth: Kingston upon Thames, England
- Height: 5 ft 8 in (1.72 m)
- Position: Central midfielder • Attacking midfielder

Team information
- Current team: Fulham
- Number: 24

Youth career
- 2015–2024: Fulham

Senior career*
Years	Team	Apps	(Gls)
2024–	Fulham	49	(3)

International career^{‡}
2022	England U15	3	(0)
2022–2023	England U16	8	(0)
2023–2024	England U17	11	(0)
2024	England U18	3	(0)
2024–	England U19	13	(2)
2025–	England U21	9	(1)
- * Club domestic league appearances and goals as of 22:02, 31 October 2026 (UTC) ‡ National team caps and goals as of 01:10, 7 October 2026 (UTC)

Joshua David Steven King (born 3 January 2007) is an English professional footballer who plays as a central midfielder or attacking midfielder for Premier League club Fulham.

== Early life ==
King was educated at Donhead Preparatory School in Wimbledon and later Hampton School in Middlesex, where he also played an integral role in the school's ESFA Cup win in 2023.

== Club career ==
King in 2024

King joined the Fulham academy aged eight and in June 2024 he won scholar of the year after being rewarded with his first professional contract with Fulham in the January of the first year.

On 27 August 2024, King made his professional club debut for Fulham coming on as a second-half substitute in an EFL Cup game against Birmingham City. On 5 December 2024, he made his first Premier League appearance in a victory over Brighton & Hove Albion. On 22 December 2024 King made his first start in the Premier League against Southampton.

On 17 July 2025, Fulham confirmed King had signed a new four year deal with the club, a contract which will run until 30 June 2029.

On 28 October 2025, King scored his first goal for Fulham against Wycombe Wanderers in the EFL Cup fourth round.

King scored his first Premier League goal on 21 March 2026, in a 3–1 victory over Burnley.

== International career ==
In August 2022, King captained England under-16 against Italy. He was a member of the England U19 squad at the 2025 UEFA European Under-19 Championship and scored a goal during a 5–5 group stage draw with Germany.

King made his England U21 debut on 10 October 2025 during a 4–0 victory away to Moldova. The following month saw him score his first goal at this level in an away win against Slovakia.

On 23 May 2026, it was announced King was one of four players (alongside Ethan Nwaneri, Alex Scott and Rio Ngumoha) that would join the senior team for the squad's preparation camp before the 2026 FIFA World Cup.

On 6 November 2026, King was called up for the England Squad for international break.

== Career statistics ==
=== Club ===
As of match played 31 October 2026

Appearances and goals by club, season and competition
Club	Season	League			FA Cup		EFL Cup		Other		Total	
Club	Season	Division	Apps	Goals	Apps	Goals	Apps	Goals	Apps	Goals	Apps	Goals
Fulham U21	2023–24	—			—		—		1 (Note: Appearance(s) in EFL Trophy)	0	1	0
Fulham U21	2024–25	—			—		—		2	0	2	0
Fulham U21	Total		—		—		—		3	0	3	0
Fulham	2024–25	Premier League	8	0	2	0	1	0	—		11	0
Fulham	2025–26	Premier League	31	1	2	0	3	1	—		36	2
Fulham	2026–27	Premier League	9	2	0	0	1	0	—		10	2
Fulham	Total		48	3	4	0	5	1	—		57	4
Career total			48	3	4	0	5	1	3	0	60	4
