= Samuel Amissah =

English footballer (born 2007)

Personal information
- Full name: Samuel Kweku Sarsah Amissah
- Date of birth: 7 March 2007 (age 19)
- Place of birth: London, England
- Height: 1.84 m (6 ft 0 in)
- Position: Defender

Team information
- Current team: Estoril Praia (on loan from Fulham)
- Number: 35

Youth career
- Brentford
- 2016–2024: Fulham

Senior career*
Years	Team	Apps	(Gls)
2024–	Fulham	0	(0)
2026–	→ Estoril Praia (loan)	0	(0)

International career^{‡}
2022–2023	England U16	5	(0)
2023–2024	England U17	7	(0)
2024–2025	England U18	7	(0)
2025–	England U19	7	(0)
- * Club domestic league appearances and goals as of 7 September 2026 ‡ National team caps and goals as of 31 March 2026

Samuel Kweku Sarsah Amissah (born 7 March 2007) is an English professional footballer who plays as a defender for Primeira Liga club Estoril Praia on loan from Fulham.

== Club career ==
Amissah came trough Brentford's Academy, which was disbanded in 2016, prompting a move to Fulham's youth setup.

Amissah was first called to the first team during the pre-season Premier League Summer Series in 2023, and came off the bench during a 2–0 loss to Aston Villa in Orlando.

During the 2023–24 season, Amissah made his debut with Fulham's reserve, in a 3–1 Premier League 2 loss to Leicester City on 29 September 2023.

In May 2024, Amissah signed his first professional contract with Fulham.

Amissah first appeared on the bench in an official senior game on 1 December 2024 during a 1–1 away draw against Tottenham.

During the 2025–26 season, Amissah started appearing more regularly on the first team bench, but without coming on, mainly making headlines for the big clubs reported interested in signing him, with his contract at Fulham ending in the summer 2026.

In July 2026, Amissah signed a new contract with Fulham until 2029, with the club holding the option to extend it by a further twelve months to 2030.

On 30 August 2026, Amissah was loaned to Estoril Praia in the Portuguese top tier.

== International career ==
Born in England, Amissah also has Ghanean origins. He is a youth international for England, having played for the under-16 and under-17. With the later, along the likes of Ethan Nwaneri, Divine Mukasa or Mikey Moore, he was among the top performers in an English side that reached the quarter-finals at the 2024 Euro, suffering a penalty shootout exit against future winner Italy.

Amissah then went on to establish himself as a regular with the under-18 and under-19 English teams.
