= Calvin Bassey =

Nigerian footballer (born 1999)

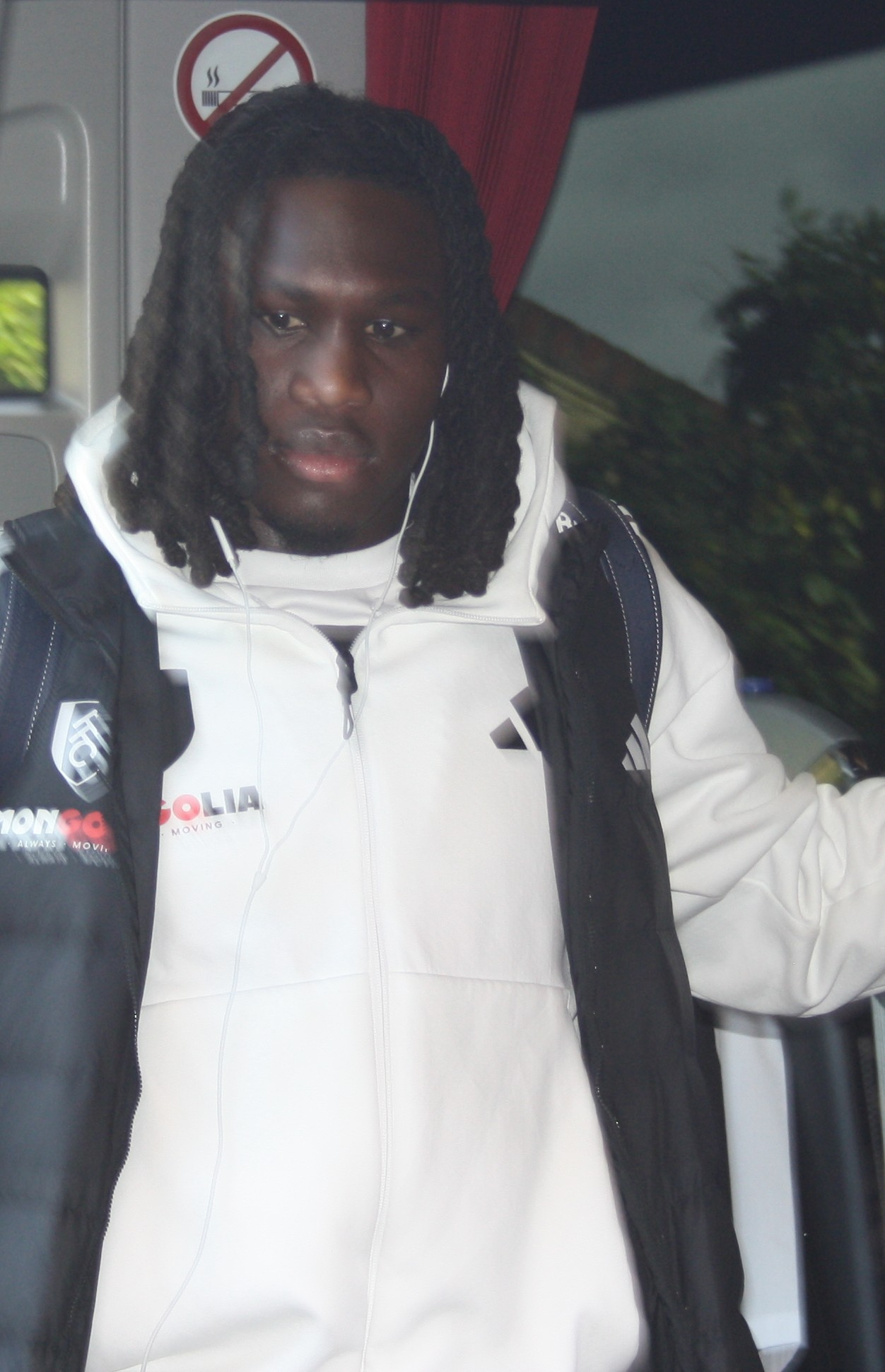
- Bassey with Fulham in 2025

Personal information
- Full name: Calvin Chinedu Bassey
- Birth name: Calvin Chinedu Ughelumba
- Date of birth: 31 December 1999 (age 26)
- Place of birth: Aosta, Italy
- Height: 1.85 m (6 ft 1 in)
- Positions: Left-back; centre-back

Team information
- Current team: Fulham
- Number: 3

Youth career
- 2015–2020: Leicester City

Senior career*
Years	Team	Apps	(Gls)
2020–2022	Rangers	37	(0)
2022–2023	Ajax	25	(1)
2023–	Fulham	103	(3)

International career^{‡}
2022–	Nigeria	49	(1)
Medal record
Men's football
Representing Nigeria
Africa Cup of Nations
Runner-up	2023 Ivory Coast
Third place	2025 Morocco
- * Club domestic league appearances and goals as of 22:00, 31 October 2026 (UTC) ‡ National team caps and goals as of 23:18, 17 November 2026 (UTC)

Calvin Chinedu Bassey MON (né Ughelumba, born 31 December 1999) is a professional footballer who plays as a left-back or a centre-back for Premier League club Fulham and the Nigeria national team.

Born in Italy to parents from Nigeria, Bassey was originally a product of Sunderland A.F.C.'s youth system, before eventually get removed to be a product of Leicester City's youth system. Although, he did not make a senior appearance for the club before joining Rangers on a free transfer in July 2020. He made 65 appearances over two seasons for Rangers and won the Scottish Premiership and the Scottish Cup. In July 2022, he signed for Dutch club Ajax, with Rangers receiving the highest transfer fee in their history. The following July, he signed for English club Fulham.

== Club career ==
=== Sunderland ===
Bassey joined Sunderland at the age of 12 after a successful youth trial, yet it only took him months for him to be released on unknown circumstances.

=== Leicester City ===
Bassey joined Leicester City at the age of 15 after a successful trial and progressed through the club's youth ranks, with regular appearances for the clubs' under-18 and under-23 sides.

=== Rangers ===
On 6 June 2020, Bassey signed a pre-contract with Rangers, officially joining the club with the opening of the summer transfer window in July. On 9 August 2020, he made his professional debut for Rangers in a Scottish Premiership match versus St Mirren as a substitute in a 3–0 win. Later that year, on 29 November, he scored his first and only goal for the club in a 4–0 away win against Falkirk in the Scottish League Cup.

Bassey was a key figure for Rangers during their run to the 2022 UEFA Europa League Final, which they lost on penalties to Eintracht Frankfurt.

=== Ajax ===
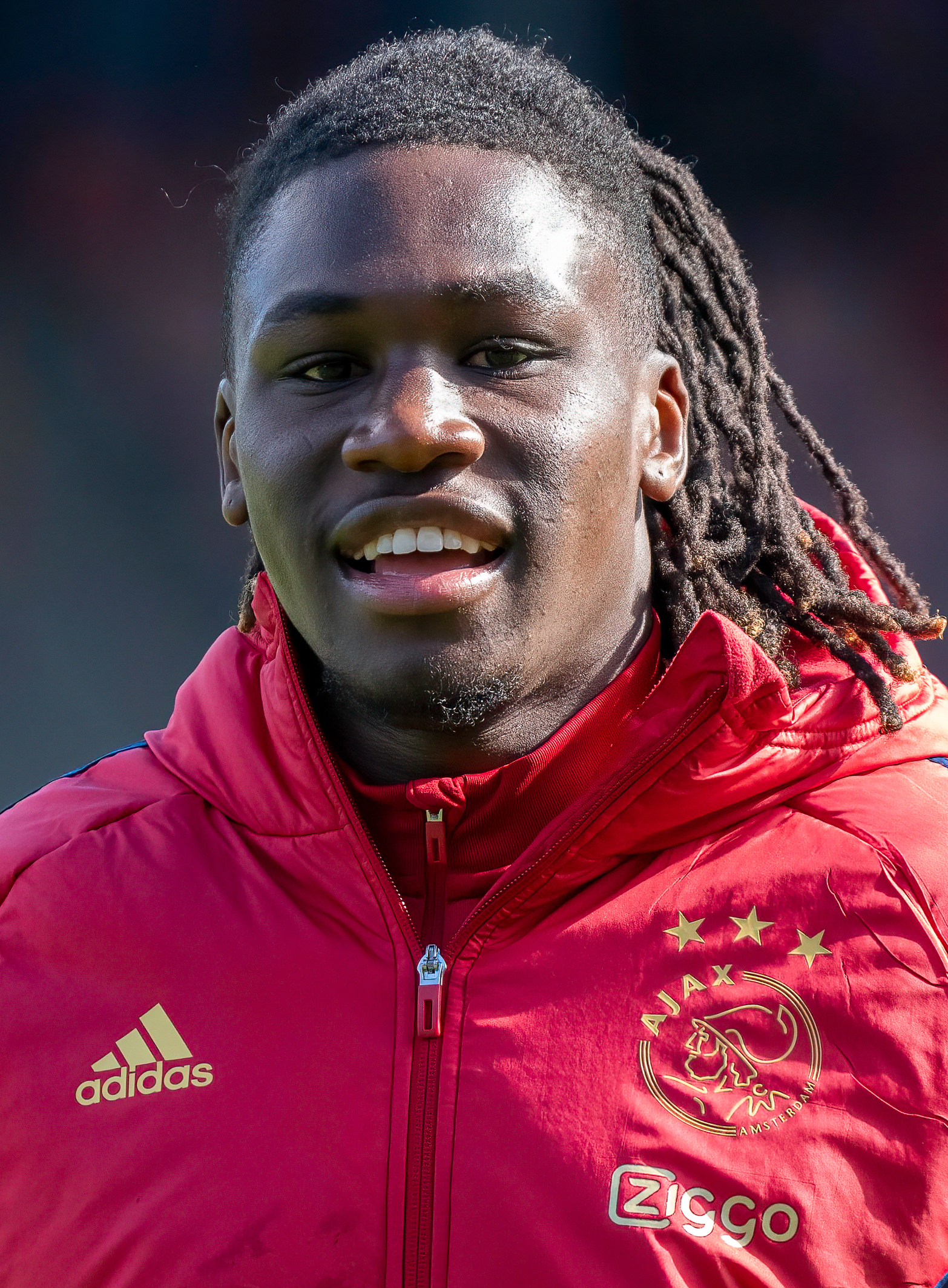
Bassey with Ajax in 2023

In July 2022, it was confirmed by Rangers that Bassey had been sold to Ajax for a club record fee of around £20 million. On his debut for the club in the 2022 Johan Cruyff Shield (Dutch Super Cup) on 31 July 2022, he received a direct red card 15 minutes after coming on as a substitute. On 7 September, he made his UEFA Champions League debut, providing an assist in a 4–0 win over his former club Rangers. A month later, on 8 October, he scored his first goal for Ajax in a 4–2 away win over Volendam.

=== Fulham ===
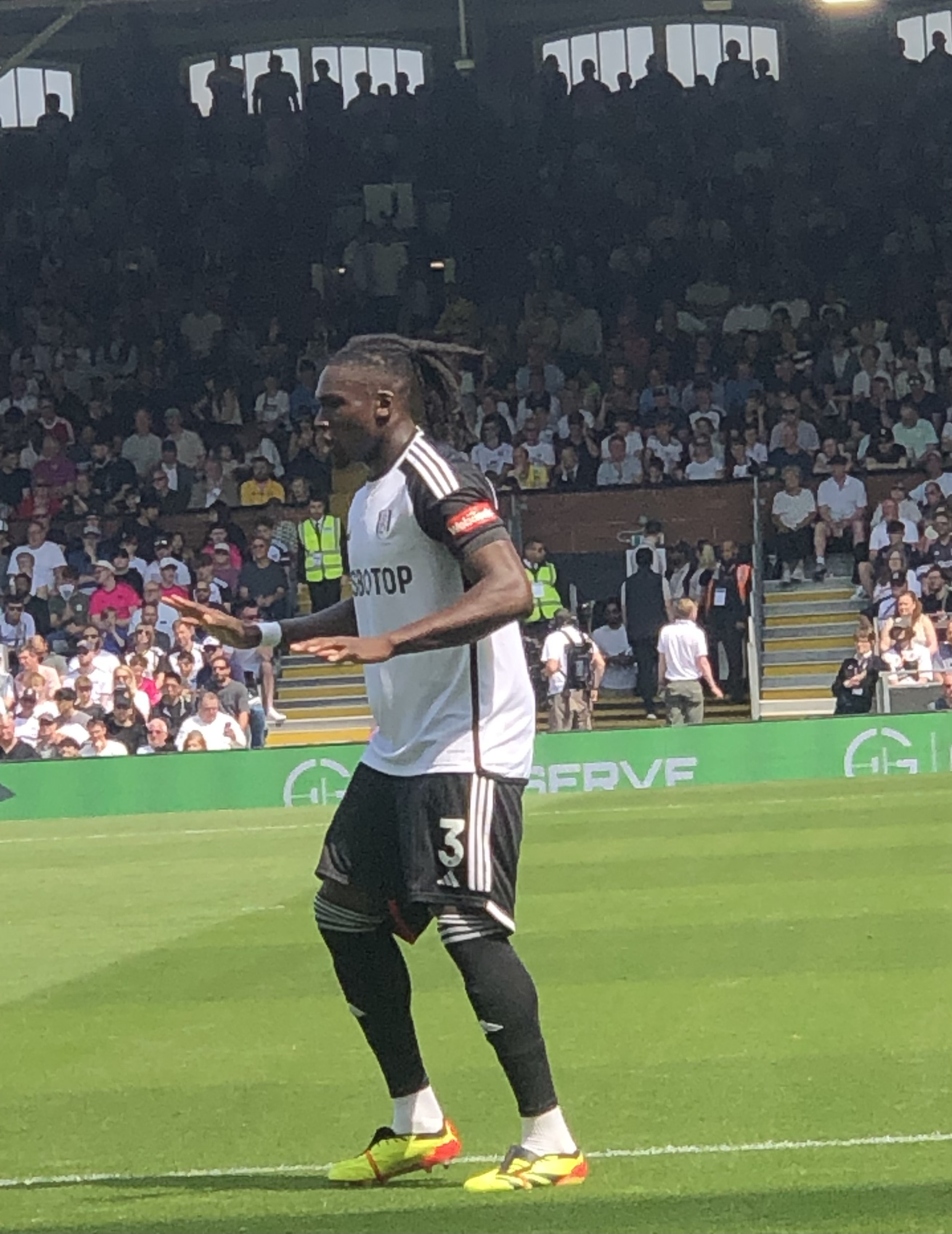
Bassey with Fulham in 2024

On 28 July 2023, Bassey joined Premier League club Fulham on a four-year deal. Fulham paid Ajax a transfer fee of €21 million. On 24 February 2024, Bassey scored his first goal for Fulham in a 2–1 away win against Manchester United, their first victory at Old Trafford since 2003.

== International career ==
Born in Italy, Bassey was eligible to play for Italy, Nigeria or England at international level.

In 2021, Bassey committed his international future to Nigeria when he accepted a call-up for their 2022 FIFA World Cup Qualifiers. He debuted with Nigeria in a 0–0 2022 FIFA World Cup qualification tie with Ghana on 25 March 2022.

On 9 September 2025, he scored his first international goal in a 1–1 away draw against South Africa during the 2026 FIFA World Cup qualification.

== Personal life ==
Bassey was born in Italy to Nigerian parents, but moved to England as a child. He grew up in Newham.

== Career statistics ==
=== Club ===
As of match played 31 October 2026

Appearances and goals by club, season and competition
Club	Season	League			National cup (Note: Includes Scottish Cup, KNVB Cup, FA Cup)		League cup (Note: Includes Scottish League Cup, EFL Cup)		Europe		Other		Total	
Club	Season	Division	Apps	Goals	Apps	Goals	Apps	Goals	Apps	Goals	Apps	Goals	Apps	Goals
Leicester City U21	2017–18	—			—		—		—		2 (Note: Appearances in EFL Trophy)	0	2	0
Leicester City U21	2018–19	—			—		—		—		3	0	3	0
Leicester City U21	2019–20	—			—		—		—		6	0	6	0
Leicester City U21	Total		—		—		—		—		11	0	11	0
Rangers	2020–21	Scottish Premiership	8	0	1	0	2	1	4 (Note: Appearances in UEFA Europa League)	0	—		15	1
Rangers	2021–22	Scottish Premiership	29	0	3	0	3	0	15	0	—		50	0
Rangers	Total		37	0	4	0	5	1	19	0	—		65	1
Ajax	2022–23	Eredivisie	25	1	5	0	—		8 (Note: Six appearances in UEFA Champions League, two appearances in UEFA Europa League)	0	1 (Note: Appearance in Johan Cruyff Shield)	0	39	1
Fulham	2023–24	Premier League	29	1	0	0	3	0	—		—		32	1
Fulham	2024–25	Premier League	35	1	2	1	0	0	—		—		37	2
Fulham	2025–26	Premier League	30	1	0	0	2	0	—		—		32	1
Fulham	2026–27	Premier League	9	0	0	0	2	0	—		—		11	0
Fulham	Total		103	3	2	1	7	0	—		—		112	4
Career total			165	4	11	1	12	1	27	0	12	0	227	6

=== International ===
As of match played 17 November 2026

Appearances and goals by national team and year
National team	Year	Apps	Goals
Nigeria	2022	8	0
Nigeria	2023	7	0
Nigeria	2024	14	0
Nigeria	2025	11	1
Nigeria	2026	9	0
Total		49	1

Scores and results list Nigeria's goal tally first, score column indicates score after each Bassey goal.

List of international goals scored by Calvin Bassey
No.	Date	Venue	Opponent	Score	Result	Competition
1	9 September 2025	Free State Stadium, Bloemfontein, South Africa	South Africa	1–1	1–1	2026 FIFA World Cup qualification

== Honours ==
Rangers

- Scottish Premiership: 2020–21
- Scottish Cup: 2021–22
- UEFA Europa League runner-up: 2021–22

Ajax

- KNVB Cup runner-up: 2022–23

Nigeria

- Africa Cup of Nations runner-up: 2023; third place: 2025

Individual

- UEFA Europa League Team of the Season: 2021–22
- Africa Cup of Nations Team of the Tournament: 2025

Orders

- Member of the Order of the Niger
