= Timothy Castagne =

Belgian footballer (born 1995)

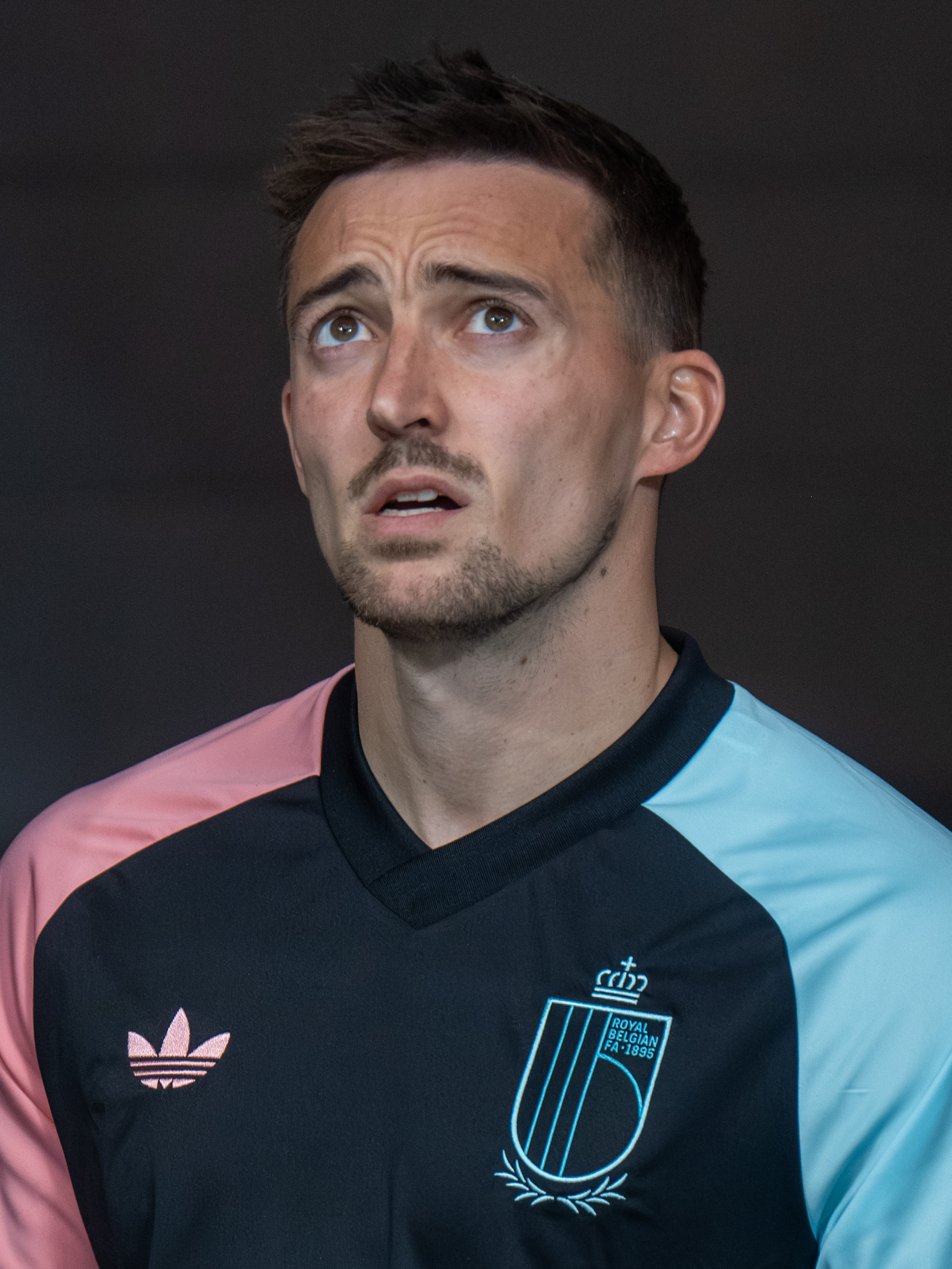
- Castagne with Belgium in 2026

Personal information
- Full name: Timothy Castagne
- Date of birth: 5 December 1995 (age 30)
- Place of birth: Arlon, Belgium
- Height: 1.85 m (6 ft 1 in)
- Position: Full back

Team information
- Current team: Fulham
- Number: 21

Youth career
- 2002–2004: SB Waltzing-Bonnert
- 2004–2006: Lorrain Arlon
- 2006–2011: Virton
- 2011–2014: Genk

Senior career*
Years	Team	Apps	(Gls)
2014–2017	Genk	80	(1)
2017–2020	Atalanta	75	(5)
2020–2023	Leicester City	91	(5)
2023–	Fulham	96	(1)

International career^{‡}
2013	Belgium U18	4	(0)
2013–2014	Belgium U19	12	(0)
2014–2016	Belgium U21	7	(1)
2018–	Belgium	75	(2)
- * Club domestic league appearances and goals as of 22:02, 31 October 2026 (UTC) ‡ National team caps and goals as of 22:40, 15 November 2026 (UTC)

Timothy Castagne (Note: French pronunciation: [timɔti kastaɲ]) (born 5 December 1995) is a Belgian professional footballer who plays as a full back for Premier League club Fulham and the Belgium national team.

Castagne began his senior career with Genk after graduating from the club's youth academy. After moving to Italy with Atalanta in 2017, he was signed by English side Leicester City in 2020, with whom he won the FA Cup in 2021. He joined Fulham in 2023.

Castagne represented Belgium at various youth levels before making his debut for the senior team in 2018. He was part of Belgium's squad at the 2022 FIFA World Cup, UEFA Euro 2024 and the 2026 World Cup.

== Club career ==
=== Early career ===
Born in Arlon, Belgian Luxembourg, Castagne began playing football for local clubs US Waltzing and Lorrain Arlon before moving to the youth academy of Virton, the largest club in the province. He practised with the youth teams of Standard Liège after going to a boarding school in the area, but continued to play matches at Virton at the weekend.

=== Genk ===
In 2011, Castagne moved to Genk, after Standard decided not to recruit him permanently. In June 2013, he signed a professional contract for three years at Genk. In January 2014, then Genk coach Mario Been included him in training camp with the first team after leaving a good impression, which meant that he was definitively included in the first team in the second half of the season. He made his Belgian Pro League debut under new head coach Alex McLeish on 14 September 2014 as a starter against Club Brugge. On 2 May 2015, Castagne scored his first senior goal in a 7–1 home win.

=== Atalanta ===
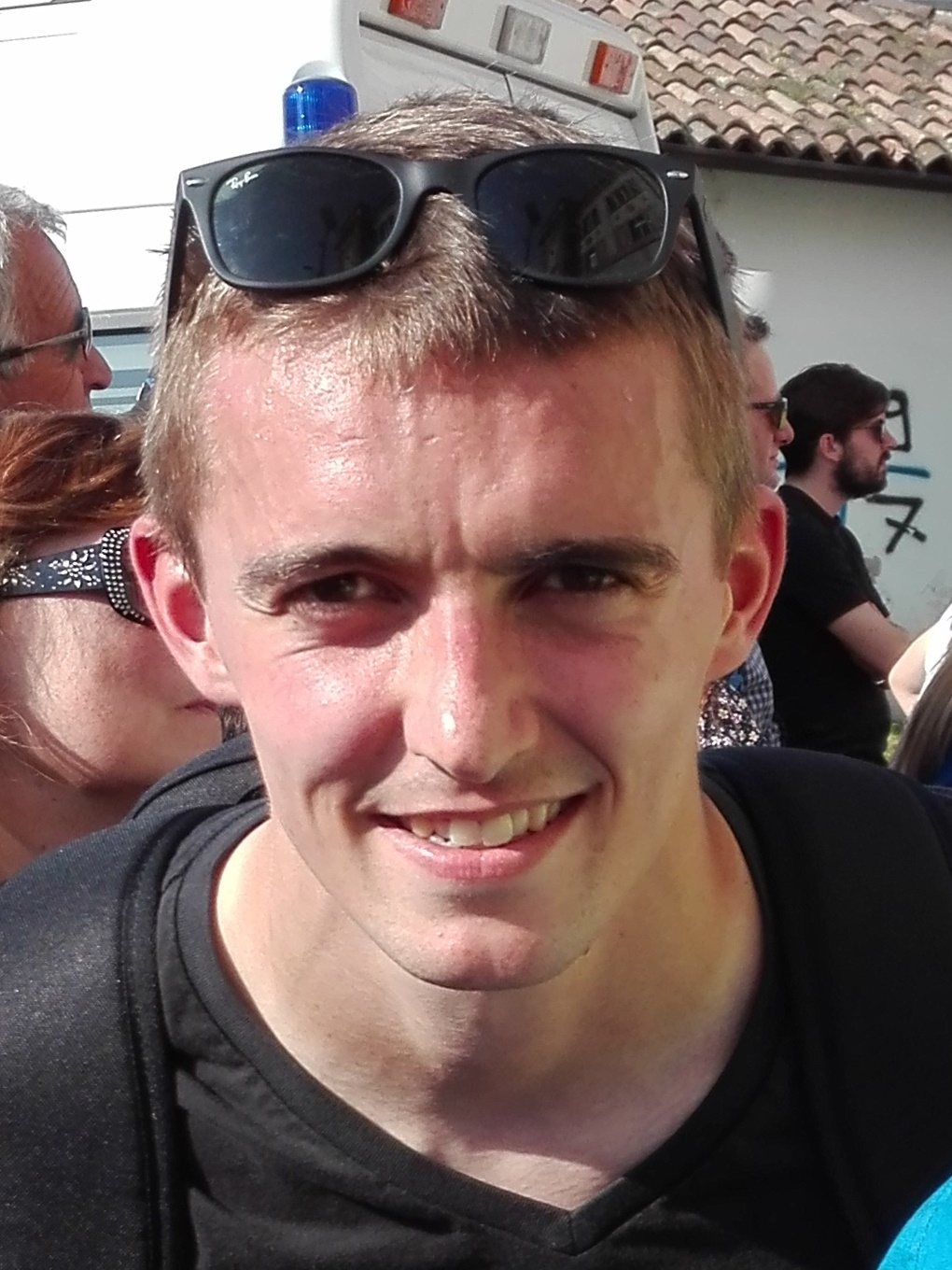
Castagne in 2018

In July 2017, he joined Serie A club Atalanta in a €6 million deal, after Andrea Conti had left Atalanta for Milan. He scored his first goal for the Bergamo team on 2 January 2018, in Coppa Italia win over Napoli.

After a first season of adaptation, his play improved in the first half of the second season, and on 27 August 2018, he scored his first goal in the Serie A in a 3–3 draw against Roma. Alternating with Hans Hateboer on the right wing-back, he scored 4 goals in the league overall; the others came in the second leg against Roma, and in two important end-of-season victories against Lazio (1–3), and Genoa (2–1).

The following year he continued to alternate with Hateboer, scoring two goals in all competitions: on 22 September 2019, he scored the equalising goal in the 95th minute against Fiorentina in a 2–2 draw, and the other in the UEFA Champions League in which he scored the first goal in a 0–3 win against Shakhtar Donetsk which allowed the Nerazzurri to advance to the round of 16.

During three years at Atalanta, Castagne made 96 appearances and scored 8 goals in all competitions. His farewell was motivated by a difficult relationship with the coach Gian Piero Gasperini.

=== Leicester City ===
On 3 September 2020, Castagne completed a move to Premier League club Leicester City on a 5-year deal. On 13 September 2020, he scored his first goal for Leicester City in a 3–0 win over West Bromwich Albion; hence, he became the fifth Belgian player to score on his Premier League debut, after Luc Nilis, Thomas Vermaelen, Christian Benteke and Leandro Trossard.

=== Fulham ===
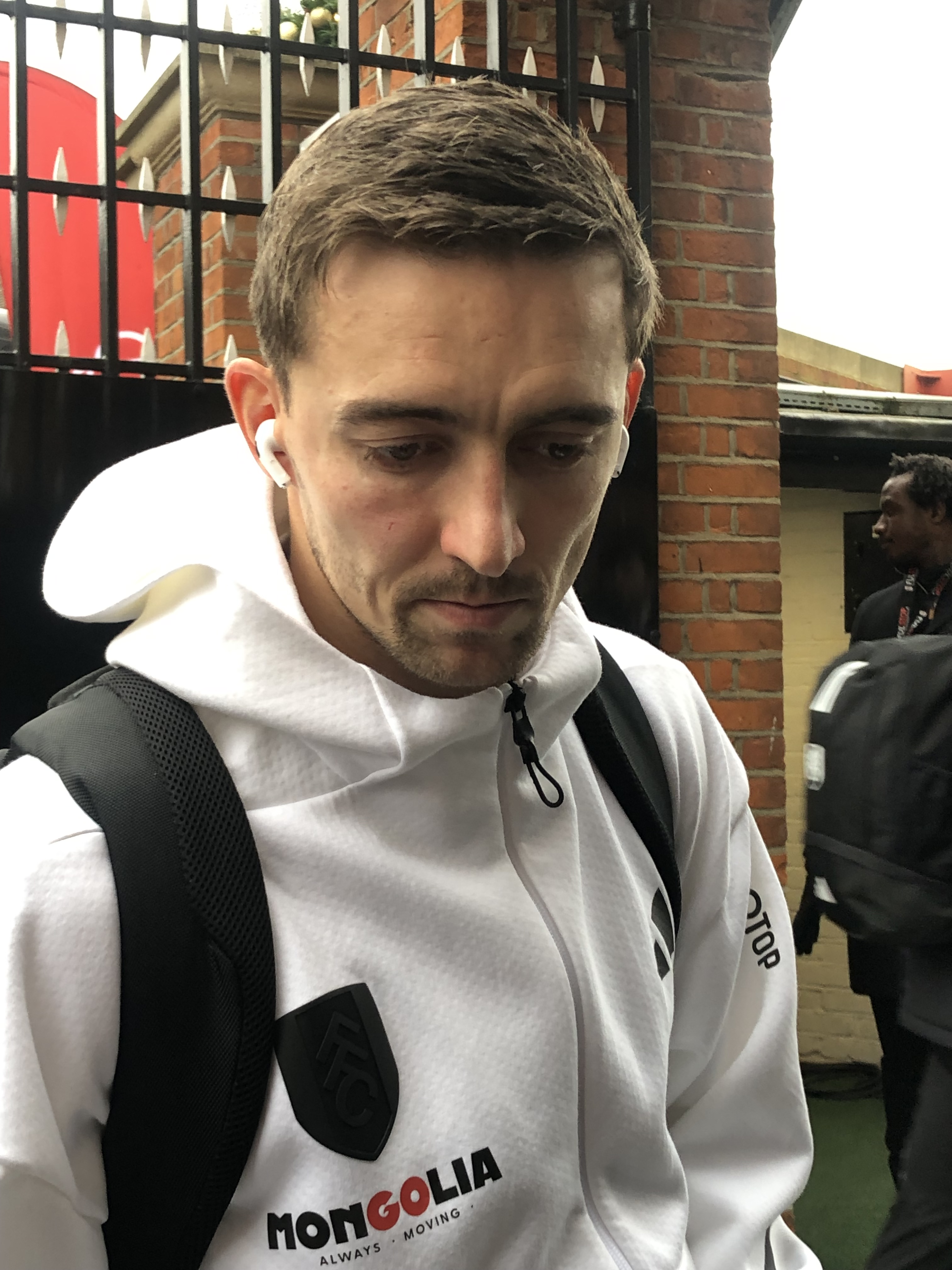
Castagne with Fulham in 2024.

On 29 August 2023, following Leicester's relegation to the Championship the previous season, Premier League side Fulham announced the signing of Castagne on a four-year contract, with an option for a further year, for an undisclosed fee, reported to be around £15 million. On 21 April 2024, he scored his first goal for Fulham in a 3–1 loss to Liverpool.

== International career ==
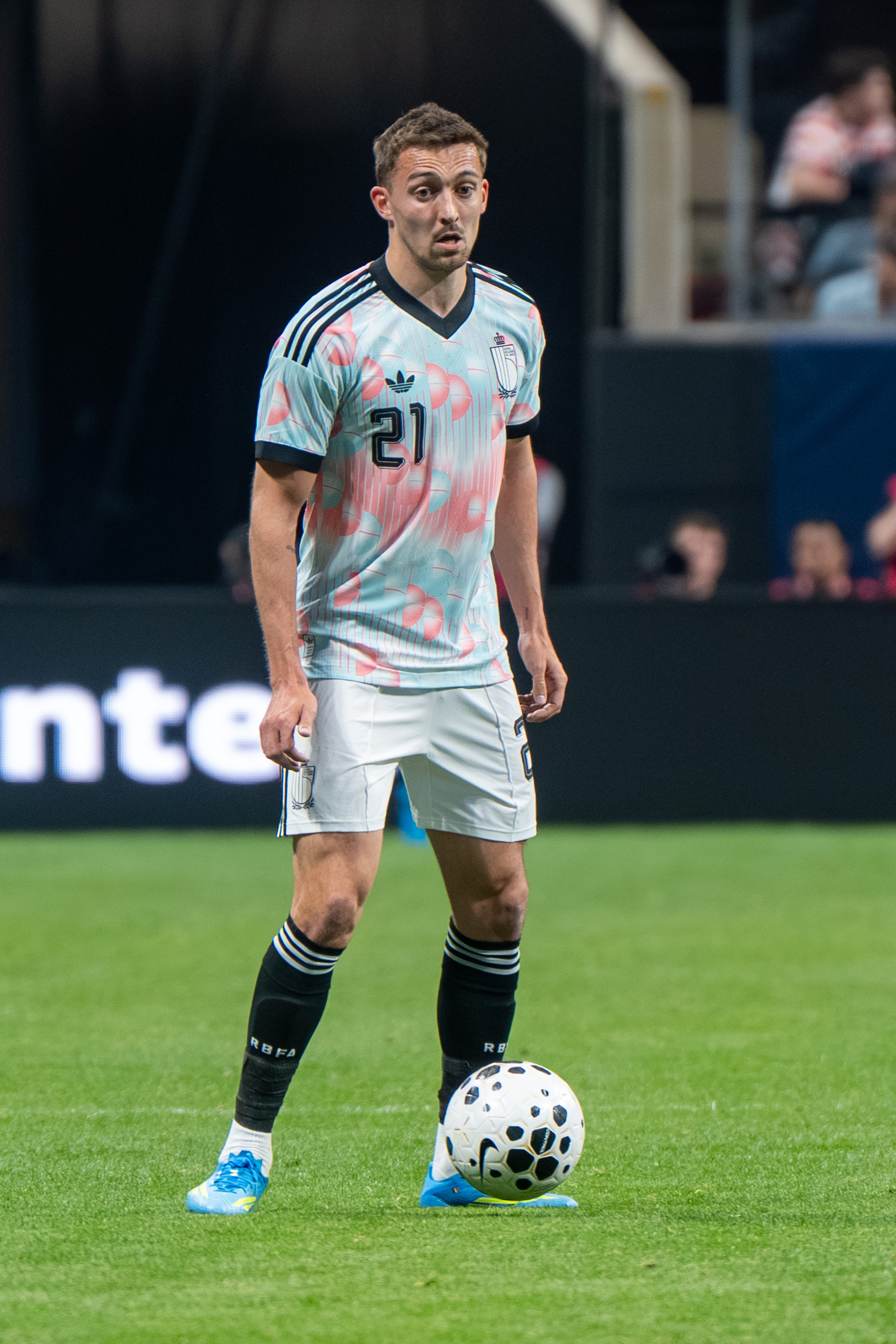
Castagne playing for Belgium against the United States in 2026.

Castagne made his international debut for Belgium on 7 September 2018 in a friendly against Scotland, as a starter.

On 22 March 2019, he provided an assist for his now Leicester teammate Youri Tielemans in a 3–1 win against Russia in the UEFA Euro 2020 qualifiers.

On 12 June 2021, in the 25th minute of Belgium's opening game of the UEFA Euro 2020 against Russia, he collided head-to-head with Daler Kuzyayev. Both had to be substituted. Castagne suffered a double eye-socket fracture and had to leave the tournament.

On 15 May 2026, he was named in Belgium's squad for the 2026 FIFA World Cup.

== Career statistics ==
=== Club ===
As of match played 31 October 2026

Appearances and goals by club, season and competition
Club	Season	League			National cup (Note: Includes Belgian Cup, Coppa Italia, FA Cup)		League cup (Note: Includes EFL Cup)		Europe		Total	
Club	Season	Division	Apps	Goals	Apps	Goals	Apps	Goals	Apps	Goals	Apps	Goals
Genk	2013–14	Belgian Pro League	0	0	0	0	—		0	0	0	0
Genk	2014–15	Belgian Pro League	27	1	1	0	—		—		28	1
Genk	2015–16	Belgian Pro League	21	0	1	0	—		—		22	0
Genk	2016–17	Belgian Pro League	32	0	5	0	—		12 (Note: Appearances in UEFA Europa League)	2	49	2
Genk	Total		80	1	7	0	—		12	2	99	3
Atalanta	2017–18	Serie A	20	0	3	1	—		3	0	26	1
Atalanta	2018–19	Serie A	28	4	5	1	—		4	0	37	5
Atalanta	2019–20	Serie A	27	1	0	0	—		6 (Note: Appearances in UEFA Champions League)	1	33	2
Atalanta	Total		75	5	8	2	—		13	1	96	8
Leicester City	2020–21	Premier League	27	2	5	0	0	0	2	0	34	2
Leicester City	2021–22	Premier League	27	1	0	0	0	0	9 (Note: Five appearances in UEFA Europa League, four appearances in UEFA Europa Conference League)	0	36	1
Leicester City	2022–23	Premier League	37	2	2	0	3	0	—		42	2
Leicester City	Total		91	5	7	0	3	0	11	0	112	5
Fulham	2023–24	Premier League	34	1	1	0	4	0	—		39	1
Fulham	2024–25	Premier League	24	0	4	1	2	0	—		30	1
Fulham	2025–26	Premier League	30	0	3	0	3	0	—		36	0
Fulham	2026–27	Premier League	8	0	0	0	1	0	—		9	0
Fulham	Total		96	1	8	1	10	0	—		114	2
Career total			342	12	30	3	13	0	36	3	421	18

=== International ===
As of match played 15 November 2026

Appearances and goals by national team and year
National team	Year	Apps	Goals
Belgium	2018	2	0
Belgium	2019	5	2
Belgium	2020	4	0
Belgium	2021	10	0
Belgium	2022	8	0
Belgium	2023	10	0
Belgium	2024	14	0
Belgium	2025	7	0
Belgium	2026	14	0
Total		75	2

Scores and results list Belgium's goal tally first

List of international goals scored by Timothy Castagne
No.	Date	Venue	Opponent	Score	Result	Competition
1	8 June 2019	King Baudouin Stadium, Brussels, Belgium	Kazakhstan	2–0	3–0	UEFA Euro 2020 qualifying
2	10 October 2019	King Baudouin Stadium, Brussels, Belgium	San Marino	9–0	9–0	UEFA Euro 2020 qualifying

== Honours ==
Leicester City

- FA Cup: 2020–21
