= Jonah Kusi-Asare =

Swedish footballer (born 2007)

- Kusi-Asare in 2026

Personal information
- Full name: Jonah Daniel Kusi-Asare
- Date of birth: 4 July 2007 (age 19)
- Place of birth: Solna, Sweden
- Height: 1.96 m (6 ft 5 in)
- Position: Striker

Team information
- Current team: Fulham
- Number: 18

Youth career
- 2012–2022: IF Brommapojkarna
- 2023: AIK

Senior career*
Years	Team	Apps	(Gls)
2023	AIK	4	(0)
2024–2026	Bayern Munich II	13	(2)
2024–2026	Bayern Munich	2	(0)
2025–2026	→ Fulham (loan)	7	(0)
2026–	Fulham	0	(0)

International career^{‡}
2022–2024	Sweden U17	15	(6)
2024	Sweden U19	2	(0)
2025–	Sweden U21	12	(1)
- * Club domestic league appearances and goals as of 17:01, 9 May 2026 (UTC) ‡ National team caps and goals as of 17:48, 1 April 2026 (UTC)

Jonah Daniel Kusi-Asare (born 4 July 2007) is a Swedish professional footballer who plays as a striker for Premier League club Fulham. He is a Sweden youth international.

== Club career ==
=== AIK ===
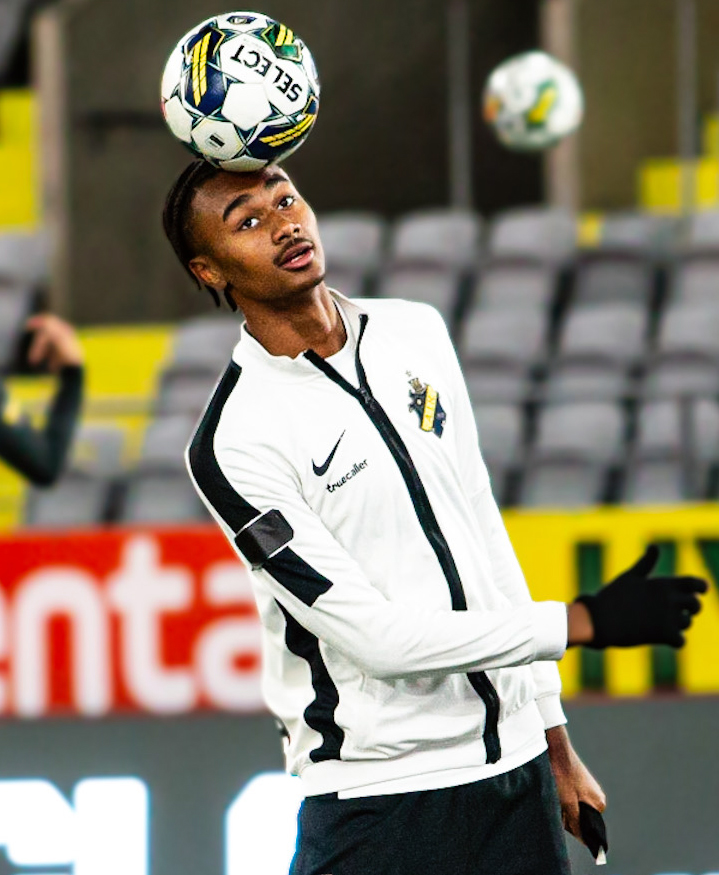
Kusi-Asare in 2023

Kusi-Asare played for the youth teams of IF Brommapojkarna. He moved to AIK in January 2023. On 28 August 2023, he made his senior debut for AIK against Varberg in the Allsvenskan, becoming the youngest AIK player ever at the age of 16 years, 1 month and 24 days. He finished the 2023 season with four appearances in the Allsvenskan.

=== Bayern Munich ===
On 1 February 2024, Kusi-Asare signed for German Bundesliga side Bayern Munich for a reported fee of €4,500,000 set to initially join the under-19 roster. He was promoted to Bayern Munich II for the 2024–25 season.

He made his debut with Bayern Munich II on 30 August 2024, for a 1–1 draw Regionalliga Bayern home match against DJK Vilzing.

Kusi-Asare received his first call-up with the Bayern Munich senior team for a 2–1 away loss Bundesliga match against Mainz 05, on 14 December 2024.

He was called-up with the Bayern Munich senior team for a friendly match on 6 January 2025, after the 2024 winter break concluded, in which he substituted Michael Olise at the 63rd minute of a 6–0 win over Austrian Bundesliga club Red Bull Salzburg. On 26 April 2025, Kusi-Asare made his debut with the Bayern Munich senior team, substituting Harry Kane for a 3–0 home win Bundesliga match against Mainz 05.

On 11 June 2025, Bayern Munich announced their 32-player final squad for the FIFA Club World Cup, which included Kusi-Asare.

He was one of the players that were called up by Bayern Munich head coach Vincent Kompany, for the 2025 pre-season matches against French Ligue 1 club Lyon and English Premier League club Tottenham Hotspur, on 2 and 7 August 2025, respectively.

==== Loan to Fulham ====
On 1 September 2025, he moved to England and joined Premier League club Fulham, on an initial one-year loan deal with a club option to buy at the end of the 2025–26 season.

=== Fulham ===
On 27 June 2026, Kusi-Asare transferred permanently with Fulham, ahead of the 2026–27 season.

== International career ==
Kusi-Asare has represented Sweden at the youth level internationally, featuring for the U17, U19 and U21.

== Personal life ==
Kusi-Asare is the son of the Swedish-Ghanaian former footballer Jones Kusi-Asare. His mother is Finnish. He is eligible to represent Sweden, Ghana and Finland.

== Career statistics ==
As of match played 9 May 2026

Appearances and goals by club, season and competition
Club	Season	League			National cup (Note: Includes FA Cup)		League cup (Note: Includes EFL Cup)		Europe		Other		Total	
Club	Season	Division	Apps	Goals	Apps	Goals	Apps	Goals	Apps	Goals	Apps	Goals	Apps	Goals
AIK	2023	Allsvenskan	4	0	0	0	—		—		—		4	0
Bayern Munich II	2024–25	Regionalliga Bayern	12	2	—		—		—		—		12	2
Bayern Munich II	2025–26	Regionalliga Bayern	1	0	—		—		—		—		1	0
Bayern Munich II	Total		13	2	—		—		—		—		13	2
Bayern Munich	2024–25	Bundesliga	1	0	0	0	—		0	0	0	0	1	0
Bayern Munich	2025–26	Bundesliga	1	0	0	0	—		—		0	0	1	0
Bayern Munich	Total		2	0	0	0	—		0	0	0	0	2	0
Fulham (loan)	2025–26	Premier League	7	0	1	0	2	0	—		—		10	0
Fulham U21 (loan)	2025–26	—			—		—		—		1 (Note: Appearance in EFL Trophy)	1	1	1
Career total			26	2	1	0	2	0	0	0	1	1	30	3

== Honours ==
Bayern Munich

- Bundesliga: 2024–25
- Franz Beckenbauer Supercup: 2025
