= César Palacios (footballer, born 2004) =

Spanish footballer (born 2004)

- Palacios with Fulham in 2026

Personal information
- Full name: César Palacios Pérez
- Date of birth: 11 November 2004 (age 22)
- Place of birth: Soria, Spain
- Height: 1.82 m (6 ft 0 in)
- Position: Midfielder

Team information
- Current team: Fulham
- Number: 8

Youth career
- 2010–2020: Numancia
- 2020–2023: Real Madrid

Senior career*
Years	Team	Apps	(Gls)
2023–2026	Real Madrid B	68	(16)
2026	Real Madrid	5	(0)
2026–	Fulham	9	(1)

International career^{‡}
2022–2023	Spain U19	12	(7)
2022	Spain U20	2	(0)
- * Club domestic league appearances and goals as of 21:38, 21 November 2026 (UTC) ‡ National team caps and goals as of 00:31, 18 February 2024 (UTC)

César Palacios Pérez (born 11 November 2004) is a Spanish professional footballer who plays as a midfielder for Premier League club Fulham.

== Club career ==
Born in Soria to former footballer César Palacios Chocarro, Palacios started his career with the same side his father had represented for the last six years of his career, Numancia.

=== Real Madrid ===
After ten years with Numancia, he was signed by La Liga side Real Madrid in June 2020.

His career with the Real Madrid youth teams got off to a good start, and he was promoted from the Juvenil C team to the Juvenil B team, having amassed a number of goals and assists in his first season. He signed a contract extension in May 2022, keeping him with Los Blancos until 2027.

He notably scored a brace against the youth side of Valencia in a 3–1 win in the quarter final of the 2023 Copa del Rey Juvenil. He featured in the final as Real Madrid beat Almería.

In August 2024, he suffered a cruciate ligament injury during pre-season match with first team against AC Milan. After nine months absence, he made his return to action, coming on as a substitute against Marbella in the matchday of Primera Federación.

On 14 January 2026, Palacios made his debut for the senior team in a Copa del Rey defeat against Albacete. He came in as a substitute in the 76th minute, replacing Franco Mastantuono. Palacios made his Champions League debut on 25 February 2026, coming on in the 84th minute against Benfica replacing Arda Güler and receiving a yellow card in the 96th minute.

=== Fulham ===
On 3 August 2026, Palacios signed a five-year contract with Premier League club Fulham. The move reunited him with his former coach at Real Madrid, Álvaro Arbeloa.

== International career ==
Palacios has represented Spain at under-19 and under-20 level. He scored on his debut with the under-19 side in a 1–0 win against Germany.

== Career statistics ==
As of match played 21 November 2026

Appearances and goals by club, season and competition
Club	Season	League			National cup (Note: Includes Copa del Rey, FA Cup)		League cup (Note: Includes EFL Cup)		Europe		Other		Total	
Club	Season	Division	Apps	Goals	Apps	Goals	Apps	Goals	Apps	Goals	Apps	Goals	Apps	Goals
Real Madrid B	2023–24	Primera Federación	36	3	—		—		—		—		36	3
Real Madrid B	2024–25	Primera Federación	4	0	—		—		—		—		4	0
Real Madrid B	2025–26	Primera Federación	30	14	—		—		—		2	1	32	15
Real Madrid B	Total		70	17	—		—		—		2	1	72	18
Real Madrid	2025–26	La Liga	5	0	1	0	—		1 (Note: Appearance in UEFA Champions League)	0	0	0	7	0
Fulham	2026–27	Premier League	9	1	0	0	3	1	—		—		12	2
Career total			84	18	1	0	3	1	1	0	2	1	91	20

== Honours ==
Individual

- UEFA European Under-19 Championship Team of the Tournament: 2023
