= 2025–26 Fulham F.C. season =

128th season in existence of Fulham FC

Fulham
2025–26 season
- Owner: Shahid Khan
- Chairman: Shahid Khan
- Manager: Marco Silva
- Stadium: Craven Cottage
- Premier League: 11th
- FA Cup: Fifth round
- EFL Cup: Quarter-finals
- Top goalscorer: League: Harry Wilson (10); All: Harry Wilson (11)
- Highest home attendance: 27,736 (v. Arsenal, Premier League, 18 October 2025)
- Lowest home attendance: 11,749 (v. Bristol City, EFL Cup, 27 August 2025)
- Average home league attendance: 27,228
- Biggest win: 3–0 v. Wolverhampton Wanderers (H); Premier League, 1 November 2025
- Biggest defeat: 0–3 v. Manchester City (A); Premier League, 11 February 2026; 0–3 v. Arsenal (A); Premier League, 2 May 2026
Home colours	Away colours	Third colours

The 2025–26 season was the 128th season in the history of Fulham Football Club, and the club's fourth consecutive season in the Premier League. In addition to the domestic league, the club also participated in the FA Cup and the EFL Cup.

== Transfers and contracts ==
=== In ===
Date	Pos.	Player	From	Fee	Ref.
26 July 2025	GK	(France) Benjamin Lecomte	(France) Montpellier	£500,000	
1 September 2025	LW	(Brazil) Kevin	(Ukraine) Shakhtar Donetsk	£34,600,000	
30 January 2026	RW	(Norway) Oscar Bobb	(England) Manchester City	£27,000,000 (Note: Includes a 20% sell-on clause)	

Total expenditure: ▼£62,100,000 (excluding add-ons, bonuses and undisclosed figures)

=== Out ===
Date	Pos.	Player	To	Fee	Ref.
29 August 2025	CAM	(Brazil) Andreas Pereira	(Brazil) Palmeiras	£8,650,000	
1 September 2025	LW	(Ivory Coast) Martial Godo	(France) Strasbourg	£7,000,000	
28 January 2026	RW	(Spain) Adama Traoré	(England) West Ham United	£1,000,000 (Note: Rising to £2,000,000 with add-ons)	

Total income: ▲£16,650,000 (excluding add-ons, bonuses and undisclosed figures)

=== Loaned in ===
Date	Pos.	Player	From	Date until	Ref.
1 September 2025	RW	(Nigeria) Samuel Chukwueze	(Italy) AC Milan	31 May 2026 (Note: Option to make move permanent)	
1 September 2025	CF	(Sweden) Jonah Kusi-Asare	(Germany) Bayern Munich	31 May 2026	

=== Loaned out ===
Date	Pos.	Player	To	Date until	Ref.
3 July 2025	CM	(New Zealand) Matt Dibley-Dias	(England) Chesterfield	7 January 2026 (Note: On 7 January, Dibley-Dias' and Tanton's initial season-long loan at Chesterfield was terminated)	
8 July 2025	RB	(Colombia) Devan Tanton	(England) Chesterfield	7 January 2026	
25 July 2025	GK	(Germany) Steven Benda	(England) Millwall	12 January 2026 (Note: On 12 January, Benda's initial season-long loan at Millwall was terminated)	
25 July 2025	CAM	(Wales) Luke Harris	(England) Oxford United	7 January 2026 (Note: On 7 January, Harris' season-long loan at Oxford United was terminated)	
30 July 2025	CB	(Canada) Luc de Fougerolles	(Belgium) Dender	31 May 2026	
8 August 2025	CF	(England) Olly Sanderson	(England) Woking	31 May 2026	
29 August 2025	CB	(England) Harvey Araujo	(England) Colchester United	31 May 2026	
13 September 2025	RW	(England) Terrell Works	(England) Braintree Town	6 December 2025	
7 November 2025	CB	(England) Eddy Nsasi	(England) Wealdstone	6 December 2025	
8 January 2026	CM	(England) Chibuzo Nwoko	(England) Forest Green Rovers	31 May 2026	
13 January 2026	GK	(England) Marco Underwood	(England) Uxbridge	31 May 2026	
13 January 2026	RW	(England) Terrell Works	(England) Yeovil Town	31 May 2026	
15 January 2026	CF	(England) Aaron Loupalo-Bi	(England) Walsall	31 May 2026	
19 January 2026	CAM	(Wales) Luke Harris	(England) Wycombe Wanderers	31 May 2026	
3 February 2026	GK	(Germany) Steven Benda	(Netherlands) Feyenoord	31 May 2026	
25 February 2026	CM	(New Zealand) Matt Dibley-Dias	(England) Braintree Town	31 May 2026	

=== Released / Out of contract ===
Date	Pos.	Player	Subsequent club	Join date	Ref.
30 June 2025	CM	(Jamaica) Delano McCoy-Splatt	(England) AFC Wimbledon	1 July 2025	
30 June 2025	CF	(Wales) Callum Osmand	(Scotland) Celtic	1 July 2025	
30 June 2025	GK	(England) Oscar Varney	(England) Coventry City	4 July 2025	
30 June 2025	CDM	(Albania) Adrion Pajaziti	(Croatia) Hajduk Split	8 July 2025	
30 June 2025	CF	(England) Callum McFarlane	(England) Solihull Moors	18 July 2025	
30 June 2025	GK	(England) Luca Ashby-Hammond	(England) Plymouth Argyle	23 July 2025	
30 June 2025	CF	(Brazil) Carlos Vinícius	(Brazil) Grêmio	23 July 2025	
30 June 2025	CB	(Scotland) Connor McAvoy	(England) Wealdstone	1 August 2025	
30 June 2025	LB	(England) Stefan Parkes	(England) Walton & Hersham	9 August 2025	
30 June 2025	CB	(England) Damon Park	(England) Radcliffe	19 August 2025	
30 June 2025	CAM	(England) Imani Lanquedoc	(England) Eastbourne Borough	21 August 2025	
30 June 2025	LW	(Brazil) Willian	(Brazil) Grêmio	5 September 2025	
30 June 2025	CAM	(Wales) Luca Picotto	(England) Brentford	8 September 2025	
30 June 2025	CM	(Australia) Chris Donnell	(Australia) Sydney Olympic	2 October 2025	
30 June 2025	CF	(Finland) Terry Ablade			

=== New contracts ===
Date	Pos.	Player	Contract until	Ref.
First team
30 June 2025	RB	(Netherlands) Kenny Tete	30 June 2028 (Note: Club option to extend by a further year)	
11 July 2025	CB	(Canada) Luc de Fougerolles	30 June 2029	
14 July 2025	CM	(Scotland) Tom Cairney	30 June 2026	
17 July 2025	CM	(England) Joshua King	30 June 2029	
1 October 2025	CF	(Brazil) Rodrigo Muniz	30 June 2030	
23 January 2026	CM	(Scotland) Tom Cairney	30 June 2027	
22 April 2026	LB	(England) Ryan Sessegnon	30 June 2027	
Academy
23 July 2025	LW	(England) Farhaan Ali Wahid	Undisclosed (Note: First professional contact)	
23 July 2025	CF	(England) Tom Wingate	Undisclosed	
24 July 2025	CM	(England) Seth Ridgeon	Undisclosed	
24 July 2025	CB	(England) Charlie Robinson	30 June 2026	
24 July 2025	CF	(England) Terrell Works	30 June 2026	
6 August 2025	CB	(England) Logan Cooke	Undisclosed	
22 September 2025	CF	(England) Aaron Loupalo-Bi	30 June 2028	
13 November 2025	GK	(England) Alfie McNally	30 June 2028	
28 November 2025	RB	(England) Nazim Benchaita	Undisclosed	
15 April 2026	CM	(England) Alfie White	Undisclosed	

== Squad information ==
No.	Player	Nat.	Position(s)	Date of birth (age)	Signed in	Contract ends	Signed from	Transfer fee	Apps.	Goals
Goalkeepers
1	Bernd Leno	(Germany)	GK	4 March 1992 (age 34)	2022	2027	(England) Arsenal	£8M	135	0
23	Benjamin Lecomte	(France)	GK	26 April 1991 (age 35)	2025	2027	(France) Montpellier	£0.5M	3	0
Defenders
2	Kenny Tete	(Netherlands)	RB	9 October 1995 (age 31)	2020	2028	(France) Lyon	£3M	134	5
3	Calvin Bassey	(Nigeria)	CB	31 December 1999 (age 26)	2023	2027	(Netherlands) Ajax	£19.5M	87	4
5	Joachim Andersen (v/c)	(Denmark)	CB	31 May 1996 (age 30)	2024	2029	(England) Crystal Palace	£25M	81	2
15	Jorge Cuenca	(Spain)	CB	17 November 1999 (age 26)	2024	2029	(Spain) Villarreal	£7M	19	0
21	Timothy Castagne	(Belgium)	RB	5 December 1995 (age 30)	2023	2027	(England) Leicester City	£15M	82	2
30	Ryan Sessegnon	(England)	LB	18 May 2000 (age 26)	2024	2027	(England) Tottenham Hotspur	Free	157	31
31	Issa Diop	(Morocco)	CB	9 January 1997 (age 29)	2022	2027	(England) West Ham United	£15M	83	2
33	Antonee Robinson	(United States)	LB	8 August 1997 (age 29)	2020	2028	(England) Wigan Athletic	£2M	195	3
Midfielders
6	Harrison Reed	(England)	DM / CM	27 January 1995 (age 31)	2020	2027	(England) Southampton	£6M	200	3
10	Tom Cairney (c)	(Scotland)	AM / CM	20 January 1991 (age 35)	2015	2027	(England) Blackburn Rovers	£3M	364	47
16	Sander Berge	(Norway)	CM	14 February 1998 (age 28)	2024	2029	(England) Burnley	£20M	55	0
17	Alex Iwobi	(Nigeria)	CM / LW	3 May 1996 (age 30)	2023	2028	(England) Everton	£22M	95	17
20	Saša Lukić	(Serbia)	DM / CM	13 August 1996 (age 30)	2023	2027	(Italy) Torino	£8M	94	3
24	Josh King	(England)	AM	3 January 2007 (age 19)	2024	2029	(England) Youth Academy	N/A	34	1
32	Emile Smith Rowe	(England)	AM / LW	8 July 2000 (age 26)	2024	2029	(England) Arsenal	£27M	60	10
Forwards
7	Raúl Jiménez	(Mexico)	ST	5 May 1991 (age 35)	2023	2026	(England) Wolverhampton Wanderers	£5M	97	27
8	Harry Wilson	(Wales)	RW	22 March 1997 (age 29)	2021	2026	(England) Liverpool	£12M	164	30
9	Rodrigo Muniz	(Brazil)	ST	4 May 2001 (age 25)	2021	2030	(Brazil) Flamengo	£6M	105	27
18	Jonah Kusi-Asare	(Sweden)	ST	4 January 2007 (age 19)	2025	2026	(Germany) Bayern Munich	Loan	5	0
19	Samuel Chukwueze	(Nigeria)	RW	22 May 1999 (age 27)	2025	2026	(Italy) AC Milan	Loan	10	2
22	Kevin	(Brazil)	LW	4 January 2003 (age 23)	2025	2030	(Ukraine) Shakhtar Donetsk	£34.5M	16	0

== Pre-season and friendlies ==
On 6 June, Fulham announced their first pre-season friendly, against Eintracht Frankfurt. A second friendly was confirmed a month later, against Nottingham Forest during a training camp in Portugal.

Win Draw Loss Fixtures

19 July 2025 Friendly	Fulham	4–1	Aberdeen	New Malden
13:00 WEST	Wilson (?); Muniz (?); King (?)	Report		Stadium: Motspur Park Training Ground; Attendance: 0 (behind closed doors)

22 July 2025 Friendly	Fulham	1–0	West Bromwich Albion	New Malden
13:00 WEST	Smith Rowe	Report		Stadium: Motspur Park Training Ground; Attendance: 0 (behind closed doors)

26 July 2025 Friendly	Fulham	3–1	Nottingham Forest	Faro, Portugal
20:00 WEST	Wilson 16', 20'; Pereira 58'		Wood 75'	Stadium: Estádio de São Luís

30 July 2025 Friendly	Fulham	4–2	Al-Ittihad	Faro, Portugal
19:00 WEST	Wilson 7'; Smith Rowe 22'; King 39'; Cuenca 45+1'	Report	Benzema (penalty missed) 68', 69', 74'	Stadium: Estádio de São Luís

2 August 2025 Friendly	Fulham	2–3	Sheffield United	New Malden
15:00 BST	Smith Rowe; Jiménez	Report	Cannon; Barry; O'Hare	Stadium: Motspur Park Training Ground; Attendance: 0 (behind closed doors)
Note: 120-minute match

9 August 2025 Friendly	Fulham	1–0	Eintracht Frankfurt	Fulham
17:00 BST	Jiménez 35'	Report		Stadium: Craven Cottage

== Competitions ==
=== Overall record ===
Competition	First match	Last match	Starting round	Final position	Record							
Competition	First match	Last match	Starting round	Final position	Pld	W	D	L	GF	GA	GD	Win %
Premier League	16 August 2025	24 May 2026	Matchday 1	11th	38	15	7	16	47	51	−4	39.47
FA Cup	10 January 2026	8 March 2026	Third round	Fifth round	3	2	0	1	5	3	+2	66.67
EFL Cup	27 August 2025	17 December 2025	Second round	Quarter-finals	4	2	1	1	5	3	+2	50.00
Total					45	19	8	18	57	57	+0	42.22

Source: Soccerway

=== Premier League ===
==== League table ====
Pos	Team	Pld	W	D	L	GF	GA	GD	Pts
9	Brentford	38	14	11	13	55	52	+3	53
10	Chelsea	38	14	10	14	58	52	+6	52
11	Fulham	38	15	7	16	47	51	−4	52
12	Newcastle United	38	14	7	17	53	55	−2	49
13	Everton	38	13	10	15	47	50	−3	49

Source: Premier League
Rules for classification: 1) Points; 2) Goal difference; 3) Goals scored; 4) If the champions, relegated teams or qualified teams for UEFA competitions cannot be determined by rules 1 to 3, rules 4.1 to 4.3 are applied – 4.1) Points gained in head-to-head record between such teams; 4.2) Away goals scored in head-to-head record between such teams; 4.3) Play-offs

==== Results summary ====
Overall								Home						Away					
Pld	W	D	L	GF	GA	GD	Pts	W	D	L	GF	GA	GD	W	D	L	GF	GA	GD
38	15	7	16	47	51	−4	52	11	2	6	30	20	+10	4	5	10	17	31	−14

Source: Soccerway

==== Results by round ====
Round	1	2	3	4	5	6	7	8	9	10	11	12	13	14	15	16	17	18	19	20	21	22	23	24	25	26	27	28	29	30	31	32	33	34	35	36	37	38
Ground	A	H	A	H	H	A	A	H	A	H	A	H	A	H	H	A	H	A	A	H	H	A	H	A	H	A	A	H	H	A	H	A	A	H	A	H	A	H
Result	D	D	L	W	W	L	L	L	L	W	L	W	W	L	L	W	W	W	D	D	W	L	W	L	L	L	W	W	L	D	W	L	D	W	L	L	D	W
Position	9	13	18	11	8	11	14	15	17	15	15	15	15	15	15	14	13	10	11	11	9	11	7	9	10	12	10	9	10	11	9	12	12	10	11	11	13	11
Points	1	2	2	5	8	8	8	8	8	11	11	14	17	17	17	20	23	26	27	28	31	31	34	34	34	34	37	40	40	41	44	44	45	48	48	48	49	52

Source: Premier League
A = Away; H = Home; W = Win; D = Draw; L = Loss; P = Postponed

==== Matches ====
On 18 June, the Premier League fixtures were released, with Fulham kicking off the season away to Brighton & Hove Albion.

Win Draw Loss Fixtures

16 August 2025 1	Brighton & Hove Albion	1–1	Fulham	Brighton and Hove
15:00 BST	O'Riley 55' (pen.); Mitoma (yellow card) 60'; Kadıoğlu (yellow card) 73'; Gómez (yellow card) 78'	Report	Bassey (yellow card) 31'; Cairney (yellow card) 90+3'; Muniz 90+7', (yellow card) 90+8'	Stadium: Falmer Stadium; Attendance: 31,478; Referee: Sam Barrott

24 August 2025 2	Fulham	1–1	Manchester United	Fulham
16:30 BST	Smith Rowe 73'; Lukić (yellow card) 86'	Report	Fernandes (penalty missed) 38'; Casemiro (yellow card) 39'; Muniz 58' (o.g.)	Stadium: Craven Cottage; Attendance: 27,512; Referee: Chris Kavanagh
Note: Fixture was initially scheduled for 23 August, but was moved for live Sky Sports broadcast.

30 August 2025 3	Chelsea	2–0	Fulham	Fulham
12:30 BST	Caicedo (yellow card) 38'; João Pedro 45+9'; Fernández 56' (pen.); Andrey Santos (yellow card) 90+3'	Report	Iwobi (yellow card) 73'; Lukić (yellow card) 90+6'	Stadium: Stamford Bridge; Attendance: 39,745; Referee: Robert Jones
Note: Fixture was originally scheduled a 15:00 kick-off, but was moved live TNT Sports broadcasting.

13 September 2025 4	Fulham	1–0	Leeds United	Fulham
15:00 BST	Berge (yellow card) 79'; Gudmundsson 90+4' (o.g.)	Report	Stach (yellow card) 11'; Okafor (yellow card) 64'	Stadium: Craven Cottage; Attendance: 27,327; Referee: Craig Pawson

20 September 2025 5	Fulham	3–1	Brentford	Fulham
20:00 BST	Iwobi 38'; Wilson 40'; King (yellow card) 43'; Pinnock 50' (o.g.); Lukić (yellow card) 53'; Leno (yellow card) 81'; Kevin (yellow card) 90+3'	Report	Damsgaard 20'; Collins (yellow card) 69'	Stadium: Craven Cottage; Attendance: 26,113; Referee: Michael Oliver
Note: Fixture was originally scheduled for a 15:00 kick-off, but was moved live Sky Sports broadcasting.

28 September 2025 6	Aston Villa	3–1	Fulham	Birmingham
14:00 BST	Watkins 37'; McGinn (yellow card) 45+5', (goal) 49'; Buendía 51'	Report	Jiménez 3'; King (yellow card) 22'; Lukić (yellow card) 34'; Wilson (yellow card) 45+1'; Bassey (yellow card) 55'	Stadium: Villa Park; Attendance: 40,350; Referee: Andrew Madley
Note: Fixture was originally scheduled for 27 September, but was moved due to Aston Villa's UEFA Europa League involvement on the preceding Thursday.

3 October 2025 7	Bournemouth	3–1	Fulham	Bournemouth
20:00 BST	Semenyo 78', 90+6'; Kluivert 84'	Report	Sessegnon 70'; Diop (yellow card) 76'	Stadium: Dean Court; Attendance: 11,165; Referee: Simon Hooper
Note: Fixture was initially scheduled for 4 October, but was rescheduled for live Sky Sports broadcasting.

18 October 2025 8	Fulham	0–1	Arsenal	Fulham
17:30 BST		Report	Trossard 58'	Stadium: Craven Cottage; Attendance: 27,736; Referee: Anthony Taylor
Note: Fixture was initially scheduled for a 15:00 kick-off, but was rescheduled for live Sky Sports broadcasting.

25 October 2025 9	Newcastle United	2–1	Fulham	Newcastle upon Tyne
15:00 BST	J. Murphy 18'; Bruno Guimarães 90'	Report	Tete (yellow card) 3'; Lukić 56'; Iwobi (yellow card) 66'	Stadium: St James' Park; Attendance: 52,152; Referee: Tony Harrington

1 November 2025 10	Fulham	3–0	Wolverhampton Wanderers	Fulham
15:00 GMT	Sessegnon 9'; Wilson 62'; Mosquera 75' (o.g.); Berge (yellow card) 90+3'	Report	Agbadou (red card) 36'; Toti (yellow card) 40'; Mosquera (yellow card) 74'; S. Bueno (yellow card) 84'	Stadium: Craven Cottage; Attendance: 26,413; Referee: John Brooks

8 November 2025 11	Everton	2–0	Fulham	Liverpool
15:00 GMT	Tarkowski (yellow card) 45+3'; Gueye 45+4'; Iroegbunam (yellow card) 63'; Keane 81'	Report	Lukić (yellow card) 10'; Bassey (yellow card) 45+3'	Stadium: Hill Dickinson Stadium; Attendance: 52,491; Referee: Andrew Madley

22 November 2025 12	Fulham	1–0	Sunderland	Fulham
15:00 GMT	Jiménez 84', (yellow card) 90+5'; Leno (yellow card) 90+3'; Wilson (yellow card) 90+4'	Report	Ballard (yellow card) 32'; Mandava (yellow card) 79'; Hume (yellow card) 88'	Stadium: Craven Cottage; Attendance: 27,560; Referee: Darren England

29 November 2025 13	Tottenham Hotspur	1–2	Fulham	Tottenham
20:00 GMT	Van de Ven (yellow card) 30'; Udogie (yellow card) 49'; Kudus 59'; Muani (yellow card) 90+4'	Report	Tete 4'; Wilson 6'; Jiménez (yellow card) 78'; Leno (yellow card) 90+1'	Stadium: Tottenham Hotspur Stadium; Attendance: 60,546; Referee: Stuart Attwell
Note: Fixture was initially scheduled for a 15:00 kick-off, but was rescheduled for live Sky Sports broadcasting.

2 December 2025 14	Fulham	4–5	Manchester City	Fulham
19:30 GMT	Smith Rowe 45+2'; Iwobi 57'; Chukwueze 72', 78'	Report	Haaland 17'; Reijnders 37'; Foden 44', 48'; Berge 54' (o.g.); Cherki (yellow card) 90+5'	Stadium: Craven Cottage; Attendance: 26,700; Referee: Craig Pawson
Note: Fixture was initially scheduled for 3 December, but was moved for live Sky Sports broadcasting.

7 December 2025 15	Fulham	1–2	Crystal Palace	Fulham
16:30 GMT	Wilson 38'	Report	Nketiah 20'; Guéhi 87'	Stadium: Craven Cottage; Attendance: 27,283; Referee: Sam Barrott
Note: Fixture was initially scheduled for 6 December, but was moved for live Sky Sports broadcasting.

13 December 2025 16	Burnley	2–3	Fulham	Burnley
17:30 GMT	Ugochukwu 21'; Cullen (yellow card) 66'; Sonne 86'	Report	Smith Rowe 9'; Bassey 31'; Andersen (yellow card) 37'; Wilson 58'; Tete (yellow card) 82'	Stadium: Turf Moor; Attendance: 19,739; Referee: Michael Oliver
Note: Fixture was initially scheduled for a 15:00 kick-off, but was moved for live Sky Sports broadcasting.

22 December 2025 17	Fulham	1–0	Nottingham Forest	Fulham
20:00 GMT	Jiménez 45+5' (pen.), (yellow card) 45+7'; Berge (yellow card) 56'; Wilson (yellow card) 77'; Cuenca (yellow card) 82'; Andersen (yellow card) 90+4'	Report	John (yellow card) 45+4'; Murillo (yellow card) 70'; Milenković (yellow card) 83'; Domínguez (yellow card) 90+6'	Stadium: Craven Cottage; Attendance: 27,136; Referee: Anthony Taylor
Note: Fixture was initially scheduled for 20 December, but was moved for live Sky Sports broadcasting.

27 December 2025 18	West Ham United	0–1	Fulham	Stratford
15:00 GMT	Todibo (yellow card) 44'	Report	Andersen (yellow card) 51'; Wilson (yellow card) 54'; Jiménez 85'; King (yellow card) 90+3'	Stadium: London Stadium; Attendance: 62,464; Referee: Chris Kavanagh

1 January 2026 19	Crystal Palace	1–1	Fulham	Selhurst
17:30 GMT	Mateta 39'	Report	Cuenca (yellow card) 19'; Andersen (yellow card) 46'; Smith Rowe (yellow card) 60'; Cairney 80', (yellow card) 81'; Castagne (yellow card) 88'	Stadium: Selhurst Park; Attendance: 25,111; Referee: Tony Harrington
Note: Fixture was initially scheduled for 30 December, but was rescheduled for live Sky Sports broadcasting.

4 January 2026 20	Fulham	2–2	Liverpool	Fulham
15:15 GMT	Wilson 17', (yellow card) 71'; Reed 90+7'	Report	Wirtz 57'; Gakpo 90+4', (yellow card) 90+5'	Stadium: Craven Cottage; Attendance: 27,547; Referee: Craig Pawson
Note: Fixture was initially scheduled for 3 January, but was rescheduled for live Sky Sports broadcasting.

7 January 2026 21	Fulham	2–1	Chelsea	Fulham
19:30 GMT	Cuenca (yellow card) 45+7'; Jiménez 55', (yellow card) 90'; Castagne (yellow card) 78'; Wilson 81'	Report	Cucurella (red card) 22'; Fernández (yellow card) 24'; Adarabioyo (yellow card) 25'; Palmer (yellow card) 25'; Delap 72'	Stadium: Craven Cottage; Attendance: 26,990; Referee: Peter Bankes
Note: Fixture was initially scheduled for a 20:00 kick-off, but was rescheduled for live Sky Sports broadcasting.

17 January 2026 22	Leeds United	1–0	Fulham	Leeds
15:00 GMT	Ampadu (yellow card) 41'; Nmecha 90+1'	Report	Castagne (yellow card) 27'; Lukić (yellow card) 28'; Wilson (yellow card) 56'; Cuenca (yellow card) 87'; Kusi-Asare (yellow card) 90+5'	Stadium: Elland Road; Attendance: 36,300; Referee: Chris Kavanagh

24 January 2026 23	Fulham	2–1	Brighton & Hove Albion	Fulham
15:00 GMT	Berge (yellow card) 66'; Chukwueze 72'; Wilson 90+2'	Report	Ayari 28'; Kostoulas (yellow card) 90+1'	Stadium: Craven Cottage; Attendance: 27,239; Referee: Michael Oliver

1 February 2026 24	Manchester United	3–2	Fulham	Old Trafford
14:00 GMT	Casemiro 19', (yellow card) 64'; Cunha 56'; Maguire (yellow card) 83'; Šeško 90+4'	Report	Andersen (yellow card) 42'; Jiménez 85' (pen.); Kevin 90+1'	Stadium: Old Trafford; Attendance: 73,932; Referee: John Brooks
Note: Fixture was initially scheduled for 31 January, but was rescheduled for live Sky Sports broadcasting.

7 February 2026 25	Fulham	1–2	Everton	Fulham
15:00 GMT	Mykolenko 18' (o.g.); Cuenca (yellow card) 66'	Report	Gueye (yellow card) 18'; Garner (yellow card) 56'; Mykolenko (yellow card) 65'; Dewsbury-Hall 75'; Leno 83' (o.g.); O'Brien (yellow card) 88'; Pickford (yellow card) 90+7'	Stadium: Craven Cottage; Attendance: 27,155; Referee: Stuart Attwell

11 February 2026 26	Manchester City	3–0	Fulham	Manchester
19:30 GMT	Semenyo 24'; O'Reilly 30'; Haaland 39'; Silva (yellow card) 41'; Foden (yellow card) 66'; González (yellow card) 83'	Report	Andersen (yellow card) 31'	Stadium: City of Manchester Stadium; Attendance: 50,717; Referee: Paul Tierney
Note: Fixture was initially scheduled for a 20:00 kick-off, but was rescheduled for live broadcasting.

22 February 2026 27	Sunderland	1–3	Fulham	Sunderland
14:00 GMT	Brobbey (yellow card) 60'; Le Fée 76' (pen.)	Report	Jiménez (yellow card) 41', (goal) 54', 61' (pen.); Iwobi 85'	Stadium: Stadium of Light; Attendance: 47,222; Referee: Craig Pawson
Note: Fixture was initially scheduled for a 20:00 kick-off, but was rescheduled for live broadcasting.

1 March 2026 28	Fulham	2–1	Tottenham Hotspur	Fulham
14:00 GMT	Wilson 7'; Iwobi 34'; Diop (yellow card) 61'; Bassey (yellow card) 66'; Cairney (yellow card) 90+2'	Report	Van de Ven (yellow card) 64'; Richarlison 66', (yellow card) 66'; Porro (yellow card) 90+5'	Stadium: Craven Cottage; Attendance: 27,439; Referee: Thomas Bramall
Note: Fixture was initially scheduled for a 20:00 kick-off, but was rescheduled for live broadcasting.

4 March 2026 29	Fulham	0–1	West Ham United	Fulham
19:30 GMT	Bassey (yellow card) 90+1'; Robinson (yellow card) 90+9'	Report	Fernandes (yellow card) 17'; Wan-Bissaka (yellow card) 41'; Summerville 65'; Kanté (yellow card) 90+9'; Bowen (yellow card) 90+10'	Stadium: Craven Cottage; Attendance: 27,191; Referee: Matt Donohue
Note: Fixture was initially scheduled for a 19:45 kick-off, but was rescheduled for live broadcasting.

15 March 2026 30	Nottingham Forest	0–0	Fulham	West Bridgford
14:00 GMT	Williams (yellow card) 18'; Anderson (yellow card) 45+2'	Report	Berge (yellow card) 32'; Robinson (yellow card) 61'; Andersen (yellow card) 75'	Stadium: City Ground; Attendance: 30,013; Referee: Sam Barrott
Note: Fixture was initially scheduled for 14 March, but was rearranged for Sky Sports broadcasting.

21 March 2026 31	Fulham	3–1	Burnley	Fulham
15:00 GMT	Robinson (yellow card) 55'; King 67'; Wilson 73'; Iwobi (yellow card) 90+2'; Jiménez 90+5' (pen.)	Report	Laurent (yellow card) 37', (red card) 90+3'; Flemming 60'; Ward-Prowse (yellow card) 64'	Stadium: Craven Cottage; Attendance: 27,323; Referee: Chris Kavanagh

11 April 2026 32	Liverpool	2–0	Fulham	Liverpool
17:30 BST	Ngumoha 36'; Salah 40'	Report		Stadium: Anfield; Attendance: 60,401; Referee: Anthony Taylor
Note: Fixture was initially scheduled for a 15:00 Lkick-off, but was pushed back for Sky Sports broadcasting.

18 April 2026 33	Brentford	0–0	Fulham	Brentford
12:30 BST		Report	Lukić (yellow card) 6'	Stadium: Brentford Community Stadium; Attendance: 17,171; Referee: Paul Tierney
Note: Fixture was initially scheduled for a 15:00 kick-off, but was brought forward for Sky Sports broadcasting.

25 April 2026 34	Fulham	1–0	Aston Villa	Fulham
12:30 BST	Sessegnon 43'; Castagne (yellow card) 46'; Wilson (yellow card) 90+1'	Report	Torres (yellow card) 49'; Douglas Luiz (yellow card) 90+4'	Stadium: Craven Cottage; Attendance: 27,606; Referee: Michael Oliver
Note: Fixture was initially scheduled for a 15:00 kick-off, but was brought forward for TNT Sports broadcasting.

2 May 2026 35	Arsenal	3–0	Fulham	Holloway
17:30 BST	Gyökeres 9', 45+4'; Saka 40'	Report	Lukić (yellow card) 23'	Stadium: Emirates Stadium; Attendance: 60,196; Referee: Jarred Gillett
Note: Fixture was initially scheduled for a 15:00 kick-off, but was pushed back for live Sky Sports broadcasting.

9 May 2026 36	Fulham	0–1	Bournemouth	Fulham
15:00 BST	Andersen (red card) 45+7'; Muniz (yellow card) 50'; Lukić (yellow card) 59'; Robinson (yellow card) 77'; King (yellow card) 82'	Report	Christie (red card) 41'; Rayan 53'; Scott (yellow card) 65'; Tavernier (yellow card) 90+5'	Stadium: Craven Cottage; Attendance: 27,626; Referee: Andrew Madley

17 May 2026 37	Wolverhampton Wanderers	1–1	Fulham	Wolverhampton
15:00 BST	Mané 25'; André (yellow card) 90+4'	Report	Robinson 45+3' (pen.)	Stadium: Molineux Stadium; Attendance: 28,709; Referee: Thomas Kirk

24 May 2026 38	Fulham	2–0	Newcastle United	Fulham
16:00 BST	Diop 20'; Cairney 80'; Robinson (yellow card) 89'; Cuenca (yellow card) 90+8'	Report	Bruno Guimarães (yellow card) 64'; Wissa (yellow card) 70'	Stadium: Craven Cottage; Attendance: 27,442; Referee: Robert Jones

=== FA Cup ===
Fulham entered the FA Cup in the third round, and were drawn at home to Middlesbrough. They were then drawn away to Stoke City in the fourth round, and at home to Southampton in the fifth round.

Win Draw Loss Fixtures

10 January 2026 Third round	Fulham	3–1	Middlesbrough	Fulham
15:00 GMT	Wilson 60'; Cuenca (yellow card) 72'; Smith Rowe 77'; Kevin 90+3'	Report	Gilbert (yellow card) 26'; Hackney 30'; Burgzorg (yellow card) 68'	Stadium: Craven Cottage; Attendance: 20,675; Referee: Lewis Smith

15 February 2026 Fourth round	Stoke City	1–2	Fulham	Stoke-on-Trent
14:00 GMT	Bae Jun-ho 19', (yellow card) 74'	Report	Castagne (yellow card) 45+1'; Kevin 55'; Diop (yellow card) 74'; Reed 84'	Stadium: Bet365 Stadium; Attendance: 14,871; Referee: Josh Smith

8 March 2026 Fifth round	Fulham	0–1	Southampton	Fulham
12:00 GMT	Cuenca (yellow card) 62'; Chukwueze (yellow card) 90+8'	Report	Downes (yellow card) 73'; Stewart 90+1' (pen.); Azaz (yellow card) 90+3'; Matsuki (yellow card) 90+6'	Stadium: Craven Cottage; Attendance: 21,974; Referee: Jarred Gillett
Note: Broadcast live on TNT Sports.

=== EFL Cup ===
Fulham entered the EFL Cup in the second round, and were drawn at home to Bristol City. They were then drawn at home to Cambridge United in the third round, away to Wycombe Wanderers in the fourth round, and away to Newcastle United in the quarter-finals.

Win Draw Loss Fixtures

27 August 2025 Second round	Fulham	2–0	Bristol City	Fulham
19:45 BST	Tanner 8' (o.g.); Jiménez 21'; Castagne (yellow card) 39'	Report		Stadium: Craven Cottage; Attendance: 11,749; Referee: Lewis Smith

23 September 2025 Third round	Fulham	1–0	Cambridge United	Fulham
19:45 BST	Reed (yellow card) 44'; Smith Rowe 66'	Report	Smith (yellow card) 45+2'	Stadium: Craven Cottage; Attendance: 16,254; Referee: Ruebyn Ricardo

28 October 2025 Fourth round	Wycombe Wanderers	1–1 (4–5 p)	Fulham	High Wycombe
19:45 GMT	Woodrow 4'; Grimmer (yellow card) 45+1'; McNeilly (yellow card) 90'	Report	King 48', (yellow card) 60'	Stadium: Adams Park; Attendance: 9,709; Referee: Bobby Madley
	Penalties
	Henderson (penalty missed); Leahy (penalty scored); Boyd-Munce (penalty scored); Hagelskjær (penalty scored); Bell (penalty scored); Onyedinma (penalty missed); McNeilly (penalty missed)		(penalty scored) Lukić; (penalty scored) Traoré; (penalty scored) Kevin; (penalty scored) Iwobi; (penalty missed) Sessegnon; (penalty missed) Kusi-Asare; (penalty scored) Diop

17 December 2025 Quarter-finals	Newcastle United	2–1	Fulham	Newcastle upon Tyne
20:15 GMT	Wissa 10'; Schär (yellow card) 23'; Woltemade (yellow card) 82'; Miley 90+2'	Report	Lukić 16', (yellow card) 29'	Stadium: St James' Park; Attendance: 51,301; Referee: Darren England

== Statistics ==
=== Appearances and goals ===
As of match played 24 May 2026

Players with no appearances are not included on the list, italics indicate a loaned in player

No.	Pos	Nat	Player	Total		Premier League		FA Cup		EFL Cup	
No.	Pos	Nat	Player	Apps	Goals	Apps	Goals	Apps	Goals	Apps	Goals
1	GK	(Germany) GER	Bernd Leno	38	0	38	0	0	0	0	0
2	DF	(Netherlands) NED	Kenny Tete	23	1	21+1	1	0	0	1	0
3	DF	(Nigeria) NGR	Calvin Bassey	32	1	28+2	1	0	0	1+1	0
5	DF	(Denmark) DEN	Joachim Andersen	35	0	33	0	1	0	1	0
6	MF	(England) ENG	Harrison Reed	14	2	1+6	1	3	1	3+1	0
7	FW	(Mexico) MEX	Raúl Jiménez	43	10	27+9	9	0+3	0	4	1
8	FW	(Wales) WAL	Harry Wilson	41	11	32+4	10	0+2	1	2+1	0
9	FW	(Brazil) BRA	Rodrigo Muniz	25	1	10+11	1	2	0	0+2	0
10	MF	(Scotland) SCO	Tom Cairney	29	2	6+18	2	1+1	0	3	0
14	FW	(Norway) NOR	Oscar Bobb	16	0	6+8	0	2	0	0	0
15	DF	(Spain) ESP	Jorge Cuenca	22	0	11+4	0	3	0	4	0
16	MF	(Norway) NOR	Sander Berge	39	0	34+1	0	0+2	0	1+1	0
17	FW	(Nigeria) NGR	Alex Iwobi	33	4	29	4	1+1	0	0+2	0
18	FW	(Sweden) SWE	Jonah Kusi-Asare	10	0	0+7	0	1	0	0+2	0
19	FW	(Nigeria) NGR	Samuel Chukwueze	25	3	10+13	3	1	0	0+1	0
20	MF	(Serbia) SRB	Saša Lukić	30	2	20+6	1	1	0	1+2	1
21	DF	(Belgium) BEL	Timothy Castagne	36	0	20+10	0	3	0	3	0
22	FW	(Brazil) BRA	Kevin	31	3	9+17	1	2	2	3	0
23	GK	(France) FRA	Benjamin Lecomte	7	0	0	0	3	0	4	0
24	MF	(England) ENG	Josh King	38	2	15+17	1	1+1	0	1+3	1
30	DF	(England) ENG	Ryan Sessegnon	31	3	20+7	3	2	0	1+1	0
31	DF	(Morocco) MAR	Issa Diop	18	1	8+5	1	2	0	3	0
32	MF	(England) ENG	Emile Smith Rowe	43	5	22+15	3	2+1	1	3	1
33	DF	(United States) USA	Antonee Robinson	26	1	17+5	1	1+1	0	2	0
Player(s) who featured but departed the club during the season:
11	FW	(Spain) ESP	Adama Traoré	20	0	1+14	0	1	0	3+1	0

=== Top scorers ===
As of match played 24 May 2026

Includes all competitive matches. The list is sorted by squad number when total goals are equal.

Rank	No.	Nat.	Player	Premier League	FA Cup	EFL Cup	Total
1	8	(Wales)	Harry Wilson	10	1	0	11
2	7	(Mexico)	Raúl Jiménez	9	0	1	10
3	32	(England)	Emile Smith Rowe	3	1	1	5
4	17	(Nigeria)	Alex Iwobi	4	0	0	4
5	19	(Nigeria)	Samuel Chukwueze	3	0	0	3
5	22	(Brazil)	Kevin	1	2	0	3
5	30	(England)	Ryan Sessegnon	3	0	0	3
8	6	(England)	Harrison Reed	1	1	0	2
8	10	(Scotland)	Tom Cairney	2	0	0	2
8	20	(Serbia)	Saša Lukić	1	0	1	2
8	24	(England)	Josh King	1	0	1	2
12	2	(Netherlands)	Kenny Tete	1	0	0	1
12	3	(Nigeria)	Calvin Bassey	1	0	0	1
12	9	(Brazil)	Rodrigo Muniz	1	0	0	1
12	31	(Morocco)	Issa Diop	1	0	0	1
12	33	(United States)	Antonee Robinson	1	0	0	1
Own goals				4	0	1	5
Totals				47	5	5	57

=== Disciplinary record ===
As of match played 24 May 2026

Rank	No.	Pos.	Player	Premier League			FA Cup			EFL Cup			Total		
Rank	No.	Pos.	Player	Yellow card	(yellow card) (yellow-red card)	Red card	Yellow card	(yellow card) (yellow-red card)	Red card	Yellow card	(yellow card) (yellow-red card)	Red card	Yellow card	(yellow card) (yellow-red card)	Red card
1	20	MF	(Serbia) Saša Lukić	9	0	0	0	0	0	1	0	0	10	0	0
2	15	DF	(Spain) Jorge Cuenca	6	0	0	2	0	0	0	0	0	8	0	0
3	5	DF	(Denmark) Joachim Andersen	7	0	1	0	0	0	0	0	0	7	0	1
4	8	FW	(Wales) Harry Wilson	7	0	0	0	0	0	0	0	0	7	0	0
5	21	DF	(Belgium) Timothy Castagne	4	0	0	1	0	0	1	0	0	6	0	0
6	3	DF	(Nigeria) Calvin Bassey	5	0	0	0	0	0	0	0	0	5	0	0
6	7	FW	(Mexico) Raúl Jiménez	5	0	0	0	0	0	0	0	0	5	0	0
6	16	MF	(Norway) Sander Berge	5	0	0	0	0	0	0	0	0	5	0	0
6	24	MF	(England) Josh King	4	0	0	0	0	0	1	0	0	5	0	0
10	33	DF	(United States) Antonee Robinson	4	0	0	0	0	0	0	0	0	4	0	0
11	1	GK	(Germany) Bernd Leno	3	0	0	0	0	0	0	0	0	3	0	0
11	10	MF	(Scotland) Tom Cairney	3	0	0	0	0	0	0	0	0	3	0	0
11	17	FW	(Nigeria) Alex Iwobi	3	0	0	0	0	0	0	0	0	3	0	0
11	31	DF	(Morocco) Issa Diop	2	0	0	1	0	0	0	0	0	3	0	0
15	2	DF	(Netherlands) Kenny Tete	2	0	0	0	0	0	0	0	0	2	0	0
15	9	FW	(Brazil) Rodrigo Muniz	2	0	0	0	0	0	0	0	0	2	0	0
17	6	MF	(England) Harrison Reed	0	0	0	0	0	0	1	0	0	1	0	0
17	18	FW	(Sweden) Jonah Kusi-Asare	1	0	0	0	0	0	0	0	0	1	0	0
17	19	FW	(Nigeria) Samuel Chukwueze	0	0	0	1	0	0	0	0	0	1	0	0
17	22	FW	(Brazil) Kevin	1	0	0	0	0	0	0	0	0	1	0	0
Totals				74	0	1	5	0	0	4	0	0	83	0	1
