= Matt Dibley-Dias =

New Zealand footballer (born 2003)

- Dibley-Dias playing for Newport County

Personal information
- Full name: Matthew Max Dibley-Dias
- Date of birth: 29 October 2003 (age 23)
- Place of birth: Lower Hutt, New Zealand
- Height: 6 ft 0 in (1.83 m)
- Position: Defensive midfielder

Team information
- Current team: Newport County (on loan from Fulham)
- Number: 24

Youth career
- 2008–2011: West Ham United
- 2011–2016: Brentford
- 2016–2024: Fulham

Senior career*
Years	Team	Apps	(Gls)
2024–	Fulham	0	(0)
2024–2025	→ Northampton Town (loan)	2	(0)
2025–2026	→ Chesterfield (loan)	4	(0)
2026–	→ Braintree Town (loan)	0	(0)
2026–	→ Newport County (loan)	12	(0)
- * Club domestic league appearances and goals as of 14:53, 21 November 2026 (UTC)

Matthew Max Dibley-Dias (born 29 October 2003) is a New Zealand professional footballer who plays as a defensive midfielder for EFL League Two club Newport County, on loan from Premier League club Fulham.

== Early life and family ==
Dibley-Dias was born in Lower Hutt, New Zealand to a Brazilian father and a New Zealand mother. He moved to England with his family at a young age. He is the grandson of Brazilian footballer Manoelzinho, and is eligible to represent Portugal and Brazil internationally through his father, England and New Zealand through his mother.

== Club career ==
Dibley-Dias has been described as "in strong form for Fulham’s U-21 side and as "being touted as a first-team player in waiting". He mainly operates as a midfielder and is known for his long-shooting ability.

He joined the youth academy of English Premier League side Fulham at the age of fourteen, and signed a three-year professional contract with the club in September 2021. In 2023 he signed a contract extension to 2027. He received the Johnny Haynes academy player of the year award for the 2022/23 season. He has appeared on Fulham's bench four times, including at the end of their 2022–23 Premier League season and for their 2023–24 season opener.

In July 2024, Dibley-Dias joined League One side Northampton Town on a season-long loan deal.

In July 2025, Dibley-Dias joined League Two side Chesterfield on a season-long loan deal.

On 25 February 2026, following the premature end to his loan at Chesterfield, Dibley-Dias joined National League side, Braintree Town on loan for the remainder of the 2025–26 campaign.

On 26 August 2026 Dibley-Dias joined EFL League Two club Newport County on loan until January 2027. He made his Newport debut on 29 August 2026 in the 2-2 League Two draw against Tranmere Rovers.

== International career ==
Dibley-Dias accepted a call-up to play in friendly matches on behalf of the All Whites in October 2023, but was unable to play due to a hamstring injury. All Whites coach Darren Bazeley said the injury was a "real shame". The New Zealand Herald noted that Dibley-Dias "has been pursued by Bazeley and New Zealand Football for a long time". He had previously rejected an offer to play for New Zealand at the 2023 FIFA U-20 World Cup due to opportunities with Fulham.

== Career statistics ==
As of match played 30 August 2025

Appearances and goals by club, season and competition
Club	Season	League			FA Cup		EFL Cup		Other		Total	
Club	Season	Division	Apps	Goals	Apps	Goals	Apps	Goals	Apps	Goals	Apps	Goals
Fulham U21	2023–24	—			—		—		2 (Note: Appearances in EFL Trophy)	0	2	0
Fulham	2024–25	Premier League	0	0	0	0	—		—		0	0
Fulham	2025–26	Premier League	0	0	0	0	—		—		0	0
Fulham	Total		0	0	0	0	—		—		0	0
Northampton Town (loan)	2024–25	League One	2	0	0	0	1	0	0	0	3	0
Chesterfield (loan)	2025–26	League Two	4	0	0	0	1	0	0	0	5	0
Braintree Town (loan)	2025–26	National League	0	0	—		—		—		0	0
Career total			6	0	0	0	2	0	2	0	10	0

== Honours ==
Fulham U21

- Premier League Cup Champion : 2023–2024

Fulham U23

- Premier League Division 2 Champion : 2021-2022

Fulham U18

- Premier League South Division Champion: 2020-2021
- Premier League U18 Runner-up: 2020-2021
- Premier League Cup U18 Runner-up: 2021-2022

Individual

- Johnny Haynes Trophy : 2022–2023
