= Antonee Robinson =

American professional soccer player (born 1997)

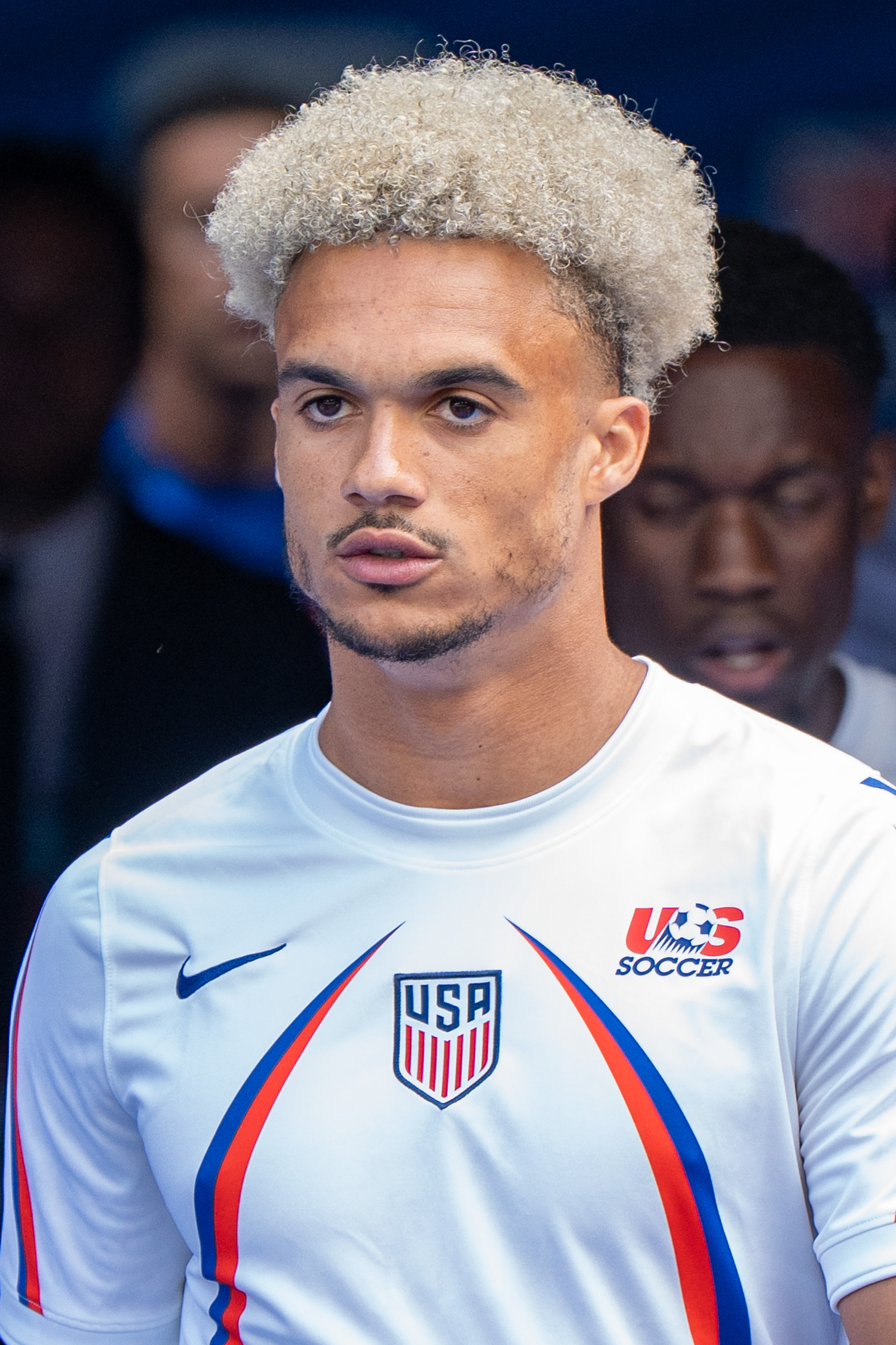
- Robinson with the United States in 2026

Personal information
- Full name: Antonee Robinson
- Date of birth: August 8, 1997 (age 29)
- Place of birth: Milton Keynes, England
- Height: 6 ft 0 in (1.83 m)
- Position: Left-back

Team information
- Current team: Fulham
- Number: 33

Youth career
- 2008–2015: Everton

Senior career*
Years	Team	Apps	(Gls)
2015–2019	Everton	0	(0)
2017–2018	→ Bolton Wanderers (loan)	30	(0)
2018–2019	→ Wigan Athletic (loan)	26	(0)
2019–2020	Wigan Athletic	38	(1)
2020–	Fulham	202	(3)

International career^{‡}
2014	United States U18	1	(0)
2019	United States U23	2	(0)
2018–	United States	64	(5)
Medal record
Representing United States
Men's soccer
CONCACAF Nations League
Winner	2021 United States
Winner	2023 United States
Winner	2024 United States
- * Club domestic league appearances and goals as of November 1, 2026 ‡ National team caps and goals as of November 17, 2026

Antonee Robinson (born August 8, 1997) is a professional soccer player who plays as a left-back for Premier League club Fulham. Born in England, he represents the United States national team.

Previously a youth player with Everton, he went on loan spells to several EFL Championship clubs until signing with Premier League club Fulham in 2020 for £2 million. Following relegation after his first season, he won the 2021–22 EFL Championship and was listed on the 2021–22 Team of the Season. He won the 2023–24 Fulham Player of the Season award.

Robinson represented the United States across several youth levels and made his debut for the senior team in May 2018. He won the U.S. Player of the Year award for 2024.

== Early life ==
Antonee Robinson was born in Milton Keynes, England on August 8, 1997, to father Marlon, who had emigrated to the United States, settling in White Plains, New York, and later naturalizing as a US citizen. Robinson was raised in Liverpool.

== Youth career ==
Robinson came through Everton's academy, having been with the academy since the age of 11. In June 2013, he signed a scholarship with the club, becoming a full-time player.

== Club career ==
=== Everton ===
While with Everton's U18 side, Robinson suffered injuries that saw him sidelined most of the time. He appeared for the U21 side toward the end of the 2014–15 season. As a result, he was awarded the club's Under-18 Players' Player of the Season. At the end of the 2014–15 season, he signed his first professional contract with the club after being offered a new contract.

However, Robinson spent most of the 2015–16 season sidelined by torn cartilage under his kneecap, resulting in knee surgery. Despite this, he signed a one-year contract extension on July 15, 2016. Robinson then played all three matches in the EFL Trophy, which saw Everton U23s eliminated in the Group stage. He also became a regular for the U23 side. At the end of the 2016–17 season, Robinson signed a two-year contract extension with the club.

==== Loan to Bolton Wanderers ====
On August 4, 2017, it was announced that Antonee Robinson had signed on loan with Bolton Wanderers until January 2018.

Five days after joining the club, on August 9, 2017, he made his debut in a 2–1 League Cup win at Crewe Alexandra. Two weeks later, on August 22, 2017, he set up a goal for Jem Karacan to score the club's third goal in a 3–2 win over Sheffield Wednesday in the League Cup. He made his league debut for the side on September 9, 2017, in a 3–0 loss against Middlesbrough, playing the full 90 minutes. Robinson then established himself in the left-back position, beating out competition from Andrew Taylor. It was announced on January 5, 2018, that Robinson had agreed to stay at Bolton for the remainder of the season.

=== Wigan Athletic ===
On July 15, 2019, Robinson joined Wigan Athletic on a permanent three-year contract. He made his debut for Wigan against Rotherham United and scored his first goal for the club in a 2–2 draw at Millwall on November 26, 2019.

After impressing for Wigan in the EFL Championship as one of the league's top left backs, Robinson was set to sign with Serie A side AC Milan for US$13 million before the transfer deadline of January 31, 2020. However, the deal fell through when Robinson's medical examination at Milan revealed a heart rhythm irregularity for which further testing could not be completed before the deadline, and for which he would undergo an ablation procedure as treatment.

=== Fulham ===
Following Wigan's relegation from the Championship, Robinson moved to Premier League club Fulham on August 20, 2020, for £2 million.

==== 2020–23: Development ====
He made his debut for the club in a league cup game against Ipswich Town on September 16, 2020, in a Fulham win. He then played in the next round on September 23 against Sheffield Wednesday in a 2–0 win. He played in the 3–0 loss to Brentford in the league cup on October 1. He made his Premier League debut on October 4, 2020, against Wolverhampton.

He scored his first goal for the club in an EFL Cup tie against Birmingham City on August 24, 2021. Robinson was instrumental of Fulham winning the 2021–22 Championship and its promotion back to the Premier League, featuring in 36 league games and scoring 3 goals. He was included on the EFL Championship Team of the Season.

==== 2023–24: Fulham Player of the Season ====
In July 2023, he signed a new contract with Fulham until 2028.

On December 3, 2023, Robinson made 13 interceptions in the 3–4 defeat to Liverpool, the most in a Premier League match since 2009 and was widely praised for his performances. In the same game, he became the first American to record 3 consecutive assists in the Premier League. On December 20 in the 2023–24 EFL Cup quarter-final against Everton, Robinson forced an own-goal to get his side up 1–0 in the eventual 1–1 (7–6 penalties) win, helping his club to its first ever EFL semi-final appearance.

Robinson was awarded the 2023–24 Fulham Player of the Season award. Considered as one of the Premier League's best left-backs of the season, he finished the 2023–24 season with 37 league appearances and as the player with most interceptions in the Premier League in 81 occasions, 15 more than the second highest.

==== 2024–25 ====
On August 24, 2024, he assisted Alex Iwobi in the 2–1 win over Leicester City. During the following match on August 31, he assisted Adama Traoré in the 1–1 draw against Ipswich Town. On November 4, 2024, he assisted Harry Wilson in the 2–1 win over Brentford. On December 14, Robinson recorded two assists in the 2–2 draw against Liverpool, which accounted for his fifth and sixth assists of the season. On December 29 against Bournemouth he recorded his seventh assist, making him the third-highest assist leader of the 2024–25 Premier League at the year's end. On January 14, 2025, he assisted both of Fulham's goals in the 2–3 defeat to West Ham United. He earned his tenth assist of the season in the 2–1 victory over Newcastle United on February 1, only behind forward Mohamed Salah for the most in the league.

On March 2, he captained Fulham and scored the winning penalty shoot-out (4–3) to eliminate Manchester United in the 2024–25 FA Cup Fifth round, advancing to the quarter-finals.

He registered 10 assists in the Premier League that season, the most of any defender.

== International career ==
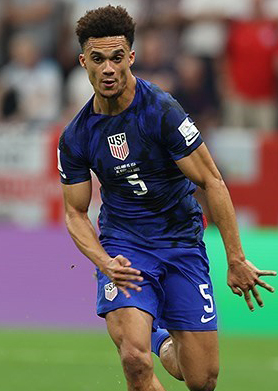
Robinson with the United States at the 2022 FIFA World Cup

Robinson was eligible for both England and the United States. He was born in Milton Keynes and raised in Liverpool, England. His father was born in England but raised in White Plains, New York, and gained American citizenship. Robinson is also of Jamaican descent through his paternal grandparents.

Robinson was first capped at under-18 level with the United States. He was also called into the United States under-20 side, although was not capped. In March 2018, Robinson was invited to both the United States senior and England under-21 camps, and accepted the United States senior call for a friendly against Paraguay in which he was named to the bench. He made his United States senior debut on May 28, 2018, playing the full 90 minutes in a 3–0 friendly win against Bolivia and recording an assist.

On May 26, 2026, Robinson was selected in the 26-man squad for the 2026 FIFA World Cup.

== Style of play ==
Nicknamed Jedi, Robinson is known for his pace, work rate, and offensive ability.

== Personal life ==
Robinson is engaged to Darcy Myers, and the couple has two children.

Robinson has used the nickname “Jedi” from early childhood as a reference to his love for the Star Wars franchise.

== Career statistics ==
=== Club ===
As of match played October 31, 2026

Appearances and goals by club, season and competition
Club	Season	League			National cup (Note: Includes FA Cup)		League cup (Note: Includes EFL Cup)		Continental		Other		Total	
Club	Season	Division	Apps	Goals	Apps	Goals	Apps	Goals	Apps	Goals	Apps	Goals	Apps	Goals
Everton	2015–16	Premier League	0	0	0	0	0	0	—		—		0	0
Everton U23s	2016–17	—			—		—		—		3 (Note: Appearances in EFL Trophy)	0	3	0
Bolton Wanderers (loan)	2017–18	Championship	30	0	1	0	3	0	—		—		34	0
Wigan Athletic (loan)	2018–19	Championship	26	0	0	0	0	0	—		—		26	0
Wigan Athletic	2019–20	Championship	38	1	1	0	0	0	—		—		39	1
Fulham	2020–21	Premier League	28	0	1	0	3	0	—		—		32	0
Fulham	2021–22	Championship	36	2	0	0	1	1	—		—		37	3
Fulham	2022–23	Premier League	35	0	3	0	0	0	—		—		38	0
Fulham	2023–24	Premier League	37	0	2	0	5	0	—		—		44	0
Fulham	2024–25	Premier League	36	0	2	0	0	0	—		—		38	0
Fulham	2025–26	Premier League	22	1	2	0	2	0	—		—		26	1
Fulham	2026–27	Premier League	8	0	0	0	1	0	—		—		9	0
Fulham	Total		202	3	10	0	12	1	—		—		224	4
Career total			296	4	12	0	15	1	0	0	3	0	326	5

=== International ===
As of match played November 17, 2026

Appearances and goals by national team and year
National team	Year	Apps	Goals
United States	2018	6	0
United States	2019	1	0
United States	2020	1	0
United States	2021	11	1
United States	2022	14	1
United States	2023	6	2
United States	2024	11	0
United States	2025	0	0
United States	2026	14	1
Total		64	5

Scores and results list United States' goal tally first.

List of international goals scored by Antonee Robinson
No.	Date	Venue	Cap	Opponent	Score	Result	Competition
1	September 8, 2021	Estadio Olímpico Metropolitano, San Pedro Sula, Honduras	15	Honduras	1–1	4–1	2022 FIFA World Cup qualification
2	January 27, 2022	Lower.com Field, Columbus, United States	20	El Salvador	1–0	1–0	2022 FIFA World Cup qualification
3	November 16, 2023	Q2 Stadium, Austin, United States	38	Trinidad and Tobago	2–0	3–0	2023–24 CONCACAF Nations League A
4	November 20, 2023	Hasely Crawford Stadium, Port of Spain, Trinidad and Tobago	39	Trinidad and Tobago	1–0	1–2	2023–24 CONCACAF Nations League A
5	June 6, 2026	Soldier Field, Chicago, United States	54	Germany	1–1	1–2	Friendly

== Honors ==
Fulham

- EFL Championship: 2021–22

United States

- CONCACAF Nations League: 2019–20, 2022–23, 2023–24

Individual

- EFL Championship Team of the Season: 2021–22 Championship
- Fulham Player of the Season: 2023–24
- U.S. Soccer Player of the Year: 2024
- CONCACAF Nations League Finals Best XI: 2024
- IFFHS Men's CONCACAF Team of the Year: 2025
