= 2024–25 Fulham F.C. season =

127th season in existence of Fulham FC

Fulham
2024–25 season
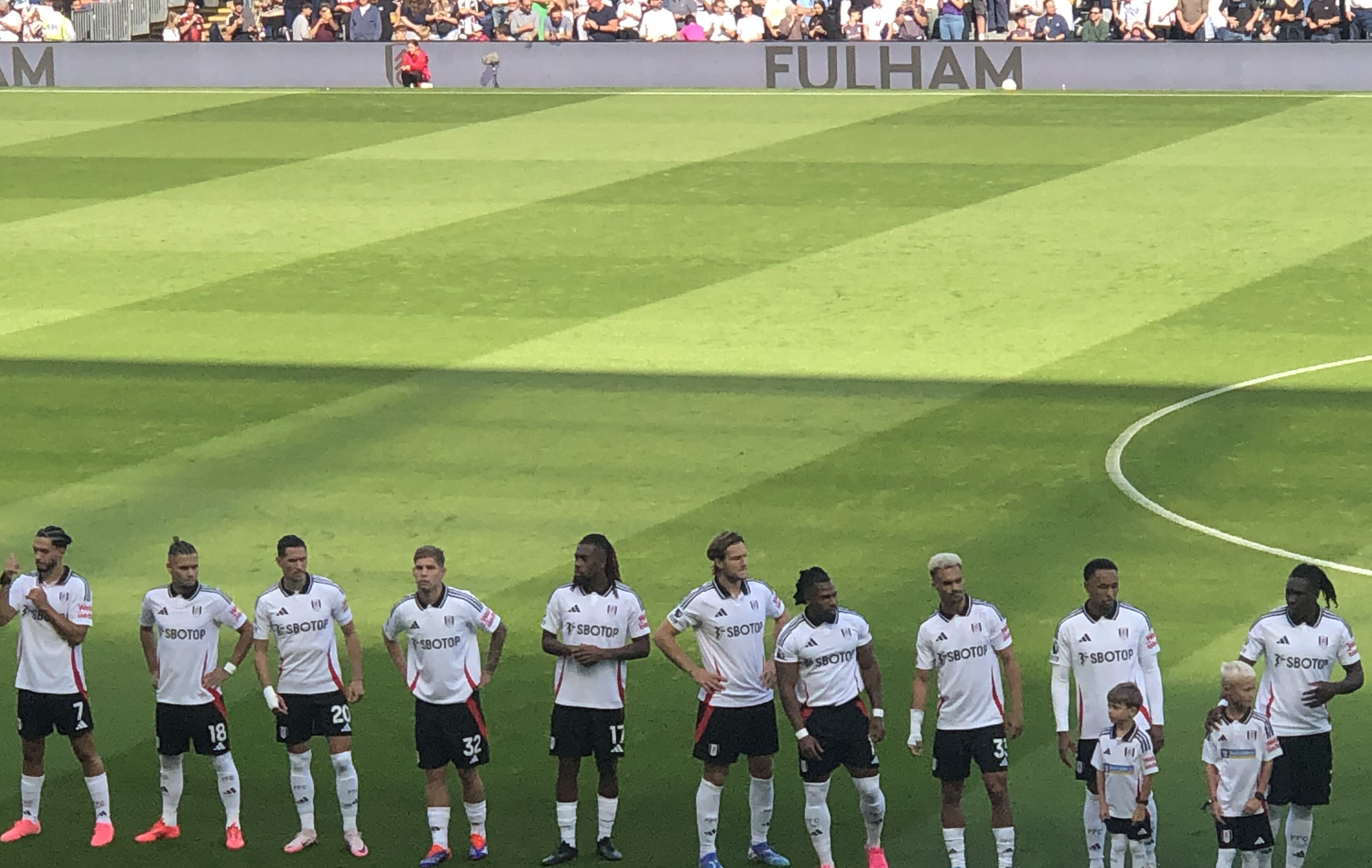
- Fulham’s starting eleven prior to the match against West Ham United on 14 September 2024.
- Owner: Shahid Khan
- Chairman: Shahid Khan
- Manager: Marco Silva
- Stadium: Craven Cottage
- Premier League: 11th
- FA Cup: Quarter-finals
- EFL Cup: Third round
- Top goalscorer: League: Raúl Jiménez (12); All: Raúl Jiménez (14)
- Highest home attendance: 27,770 vs Liverpool (6 April 2025, Premier League)
- Lowest home attendance: 15,981 vs Watford (9 January 2025, FA Cup)
- Average home league attendance: 26,592
- Biggest win: 4–1 vs Watford (9 January 2025, FA Cup)
- Biggest defeat: 1–4 vs Wolverhampton Wanderers (23 November 2024, Premier League); 0–3 vs Crystal Palace (29 March 2025, FA Cup)
Home colours	Away colours	Third colours

The 2024–25 season was the 127th season in the history of Fulham Football Club, and the club's third consecutive season in the Premier League. In addition to the domestic league, the club also participated in the FA Cup and the EFL Cup.

== Transfers ==
=== In ===
Date	Pos.	Player	From	Fee	Ref.
26 July 2024	LM	(England) Ryan Sessegnon	(England) Tottenham Hotspur	Free	
2 August 2024	AM	(England) Emile Smith Rowe	(England) Arsenal	£27,000,000	
3 August 2024	CB	(Spain) Jorge Cuenca	(Spain) Villarreal	£7,000,000	
22 August 2024	DM	(Norway) Sander Berge	(England) Burnley	£20,000,000 (Note: plus £5,000,000 in add-ons)	
23 August 2024	CB	(Denmark) Joachim Andersen	(England) Crystal Palace	£25,000,000 (Note: plus £5,000,000 in add-ons)	
4 February 2025	CM	(England) Seth Chingwaro	(England) Manchester City	Free	
6 February 2025	LW	(Brazil) Willian	Free agent	Free	
13 February 2025	RW	(Scotland) Brodie Dair	(Scotland) St Johnstone	Undisclosed (Note: Initially signed for the Under 18's)	

Total expenditure: ▼£84,000,000 (excluding add-ons, bonuses and undisclosed figures)

=== Out ===
Date	Pos.	Player	To	Fee	Ref.
11 July 2024	DM	(Portugal) João Palhinha	(Germany) Bayern Munich	£42,300,000 (Note: plus £4,200,000 in add-ons)	
7 August 2024	CB	(United States) Tim Ream	(United States) Charlotte FC	Free	
8 August 2024	CF	(Scotland) Kieron Bowie	(Scotland) Hibernian	£600,000	
30 August 2024	CB	(Scotland) Ibane Bowat	(England) Portsmouth	£500,000	
30 August 2024	RB	(Switzerland) Kevin Mbabu	(Denmark) Midtjylland	Free	
30 August 2024	CF	(England) Jay Stansfield	(England) Birmingham City	£10,000,000	
30 August 2024	CB	(England) Samuel Tabares	(England) Southampton	Compensation	
7 February 2025	AM	(Switzerland) Kristian Šekularac	(Hungary) Fehérvár	Undisclosed	

Total income: ▲£53,400,000 (excluding add-ons, bonuses and undisclosed figures)

=== Loaned in ===
Date	Pos.	Player	From	Date until	Ref.
30 August 2024	LW	(England) Reiss Nelson	(England) Arsenal	End of Season	

=== Loaned out ===
Date	Pos.	Player	To	Date until	Ref.
26 July 2024	CM	(New Zealand) Matt Dibley-Dias	(England) Northampton Town	8 January 2025 (Note: On 8 January, Dibley-Dias was recalled from his loan at Northampton)	
4 August 2024	AM	(Wales) Luke Harris	(England) Birmingham City	End of Season	
5 August 2024	RB	(Colombia) Devan Tanton	(England) Chesterfield	10 January 2025 (Note: On 10 January, Tanton was recalled from his loan at Chesterfield)	
12 August 2024	CF	(England) Olly Sanderson	(England) Bradford City	9 January 2025 (Note: On 9 January, Sanderson was recalled from his loan at Bradford)	
15 August 2024	CB	(England) Harvey Araujo	(England) Chesterfield	End of Season	
23 August 2024	CF	(Finland) Terry Ablade	(Scotland) Partick Thistle	End of Season	
29 August 2024	RW	(Republic of Ireland) Tom Olyott	(England) Walton & Hersham	End of Season	
30 August 2024	GK	(England) Luca Ashby-Hammond	(England) Gillingham	17 January 2025 (Note: On 17 January, Ashby-Hammond was recalled from his loan at Gillingham)	
30 August 2024	CB	(Scotland) Connor McAvoy	(Scotland) Ayr United	21 January 2025 (Note: On 21 January, McAvoy was recalled from his loan at Ayr and subsequently joined Wealdstone on loan)	
30 August 2024	CF	(England) Callum McFarlane	(England) Wealdstone	1 January 2025	
5 September 2024	CM	(Albania) Adrion Pajaziti	(Croatia) Gorica	End of Season	
16 January 2025	CF	(England) Olly Sanderson	(England) Harrogate Town	End of Season	
21 January 2025	CB	(Scotland) Connor McAvoy	(England) Wealdstone	End of Season	
31 January 2025	CF	(England) Aaron Loupalo-Bi	(England) Dagenham & Redbridge	End of Season	

=== Released / Out of contract ===
Date	Pos.	Player	Subsequent club	Join date	Ref.
30 June 2024	CB	(England) Tosin Adarabioyo	(England) Chelsea	1 July 2024	
30 June 2024	RW	(Jamaica) Bobby Decordova-Reid	(England) Leicester City	6 July 2024	
30 June 2024	DM	(Cyprus) Georgios Okkas	(Portugal) Rio Ave	9 July 2024	
30 June 2024	CM	(Australia) Tyrese Francois	(England) Wigan Athletic	19 July 2024	
30 June 2024	GK	(England) George Wickens	(England) Lincoln City	20 July 2024	
30 June 2024	GK	(Slovakia) Marek Rodák	(Saudi Arabia) Al-Ettifaq	25 July 2024	
30 June 2024	AM	(England) Ma'kel Bogle-Campbell	(England) Peterborough United	9 August 2024	
30 June 2024	CB	(Netherlands) Terence Kongolo	(Netherlands) NAC Breda	2 September 2024	
30 June 2024	CB	(England) Caelan Avenell	(England) Brentford	19 September 2024	
30 June 2024	RB	(England) Luciano D'Auria-Henry	(England) Farnborough	23 November 2024	
30 June 2024	GK	(England) Monty Conway			
18 August 2024	AM	(Brazil) Willian	(Greece) Olympiacos	2 September 2024	

== Pre-season and friendlies ==
On May 23, Fulham announced their first pre-season friendly, against German side 1899 Hoffenheim. On 9 July, a second friendly match was confirmed, against Benfica. A third friendly, against Sevilla was next to be added.

Win Draw Loss Fixtures

24 July 2024 Friendly	Fulham	4–0	Queens Park Rangers	Motspur Park
13:00 BST	Jiménez; Wilson (x2); Traoré	Report		Stadium: Motspur Park Training Ground; Attendance: 0 (Behind closed doors)

27 July 2024 Friendly	Fulham	6–1	Watford	Motspur Park
13:00 BST	Lukić (pen.); Muniz; Iwobi; Jiménez; Stansfield; Pajaziti	Report		Stadium: Motspur Park Training Ground; Attendance: 0 (Behind closed doors)

2 August 2024 Algarve Cup	Benfica	0–1	Fulham	Faro/Loulé, Portugal
20:00 WEST		Report	Iwobi 21'; Robinson (yellow card) 71'	Stadium: Estádio Algarve; Referee: Fá Sanhá (Portugal)

5 August 2024 Friendly	Fulham	1–2	Sevilla	Faro/Loulé, Portugal
20:00 WEST (20:00 BST)	Smith Rowe 52'	Report	Romero 2', 45'	Stadium: Estádio Algarve; Referee: Hugo Silva (Portugal)

10 August 2024 Friendly	TSG Hoffenheim	0–2	Fulham	Sinsheim, Germany
17:00 CEST (16:00 BST)		Report	Smith Rowe 33'; Traoré 64'	Stadium: Rhein-Neckar-Arena; Attendance: 9,000+

== Competitions ==
=== Overall record ===
Competition	First match	Last match	Starting round	Final position	Record							
Competition	First match	Last match	Starting round	Final position	Pld	W	D	L	GF	GA	GD	Win %
Premier League	16 August 2024	25 May 2025	Matchday 1	11th	38	15	9	14	54	54	+0	39.47
FA Cup	9 January 2025	29 March 2025	Third round	Quarter-finals	4	2	1	1	7	6	+1	50.00
EFL Cup	27 August 2024	17 September 2024	Second round	Third round	2	1	1	0	3	1	+2	50.00
Total					44	18	11	15	64	61	+3	40.91

Source: Soccerway

=== Premier League ===
==== League table ====
Pos	Team	Pld	W	D	L	GF	GA	GD	Pts	Qualification or relegation
9	Bournemouth	38	15	11	12	58	46	+12	56	
10	Brentford	38	16	8	14	66	57	+9	56	
11	Fulham	38	15	9	14	54	54	0	54	
12	Crystal Palace	38	13	14	11	51	51	0	53	Qualification for the Conference League play-off round (Note: Since the winners of the 2024–25 EFL Cup, Newcastle United, qualified for the Champions League via league position, the spot reserved for the EFL Cup winners (Conference League play-off round) was initially passed to the 7th-placed team (Nottingham Forest). However due to multi-club ownership rules, the winners of the FA Cup, Crystal Palace, were not permitted to enter the Europa League and entered the Conference League play-off round instead, with Nottingham Forest taking their place in the Europa League. Crystal Palace appealed the decision but this was ultimately rejected.)
13	Everton	38	11	15	12	42	44	−2	48	

Source: Premier League
Rules for classification: 1) Points; 2) Goal difference; 3) Goals scored; 4) If the champions, relegated teams or qualified teams for UEFA competitions cannot be determined by rules 1 to 3, rules 4.1 to 4.3 are applied – 4.1) Points gained in head-to-head record between such teams; 4.2) Away goals scored in head-to-head record between such teams; 4.3) Play-offs

==== Results summary ====
Overall								Home						Away					
Pld	W	D	L	GF	GA	GD	Pts	W	D	L	GF	GA	GD	W	D	L	GF	GA	GD
38	15	9	14	54	54	0	54	7	5	7	27	30	−3	8	4	7	27	24	+3

Source: Soccerway

==== Results by round ====
Round	1	2	3	4	5	6	7	8	9	10	11	12	13	14	15	16	17	18	19	20	21	22	23	24	25	26	27	28	29	30	31	32	33	34	35	36	37	38
Ground	A	H	A	H	H	A	A	H	A	H	A	H	A	H	H	A	H	A	H	H	A	A	H	A	H	H	A	A	H	A	H	A	H	A	A	H	A	H
Result	L	W	D	D	W	W	L	L	D	W	W	L	D	W	D	D	D	W	D	D	L	W	L	W	W	L	W	L	W	L	W	L	L	W	L	L	W	L
Position	15	10	12	12	9	6	8	10	10	9	7	9	10	6	10	8	9	8	8	9	10	10	10	9	8	9	9	9	8	9	8	9	9	8	11	11	10	11
Points	0	3	4	5	8	11	11	11	12	15	18	18	19	22	23	24	25	28	29	30	30	33	33	36	39	39	42	42	45	45	48	48	48	51	51	51	54	54

Source: Premier League
A = Away; H = Home; W = Win; D = Draw; L = Loss; P = Postponed

==== Matches ====
On 18 June, the Premier League fixtures were released.

Win Draw Loss Fixtures

16 August 2024 1	Manchester United	1–0	Fulham	Trafford
20:00 BST	Mount (yellow card) 18'; Maguire (yellow card) 40'; Zirkzee 87'	Report	Bassey (yellow card) 25'; Pereira (yellow card) 70'; Cairney (yellow card) 73'	Stadium: Old Trafford; Attendance: 73,297; Referee: Robert Jones

24 August 2024 2	Fulham	2–1	Leicester City	Fulham
15:00 BST	Smith Rowe 18'; Iwobi 70'; Wilson (yellow card) 72'; Cairney (yellow card) 90+2'	Report	Faes 38'; Kristiansen (yellow card) 59'; Vestergaard (yellow card) 90+5'	Stadium: Craven Cottage; Attendance: 25,401; Referee: Darren Bond

31 August 2024 3	Ipswich Town	1–1	Fulham	Ipswich
15:00 BST	Delap 15'; Morsy (yellow card) 37'; Al-Hamadi (yellow card) 90+4'	Report	Traoré 32', (yellow card) 78'; Lukić (yellow card) 51'; Robinson (yellow card) 58'	Stadium: Portman Road; Attendance: 29,517; Referee: Lewis Smith

14 September 2024 4	Fulham	1–1	West Ham United	Fulham
15:00 BST	Jiménez 24'; Lukić (yellow card) 53'; Nelson (yellow card) 90+2'	Report	Rodríguez (yellow card) 69'; Álvarez (yellow card) 74'; Soler (yellow card) 82'; Ings 90+5'	Stadium: Craven Cottage; Attendance: 26,528; Referee: Tim Robinson

21 September 2024 5	Fulham	3–1	Newcastle United	Fulham
15:00 BST	Jiménez 5'; Tete (yellow card) 21'; Smith Rowe 22'; Lukić (yellow card) 28'; Traoré (yellow card) 36'; Pereira (yellow card) 44'; Reed (yellow card) 86'; Leno (yellow card) 90+2'; Nelson 90+2'	Report	Barnes 46'	Stadium: Craven Cottage; Attendance: 25,700; Referee: Peter Bankes

28 September 2024 6	Nottingham Forest	0–1	Fulham	West Bridgford
15:00 BST	Yates (yellow card) 31'; Murillo (yellow card) 50'	Report	Jiménez 51' (pen.); Tete (yellow card) 54'; Lukić (yellow card) 58'; Leno (yellow card) 84'; Reed (yellow card) 90'	Stadium: City Ground; Attendance: 30,139; Referee: Josh Smith

5 October 2024 7	Manchester City	3–2	Fulham	Manchester
15:00 BST	Kovačić 32', 47'; Doku 82'; Ederson (yellow card) 90+3'; Silva (yellow card) 90+5'	Report	Pereira 26'; Bassey (yellow card) 64'; Muniz 88'	Stadium: Etihad Stadium; Attendance: 52,719; Referee: Peter Bankes

19 October 2024 8	Fulham	1–3	Aston Villa	Fulham
15:00 BST	Jiménez 5'; Pereira (penalty missed) 27'; Bassey (yellow card) 57'; Andersen (red card) 64'; Smith Rowe (yellow card) 65'; Robinson (yellow card) 71'; Diop (yellow card) 90+8'	Report	Rogers 9', (yellow card) 70'; Bailey (yellow card) 33'; Watkins 59'; Diop 69' (o.g.); Digne (yellow card) 83'; Philogene (yellow card) 88' (yellow-red card) 90+3'	Stadium: Craven Cottage; Attendance: 26,743; Referee: Darren England

26 October 2024 9	Everton	1–1	Fulham	Liverpool
17:30 BST	Tarkowski (yellow card) 76'; Beto 90+4'	Report	Iwobi 61'	Stadium: Goodison Park; Attendance: 38,742; Referee: John Brooks
Note: Fixture was initially scheduled for a 15:00 kick-off, but was moved for live Sky Sports broadcast.

4 November 2024 10	Fulham	2–1	Brentford	Fulham
20:00 GMT	Wilson 90+2', 90+7', (yellow card) 90+7'; Muniz (yellow card) 90+7'	Report	Janelt 24'; Roerslev (yellow card) 57'	Stadium: Craven Cottage; Attendance: 24,931; Referee: Stuart Attwell
Note: Fixture was initially scheduled for 2 November, but was moved for live Sky Sports broadcast.

9 November 2024 11	Crystal Palace	0–2	Fulham	Selhurst
15:00 GMT	Kamada (red card) 76'; Lacroix (yellow card) 90+1'	Report	Smith Rowe 45+2'; Iwobi (yellow card) 63'; Wilson 83'	Stadium: Selhurst Park; Attendance: 25,142; Referee: Michael Salisbury

23 November 2024 12	Fulham	1–4	Wolverhampton Wanderers	Fulham
15:00 GMT	Iwobi 20'; Bassey (yellow card) 45+4'; Pereira (yellow card) 57'; Tete (yellow card) 67'	Report	Cunha 31', 87'; João Gomes 53'; Guedes 90+5'	Stadium: Craven Cottage; Attendance: 26,685; Referee: Robert Jones

1 December 2024 13	Tottenham Hotspur	1–1	Fulham	Tottenham
13:30 GMT	Johnson 54'	Report	Lukić (yellow card) 57'; Cairney 67', (red card) 83'	Stadium: Tottenham Hotspur Stadium; Attendance: 61,141; Referee: Darren Bond
Note: Fixture was initially scheduled for 30 November, but was due to Tottenham in UEFA Europa League action on the preceding Thursday.

5 December 2024 14	Fulham	3–1	Brighton & Hove Albion	Fulham
19:30 GMT	Iwobi 4', 87'; Berge (yellow card) 32'; O'Riley 79' (o.g.); Pereira (yellow card) 90+3'	Report	Baleba 56'; Van Hecke (yellow card) 63'; Dunk (yellow card) 79'	Stadium: Craven Cottage; Attendance: 26,368; Referee: Peter Bankes
Note: Fixture was initially scheduled for 3 December, but was moved for live Amazon Prime Video broadcasting.

8 December 2024 15	Fulham	1–1	Arsenal	Fulham
14:00 GMT	Jiménez 11', (yellow card) 79'; Lukić (yellow card) 50'; Bassey (yellow card) 72'; Robinson (yellow card) 86'	Report	Saliba 52'; Martinelli (yellow card) 82'; Rice (yellow card) 90+7'	Stadium: Craven Cottage; Attendance: 26,954; Referee: Chris Kavanagh
Note: Fixture was initially scheduled for 7 December, but was moved for live Sky Sports broadcasting.

14 December 2024 16	Liverpool	2–2	Fulham	Liverpool
15:00 GMT	Díaz (yellow card) 7'; Robertson (red card) 17'; Gakpo 47'; Jones (yellow card) 57'; Jota 86'; Núñez (yellow card) 88'	Report	Diop (yellow card) 2'; Pereira (yellow card) 9', (goal) 11'; Robinson (yellow card) 27'; Muniz 76'; Berge (yellow card) 83'	Stadium: Anfield; Attendance: 60,333; Referee: Tony Harrington

22 December 2024 17	Fulham	0–0	Southampton	Fulham
14:00 GMT	Jiménez (yellow card) 79'	Report	Downes (yellow card) 34'; Sugawara (yellow card) 48'; Ugochukwu (yellow card) 84'	Stadium: Craven Cottage; Attendance: 26,819; Referee: Tim Robinson
Note: Fixture was initially scheduled for 21 December, but was moved for live Sky Sports broadcasting.

26 December 2024 18	Chelsea	1–2	Fulham	Fulham
15:00 GMT	Palmer 16'; Neto (yellow card) 59'	Report	Lukić (yellow card) 34'; Andersen (yellow card) 38'; Wilson 82'; Robinson (yellow card) 90+1'; Muniz 90+5'	Stadium: Stamford Bridge; Attendance: 39,687; Referee: Sam Barrott

29 December 2024 19	Fulham	2–2	Bournemouth	Fulham
15:00 GMT	Jiménez 40'; Wilson 72'; Andersen (yellow card) 83'	Report	Billing (yellow card) 39'; Christie (yellow card) 43'; Evanilson 51'; Ünal (yellow card) 82'; Ouattara 89'	Stadium: Craven Cottage; Attendance: 27,301; Referee: Robert Jones

5 January 2025 20	Fulham	2–2	Ipswich Town	Fulham
14:00 GMT	Jiménez 69' (pen.), 90+1' (pen.); Pereira (yellow card) 90+3'	Report	Davis (yellow card) 27'; Szmodics 38'; Broadhead (yellow card) 39'; O'Shea (yellow card) 66'; Morsy (yellow card) 68'; Delap 71' (pen.); Johnson (yellow card) 78'	Stadium: Craven Cottage; Attendance: 27,042; Referee: Darren Bond
Note: Fixture was initially scheduled for 4 January, but was moved for live Sky Sports broadcasting.

14 January 2025 21	West Ham United	3–2	Fulham	Stratford
19:30 GMT	Soler 31'; Souček 33', (yellow card) 66'; Paquetá (yellow card) 53', (goal) 67'; Wan-Bissaka (yellow card) 70'	Report	Castagne (yellow card) 44'; Iwobi 51', 78'; Lukić (yellow card) 65'; Jiménez (yellow card) 90+7'	Stadium: London Stadium; Attendance: 62,456; Referee: Craig Pawson
Note: Fixture was initially scheduled for a 19:45 kick-off, but was moved for live TNT Sports broadcasting.

18 January 2025 22	Leicester City	0–2	Fulham	Leicester
15:00 GMT	Vestergaard (yellow card) 44'; McAteer (yellow card) 88'; Faes (yellow card) 90+4'	Report	Smith Rowe 48'; Lukić (yellow card) 54'; Traoré 68'	Stadium: King Power Stadium; Attendance: 31,500; Referee: Michael Salisbury

26 January 2025 23	Fulham	0–1	Manchester United	Fulham
19:00 GMT		Report	Ugarte (yellow card) 73'; Martínez 78'	Stadium: Craven Cottage; Attendance: 27,288; Referee: Anthony Taylor
Note: Fixture was initially scheduled for 25 January, but was moved for live TNT Sports broadcasting.

1 February 2025 24	Newcastle United	1–2	Fulham	Newcastle upon Tyne
15:00 GMT	Burn (yellow card) 35'; Murphy 37'; Joelinton (yellow card) 45+3'; Tonali (yellow card) 78'; Gordon (yellow card) 81'	Report	Andersen (yellow card) 17'; Robinson (yellow card) 20'; Jiménez 61'; Muniz 82'; Pereira (yellow card) 85'; Leno (yellow card) 90+2'	Stadium: St James' Park; Attendance: 52,173; Referee: Chris Kavanagh

15 February 2025 25	Fulham	2–1	Nottingham Forest	Fulham
15:00 GMT	Smith Rowe 15'; Bassey 62'	Report	Wood 37'	Stadium: Craven Cottage; Attendance: 27,164; Referee: Thomas Bramall

22 February 2025 26	Fulham	0–2	Crystal Palace	Fulham
15:00 GMT	Berge (yellow card) 22'	Report	Andersen 37' (o.g.); Muñoz (yellow card) 44', (goal) 66'; Guéhi (yellow card) 69'; Hughes (yellow card) 83'	Stadium: Craven Cottage; Attendance: 26,777; Referee: Robert Jones

25 February 2025 27	Wolverhampton Wanderers	1–2	Fulham	Wolverhampton
19:30 GMT	João Gomes 18'; Bueno (yellow card) 28'	Report	Sessegnon 1'; Lukić (yellow card) 45+2'; Muniz 47'; Berge (yellow card) 53'; Robinson (yellow card) 90+4'	Stadium: Molineux Stadium; Attendance: 28,708; Referee: Peter Bankes
Note: Fixture was initially scheduled for a 19:45 kick-off, but was moved for live TNT Sports broadcasting.

8 March 2025 28	Brighton & Hove Albion	2–1	Fulham	Brighton and Hove
15:00 GMT	Van Hecke 41'; João Pedro 90+8' (pen.)	Report	Jiménez 35'; Robinson (yellow card) 69'; Andersen (yellow card) 90+7'	Stadium: Falmer Stadium; Attendance: 31,584; Referee: Sam Barrott

16 March 2025 29	Fulham	2–0	Tottenham Hotspur	Fulham
13:30 GMT	Muniz 78'; Sessegnon 88'	Report		Stadium: Craven Cottage; Attendance: 27,182; Referee: Andrew Madley
Note: Fixture was initially scheduled for 15 March, but was moved due to Tottenham's UEFA Europa League involvements on the preceding Thursday.

1 April 2025 30	Arsenal	2–1	Fulham	Holloway
19:45 BST	Merino 37'; Rice (yellow card) 72'; Saka 73'	Report	Andersen (yellow card) 53'; Lukić (yellow card) 57'; Muniz 90+4'	Stadium: Emirates Stadium; Attendance: 60,256; Referee: John Brooks

6 April 2025 31	Fulham	3–2	Liverpool	Fulham
14:00 GMT	Sessegnon 23'; Iwobi 32'; Muniz 37'; Lukić (yellow card) 46'; Smith Rowe (yellow card) 86'; Leno (yellow card) 90+5'	Report	Mac Allister 14'; Díaz 72'	Stadium: Craven Cottage; Attendance: 27,770; Referee: Chris Kavanagh
Note: Fixture was initially scheduled for 5 April, but was moved for live Sky Sports broadcasting.

14 April 2025 32	Bournemouth	1–0	Fulham	Bournemouth
20:00 BST	Semenyo 1'; Senesi (yellow card) 44'; Adams (yellow card) 86'; Cook (yellow card) 90+4'	Report	Robinson (yellow card) 61'; Cairney (yellow card) 68'	Stadium: Vitality Stadium; Attendance: 11,195; Referee: Michael Oliver
Note: Fixture was initially scheduled for 12 April, but was moved for live Sky Sports broadcasting.

20 April 2025 33	Fulham	1–2	Chelsea	Fulham
14:00 BST	Iwobi 20'; Bassey (yellow card) 24'	Report	Colwill (yellow card) 29'; Cucurella (yellow card) 80'; George 83'; Caicedo (yellow card) 85'; Neto 90+3'	Stadium: Craven Cottage; Attendance: 27,712; Referee: Anthony Taylor

26 April 2025 34	Southampton	1–2	Fulham	Southampton
15:00 BST	Stephens 14'; Sulemana (yellow card) 69'	Report	Jiménez (yellow card) 70'; Smith Rowe 72'; Sessegnon 90+2'	Stadium: St Mary's Stadium; Attendance: 28,946; Referee: Tony Harrington

3 May 2025 35	Aston Villa	1–0	Fulham	Birmingham
12:30 BST	Tielemans 12'	Report	Sessegnon (yellow card) 31'; Tete (yellow card) 52'; Bassey (yellow card) 59'; Berge (yellow card) 66'; Traoré (yellow card) 90+9'	Stadium: Villa Park; Attendance: 42,515; Referee: Robert Jones
Note: Fixture was originally scheduled for 15:00, but was moved for TNT Sports broadcasting.

10 May 2025 36	Fulham	1–3	Everton	Fulham
15:00 BST	Jiménez 17'; Berge (yellow card) 56'	Report	Mykolenko 45+3'; Keane 70'; Beto 73'	Stadium: Craven Cottage; Attendance: 27,653; Referee: Darren England

18 May 2025 37	Brentford	2–3	Fulham	Brentford
15:00 BST	Mbeumo 22', (penalty missed) 27'; Wissa (yellow card) 37', (goal) 43'; Van den Berg (yellow card) 45+2'; Nørgaard (yellow card) 48'; Lewis-Potter (yellow card) 52'	Report	Tete (yellow card) 14'; Jiménez 16'; Smith Rowe (yellow card) 66'; Cairney 68'; Wilson 70'; Andersen (yellow card) 72'; Leno (yellow card) 90+8'	Stadium: Brentford Community Stadium; Attendance: 17,136; Referee: Jarred Gillett

25 May 2025 38	Fulham	0–2	Manchester City	Fulham
16:00 BST		Report	Gündoğan 21'; Haaland 72' (pen.)	Stadium: Craven Cottage; Attendance: 27,671; Referee: Andrew Madley

=== FA Cup ===
Fulham joined the FA Cup at the third round stage, and were drawn at home to Watford, then away to Wigan Athletic in the fourth round, Manchester United in the fifth round, and home to Crystal Palace in the quarter-finals.

Win Draw Loss Fixtures

9 January 2025 Third round	Fulham	4–1	Watford	Fulham
19:45 GMT	Muniz 26'; Cuenca (yellow card) 38'; Jiménez 49' (pen.); Andersen 65'; Castagne 85'	Report	Kayembe (yellow card) 8'; Vata 33'	Stadium: Craven Cottage; Attendance: 15,981; Referee: Matt Donohue

8 February 2025 Fourth round	Wigan Athletic	1–2	Fulham	Wigan
15:00 GMT	Robinson (yellow card) 7'; Smith 50'; McHugh (yellow card) 78'	Report	Muniz 23', 55'	Stadium: Brick Community Stadium; Attendance: 12,281; Referee: David Webb

2 March 2025 Fifth round	Manchester United	1–1 (a.e.t.) (3–4 p)	Fulham	Trafford
16:30 GMT	Ugarte (yellow card) 25'; Fernandes 71'	Report	Pereira (yellow card) 27'; Bassey 45+1'; Andersen (yellow card) 90+6'	Stadium: Old Trafford; Attendance: 67,614; Referee: Stuart Attwell
	Penalties
	Fernandes (penalty scored); Dalot (penalty scored); Casemiro (penalty scored); Lindelöf (penalty missed); Zirkzee (penalty missed)		(penalty scored) Jiménez; (penalty scored) Berge; (penalty scored) Willian; (penalty scored) Robinson

29 March 2025 Quarter-finals	Fulham	0–3	Crystal Palace	Fulham
12:15 GMT		Report	Wharton (yellow card) 14'; Eze 34'; Sarr 38'; Richards (yellow card) 46'; Lacroix (yellow card) 74'; Nketiah 75'; Clyne (yellow card) 89'	Stadium: Craven Cottage; Attendance: 26,222; Referee: Darren England

=== EFL Cup ===
As a non-European competing Premier League side, Fuham entered in the second round, and were drawn away to EFL League One side Birmingham City. In the third round, they were drawn away to EFL Championship side Preston North End, losing after 17 rounds of penalties.

Win Draw Loss Fixtures

27 August 2024 Second round	Birmingham City	0–2	Fulham	Birmingham
20:00 BST	May (yellow card) 56'	Report	Jiménez 10' (pen.); Stansfield 14'; Reed (yellow card) 49'; Traoré (yellow card) 90+1'	Stadium: St Andrew's; Attendance: 11,949; Referee: Keith Stroud

17 September 2024 Third round	Preston North End	1–1 (16–15 p)	Fulham	Preston
19:45 BST	Ledson 35'	Report	Diop (yellow card) 17'; Nelson 61'	Stadium: Deepdale; Attendance: 5,530; Referee: Bobby Madley
	Penalties
	Whiteman (penalty scored); Greenwood (penalty scored); Okkels (penalty scored); McCann (penalty scored); Osmajić (penalty scored); Ledson (penalty scored); Lindsay (penalty scored); Storey (penalty scored); Kesler-Hayden (penalty missed); Hughes (penalty scored); Woodman (penalty scored); Whiteman (penalty scored); Greenwood (penalty scored); Okkels (penalty scored); McCann (penalty scored); Osmajić (penalty scored); Ledson (penalty scored)		(penalty scored) Jiménez; (penalty scored) Lukić; (penalty scored) Berge; (penalty scored) Iwobi; (penalty scored) Sessegnon; (penalty scored) Castagne; (penalty scored) Smith Rowe; (penalty scored) Diop; (penalty missed) Cuenca; (penalty scored) Godo; (penalty scored) Benda; (penalty scored) Jiménez; (penalty scored) Lukić; (penalty scored) Berge; (penalty scored) Iwobi; (penalty scored) Sessegnon; (penalty missed) Castagne

== Statistics ==
=== Appearances and goals ===
As of match played 25 May 2025

Players with no appearances are not included on the list
Italics indicate a loaned in player

No.	Pos	Nat	Player	Total		Premier League		FA Cup		EFL Cup	
No.	Pos	Nat	Player	Apps	Goals	Apps	Goals	Apps	Goals	Apps	Goals
1	GK	(Germany) GER	Bernd Leno	40	0	38	0	2	0	0	0
2	DF	(Netherlands) NED	Kenny Tete	22	0	21+1	0	0	0	0	0
3	DF	(Nigeria) NGR	Calvin Bassey	37	2	34+1	1	2	1	0	0
5	DF	(Denmark) DEN	Joachim Andersen	33	1	29	0	3	1	1	0
6	MF	(England) ENG	Harrison Reed	17	0	0+12	0	1+2	0	2	0
7	FW	(Mexico) MEX	Raúl Jiménez	43	14	30+8	12	0+3	1	1+1	1
8	FW	(Wales) WAL	Harry Wilson	27	6	12+13	6	0	0	2	0
9	FW	(Brazil) BRA	Rodrigo Muniz	36	11	8+23	8	4	3	1	0
10	MF	(Scotland) SCO	Tom Cairney	29	2	3+22	2	1+1	0	2	0
11	FW	(Spain) ESP	Adama Traoré	41	2	18+18	2	2+2	0	0+1	0
12	FW	(Brazil) BRA	Carlos Vinícius	4	0	0+3	0	0+1	0	0	0
15	DF	(Spain) ESP	Jorge Cuenca	12	0	4+4	0	2	0	2	0
16	MF	(Norway) NOR	Sander Berge	36	0	26+5	0	2+1	0	2	0
17	MF	(Nigeria) NGR	Alex Iwobi	44	9	35+3	9	3+1	0	0+2	0
18	MF	(Brazil) BRA	Andreas Pereira	37	2	25+8	2	4	0	0	0
19	FW	(England) ENG	Reiss Nelson	12	2	5+6	1	0	0	1	1
20	MF	(Serbia) SRB	Saša Lukić	35	0	28+2	0	3	0	0+2	0
21	DF	(Belgium) BEL	Timothy Castagne	30	1	17+7	0	4	1	2	0
22	FW	(Brazil) BRA	Willian	12	0	2+8	0	1+1	0	0	0
23	GK	(Germany) GER	Steven Benda	4	0	0	0	2	0	2	0
24	MF	(England) ENG	Joshua King	11	0	1+7	0	1+1	0	0+1	0
30	DF	(England) ENG	Ryan Sessegnon	22	4	7+9	4	2+2	0	2	0
31	DF	(France) FRA	Issa Diop	24	0	15+6	0	1+1	0	1	0
32	MF	(England) ENG	Emile Smith Rowe	40	6	25+9	6	1+3	0	0+2	0
33	DF	(United States) USA	Antonee Robinson	38	0	35+1	0	2	0	0	0
47	FW	(Ivory Coast) CIV	Martial Godo	5	0	0+2	0	1+1	0	0+1	0
Players featured but departed permanently during season:
28	FW	(England) ENG	Jay Stansfield	2	1	0+1	0	0	0	1	1

=== Top scorers ===
As of match played 18 May 2025

Includes all competitive matches. The list is sorted by squad number when total goals are equal.

Rank	No.	Nat.	Player	Premier League	FA Cup	EFL Cup	Total
1	7	(Mexico)	Raúl Jiménez	12	1	1	14
2	9	(Brazil)	Rodrigo Muniz	8	3	0	11
3	17	(Nigeria)	Alex Iwobi	9	0	0	9
4=	8	(Wales)	Harry Wilson	6	0	0	6
4=	32	(England)	Emile Smith Rowe	6	0	0	6
6	30	(England)	Ryan Sessegnon	4	0	0	4
7=	3	(Nigeria)	Calvin Bassey	1	1	0	2
7=	10	(Scotland)	Tom Cairney	2	0	0	2
7=	11	(Spain)	Adama Traoré	2	0	0	2
7=	18	(Brazil)	Andreas Pereira	2	0	0	2
7=	19	(England)	Reiss Nelson	1	0	1	2
12=	5	(Denmark)	Joachim Andersen	0	1	0	1
12=	21	(Belgium)	Timothy Castagne	0	1	0	1
12=	28	(England)	Jay Stansfield	0	0	1	1
Own goals				1	0	0	1
Totals				54	7	3	64
