= 2023–24 Fulham F.C. season =

125th season in existence of Fulham FC

Fulham
2023–24 season
- Owner: Shahid Khan
- Chairman: Shahid Khan
- Manager: Marco Silva
- Stadium: Craven Cottage
- Premier League: 13th
- FA Cup: Fourth round
- EFL Cup: Semi-finals
- Top goalscorer: League: Rodrigo Muniz (9); All: Rodrigo Muniz (10)
- Highest home attendance: 24,467 vs Luton Town (16 September 2023, Premier League)
- Lowest home attendance: 12,831 vs Norwich City (26 September 2023, EFL Cup)
- Average home league attendance: 24,301
- Biggest win: 5–0 vs Nottingham Forest (6 December 2023, Premier League); 5–0 vs West Ham United (10 December 2023, Premier League)
- Biggest defeat: 1–5 vs Manchester City (2 September 2023, Premier League); 0–4 vs Manchester City (11 May 2024, Premier League)
Home colours	Away colours	Third colours

The 2023–24 season was the 126th season of Fulham Football Club since turning professional and their second consecutive season in the Premier League. In addition to the domestic league, the club participated in the FA Cup and the EFL Cup.

== Players ==
As of 1 February 2024

No.	Player	Position	Nationality	Date of birth (age)	Signed from	Date signed	Fee	Contract end
Goalkeepers
1	Marek Rodák	GK	(Slovakia)	13 December 1996 (age 29)	(Slovakia) Košice	1 July 2013	Undisclosed	30 June 2024
17	Bernd Leno	GK	(Germany)	4 March 1992 (age 34)	Arsenal	2 August 2022	£3,600,000	30 June 2027
23	Steven Benda	GK	(Germany)	1 October 1998 (age 28)	(Wales) Swansea City	30 August 2023	Undisclosed	30 June 2026
36	Alex Borto	GK	(United States)	6 November 2003 (age 23)	(United States) Cedar Stars Rush	1 August 2020	Undisclosed	30 June 2027
Defenders
2	Kenny Tete	RB	(Netherlands)	9 October 1995 (age 31)	(France) Lyon	10 September 2020	£3,200,000	30 June 2025
3	Calvin Bassey	CB	(Nigeria)	31 December 1999 (age 26)	(Netherlands) Ajax	28 July 2023	Undisclosed	30 June 2027
4	Tosin Adarabioyo	CB	(England)	24 September 1997 (age 29)	Manchester City	5 October 2020	£1,650,000	30 June 2024
12	Fodé Ballo-Touré	LB	(Senegal)	3 January 1997 (age 29)	(Italy) Milan	2 September 2023	Loan	31 May 2024
13	Tim Ream	CB	(United States)	5 October 1987 (age 39)	Bolton Wanderers	20 August 2015	£1,700,000	30 June 2025
21	Timothy Castagne	RB	(Belgium)	5 December 1995 (age 30)	Leicester City	29 August 2023	Undisclosed	30 June 2027
31	Issa Diop	CB	(France)	9 January 1997 (age 29)	West Ham United	10 August 2022	£17,800,000	30 June 2027
33	Antonee Robinson	LB	(United States)	8 August 1997 (age 29)	Wigan Athletic	20 August 2020	£2,100,000	30 June 2028
41	Devan Tanton	RB	(Colombia)	3 January 2004 (age 22)	(Spain) UE Cornellà	4 January 2021	Undisclosed	30 June 2025
44	Luc de Fougerolles	RB	(Canada)	12 October 2005 (age 21)	Academy	1 July 2023	Trainee	30 June 2024
Midfielders
6	Harrison Reed	CM	(England)	27 January 1995 (age 31)	Southampton	30 August 2020	£6,500,000	30 June 2027
10	Tom Cairney	CM	(Scotland)	20 January 1991 (age 35)	Blackburn Rovers	1 July 2015	£4,200,000	30 June 2025
14	Bobby Decordova-Reid	AM	(Jamaica)	2 February 1993 (age 33)	(Wales) Cardiff City	24 January 2020	£8,900,000	30 June 2024
22	Alex Iwobi	AM	(Nigeria)	3 May 1996 (age 30)	Everton	2 September 2023	£22,000,000	30 June 2028
18	Andreas Pereira	AM	(Brazil)	1 January 1996 (age 30)	Manchester United	11 July 2022	£9,500,000	30 June 2026
26	João Palhinha	DM	(Portugal)	9 July 1995 (age 31)	(Portugal) Sporting CP	4 July 2022	£20,000,000	30 June 2028
28	Sasa Lukic	CM	(Serbia)	13 August 1996 (age 30)	(Italy) Torino	31 January 2023	£9,100,000	30 June 2027
49	Matt Dibley-Dias	CM	(England)	29 October 2003 (age 23)	Academy	1 July 2022	—N/a	30 June 2027
Forwards
7	Raúl Jiménez	CF	(Mexico)	5 May 1991 (age 35)	Wolverhampton Wanderers	26 July 2023	£5,500,000	30 June 2025
8	Harry Wilson	RW	(Wales)	22 March 1997 (age 29)	Liverpool	24 July 2021	£14,000,000	30 June 2026
9	Armando Broja	CF	(Albania)	10 September 2001 (age 25)	Chelsea	1 February 2024	Loan	30 June 2024
11	Adama Traoré	RW	(Spain)	25 January 1996 (age 30)	Wolverhampton Wanderers	12 August 2023	Free transfer	30 June 2025
19	Rodrigo Muniz	CF	(Brazil)	4 May 2001 (age 25)	(Brazil) Flamengo	20 August 2021	£8,000,000	30 June 2026
20	Willian	LW	(Brazil)	9 August 1988 (age 38)	(Brazil) Corinthians	1 September 2022	Free transfer	30 June 2024
30	Carlos Vinícius	CF	(Brazil)	25 March 1995 (age 31)	(Portugal) Benfica	1 September 2022	£5,000,000	30 June 2025
Out on loan
5	Terence Kongolo	CB	(Netherlands)	14 February 1994 (age 32)	Huddersfield Town	16 October 2020	£4,400,000	30 June 2024
27	Kevin Mbabu	RB	(Switzerland)	19 April 1995 (age 31)	(Germany) VfL Wolfsburg	27 July 2022	£5,500,000	30 June 2025
35	Tyrese Francois	CM	(Australia)	16 July 2000 (age 26)	Academy	1 July 2018	—N/a	30 June 2024
38	Luke Harris	AM	(Wales)	4 March 2005 (age 21)	Academy	1 July 2021	—N/a	30 June 2026
40	George Wickens	GK	(England)	8 November 2001 (age 25)	Academy	1 July 2020	—N/a	30 June 2024
65	Jay Stansfield	CF	(England)	24 November 2002 (age 23)	Exeter City	1 August 2019	Undisclosed	30 June 2024

== Transfers ==
=== In ===
Date	Pos.	Player	Transferred from	Fee	Ref.
6 July 2023	CM	(Australia) Chris Donnell †	(Australia) Perth Glory	Undisclosed	
25 July 2023	CF	(Mexico) Raúl Jiménez	(England) Wolverhampton Wanderers	Undisclosed	
28 July 2023	CB	(Nigeria) Calvin Bassey	(Netherlands) Ajax	Undisclosed	
12 August 2023	RW	(Spain) Adama Traoré	(England) Wolverhampton Wanderers	Free transfer	
29 August 2023	RB	(Belgium) Timothy Castagne	(England) Leicester City	Undisclosed	
30 August 2023	GK	(Germany) Steven Benda	(Wales) Swansea City	Undisclosed	
2 September 2023	AM	(Nigeria) Alex Iwobi	(England) Everton	Undisclosed	

† Signed for the Under-21s

=== Out ===
Date	Pos.	Player	Transferred to	Fee	Ref.
30 June 2023	CB	(Iceland) Thorsteinn Antonsson	(Iceland) Selfoss	Released	
30 June 2023	GK	(England) Taye Ashby-Hammond	(England) Stevenage	Free transfer	
30 June 2023	LB	(England) Joe Bryan	(England) Millwall	End of contract	
30 June 2023	CB	(Republic of Ireland) Shane Duffy	(England) Norwich City	Free transfer	
30 June 2023	GK	(Argentina) Paulo Gazzaniga	(Spain) Girona	Released	
30 June 2023	AM	(England) Sonny Hilton	(England) Bootle	Released	
30 June 2023	LW	(Democratic Republic of the Congo) Neeskens Kebano	(United Arab Emirates) Al Jazira	End of contract	
30 June 2023	LB	(France) Ziyad Larkeche	(England) Queens Park Rangers	Released	
30 June 2023	DM	(England) Jonathon Page	Free agent	Released	
30 June 2023	CM	(England) Murphy Parker	(United States) Michigan Wolverines	Released	
30 June 2023	RB	(England) Steven Sessegnon	(England) Wigan Athletic	Released	
30 June 2023	CF	(France) Jean-Pierre Tiéhi	(Greece) AEK Athens B	Released	
1 July 2023	LW	(Bulgaria) Sylvester Jasper	(Portugal) Portimonense	Compensation	
10 August 2023	LW	(Portugal) Ivan Cavaleiro	(France) Lille	Undisclosed	
19 August 2023	ST	(Serbia) Aleksandar Mitrović	(Saudi Arabia) Al Hilal	Undisclosed	
3 September 2023	RW	(France) Anthony Knockaert	(France) Valenciennes	Released	
23 January 2024	LW	(Republic of Ireland) Ollie O'Neill	(England) Leyton Orient	Undisclosed	
29 January 2024	CB	(Wales) Jay Williams	(England) Sutton United	Undisclosed	
1 February 2024	CB	(England) Idris Odutayo	(England) Bromley	Undisclosed	

=== Loaned in ===
Date	Pos.	Player	Loaned from	Until	Ref.
2 September 2023	LB	(Senegal) Fodé Ballo-Touré	(Italy) Milan	End of season	
1 February 2024	CF	(Albania) Armando Broja	(England) Chelsea	End of season	

=== Loaned out ===
Date	Pos.	Player	Loaned to	Date until	Ref.
3 July 2023	CF	(Scotland) Kieron Bowie	(England) Northampton Town	End of season	
13 July 2023	CB	(Scotland) Ibane Bowat	(Austria) TSV Hartberg	End of season	
14 July 2023	GK	(England) Luca Ashby-Hammond	(England) Crawley Town	10 January 2024 (Note: On 10 January, Ashby-Hammond was recalled from his season-long loan at Crawley and subsequently was loaned to Notts County.)	
18 August 2023	RB	(England) Luciano D'Auria-Henry	(England) Cheltenham Town	2 January 2024 (Note: On 2 January, D'Auria-Henry was recalled from his season-long loan at Cheltenham.)	
22 August 2023	CF	(Finland) Terry Ablade	(England) Carlisle United	End of season	
24 August 2023	CF	(England) Jay Stansfield	(England) Birmingham City	End of season	
26 August 2023	CF	(England) Olly Sanderson	(England) Oxford City	15 January 2024 (Note: On 15 January, Sanderson was recalled from his season-long loan at Oxford City and subsequently was loaned to Sutton.)	
1 September 2023	LW	(England) Martial Godo	(England) Wigan Athletic	End of season	
1 September 2023	CB	(Netherlands) Terence Kongolo	(Austria) Rapid Wien	End of season	
1 September 2023	RB	(Switzerland) Kevin Mbabu	(Germany) FC Augsburg	End of season	
3 January 2024	AM	(Wales) Luke Harris	(England) Exeter City	End of season	
10 January 2024	GK	(England) Luca Ashby-Hammond	(England) Notts County	End of season	
11 January 2024	GK	(England) George Wickens	(Scotland) Ross County	End of season	
15 January 2024	CF	(England) Olly Sanderson	(England) Sutton United	End of Season	
1 February 2024	CM	(Australia) Chris Donnell	(Scotland) Airdrieonians	End of season	
1 February 2024	CM	(Australia) Tyrese Francois	(Denmark) Vejle	End of season	
2 February 2024	CF	(Brazil) Carlos Vinícius	(Turkey) Galatasaray	End of Season	

== Pre-season and friendlies ==
Win Draw Loss Fixtures

Fulham announced a tour of the United States to take part in the Premier League Summer Series pre-season tournament with matches against Brentford, Aston Villa and Chelsea. On 12 July, a home pre-season friendly against 1899 Hoffenheim was confirmed.

23 July 2023 Premier League Summer Series	Fulham	3–2	Brentford	Philadelphia, United States
16:00 EDT	Wilson 3', (yellow card) 32'; Decordova-Reid 36'; Carlos Vinícius 47'; Reed (yellow card) 61'; Willian (yellow card) 90+5'	Report	Wissa 7'; Ajer 48'; Jørgensen (yellow card) 61'	Stadium: Lincoln Financial Field; Attendance: 40,332; Referee: Peter Bankes

26 July 2023 Premier League Summer Series	Fulham	0–2	Aston Villa	Orlando, United States
19:00 EDT	De Fougerolles (yellow card) 30'; Carlos Vinícius (yellow card) 35'	Report	Konsa (yellow card) 35'; Philogene 40', (yellow card) 47'; Diaby 73'	Stadium: Exploria Stadium; Attendance: 16,134; Referee: Robert Jones

30 July 2023 Premier League Summer Series	Chelsea	2–0	Fulham	Landover, United States
14:45 EDT	Thiago Silva 20'; Nkunku 41'	Report		Stadium: FedEx Field; Referee: Robert Jones

5 August 2023 Friendly	Fulham	2–1	1899 Hoffenheim	Fulham
13:00 BST	Jiménez 52'; Bassey 73'	Report	Prömel 57'	Stadium: Craven Cottage

== Competitions ==
=== Overall record ===
Competition	First match	Last match	Starting round	Final position	Record							
Competition	First match	Last match	Starting round	Final position	Pld	W	D	L	GF	GA	GD	Win %
Premier League	12 August 2023	19 May 2024	Matchday 1	13th	38	13	8	17	55	61	−6	34.21
FA Cup	5 January 2024	27 January 2024	Third round	Fourth round	2	1	0	1	1	2	−1	50.00
EFL Cup	29 August 2023	24 January 2024	Second round	Semi-finals	6	2	3	1	9	7	+2	33.33
Total					46	16	11	19	65	70	−5	34.78

Source: Soccerway

=== Premier League ===
==== League table ====
Pos	Team	Pld	W	D	L	GF	GA	GD	Pts
11	Brighton & Hove Albion	38	12	12	14	55	62	−7	48
12	Bournemouth	38	13	9	16	54	67	−13	48
13	Fulham	38	13	8	17	55	61	−6	47
14	Wolverhampton Wanderers	38	13	7	18	50	65	−15	46
15	Everton	38	13	9	16	40	51	−11	40 (Note: Everton were deducted eight points for breaching profitability and sustainability rules. They were originally deducted ten points but this was reduced to six after an appeal. The club were then deducted an additional two points for further PSR breaches.)

Source: Premier League
Rules for classification: 1) Points; 2) Goal difference; 3) Goals scored; 4) If the champions, relegated teams or qualified teams for UEFA competitions cannot be determined by rules 1 to 3, rules 4.1 to 4.3 are applied – 4.1) Points gained in head-to-head record between such teams; 4.2) Away goals scored in head-to-head record between such teams; 4.3) Play-offs

==== Results summary ====
Overall								Home						Away					
Pld	W	D	L	GF	GA	GD	Pts	W	D	L	GF	GA	GD	W	D	L	GF	GA	GD
38	13	8	17	55	61	−6	47	9	2	8	31	24	+7	4	6	9	24	37	−13

Source: Soccerway

==== Results by round ====
Round	1	2	3	4	5	6	7	8	9	10	11	12	13	14	15	16	17	18	19	20	21	22	23	24	25	26	27	28	29	30	31	32	33	34	35	36	37	38
Ground	A	H	A	A	H	A	H	H	A	A	H	A	H	A	H	H	A	H	A	H	A	H	A	H	H	A	H	A	H	A	A	H	A	H	H	A	H	A
Result	W	L	D	L	W	D	L	W	L	D	L	L	W	L	W	W	L	L	L	W	L	D	D	W	L	W	W	L	W	D	L	L	W	L	D	D	L	W
Position	6	13	12	13	10	11	13	12	13	14	15	15^{1}	14	14	12	10	11	13	13	13	13	13	13	12	12	12	12	12	12	12	13	13	12	12	13	13	14	13
Points	3	3	4	4	7	8	8	11	11	12	12	12	15	15	18	21	21	21	21	24	24	25	26	29	29	32	35	35	38	39	39	39	42	42	43	44	44	47

Source: Soccerway
- ^{1} Fulham were originally 16th at the end of Matchday 12. On 17 November 2023, Everton were deducted 10 points, subsequently bringing Fulham up to 15th.
A = Away; H = Home; W = Win; D = Draw; L = Loss

==== Matches ====
On 15 June, the Premier League fixtures were released.

Win Draw Loss Fixtures

12 August 2023 1	Everton	0–1	Fulham	Walton
15:00 BST		Report	Willian (yellow card) 30'; Decordova-Reid 73'; Tete (yellow card) 87'	Stadium: Goodison Park; Attendance: 39,940; Referee: Stuart Attwell

19 August 2023 2	Fulham	0–3	Brentford	Fulham
15:00 BST	Ream (yellow card) 45+3' (yellow-red card) 64'; Reed (yellow card) 64'; Palhinha (yellow card) 85'	Report	Hickey (yellow card) 40'; Wissa 44'; Henry (yellow card) 61'; Mbeumo 66' (pen.), 90+2'	Stadium: Craven Cottage; Attendance: 24,236; Referee: Darren Bond

26 August 2023 3	Arsenal	2–2	Fulham	Holloway
15:00 BST	Saka 70' (pen.); Nketiah 72'	Report	Pereira 1'; Jiménez (yellow card) 19'; Bassey (yellow card) 50' (yellow-red card) 83'; Lukić (yellow card) 66'; Palhinha 87'; Tete (yellow card) 90+10'	Stadium: Emirates Stadium; Attendance: 59,961; Referee: Paul Tierney

2 September 2023 4	Manchester City	5–1	Fulham	Manchester
15:00 BST	Álvarez 31'; Rodri (yellow card) 41'; Aké 45+5'; Haaland 58', 70' (pen.), 90+5'; Silva (yellow card) 78'	Report	Ream 33'; Diop (yellow card) 43'; Robinson (yellow card) 45+3'; Decordova-Reid (yellow card) 54'; Pereira (yellow card) 69'	Stadium: City of Manchester Stadium; Attendance: 52,899; Referee: Michael Oliver

16 September 2023 5	Fulham	1–0	Luton Town	Fulham
15:00 BST	Castagne (yellow card) 40'; Diop (yellow card) 44'; Carlos Vinícius 65'	Report	Chong (yellow card) 27'; Kaminski (yellow card) 37'	Stadium: Craven Cottage; Attendance: 24,467; Referee: Michael Salisbury

23 September 2023 6	Crystal Palace	0–0	Fulham	Selhurst
15:00 BST	Ayew (yellow card) 21'; Mitchell (yellow card) 40'; Doucouré (yellow card) 68'	Report	Palhinha (yellow card) 14'; Ream (yellow card) 16'	Stadium: Selhurst Park; Attendance: 25,072; Referee: Paul Tierney

2 October 2023 7	Fulham	0–2	Chelsea	Fulham
20:00 BST	Pereira (yellow card) 57'	Report	Mudryk 18'; Broja 19'; Cucurella (yellow card) 34'; Palmer (yellow card) 55'; Sterling (yellow card) 68'; Sánchez (yellow card) 87'	Stadium: Craven Cottage; Attendance: 24,445; Referee: Tim Robinson

7 October 2023 8	Fulham	3–1	Sheffield United	Fulham
15:00 BST	Palhinha (yellow card) 50'; Decordova-Reid 53'; Foderingham 76' (o.g.); Willian 90+2'	Report	Robinson 68' (o.g.); McBurnie (yellow card) 73'; Norwood (yellow card) 90+1'	Stadium: Craven Cottage; Attendance: 24,361; Referee: Sam Barrott

23 October 2023 9	Tottenham Hotspur	2–0	Fulham	Tottenham
20:00 BST	Højbjerg (yellow card) 35'; Son 36'; Maddison 54'; Vicario (yellow card) 85'	Report		Stadium: Tottenham Hotspur Stadium; Attendance: 61,286; Referee: Anthony Taylor
Note: Live on Sky Sports

29 October 2023 10	Brighton & Hove Albion	1–1	Fulham	Falmer
14:00 GMT	Ferguson 26'	Report	Palhinha 65'; Robinson (yellow card) 73'; Muniz (yellow card) 78'; Wilson (yellow card) 90'	Stadium: Falmer Stadium; Attendance: 31,550; Referee: Michael Salisbury

4 November 2023 11	Fulham	0–1	Manchester United	Fulham
12:30 GMT	Robinson (yellow card) 31'; Palhinha (yellow card) 66'; Pereira (yellow card) 66'; Iwobi (yellow card) 82'; Wilson (yellow card) 85'; Jiménez (yellow card) 90+7'	Report	Garnacho (yellow card) 67'; Dalot (yellow card) 88'; Fernandes 90+1'	Stadium: Craven Cottage; Attendance: 24,415; Referee: John Brooks

12 November 2023 12	Aston Villa	3–1	Fulham	Aston
14:00 GMT	Robinson 27' (o.g.); McGinn 42'; Watkins 64', (yellow card) 66'; Konsa (yellow card) 83'	Report	Palhinha (yellow card) 52'; Robinson (yellow card) 65'; Jiménez 70'; Iwobi (yellow card) 74'; Carlos Vinícius (yellow card) 90+4'; Reed (yellow card) 90+6'	Stadium: Villa Park; Attendance: 41,608; Referee: Simon Hooper

27 November 2023 13	Fulham	3–2	Wolverhampton Wanderers	Fulham
20:00 GMT	Iwobi 7'; Ream (yellow card) 19'; Willian 59' (pen.), 90+4' (pen.); Carlos Vinícius (yellow card) 88'	Report	Cunha 22'; João Gomes (yellow card) 33'; Hwang 75' (pen.); Lemina (yellow card) 84'	Stadium: Craven Cottage; Attendance: 24,366; Referee: Michael Salisbury

3 December 2023 14	Liverpool	4–3	Fulham	Liverpool
14:00 GMT	Leno 20' (o.g.); Mac Allister 38'; Endō 87'; Alexander-Arnold 88'	Report	Wilson 24'; Tete 45+3'; Decordova-Reid 80'	Stadium: Anfield; Attendance: 50,143; Referee: Stuart Attwell

6 December 2023 15	Fulham	5–0	Nottingham Forest	Fulham
19:30 GMT	Iwobi 30', 73'; Jiménez 34', 54'; Cairney 86'	Report	Yates (yellow card) 76'	Stadium: Craven Cottage; Attendance: 24,105; Referee: Josh Smith

10 December 2023 16	Fulham	5–0	West Ham United	Fulham
14:00 GMT	Jiménez 22'; Willian 31'; Adarabioyo 40'; Palhinha (yellow card) 45+1'; Wilson 60'; Ballo-Touré (yellow card) 75'; Carlos Vinícius 88'	Report	Cresswell (yellow card) 18'	Stadium: Craven Cottage; Attendance: 23,988; Referee: Paul Tierney

16 December 2023 17	Newcastle United	3–0	Fulham	Newcastle upon Tyne
15:00 GMT	Miley 57'; Almirón 64'; Burn 82'	Report	Jiménez (red card) 22'; Palhinha (yellow card) 70'; Decordova-Reid (yellow card) 81'	Stadium: St James' Park; Attendance: 52,055; Referee: Sam Barrott

23 December 2023 18	Fulham	0–2	Burnley	Fulham
15:00 GMT	Bassey (yellow card) 25'; Palhinha (yellow card) 58'	Report	Odobert 47'; Beyer (yellow card) 61'; Berge 66'	Stadium: Craven Cottage; Attendance: 23,598; Referee: Rebecca Welch

26 December 2023 19	Bournemouth	3–0	Fulham	Bournemouth
15:00 GMT	Kluivert 44'; Solanke 62' (pen.); Sinisterra 90+3'	Report	Leno (yellow card) 62'; Pereira (yellow card) 62'	Stadium: Dean Court; Attendance: 11,099; Referee: Tim Robinson

31 December 2023 20	Fulham	2–1	Arsenal	Fulham
14:00 GMT	Jiménez 29', (yellow card) 90+2'; Decordova-Reid 59'; Cairney (yellow card) 65'; Bassey (yellow card) 77'; Leno (yellow card) 90+6'	Report	Saka 5'; Saliba (yellow card) 87'	Stadium: Craven Cottage; Attendance: 24,444; Referee: Josh Smith

13 January 2024 21	Chelsea	1–0	Fulham	Fulham
12:30 GMT	Gusto (yellow card) 38'; Palmer 45+4' (pen.), (yellow card) 79'; Fernández (yellow card) 58'; Disasi (yellow card) 75'; Thiago Silva (yellow card) 79'	Report	Wilson (yellow card) 49'	Stadium: Stamford Bridge; Attendance: 39,643; Referee: Anthony Taylor

30 January 2024 22	Fulham	0–0	Everton	Fulham
19:45 GMT	Palhinha (yellow card) 26'	Report	Godfrey (yellow card) 28'; Branthwaite (yellow card) 42'	Stadium: Craven Cottage; Attendance: 24,376; Referee: Thomas Bramall

3 February 2024 23	Burnley	2–2	Fulham	Burnley
15:00 GMT	Fofana 71', 90+1', (yellow card) 90+2'; Berge (yellow card) 84'	Report	Palhinha 17'; Muniz 21'; Reed (yellow card) 43'; Pereira (yellow card) 45+3'	Stadium: Turf Moor; Attendance: 20,203; Referee: Darren Bond

10 February 2024 24	Fulham	3–1	Bournemouth	Fulham
15:00 GMT	Decordova-Reid 6'; Muniz 36', 52'; Wilson (yellow card) 90+4'	Report	Senesi 50'; Solanke (yellow card) 62'; Smith (yellow card) 81'	Stadium: Craven Cottage; Attendance: 24,271; Referee: Darren England

17 February 2024 25	Fulham	1–2	Aston Villa	Fulham
15:00 GMT	Muniz 63'; Palhinha (yellow card) 86'; Castagne (yellow card) 89'; Lukić (yellow card) 90'; Traoré (yellow card) 90+3'; Wilson (yellow card) 90+4'	Report	Watkins 23', 56'; McGinn (yellow card) 32'; Moreno (yellow card) 74'	Stadium: Craven Cottage; Attendance: 24,401; Referee: Lewis Smith

24 February 2024 26	Manchester United	1–2	Fulham	Manchester
15:00 GMT	Maguire (yellow card) 36', (goal) 89'; Fernandes (yellow card) 90+10'	Report	Adarabioyo (yellow card) 25'; Pereira (yellow card) 42'; Wilson (yellow card) 45+2'; Bassey 65'; Leno (yellow card) 90'; Iwobi 90+7'; Cairney (yellow card) 90+10'	Stadium: Old Trafford; Attendance: 73,487; Referee: Michael Oliver

2 March 2024 27	Fulham	3–0	Brighton & Hove Albion	Fulham
15:00 GMT	Wilson 21'; Muniz 32'; Decordova-Reid (yellow card) 89'; Traoré 90+1'	Report	Baleba (yellow card) 8'; Estupiñán (yellow card) 57'	Stadium: Craven Cottage; Attendance: 24,460; Referee: Simon Hooper

9 March 2024 28	Wolverhampton Wanderers	2–1	Fulham	Wolverhampton
15:00 GMT	Semedo (yellow card) 45'; Aït-Nouri 52'; S. Bueno (yellow card) 57'; Cairney 67' (o.g.)	Report	Reed (yellow card) 51'; Palhinha (yellow card) 72'; Iwobi 90+8'	Stadium: Molineux Stadium; Attendance: 30,860; Referee: Tony Harrington

16 March 2024 29	Fulham	3–0	Tottenham Hotspur	Fulham
17:30 GMT	Muniz 42', 60'; Lukić 49'; Palhinha (yellow card) 55'; Reed (yellow card) 90+6'	Report	Bissouma (yellow card) 63'; Johnson (yellow card) 79'; Bentancur (yellow card) 90+6'	Stadium: Craven Cottage; Attendance: 24,410; Referee: Robert Jones
Note: Fixture was originally scheduled for a 15:00 kick-off, but was pushed back for live Sky Sports coverage.

30 March 2024 30	Sheffield United	3–3	Fulham	Sheffield
15:00 GMT	Brereton 58', 70'; Holgate (yellow card) 61'; McBurnie 68'; Norwood (yellow card) 90+9'; Hamer (yellow card) 90+10'; Bogle (yellow card) 90+12'	Report	Palhinha 62'; Decordova-Reid 86'; Muniz 90+3'; Bassey (yellow card) 90+10'	Stadium: Bramall Lane; Attendance: 30,010; Referee: Tim Robinson

2 April 2024 31	Nottingham Forest	3–1	Fulham	West Bridgford
19:30 BST	Hudson-Odoi 9'; Wood 19'; Gibbs-White 45+3'; Turner (yellow card) 64'	Report	Adarabioyo 49'	Stadium: The City Ground; Attendance: 28,997; Referee: Michael Oliver
Note: Fixture was initially scheduled to kick-off at 19:45, but was moved for live TNT Sports broadcast.

6 April 2024 32	Fulham	0–1	Newcastle United	Fulham
15:00 BST	Lukić (yellow card) 68'	Report	Krafth (yellow card) 19'; Longstaff (yellow card) 51'; Bruno Guimarães 81'	Stadium: Craven Cottage; Attendance: 24,418; Referee: Sam Allison

13 April 2024 33	West Ham United	0–2	Fulham	Stratford
15:00 BST	Paquetá (yellow card) 90+7'	Report	Pereira 9', 72', (yellow card) 61'; Decordova-Reid (yellow card) 81'	Stadium: London Stadium; Attendance: 62,459; Referee: Stuart Attwell

21 April 2024 34	Fulham	1–3	Liverpool	Fulham
16:30 BST	Palhinha (yellow card) 30'; Adarabioyo (yellow card) 39'; Castagne 45+2', (yellow card) 79'	Report	Alexander-Arnold 32'; Gravenberch 53'; Jota 72'	Stadium: Craven Cottage; Attendance: 24,401; Referee: Craig Pawson
Note: Fixture was initially scheduled for 20 April, but was moved for live Sky Sports coverage.

27 April 2024 35	Fulham	1–1	Crystal Palace	Fulham
15:00 BST	Muniz 52'	Report	Hughes (yellow card) 83'; Schlupp 87'; Andersen (yellow card) 90+1'	Stadium: Craven Cottage; Attendance: 24,142; Referee: Stuart Attwell

4 May 2024 36	Brentford	0–0	Fulham	Brentford
15:00 BST	Reguilón (yellow card) 67'	Report	Bassey (yellow card) 89'	Stadium: Gtech Community Stadium; Attendance: 17,090; Referee: Graham Scott

11 May 2024 37	Fulham	0–4	Manchester City	Fulham
12:30 BST	Diop (yellow card) 78' (yellow-red card) 90+5'; Robinson (yellow card) 90'	Report	Gvardiol 13', 71'; Foden 59'; Álvarez 90+6' (pen.)	Stadium: Craven Cottage; Attendance: 24,418; Referee: Anthony Taylor

19 May 2024 38	Luton Town	2–4	Fulham	Luton
16:00 BST	Sambi Lokonga (yellow card) 34'; Morris 45+1' (pen.), (yellow card) 73'; Clark (yellow card) 48'; Doughty 55', (yellow card) 59'; Johnson (yellow card) 75'	Report	Reed (yellow card) 22'; Traoré 43', (yellow card) 73'; Jiménez 45+3', 49'; Robinson (yellow card) 54'; Wilson 69'; Cairney (yellow card) 88'	Stadium: Kenilworth Road; Attendance: 12,027; Referee: Matt Donohue

=== FA Cup ===
As a Premier League side, Fulham entered in the third round, and were drawn at home to Rotherham United. They were then drawn at home to Newcastle United in the fourth round.

Win Draw Loss Fixtures

5 January 2024 Third round	Fulham	1–0	Rotherham United	Fulham
19:30 GMT	Decordova-Reid 24'	Report		Stadium: Craven Cottage; Attendance: 15,083; Referee: Simon Hooper

27 January 2024 Fourth round	Fulham	0–2	Newcastle United	Fulham
19:00 GMT		Report	Schär (yellow card) 20'; Longstaff 39'; Burn 61'	Stadium: Craven Cottage; Attendance: 18,960; Referee: Jarred Gillett

=== EFL Cup ===
Fulham entered the competition in the second round, and were drawn at home to Tottenham Hotspur. They were then drawn at home to Norwich City in the third round, away to Ipswich Town in the fourth round, and away to Everton in the quarter-finals. In the two-legged semi-finals, they were drawn against Liverpool.

Win Draw Loss Fixtures

29 August 2023 Second round	Fulham	1–1 (5–3 p)	Tottenham Hotspur	Fulham
19:45 BST	Van de Ven 19' (o.g.)	Report	Richarlison 56'; Skipp (yellow card) 63'; Van de Ven (yellow card) 76'	Stadium: Craven Cottage; Attendance: 21,043; Referee: Josh Smith
	Penalties
	Pereira (penalty scored); Jiménez (penalty scored); Wilson (penalty scored); Palhinha (penalty scored); Tete (penalty scored)		(penalty scored) Son; (penalty scored) Kulusevski; (penalty missed) Sánchez; (penalty scored) Maddison

26 September 2023 Third round	Fulham	2–1	Norwich City	Fulham
19:45 BST	Carlos Vinícius 12'; Iwobi 72'; Muniz (yellow card) 90+1'	Report	McCallum (yellow card) 16'; Płacheta (yellow card) 45'; Sainz 75'; Warner (yellow card) 77'	Stadium: Craven Cottage; Attendance: 12,831; Referee: Craig Pawson

1 November 2023 Fourth round	Ipswich Town	1–3	Fulham	Ipswich
19:45 GMT	Harness (yellow card) 32'; Taylor (yellow card) 38'; Baggott 79'	Report	Wilson 9'; Lukić (yellow card) 38'; Muniz 50'; Cairney 77'; Jiménez (yellow card) 86'; Reed (yellow card) 89'	Stadium: Portman Road; Attendance: 28,221; Referee: Lewis Smith

19 December 2023 Quarter-finals	Everton	1–1 (6–7 p)	Fulham	Liverpool
19:45 GMT	Keane (yellow card) 39'; Patterson (yellow card) 50'; Beto 82'	Report	Keane 41' (o.g.); Tete (yellow card) 64'	Stadium: Goodison Park; Attendance: 38,715; Referee: Graham Scott
	Penalties
	Beto (penalty scored); McNeil (penalty scored); Keane (penalty scored); Danjuma (penalty scored); Onana (penalty missed); Tarkowski (penalty scored); Garner (penalty scored); Gueye (penalty missed)		(penalty scored) Pereira; (penalty scored) Cairney; (penalty scored) Palhinha; (penalty missed) Decordova-Reid; (penalty scored) Carlos Vinícius; (penalty scored) Tete; (penalty scored) Robinson; (penalty scored) Adarabioyo

10 January 2024 Semi-finals First leg	Liverpool	2–1	Fulham	Liverpool
20:00 GMT	Van Dijk (yellow card) 24'; Jones 68'; Gakpo 71'	Report	Willian 19'; Lukić (yellow card) 88'; Wilson (yellow card) 90+1'	Stadium: Anfield; Attendance: 56,724; Referee: David Coote

24 January 2024 Semi-finals Second leg	Fulham	1–1 (2–3 agg.)	Liverpool	Fulham
20:00 GMT	Cairney (yellow card) 42'; Diop 76', (yellow card) 78'; Wilson (yellow card) 90+5'	Report	Díaz 11'; Kelleher (yellow card) 90+3'	Stadium: Craven Cottage; Attendance: 24,320; Referee: Simon Hooper

== Squad statistics ==
=== Appearances and goals ===
- Players listed with no appearances have been in the matchday squad but only as unused substitutes.

No.	Pos	Nat	Player	Total		Premier League		FA Cup		EFL Cup	
No.	Pos	Nat	Player	Apps	Goals	Apps	Goals	Apps	Goals	Apps	Goals
Goalkeepers
1	GK	(Slovakia) SVK	Marek Rodák	5	0	0	0	2	0	3	0
17	GK	(Germany) GER	Bernd Leno	41	0	38	0	0	0	3	0
23	GK	(Germany) GER	Steven Benda	0	0	0	0	0	0	0	0
Defenders
2	RB	(Netherlands) NED	Kenny Tete	19	1	10+4	1	2	0	2+1	0
3	CB	(Nigeria) NGR	Calvin Bassey	32	1	25+4	1	0	0	3	0
4	CB	(England) ENG	Tosin Adarabioyo	25	2	18+2	2	1+1	0	3	0}
12	LB	(Senegal) SEN	Fodé Ballo-Touré	8	0	0+6	0	0	0	2	0
13	CB	(United States) USA	Tim Ream	21	1	17+1	1	1	0	1+1	0
21	RB	(Belgium) BEL	Timothy Castagne	39	1	29+5	1	1	0	4	0
31	CB	(France) FRA	Issa Diop	25	1	16+2	0	2	0	4+1	1
33	LB	(United States) USA	Antonee Robinson	44	0	37	0	1+1	0	4+1	0
41	RB	(Colombia) COL	Devan Tanton	1	0	0	0	0	0	0+1	0
44	CB	(Canada) CAN	Luc de Fougerolles	1	0	0	0	0	0	1	0
Midfielders
6	CM	(England) ENG	Harrison Reed	34	0	15+12	0	2	0	3+2	0
10	CM	(Scotland) SCO	Tom Cairney	42	2	14+20	1	0+2	0	4+2	1
14	AM	(Jamaica) JAM	Bobby Decordova-Reid	41	7	17+16	6	2	1	4+2	0
18	AM	(Brazil) BRA	Andreas Pereira	44	3	34+3	3	2	0	3+2	0
22	AM	(Nigeria) NGR	Alex Iwobi	33	6	25+5	5	0	0	2+1	1
26	DM	(Portugal) POR	João Palhinha	39	4	31+2	4	0+1	0	5	0
28	CM	(Serbia) SRB	Saša Lukić	28	1	13+11	1	2	0	1+1	0
49	CM	(New Zealand) NZL	Matt Dibley-Dias	0	0	0	0	0	0	0	0
57	AM	(Switzerland) SUI	Kristian Šekularac	0	0	0	0	0	0	0	0
62	CM	(England) ENG	Joshua King	0	0	0	0	0	0	0	0
Forwards
7	CF	(Mexico) MEX	Raúl Jiménez	29	7	18+6	7	0+1	0	2+2	0
8	RW	(Wales) WAL	Harry Wilson	43	5	16+19	4	2	0	3+3	1
9	CF	(Albania) ALB	Armando Broja	8	0	0+8	0	0	0	0	0
11	RW	(Spain) ESP	Adama Traoré	18	2	1+16	2	0	0	1	0
19	CF	(Brazil) BRA	Rodrigo Muniz	33	10	18+8	9	2	0	3+2	1
20	LW	(Brazil) BRA	Willian	37	5	24+7	4	0+2	0	4	1
Out on loan
27	RB	(Switzerland) SUI	Kevin Mbabu	0	0	0	0	0	0	0	0
30	CF	(Brazil) BRA	Carlos Vinícius	16	3	2+11	2	0+1	0	1+1	1
35	CM	(Australia) AUS	Tyrese Francois	2	0	0	0	0+1	0	0+1	0
38	CM	(Wales) WAL	Luke Harris	2	0	0+1	0	0	0	0+1	0
65	CF	(England) ENG	Jay Stansfield	0	0	0	0	0	0	0	0
Left the club during the season
9	CF	(Serbia) SRB	Aleksandar Mitrović	1	0	0+1	0	0	0	0	0

Last updated: 19 May 2024
Source: Competitions, Soccerway

=== Top scorers ===
Includes all competitive matches. The list is sorted by squad number when total goals are equal.

Last updated 19 May 2024

Rank	No.	Nat.	Player	Premier League	FA Cup	EFL Cup	Total
1	19	(Brazil)	Rodrigo Muniz	9	0	1	10
2	7	(Mexico)	Raúl Jiménez	7	0	0	7
2	14	(Jamaica)	Bobby Decordova-Reid	6	1	0	7
4	22	(Nigeria)	Alex Iwobi	5	0	1	6
5	8	(Wales)	Harry Wilson	4	0	1	5
5	20	(Brazil)	Willian	4	0	1	5
7	26	(Portugal)	João Palhinha	4	0	0	4
8	18	(Brazil)	Andreas Pereira	3	0	0	3
8	30	(Brazil)	Carlos Vinícius	2	0	1	3
10	4	(England)	Tosin Adarabioyo	2	0	0	2
10	10	(Scotland)	Tom Cairney	1	0	1	2
10	11	(Spain)	Adama Traoré	2	0	0	2
13	2	(Netherlands)	Kenny Tete	1	0	0	1
13	3	(Nigeria)	Calvin Bassey	1	0	0	1
13	13	(United States)	Tim Ream	1	0	0	1
13	21	(Belgium)	Timothy Castagne	1	0	0	1
13	28	(Serbia)	Saša Lukić	1	0	0	1
13	31	(France)	Issa Diop	0	0	1	1
Own goals				1	0	2	3
Totals				55	1	9	65
