= Luciano D'Auria-Henry =

English footballer (born 2002)

Personal information
- Full name: Luciano Paul D'Auria-Henry
- Date of birth: 11 November 2002 (age 23)
- Place of birth: Ealing, England
- Height: 1.74 m (5 ft 9 in)
- Position: Wing back

Youth career
- 2013–2023: Fulham

Senior career*
Years	Team	Apps	(Gls)
2023–2024	Fulham	0	(0)
2023–2024	→ Cheltenham Town (loan)	3	(0)
2024–2025	Farnborough	23	(0)
2025–2026	Walton & Hersham	9	(0)
- * Club domestic league appearances and goals as of 18:17, 18 July 2026 (UTC)

Luciano Paul D'Auria-Henry (born 11 November 2002) is an English professional footballer who last played for Walton & Hersham, as a wing back.

== Career ==
Born in Ealing, D'Auria-Henry began his career with Fulham, signing for the club at under-11. In July 2023 he signed a new contract with the club. He moved on loan to Cheltenham Town in August 2023. Having failed to feature since the appointment of new manager Darrell Clarke, he was one of six loan players to be sent back to his parent club on 2 January 2024.

On 23 November 2024, following his release from Fulham in the summer, D'Auria-Henry joined National League South side Farnborough. On 26 October 2025, it was announced that D’Auria-Henry would depart the club after his contract was terminated.

On 30 October 2025, following his departure from Farnborough, D'Auria-Henry agreed to join Southern League Premier Division South side, Walton & Hersham.

== Personal life ==
D'Auria-Henry is of Italian and Dominican Republic descent.

== Playing style ==
D'Auria-Henry began playing as a winger, converting to a wing back at under-16.

== Career statistics ==
As of match played 25 April 2026

Appearances and goals by club, season and competition
Club	Season	League			FA Cup		EFL Cup		Other		Total	
Club	Season	Division	Apps	Goals	Apps	Goals	Apps	Goals	Apps	Goals	Apps	Goals
Fulham	2023–24	Premier League	0	0	0	0	0	0	—		0	0
Cheltenham Town (loan)	2023–24	League One	3	0	0	0	0	0	0	0	3	0
Farnborough	2024–25	National League South	15	0	—		—		—		15	0
Farnborough	2025–26	National League South	8	0	2	0	—		0	0	10	0
Farnborough	Total		23	0	2	0	—		0	0	25	0
Walton & Hersham	2025–26	Southern League Premier Division South	9	0	—		—		1 (Note: Appearance in the FA Trophy)	0	10	0
Career total			35	0	2	0	0	0	1	0	38	0
