= Adama Traoré (footballer, born 1996) =

Spanish footballer (born 1996)

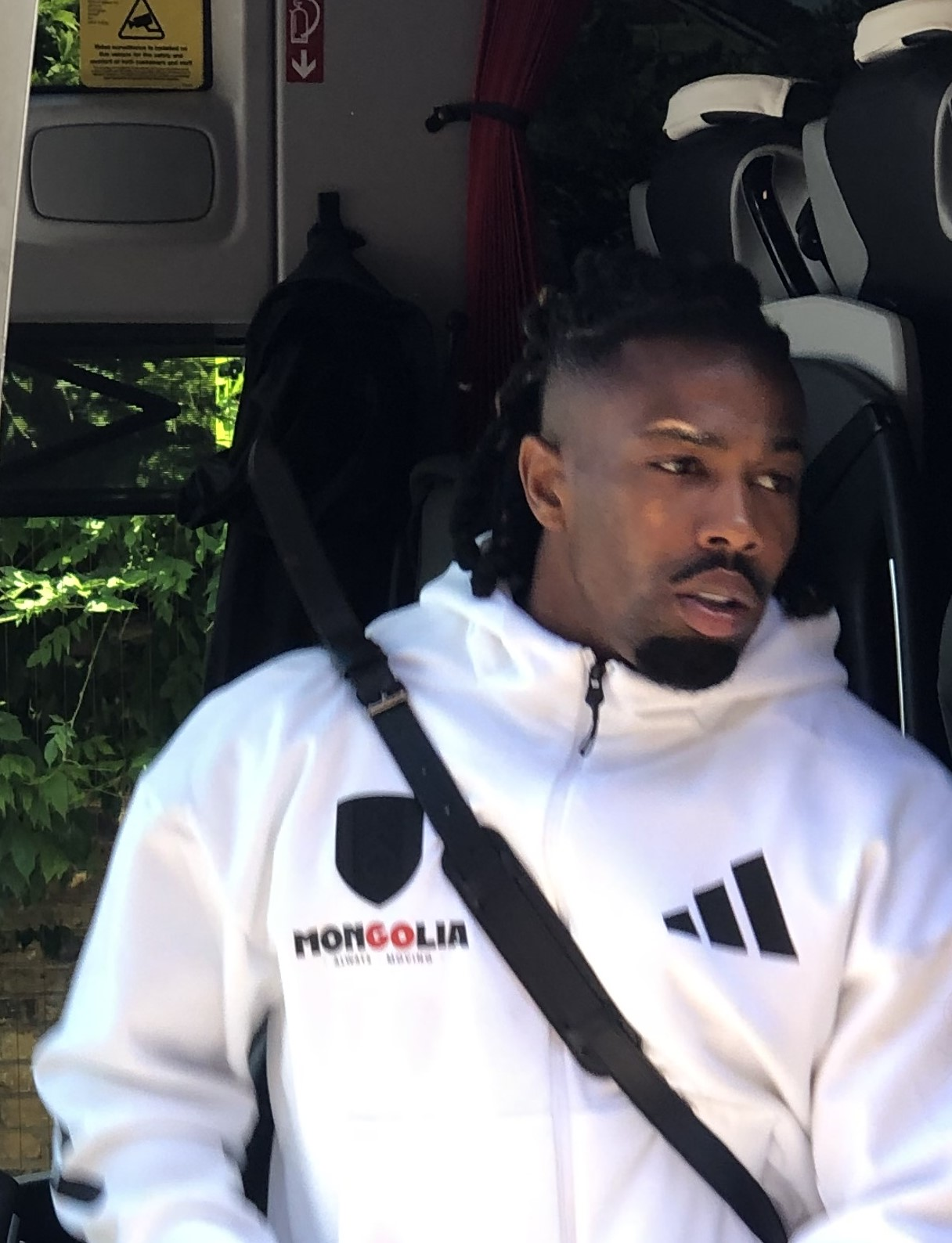
- Traoré with Fulham in 2024

Personal information
- Full name: Adama Traoré Diarra
- Date of birth: 25 January 1996 (age 30)
- Place of birth: L'Hospitalet de Llobregat, Spain
- Height: 1.78 m (5 ft 10 in)
- Position: Right winger

Team information
- Current team: Deportivo A Coruña
- Number: 24

Youth career
- L'Hospitalet
- 2004–2013: Barcelona

Senior career*
Years	Team	Apps	(Gls)
2013–2015	Barcelona B	63	(8)
2013–2015	Barcelona	1	(0)
2015–2016	Aston Villa	11	(0)
2016–2018	Middlesbrough	61	(5)
2018–2023	Wolverhampton Wanderers	157	(10)
2022	→ Barcelona (loan)	11	(0)
2023–2026	Fulham	68	(4)
2026	West Ham United	9	(0)
2026–	Deportivo A Coruña	10	(0)

International career
2012	Spain U16	5	(0)
2012–2013	Spain U17	5	(1)
2013–2014	Spain U19	6	(0)
2018	Spain U21	2	(0)
2020–2021	Spain	8	(0)
Medal record
Men's football
Representing Spain
UEFA European Championship
Bronze medal – third place	2020 Europe
- * Club domestic league appearances and goals as of 23:17, 21 November 2026 (UTC)

Adama Traoré Diarra (born 25 January 1996), also known simply as Adama, is a Spanish professional footballer who plays as a right winger for La Liga club Deportivo La Coruña.

Traoré began his club career with Barcelona, appearing mainly for the reserves. In 2015, he signed for Aston Villa and a year later Middlesbrough, before joining Wolverhampton Wanderers in August 2018. He played 201 games for Wolves, scoring 14 times, and was loaned back to Barcelona in January 2022 before joining Fulham a year and a half later. He joined West Ham United in January 2026.

Traoré has represented Spain internationally at both youth and senior levels, making his senior debut for the Spain national team in 2020. He also made the squad for UEFA Euro 2020.

Traoré is known by football fans for his defined physique and exceptional running speed.

== Club career ==
=== Barcelona ===
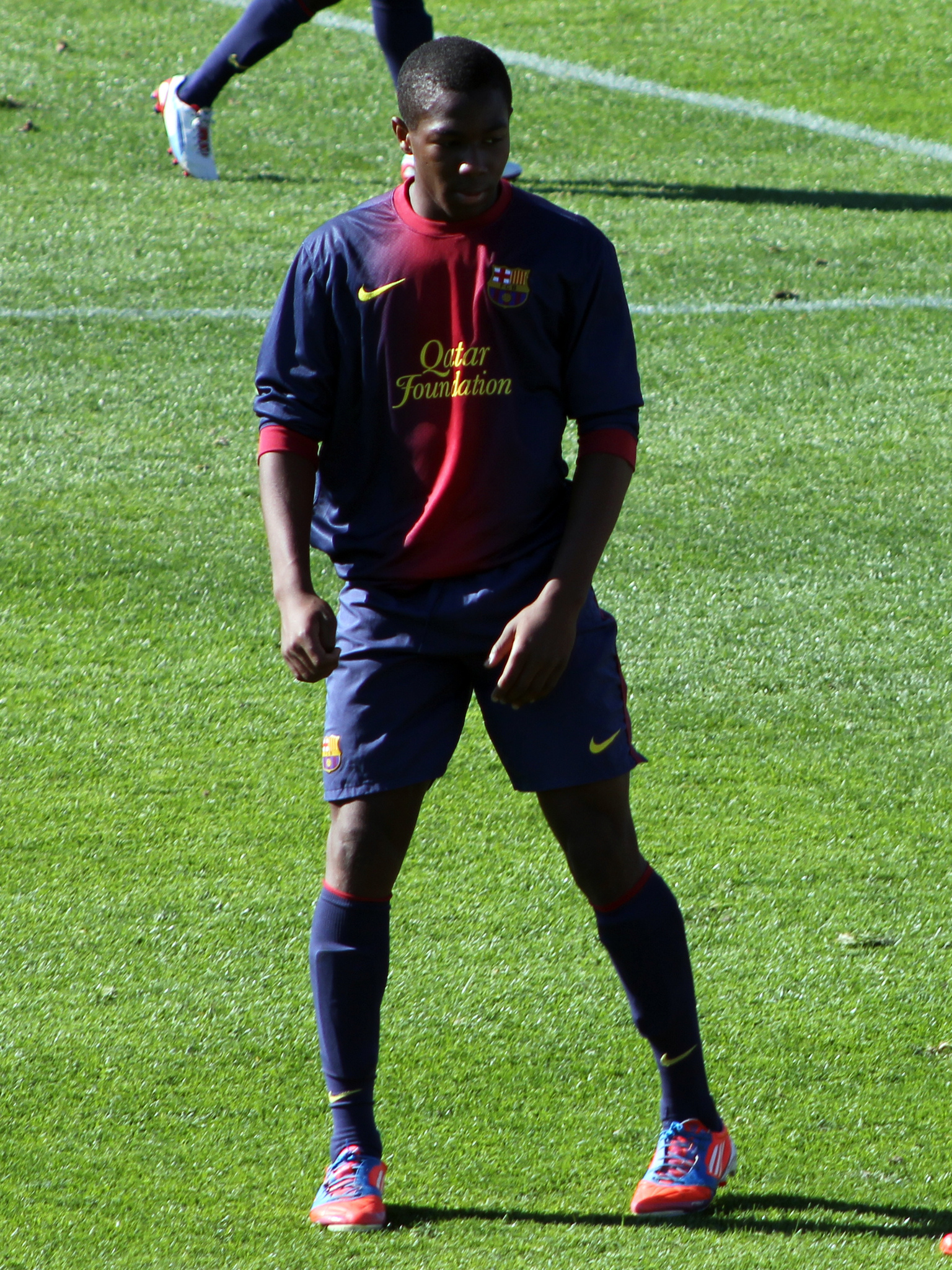
Traoré playing for Barcelona B in 2012

Traoré was born in L'Hospitalet de Llobregat, Barcelona, Catalonia, to Malian parents. He joined Barcelona's youth setup in 2004 at the age of eight, after a brief period with neighbouring L'Hospitalet. In 2013 he was promoted to the B-team, and made his debut on 6 October in a 0–1 away defeat against Ponferradina in the Segunda División championship.

On 9 November 2013, Traoré came on as a half-time substitute but was sent off for conceding a penalty in a 0–3 loss to Real Jaén at the Mini Estadi. Two weeks later, he played his first La Liga game at the age of 17, replacing Neymar late on in the 4–0 home win over Granada; he made his first appearance in the UEFA Champions League on 26 November, coming on for Cesc Fàbregas in the 82nd minute of a 1–2 defeat away to Ajax in the group stage.

Traoré also featured for Barcelona's under-19 side in the inaugural edition of the UEFA Youth League, playing five games and scoring twice as they won the trophy. He scored his first official goal for Barcelona's first team on 16 December 2014, playing 16 minutes and contributing in an 8–1 home victory over Huesca in the 2014–15 Copa del Rey.

=== Aston Villa ===
On 14 August 2015, Traoré joined Premier League club Aston Villa on a five-year deal for a reported £7 million (€10 million) that could rise to €12 million, with Barcelona inserting a three-year buy-back clause in his contract. He made his debut eight days later against Crystal Palace, contributing to a lone own goal as Villa were defeated 2–1. He scored his first goal three days later, the team's first of a 5–3 home win over Notts County in the second round of the League Cup.

Traoré came on as a second-half substitute for a bottom-of-the-table Villa side away to relegation rivals Sunderland on 2 January 2016, and assisted compatriot Carles Gil's equaliser – he was later substituted himself through injury, and Sunderland won 3–1. Following that game, he was dropped from the team due to ill discipline, as Villa ended the season relegated, in last place, on 17 points.

=== Middlesbrough ===
On 31 August 2016, Traoré signed a four-year contract with Middlesbrough and Albert Adomah moved in the opposite direction; the fees were undisclosed. He made his debut on 10 September 2016 in a 1–2 home loss to Crystal Palace, replacing Cristhian Stuani for the final nine minutes; during his first season, he took part in 31 matches without scoring.

Traoré played well in 2017–18, first under Garry Monk and then Tony Pulis, with his pace sometimes causing several problems for opposition defenders, including an impressive performance against Leeds United on 2 March 2018 in a 3–0 win. He totalled five goals and ten assists during the campaign as his team reached the play-offs in the Championship, where they were knocked out by his former side Aston Villa; he won Middlesbrough's Fans' Player of the Year, Young Player of the Year and Players' Player of the Year awards.

=== Wolverhampton Wanderers ===
On 8 August 2018, Traoré joined newly promoted Wolverhampton Wanderers on a five-year deal for an undisclosed fee in the region of £18 million. He scored his first goal for the team and in the Premier League on 1 September – in his 40th appearance in the competition – in a 1–0 win away to West Ham United. His first start occurred on 27 October, in a 0–1 away defeat to Brighton & Hove Albion.

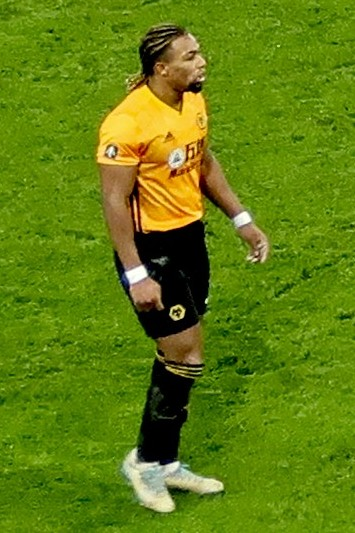
Traore playing for Wolverhampton Wanderers in a match against Manchester United in 2020.

On 6 October 2019, in his 50th competitive appearance for Wolves, Traoré scored both goals in a 2–0 away victory against reigning champions Manchester City. He scored his first goal in a European competition as Wolves drew 3–3 away to Braga in the UEFA Europa League group stage on 28 November.

Traoré scored his debut Molineux goal for the club in a 1–2 defeat to Tottenham Hotspur in the Premier League on 15 December 2019. He won the PFA Player of the Month award for January 2020 with 45 per cent of fan votes.

Traoré's first goal for Wolves in the 2020–21 season came in their 1–0 home victory over Crystal Palace in a FA Cup third-round game on 8 January 2021. He marked his 100th Premier League appearance for Wolves with his tenth goal for the club in a 2–1 victory over Brighton & Hove Albion at Molineux on 9 May 2021. He scored his debut goal of the 2021–22 season on 15 January 2022, in a 3–1 Premier League victory over Southampton at Molineux.

On 29 January 2022, Traoré joined Barcelona on loan for the rest of the season, with the option of a permanent deal possible. As Barcelona did not take up the option, he returned to Wolves at the season's end.

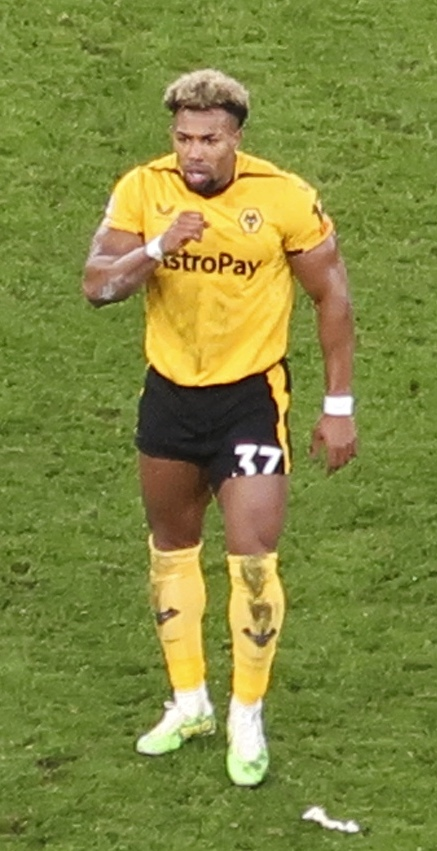
Traoré with Wolves in 2023

Traoré's first start for Wolves in the 2022–23 season after his loan at Barcelona in the second-half of the 2021–22 season came in a 2–1 victory over Preston North End at Molineux in the EFL Cup on 23 August 2022, in which he scored Wolves's second. He scored his 10th Premier League goal (and 14th goal for Wolves in total) on 4 March 2023, ensuring a 1–0 home win against Tottenham Hotspur.

On 3 June 2023, Wolves announced Traoré would leave the club at the expiration of his contract.

=== Fulham ===
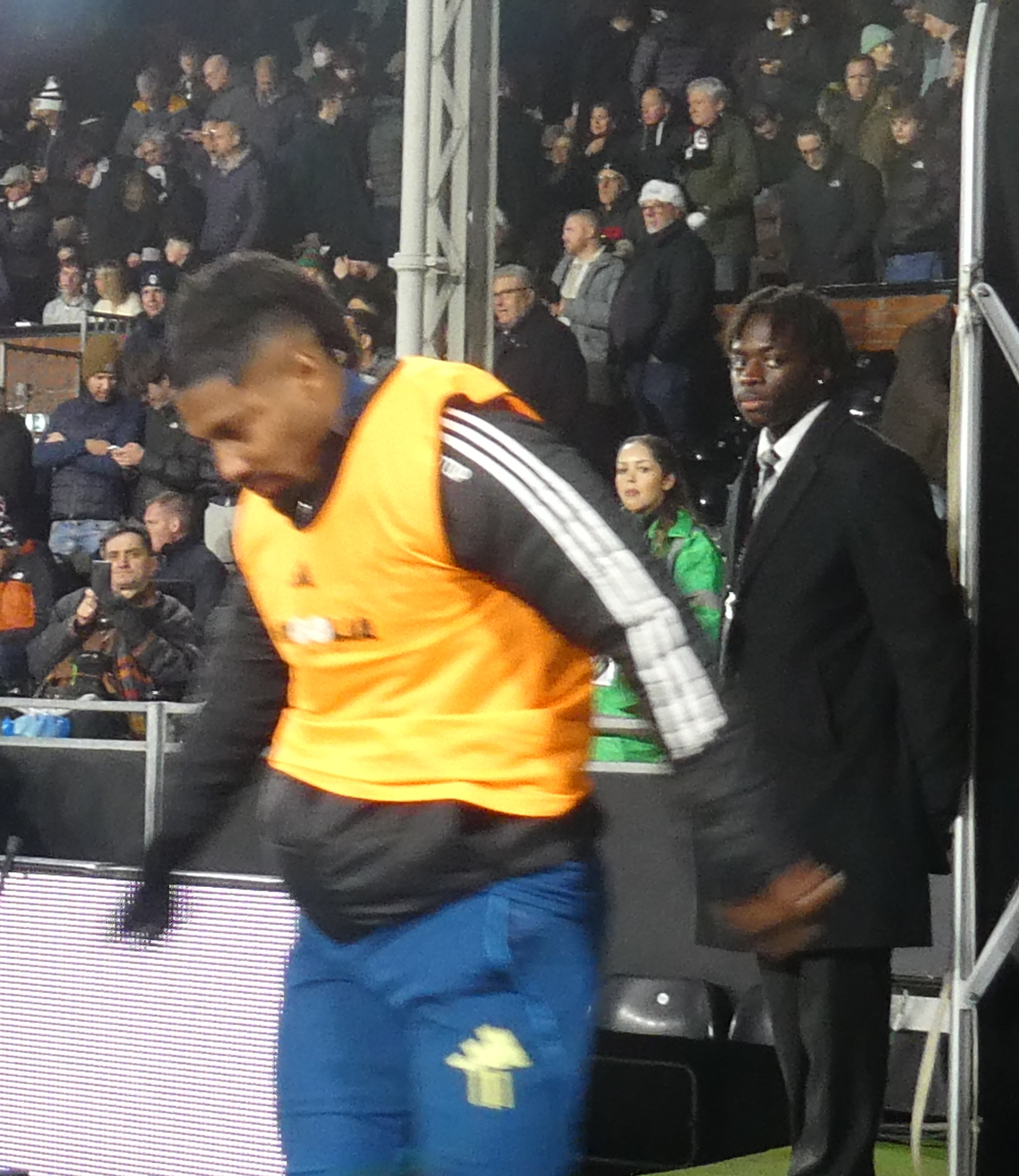
Traoré with Fulham in 2025

On 12 August 2023, Traoré joined fellow Premier League club Fulham on a free transfer. He signed a two-year deal with the option of a third. On 2 March 2024, Traoré scored his first goal for Fulham of the season, scoring the third goal in a 3–0 victory over Brighton.

=== West Ham United ===
On 28 January 2026, Traoré moved to fellow London club West Ham United on a short-term deal, reuniting with former Wolves manager Nuno Espírito Santo. On 10 June, West Ham announced that he would be released in the wake of the team's relegation to the EFL Championship.

=== Deportivo A Coruña ===
On 26 August 2026, Traoré returned to Spain, as it was announced that Deportivo de A Coruña signed him on a two-year contract.

== International career ==
Traoré was eligible to represent Spain, his country of birth, and Mali through his parents, On 17 February 2014, the Malian Football Federation reported that Traoré and his older brother Moha had decided to represent Mali at senior level. However, in an interview with BBC Sport in October 2015, the former stated that he was still considering his international options. He made his debut for the Spanish under-21s on 22 March 2018, playing 15 minutes in the 5–3 away win over Northern Ireland in the 2019 UEFA European Championship qualifiers.

In November 2019, Traoré declared that he wanted to play for Mali. However, days later he received his first call-up in the Spain national team for Euro 2020 qualifying matches against Malta and Romania in place of injured Rodrigo. He pulled out of the squad voluntarily due to injury, and was replaced by Pablo Sarabia.

In January 2020, he said he had not decided between Spain and Mali after a photograph of him posing with a Mali shirt circulated online, saying "I am grateful (to have the chance) with the two international teams – Spain where I was born and Mali where my origins are."

In August 2020, Traoré was again called up ahead of Spain's September UEFA Nations League matches against Germany and Ukraine. However, he was removed from the squad after testing positive for COVID-19 on 31 August. He missed the Germany match as he awaited the result of the second test to determine if the initial result was a false positive. The second test result was negative and Traoré rejoined the squad on 3 September, ahead of the Ukraine match. On 6 September, Traoré was once again ordered to leave the camp after a PCR test showed a high antibody count.

On 7 October 2020, Traoré made his first appearance for Spain in a friendly match against Portugal, coming on as a substitute in the 62nd minute. The match ended in a scoreless draw. On 10 October, Traoré again came on as a substitute for Spain in a Nations League match against Switzerland. Both Mali and Spain had named Traoré to their respective squads for their matches during the October international fixture window, but with his appearance in a competitive match against Switzerland, he is cap-tied to Spain and FIFA eligibility rules prevents him from representing Mali.

On 24 May 2021, he was included in Luis Enrique's 24-man squad for UEFA Euro 2020. The team reached the semi-finals, though his input was limited to 14 minutes as a substitute in a group win over Slovakia.

== Style of play ==
Tim Sherwood, Traoré's manager at Villa, compared him to both Lionel Messi and Cristiano Ronaldo, saying he had "a bit" of both. Catherine Wilson of ESPN FC credited his "athleticism", though also remarked that his "footballing brain and teamwork skills are definitely up for debate" as he can only run in a straight line.

In 2018, ESPN's Matt Stanger acknowledged Traoré's pace and strength, and added that he was "now showing the composure to find the killer pass", while boasting "rapid acceleration" and "excellent close control to shield the ball from defenders"; Stanger also believed Traoré's "defensive contribution" to be developed, pointing his key weaknesses as "moments of recklessness" and "decision-making" which "continues to frustrate his teammates"; he was also described by Teesside Gazette's Philip Tallentire as a 'talismanic playmaker', after his form during the 2017–18 season. The Daily Mirror listed Traoré second in the top 10 fastest players of the 2019–20 Premier League season, with a top speed of 23.48 mph.

While with Wolverhampton Wanderers, after his first three appearances as a substitute, Michael Butler of The Guardian reported: "Traoré has always been regarded as a rough diamond, lightning quick but perhaps lacking composure or an end product. ... Per 90 minutes, nobody in the Premier League has created more chances than the 22-year-old or completed even half the number of successful dribbles: Eden Hazard has 5.56 to Traoré's 11.87.

== Personal life ==
Traoré was born in L'Hospitalet de Llobregat, Barcelona, Catalonia, to Malian parents. His elder brother, Moha, is also a footballer. He is also a practising Muslim.

== Career statistics ==
=== Club ===
As of match played 21 November 2026

Appearances and goals by club, season and competition
Club	Season	League			National cup (Note: Includes Copa del Rey, FA Cup)		League cup (Note: Includes Football League/EFL Cup)		Europe		Other		Total	
Club	Season	Division	Apps	Goals	Apps	Goals	Apps	Goals	Apps	Goals	Apps	Goals	Apps	Goals
Barcelona B	2013–14	Segunda División	26	5	—		—		—		—		26	5
Barcelona B	2014–15	Segunda División	37	3	—		—		—		—		37	3
Barcelona B	Total		63	8	—		—		—		—		63	8
Barcelona	2013–14	La Liga	1	0	0	0	—		1 (Note: Appearance in UEFA Champions League)	0	0	0	2	0
Barcelona	2014–15	La Liga	0	0	2	1	—		0	0	—		2	1
Barcelona	Total		1	0	2	1	—		1	0	0	0	4	1
Aston Villa	2015–16	Premier League	10	0	0	0	1	1	—		—		11	1
Aston Villa	2016–17	Championship	1	0	—		—		—		—		1	0
Aston Villa	Total		11	0	0	0	1	1	—		—		12	1
Middlesbrough	2016–17	Premier League	27	0	4	0	—		—		—		31	0
Middlesbrough	2017–18	Championship	34	5	2	0	2	0	—		2 (Note: Appearances in Championship play-offs)	0	40	5
Middlesbrough	Total		61	5	6	0	2	0	—		2	0	71	5
Wolverhampton Wanderers	2018–19	Premier League	29	1	5	0	2	0	—		—		36	1
Wolverhampton Wanderers	2019–20	Premier League	37	4	2	0	0	0	15 (Note: Appearances in UEFA Europa League)	2	—		54	6
Wolverhampton Wanderers	2020–21	Premier League	37	2	3	1	1	0	—		—		41	3
Wolverhampton Wanderers	2021–22	Premier League	20	1	1	0	2	0	—		—		23	1
Wolverhampton Wanderers	2022–23	Premier League	34	2	2	0	4	1	—		—		40	3
Wolverhampton Wanderers	Total		157	10	13	1	9	1	15	2	—		194	14
Barcelona (loan)	2021–22	La Liga	11	0	—		—		6	0	—		17	0
Fulham	2023–24	Premier League	17	2	0	0	1	0	—		—		18	2
Fulham	2024–25	Premier League	36	2	4	0	1	0	—		—		41	2
Fulham	2025–26	Premier League	15	0	1	0	4	0	—		—		20	0
Fulham	Total		68	4	5	0	6	0	—		—		79	4
West Ham United	2025–26	Premier League	9	0	3	0	—		—		—		12	0
Deportivo A Coruña	2026–27	La Liga	10	0	1	0	—		—		—		11	0
Career total			391	27	30	2	18	2	22	2	2	0	463	33

=== International ===
Appearances and goals by national team and year
National team	Year	Apps	Goals
Spain	2020	5	0
Spain	2021	3	0
Total		8	0

== Honours ==
Barcelona Youth

- UEFA Youth League: 2013–14

Barcelona

- Copa del Rey: 2014–15

Individual

- Segunda División Team of the Year: 2013–14
- Middlesbrough Fans' Player of the Year: 2017–18
- Middlesbrough Players' Player of the Year: 2017–18
- Middlesbrough Young Player of the Year: 2017–18
- PFA Player of the Month: January 2020
