= Alex Iwobi =

Nigerian footballer (born 1996)

- Iwobi in 2026

Personal information
- Full name: Alexander Chuka Iwobi
- Date of birth: 3 May 1996 (age 30)
- Place of birth: Lagos, Nigeria
- Height: 1.80 m (5 ft 11 in)
- Position: Midfielder

Team information
- Current team: Fulham
- Number: 17

Youth career
- 2004–2015: Arsenal

Senior career*
Years	Team	Apps	(Gls)
2015–2019	Arsenal	100	(11)
2019–2023	Everton	123	(6)
2023–	Fulham	108	(19)

International career^{‡}
2011–2012	England U16	7	(1)
2013	England U17	3	(0)
2013	England U18	1	(0)
2015–	Nigeria	103	(10)
Medal record
Men's football
Representing Nigeria
Africa Cup of Nations
Runner-up	2023 Ivory Coast
Third place	2019 Egypt
Third place	2025 Morocco
- * Club domestic league appearances and goals as of 08:33, 22 November 2026 (UTC) ‡ National team caps and goals as of 18:00, 17 November 2026 (UTC)

Alexander Chuka Iwobi MON (/ɪˈwoʊbi/ ih-WOH-bee; born 3 May 1996) is a Nigerian professional footballer who plays as a midfielder for Premier League club Fulham and the Nigeria national team.

Iwobi began his career at Arsenal, with whom he won the FA Cup in 2017 and finished as runner-up for the EFL Cup in 2018 and UEFA Europa League in 2019. In 2019, Iwobi transferred to Everton, and in 2023 he joined Fulham.

Iwobi represented England up to under-18 level. He made his senior international debut for Nigeria in October 2015, and was part of their squads at the FIFA World Cup in 2018 and the Africa Cup of Nations in 2019 (finishing third), 2021, 2023 (being runner-up) and 2025 (finishing third).

== Early life ==
Iwobi was born in Lagos before moving to England at the age of four, following a brief stay in Turkey, and grew up in Newham, London. His maternal uncle is former professional footballer Jay-Jay Okocha. His father, Chuba Iwobi, was also a footballer.

== Club career ==
=== Arsenal ===
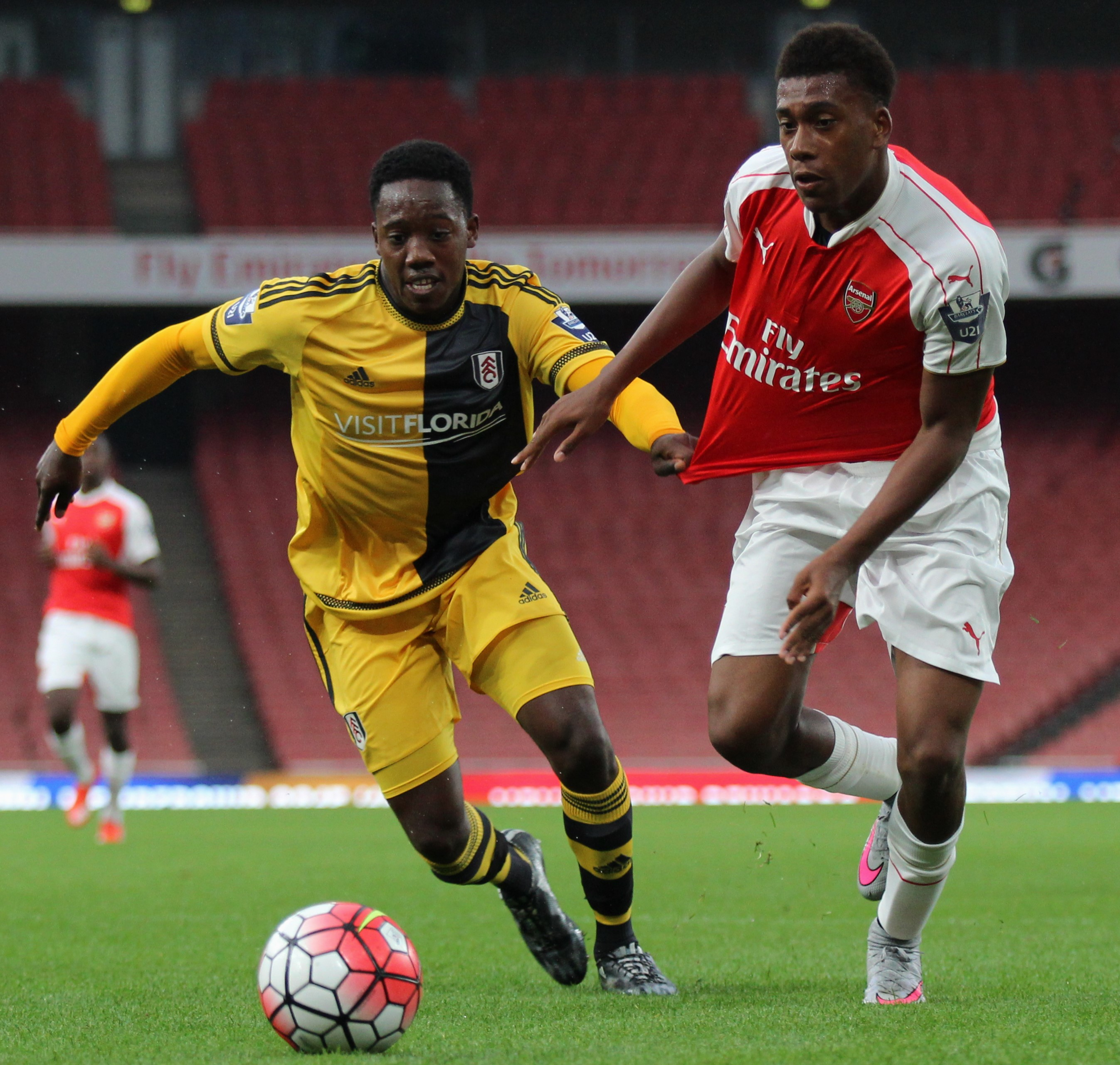
Iwobi (right) playing for Arsenal U21s in 2015

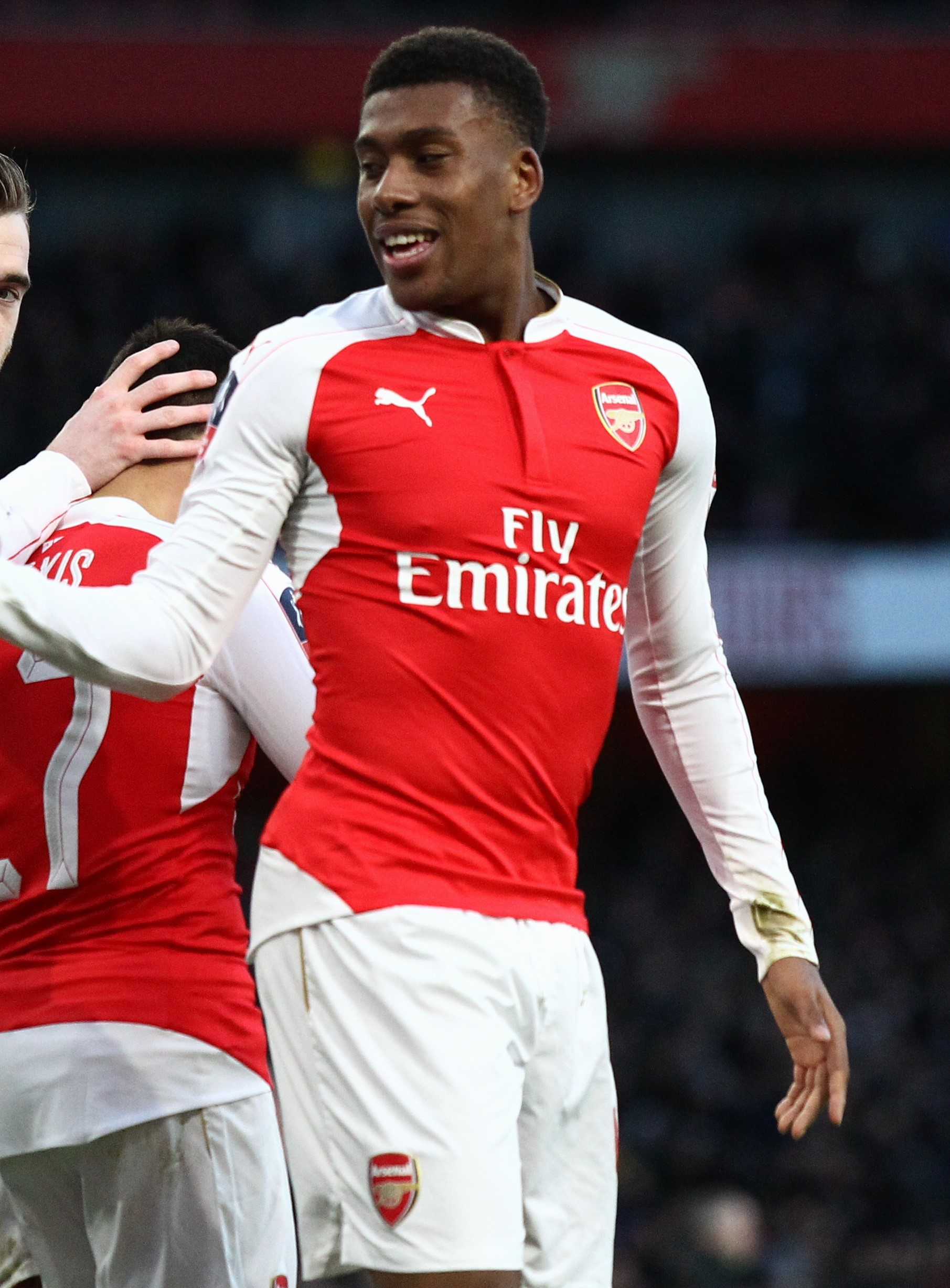
Iwobi with Arsenal, 2016

Iwobi joined Arsenal while still at primary school, in 2004, and was nearly released by the club at the age of 14 and again at the age of 16.

He was first involved in a first-team match as an unused substitute in a League Cup match against West Bromwich Albion on 25 September 2013. He signed a long-term contract with Arsenal in October 2015.

On 27 October 2015, Iwobi made his first-team debut for the club, starting in a 3–0 defeat to Sheffield Wednesday in the Round of 16 of the League Cup. He made his Premier League debut four days later in a 3–0 win against Swansea City at the Liberty Stadium, as a stoppage time substitute for Mesut Özil. Iwobi made his Champions League debut as an 85th-minute substitute in a 5–1 defeat against Bayern Munich. Iwobi started in the first team for the 2015–16 FA Cup 3rd and 4th round home wins against Sunderland and Burnley respectively.

After getting a first Champions League start in a 3–1 away defeat to Barcelona, Iwobi went on to score two goals in his first two Premier League starts in wins against Everton, and Watford, respectively.

In the following season, Iwobi changed his squad number from 45 to 17, after Alexis Sánchez took number 7 from the departing Tomáš Rosický. He went on to feature throughout Arsenal's victorious FA Cup campaign of 2016–17, winning 2–1 against Chelsea in the final. He achieved further success with Arsenal in the 2017 Community Shield, in which Arsenal beat Chelsea on penalties.

In January 2018, a video was released that allegedly showed Iwobi at a late-night party 36 hours before a match. In May 2018, after Arsenal manager Arsène Wenger announced he would be leaving the club, Iwobi described him as an "inspiration" and stated it was sad but exciting.

In August 2018, he signed a new long-term contract with the club, reportedly until 2023.

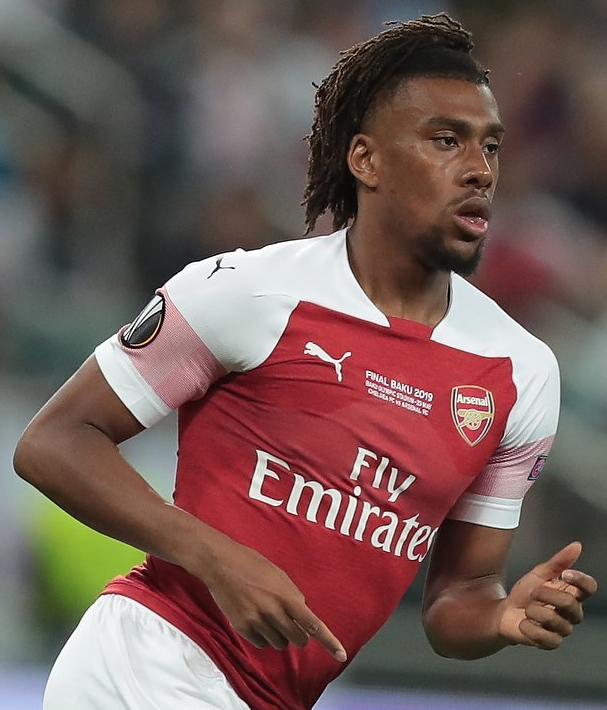
Iwobi at 2019 UEFA Europa League final

In January 2019, Iwobi was the subject of alleged racism from Indian actress Esha Gupta, an Arsenal ambassador. Gupta chose to share a screengrab of a WhatsApp conversation in which a friend mocked Iwobi as a "gorilla" and "Neanderthal" who "evolution had stopped for". Gupta later apologised.

In May 2019, Iwobi scored Arsenal's only goal in the 2019 UEFA Europa League Final, in a 4–1 defeat to Chelsea.

=== Everton ===
On 8 August 2019, Iwobi signed a five-year contract with Everton. According to the BBC, Arsenal received a fee of an initial £28 million, rising to £34 million with potential add-ons.

Fifteen days after signing, Iwobi made his debut as a substitute for the final half-hour in place of Gylfi Sigurðsson in a 2–0 loss at Aston Villa. On 28 August in the second round of the EFL Cup, he scored his first Everton goal in a 4–2 win at Lincoln City. He scored his first league goal on 1 September in a 3–2 win over Wolverhampton Wanderers, and was one of two players singled out for praise by manager Marco Silva afterwards.

Iwobi was named Everton's Players' Player of the Season for 2022–23 after providing a club-high eight assists.

=== Fulham ===
Iwobi signed for Fulham on 2 September 2023 for an undisclosed fee.

On 16 September, Iwobi made his debut for Fulham as a 62nd minute substitute in a 1–0 win over Luton Town. He scored his first goal for the club in a 2–1 win at Norwich City in the third round of the EFL Cup on 27 September.

On 27 November, Iwobi scored his first Premier League goal for Fulham in a 3–2 win over Wolverhampton Wanderers at Craven Cottage. On 6 December, he scored the first league brace of his career in a 5–0 win at home to Nottingham Forest.

On 6 April 2024, in a game against Newcastle United, Iwobi became the Nigerian footballer with most minutes played in the history of the Premier League, surpassing the previous record held by Mikel John Obi.

In January 2025, he spoke positively about the "brotherhood" of Fulham's squad.

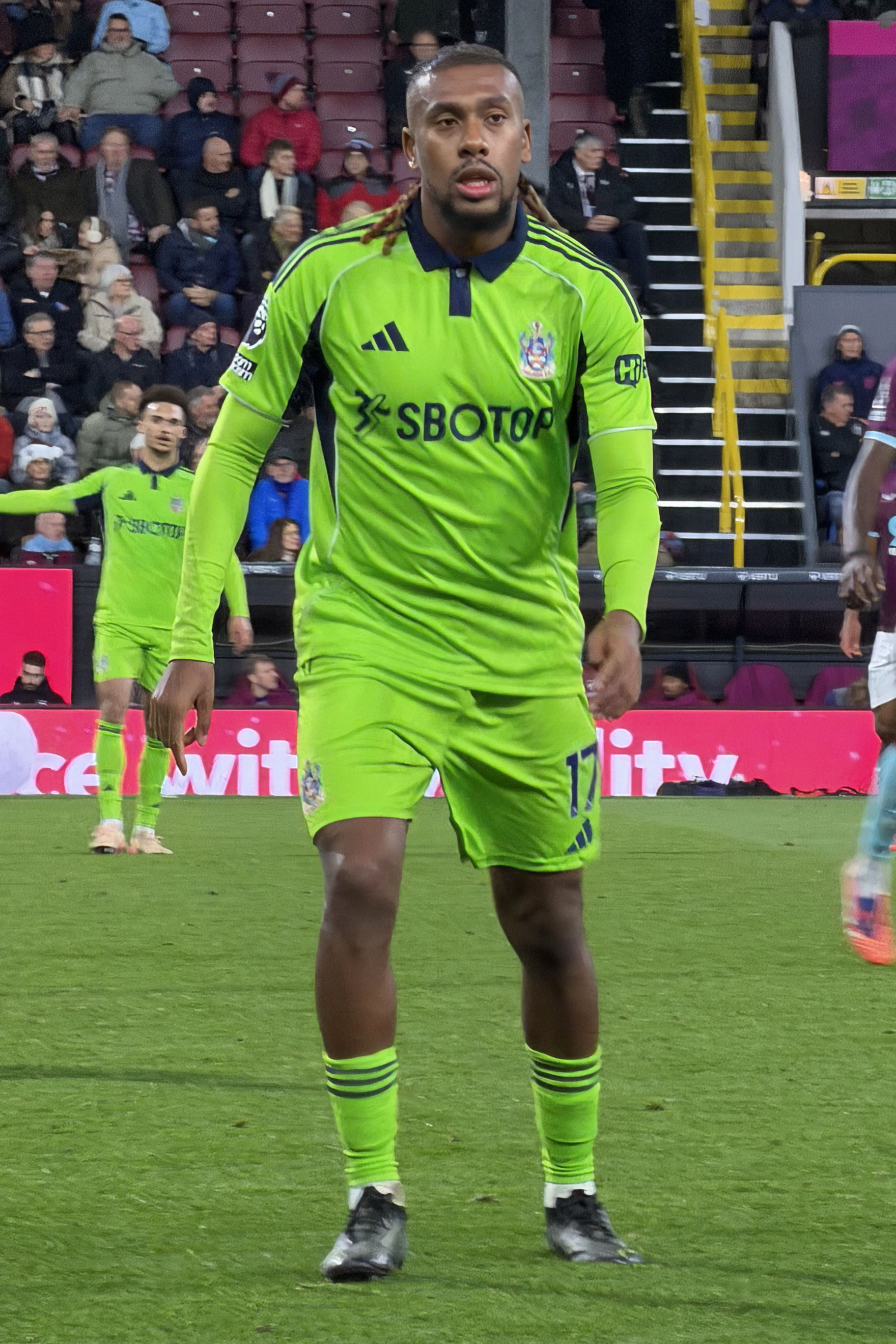
Iwobi with Fulham in 2025.

On 5 September 2026, Iwobi reached league 100 appearances for Fulham.

== International career ==
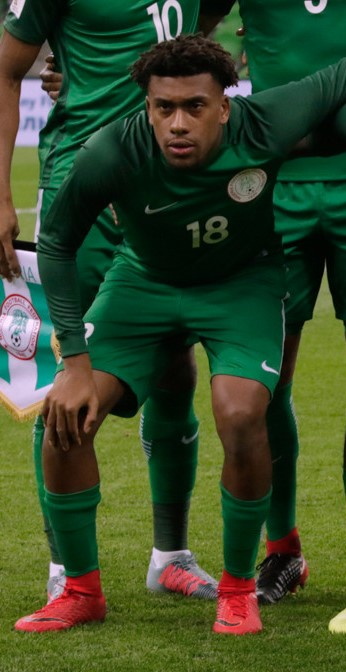
Iwobi with Nigeria in 2017

Eligible to represent England or his birth country Nigeria, Iwobi started as a youth international for England, with whom he won the 2011 Victory Shield. Iwobi earned 11 caps for England at underage level, but went on to declare for Nigeria in 2015. He made his senior debut for the Super Eagles on 8 October 2015 replacing Ahmed Musa in the 57th minute of a 2–0 friendly defeat to DR Congo in Visé, Belgium, before he had made a competitive appearance for his club.

He was selected by Nigeria for their 35-man provisional squad for the 2016 Summer Olympics. He was not a part of the 18-man final squad.

In August 2017 Iwobi pulled out of Nigeria's squad for that month's World Cup qualifiers due to injury. In October 2017, Iwobi scored for Nigeria in a 1–0 win over Zambia to secure the Super Eagles a spot in the 2018 FIFA World Cup in Russia. He was named in Nigeria's 23-man squad for the competition and featured in all three games as the Super Eagles were knocked out in the group stage.

He was included in Nigeria's squad for the 2019 AFCON tournament. At the tournament in Egypt, Iwobi played in six of Nigeria's seven matches and scored one goal—a decisive 77th-minute winner in the round of 16 against defending champions Cameroon (3–2)—as the Super Eagles claimed bronze, their best finish since 2013. After the tournament he said he was looking forward to returning to club football with Arsenal.

Iwobi was named in the Nigeria squad for the delayed 2021 Africa Cup of Nations in 2022. He was given a red card five minutes after coming on as a substitute in the knockout stage match against Tunisia, a match Nigeria lost 0–1. At the 2023 African Cup of Nations, Iwobi was also in the Nigerian squad and played all seven games as Nigeria emerged runner-up, losing the final game to hosts, Ivory Coast.

Iwobi was included in the Nigerian team for the 2025 Africa Cup of Nations taking place in Morocco, earning a bronze medal. On 10 June 2026, he made his 100th international appearance for Nigeria in a 2–1 friendly defeat against Portugal. (Note: Iwobi played in a match against Togo in 2017, but it is not recognised as an official international by FIFA because Nigeria made nine substitutions.)

== Personal life ==
In December 2024, Iwobi opened a temporary shop in east London which gave out free food for local residents for Christmas.

== Musical career ==
In 2024, Iwobi began his a music career under the stage name "17," a reference to his shirt number at Fulham. His debut single, titled "Don't Shoot," was released in June 2024 and featured contributions from former Arsenal teammate Chuba Akpom, performing as Skoli, and Medy Elito, also known as Don-EE. The track received attention for its reflective lyrics and accumulated close to 60,000 streams on Spotify.

In October 2024, Iwobi followed up with his second single, "What's Luv?," featuring artists SPKS and MBrown. The song contains themes exploring modern relationships.

On 9 April 2026, Iwobi released his debut EP, More To Life. The nine-track project includes guest appearances from Fido, 24AM, Giddi, and SPKS.

=== Singles ===
==== As lead artist ====
Song	Year	Album
"Don't Shoot" (featuring Skoli and Don-EE)	2024	Non-album singles
"What's Luv?" (featuring SPKS and MBrown)	2024	Non-album singles
"17 – Letter (Freestyle)"	2025	Non-album singles

=== EPs ===
Title	EP details
More To Life	Released: 2026; Format: Digital download, streaming; Label: Self-released

== Career statistics ==
=== Club ===
As of match played 21 November 2026

Appearances and goals by club, season and competition
Club	Season	League			FA Cup		League Cup		Europe		Other		Total	
Club	Season	Division	Apps	Goals	Apps	Goals	Apps	Goals	Apps	Goals	Apps	Goals	Apps	Goals
Arsenal	2015–16	Premier League	13	2	5	0	1	0	2 (Note: Appearances in UEFA Champions League)	0	0	0	21	2
Arsenal	2016–17	Premier League	26	3	3	0	2	0	7	1	—		38	4
Arsenal	2017–18	Premier League	26	3	1	0	5	0	6 (Note: Appearances in UEFA Europa League)	0	1 (Note: Appearance in FA Community Shield)	0	39	3
Arsenal	2018–19	Premier League	35	3	2	1	3	0	11	2	—		51	6
Arsenal	Total		100	11	11	1	11	0	26	3	1	0	149	15
Everton	2019–20	Premier League	25	1	0	0	4	1	—		—		29	2
Everton	2020–21	Premier League	30	1	3	0	3	1	—		—		36	2
Everton	2021–22	Premier League	28	2	2	0	2	1	—		—		32	3
Everton	2022–23	Premier League	38	2	1	0	2	0	—		—		41	2
Everton	2023–24	Premier League	2	0	—		0	0	—		—		2	0
Everton	Total		123	6	6	0	11	3	0	0	0	0	140	9
Fulham	2023–24	Premier League	30	5	0	0	3	1	—		—		33	6
Fulham	2024–25	Premier League	38	9	4	0	2	0	—		—		44	9
Fulham	2025–26	Premier League	29	4	2	0	2	0	—		—		33	4
Fulham	2026–27	Premier League	11	1	0	0	1	0	—		—		12	1
Fulham	Total		108	19	6	0	8	1	0	0	0	0	122	20
Career total			331	36	23	1	30	4	26	3	1	0	411	44

=== International ===
As of match played 17 November 2026

Appearances and goals by national team and year
National team	Year	Apps	Goals
Nigeria	2015	2	0
Nigeria	2016	6	1
Nigeria	2017	5 (Note: Iwobi also appeared in one match against Togo in 2017, however Nigeria made nine substitutions during this match, and therefore it is not recognised as an official match by FIFA.)	3
Nigeria	2018	12	1
Nigeria	2019	15	2
Nigeria	2020	4	2
Nigeria	2021	6	0
Nigeria	2022	10	1
Nigeria	2023	7	0
Nigeria	2024	15	0
Nigeria	2025	10	0
Nigeria	2026	11	0
Total		103	10

As of match played 9 June 2022. Scores and results list Nigeria's goal tally first.

List of international goals scored by Alex Iwobi
No.	Date	Venue	Opponent	Score	Result	Competition
1	9 October 2016	Levy Mwanawasa Stadium, Ndola, Zambia	Zambia	1–0	2–1	2018 FIFA World Cup qualification
2	7 October 2017	Godswill Akpabio International Stadium, Uyo, Nigeria	Zambia	1–0	1–0	2018 FIFA World Cup qualification
3	14 November 2017	Krasnodar Stadium, Krasnodar, Russia	Argentina	2–2	4–2	Friendly
4	14 November 2017	Krasnodar Stadium, Krasnodar, Russia	Argentina	4–2	4–2	Friendly
5	2 June 2018	Wembley Stadium, London, England	England	1–2	1–2	Friendly
6	6 July 2019	Alexandria Stadium, Alexandria, Egypt	Cameroon	3–2	3–2	2019 Africa Cup of Nations
7	17 November 2019	Setsoto Stadium, Maseru, Lesotho	Lesotho	1–1	4–2	2021 Africa Cup of Nations qualification
8	13 November 2020	Ogbe Stadium, Benin City, Nigeria	Sierra Leone	1–0	4–4	2021 Africa Cup of Nations qualification
9	13 November 2020	Ogbe Stadium, Benin City, Nigeria	Sierra Leone	3–0	4–4	2021 Africa Cup of Nations qualification
10	9 June 2022	Abiola National Stadium, Abuja, Nigeria	Sierra Leone	1–1	2–1	2023 Africa Cup of Nations qualification

== Honours ==
Arsenal

- FA Cup: 2016–17
- FA Community Shield: 2015, 2017
- EFL Cup runner-up: 2017–18
- UEFA Europa League runner-up: 2018–19

England U16

- Victory Shield: 2011

Nigeria

- Africa Cup of Nations runner-up: 2023; third place: 2019, 2025

Individual

- CAF Youth Player of the Year: 2016
- CAF Team of the Year: 2016 (as a substitute)
- Everton Players' Player of the Year: 2023

Orders

- Member of the Order of the Niger

== See also ==
- List of men's footballers with 100 or more international caps
