= Tom Cairney =

Scottish footballer (born 1991)

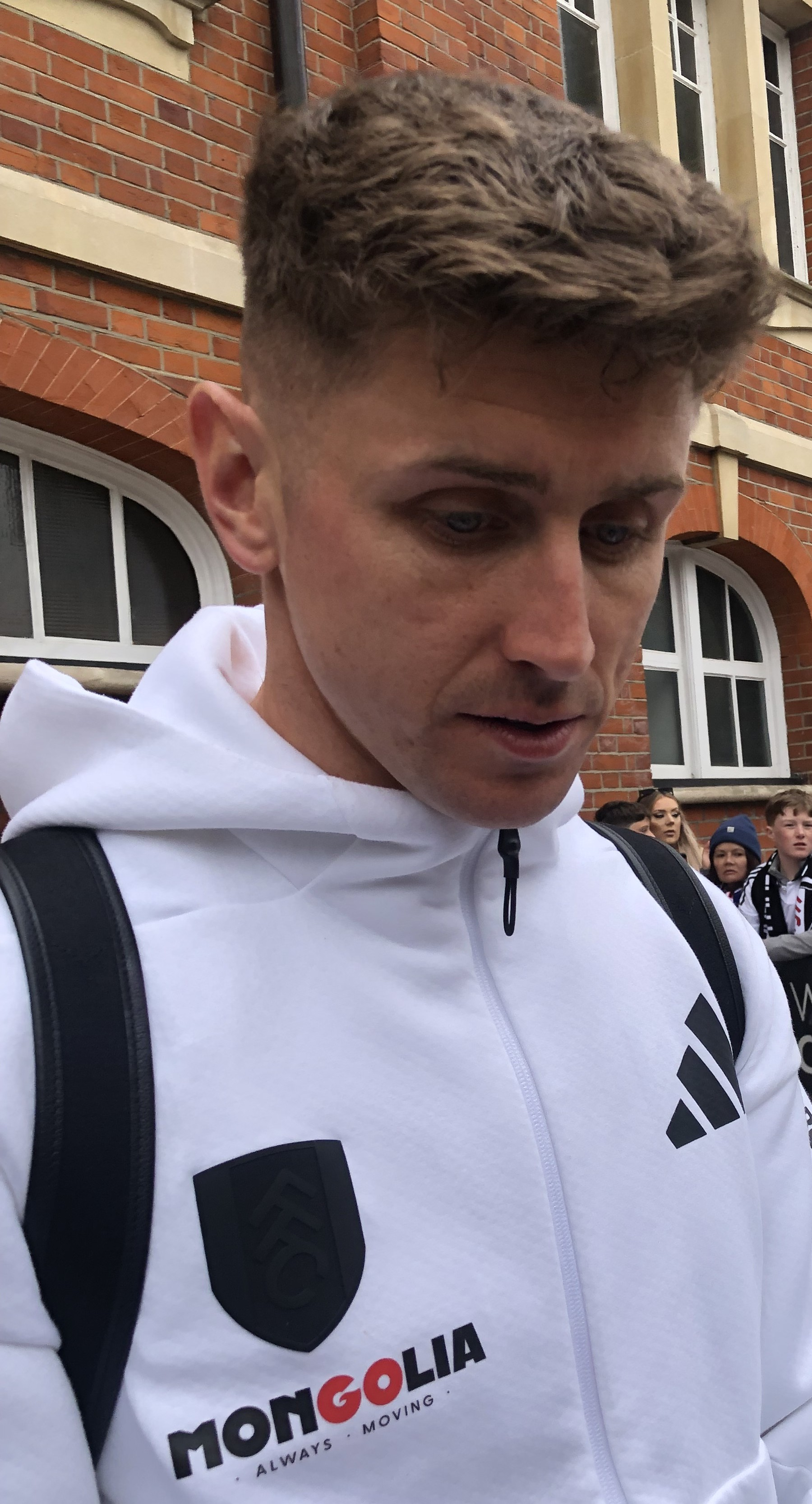
- Cairney with Fulham in 2025

Personal information
- Full name: Thomas Cairney
- Date of birth: 20 January 1991 (age 35)
- Place of birth: Nottingham, England
- Height: 6 ft 1 in (1.86 m)
- Position: Midfielder

Team information
- Current team: Fulham
- Number: 10

Youth career
- 1998–2007: Leeds United
- 2007–2009: Hull City

Senior career*
Years	Team	Apps	(Gls)
2009–2014	Hull City	70	(2)
2013–2014	→ Blackburn Rovers (loan)	23	(1)
2014–2015	Blackburn Rovers	53	(7)
2015–	Fulham	344	(45)

International career
2009	Scotland U19	2	(0)
2010–2012	Scotland U21	6	(1)
2017–2018	Scotland	2	(0)
- * Club domestic league appearances and goals as of 21:39, 21 November 2026 (UTC)

Thomas Cairney (born 20 January 1991) is a professional footballer who plays as a midfielder and captains Premier League club Fulham. Born in England, he represented the Scotland national team.

== Early life ==
Thomas Cairney was born in Nottingham Nottinghamshire, but moved to and was raised in the town of Selby in North Yorkshire after his family relocated there during his time in the Leeds United Academy. He was raised by a Scottish father, who worked as a miner and then as a taxi driver and postman. He also revealed that his father would take him to Scotland and watch Celtic as a youngster. When he was about 15 or 16, he worked for Barclays Bank for work experience for two weeks. He described this as the "worst two weeks of [his] life!".

== Club career ==
=== Early career ===
Cairney started his football career at Nottingham Forest. At the age of 7, he was signed by Leeds United. Cairney was released from the Leeds United youth system at the age of 16 after being told he was too small. Reflecting on his time at Leeds United, he said: "To be honest it crushed me, it crushed me a lot, I was with Leeds from when I was seven to 16 so it was a big part of my life. I owe a lot to (then Hull manager) Phil Brown as he believed in me."

=== Hull City ===
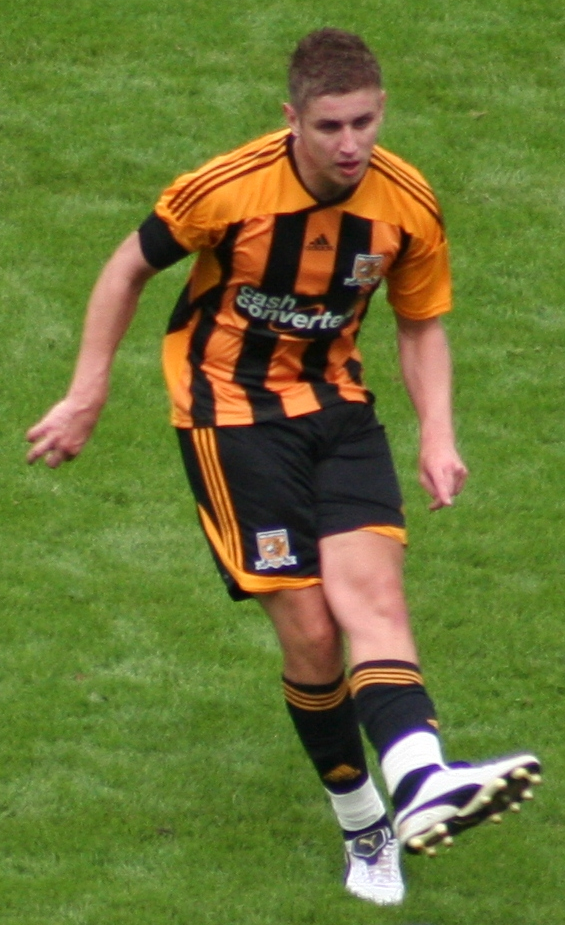
Cairney playing for Hull City in 2011

Hull City gave Cairney a chance when they signed him to a youth contract in 2007. Cairney was named as Hull's Young Player of the Year for the 2008–09 season. For this, he signed a two-year contract with the club in June 2009.

He played for Hull against Tottenham Hotspur in the final of the pre-season Premier League Asia Trophy in Beijing on 31 July 2009. His first-team debut came against Southend United in the League Cup on 25 August 2009, when he opened the scoring with a curling long-range effort as Hull won 3–1. He went on to make his Premier League debut on 30 January 2010 in a 2–2 draw against Wolverhampton Wanderers. On 7 March 2010, Cairney scored his first league goal for Hull in a 5–1 defeat against Everton, an impressive volley from outside the area. Cairney signed a new three-year contract with the club on 31 March 2010. Having been given a first team opportunity later in the season, he made the total of 14 appearances and scoring once for the side.

Following Hull's relegation, Cairney began to establish himself in the first team in the 2010–11 season. He scored one goal, a curling free kick against Norwich City that helped Hull to their first away victory in 30 games. In January 2011, he signed a contract extension with the club, keeping him until 2013. Despite suffering an injury, Cairney made the total of 23 appearances during the 2010–11 season.

In the 2011–12 season, Cairney continued to feature in the first team and then set up a double assists, in a 3–2 win over Watford on 22 October 2011. He then scored his first goal of the season on 7 January 2012, in a 3–1 win over Ipswich Town in the third round of the FA Cup. Despite suffering a foot injury, Cairney made a total of 29 appearances for Hull in the 2011–12 season.

At the start of the 2012–13 season, Cairney played the vital role, in a 3–2 loss against Doncaster Rovers in the second round of the League Cup on 28 August 2012, when he set up two Hull City's goals in the match. However, during the match, he sustained a serious knee injury, following a reckless tackle by Doncaster's James Husband in a League Cup tie. Steve Bruce later described the challenge as a "horror tackle". After over three months out injured, Cairney returned to fitness on 8 December 2012, appearing on the bench for Hull's away victory over Watford. Cairney made his return the following week at home to Huddersfield coming on as a 63rd-minute substitute for teammate Corry Evans.

In the third round of the FA Cup against Leyton Orient on 5 January 2013, Cairney set up a goal for Nick Proschwitz, in a 1–1 draw to lead to a third round replay. In the third round replay, he scored a winning goal, in a 2–1 win to send them through to the next round. Although he appeared less and remained on the substitute bench for the rest of the season, Cairney went on to make a total of 14 appearances and scoring once for the side, as Hull City were promoted to the Premier League.

=== Blackburn Rovers ===
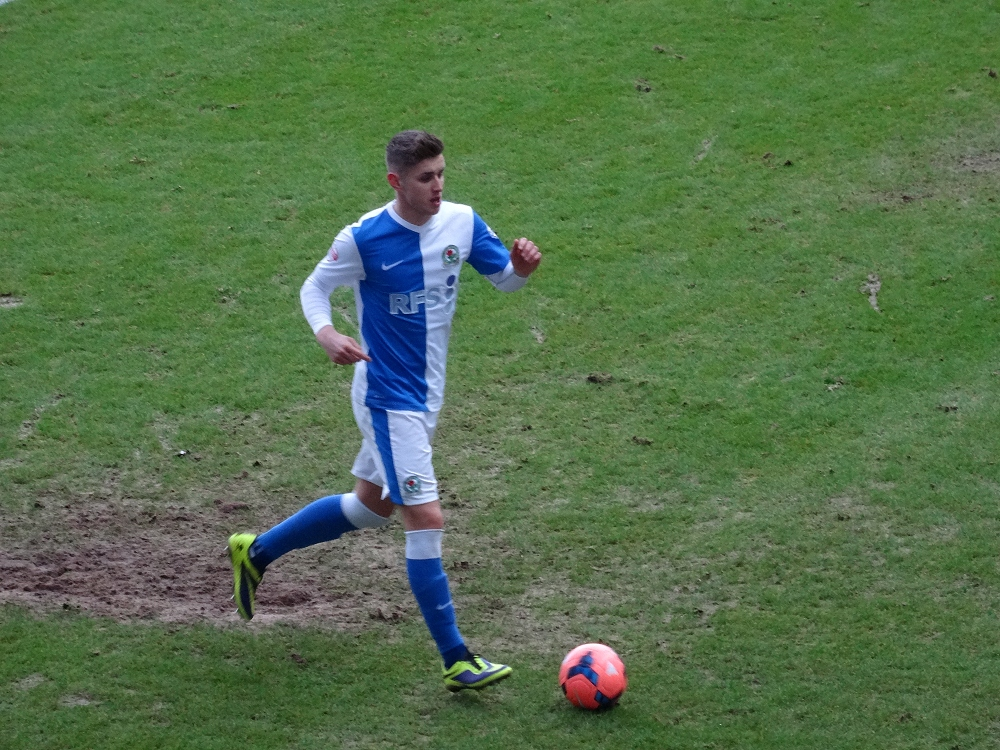
Cairney playing for Blackburn Rovers in 2014

On 1 August 2013, Cairney joined Blackburn Rovers on loan until January.

He made his debut in a 1–1 draw against Derby County, as a 77th-minute substitute for Alex Marrow. Two days later, Cairney made his full debut for the club in an eventful League Cup clash with Carlisle United, scoring one and providing one assist, before being sent off for the first time in his career after two bookable offences. Cairney equalised for Blackburn in a 5–2 victory over Barnsley on 24 August, opening his Championship account for the club. Since joining Blackburn Rovers, Cairney established himself in the first team there, having quickly made an impact. He then set up two goals on 1 January 2014, in a 2–1 win over Leeds United.

On 2 January 2014, his move to Blackburn was made permanent after a successful first half of the season on loan. Cairney said: "I'm very pleased to sign permanently – that was a goal of mine when I came on loan in August." After completing this permanent deal, Cairney scored his second league goal for Blackburn Rovers, both of them coming against Barnsley on 28 January 2014. The local newspaper Lancashire Telegraph named him as the top performer for January. However, after being sidelined with ankle injury, which he sustained against Reading, he scored on his return from ankle injury against Brighton & Hove Albion on 1 April 2014, as well as, assisting a goal, in a 3–3 draw. Despite suffering from another injury, Cairney returned to the first team, scoring two more goals against Charlton Athletic and Wigan Athletic. Cairney rounded off his successful season when fans voted him Player of the Year 2013–14. At the end of the 2013–14 season, Cairney scored 6 times in total of 40 appearances.

In the 2014–15 season, Cairney started the season well when he scored two goals by the end of the first month of the season against Cardiff City and Norwich City (for this, he won the club's Goal of the Season). He continued to play in the central–midfield role for the side and for that, he was nominated for August's Player of the Month, but lost out to Charlton's Igor Vetokele. However, in a 2–1 win over Leeds United on 22 November 2014, Cairney was sent–off for a second bookable. Shortly after serving his suspension, he then suffered ankle injury. It was not until on 26 December 2014 when he returned from the first team, where he played 69 minutes, in a 2–1 loss against Bolton Wanderers. Following his return to the first team, Cairney regained his place for the rest of the season, but struggled to score goals, as he acknowledged his second season at the club had become difficult. On 4 April 2015 he scored his third goal of the season, in a 3–3 draw against Leeds United. Despite being sidelined on 3 occasions in the 2014–15 season, Cairney scored 3 times in the total of 45 appearances this season. During his time at Blackburn Rovers, he was a fan favourite among the club's supporters.

=== Fulham ===
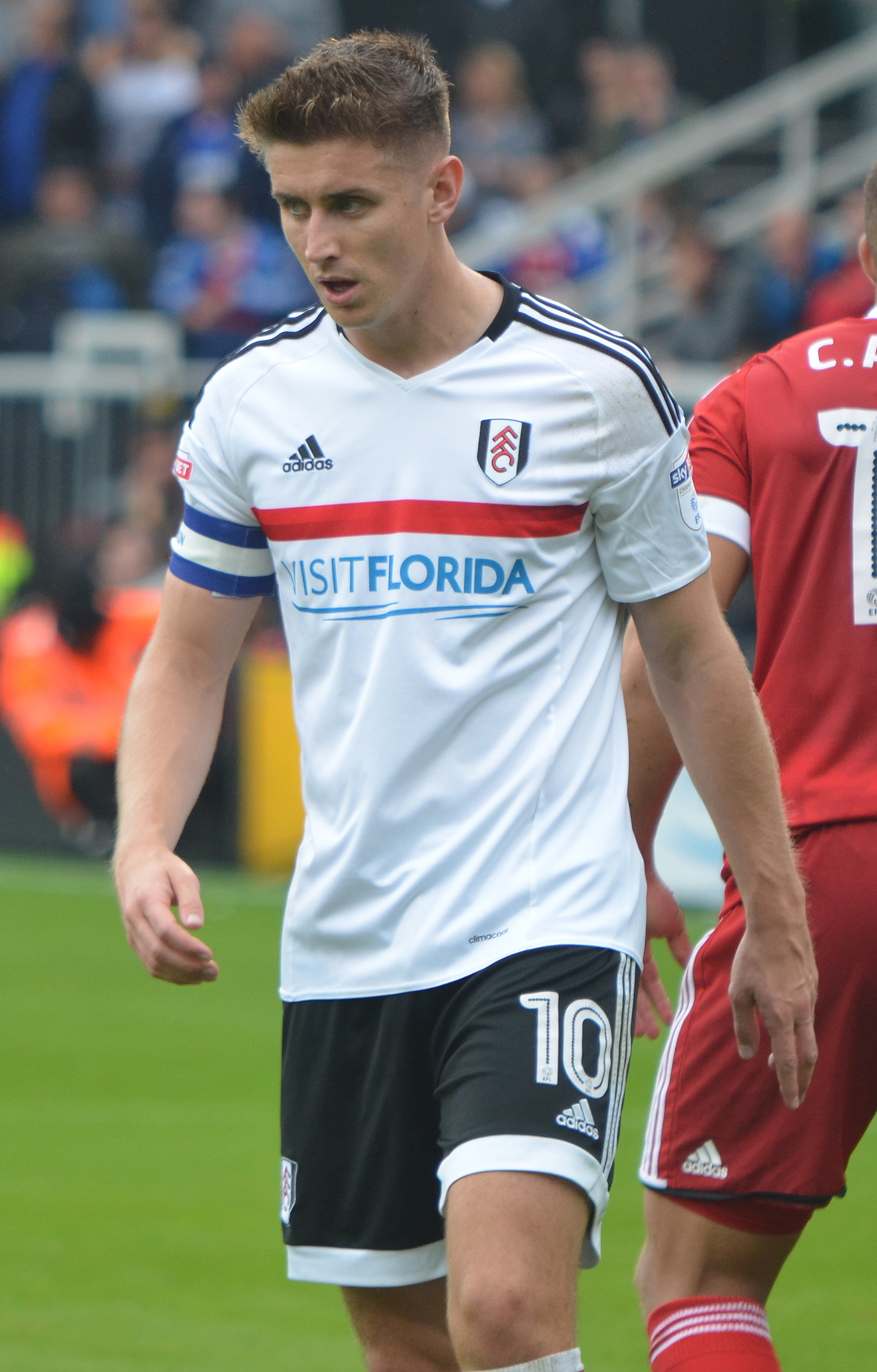
Cairney playing with Fulham in 2016

Cairney signed for Fulham on 26 June 2015 for an undisclosed fee, signing a four-year contract. The move for Cairney reportedly cost £3 million. Cairney was given the number 10 shirt for the new season, succeeding Bryan Ruiz, who departed the club in the summer transfer window.

Cairney made his Fulham debut, where he started and played the whole game, in a 1–1 draw against Cardiff City. In a follow-up match on 15 August 2015, he scored his first goal for the club in a 2–1 defeat at home to Brighton & Hove Albion on 15 August 2015 and then scored again in a 2–1 loss against Hull City four days later on 19 August 2015. Despite the defeat, he was named the club's Man of the Match. His goal against Brighton & Hove Albion earned him August's Goal of the Month. He then scored again on 19 September 2015, in a 3–2 loss against Sheffield Wednesday. However, in a 3–0 loss against Wolverhampton Wanderers on 29 September 2015, Cairney was sent–off for "a two-footed tackle" on Adam Le Fondre in the 35th minute. After serving a three match suspension, he regained his first team place since returning and played most of the season in the right-hand side of midfield. Cairney then ended his four months goal drought when he scored and set up a goal, in a 3–1 win over rivals, Queens Park Rangers on 13 February 2016. Following the match, he was named Man of the Match. After scoring three more goals, including a brace with a 3–0 win over Charlton Athletic on 20 February 2016, his performance throughout February earned him a Championship Player of the Month.

In the last game of the season, Cairney scored the only goal in the game, with a 1–0 win over Bolton Wanderers. Despite being sidelined on two occasions later in the season, Cairney scored 8 times in the total of 42 appearances in all competitions. In his first season at the club, he finished second place for the club's Player of the Season, behind Ross McCormack.

At the start of the 2016–17 season, Cairney was given an armband to replace Scott Parker against Newcastle United in the opening game of the season, who did not start, and set up a goal for Matt Smith in a 1–0 win. He then scored two goals in the first month of the league season against Leeds United and Blackburn Rovers. Both of these matches resulted him earning Man of the Match. In addition, he was nominated for both August's Sky Bet Championship Player of the Month and August's Sky Bet Championship Goal of the Month. Despite suffering from an injury that saw him miss one match in mid–October, For most of the season, Cairney captained the side. After scoring three more goals by the end of the year, his performance at Fulham attracted attention from Premier League side Middlesbrough, Aston Villa and Newcastle. However, the club made it clear that Cairney was not for sale. Having kept him throughout the January transfer window, he scored two goals throughout February against Nottingham Forest and Bristol City, resulting him being nominated for February's Player of the Month.

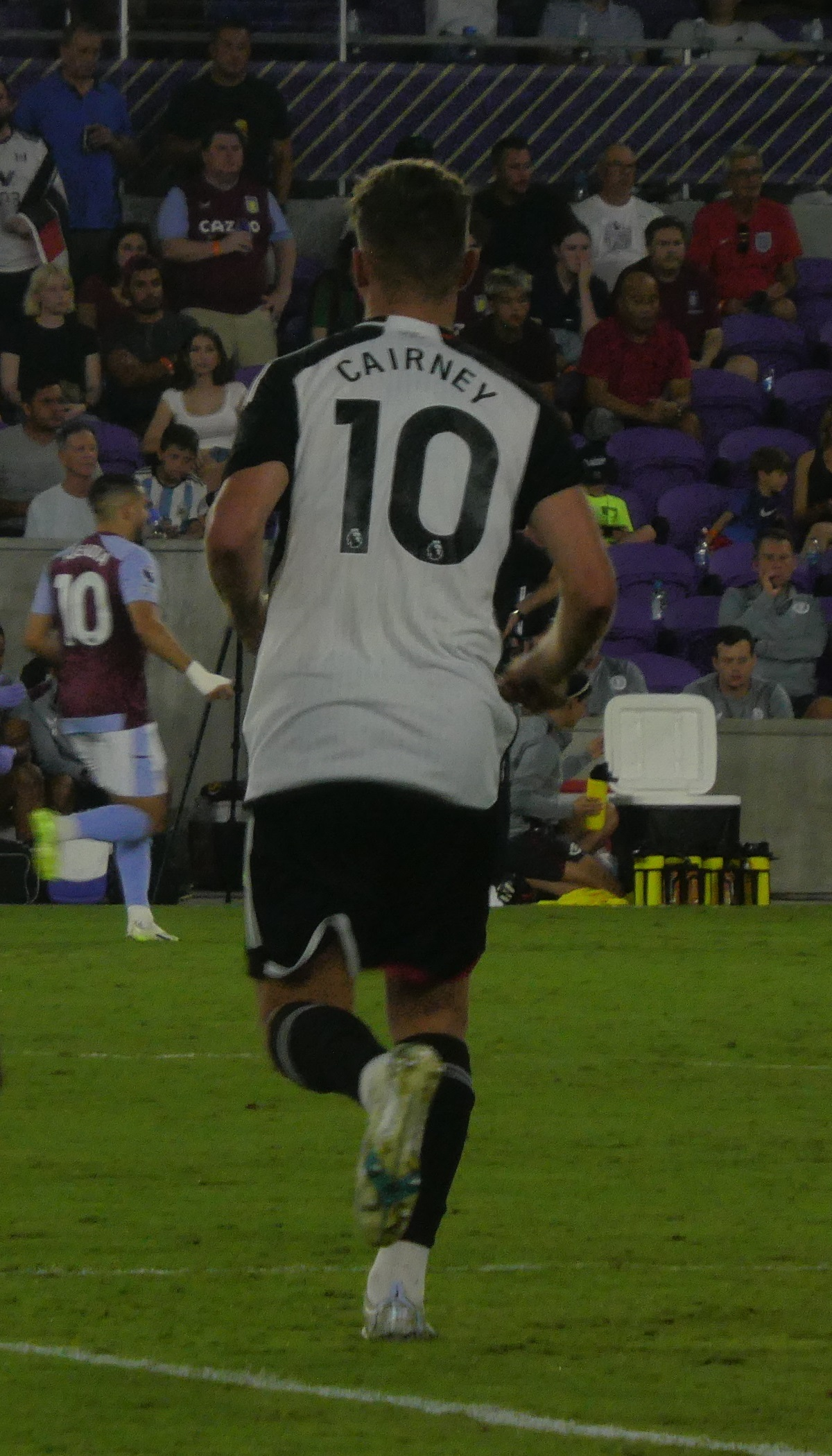
Cairney playing for Fulham in 2023

Cairney scored the opening goal with a "thunderbolt from distance", in a 3–1 win over Newcastle United on 11 March 2017. By May, Cairney added three goals, including scoring two goals in two matches against Huddersfield Town and Brentford. He also scored in the first leg of the promotion play–offs, in a 1–1 draw against Reading, but Fulham lost 1–0 in the next leg, dashing their hopes of playing in the Premier League next season During the 2016–17 season, Cairney scored 13 times in 51 appearances in all competitions, becoming joint top–scorer, alongside Stefan Johansen. Having played a key role for the side this season, Cairney was named the club's Player of the Season, the EFL Player of the Year at the 2017 London Football Awards and was included in the EFL Championship PFA Team of the Year, alongside Ryan Sessegnon.

Ahead of the 2017–18 season, Cairney signed a one-year contract extension with the club, keeping him until 2021. He was named the new captain for the new season, succeeding Scott Parker. After playing in the season opener, a 1–1 draw against Norwich City, Cairney suffered an injury ahead of the friendly match against Reading. It wasn't the first time he suffered an injury, which occurred during the pre–season friendly. After missing two matches, Cairney returned to the first team, in a 1–0 loss against Sheffield Wednesday on 19 August 2017. In January 2018, Fulham rejected offers of £15 million and £18 million from West Ham United for Cairney.

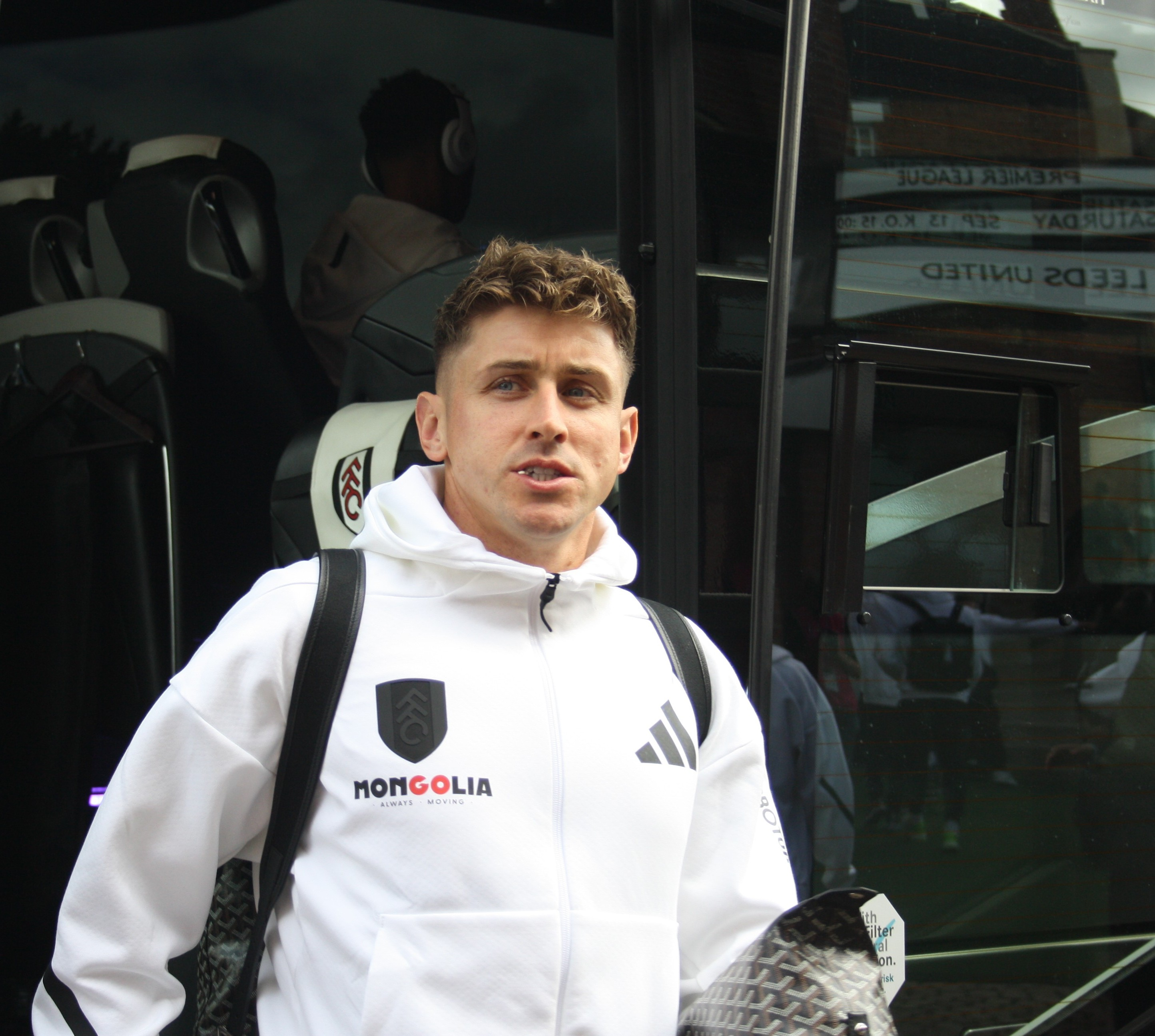
Cairney with Fulham prior to the match against Leeds United in 2025

In April 2018, he was nominated for the EFL Championship Player of the Season award. On 26 May, he scored the only goal against Aston Villa at Wembley Stadium, in the 2018 Championship play-off final to promote Fulham to the Premier League.

In May 2019, Cairney signed a new long-term contract with Fulham. During his four-year spell at the club, he has scored 28 goals during 160 appearances.

In the 2020 pre-season Cairney injured his knee. He managed the injury to allow him to play 10 games up to 19 December. He was then out injured for a number of months with his season reported in March as threatened by premature end.

Since returning from injury, Cairney was used primarily as a substitute, although he retained his position as club captain. On 27 August 2022, Cairney came off the bench against Arsenal to record his 250th appearance for Fulham.

Cairney scored his first goal of the 2023–24 season in a 5–0 home win over Nottingham Forest on 6 December 2023. Four days later, Cairney made his 300th appearance in all competitions for Fulham in a 5–0 thumping of West Ham United, in which he assisted one goal and was named man of the match.

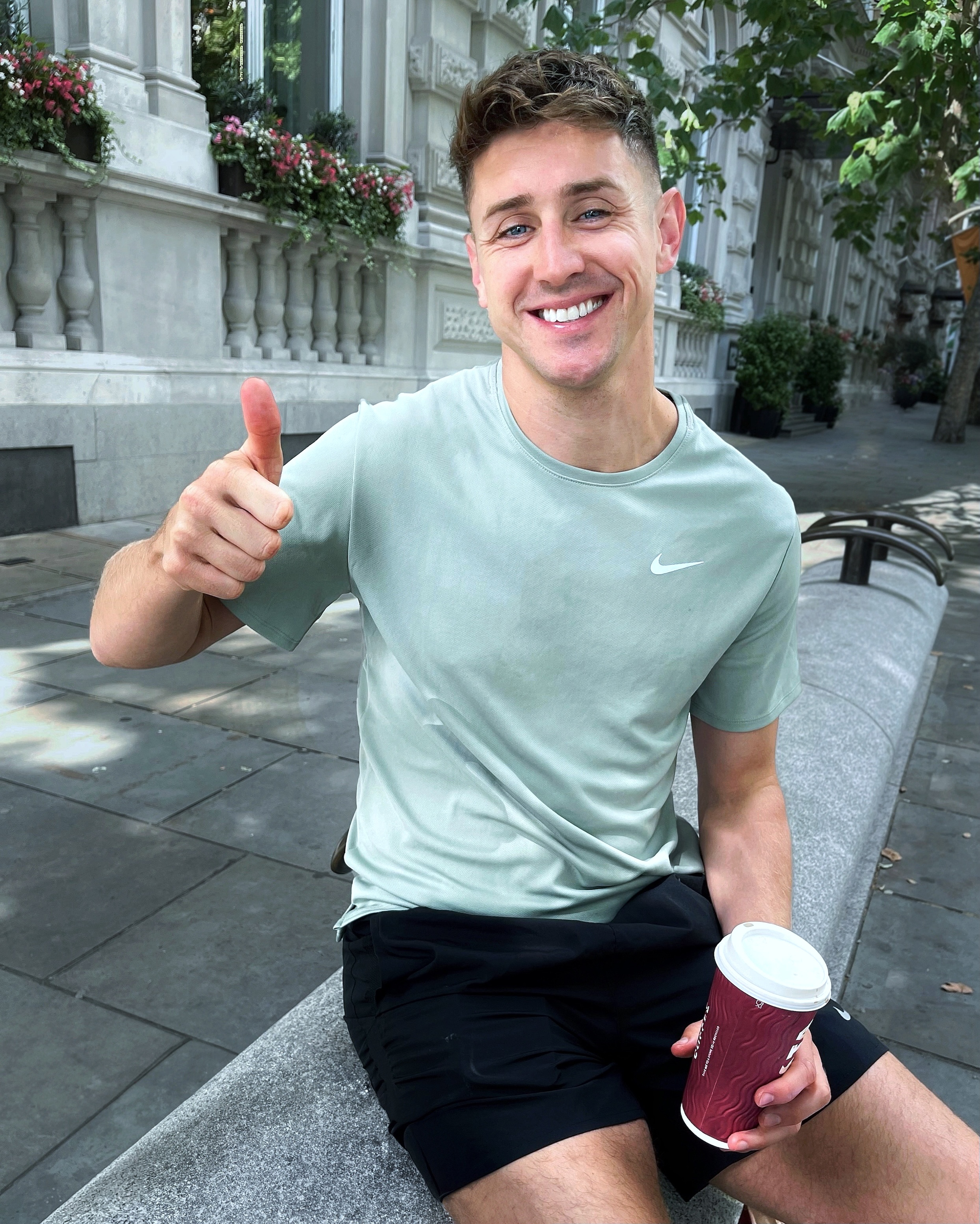
Cairney in 2025

On 2 January 2024, Cairney extended his contract with Fulham until the summer of 2025.

He scored his first goal of the 2024–25 season on 1 December 2024, the equaliser in a 1–1 draw against Tottenham Hotspur in which he also received a straight red card.

In January 2026, it was announced that Cairney had extended his contract with Fulham until the summer of 2027.

== International career ==
=== Youth career ===
Cairney is eligible to play for Scotland through his Scottish father. He continued to be eligible to play for England, and his Hull City captain George Boateng described Cairney as being potentially a "huge asset to the national team of England". However, he said that his loyalty belongs to Scotland, even if England approached him.

Cairney was called up by Scotland national under-19 team for the first time in September 2009. He made his Scotland U19 debut, where he started and played for 50 minutes before being substituted, in a 3–1 loss against Iceland U19 on 9 September 2009. For the Scotland U19 side, Cairney went on to play two times.

Then, on 11 August 2010, Cairney was called up by Scotland under-21 side for the first time He made his debut for the against Sweden on 11 August 2010. Cairney then scored his first Scotland U21 goal on 10 August 2011, in a 3–1 win over Norway. He made a total of six appearances for the Scotland under-21s between August 2010 and February 2012.

=== Senior team ===
Cairney earned his first call up from Scotland national team in March 2017. Following his first call up from the senior side, Cairney said he wanted to establish himself in the Scotland national team. He made his full international debut in a 1–1 draw with Canada in a friendly. His second cap was in 2018 in another friendly, this time against Costa Rica.

== Career statistics ==
=== Club ===
As of match played 21 November 2026

Appearances and goals by club, season and competition
Club	Season	League			FA Cup		League Cup		Other		Total	
Club	Season	Division	Apps	Goals	Apps	Goals	Apps	Goals	Apps	Goals	Apps	Goals
Hull City	2009–10	Premier League	11	1	1	0	2	1	—		14	2
Hull City	2010–11	Championship	22	1	0	0	1	0	—		23	1
Hull City	2011–12	Championship	27	0	2	1	0	0	—		29	1
Hull City	2012–13	Championship	10	0	2	1	2	0	—		14	1
Hull City	Total		70	2	5	2	5	1	—		80	5
Blackburn Rovers	2013–14	Championship	37	5	2	0	1	1	—		40	6
Blackburn Rovers	2014–15	Championship	39	3	5	0	1	0	—		45	3
Blackburn Rovers	Total		76	8	7	0	2	1	—		85	9
Fulham	2015–16	Championship	39	8	1	0	2	0	—		42	8
Fulham	2016–17	Championship	45	12	3	0	1	0	2 (Note: Appearances in Championship play-offs)	1	51	13
Fulham	2017–18	Championship	34	5	0	0	0	0	3	1	37	6
Fulham	2018–19	Premier League	31	1	1	0	1	0	—		33	1
Fulham	2019–20	Championship	39	8	1	0	0	0	3	0	43	8
Fulham	2020–21	Premier League	10	1	0	0	1	0	—		11	1
Fulham	2021–22	Championship	26	3	2	0	0	0	—		28	3
Fulham	2022–23	Premier League	33	2	4	1	1	0	—		38	3
Fulham	2023–24	Premier League	34	1	2	0	6	1	—		42	2
Fulham	2024–25	Premier League	25	2	2	0	2	0	—		29	2
Fulham	2025–26	Premier League	24	2	2	0	3	0	—		29	2
Fulham	2026–27	Premier League	4	0	0	0	1	0	—		5	0
Fulham	Total		344	45	18	1	18	1	8	2	388	49
Career total			489	55	30	3	25	3	8	2	552	63

=== International ===
As of match played 23 March 2018

Appearances and goals by national team and year
National team	Year	Apps	Goals
Scotland	2017	1	0
Scotland	2018	1	0
Total		2	0

== Honours ==
Fulham

- EFL Championship: 2021–22; play-offs: 2018, 2020

Individual

- Hull City Young Player of the Year: 2008–09
- Blackburn Rovers Player of the Year: 2013–14
- Fulham Player of the Season: 2016–17
- PFA Team of the Year: 2016–17 Championship, 2017–18 Championship
