= Ryan Sessegnon =

English footballer (born 2000)

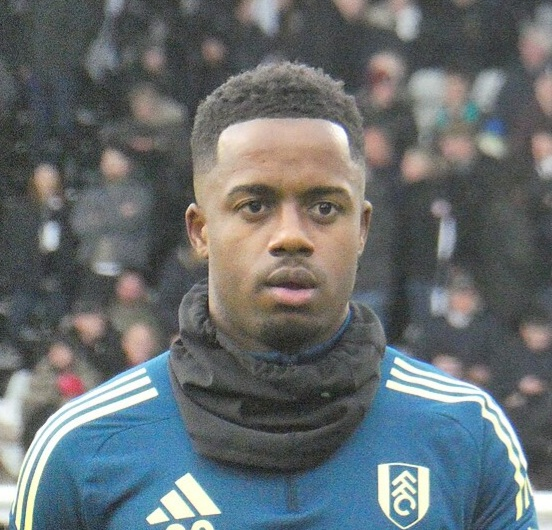
- Sessegnon with Fulham in 2026

Personal information
- Full name: Kouassi Ryan Sessegnon
- Date of birth: 18 May 2000 (age 26)
- Place of birth: Roehampton, England
- Height: 5 ft 10 in (1.78 m)
- Positions: Left-back; left midfielder; left winger

Team information
- Current team: Fulham
- Number: 30

Youth career
- 2008–2016: Fulham

Senior career*
Years	Team	Apps	(Gls)
2016–2019	Fulham	106	(22)
2019–2024	Tottenham Hotspur	38	(2)
2020–2021	→ TSG Hoffenheim (loan)	23	(2)
2024–	Fulham	48	(8)

International career
2015–2016	England U16	10	(3)
2016	England U17	6	(0)
2016–2017	England U19	14	(4)
2018–2022	England U21	20	(1)
- * Club domestic league appearances and goals as of 17 October 2026 (UTC)

Kouassi Ryan Sessegnon (born 18 May 2000) is an English professional footballer who plays as a left-back, left midfielder, or left winger for Premier League club Fulham.

Sessegnon made his breakthrough in the Fulham senior side in 2016, aged 16. He made an instant impact, becoming the first footballer born in the 2000s to score a goal in a first-team game in the professional English leagues, and the youngest player to score in a Championship match. In 2017–18, his second season, Sessegnon helped Fulham achieve promotion to the Premier League via the play-offs, scoring fifteen goals and winning numerous personal awards. He totalled 120 games and 25 goals for Fulham, before joining Tottenham Hotspur for a £25 million fee in 2019. At the end of his five-year contract, which had also included a loan to TSG Hoffenheim in the German Bundesliga, Sessegnon rejoined Fulham in July 2024 on a free transfer.

== Early life and career ==
Sessegnon was born in Roehampton, Greater London into a family of Beninese and Ivorian descent. He has a twin brother, Steven, who plays for AFC Wimbledon, while their elder brother, Chris, is a semi-professional footballer. Sessegnon is also a cousin of the Beninese international footballer Stéphane Sessègnon. Sessegnon is also eligible for the Turks and Caicos Islands through his father.

As a child, Sessegnon, alongside brother Steven, played for local club Wandgas FC. In 2008, at the age of nine, the pair signed for Fulham, initially joining their under-9s side. Originally a central striker at youth level, he was moved to left back as he progressed. He has cited fellow left-sided players Luke Shaw and Gareth Bale as players he looked up to when he was young, saying, 'when Shaw was at Southampton he was a left-back and I loved watching him bomb up and down the wing, create goals, score goals, so I think I try to emulate that.'

Sessegnon attended Coombe Boys' School in New Malden, London, close to Fulham's Motspur Park training ground. With both brothers in the team, Coombe Boys won youth competition the ESFA PlayStation Schools' Cup in both 2014 and 2015, Ryan scoring twice in the 2015 final. By the 2015–16 season, Sessegnon had become a regular for Fulham's Under-18 side, despite only being 15.

== Club career ==
=== Fulham ===
==== 2016–17 season ====
Having started training with the first team, still aged 15, in March 2016, Sessegnon was promoted to the senior squad by manager of the year Slavisa Jokanovic for the 2016–17 pre-season. He scored his first senior goal on 19 July in a 3–0 friendly win over Brighton and Hove Albion.

On 9 August, Sessegnon made his first-team debut in an EFL Cup match against Leyton Orient aged 16 years and 81 days. On 16 August, he made his league debut in a Championship match against Leeds United in a 1–1 draw. On 20 August, he scored his first professional goal in a league match against Cardiff City, becoming the first professional footballer in the English leagues to have been born in the 2000s to score a goal in a first-team game and the youngest player to score in a Championship match. He scored the winner on his FA Cup debut, also against Cardiff, on 8 January, becoming one of the youngest goalscorers in the history of the competition.

On 11 March, Sessegnon scored twice in an away match against eventual league champions Newcastle United, with former Newcastle player Alan Shearer praising his performance as "brilliant". In total, Sessegnon made 30 appearances in all competitions, including in the second leg of Fulham's play-off semi-final defeat against Reading, scoring seven goals, and was named in the PFA Championship Team of the Year, the youngest player ever included.

Media interest in Sessegnon grew as his debut season progressed. In February 2017, Italian newspaper La Gazzetta dello Sport ranked Sessegnon as one of the top 30 Under-20s players in Europe, while in May 2017, Sports Illustrated named him as the 19th-best under-20 player in world football. Fulham striker Neeskens Kebano called him "the future of English football", with teammate Stefan Johansen saying it was "99% certain he will be one of the top left-backs in the world".

As the summer transfer window approached, interest was reported from numerous Premier League clubs, including Everton, Liverpool and Manchester United, with Sessegnon potentially available for a compensation fee of £2 million as Football Association rules meant he could not sign professional terms until his 17th birthday on 18 May 2017. However, on 28 June 2017, it was announced Sessegnon had signed his first professional contract with Fulham, committing him to the club until 2020. Sessegnon cited the likelihood of playing regularly in the first team as his reason, saying, "Last season I got a lot of opportunities so I want to continue that. When you are young you just want to play as many games as you can."

==== 2017–18 season ====
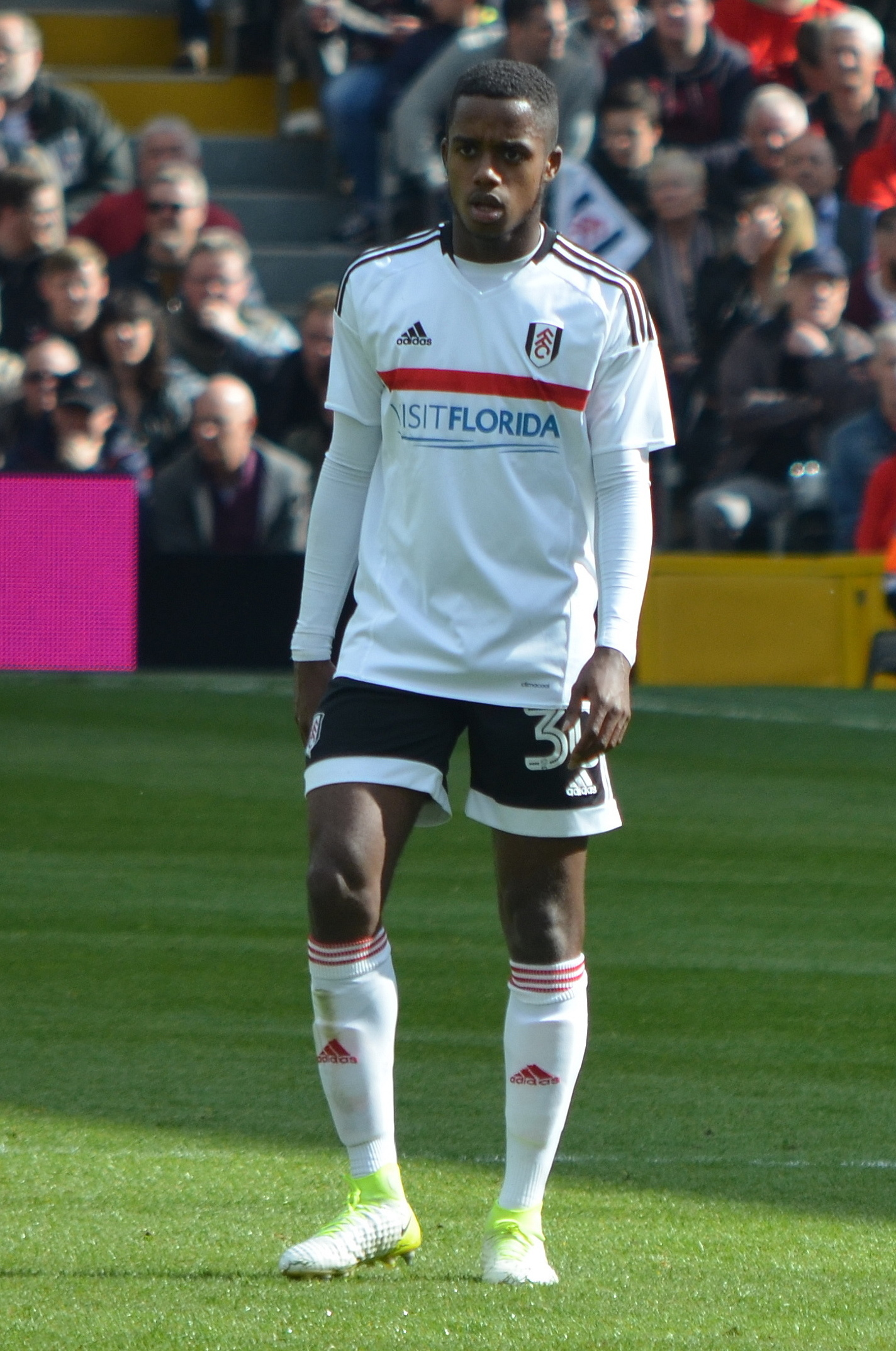
Sessegnon playing for Fulham in 2017

On 28 July 2017, Fulham announced that Sessegnon would wear the number 3 shirt, moving from his previous number 30. He scored his first goal of the season in a 1–1 draw with Cardiff on 9 September. In November 2017, FourFourTwo included Sessegnon in their 100 Best Teenagers in the World list, comparing him with Ashley Cole and David Alaba. On 21 November 2017, Sessegnon marked his 50th appearance for Fulham by scoring his first professional hat-trick in a 5–4 away victory against Sheffield United – becoming the first seventeen-year-old to score a hat-trick in the top four tiers of English league football since Dele Alli in 2014. After netting six goals in January 2018, courtesy of braces against Ipswich Town, Burton Albion and Barnsley, Sessegnon was named PFA and Championship Player of the Month. On 19 February, Sessegnon was named tenth in the most promising under 20 prospects in the whole of Europe. Sessegnon featured in a prestigious list by CIES with the likes of Milan goalkeeper Gianluigi Donnarumma featuring in 1st place and Paris Saint-Germain striker Kylian Mbappé in 3rd place.

In April 2018 he was nominated for the EFL Championship Player of the Season and Young Player of the Season awards. He also became the first Championship player to be nominated for the PFA Young Player of the Year award. On 15 April, Sessegnon won an unprecedented five awards when he was named Championship Player of the Season, Young Player of the Season, Apprentice of the Year, and named in the Team of the Season and EFL Club Developed XI.

Fulham finished the league season in third place, allowing them to advance to the play-offs, where Sessegnon helped his side secure a place in the play-off final by scoring the opening goal and assisting the game-winning goal in the semi-final second leg against Derby County. On 26 May, Sessegnon assisted Tom Cairney's 23rd-minute goal in a 1–0 win against Aston Villa in the Championship play-off final at Wembley to secure Fulham's promotion to the Premier League.

==== 2018–19 season ====
Sessegnon made his first Premier League appearance on 11 August 2018, the opening day of the new league campaign, in a 2–0 home defeat to Crystal Palace. On 20 October, he scored his first Premier League goal in a 4–2 away loss to Cardiff City, becoming the first player born in the 2000s to score in the competition. He made his 100th appearance for the club on 8 December, starting in a 4–1 league loss to Manchester United.

On 2 April 2019, Fulham suffered an early relegation from the Premier League following a 4–1 loss to Watford.

=== Tottenham Hotspur ===
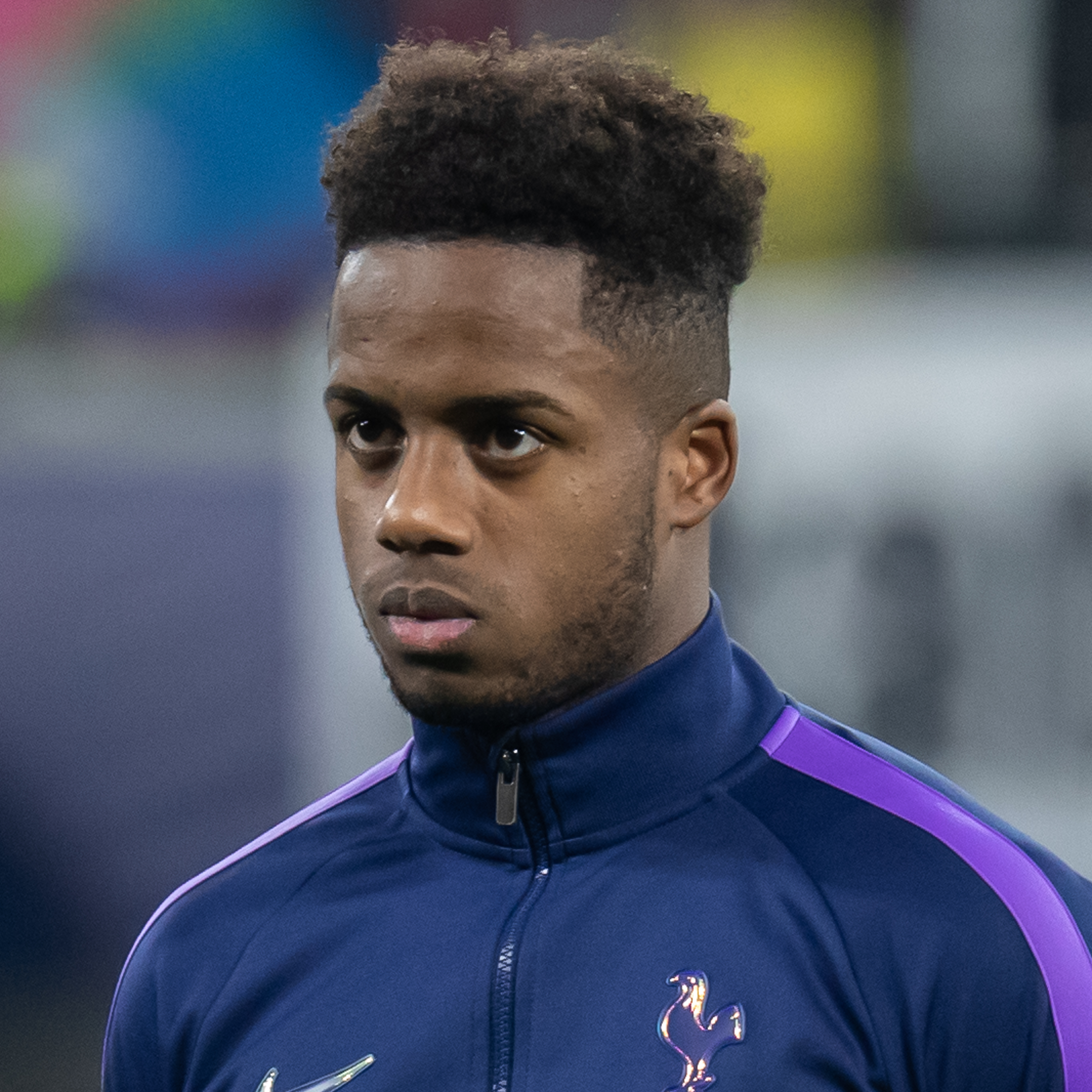
Sessegnon with Tottenham Hotspur in 2020

On 8 August 2019, Sessegnon signed for Tottenham Hotspur on a five-year deal with an optional one-year extension. The deal was reported to be worth £25 million which also saw Josh Onomah go to Fulham. Due to injury, Sessegnon did not make his debut for Tottenham until the beginning of November. He came on late into injury time in a match against Everton which ended 1–1. His Champions League debut came in the following match, as he came off of the bench against Red Star Belgrade and assisted a goal for Christian Eriksen. He had his first start in a Tottenham shirt in the Champions League away against Bayern Munich in December, where he scored his first goal for the club, becoming the youngest Spurs player to score in a Champions League game.

On 5 October 2020, Sessegnon joined TSG Hoffenheim on a season-long loan deal. Hoffenheim fans voted him player of the month for November.

Sessegnon scored his first league goal for Tottenham in a 4–1 victory against Southampton on the opening day of the 2022–23 Premier League season. He would score the opener in a 3–2 win against AFC Bournemouth in which Spurs came back from two goals down.

Sessegnon was released by Tottenham at the end of the 2023–24 season.

=== Return to Fulham ===
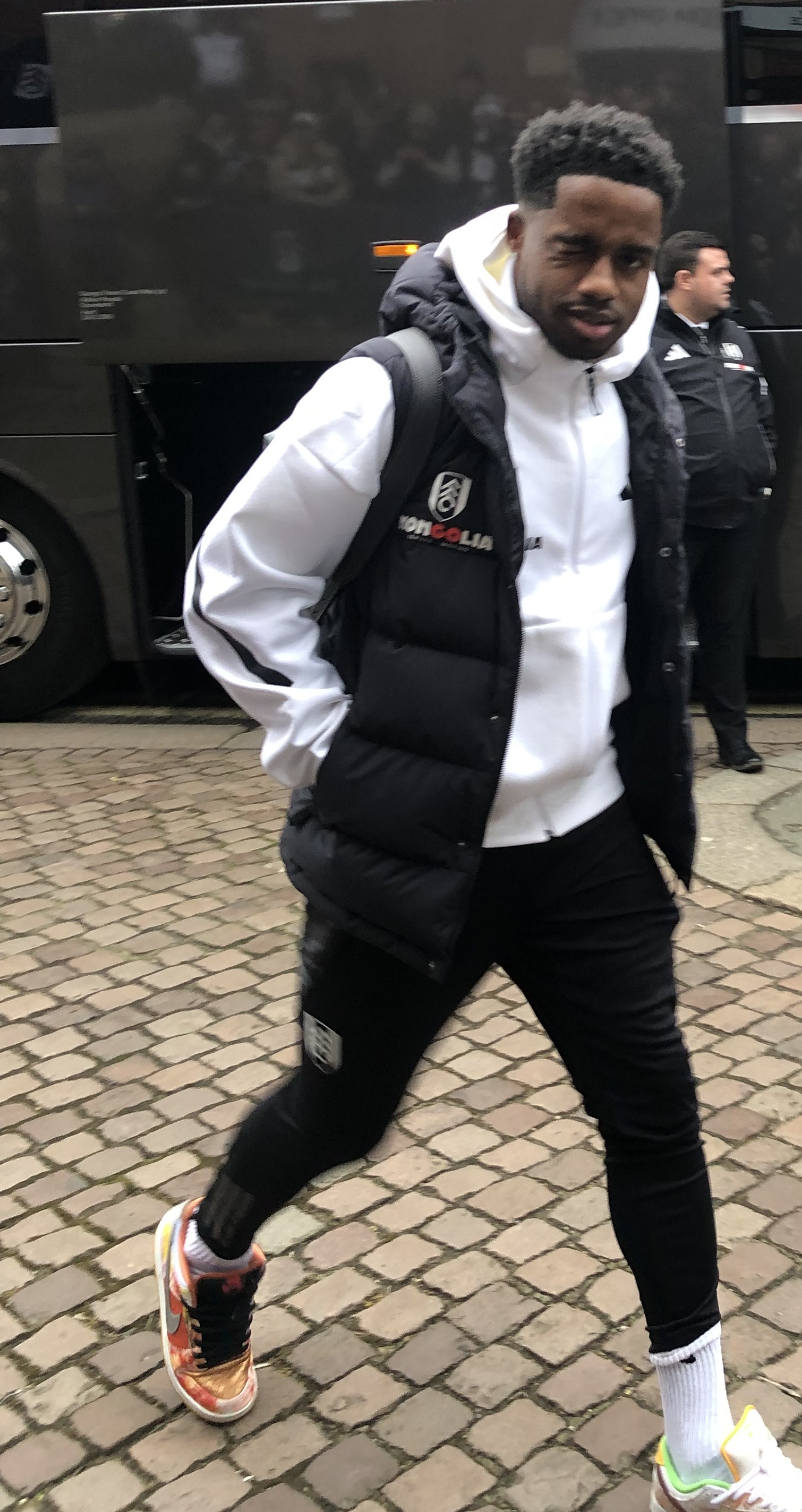
Sessegnon in 2024

Sessegnon re-joined Fulham on 26 July 2024 on a free transfer, signing a two-year contract with the option of an additional year. On 27 August, he made his first appearance since rejoining Fulham in a 2–0 win over Birmingham City in the second round of the EFL Cup.

After making only four substitute appearances in the Premier League, Sessegnon made his first league start in an away match against Wolverhampton Wanderers on 25 February 2025. He scored his first goal of the season 58 seconds into the match, with Fulham going on to win 2–1. On 16 March 2025, he scored the second goal of 2–0 home victory against Tottenham Hotspur, 57 seconds after replacing Willian as a substitute. Sessegnon's third goal in five matches came in a 3–2 win over Liverpool on 6 April, a result which ended the eventual champions' 26-match unbeaten run. Sessegnon's winning goal in the second minute of stoppage time in a 2–1 win at Southampton took him to six goal involvements in eight matches. His form saw him shortlisted for April's Premier League Player of the Month award.

After missing the opening match of the 2025–26 Premier League season through injury, Sessegnon started regularly at left back for Fulham until sustaining a hamstring strain in early December. During that period, he scored twice from 13 appearances.

== International career ==
In 2016, Sessegnon played up an age group to represent England in the U17 Euros. He scored his first goal for England Under-19s against Luxembourg in a European Under-19 Championship qualifier on 10 November 2016, scoring the second goal in a 2–0 win.

On 26 June 2017, Sessegnon was named in the final 18-man squad for the Euro U19s finals. He went on to score three goals, including two in a 4–1 win over Germany, finishing the tournament as joint-top scorer as England were crowned champions for the first time. He was subsequently included in the team of the tournament.

Aged 17, Sessegnon made his debut for England Under-21s on 27 March 2018, starting in a 2–1 European Under-21 Championship qualifier win over Ukraine.

On 27 May 2019, Sessegnon was included in England's 23-man squad for the 2019 UEFA European Under-21 Championship.

== Guinness World Record ==
On 27 May 2019, Sessegnon achieved the Guinness World Records title for 'Fastest time to hit both football goal posts and crossbar', doing so in just 7.75 seconds.

== Career statistics ==
As of match played 17 October 2026

Appearances and goals by club, season and competition
Club	Season	League			National cup (Note: Includes FA Cup, DFB-Pokal)		League cup (Note: Includes EFL Cup)		Europe		Other		Total	
Club	Season	Division	Apps	Goals	Apps	Goals	Apps	Goals	Apps	Goals	Apps	Goals	Apps	Goals
Fulham	2016–17	Championship	25	5	3	2	1	0	—		1 (Note: Appearance(s) in Championship play-offs)	0	30	7
Fulham	2017–18	Championship	46	15	1	0	2	0	—		3	1	52	16
Fulham	2018–19	Premier League	35	2	1	0	2	0	—		—		38	2
Fulham	Total		106	22	5	2	5	0	—		4	1	120	25
Tottenham Hotspur	2019–20	Premier League	6	0	3	0	0	0	3 (Note: Appearances in UEFA Champions League)	1	—		12	1
Tottenham Hotspur	2021–22	Premier League	15	0	2	0	1	0	3 (Note: Appearances in UEFA Europa Conference League)	0	—		21	0
Tottenham Hotspur	2022–23	Premier League	17	2	2	0	1	0	3	0	—		23	2
Tottenham Hotspur	2023–24	Premier League	0	0	1	0	0	0	—		—		1	0
Tottenham Hotspur	Total		38	2	8	0	2	0	9	1	—		57	3
TSG Hoffenheim (loan)	2020–21	Bundesliga	23	2	1	0	—		5 (Note: Appearances in UEFA Europa League)	0	—		29	2
Fulham	2024–25	Premier League	16	4	4	0	2	0	—		—		22	4
Fulham	2025–26	Premier League	27	3	2	0	2	0	—		—		31	3
Fulham	2026–27	Premier League	5	1	0	0	1	0	—		—		6	1
Fulham	Total		48	8	6	0	5	0	—		—		59	8
Career total			215	34	20	2	13	0	14	1	4	1	266	38

== Honours ==
Fulham

- EFL Championship play-offs: 2018

England U19

- UEFA European Under-19 Championship: 2017

Individual

- PFA Fans' Player of the Year: 2017–18 Championship
- PFA Team of the Year: 2016–17 Championship, 2017–18 Championship
- PFA Championship Player of the Month: January 2018
- EFL Championship Player of the Year: 2017–18
- EFL Young Player of the Year: 2017–18
- EFL Team of the Season: 2017–18
- EFL Championship Player of the Month: January 2018
- UEFA European Under-19 Championship Golden Boot: 2017
- UEFA European Under-19 Championship Team of the Tournament: 2017
- LFE Championship Apprentice of the Year: 2017–18
