= 2017–18 Fulham F.C. season =

Fulham
2017–18 season
- Chairman: Shahid Khan
- Manager: Slaviša Jokanović
- Stadium: Craven Cottage, Fulham
- Championship: 3rd (promoted via play-offs)
- FA Cup: Third round (lost to Southampton)
- EFL Cup: Second round (lost to Bristol Rovers)
- Top goalscorer: League: Ryan Sessegnon (15); All: Ryan Sessegnon (16)
- Highest home attendance: 24,547 (vs Aston Villa, Championship, 17 February 2017)
- Lowest home attendance: 6,243 (vs Bristol Rovers, EFL Cup, 22 August 2017)
- Average home league attendance: 19,896
Home colours	Away colours

The 2017–18 Fulham season was the club's 120th professional season and fourth consecutive in the EFL Championship after their relegation from the Premier League in the 2013–14 campaign. Fulham also competed in the FA Cup and the EFL Cup. They were promoted to the Premier League on 26 May 2018, by winning 1–0 in the 2018 EFL Championship play-off final against Aston Villa. The season covers the period from 1 July 2017 to 30 June 2018.

== Transfers ==
=== Transfers in ===
Date	Pos.	Name	Previous club	Fee	Source
3 July 2017	DF	(Guinea-Bissau) Marcelo Djaló	(Spain) Lugo	Undisclosed	
7 July 2017	MF	(Belgium) Ibrahima Cissé	(Belgium) Standard Liège	Undisclosed	
31 July 2017	FW	(Mauritania) Aboubakar Kamara	(France) Amiens SC	Undisclosed	
17 August 2017	FW	(Portugal) Rui Fonte	(Portugal) Braga	Undisclosed	
31 August 2017	FW	(France) Yohan Mollo	(Russia) Zenit Saint Petersburg	Free	
31 January 2018	DF	(Republic of Ireland) Cyrus Christie	(England) Middlesbrough	Undisclosed	

=== Loans in ===
Date	Pos.	Name	Parent club	End date	Source
14 July 2017	FW	(Brazil) Lucas Piazon	(England) Chelsea	30 June 2018	
25 July 2017	MF	(Northern Ireland) Oliver Norwood	(England) Brighton & Hove Albion	30 June 2018	
27 July 2017	DF	(Czech Republic) Tomáš Kalas	(England) Chelsea	30 June 2018	
16 August 2017	MF	(England) Sheyi Ojo	(England) Liverpool	30 June 2018	
22 August 2017	DF	(Portugal) Rafa Soares	(Portugal) FC Porto	31 January 2018	
31 August 2017	MF	(England) Jordan Graham	(England) Wolverhampton Wanderers	15 January 2018	
22 January 2018	DF	(England) Matt Targett	(England) Southampton	30 June 2018	
31 January 2018	FW	(Serbia) Aleksandar Mitrović	(England) Newcastle United	30 June 2018	

=== Transfers out ===
Date	Pos.	Name	Previous club	Fee	Source
26 May 2017	DF	(Australia) Cameron Burgess	(England) Scunthorpe United	Undisclosed	
26 May 2017	MF	(England) Larnell Cole	(England) Tranmere Rovers	Free	
26 May 2017	DF	(Scotland) Jack Grimmer	(England) Coventry City	Free	
26 May 2017	GK	(England) Josh Lukwata	Released		
26 May 2017	MF	(England) Scott Parker	Retired		
26 May 2017	DF	(England) Ryheem Sheckleford	Released		
26 May 2017	MF	(England) Josh Smile	(England) Chippenham Town	Free	
26 May 2017	GK	(Australia) Jake Soutter	Released		
26 May 2017	MF	(England) Cassian Thomas	Released		
26 May 2017	MF	(England) Ryan Tunnicliffe	(England) Millwall	Free	
26 May 2017	FW	(England) Josh Walker	(England) Hendon	Free	
4 July 2017	MF	(Spain) Jozabed	(Spain) Celta de Vigo	Undisclosed	
5 July 2017	DF	(England) Scott Malone	(England) Huddersfield Town	Undisclosed	
6 July 2017	DF	(England) Richard Stearman	(England) Sheffield United	Undisclosed	
10 July 2017	GK	(Finland) Jesse Joronen	(Denmark) AC Horsens	Free	
15 July 2017	FW	(Serbia) Nemanja Lazović	(Serbia) FK Crvena Zvezda	Undisclosed	
18 July 2017	MF	(Denmark) Lasse Vigen Christensen	(Denmark) Brøndby	Undisclosed	
29 August 2017	FW	(Nigeria) Sone Aluko	(England) Reading	Undisclosed	
31 August 2017	MF	(England) Dennis Adeniran	(England) Everton	Undisclosed	
16 January 2018	DF	(Austria) Michael Madl	Austria Wien	Undisclosed	
19 January 2018	DF	(Iceland) Ragnar Sigurðsson	(Russia) Rostov	Undisclosed	
25 January 2018	MF	(Poland) Mikolaj Kwietniewski	(Poland) Legia Warsaw	Undisclosed	
30 January 2018	FW	(France) Yohan Mollo	Released		
22 February 2018	DF	(Republic of Ireland) Sean Kavanagh	(Republic of Ireland) Shamrock Rovers	Undisclosed	

=== Loans out ===
Date	Pos.	Name	To	End date	Source
3 August 2017	DF	(Iceland) Ragnar Sigurðsson	(Russia) Rubin Kazan	18 January 2018	
17 August 2017	FW	(England) Cauley Woodrow	(England) Bristol City	30 June 2018	
30 August 2017	GK	(Slovakia) Marek Rodák	(England) Rotherham United	30 June 2018	
24 November 2017	MF	(England) Isaac Pearce	(England) Bath City	2 January 2018	
31 January 2018	FW	(Wales) George Williams	(Scotland) St. Johnstone	30 June 2018	
31 January 2018	FW	(England) Stephen Humphrys	(England) Rochdale	30 June 2018	
31 January 2018	MF	(Estonia) Mattias Kait	(Scotland) Ross County	30 June 2018	

== Pre-season ==
=== Friendlies ===
Fulham announced five pre-season friendlies against Piast Gliwice, FC Zlin, Wolfsburg, West Ham United and Darmstadt 98.

A further friendly against Queens Park Rangers was played behind closed doors on the 12 July.

5 July 2017	Piast Gliwice	0–1	Fulham	Opalenica, Poland
17:00 CEST		Report	Kebano 39' (pen.)	Stadium: Remes Hotel

8 July 2017	FC Fastav Zlín	2–2	Fulham	Grodzisk Wielkopolski, Poland
17:00 CEST	Bartolomeu 80'; Diop 82'	Report	Aluko 29' de la Torre 72'	Stadium: Dyskobolia Stadium

12 July 2017	Fulham	4–2	Queens Park Rangers	New Malden
17:00 BST	Cissé 15'; Aluko 35'; O'Riley 49'; Johansen 53'	Report	Darbyshire 26'; Kakay 88'	Stadium: Motspur Park

20 July 2017	Fulham	1–2	West Ham United	Graz, Austria
19:00 CEST	Woodrow 82'	Report	Lanzini 14'; Fletcher 40'	Stadium: Sportzentrum Weinzödl

22 July 2017	Darmstadt 98	2–2	Fulham	Darmstadt, Germany
15:30 CEST	Sulu 42'; Mehlem 69'	Report	Sulu 17' (o.g.); Fredericks 64'	Stadium: Merck-Stadion am Böllenfalltor

29 July 2017	Fulham	0–3	Wolfsburg	Fulham
15:00 BST		Report	Brooks 36'; Gómez 79', 84'	Stadium: Craven Cottage

== Competitions ==
=== Overall ===
Competition	Started round	Current position / round	Final position / round	First match	Last match
Championship	—	3rd		5 August 2017	6 May 2018
League Cup	First round	—	Second round	8 August 2017	22 August 2017
FA Cup	Third round	—		6 January 2018	6 January 2018

Updated to match played 14 October 2017
Source: Competitions

=== EFL Championship ===
==== League table ====
Pos	Team	Pld	W	D	L	GF	GA	GD	Pts	Promotion, qualification or relegation
1	Wolverhampton Wanderers (C, P)	46	30	9	7	82	39	+43	99	Promotion to the Premier League
2	Cardiff City (P)	46	27	9	10	69	39	+30	90	Promotion to the Premier League
3	Fulham (O, P)	46	25	13	8	79	46	+33	88	Qualification for Championship play-offs (Note: Four teams play for one spot and promotion to the Premier League.)
4	Aston Villa	46	24	11	11	72	42	+30	83	Qualification for Championship play-offs
5	Middlesbrough	46	22	10	14	67	45	+22	76	Qualification for Championship play-offs

Source: English Football League
Rules for classification: 1) Points; 2) Goal difference; 3) Number of goals scored
(C) Champions; (O) Play-off winners; (P) Promoted

==== Results summary ====
Overall								Home						Away					
Pld	W	D	L	GF	GA	GD	Pts	W	D	L	GF	GA	GD	W	D	L	GF	GA	GD
46	25	13	8	79	46	+33	88	13	8	2	40	17	+23	12	5	6	39	29	+10

Last updated: 28 April 2018.
Source: Sky Sports

==== Results by matchday ====
Matchday	1	2	3	4	5	6	7	8	9	10	11	12	13	14	15	16	17	18	19	20	21	22	23	24	25	26	27	28	29	30	31	32	33	34	35	36	37	38	39	40	41	42	43	44	45	46
Ground	H	A	A	H	A	H	H	A	H	A	A	H	A	H	H	A	H	A	H	A	H	A	H	A	A	H	A	H	A	H	A	H	A	H	A	H	A	H	A	H	A	H	H	A	H	A
Result	D	D	D	L	W	D	W	L	D	W	W	D	L	D	L	L	D	W	W	L	W	L	W	W	D	W	W	W	W	W	D	W	D	W	W	W	W	D	W	W	W	W	D	W	W	L
Position	10	12	15	19	14	12	13	14	14	11	8	9	11	13	16	16	17	14	12	15	12	12	11	11	12	10	8	7	6	5	5	5	5	5	4	4	4	3	3	3	3	2	3	3	3	3

Source: Statto.com
A = Away; H = Home; W = Win; D = Draw; L = Loss

==== Matches ====
On 21 June 2017, the league fixtures were announced.

5 August 2017 1	Fulham	1–1	Norwich City	Craven Cottage, London
15:00 BST	Martin 25' (o.g.); Cairney (yellow card) 66'; Johansen (yellow card) 85'; Fredericks (yellow card) 88'	Report	Oliveira 88', (yellow card) 89'; Maddison (yellow card) 90+4'	Attendance: 20,134; Referee: James Linington

12 August 2017 2	Reading	1–1	Fulham	Madejski Stadium, Reading
15:00 BST	Kelly 61'; Moore (yellow card) 70'; Ilori (yellow card) 71'; Swift (yellow card) 73'	Report	Kalas (red card) 1'; Piazon 82'; Kamara (yellow card) 90+4'	Attendance: 17,398; Referee: Simon Hooper

15 August 2017 3	Leeds United	0–0	Fulham	Elland Road, Leeds
19:45 BST	Phillips (yellow card) 65'; Anita (yellow card) 83'	Report	R Sessegnon (yellow card) 49'	Attendance: 28,918; Referee: Darren Bond

19 August 2017 4	Fulham	0–1	Sheffield Wednesday	Craven Cottage, London
15:00 BST	McDonald (yellow card) 74'; Fredericks (yellow card) 90+1'	Report	Fletcher 64'	Attendance: 20,165; Referee: Stuart Attwell

26 August 2017 5	Ipswich Town	0–2	Fulham	Portman Road, Ipswich
15:00 BST	Iorfa (yellow card) 31'	Report	Kebano 35'; Fonte 51'	Attendance: 16,844; Referee: Paul Tierney

9 September 2017 6	Fulham	1–1	Cardiff City	Craven Cottage, London
15:00 BST	Mollo (yellow card) 29'; McDonald (yellow card) 70'; Johansen (yellow card) 71'; Sessegnon 75'; Button (yellow card) 82'	Report	Bennett (yellow card) 30'; Morrison (yellow card) 36'; Peltier (yellow card) 79'; Ward 83'	Attendance: 20,984; Referee: Tony Harrington

13 September 2017 7	Fulham	2–1	Hull City	Craven Cottage, London
19:45 BST	Ayité 42'; Johansen 62'	Report	Bowen 53'	Attendance: 15,792; Referee: Tim Robinson

16 September 2017 8	Burton Albion	2–1	Fulham	Pirelli Stadium, Burton
15:00 BST	Warnock 12'; Akins 51' (pen.); McFadzean (yellow card) 86'	Report	Norwood 31'; Ojo (yellow card) 40'	Attendance: 4,049; Referee: Stephen Martin

23 September 2017 9	Fulham	1–1	Middlesbrough	Craven Cottage, London
15:00 BST	Kamara 86'	Report	Christie 88'	Attendance: 20,718; Referee: Oliver Langford

26 September 2017 10	Nottingham Forest	1–3	Fulham	City Ground, Nottingham
19:45 BST	Murphy 33'; Worrall (yellow card) 55'; Mills (yellow card) 71'	Report	Kamara 13'; Johansen 72'; Kebano 89'	Attendance: 21,208; Referee: Scott Duncan

29 September 2017 11	Queens Park Rangers	1–2	Fulham	Shepherd's Bush, London
19:45 BST	Luongo (yellow card) 17'; Mackie (yellow card) 22'; Lynch (yellow card) 83'; Washington 90+1'	Report	Robinson 41' (o.g.); Norwood (yellow card) 63'; Fredericks (yellow card) 64'; Johansen 85'; Button (yellow card) 86'	Stadium: Loftus Road Stadium; Attendance: 16,415; Referee: Peter Bankes

14 October 2017 12	Fulham	2–2	Preston North End	Craven Cottage, London
15:00 BST	Cairney (yellow card) 67'; Norwood 74' (pen.); Odoi 90+6'	Report	Hugill 18'; Maguire 25'; Earl (yellow card) 39'; Johnson (yellow card) 51'; Woods (yellow card) 73'	Attendance: 18,435; Referee: Darren England

21 October 2017 13	Aston Villa	2–1	Fulham	Aston
15:00 BST	Terry 23'; Adomah 49'; Onomah (yellow card) 82'	Report	Norwood (yellow card) 9'; Fonte (yellow card) 15'; Johansen 45+1'	Stadium: Villa Park; Attendance: 30,724; Referee: Mike Jones

28 October 2017 14	Fulham	1–1	Bolton Wanderers	Fulham
15:00 BST	McDonald (yellow card) 86'; Cairney 90+3'	Report	Henry (yellow card) 12'; Ameobi 28'; Wheater (yellow card) 57'; Alnwick (yellow card) 78'; Little (yellow card) 84'	Stadium: Craven Cottage; Attendance: 18,792; Referee: Geoff Eltringham

31 October 2017 15	Fulham	0–2	Bristol City	Fulham
19:45 GMT	Kamara (red card) 63'	Report	Reid 29'; Smith 40'; Flint (yellow card) 61'; Bryan (yellow card) 90+1'	Stadium: Craven Cottage; Attendance: 17,634; Referee: Scott Duncan

3 November 2017 16	Wolverhampton Wanderers	2–0	Fulham	Wolverhampton
19:45	Saïss 9' (yellow card) 42'; Bonatini 26'; Douglas (yellow card) 53'	Report	Johansen (yellow card) 1'; Norwood (yellow card) 12'; Sessegnon (yellow card) 25'; McDonald (yellow card) 49'	Stadium: Molineux Stadium; Attendance: 24,338; Referee: David Coote

18 November 2017 17	Fulham	1–1	Derby County	Fulham
15:00 GMT	Norwood 30'; Odoi (yellow card) 53'	Report	Vydra 50'	Stadium: Craven Cottage; Attendance: 18,192; Referee: Darren Bond

21 November 2017 18	Sheffield United	4–5	Fulham	Sheffield
19:45 GMT	Clarke 6', 39', 90+1'; Sharp (yellow card) 33'; Lundstram (yellow card) 45+4'; Carruthers 86'; Brooks (yellow card) 90+3'	Report	Ojo 28', 69'; Sessegnon 30', 43', 78'; Fredericks (yellow card) 33'; Ayité (yellow card) 45+2'; Odoi (yellow card) 73'; Kamara (yellow card) 90+6'	Stadium: Bramall Lane; Attendance: 25,445; Referee: James Linington

25 November 2017 19	Fulham	1–0	Millwall	Fulham
15:00 GMT	Norwood 45+2' (pen.)	Report	McLaughlin (yellow card) 45+1'; Saville (yellow card) 72'	Stadium: Craven Cottage; Attendance: 17,984; Referee: Paul Tierney

2 December 2017 20	Brentford	3–1	Fulham	Brentford
15:00 GMT	Canós 33' (yellow card) 36'; Sawyers 49'; Watkins 85'	Report	Kebano 25'; Odoi (yellow card) 45' (yellow-red card) 53'; Cairney (yellow card) 59'; Fredericks (yellow card) 82'; Norwood (yellow card) 89'	Stadium: Griffin Park; Attendance: 11,090; Referee: Bobby Madley

9 December 2017 21	Fulham	1–0	Birmingham City	Fulham
15:00 GMT	Ojo 14'; Norwood (yellow card) 61'	Report	Davis (yellow card) 87'	Stadium: Craven Cottage; Attendance: 19,644; Referee: Tony Harrington

16 December 2017 22	Sunderland	1–0	Fulham	Sunderland
	Maja 77'	Report		Stadium: Stadium of Light; Attendance: 25,904; Referee: Steve Martin

23 December 2017 23	Fulham	2–1	Barnsley	London
15:00 GMT	Ojo (yellow card) 28', (goal) 72'; Ayité 54'	Report	Yiadom (yellow card) 4'; Gardner (yellow card) 14'; Bradshaw 68'	Stadium: Craven Cottage; Attendance: 17,308; Referee: James Linington

26 December 2017 24	Cardiff City	2–4	Fulham	Cardiff
15:00 GMT	Zohore 57'; Ralls (yellow card) 90'; Paterson 90+2'	Report	Ream 12'; Ayité (yellow card) 34', (goal) 56'; Fredericks (yellow card) 43'; Sessegnon 78'; Odoi (yellow card) 82'; Bettinelli (yellow card) 90+2'; Johansen 90+7'	Stadium: Cardiff City Stadium; Attendance: 21,662; Referee: Simon Hooper (Wiltshire)

30 December 2017 25	Hull City	2–2	Fulham	Kingston upon Hull
15:00 GMT	Bowen 32'; Dicko 36'	Report	Kamara 48' (pen.), 85'	Stadium: KCOM Stadium; Attendance: 15,701; Referee: David Webb

2 January 2018 26	Fulham	4–1	Ipswich Town	Fulham
19:45 GMT	Sessegnon 69', 74'; Kamara 72', 76'	Report	Garner 45'; Spence (red card) 54'	Stadium: Craven Cottage; Attendance: 17,415; Referee: Keith Stroud

13 January 2018 27	Middlesbrough	0–1	Fulham	Middlesbrough
15:00 GMT		Report	Norwood 90+5' (pen.)	Stadium: Riverside Stadium; Attendance: 23,850; Referee: Geoff Eltringham

20 January 2018 28	Fulham	6–0	Burton Albion	Fulham
15:00 GMT	Fonte 18', 38'; Piazon 34'; Sessegnon 72', 79'; Kamara 88'	Report		Stadium: Craven Cottage; Attendance: 19,003; Referee: Tim Robinson

27 January 2018 29	Barnsley	1–3	Fulham	Barnsley
15:00 GMT	Lindsay 31'; Cavare (red card) 45+1'	Report	Sessegnon 49', 90+5'; McDonald 90+2'	Stadium: Oakwell; Attendance: 12,147; Referee: Andy Davies

3 February 2018 30	Fulham	2–0	Nottingham Forest	Fulham
15:00 GMT	Piazon 67'; Johansen 90'	Report		Stadium: Craven Cottage; Attendance: 22,076; Referee: Tim Robinson

10 February 2018 31	Bolton Wanderers	1–1	Fulham	Horwich
15:00 GMT	Little (yellow card) 17'; Henry (yellow card) 45+2'; Le Fondre 61'	Report	Targett 4'; Johansen (yellow card) 60'	Stadium: Macron Stadium; Attendance: 14,386; Referee: Robert Jones

17 February 2018 32	Fulham	2–0	Aston Villa	Fulham
15:00 GMT	Sessegnon 52'; Ayité 71'	Report		Stadium: Craven Cottage; Attendance: 24,547; Referee: Tony Harrington

21 February 2018 33	Bristol City	1–1	Fulham	Bristol
19:45 GMT	Reid 35'	Report	Mitrović 14'	Stadium: Ashton Gate; Attendance: 21,236; Referee: Jeremy Sampson

24 February 2018 34	Fulham	2–0	Wolverhampton Wanderers	Fulham
17:30 GMT	Sessegnon 38'; Mitrović 71'	Report		Stadium: Craven Cottage; Attendance: 23,510; Referee: Peter Bankes

3 March 2018 35	Derby County	1–2	Fulham	Derby
15:00 GMT	Huddlestone 68'	Report	Mitrović 10'; Sessegnon 22'	Stadium: Pride Park Stadium; Attendance: 27,138; Referee: Lee Mason

6 March 2018 36	Fulham	3–0	Sheffield United	Fulham
19:45 GMT	Mitrović 31', 44'; Cairney 61'	Report		Stadium: Craven Cottage; Attendance: 18,400; Referee: Keith Stroud

10 March 2018 37	Preston North End	1–2	Fulham	Preston
15:00 GMT	Maguire 76'	Report	Mitrović 69', 90+1'	Stadium: Deepdale; Attendance: 12,970; Referee: Simon Hooper

17 March 2018 38	Fulham	2–2	Queens Park Rangers	Fulham
12:30 GMT	Cairney 32'; Piazon 45'	Report	Luongo 45+3'; Wszołek 81'	Stadium: Craven Cottage; Attendance: 23,347; Referee: Chris Kavanagh

30 March 2018 39	Norwich City	0–2	Fulham	Norwich
15:00 BST	Murphy (yellow card) 83'; Maddison (yellow card) 90+1'; Reed (yellow card) 90+4'	Report	McDonald (yellow card) 58'; Johansen 66'; Cairney 70'; Fredericks (yellow card) 78'; Norwood (yellow card) 85'; Kamara (yellow card) 90+3'	Stadium: Carrow Road; Attendance: 26,750; Referee: Keith Stroud

3 April 2018 40	Fulham	2–0	Leeds United	Fulham
19:45 BST	McDonald 33', (yellow card) 69'; Mitrović 63'; Bettinelli (yellow card) 68'; Johansen (yellow card) 78'	Report	Jansson (yellow card) 43'; Phillips (yellow card) 90'	Stadium: Craven Cottage; Attendance: 21,538; Referee: Peter Bankes

7 April 2018 41	Sheffield Wednesday	0–1	Fulham	Sheffield
16:00 BST	Pudil (yellow card) 85'; Butterfield (yellow card) 90+1'	Report	Mitrović 78'	Stadium: Hillsborough; Attendance: 25,653; Referee: Steve Martin

10 April 2018 42	Fulham	1–0	Reading	Fulham
19:45 BST	Johansen 25'	Report		Stadium: Craven Cottage; Attendance: 19,272; Referee: Lee Mason

14 April 2018 43	Fulham	1–1	Brentford	Fulham
18:30 BST	Mitrović 70'	Report	Maupay 90+4'	Stadium: Craven Cottage; Referee: Neil Swarbrick

20 April 2018 44	Millwall	0–3	Fulham	Bermondsey
19:45 BST	Hutchinson (yellow card) 62'; Wallace (yellow card) 82'; Cahill (yellow card) 88'; Gregory (yellow card) 90'	Report	Sessegnon 46'; McDonald 56'; Ream (yellow card) 71'; Mitrović 89'	Stadium: The Den; Attendance: 17,614; Referee: Andre Marriner

27 April 2018 45	Fulham	2–1	Sunderland	Fulham
19:45 BST	Piazon 45'; Mitrović 76'; Bettinelli (yellow card) 90+3'; Kamara (yellow card) 90+6'	Report	Asoro 28'; O'Shea (yellow card) 45'; Fletcher (yellow card) 61'; Steele (yellow card) 62'; McManaman (yellow card) 90+6'	Stadium: Craven Cottage; Attendance: 21,849; Referee: Peter Bankes

6 May 2018 46	Birmingham City	3–1	Fulham	Birmingham
12:30 BST	Jutkiewicz 15', Dean 43', Adams 89'	Report	Cairney 84'	Stadium: St Andrew's; Attendance: 27608; Referee: Stuart Attwell

==== Football League play-offs ====
11 May 2018 Semi final (1st leg)	Derby County	1–0	Fulham	Derby
19:45 BST	Jerome 34'; Weimann (yellow card) 78'; Johnson (yellow card) 86'	Report	Johansen (yellow card) 85'	Stadium: Pride Park Stadium; Attendance: 27,163; Referee: Roger East

14 May 2018 Semi final (2nd leg)	Fulham	2–0 (2–1 agg.)	Derby County	Fulham
19:45 BST	R Sessegnon 47'; Johansen (yellow card) 62'; Odoi 66'; Kamara (yellow card) 74'; McDonald (yellow card) 78'; Bettinelli (yellow card) 90'	Report	Huddlestone (yellow card) 77'; Palmer (yellow card) 78'	Stadium: Craven Cottage; Attendance: 23,529; Referee: Christopher Kavanagh

26 May 2018 Final	Aston Villa	0–1	Fulham	London
17:00 BST	Chester (yellow card) 8'; Grealish (yellow card) 63'; Jedinak (yellow card) 76'; Hutton (yellow card) 86'	Report	Cairney 23'; Odoi (yellow card) 38' (red card) 70'; Kamara (yellow card) 77'	Stadium: Wembley Stadium; Attendance: 85,243; Referee: Anthony Taylor

=== FA Cup ===
In the FA Cup, Fulham entered the competition in the third round and were drawn at home to Southampton.

6 January 2018 Third round	Fulham	0–1	Southampton	Fulham
15:00 GMT		Report	Ward-Prowse 29'	Stadium: Craven Cottage; Attendance: 17,327; Referee: Michael Oliver

=== EFL Cup ===
On 16 June 2017, Fulham drew Wycombe Wanderers in the first round. The second round confirmed a home tie against Bristol Rovers.

8 August 2017 First round	Wycombe Wanderers	0–2	Fulham	Adams Park, High Wycombe
19:45 BST		Report	Woodrow (yellow card) 32'; Piazon 67'; Odoi 81'	Attendance: 3,639; Referee: Gavin Ward

22 August 2017 Second round	Fulham	0–1	Bristol Rovers	Craven Cottage, London
19:45 BST		Report	Harrison 13'; Slocombe (yellow card) 85'; Gaffney (yellow card) 85'; Sweeney (yellow card) 90+3'	Attendance: 6,243; Referee: Dean Whitestone

== Squad statistics ==
=== Appearances and goals ===
Last updated 26 May 2018.

- Players listed with no appearances have been in the matchday squad but only as unused substitutes.

No.	Pos	Nat	Player	Total		Championship		Play-offs		EFL Cup		FA Cup	
No.	Pos	Nat	Player	Apps	Goals	Apps	Goals	Apps	Goals	Apps	Goals	Apps	Goals
1	GK	(England) ENG	Marcus Bettinelli	30	0	26+0	0	3+0	0	1+0	0	0+0	0
2	DF	(England) ENG	Ryan Fredericks	48	0	44+0	0	3+0	0	0+0	0	1+0	0
3	DF	(England) ENG	Ryan Sessegnon	52	16	45+1	15	3+0	1	0+2	0	1+0	0
4	DF	(Belgium) BEL	Denis Odoi	42	3	30+7	1	3+0	1	1+0	1	1+0	0
6	MF	(Scotland) SCO	Kevin McDonald	46	3	42+0	3	3+0	0	0+0	0	1+0	0
7	FW	(Democratic Republic of the Congo) COD	Neeskens Kebano	29	3	10+16	3	0+1	0	1+0	0	0+1	0
8	MF	(Norway) NOR	Stefan Johansen	49	8	43+2	8	3+0	0	0+0	0	1+0	0
9	FW	(Portugal) POR	Rui Fonte	28	3	16+11	3	0+0	0	0+0	0	1+0	0
10	MF	(Scotland) SCO	Tom Cairney	37	6	30+4	5	3+0	1	0+0	0	0+0	0
11	FW	(Togo) TOG	Floyd Ayité	29	4	23+5	4	1+0	0	0+0	0	0+0	0
13	DF	(United States) USA	Tim Ream	48	1	44+0	1	3+0	0	0+0	0	1+0	0
16	MF	(Northern Ireland) NIR	Oliver Norwood (on loan from Brighton & Hove Albion)	41	5	22+14	5	0+3	0	1+0	0	1+0	0
19	MF	(England) ENG	Sheyi Ojo (on loan from Liverpool)	24	4	18+4	4	0+0	0	1+0	0	0+1	0
20	FW	(Brazil) BRA	Lucas Piazon (on loan from Chelsea)	27	6	16+8	5	0+1	0	1+0	1	1+0	0
21	DF	(England) ENG	Matt Targett (on loan from Southampton)	21	1	17+1	1	3+0	0	0+0	0	0+0	0
22	DF	(Republic of Ireland) IRL	Cyrus Christie	6	0	1+4	0	0+1	0	0+0	0	0+0	0
23	DF	(Spain) ESP	Marcelo Djaló	4	0	0+2	0	0+0	0	2+0	0	0+0	0
26	DF	(Czech Republic) CZE	Tomáš Kalas (on loan from Chelsea)	36	0	29+4	0	0+2	0	0+0	0	1+0	0
27	GK	(England) ENG	David Button	21	0	20+0	0	0+0	0	0+0	0	1+0	0
32	FW	(Serbia) SRB	Aleksandar Mitrović (on loan from Newcastle United)	20	12	15+2	12	3+0	0	0+0	0	0+0	0
33	MF	(England) ENG	Matt O'Riley	2	0	0+0	0	0+0	0	2+0	0	0+0	0
36	MF	(United States) USA	Luca de la Torre	5	0	0+5	0	0+0	0	0+0	0	0+0	0
37	MF	(England) ENG	Tayo Edun	4	0	1+1	0	0+0	0	2+0	0	0+0	0
43	DF	(England) ENG	Steven Sessegnon	2	0	0+0	0	0+0	0	2+0	0	0+0	0
44	MF	(Belgium) BEL	Ibrahima Cissé	8	0	2+4	0	0+0	0	2+0	0	0+0	0
46	GK	(England) ENG	Magnus Norman	0	0	0+0	0	0+0	0	0+0	0	0+0	0
47	FW	(France) FRA	Aboubakar Kamara	35	7	8+22	7	2+0	0	2+0	0	0+1	0
Out on loan
14	FW	(England) ENG	Cauley Woodrow (on loan at Bristol City)	1	0	0+0	0	0+0	0	1+0	0	0+0	0
42	GK	(Slovakia) SVK	Marek Rodák (on loan at Rotherham United)	1	0	0+0	0	0+0	0	1+0	0	0+0	0
Left during season
5	DF	(Portugal) POR	Rafa Soares (on loan from FC Porto)	3	0	0+3	0	0+0	0	0+0	0	0+0	0
15	DF	(Austria) AUT	Michael Madl	2	0	0+0	0	0+0	0	2+0	0	0+0	0
17	MF	(England) ENG	Jordan Graham (on loan from Wolverhampton Wanderers)	3	0	0+3	0	0+0	0	0+0	0	0+0	0
22	FW	(France) FRA	Yohan Mollo	6	0	2+4	0	0+0	0	0+0	0	0+0	0
24	FW	(Nigeria) NGA	Sone Aluko	4	0	4+0	0	0+0	0	0+0	0	0+0	0

=== Top scorers ===
Includes all competitive matches. The list is sorted by squad number when total goals are equal.

Last updated 26 May 2018.

Rank	No.	Nationality	Player	Championship	Play-offs	EFL Cup	FA Cup	Total
1
1	3	(England)	Ryan Sessegnon	15	1	0	0	16
2
2	32	(Serbia)	Aleksandar Mitrović	12	0	0	0	12
3
3	8	(Norway)	Stefan Johansen	8	0	0	0	8
4
4	47	(France)	Aboubakar Kamara	7	0	0	0	7
5
5	10	(Scotland)	Tom Cairney	5	1	0	0	6
5	20	(Brazil)	Lucas Piazon	5	0	1	0	6
7
7	16	(Northern Ireland)	Oliver Norwood	5	0	0	0	5
8
8	11	(Togo)	Floyd Ayité	4	0	0	0	4
8	19	(England)	Sheyi Ojo	4	0	0	0	4
10
10	4	(Belgium)	Denis Odoi	1	1	1	0	3
10	6	(Scotland)	Kevin McDonald	3	0	0	0	3
10	7	(Democratic Republic of the Congo)	Neeskens Kebano	3	0	0	0	3
10	9	(Portugal)	Rui Fonte	3	0	0	0	3
14
14	13	(United States)	Tim Ream	1	0	0	0	1
14	21	(England)	Matt Targett	1	0	0	0	1
Own goals				2	0	0	0	2
TOTALS				79	3	2	0	84

=== Disciplinary record ===
Includes all competitive matches. The list is sorted by shirt number.

N	P	Nat.	Name	Championship			EFL Cup			FA Cup			Total			Notes
N	P	Nat.	Name	Yellow card	Second yellow card	Red card	Yellow card	Second yellow card	Red card	Yellow card	Second yellow card	Red card	Yellow card	Second yellow card	Red card	Notes
1	GK	(England)	Marcus Bettinelli	3									3			
2	DF	(England)	Ryan Fredericks	9									9			
3	DF	(England)	Ryan Sessegnon	2									2			
4	DF	(Belgium)	Dennis Odoi	4	1								4	1		
6	MF	(Scotland)	Kevin McDonald	9									9			
7	FW	(Democratic Republic of the Congo)	Neeskens Kebano	1									1			
8	MF	(Norway)	Stefan Johansen	10									10			
9	FW	(Portugal)	Rui Fonte	2									2			
10	MF	(Scotland)	Tom Cairney	3									3			
11	FW	(Togo)	Floyd Ayité	1									1			
13	DF	(United States)	Tim Ream	1									1			
16	MF	(England)	Oliver Norwood	6									6			(on loan from Brighton)
19	FW	(England)	Sheyi Ojo	3									3			
20	FW	(Brazil)	Lucas Piazon													(on loan from Chelsea)
26	DF	(England)	Matt Targett	1									1			(on loan from Southampton)
22	FW	(France)	Yohan Mollo	1									1			
26	DF	(Czech Republic)	Tomáš Kalas			1									1	(on loan from Chelsea)
27	GK	(England)	David Button	2									2			
32	FW	(Serbia)	Aleksandar Mitrović	2									2			(on loan from Newcastle)
47	FW	(France)	Aboubakar Kamara	3		1							3		1	
Out on loan
14	FW	(England)	Cauley Woodrow				1						1			(on loan at Bristol City)
TOTALS				62	1	2	1	0	0	0	0	0	63	1	2	

Last updated: 3 March 2018
Source: Sky Sports
Ordered by (red card) , (second yellow card) and (yellow card)
(yellow card) = Number of bookings; (second yellow card) = Number of sending offs after a second yellow card; (red card) = Number of sending offs by a direct red card.

==== Suspensions ====
Player	Date received	Offence	Length of suspension	
Tomáš Kalas	12 August 2017	(red card) vs Reading	1 match	Leeds United (A) (Championship)
Dennis Odoi	2 December 2017	(yellow card) (yellow-red card) vs Brentford	1 match	Birmingham City (H) (Championship)

Last updated: 13 September 2017.
Source: Football Association
