= Ibrahima Cissé (footballer, born 1994) =

Guinean footballer (born 1994)

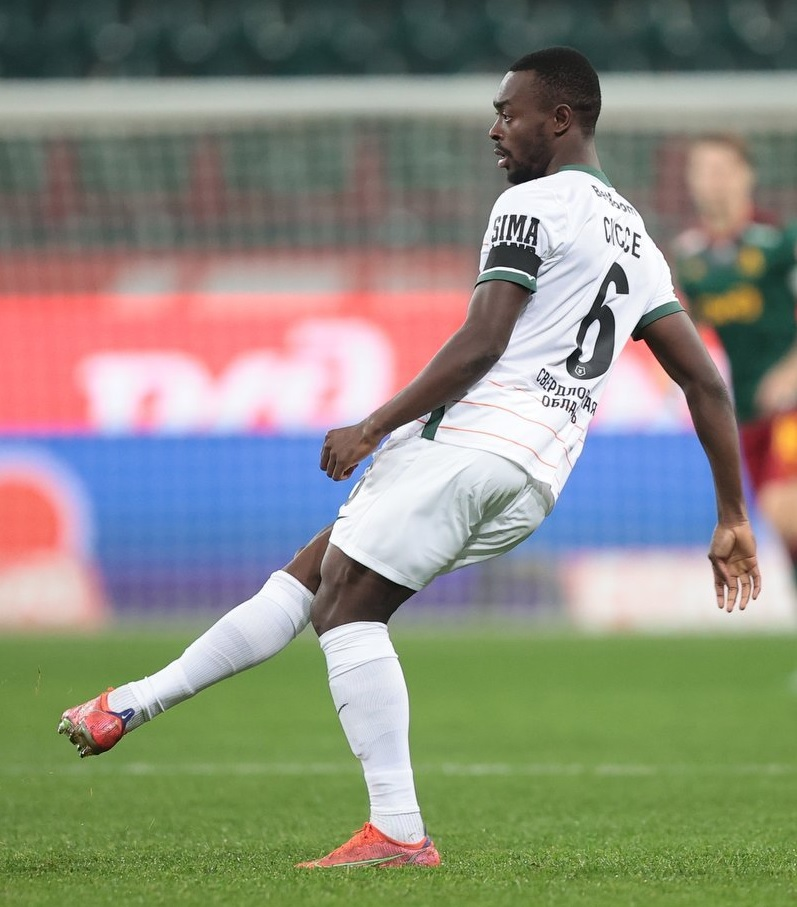
- Cissé with Ural Yekaterinburg in 2022

Personal information
- Full name: Ibrahima Cissé
- Date of birth: 28 February 1994 (age 32)
- Place of birth: Liège, Belgium
- Height: 1.84 m (6 ft 0 in)
- Positions: Defensive midfielder; right back

Team information
- Current team: Al Orooba
- Number: 44

Youth career
- 2005–2012: Standard Liège

Senior career*
Years	Team	Apps	(Gls)
2012–2014	Standard Liège	34	(1)
2014–2016	Mechelen	48	(1)
2016–2017	Standard Liège	22	(0)
2017–2020	Fulham	9	(0)
2020–2022	Seraing	33	(0)
2022–2024	Ural Yekaterinburg	38	(0)
2024–2025	Dibba Al-Hisn	25	(1)
2025–	Al Orooba	0	(0)

International career^{‡}
2010–2011	Belgium U17	14	(0)
2011	Belgium U18	2	(0)
2012	Belgium U19	3	(0)
2012–2015	Belgium U21	10	(0)
2018–	Guinea	20	(1)
- * Club domestic league appearances and goals as of 15 December 2024 ‡ National team caps and goals as of 23:47, 9 September 2023 (UTC)

Ibrahima Cissé (born 28 February 1994) is a professional footballer plays for Al Orooba. Born in Belgium, Cissé represents the Guinea national football team internationally.

== Career ==
=== Fulham ===
Fulham tried to sign Cissé from Belgium side Standard Liège in January 2017, but it took until 7 July 2017 that Fulham finally signed him for an undisclosed fee. Cissé was released by mutual consent from Fulham on 1 February 2020.

=== Ural Yekaterinburg ===
On 8 September 2022, Cissé signed with Ural Yekaterinburg in Russia. On 5 June 2024, Cissé left Ural as his contract expired.

== International career ==
Cissé was born in Belgium and is Guinean by descent. He was formerly a youth international for Belgium. However, he pledged his international allegiance to Guinea in March 2018.

On 25 April 2018, Cissé accepted an invitation to represent the Guinea national football team. He made his professional debut for Guinea in a 1–0 2019 Africa Cup of Nations qualification win over Central African Republic on 9 September 2018.

== Career statistics ==
=== Club ===
As of match played 1 June 2024

Appearances and goals by club, season and competition
Club	Season	League			National Cup		League Cup		Europe		Other		Total	
Club	Season	Division	Apps	Goals	Apps	Goals	Apps	Goals	Apps	Goals	Apps	Goals	Apps	Goals
Standard Liège	2011–12	Belgian Pro League	0	0	0	0	—		0	0	0	0	0	0
Standard Liège	2012–13	Belgian Pro League	18	1	0	0	—		—		—		18	1
Standard Liège	2013–14	Belgian Pro League	16	0	0	0	—		8 (Note: Appearances in the Europa League)	0	—		24	0
Standard Liège	Total		34	1	0	0	—		8	0	0	0	42	1
Mechelen	2014–15	Belgian Pro League	33	1	3	0	—		—		—		36	1
Mechelen	2015–16	Belgian Pro League	15	0	1	0	—		—		—		16	0
Mechelen	Total		48	1	4	0	—		0	0	0	0	52	1
Standard Liège	2016–17	Belgian Pro League	17	0	1	0	—		3	1	6 (Note: Five appearances in the First Division A Europa League play-offs and one in the Belgian Super Cup)	0	27	1
Fulham	2017–18	Championship	6	0	0	0	2	0	—		0	0	8	0
Fulham	2018–19	Premier League	3	0	1	0	1	0	—		0	0	5	0
Fulham	Total		9	0	1	0	3	0	0	0	0	0	13	0
Seraing	2020–21	Challenger Pro League	2	0	1	0	—		—		—		3	0
Seraing	2021–22	Belgian Pro League	31	0	2	0	—		—		2 (Note: Two appearances in the First Division A relegation play-offs)	0	35	0
Seraing	Total		33	0	3	0	0	0	0	0	2	0	38	0
Ural Yekaterinburg	2022–23	Russian Premier League	17	0	9	1	—		—		—		26	1
Ural Yekaterinburg	2023–24	Russian Premier League	21	0	3	0	—		—		2 (Note: Appearances in the relegation play-offs)	0	26	0
Ural Yekaterinburg	Total		38	0	12	1	—		—		2	0	52	1
Career total			179	2	21	1	3	0	11	1	10	0	224	4

=== International ===
As of matches played on 9 September 2023

Guinea national team
Year	Apps	Goals
2018	2	1
2019	7	0
2021	3	0
2022	7	0
2023	1	0
Total	20	1

=== International goals ===
Scores and results list Guinea's goal tally first.

No.	Date	Venue	Opponent	Score	Result	Competition
1.	12 October 2018	Stade du 28 Septembre, Conakry, Guinea	Rwanda	2–0	2–0	2019 Africa Cup of Nations qualification
