= 2018–19 Fulham F.C. season =

Fulham
2018–19 season
- Chairman: Shahid Khan
- Manager: Slaviša Jokanović (until 14 November); Claudio Ranieri (14 November – 28 February); Scott Parker (caretaker)
- Stadium: Craven Cottage
- Premier League: 19th (relegated)
- FA Cup: Third round
- EFL Cup: Fourth round
- Top goalscorer: League: Aleksandar Mitrović (11); All: Aleksandar Mitrović (11)
- Highest home attendance: 24,821 (vs Crystal Palace, Premier League, 11 August 2018)
- Lowest home attendance: 9,333 (vs Exeter City, EFL Cup, 28 August 2018)
- Average home league attendance: 24,371
- Biggest win: 2–0 (vs Exeter City, EFL Cup, 28 August 2018)
- Biggest defeat: 1–5 (vs Arsenal, Premier League, 7 October 2018)
Home colours	Away colours	Third colours

The 2018–19 Fulham season was the club's 121st professional season and their 14th in the Premier League, after the club won promotion from the EFL Championship after defeating Aston Villa in the 2018 EFL Championship play-off final at Wembley Stadium on 26 May 2018. The club also competed in the FA Cup and the EFL Cup.

== Kits ==
Home	Home alt. 1	Home alt. 2	Home alt. 3	Away	Away alt. 1	Third	Third alt. 1	Third alt. 2	Fourth

== Players ==
As of 10 August 2018

Note: Flags indicate national team as defined under FIFA eligibility rules; some limited exceptions apply. Players may hold more than one non-FIFA nationality.

No.	Pos.	Nation	Player
1	GK	ENG	Marcus Bettinelli
3	MF	ENG	Ryan Sessegnon
4	DF	BEL	Denis Odoi
5	DF	ENG	Calum Chambers (on loan from Arsenal)
6	MF	SCO	Kevin McDonald
7	MF	COD	Neeskens Kebano
8	MF	NOR	Stefan Johansen
9	FW	SRB	Aleksandar Mitrović
10	MF	SCO	Tom Cairney (captain)
11	FW	TOG	Floyd Ayité
13	DF	USA	Tim Ream
14	FW	GER	André Schürrle (on loan from Borussia Dortmund)
19	FW	ARG	Luciano Vietto (on loan from Atlético Madrid)
20	DF	FRA	Maxime Le Marchand

No.	Pos.	Nation	Player
21	DF	NED	Timothy Fosu-Mensah (on loan from Manchester United)
22	DF	IRL	Cyrus Christie
23	DF	ENG	Joe Bryan
24	MF	CIV	Jean Michaël Seri
25	GK	ESP	Sergio Rico (on loan from Sevilla)
26	DF	ENG	Alfie Mawson
29	MF	CMR	André-Frank Zambo Anguissa
31	GK	ESP	Fabri
36	MF	USA	Luca de la Torre
43	DF	ENG	Steven Sessegnon
44	MF	GUI	Ibrahima Cissé
47	FW	MTN	Aboubakar Kamara
50	GK	ENG	Luca Ashby-Hammond

== Transfers ==
=== Transfers in ===
Date from	Position	Nationality	Name	From	Fee	Ref.
1 July 2018	CF	(Finland)	Terry Ablade	(Finland) Jazz	Undisclosed	
1 July 2018	GK	(Germany)	Toni Stahl	(Germany) RB Leipzig	Free transfer	
12 July 2018	LB	(France)	Maxime Le Marchand	(France) Nice	Undisclosed	
12 July 2018	CM	(Ivory Coast)	Jean Michaël Seri	(France) Nice	‌‌‌‌£18,000,000	
24 July 2018	GK	(Spain)	Fabri	(Turkey) Beşiktaş	Undisclosed	
30 July 2018	CF	(Serbia)	Aleksandar Mitrović	(England) Newcastle United	£22,000,000	
2 August 2018	CB	(England)	Alfie Mawson	(Wales) Swansea City	£15,000,000	
9 August 2018	LB	(England)	Joe Bryan	(England) Bristol City	£6,000,000	
9 August 2018	DM	(Cameroon)	André-Frank Zambo Anguissa	(France) Marseille	Undisclosed	
23 August 2018	CB	(Australia)	Riley Warland	(Australia) Perth Glory	Undisclosed	
15 January 2019	LW	(Netherlands)	Ryan Babel	(Turkey) Beşiktaş	Undisclosed	
1 February 2019	RW	(Serbia)	Lazar Marković	(England) Liverpool	Free transfer	
29 March 2019	CB	(England)	Luca Murphy	Hartlepool United	Undisclosed	

=== Loans in ===
Start date	Position	Nationality	Name	From	End date	Ref.
25 July 2018	LW	(Germany)	André Schürrle	(Germany) Borussia Dortmund	31 May 2020	
7 August 2018	CB	(England)	Calum Chambers	(England) Arsenal	31 May 2019	
9 August 2018	RB	(Netherlands)	Timothy Fosu-Mensah	(England) Manchester United	31 May 2019	
9 August 2018	GK	(Spain)	Sergio Rico	(Spain) Sevilla	31 May 2019	
9 August 2018	CF	(Argentina)	Luciano Vietto	(Spain) Atlético Madrid	31 May 2019	
31 January 2019	CB	(Norway)	Håvard Nordtveit	(Germany) 1899 Hoffenheim	31 May 2019	

André Schürrle's loan ended early when Fulham were relegated in 2019.

=== Transfers out ===
Date from	Position	Nationality	Name	To	Fee	Ref.
1 July 2018	RB	(England)	Joe Felix	(England) Queens Park Rangers	Released	
1 July 2018	CF	(England)	Michael Elstone	Released		
1 July 2018	RB	(England)	Ryan Fredericks	(England) West Ham United	Free transfer	
1 July 2018	LB	(England)	Daniel Martin	(Wales) Cardiff City	Released	
1 July 2018	RW	(England)	Isaac Pearce	(England) Forest Green Rovers	Free transfer	
1 July 2018	GK	(Australia)	Julian Schwarzer	(Germany) FC Pipinsried	Released	
1 July 2018	AM	(Wales)	George Williams	(England) Forest Green Rovers	Released	
1 July 2018	RB	(England)	Djed Spence	(England) Middlesbrough	Released	
1 July 2018	CM	(England)	Reece York	(England) Sheffield United	Free transfer	
16 July 2018	GK	(England)	David Button	(England) Brighton & Hove Albion	Undisclosed	
3 January 2019	CF	(England)	Cauley Woodrow	(England) Barnsley	Undisclosed	
19 January 2019	CF	(England)	Stephen Humphrys	(England) Southend United	Undisclosed	
15 February 2019	CM	(England)	Foday Nabay	(England) Nuneaton Borough	Free transfer	
22 February 2019	AM	(Iceland)	Atli Hrafn Andrason	(Iceland) Víkingur Reykjavík	Undisclosed	

=== Loans out ===
Start date	Position	Nationality	Name	To	End date	Ref.
6 July 2018	CF	(England)	Stephen Humphrys	(England) Scunthorpe United	3 January 2019	
7 July 2018	CF	(England)	Elijah Adebayo	(England) Swindon Town	9 January 2019	
25 July 2018	GK	(Slovakia)	Marek Rodák	(England) Rotherham United	31 May 2019	
3 August 2018	DM	(England)	Tayo Edun	(England) Ipswich Town	31 May 2019	
15 August 2018	CB	(Guinea-Bissau)	Marcelo Djaló	(Spain) Extremadura	31 May 2019	
15 August 2018	GK	(England)	Magnus Norman	(England) Rochdale	31 May 2019	
24 August 2018	CF	(England)	Cauley Woodrow	(England) Barnsley	3 January 2019	
31 August 2018	CF	(Portugal)	Rui Fonte	(France) Lille	31 May 2019	
31 August 2018	LM	(Iceland)	Jón Dagur Þorsteinsson	(Denmark) Vendsyssel	31 May 2019	
31 January 2019	CF	(England)	Elijah Adebayo	(England) Stevenage	31 May 2019	
31 January 2019	CF	(Mauritania)	Aboubakar Kamara	(Turkey) Yeni Malatyaspor	31 May 2019	
31 January 2019	CM	(Norway)	Stefan Johansen	(England) West Bromwich Albion	31 May 2019	

== Friendlies ==
Fulham confirmed friendlies against Crawley Town, Reading, Fenerbahçe, Lyon, Sampdoria and Celta de Vigo.

7 July 2018 Friendly	Fulham	4–2	Crawley Town	New Malden
12:30 BST	Käit 23'; Ayité 49'; Djaló 58'; Kebano 72'	Report	Palmer 9'; Verheydt 73'	Stadium: Motspur Park

14 July 2018 Friendly	Reading	0–0	Fulham	Aldershot
13:30 BST		Report		Stadium: The Recreation Ground

18 July 2018 Friendly	Fenerbahçe	3–0	Fulham	Thonon-les-Bains, France
21:00 BST	Giuliano 28'; Kaldırım 42'; Tufan 75'	Report		Stadium: Stade Joseph-Moynat; Referee: Benoît Millot (France)

21 July 2018 Friendly	Lyon	4–0	Fulham	Bourgoin-Jallieu, France
21:00 BST	Terrier 64', 84'; Mariano 74' (pen.); Cornet 78'	Report		Stadium: Stade Pierre Rajon; Referee: Willy Delajaud (France)

1 August 2018 Friendly	Fulham	0–1	Sampdoria	Aldershot
19:45 BST			Ramírez 80'	Stadium: The Recreation Ground; Referee: Graham Scott (England)

4 August 2018 Friendly	Fulham	2–2	Celta Vigo	Fulham
15:00 BST	Mitrović 2', 16'	Report	Eckert 6'; Cabral 41'	Stadium: Craven Cottage; Referee: David Coote (England)

8 September 2018 Friendly	Fulham	1–0	ATK	Murcia, Spain
12:00 CEST	Schürrle 72'	Report		Stadium: Pinatar Arena Football Centre

== Competitions ==
=== Premier League ===
==== League table ====
Pos	Team	Pld	W	D	L	GF	GA	GD	Pts	Qualification or relegation
16	Southampton	38	9	12	17	45	65	−20	39	
17	Brighton & Hove Albion	38	9	9	20	35	60	−25	36	
18	Cardiff City (R)	38	10	4	24	34	69	−35	34	Relegation to EFL Championship
19	Fulham (R)	38	7	5	26	34	81	−47	26	Relegation to EFL Championship
20	Huddersfield Town (R)	38	3	7	28	22	76	−54	16	Relegation to EFL Championship

Source: Premier League
Rules for classification: 1) Points; 2) Goal difference; 3) Goals scored; 4) Play-offs (only if needed to decide champion, teams for relegation or teams for UEFA competitions).
(R) Relegated

==== Results summary ====
Overall								Home						Away					
Pld	W	D	L	GF	GA	GD	Pts	W	D	L	GF	GA	GD	W	D	L	GF	GA	GD
38	7	5	26	34	81	−47	26	6	3	10	22	36	−14	1	2	16	12	45	−33

Last updated: 12 May 2019.

==== Results by matchday ====
Matchday	1	2	3	4	5	6	7	8	9	10	11	12	13	14	15	16	17	18	19	20	21	22	23	24	25	26	27	28	29	30	31	32	33	34	35	36	37	38
Ground	H	A	H	A	A	H	A	H	A	H	A	A	H	A	H	A	H	A	H	H	A	A	H	H	A	H	A	A	H	A	H	H	A	H	A	H	A	H
Result	L	L	W	D	L	D	L	L	L	L	L	L	W	L	D	L	L	D	D	W	L	L	L	W	L	L	L	L	L	L	L	L	L	W	W	W	L	L
Position	19	19	12	13	15	15	16	17	18	18	20	20	20	20	20	20	20	20	19	19	19	19	19	19	19	19	19	19	19	19	19	19	19	19	19	19	19	19

Updated to match(es) played on 12 May 2019. Source: Statto.com
A = Away; H = Home; W = Win; D = Draw; L = Loss

==== Matches ====
On 14 June 2018, the Premier League fixtures for the forthcoming season were announced.

11 August 2018 1	Fulham	0–2	Crystal Palace	Fulham
15:00 BST	McDonald (yellow card) 34'	Report	Schlupp 41', (yellow card) 74'; Zaha (yellow card) 40', (goal) 79'	Stadium: Craven Cottage; Attendance: 24,821; Referee: Mike Dean

18 August 2018 2	Tottenham Hotspur	3–1	Fulham	Wembley
15:00 BST	Lucas 43'; Trippier 74'; Kane 77'	Report	Mitrović 52'	Stadium: Wembley Stadium; Attendance: 58,297; Referee: Anthony Taylor

26 August 2018 3	Fulham	4–2	Burnley	Fulham
16:00 BST	Seri 4'; Mitrović 36', 38'; Schürrle (yellow card) 59', (goal) 83'; Bettinelli (yellow card) 90+1'	Report	Hendrick 10'; Tarkowski 41', (yellow card) 54'	Stadium: Craven Cottage; Attendance: 23,438; Referee: David Coote

1 September 2018 4	Brighton & Hove Albion	2–2	Fulham	Falmer
15:00 BST	Stephens (yellow card) 45'; Pröpper (yellow card) 52'; Murray (yellow card) 59', (goal) 67', 84' (pen.)	Report	Schürrle 43'; Mitrović 62', (yellow card) 84'; Johansen (yellow card) 82'; Le Marchand (yellow card) 90+4'	Stadium: Falmer Stadium; Attendance: 30,526; Referee: Lee Probert

15 September 2018 5	Manchester City	3–0	Fulham	Manchester
15:00 BST	Sané 2'; D. Silva 21'; Sterling 47'	Report		Stadium: City of Manchester Stadium; Attendance: 53,307; Referee: Stuart Attwell

22 September 2018 6	Fulham	1–1	Watford	Fulham
12:30 BST	Mawson (yellow card) 30'; Fosu-Mensah (yellow card) 32'; Mitrović 78'	Report	Gray 2'; Holebas (yellow card) 58'	Stadium: Craven Cottage; Attendance: 23,418; Referee: Martin Atkinson

29 September 2018 7	Everton	3–0	Fulham	Walton
15:00 BST	Sigurðsson 56', 89'; Tosun 66'	Report	Christie (yellow card) 29'; Odoi (yellow card) 51'; Mitrović (yellow card) 53'	Stadium: Goodison Park; Attendance: 38,788; Referee: Roger East

7 October 2018 8	Fulham	1–5	Arsenal	Fulham
12:00 BST	Schürrle 44', (yellow card) 70'; Vietto (yellow card) 57'	Report	Lacazette 29', 49'; Ramsey 67'; Aubameyang 79', 90+1'	Stadium: Craven Cottage; Attendance: 25,401; Referee: Paul Tierney

20 October 2018 9	Cardiff City	4–2	Fulham	Cardiff
15:00 BST	Murphy 15'; Reid 20'; Gunnarsson (yellow card) 33'; Paterson 65'; Morrison (yellow card) 68'; Bamba (yellow card) 78'; Harris 87'	Report	Schurrle 11'; Chambers (yellow card) 19'; Sessegnon 34'; McDonald (yellow card) 36'; Johansen (yellow card) 45+3'	Stadium: Cardiff City Stadium; Attendance: 29,681; Referee: Kevin Friend

27 October 2018 10	Fulham	0–3	Bournemouth	Fulham
15:00 BST	Kamara (yellow card) 17'; McDonald (yellow card) 51' (yellow-red card) 73'; Mitrović (yellow card) 88'	Report	Wilson 14' (pen.), 85'; Brooks 72'; Cook (yellow card) 74'	Stadium: Craven Cottage; Attendance: 25,071; Referee: Andre Marriner

5 November 2018 11	Huddersfield Town	1–0	Fulham	Huddersfield
20:00 GMT	Fosu-Mensah 29' (o.g.); Mbenza (yellow card) 89'	Report	Fosu-Mensah (yellow card) 34'; Mitrović (yellow card) 76'	Stadium: John Smith's Stadium; Attendance: 17,082; Referee: Anthony Taylor

11 November 2018 12	Liverpool	2–0	Fulham	Liverpool
12:00 GMT	Salah 41'; Shaqiri 53'; Gomez (yellow card) 77'	Report	Chambers (yellow card) 59'	Stadium: Anfield; Attendance: 53,128; Referee: Paul Tierney

24 November 2018 13	Fulham	3–2	Southampton	Fulham
15:00 BST	Mitrović 33', 63'; Schürrle 43'; Mawson (yellow card) 45+1'; Johansen (yellow card) 90+3'	Report	Armstrong 18', 53'; Hoedt (yellow card) 73'; Højbjerg (yellow card) 68'; Obafemi (yellow card) 90+3'	Stadium: Craven Cottage; Attendance: 24,603; Referee: Michael Oliver

2 December 2018 14	Chelsea	2–0	Fulham	Fulham
12:00 GMT	Pedro 4'; Azpilicueta (yellow card) 69'; Loftus-Cheek 82'; Morata (yellow card) 83'	Report	Odoi (yellow card) 54'	Stadium: Stamford Bridge; Referee: Craig Pawson

5 December 2019 15	Fulham	1–1	Leicester City	Fulham
19:45 GMT	Kamara 42'	Report	Maddison 74'	Stadium: Craven Cottage; Attendance: 22,881; Referee: David Coote

8 December 2018 16	Manchester United	4–1	Fulham	Manchester
15:00 GMT	Young 13'; Mata 28'; Lukaku 42'; Dalot (yellow card) 45+1'; Rashford 82'	Report	Zambo Anguissa (yellow card) 31' (yellow-red card) 68'; Kamara 67' (pen.); Seri (yellow card) 72'	Stadium: Old Trafford; Attendance: 74,523; Referee: Lee Probert

15 December 2018 17	Fulham	0–2	West Ham United	Fulham
17:30 GMT	Seri (yellow card) 41'; Johansen (yellow card) 90'	Report	Snodgrass 17'; Antonio 29'; Noble (yellow card) 39'	Stadium: Craven Cottage; Attendance: 24,081; Referee: Mike Dean

22 December 2018 18	Newcastle United	0–0	Fulham	Newcastle upon Tyne
15:00 GMT	Kenedy (yellow card) 89'	Report	Kamara (yellow card) 84'; Seri (yellow card) 87'	Stadium: St James' Park; Attendance: 51,237; Referee: Martin Atkinson

26 December 2018 19	Fulham	1–1	Wolverhampton Wanderers	Fulham
12:30 GMT	Chambers (yellow card) 44'; Christie (yellow card) 45'; Sessegnon 74'	Report	Saïss (yellow card) 44' (goal) 85'	Stadium: Craven Cottage; Attendance: 24,382; Referee: Andre Marriner

29 December 2018 20	Fulham	1–0	Huddersfield Town	Fulham
15:00 GMT	Seri (yellow card) 25'; Odoi (yellow card) 44'; Christie (yellow card) 64'; Kamara (penalty missed) 82'; Mitrović 90+1'	Report	Hogg (yellow card) 69'	Stadium: Craven Cottage; Attendance: 24,423; Referee: Kevin Friend

1 January 2019 21	Arsenal	4–1	Fulham	Holloway
15:00 GMT	Xhaka 25'; Lacazette 55'; Ramsey 79'; Aubameyang 83'	Report	Kamara 69'; Fosu-Mensah (yellow card) 77'	Stadium: Emirates Stadium; Attendance: 59,887; Referee: Graham Scott

12 January 2019 22	Burnley	2–1	Fulham	Burnley
15:00 GMT	Bryan 20' (o.g.); Odoi 23' (o.g.); Tarkowski (yellow card) 72'	Report	Schürrle 2'; Chambers (yellow card) 34'; Christie (yellow card) 65'	Stadium: Turf Moor; Attendance: 19,316; Referee: Martin Atkinson

20 January 2019 23	Fulham	1–2	Tottenham Hotspur	Fulham
16:00 GMT	Llorente 17' (o.g.); Mitrović (yellow card) 74'; Seri (yellow card) 75'	Report	Alli 52'; Sánchez (yellow card) 74'; Rose (yellow card) 79'; Winks 90+3'	Stadium: Craven Cottage; Referee: Craig Pawson

29 January 2019 24	Fulham	4–2	Brighton & Hove Albion	Fulham
19:45 GMT	Seri (yellow card) 36'; Chambers 47'; Mitrović 58', 74'; Vietto 79'; Babel (yellow card) 87'	Report	Murray 3', 17'; Stephens (yellow card) 26'; Duffy (yellow card) 36'; Dunk (yellow card) 75'	Stadium: Craven Cottage; Attendance: 22,008; Referee: Lee Probert

2 February 2019 25	Crystal Palace	2–0	Fulham	Selhurst
15:00 GMT	J. Ayew (yellow card) 6'; Milivojević 25' (pen.); Wan-Bissaka (yellow card) 76'; Schlupp 87'	Report	Le Marchand (yellow card) 27'; Odoi (yellow card) 45'; Babel (yellow card) 59'	Stadium: Selhurst Park; Attendance: 25,355; Referee: Michael Oliver

9 February 2019 26	Fulham	0–3	Manchester United	Fulham
12:30 GMT	Bryan (yellow card) 25'; Chambers (yellow card) 38'; Mitrović (yellow card) 90'	Report	Pogba 14', 65' (pen.); Martial 23'; Matić (yellow card) 43' de Gea (yellow card) 90'	Stadium: Craven Cottage; Attendance: 25,001; Referee: Paul Tierney

22 February 2019 27	West Ham United	3–1	Fulham	Stratford
19:45 GMT	Chicharito 29'; Diop 40'; Lanzini (yellow card) 83'; Antonio 90+1'	Report	Babel 3'; Bryan (yellow card) 45'	Stadium: London Stadium; Attendance: 59,950; Referee: Lee Mason

27 February 2019 28	Southampton	2–0	Fulham	Southampton
19:45 GMT	Romeu 23'; Ward-Prowse 41'	Report	McDonald (yellow card) 62'	Stadium: St Mary's Stadium; Attendance: 27,597; Referee: Anthony Taylor

3 March 2019 29	Fulham	1–2	Chelsea	Fulham
14:05 GMT	Chambers (yellow card) 22' (goal) 28'; McDonald (yellow card) 51'	Report	Higuaín 20'; Jorginho 31' (yellow card) 61'	Stadium: Craven Cottage; Attendance: 24,900; Referee: Graham Scott

9 March 2019 30	Leicester City	3–1	Fulham	Leicester
15:00 GMT	Tielemans 21'; Vardy 78', 86'	Report	Ayité 51'; Babel (yellow card) 55'; Bryan (yellow card) 60'	Stadium: King Power Stadium; Attendance: 32,017; Referee: David Coote

17 March 2019 31	Fulham	1–2	Liverpool	Fulham
14:15 GMT	Anguissa (yellow card) 65'; Babel 74'; Bryan (yellow card) 90+4'	Report	Mané 26'; Fabinho (yellow card) 39'; Milner 81' (pen.)	Stadium: Craven Cottage; Attendance: 25,043; Referee: Craig Pawson

30 March 2019 32	Fulham	0–2	Manchester City	Fulham
12:30 GMT	Christie (yellow card) 67'; Le Marchand (yellow card) 80'	Report	B. Silva 5'; Agüero 27'	Stadium: Craven Cottage; Attendance: 25,001; Referee: Kevin Friend

2 April 2019 33	Watford	4–1	Fulham	Watford
19:45 BST	Doucouré 23'; Mariappa (yellow card) 44'; Janmaat (yellow card) 47'; Hughes 63'; Deeney 69'; Femenía 75'; Holebas (yellow card) 90'	Report	Babel 33'; Chambers (yellow card) 66'; Christie (yellow card) 90+1'	Stadium: Vicarage Road; Attendance: 17,301; Referee: Roger East

13 April 2019 34	Fulham	2–0	Everton	Fulham
15:00 BST	Cairney 46'; Ream (yellow card) 48'; Le Marchand (yellow card) 57'; Babel 69'	Report	Richarlison (yellow card) 44'	Stadium: Craven Cottage; Attendance: 24,971; Referee: Lee Probert

20 April 2019 35	Bournemouth	0–1	Fulham	Bournemouth
15:00 BST	Cook (yellow card) 80'	Report	Mitrović 53' (pen.), (yellow card) 75'; Chambers (yellow card) 59'; Rico (yellow card) 90+1'	Stadium: Dean Court; Attendance: 10,511; Referee: David Coote

27 April 2019 36	Fulham	1–0	Cardiff City	Fulham
15:00 BST	Babel 79'	Report		Stadium: Craven Cottage; Attendance: 23,822; Referee: Chris Kavanagh

4 May 2019 37	Wolverhampton Wanderers	1–0	Fulham	Wolverhampton
15:00 BST	Jota (yellow card) 7'; Dendoncker 75'	Report	Chambers (yellow card) 22'; Le Marchand (yellow card) 32'; Christie (yellow card) 73'	Stadium: Molineux Stadium; Attendance: 30,456; Referee: Jonathan Moss

12 May 2019 38	Fulham	0–4	Newcastle United	Fulham
15:00 BST	Bryan (yellow card) 59'	Report	Shelvey 9'; Perez 11'; Schar 61'; Rondon 90'	Stadium: Craven Cottage; Attendance: 24,979; Referee: Kevin Friend

=== FA Cup ===
The third round draw was made live on BBC by Ruud Gullit and Paul Ince from Stamford Bridge on 3 December 2018.

6 January 2019 Third round	Fulham	1–2	Oldham Athletic	Fulham
14:00 GMT	Kebano (yellow card) 38'; Odoi 52' (yellow card) 62'; Sessegnon (yellow card) 76'; Mitrović (penalty missed) 84'	Report	Surridge 76' (pen.); Lyden (yellow card) 83'; Lang 88'	Stadium: Craven Cottage; Referee: Anthony Taylor

=== EFL Cup ===
The second round draw was made from the Stadium of Light on 16 August. The third round draw was made on 30 August 2018 by David Seaman and Joleon Lescott. The fourth round draw was made live on Quest by Rachel Yankey and Rachel Riley on 29 September.

28 August 2018 Second round	Fulham	2–0	Exeter City	Fulham
19:45 BST	Kamara 4', 48'	Report	Collins (yellow card) 23'; O'Shea (yellow card) 52'; Abrahams (yellow card) 65'	Stadium: Craven Cottage; Attendance: 9,333; Referee: Kevin Friend

25 September 2018 Third round	Millwall	1–3	Fulham	Bermondsey
19:45 BST	Elliott 61'	Report	Bryan 7' de la Torre 52'; Christie 68'	Stadium: The Den; Referee: Darren Bond

1 November 2018 Fourth round	Manchester City	2–0	Fulham	Manchester
19:45 GMT	Díaz 19', 65'; Kompany (yellow card) 80'	Report		Stadium: City of Manchester Stadium; Attendance: 35,271; Referee: Martin Atkinson

== Squad statistics ==
=== Appearances and goals ===
No.	Pos	Nat	Player	Total		Premier League		FA Cup		EFL Cup	
No.	Pos	Nat	Player	Apps	Goals	Apps	Goals	Apps	Goals	Apps	Goals
Goalkeepers
1	GK	(England) ENG	Marcus Bettinelli	8	0	7	0	1	0	0	0
25	GK	(Spain) ESP	Sergio Rico	33	0	30	0	0	0	3	0
31	GK	(Spain) ESP	Fabri	2	0	2	0	0	0	0	0
50	GK	(England) ENG	Luca Ashby-Hammond	0	0	0	0	0	0	0	0
Defenders
4	DF	(Belgium) BEL	Denis Odoi	34	1	29+2	0	1	1	1+1	0
5	DF	(England) ENG	Calum Chambers	32	2	29+2	2	0	0	1	0
13	DF	(United States) USA	Tim Ream	35	0	31+1	0	1	0	2	0
16	DF	(Norway) NOR	Håvard Nordtveit	5	0	4+1	0	0	0	0	0
20	DF	(France) FRA	Maxime Le Marchand	29	0	25+1	0	1	0	1+1	0
21	DF	(Netherlands) NED	Timothy Fosu-Mensah	13	0	10+2	0	0	0	1	0
22	DF	(Republic of Ireland) IRL	Cyrus Christie	31	1	19+9	0	0	0	2+1	1
23	DF	(England) ENG	Joe Bryan	29	1	27+1	0	0	0	1	1
26	DF	(England) ENG	Alfie Mawson	16	0	13+2	0	0	0	1	0
43	DF	(England) ENG	Steven Sessegnon	2	0	0	0	0	0	1+1	0
Midfielders
6	MF	(Scotland) SCO	Kevin McDonald	16	0	10+5	0	0	0	1	0
7	MF	(Democratic Republic of the Congo) COD	Neeskens Kebano	9	0	0+7	0	1	0	1	0
10	MF	(Scotland) SCO	Tom Cairney	33	1	24+7	1	1	0	1	0
24	MF	(Ivory Coast) CIV	Jean Michaël Seri	34	1	27+5	1	1	0	1	0
29	MF	(Cameroon) CMR	André-Frank Zambo Anguissa	25	0	16+6	0	0	0	3	0
30	MF	(Serbia) SRB	Lazar Marković	1	0	0+1	0	0	0	0	0
33	MF	(England) ENG	Matt O'Riley	1	0	0	0	0	0	0+1	0
36	MF	(United States) USA	Luca de la Torre	2	1	0	0	0	0	1+1	1
44	MF	(Guinea) GUI	Ibrahima Cissé	5	0	1+2	0	1	0	1	0
56	MF	(England) ENG	Harvey Elliott	3	0	0+2	0	0	0	0+1	0
Forwards
3	FW	(England) ENG	Ryan Sessegnon	36	2	24+9	2	0+1	0	2	0
9	FW	(Serbia) SRB	Aleksandar Mitrović	39	11	37	11	0+1	0	1	0
11	FW	(Togo) TOG	Floyd Ayité	19	1	3+13	1	1	0	1+1	0
12	FW	(Netherlands) NED	Ryan Babel	16	5	15+1	5	0	0	0	0
14	FW	(Germany) GER	André Schürrle	25	6	21+3	6	0	0	1	0
19	FW	(Argentina) ARG	Luciano Vietto	22	1	10+10	1	1	0	1	0
Out on Loan
8	MF	(Norway) NOR	Stefan Johansen	13	0	4+8	0	0	0	1	0
17	FW	(Portugal) POR	Rui Fonte	1	0	0	0	0	0	1	0
47	FW	(Mauritania) MTN	Aboubakar Kamara	15	5	5+8	3	0	0	2	2

Last updated: 11 May 2019
Source: Competitions

=== Top scorers ===
Includes all competitive matches. The list is sorted by squad number when total goals are equal.

Last updated 27 April 2019.

Rank	No.	Nationality	Player	Premier League	FA Cup	Carabao Cup	Total
1
1	9	(Serbia)	Aleksandar Mitrović	11	0	0	11
2
2	14	(Germany)	André Schürrle	6	0	0	6
3
3	12	(Netherlands)	Ryan Babel	5	0	0	5
3	47	(Mauritania)	Aboubakar Kamara	3	0	2	5
5
5	3	(England)	Ryan Sessegnon	2	0	0	2
5	5	(England)	Calum Chambers	2	0	0	2
7
7	4	(Belgium)	Denis Odoi	0	1	0	1
7	10	(Scotland)	Tom Cairney	1	0	0	1
7	11	(Togo)	Floyd Ayité	1	0	0	1
7	18	(Argentina)	Luciano Vietto	1	0	0	1
7	22	(Republic of Ireland)	Cyrus Christie	0	0	1	1
7	23	(England)	Joe Bryan	0	0	1	1
7	24	(Ivory Coast)	Jean Michaël Seri	1	0	0	1
7	36	(United States)	Luca de la Torre	0	0	1	1
Own goals				1	0	0	1
TOTALS				33	1	5	39
