= Stefan Johansen =

Norwegian footballer (born 1991)

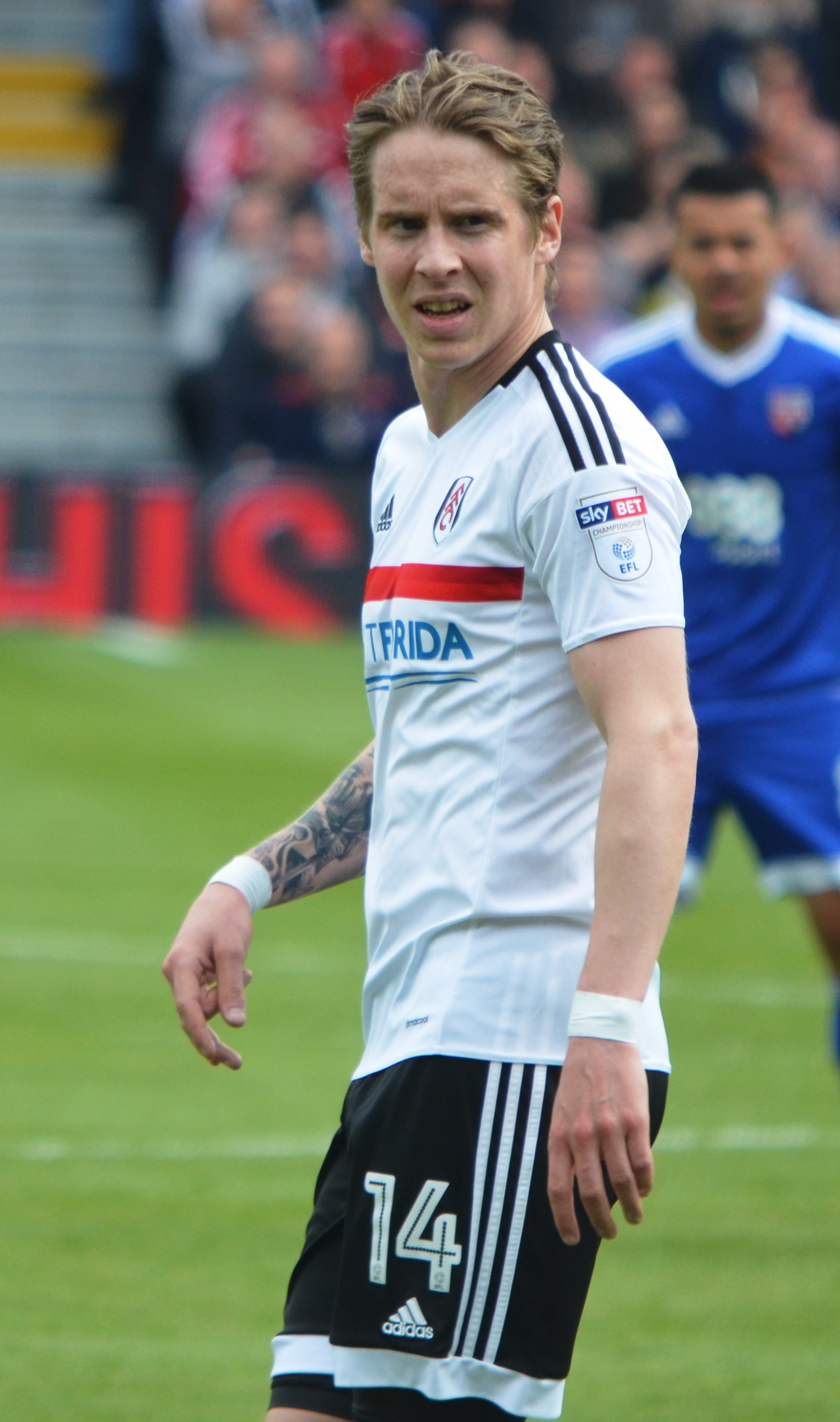
- Johansen playing for Fulham in 2017

Personal information
- Full name: Stefan Marius Johansen
- Date of birth: 8 January 1991 (age 35)
- Place of birth: Vardø, Norway
- Height: 1.82 m (6 ft 0 in)
- Position: Central midfielder

Youth career
- –2004: Vardø
- 2005–2006: Bodø/Glimt

Senior career*
Years	Team	Apps	(Gls)
2007–2010	Bodø/Glimt	29	(0)
2011–2014	Strømsgodset	67	(8)
2014–2016	Celtic	73	(12)
2016–2021	Fulham	126	(19)
2019	→ West Bromwich Albion (loan)	14	(2)
2021	→ Queens Park Rangers (loan)	21	(4)
2021–2023	Queens Park Rangers	64	(3)
2024	Sarpsborg 08	28	(6)
Total		418	(52)

International career^{‡}
2006–2007	Norway U16	8	(3)
2007–2008	Norway U17	10	(3)
2008–2009	Norway U18	5	(1)
2009–2010	Norway U19	8	(1)
2011–2013	Norway U21	5	(0)
2012	Norway U23	1	(0)
2013–2020	Norway	55	(6)
Medal record
Representing Norway
European Under-21 Championship
Bronze medal – third place	2013 Israel	U-21
- * Club domestic league appearances and goals as of 4 December 2024 ‡ National team caps and goals as of 7 September 2020

Stefan Marius Johansen (born 8 January 1991) is a former Norwegian professional footballer who played as a central midfielder. He played for the Norway national team until his international retirement in 2021.

Johansen joined Bodø/Glimt at the age of 14. He made his first-team debut in 2007, and transferred to Strømsgodset in 2011 where he was one of the key players in the team that finished second in the league in 2012 and won the league-title in 2013. Johansen won the Kniksen Award as the midfielder of the year in 2013. He transferred to Celtic in January 2014. At Celtic in 2015 he won their player of the year voted for by fans of the club.

Johansen has represented Norway at youth international level, and was a part of the under-21 team at the 2013 European Championship. He made his full international debut in 2013.

== Club career ==
=== Bodø/Glimt ===
Johansen was born and raised in Vardø, a small town in the far north of Norway. He moved to Bodø to sign for Bodø/Glimt at the age of 14. He joined the first-team squad along with Anders Ågnes Konradsen ahead of the 2007 season and Johansen made his debut for the team in the First Round of the 2007 Norwegian Football Cup against Hammerfest. Johansen played six matches in Adeccoligaen when Bodø/Glimt was promoted to Tippeligaen in 2007, and made his debut in Tippeligaen in the 3–2 win against Viking on 10 August 2008 when he replaced Jan Derek Sørensen in the 85th minute.

Johansen made four appearances in the 2009 season, going on to play regularly for Bodø/Glimt in Adeccoligaen in 2010 and was regarded as one of the biggest talents in Northern Norway. Clubs like Tromsø, Fredrikstad and Aalesund wanted to sign Johansen whose contract expired after the season, but he signed a three-year contract with Strømsgodset in December 2010, and joined the club on a free transfer on 1 January 2011. Johansen played 18 matches in Adeccoligaen in his final season at Bodø/Glimt.

=== Strømsgodset ===
Johansen made his debut for Strømsgodset against in the 2–1 against Sogndal when he came on in the 80th minute and replaced Fredrik Nordkvelle. In his first season at Strømsgodset, Johansen made 13 league appearances and scored one goal. In the match against Sandnes Ulf on 16 May 2012, Johansen scored a goal from a free kick. In the 5–0 win against Fredrikstad on 27 May 2012, Johansen scored another goal from a free kick, identical to the one he scored 11 days earlier. Johansen made his break-through at Strømsgodset after Mohammed Abu returned to Manchester City, when he became a regular in Strømsgodset's starting line-up and was in August 2012 awarded the Statoil Talent Prize for his performances. In 2013, Johansen helped Strømsgodset to win their first league title in 43 years and was voted the Midfielder of the Year in the Norwegian league.

=== Celtic ===
On 15 January 2014, Johansen sealed a move to Scottish Premiership club Celtic for a transfer fee of £2 million. Johansen signed a three-and-a-half-year contract with the club, and became the fourth Norwegian to play for Celtic following Harald Brattbakk, Vidar Riseth and Thomas Rogne. He was given the number 25 shirt, the same number worn in previous years by Ľubomír Moravčík and Shunsuke Nakamura.

Johansen made his debut for Celtic in the 4–0 victory against Hibernian on 26 January 2014 when he played the last five minutes as a substitute. He scored his first goal for Celtic on 22 March 2014 in a home league match against St Mirren, opening the scoring in a 3–0 win with a header.

=== Fulham ===
Johansen signed a three-year deal with Fulham on 26 August 2016 for an undisclosed fee. Johansen scored his first goal for the club in a 2–2 draw against Norwich City on 18 October 2016.

On 31 January 2019, Johansen joined West Brom on loan until the end of the season.

=== Queens Park Rangers ===
On 26 January 2021, Johansen joined Queens Park Rangers on loan until the end of the season. He scored his first goal for QPR in a 2-1 win over Bournemouth on 20 February 2021.

On 24 July 2021, following a successful loan spell, Johansen returned to Queens Park Rangers on a permanent deal, signing a three-year deal for an undisclosed fee.

On 19 June 2023, Johansen had his contract terminated by mutual consent.

== International career ==
Johansen made his debut for Norway when he played for the under-15 team against Poland U15 on 8 August 2006. He has later represented Norway at every level up to under-23, and played both matches for the under-21 team when they eliminated France U21 and qualified for the 2013 UEFA European Under-21 Football Championship. Johansen was part of the Norway side which beat England in the European Under-21 Championships before losing to eventual winners Spain at the semi-final stage.

Johansen has thirty-six full international caps for his country, scoring his first international goal on his debut against Sweden in Stockholm on 14 August 2014.

On 22 March 2017, Johansen was appointed as the new captain of Norway, replacing Per Ciljan Skjelbred. On 10 March 2021, Johansen announced that he would retire from international football immediately.

== Career statistics ==
=== Club ===
As of 10 November 2024

Appearances and goals by club, season and competition
Club	Season	League			Cup		Europe		Total	
Club	Season	Division	Apps	Goals	Apps	Goals	Apps	Goals	Apps	Goals
Bodø/Glimt	2007	Adeccoligaen	6	0	0	0	–		6	0
Bodø/Glimt	2008	Tippeligaen	1	0	1	0	–		2	0
Bodø/Glimt	2009	Tippeligaen	4	0	2	0	–		6	0
Bodø/Glimt	2010	Adeccoligaen	18	0	3	2	–		21	2
Bodø/Glimt	Total		29	0	6	2	–		35	2
Strømsgodset	2011	Tippeligaen	13	1	1	0	0	0	14	1
Strømsgodset	2012	Tippeligaen	27	3	5	1	–		32	4
Strømsgodset	2013	Tippeligaen	27	4	1	0	4	0	32	4
Strømsgodset	Total		67	8	7	1	4	0	78	9
Celtic	2013–14	Scottish Premiership	16	2	1	0	0	0	17	2
Celtic	2014–15	Scottish Premiership	34	9	8	1	14	3	56	13
Celtic	2015–16	Scottish Premiership	23	1	5	1	11	2	39	4
Celtic	2016–17	Scottish Premiership	0	0	0	0	1	0	1	0
Celtic	Total		73	12	14	2	26	5	113	19
Fulham	2016–17	Championship	36	11	4	2	–		40	13
Fulham	2017–18	Championship	44	8	1	0	–		45	8
Fulham	2018–19	Premier League	12	0	1	0	–		13	0
Fulham	2019–20	Championship	33	0	3	0	–		36	0
Fulham	2020–21	Premier League	0	0	2	0	–		2	0
Fulham	Total		125	19	11	2	–		136	21
West Bromwich (loan)	2018–19	Championship	14	2	0	0	–		14	2
Queens Park Rangers (loan)	2020–21	Championship	21	4	0	0	–		21	4
Queens Park Rangers	2021–22	Championship	35	1	2	0	–		37	1
Queens Park Rangers	2022–23	Championship	29	2	1	0	–		30	2
Queens Park Rangers	Total		85	7	3	0	–		88	7
Sarpsborg 08	2024	Eliteserien	26	6	3	0	–		29	6
Career total			418	52	44	7	30	5	492	64

=== International ===
As of match played on 10 October 2020

Appearances and goals by national team and year
National team	Year	Apps	Goals
Norway	2013	6	1
Norway	2014	9	0
Norway	2015	9	0
Norway	2016	9	2
Norway	2017	4	0
Norway	2018	9	2
Norway	2019	6	1
Norway	2020	3	0
Total		55	6

Scores and results list Norway's goal tally first, score column indicates score after each Johansen goal.

List of international goals scored by Stefan Johansen
No.	Date	Venue	Opponent	Score	Result	Competition
1	14 August 2013	Friends Arena, Solna, Sweden	Sweden	2–2	2–4	Friendly
2	29 March 2016	Ullevaal Stadion, Oslo, Norway	Finland	2–0	2–0	Friendly
3	1 June 2016	Ullevaal Stadion, Oslo, Norway	Iceland	1–0	3–2	Friendly
4	6 September 2018	Ullevaal Stadion, Oslo, Norway	Cyprus	1–0	2–0	2018–19 UEFA Nations League
5	6 September 2018	Ullevaal Stadion, Oslo, Norway	Cyprus	2–0	2–0	2018–19 UEFA Nations League
6	8 September 2019	Friends Arena, Solna, Sweden	Sweden	1–0	1–1	UEFA Euro 2020 qualification

== Honours ==
Strømsgodset

- Eliteserien: 2013

Celtic

- Scottish Premiership: 2013–14, 2014–15, 2015–16
- Scottish League Cup: 2014–15

Fulham

- EFL Championship play-offs: 2018, 2020

Individual

- Kniksen Award, Midfielder of the Year: 2013
- Gullballen: 2014
- PFA Scotland Players' Player of the Year: 2014–15
- Celtic Player of the Year: 2014–15
