= 2024–25 Al Jazira Club season =

Al Jazira
2024–25 season
- Manager: Hussein Ammouta
- Stadium: Mohammed bin Zayed Stadium
- UAE Pro League: 7th
- President's Cup: Semi-finals
- UAE League Cup: Winners
- Top goalscorer: League: Nabil Fekir (8); All: Nabil Fekir (9)
- All statistics correct as of 25 May 2025.

The 2024–25 season was Al Jazira Club's 51st since its founding and their 15th consecutive year in the UAE's top division. The team competed in the UAE Pro League, President's Cup, and UAE League Cup, the latter of which they won for the second time in club history.

== Transfers ==
=== In ===
Pos.	Player	Transferred from	Fee	Date	Source
MF	(Egypt) Mohamed Elneny	Unattached	Free	30 July 2024	
MF	(France) Nabil Fekir	(Spain) Real Betis	Undisclosed	30 August 2024	

== Competitions ==
=== Overall record ===
Competition	First match	Last match	Starting round	Final position	Record							
Competition	First match	Last match	Starting round	Final position	Pld	W	D	L	GF	GA	GD	Win %
UAE Pro League	24 August 2024		Matchday 1		26	10	7	9	45	40	+5	38.46
President's Cup					3	2	0	1	3	3	+0	66.67
League Cup	18 August 2024		First round	Winner	7	4	0	3	12	9	+3	57.14
Total					36	16	7	13	60	52	+8	44.44

Last updated: 5 October 2024
Source: Competitions

=== UAE Pro League ===
==== League table ====
Pos	Team	Pld	W	D	L	GF	GA	GD	Pts	Qualification or relegation
5	Al Ain	26	12	8	6	56	32	+24	44	Qualification for AGCFF Gulf Club Champions League group stage
6	Al Nasr	26	11	5	10	45	45	0	38	
7	Al Jazira	26	10	7	9	45	40	+5	37	
8	Khor Fakkan	26	9	6	11	41	52	−11	33	
9	Kalba	26	8	8	10	39	38	+1	32	

Source: UPLeague
Rules for classification: 1) points; 2) head-to-head goal difference; 3) head-to-head goals scored; 4) head-to-head away goals scored; 5) goal difference; 6) number of goals scored; 7) number of away goals scored; 8) head-to-head points; 9) fair play ranking 10) draw

==== Results summary ====
Overall								Home						Away					
Pld	W	D	L	GF	GA	GD	Pts	W	D	L	GF	GA	GD	W	D	L	GF	GA	GD
5	3	0	2	11	8	+3	9	2	0	0	5	1	+4	1	0	2	6	7	−1

Last updated: 5 October 2024.
Source: Worldfootball

==== Results by round ====
Round	1	2	3	4	5
Ground	A	H	A	H	A
Result	L	W	L	W	W
Position					

Updated to match(es) played on 5 October 2024. Source: Worldfootball
A = Away; H = Home; W = Win; D = Draw; L = Loss

==== Matches ====
The match schedule was released on 6 July.

24 August 2024 1	Bani Yas	2–0	Al Jazira	Abu Dhabi
18:00 UTC+4				Stadium: Baniyas Stadium

29 August 2024 2	Al Jazira	2–0	Al Orooba	Abu Dhabi
17:55 UTC+4				Stadium: Mohammed bin Zayed Stadium

21 September 2024 3	Sharjah	4–0	Al Jazira	Sharjah
17:30 UTC+4				Stadium: Khalid bin Mohammed Stadium

28 September 2024 4	Al Jazira	3–1	Al Nasr	Abu Dhabi
20:00 UTC+4				Stadium: Mohammed bin Zayed Stadium

5 October 2024 5	Dibba Al Hisn	1–6	Al Jazira	Khor Fakkan
17:10 UTC+4				Stadium: Saqr bin Mohammad al Qassimi Stadium

26 October 2024 6	Al Jazira	4–2	Khor Fakkan Club	Abu Dhabi
19:30 GST	Traoré 7'; Coulibaly 18'; Rabii 34'; Richard Akonnor (yellow card) 50'; Kebano 63' (pen.); Ali Khasif (yellow card) 77'	Report	Lourency 23' 79' (pen.); Abdullah Al-Karbi (yellow card) 38'; Mattheus Oliveira (yellow card) 88'	Stadium: Mohammed bin Zayed Stadium; Referee: (United Arab Emirates) Bader Bujamhoor

31 October 2024 7	Al Wasl	2–2	Al Jazira	Dubai
18:30 GST	Seferovic 12'; Fábio Lima (yellow card) 29'; Jonatas Santos 51'; Mijailović (yellow card) 55'	Report	Vinicius Mello 7' (red card) 90+6'; Khalifa Al Hammadi (yellow card) 41'; Miérez 82'	Stadium: Zabeel Stadium; Referee: (United Arab Emirates) Ahmad Salem Khalfan

23 November 2024 8	Al Jazira	4–0	Ajman	Abu Dhabi
18:30 GST	Traoré 27' 74'; Fekir 31'; Geusens 41'	Report	Azaro (yellow card) 79'; Abdelrahman Rakan (yellow card) 82'	Stadium: Mohammed bin Zayed Stadium; Referee: (United Arab Emirates) Hamad Ali Yousef

7 December 2024 9	Kalba	1–1	Al Jazira	Kalba
18:30 GST	Ghayedi 17'; Salem Rashid (yellow card) 18'; Mohammed Sabeel (yellow card) 41'; Blažič (yellow card) 80'; Sultan Al-Mantheri (yellow card) 90+4'; Khalid Al-Darmaki (yellow card) 90+7'	Report	Fekir (yellow card) 57' (goal) 90+5' (pen.); Khalifa Al Hammadi (yellow card) 86'	Stadium: Ittihad Kalba Stadium; Referee: (United Arab Emirates) Mohamed Abdalla Al Harmoodi

15 December 2024 10	Al Jazira	1–3	Al Ain	Abu Dhabi
18:30 GST	Fekir 52' (yellow card) 89'; Khalifa Al Hammadi (yellow card) 71'	Report	Kouame Autonne (yellow card) 50'; Laba 63' 69' 85'; Erik (yellow card) 65'; Park Yong-woo (yellow card) 83'; Rahimi (yellow card) 89'	Stadium: Mohammed bin Zayed Stadium; Referee: (Germany) Daniel Siebert

5 January 2025 11	Al Bataeh	0–3	Al Jazira	Al Bataeh
16:00 GST	Ahmed Sulaiman (yellow card) 37'; Rafael Pereira (yellow card) 57'	Report	Vinicius Mello 39'; Coulibaly 49'; Hamdan Abdulrahman (yellow card) 55'; Tagir 87'	Stadium: Al Bataeh Stadium; Referee: (United Arab Emirates) Yahya Almulla

11 January 2025 12	Al Jazira	0–0	Al Wahda	Abu Dhabi
18:45 GST	Miérez (yellow card) 30'; Coulibaly (yellow card) 55'; Ali Khasif (yellow card) 66'	Report	Bernardo Folha (yellow card) 85'; Alaeddine Zouhir (red card) 90'; Lucas Pimenta (yellow card) 90+6'	Stadium: Mohammed bin Zayed Stadium; Referee: (United Arab Emirates) Ahmad Salem Khalfan

=== President's Cup ===
19 October 2024 Round of 16	Al Jazira	1–0	Al Orooba	Abu Dhabi
17:05 GST	Bruno (yellow card) 45+4'; Richard Akonnor (yellow card) 53'; Traoré 84'	Report	Abdullah Yousef (yellow card) 13'; Salem Suleiman (yellow card) 40'; Mezenga (red card) 90'	Stadium: Mohammed bin Zayed Stadium

=== League Cup ===
==== First round ====
18 August 2024 First leg	Al Jazira	3–1	Al Bataeh	Abu Dhabi
18:05 UTC+4				Stadium: Mohammed bin Zayed Stadium

8 September 2024 Second leg	Al Bataeh	2–1 (3–4 agg.)	Al Jazira	Sharjah
17:45 UTC+4	Abang 84'; Neto 90+8'		Mierez 45+4' (pen.)	Stadium: Khalid bin Mohammed Stadium
