= 2022–23 UAE President's Cup =

Tournament details
- Country: United Arab Emirates
- Dates: 4 December 2022 – 28 April 2023
- Teams: 31 (Knockout round)

Final positions
- Champions: Sharjah (10th title)
- Runners-up: Al Ain

Tournament statistics
- Matches played: 32
- Goals scored: 100 (3.13 per match)
- Top goal scorer(s): (Tunisia) Firas Ben Larbi (Brazil) Diogo Acosta (4 goals)

The 2022–23 UAE President's Cup was the 46th edition of the UAE President's Cup.

Sharjah successfully defended their title from the previous year, after beating Al Ain in the final by a penalty shootout.

== Format ==
This season saw a new competition format where all clubs from both Pro League and First Division entered at the round of 32, with the exception of the defending champions Sharjah (who received a bye to the round of 16). The restructured schedule was a response to the previous season's competition being postponed due to a 2022 FIFA World Cup qualification play off match against Australia.

== Draw dates ==
Round	Draw date	Draw venue	Reference
Round of 32	8 November 2022	Museum of the Future, Dubai	
Semi-Finals	8 March 2023	Sharjah	

== Knockout round ==
=== Bracket ===
Round of 32
Emirates	5
Al Rams	0
Shabab Al Ahli	1
Al Wahda	0
Al Urooba	1
Khor Fakkan	3
Al Ain	4
Dibba Al Fujairah	0
Al Dhafra	3
Baynounah	0
Baniyas (a.e.t.)	2
Masfout	1
Fujairah (a.e.t.)	2
Hatta	1
Al Wasl	3
Masafi	0
Al Taawon	1
Al Hamriyah	2
Al Arabi	0
Ajman	3
Kalba	6
Al Dhaid	2
Al Bataeh	3
Al Jazirah Al Hamra	0
Sharjah
Bye
Al Nasr	5
Dubai City	0
Dibba Al Hisn	2
Al Jazira	3
Al Fursan	0
Al Khaleej	2

Round of 16
Emirates	0
Shabab Al Ahli	2
Khor Fakkan	0
Al Ain	1
Al Dhafra	1
Baniyas (a.e.t.)	3
Fujairah	1
Al Wasl	2
Al Hamriyah	0
Al Bataeh	2
Kalba	3 (5)
Al Bataeh (p)	3 (6)
Sharjah	2
Al Nasr	1
Al Jazira	6
Al Khaleej	1

Quarter-finals
Shabab Al Ahli	0
Al Ain	2
Baniyas	0
Al Wasl	2
Ajman	2
Al Bataeh	1
Sharjah	2
Al Jazira	1

Semi-finals
Al Ain	0	1	1
Al Wasl	0	0	0
Ajman	1	1	2
Sharjah (a.e.t.)	2	1	3

Final
Al Ain	1 (13)
Sharjah (p)	1 (14)

=== Round of 32 ===
All times are local (UTC+04:00)

4 December 2022	Emirates (2)	5–0	Al Rams (2)	Ras Al Khaimah
16:35	Acosta 15', 33', 44', 89'; Costa 54'	Report		Stadium: Emirates Club Stadium

4 December 2022	Dibba Al Hisn (2)	2–3	Al Jazira (1)	Dibba Al-Hisn
16:35	Henrique 57', 82'	Report	Mabkhout 3'; Traoré 13'; Bencharki 70'	Stadium: Dibba Stadium

5 December 2022	Al Nasr (1)	5–0	Dubai City (2)	Al Nasr, Dubai
16:40	Taarabt 1'; Carvalho 30'; Anwar 38', 41'; Jumaa 56'	Report		Stadium: Al Maktoum Stadium

5 December 2022	Al Bataeh (1)	3–0	Al Jazirah Al Hamra (2)	Sharjah
16:40	Campos 13'; Novais 84'; Abang 90+4'	Report		Stadium: Sharjah Stadium

5 December 2022	Fujairah (2)	2–1 (a.e.t.)	Hatta (2)	Fujairah
16:40	Adel 13'; Al Amin 117'	Report	Rogerinho 23'	Stadium: Fujairah Club Stadium

6 December 2022	Al Taawon (2)	1–2	Al Hamriyah (2)	Ras Al Khaimah
16:35	Razaq 43'	Report	Gabriel 3', 22'	Stadium: Emirates Club Stadium

6 December 2022	Al Fursan (2)	0–2	Al Khaleej (2)	Hatta
16:40		Report	Diop 64', 90+3'	Stadium: Hamdan Bin Rashid Stadium

6 December 2022	Al Dhafra (1)	3–0	Baynounah (2)	Madinat Zayed
16:50	te Vrede 44', 60'; Al Darmaki 77'	Report		Stadium: Al Dhafra Stadium

7 December 2022	Kalba (1)	6–2	Al Dhaid (2)	Kalba
16:35	Cicâldău 12'; Bessa 25', 61'; Mlapa 30'; Spadico 53'; Al Naqbi 81'	Report	Tamboura 44'; Alexsander 83'	Stadium: Ittihad Kalba Stadium

7 December 2022	Al Wasl (1)	3–0	Masafi (2)	Zabeel, Dubai
16:45	Gilberto 35'; Chancalay 61'; Saleh 90+4'	Report		Stadium: Zabeel Stadium

7 December 2022	Shabab Al Ahli (1)	1–0	Al Wahda (1)	Deira, Dubai
19:30	Abbas 70'	Report		Stadium: Rashid Stadium

8 December 2022	Baniyas (1)	2–1 (a.e.t.)	Masfout (2)	Al Shamkha, Abu Dhabi
16:45	Al-Hashemi 4'; Rabee 115'	Report	Ernest 27'	Stadium: Baniyas Stadium

8 December 2022	Al Ain (1)	4–0	Dibba Al Fujairah (1)	Al Ain
16:45	Kodjo Laba 45+2'; Canedo 75', 84'; Erik 87'	Report		Stadium: Hazza Bin Zayed Stadium

8 December 2022	Al Urooba (2)	1–3	Khor Fakkan (1)	Fujairah
19:30	Hassan 53'	Report	Tachtsidis 44'; Ayim 70'; Valmor 85'	Stadium: Fujairah Club Stadium

8 December 2022	Al Arabi (2)	0–3	Ajman (1)	Ras Al Khaimah
19:30		Report	Abdulrahman 49'; Larbi 52'; Abdelaziz 78'	Stadium: Emirates Club Stadium

=== Round of 16 ===
31 January 2023	Emirates (2)	0–2	Shabab Al Ahli (1)	Ras Al Khaimah
17:10		Report	Yuri 50'; Nourollahi 53'	Stadium: Emirates Club Stadium

31 January 2023	Al Dhafra (1)	1–3 (a.e.t.)	Baniyas (1)	Madinat Zayed
17:25	Leonço 55'	Report	Al-Noubi 73'; Giménez 102'; Suroor 116'	Stadium: Al Dhafra Stadium

31 January 2023	Sharjah (1)	2–1	Al Nasr (1)	Sharjah
20:30	Caio 57' (pen.); Pjanić 74' (pen.)	Report	Tozé 88' (pen.)	Stadium: Sharjah Stadium

31 January 2023	Al Hamriyah (2)	0–2	Ajman (1)	Al Hamriyah
20:30		Report	Azaro 45+4'; Ben Larbi 47'	Stadium: Al Hamriya Sports Club Stadium

1 February 2023	Khor Fakkan (1)	0–1	Al Ain (1)	Khor Fakkan
17:10		Report	Waleed 73'	Stadium: Saqr bin Mohammad al Qassimi Stadium

1 February 2023	Al Jazira (1)	6–1	Al Khaleej (2)	Al Nahyan, Abu Dhabi
17:20	Tănase 1', 60'; Traoré 35'; Bruno 75'; Bencharki 85'; Al-Ameri 90'	Report	Diop 45'	Stadium: Mohammed bin Zayed Stadium

1 February 2023	Fujairah (2)	1–2	Al Wasl (1)	Fujairah
20:30	Bouftini 27' (o.g.)	Report	Saleh 31'; Lima 45+3'	Stadium: Fujairah Club Stadium

1 February 2023	Kalba (1)	3–3 (5–6 p)	Al Bataeh (1)	Kalba
20:30	Spadacio 7'; Kiss 12' (pen.); Al Fardan 56'	Report	Abbas 6'; Jorge 41'; Lourency 90+6'	Stadium: Ittihad Kalba Stadium

=== Quarter finals ===
6 March 2023	Ajman (1)	2–1	Al Bataeh (1)	Ajman
17:30	Madan 33'; Larbi 45'	Report	Jorge 64'	Stadium: Ajman Stadium

6 March 2023	Shabab Al Ahli (1)	0–2	Al Ain (1)	Deira, Dubai
20:30		Report	Palacios 7'; Laba 80' (pen.)	Stadium: Rashid Stadium

7 March 2023	Baniyas (1)	0–2	Al Wasl (1)	Al Shamkha, Abu Dhabi
17:35		Report	Chancalay 36'; Gutiérrez 49'	Stadium: Baniyas Stadium

7 March 2023	Sharjah (1)	2–1	Al Jazira (1)	Sharjah
20:30	Luanzinho 45+4'; Lucas 90+2'	Report	Tănase 60'	Stadium: Sharjah Stadium

=== Semi-finals ===
==== First leg ====
5 April 2023	Al Wasl	0–0	Al Ain	Zabeel, Dubai
22:00		Report		Stadium: Zabeel Stadium

5 April 2023	Sharjah	2–1	Ajman	Sharjah
22:00	Alcácer 60'; Camara 62'	Report	Ben Larbi 70'	Stadium: Sharjah Stadium

==== Second leg ====
14 April 2023	Al Ain	1–0 (1–0 agg.)	Al Wasl	Al Ain
22:00	Erik 25'	Report		Stadium: Hazza bin Zayed Stadium

14 April 2023	Ajman	1–1 (a.e.t.) (2–3 agg.)	Sharjah	Ajman
22:00	Azaro 45+1'	Report	Djaniny 109'	Stadium: Ajman Stadium

=== Final ===
28 April 2023	Al Ain	1–1 (13–14 p)	Sharjah	Al Nahyan, Abu Dhabi
19:25	Laba 56'	Report	Abdulbasit 48'	Stadium: Mohammed bin Zayed Stadium; Referee: Clement Turpin (France)
	Penalties
	Yarmolenko (penalty scored); Erik (penalty scored); Laba (penalty scored); Palacios (penalty scored); Al-Ahbabi (penalty scored); Nader (penalty scored); Autonne (penalty scored); Barman (penalty scored); El Moubarik (penalty missed); Santos (penalty scored); Abo Sandah (penalty scored); Yarmolenko (penalty scored); Laba (penalty scored); Palacios (penalty missed)		(penalty scored) Caio; (penalty scored) Alcácer; (penalty scored) Luanzinho; (penalty scored) Ba Wazir; (penalty scored) Meloni; (penalty scored) Ibrahim; (penalty scored) Abdulrahman; (penalty scored) Rashid; (penalty missed) Manolas; (penalty scored) Suroor; (penalty scored) Al-Hosani; (penalty scored) Caio; (penalty scored) Alcácer; (penalty scored) Luanzinho

== Top scorers ==
As of 28 April 2023

Rank	Player	Club	Goals
1	(Brazil) Diogo Acosta	Emirates	4
1	(Tunisia) Firas Ben Larbi	Ajman	4
3	(Senegal) Mouhameth Diop	Al Khaleej	3
3	(Togo) Kodjo Laba	Al Ain	3
3	(Romania) Florin Tănase	Al Jazira	3
5	(Morocco) Walid Azaro	Ajman	2
5	(Brazil) Daniel Bessa	Kalba	2
5	(United Arab Emirates) Caio Canedo	Al Ain	2
5	(Brazil) Fernando Gabriel	Al Hamriyah	2
5	(Brazil) Paulo Henrique	Dibba Al Hisn	2
5	(Brazil) Artur Jorge	Al Bataeh	2
5	(United Arab Emirates) Ali Saleh	Al Wasl	2
5	(Mali) Oumar Traoré	Al Jazira	2
5	(Suriname) Mitchell te Vrede	Al Dhafra	2
