= 2021 FIFA Club World Cup squads =

Below is a list of the 2021 FIFA Club World Cup squads. Each team had to name a 23-man squad (three of whom had to be goalkeepers). Injury replacements were allowed until 24 hours before the team's first match.

== Al Ahly ==
Manager: (South Africa) Pitso Mosimane

Note: Flags indicate national team as defined under FIFA eligibility rules; some limited exceptions apply. Players may hold more than one non-FIFA nationality.

No.	Pos.	Nation	Player
5	DF	(Egypt) EGY	Ramy Rabia
6	DF	(Egypt) EGY	Yasser Ibrahim
8	MF	(Egypt) EGY	Hamdy Fathy
10	FW	(Egypt) EGY	Mohamed Sherif
11	MF	(Egypt) EGY	Walid Soliman
12	DF	(Egypt) EGY	Ayman Ashraf (captain)
14	MF	(Egypt) EGY	Hussein El Shahat
15	MF	(Mali) MLI	Aliou Dieng
16	GK	(Egypt) EGY	Ali Lotfi
17	MF	(Egypt) EGY	Amr El Solia
19	MF	(Egypt) EGY	Mohamed Magdy
20	DF	(Egypt) EGY	Mahmoud Wahid

No.	Pos.	Nation	Player
21	DF	(Tunisia) TUN	Ali Maâloul
24	DF	(Egypt) EGY	Mohamed Abdelmonem
27	DF	(Egypt) EGY	Taher Mohamed
28	DF	(Egypt) EGY	Karim Fouad
29	MF	(Mozambique) MOZ	Luís Miquissone
30	DF	(Egypt) EGY	Mohamed Hany
31	GK	(Egypt) EGY	Mostafa Shobeir
33	GK	(Egypt) EGY	Hamza Alaa
35	MF	(Egypt) EGY	Ahmed Abdel Kader
45	MF	(Egypt) EGY	Ziad Tarek
66	DF	(Egypt) EGY	Mohamed Maghrabi

== Al-Hilal ==
Manager: (Portugal) Leonardo Jardim

Note: Flags indicate national team as defined under FIFA eligibility rules; some limited exceptions apply. Players may hold more than one non-FIFA nationality.

No.	Pos.	Nation	Player
1	GK	(Saudi Arabia) KSA	Abdullah Al-Mayouf (captain)
2	DF	(Saudi Arabia) KSA	Mohammed Al-Breik
5	DF	(Saudi Arabia) KSA	Ali Al-Bulaihi
6	MF	(Colombia) COL	Gustavo Cuéllar
7	MF	(Saudi Arabia) KSA	Salman Al-Faraj
9	FW	(Nigeria) NGA	Odion Ighalo
11	FW	(Saudi Arabia) KSA	Saleh Al-Shehri
12	DF	(Saudi Arabia) KSA	Yasser Al-Shahrani
13	DF	(Saudi Arabia) KSA	Abdulrahman Al-Obaid
15	MF	(Brazil) BRA	Matheus Pereira
17	FW	(Mali) MLI	Moussa Marega
19	MF	(Peru) PER	André Carrillo

No.	Pos.	Nation	Player
20	DF	(South Korea) KOR	Jang Hyun-soo
21	GK	(Saudi Arabia) KSA	Mohammed Al-Owais
28	MF	(Saudi Arabia) KSA	Mohamed Kanno
29	MF	(Saudi Arabia) KSA	Salem Al-Dawsari
32	DF	(Saudi Arabia) KSA	Muteb Al-Mufarrij
33	GK	(Saudi Arabia) KSA	Abdullah Al-Jadaani
43	MF	(Saudi Arabia) KSA	Musab Al-Juwayr
66	DF	(Saudi Arabia) KSA	Saud Abdulhamid
70	DF	(Saudi Arabia) KSA	Mohammed Jahfali
88	DF	(Saudi Arabia) KSA	Hamad Al-Yami
96	FW	(Brazil) BRA	Michael

== Al-Jazira ==
Manager: (Netherlands) Marcel Keizer

Note: Flags indicate national team as defined under FIFA eligibility rules; some limited exceptions apply. Players may hold more than one non-FIFA nationality.

No.	Pos.	Nation	Player
1	GK	(United Arab Emirates) UAE	Abdulrahman Al Ameri
2	DF	(United Arab Emirates) UAE	Abdulla Idrees
4	DF	(Serbia) SRB	Miloš Kosanović
5	DF	(United Arab Emirates) UAE	Khalifa Al Hammadi
6	DF	(United Arab Emirates) UAE	Mohammed Al Attas
7	FW	(United Arab Emirates) UAE	Ali Mabkhout
8	MF	(Ivory Coast) CIV	Mamadou Coulibaly
9	FW	(United Arab Emirates) UAE	Zaid Al-Ameri
11	MF	(United Arab Emirates) UAE	Abdullah Ramadan
12	DF	(United Arab Emirates) UAE	Salem Rashid
15	DF	(Morocco) MAR	Mohammed Rabii
17	MF	(South Africa) RSA	Thulani Serero

No.	Pos.	Nation	Player
19	MF	(Mali) MLI	Oumar Traore
21	FW	(Mali) MLI	Abdoulay Diaby
22	MF	(United Arab Emirates) UAE	Mohammed Jamal
24	DF	(United Arab Emirates) UAE	Zayed Sultan
28	MF	(United Arab Emirates) UAE	Yousef Ayman
29	MF	(Brazil) BRA	Victor Sá
38	DF	(United Arab Emirates) UAE	Nawaf Dhawi
55	GK	(United Arab Emirates) UAE	Ali Khasif
56	GK	(United Arab Emirates) UAE	Rakan Al-Menhali
70	FW	(United Arab Emirates) UAE	Ahmed Al-Attas
80	MF	(Brazil) BRA	Bruno

== AS Pirae ==
Manager: (French Polynesia) Naea Bennett

Note: Flags indicate national team as defined under FIFA eligibility rules; some limited exceptions apply. Players may hold more than one non-FIFA nationality.

No.	Pos.	Nation	Player
1	GK	(French Polynesia) TAH	Jonathan Torohia
2	DF	(French Polynesia) TAH	Taumihau Tiatia
3	DF	(French Polynesia) TAH	Matatia Paama
4	DF	(French Polynesia) TAH	Haumau Tanetoa
6	MF	(French Polynesia) TAH	Tehatu Gitton
7	MF	(French Polynesia) TAH	Avearii Bennett
8	MF	(French Polynesia) TAH	Heirauarii Salem
9	FW	(France) FRA	Benoit Mathon
10	FW	(French Polynesia) TAH	Patrick Tepa
11	FW	(French Polynesia) TAH	Sandro Tau
12	MF	(French Polynesia) TAH	Nehemia Teriitahi
13	DF	(French Polynesia) TAH	Ariiura Labaste

No.	Pos.	Nation	Player
14	FW	(French Polynesia) TAH	Roonui Tinirauarii
16	GK	(French Polynesia) TAH	Teva Durot
17	MF	(French Polynesia) TAH	Sylvain Graglia
18	FW	(French Polynesia) TAH	Yohann Tihoni
19	MF	(French Polynesia) TAH	Heimano Bourebare
20	DF	(French Polynesia) TAH	Alvin Tehau
21	MF	(French Polynesia) TAH	Teimanaiterai Pater
22	FW	(French Polynesia) TAH	Jay Warren
23	GK	(French Polynesia) TAH	Steve Taero
26	FW	(French Polynesia) TAH	Axel Williams
30	DF	(French Polynesia) TAH	Jonathan Tehau

== Chelsea ==
Manager: (Germany) Thomas Tuchel

Note: Flags indicate national team as defined under FIFA eligibility rules; some limited exceptions apply. Players may hold more than one non-FIFA nationality.

No.	Pos.	Nation	Player
1	GK	(Spain) ESP	Kepa Arrizabalaga
2	DF	(Germany) GER	Antonio Rüdiger
3	DF	(Spain) ESP	Marcos Alonso
4	DF	(Denmark) DEN	Andreas Christensen
5	MF	(Italy) ITA	Jorginho
6	DF	(Brazil) BRA	Thiago Silva
7	MF	(France) FRA	N'Golo Kanté
8	MF	(Croatia) CRO	Mateo Kovačić
9	FW	(Belgium) BEL	Romelu Lukaku
10	FW	(United States) USA	Christian Pulisic
11	FW	(Germany) GER	Timo Werner
13	GK	(England) ENG	Marcus Bettinelli

No.	Pos.	Nation	Player
14	DF	(England) ENG	Trevoh Chalobah
16	GK	(Senegal) SEN	Édouard Mendy
17	MF	(Spain) ESP	Saúl
18	MF	(England) ENG	Ross Barkley
19	MF	(England) ENG	Mason Mount
20	FW	(England) ENG	Callum Hudson-Odoi
22	MF	(Morocco) MAR	Hakim Ziyech
23	MF	(Brazil) BRA	Kenedy
28	DF	(Spain) ESP	César Azpilicueta (captain)
29	MF	(Germany) GER	Kai Havertz
31	DF	(France) FRA	Malang Sarr

== Monterrey ==
Manager: (Mexico) Javier Aguirre

Note: Flags indicate national team as defined under FIFA eligibility rules; some limited exceptions apply. Players may hold more than one non-FIFA nationality.

No.	Pos.	Nation	Player
1	GK	(Argentina) ARG	Esteban Andrada
3	DF	(Mexico) MEX	César Montes
4	MF	(Mexico) MEX	Luis Romo
5	MF	(Argentina) ARG	Matías Kranevitter
6	DF	(Mexico) MEX	Edson Gutiérrez
7	FW	(Mexico) MEX	Rogelio Funes Mori
8	FW	(Costa Rica) CRC	Joel Campbell
9	FW	(Netherlands) NED	Vincent Janssen
11	MF	(Argentina) ARG	Maximiliano Meza
14	DF	(Mexico) MEX	Érick Aguirre
15	DF	(Mexico) MEX	Héctor Moreno
16	MF	(Paraguay) PAR	Celso Ortiz

No.	Pos.	Nation	Player
17	DF	(Mexico) MEX	Jesús Gallardo
19	FW	(Mexico) MEX	Alfonso Alvarado
20	DF	(Chile) CHI	Sebastián Vegas
21	MF	(Mexico) MEX	Alfonso González
22	GK	(Mexico) MEX	Luis Cárdenas
24	GK	(Mexico) MEX	César Ramos
27	DF	(Mexico) MEX	Daniel Parra
30	MF	(Mexico) MEX	Rodolfo Pizarro
33	DF	(Colombia) COL	Stefan Medina
43	DF	(Mexico) MEX	Alán Montes
49	FW	(Mexico) MEX	Kaleth Hernández

== Palmeiras ==
Manager: (Portugal) Abel Ferreira

Note: Flags indicate national team as defined under FIFA eligibility rules; some limited exceptions apply. Players may hold more than one non-FIFA nationality.

No.	Pos.	Nation	Player
2	DF	(Brazil) BRA	Marcos Rocha
4	DF	(Chile) CHI	Benjamín Kuscevic
6	DF	(Brazil) BRA	Jorge
7	FW	(Brazil) BRA	Dudu
8	MF	(Brazil) BRA	Zé Rafael
10	FW	(Brazil) BRA	Rony
11	FW	(Brazil) BRA	Wesley
12	DF	(Brazil) BRA	Mayke
13	DF	(Brazil) BRA	Luan
14	MF	(Brazil) BRA	Gustavo Scarpa
15	DF	(Paraguay) PAR	Gustavo Gómez
16	FW	(Brazil) BRA	Deyverson

No.	Pos.	Nation	Player
19	FW	(Brazil) BRA	Breno Lopes
20	MF	(Colombia) COL	Eduard Atuesta
21	GK	(Brazil) BRA	Weverton
22	DF	(Uruguay) URU	Joaquín Piquerez
23	MF	(Brazil) BRA	Raphael Veiga
26	DF	(Brazil) BRA	Murilo Cerqueira
28	MF	(Brazil) BRA	Danilo
29	FW	(Brazil) BRA	Rafael Navarro
30	MF	(Brazil) BRA	Jailson
31	GK	(Brazil) BRA	Mateus
42	GK	(Brazil) BRA	Marcelo Lomba
