= Neeskens Kebano =

DR Congo international footballer (born 1992)

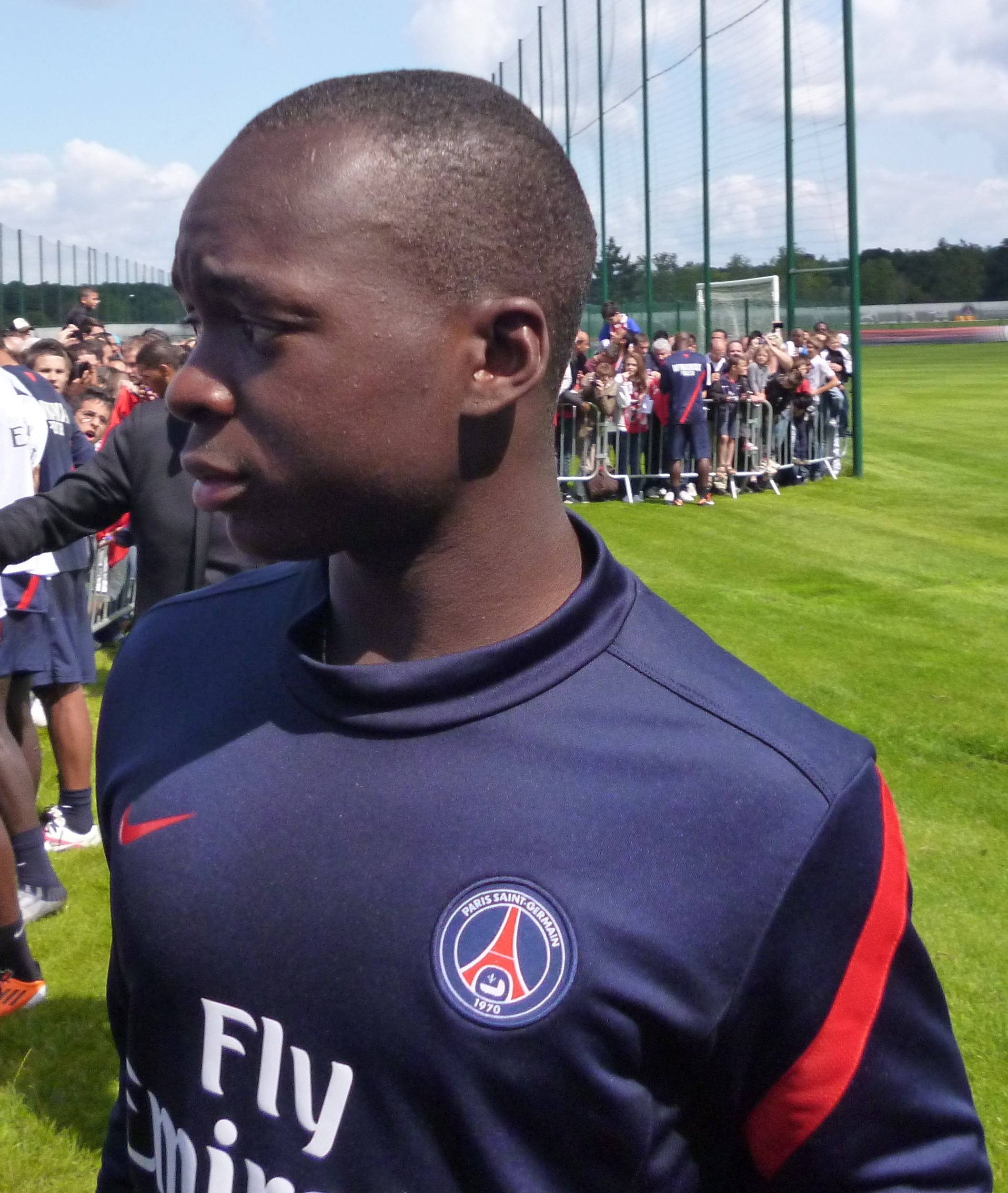
- Kebano with Paris Saint-Germain in 2011

Personal information
- Full name: Neeskens Kebano
- Date of birth: 10 March 1992 (age 34)
- Place of birth: Montereau, France
- Height: 1.72 m (5 ft 8 in)
- Positions: Attacking midfielder; left winger

Team information
- Current team: Al-Qadsia
- Number: 92

Youth career
- 1996–2006: ASA Montereau
- 2006–2011: Paris Saint-Germain

Senior career*
Years	Team	Apps	(Gls)
2011–2013	Paris Saint-Germain	3	(0)
2012–2013	→ Caen (loan)	12	(1)
2013–2015	Charleroi	64	(18)
2015–2016	Genk	37	(6)
2016–2023	Fulham	139	(21)
2021	→ Middlesbrough (loan)	18	(1)
2023–2025	Al-Jazira	44	(10)
2025–	Al-Qadsia	0	(0)

International career^{‡}
2008–2009	France U17	5	(1)
2009–2010	France U18	8	(2)
2010–2011	France U19	10	(1)
2011–2012	France U20	6	(0)
2014–2022	DR Congo	35	(6)
- * Club domestic league appearances and goals as of 20:21, 13 July 2025 (UTC) ‡ National team caps and goals as of 23 September 2022

Neeskens Kebano (born 10 March 1992) is a professional footballer who plays as an attacking midfielder or left winger for Al-Qadsia. Born in France, he represented the DR Congo national team.

== Club career ==
=== Early career ===
Kebano was born in the commune of Montereau-Fault-Yonne, Île-de-France. He was given his first name as an homage to the former Dutch international midfielder Johan Neeskens whom his father, Nestor Kebano, admired. Kebano was immersed into football at an early age and began his career playing for hometown club ASA Montereau. While at Montereau, he also competed in judo before opting to focus on football. In 2004, Kebano was among a host of players attempting to earn selection to the Clairefontaine academy. While at the academy's detection camp, he drew interest from Paris Saint-Germain scout Pierre Reynaud. The club contacted the player and offered him a trial at the club, which he accepted. After spending the 2005 season playing at Montereau, Kebano was contacted again by Paris Saint-Germain who brought him in for a second trial in December 2005. In the following January, the club signed him on an aspirant (youth) contract and he joined the club in July 2006.

=== Paris Saint-Germain ===
Kebano began his Paris Saint-Germain career at the club's youth academy in the Camp des Loges. He was placed on the club's under-14 team and formed friendships with youth and international teammates Jimmy Kamghain, Alassane Tambe, and Bastien Héry. The combination of the four were particularly instrumental in their youth team's success. With the under-14 team, Kebano won the Championnat Fédéraux de 14 ans. In the next season with the club's under-15 team, he played on the team that won the league and cup double. The team won its league, the Division d'Honneur, and also captured the Coupe de Paris. At under-16 level, Paris Saint-Germain and Kebano won the Championnat National des 16 ans. Though, he is still eligible to compete at youth level, ahead of the 2010–11 season, Kebano was promoted to the club's Championnat de France amateur team in the fourth division. He was also placed onto the club's squad for the UEFA Europa League being assigned the number 38 shirt by manager Antoine Kombouaré.

Kebano made his amateur debut on 8 August 2010 in a 1–0 victory over Bourg-Péronnas. The following week, he scored his first amateur goal in a 4–1 win over Monts d'Or Azergues. After rotating between the club's reserve and Coupe Gambardella teams in the fall campaign, in December 2011, Kebano was called up to the senior team for the first time to participate in the club's final Europa League group stage match against Ukrainian club Karpaty Lviv. He appeared on the substitute's bench, but failed to make his debut as Paris Saint-Germain and Karpaty drew 1–1. After the winter break, Kebano returned to the club's reserve team and spent January playing with the team. In February 2011, he was called back up to the senior team after being named to the 18-man roster to play amateur club Martigues in the Coupe de France. On 2 February, Kebano made his professional debut in the match appearing as a substitute for Mevlüt Erdinç in a 4–1 victory. He scored his first professional goal for the club on 2 March 2011 in a 2–0 win over Le Mans in the quarter-finals of the Coupe de France.

On 14 August 2012, Kebano was loaned to Ligue 2 side SM Caen. As the 2012–13 season ended, Kebano was released to Charleroi.

=== Fulham ===
On 26 August 2016, Kebano signed for Fulham on a three-year contract for an undisclosed fee, with a club option for an additional 12 months. He scored his first goal for Fulham in a 3–2 win against Wigan Athletic on 11 February 2017.

On 27 July 2020, in the first leg of the 2020 Championship play-offs semi-final against Cardiff City, Kebano scored directly from a free kick in his third consecutive match, becoming the first player to achieve this feat in the top four English divisions since Wayne Rooney.

==== Middlesbrough (loan) ====
On 1 February 2021, Kebano joined Championship side Middlesbrough on loan for the remainder of the 2020–21 season. Five days later, he made his debut for Boro, being included in the starting line-up for a 4–1 home league defeat by Brentford. On 13 February 2021, he scored his first goal for Middlesbrough in a 2–1 away defeat by Derby County.

=== Al Jazira ===
On 8 July 2023, Abu Dhabi based club Al Jazira announced the signing of Kebano, following the expiry of his contract with Fulham at the end of the previous month.

== International career ==
Kebano is now a DR Congo international player. His first game was against Ivory Coast in Abidjan on 15 October 2014. His team won 3–4 and he scored the very first goal of the game after 23 minutes. In the past he was a French youth international having earned caps at under-17, under-18 level, and under-19 level. With the under-17 team, he went unnoticed by coach Philippe Bergeroo until the Elite Round of qualification for the 2009 UEFA European Under-17 Championship when he was finally called up to the team. Kebano made his youth international debut on 24 March 2009 in the team's first Elite Round group stage match against Belarus. He appeared in the team's next group stage match against Norway and, after France qualified for the competition, was named to the team to participate in the 2009 UEFA European Under-17 Championship. Kebano appeared in all three group stage matches as France were eliminated without procuring a victory. In the team's final group stage match against Italy, Kebano scored the opening goal in a 2–1 defeat.

With the under-18 team, Kebano made his debut on 27 October 2009 in a friendly match against Denmark. He scored his first goal for the team on 10 December in a 1–1 draw with Ukraine. At the 2010 edition of the Copa del Atlantico on the Canary Islands, Kebano scored the second goal in a 4–2 rout of Spain. He finished the under-18 campaign with eight appearances and two goals. Kebano was called up to the under-19 team in August 2010 to play in the Sendai Cup in Japan. He appeared in all three matches as France finished in third place. In October 2010, he played in qualification matches for the 2011 UEFA European Under-19 Championship. On 10 October, in the team's second group stage match against Montenegro, Kebano scored the opening goal in a 2–0 victory.

Born in France to Congolese parents, Kebano was named to the preliminary squad of the DR Congo national team in August 2014 by head coach Florent Ibenge for the opening two matches of the 2015 Africa Cup of Nations qualification campaign against Cameroon and Sierra Leone. Kebano subsequently announced his decision to represent the DR Congo at international level, ending his association with the French national youth teams. He made his senior international debut one month later in a match against Ivory Coast. The DR Congo won the match 4–3, with Kebano scoring one of the team's goals.

Kebano was included in the 23-man squad for the 2015 Africa Cup of Nations. However, a knee injury ruled him out of the opening matches of the tournament. He made his first appearance in the quarter-finals, coming on in the 67th minute with DR Congo trailing the Republic of the Congo 2–1. He provided two assists, one from a free kick for Joël Kimwaki and another for Dieumerci Mbokani, as DR Congo came from behind to win 4–2 and advance to its first Africa Cup of Nations semi-final since 1998.

Kebano was selected by Florent Ibenge for the 2017 Africa Cup of Nations. He scored his first Africa Cup of Nations goal against Ivory Coast.

== Career statistics ==
=== Club ===
As of match played 25 May 2025

Appearances and goals by club, season and competition
Club	Season	League			National cup (Note: Includes Coupe de France, Belgian Cup, FA Cup, UAE President's Cup)		League cup (Note: Includes Coupe de la Ligue, EFL Cup, UAE League Cup)		Continental		Other		Total	
Club	Season	Division	Apps	Goals	Apps	Goals	Apps	Goals	Apps	Goals	Apps	Goals	Apps	Goals
Paris Saint-Germain	2010–11	Ligue 1	3	0	2	1	0	0	2 (Note: Appearances in UEFA Europa League)	0	0	0	7	1
Paris Saint-Germain	2011–12	Ligue 1	0	0	0	0	0	0	2	0	–		2	0
Paris Saint-Germain	Total		3	0	2	1	0	0	4	0	0	0	9	1
Caen	2012–13	Ligue 2	12	1	2	1	2	0	–		–		16	2
Charleroi	2013–14	Belgian Pro League	26	5	1	1	–		–		–		27	6
Charleroi	2014–15	Belgian Pro League	33	12	3	1	–		–		–		36	13
Charleroi	2015–16	Belgian Pro League	5	1	0	0	–		4	3	–		9	4
Charleroi	Total		64	18	4	2	–		4	3	–		72	23
Genk	2015–16	Belgian Pro League	34	6	5	2	–		0	0	–		39	8
Genk	2016–17	Belgian Pro League	3	0	0	0	–		4	1	–		7	1
Genk	Total		37	6	5	2	–		4	1	–		46	9
Fulham	2016–17	Championship	28	6	1	0	1	0	–		2 (Note: Appearance(s) in Championship play-offs)	0	32	6
Fulham	2017–18	Championship	26	3	1	0	1	0	–		1	0	29	3
Fulham	2018–19	Premier League	7	0	1	0	1	0	–		–		9	0
Fulham	2019–20	Championship	16	3	0	0	0	0	–		3	2	19	5
Fulham	2020–21	Premier League	5	0	2	1	3	0	—		—		10	1
Fulham	2021–22	Championship	40	9	2	0	2	0	—		—		44	9
Fulham	2022–23	Premier League	17	0	0	0	0	0	—		—		17	0
Fulham	Total		139	21	7	1	8	0	–		6	2	160	24
Middlesbrough (loan)	2020–21	Championship	18	1	0	0	0	0	–		–		18	1
Al Jazira	2023–24	UAE Pro League	26	6	2	0	2	0	–		–		30	6
Al Jazira	2024–25	UAE Pro League	18	4	3	0	7	2	–		–		28	6
Al Jazira	Total		44	10	5	0	9	2	–		–		58	12
Career total			317	57	25	7	19	2	12	4	6	2	379	72

=== International ===
Scores and results list DR Congo's goal tally first

List of international goals scored by Neeskens Kebano
No.	Date	Venue	Opponent	Score	Result	Competition
1	15 October 2014	Stade Félix Houphouët-Boigny, Abidjan, Ivory Coast	Ivory Coast	1–0	4–3	2015 Africa Cup of Nations qualification
2	4 September 2016	Stade des Martyrs, Kinshasa, DR Congo	Central African Republic	1–0	4–1	2017 Africa Cup of Nations qualification
3	13 November 2016	Stade du 28 Septembre, Conakry, Guinea	Guinea	1–1	2–1	2018 FIFA World Cup qualification
4	20 January 2017	Stade d'Oyem, Oyem, Gabon	Ivory Coast	1–0	2–2	2017 Africa Cup of Nations
5	11 November 2017	Stade des Martyrs, Kinshasa, DR Congo	Guinea	3–1	3–1	2018 FIFA World Cup qualification
6	17 November 2020	Estádio 11 de Novembro, Luanda, Angola	Angola	1–0	1–0	2021 Africa Cup of Nations qualification

== Honours ==
Fulham

- EFL Championship: 2021–22; play-offs: 2020

Al-Jazira

- UAE League Cup: 2024–25

Individual

- Ebony Shoe: 2015
