= Mohammed Rabii =

Mohammed Rabii may refer to:

- Mohammed Rabii (boxer)
- Mohammed Rabii (footballer)
