= Mohamed Al-Junaibi =

Emirati footballer (born 1998)

Mohamed Al-Junaibi محمد الجنيبي
Personal information
- Full name: Mohamed Ismael Ali Al-Junaibi
- Date of birth: 29 May 1998 (age 28)
- Place of birth: Emirates
- Height: 1.65 m (5 ft 5 in)
- Position: Winger

Youth career
- –2019: Al Wahda

Senior career*
Years	Team	Apps	(Gls)
2019–2020	Al Wahda	1	(0)
2020–2023	Al Dhafra	55	(4)
2023–2024	Khor Fakkan	20	(1)
2024–2025	Al Urooba	16	(1)
2025–2026	Ajman	14	(0)
- * Club domestic league appearances and goals as of 22:22, 20 December 2022 (UTC)~

Mohamed Al-Junaibi (Arabic:محمد الجنيبي) (born 29 May 1998) is an Emirati professional footballer who plays as a winger.

== Career ==
=== Al-Wahda ===
Al-Junaibi started his career at Al-Wahda and is a product of the Al-Wahda's youth system. On 29 April 2019, Al-Junaibi made his professional debut for Al-Wahda against Al-Fujairah in the Pro League, replacing Tahnoon Al-Zaabi .

=== Al Dhafra ===
On 11 July 2020 left Al-Wahda and signed with Al-Dhafra.
