= Masoud Hassan =

Emirati footballer (born 1987)

Personal information
- Full name: Masoud Hassan Ali Saad
- Date of birth: 20 July 1987 (age 39)
- Place of birth: United Arab Emirates
- Height: 1.87 m (6 ft 1 1/2 in)
- Position: Right-back

Youth career
- Al-Nasr

Senior career*
Years	Team	Apps	(Gls)
2008–2013	Al-Nasr		
2013–2014	Emirates Club		
2014–2015	Ajman		
2015–2016	Al-Shaab		
2016–2017	Al-Fujairah		
2017–2018	Al Urooba		
2018–2019	Khor Fakkan		
2019–2020	Emirates Club		
- * Club domestic league appearances and goals

Masoud Hassan (Arabic:مسعود حسن) (born 20 July 1987) is an Emirati footballer. He currently plays as right back.
