= Fábio Carvalho (footballer, born 2002) =

Portuguese footballer

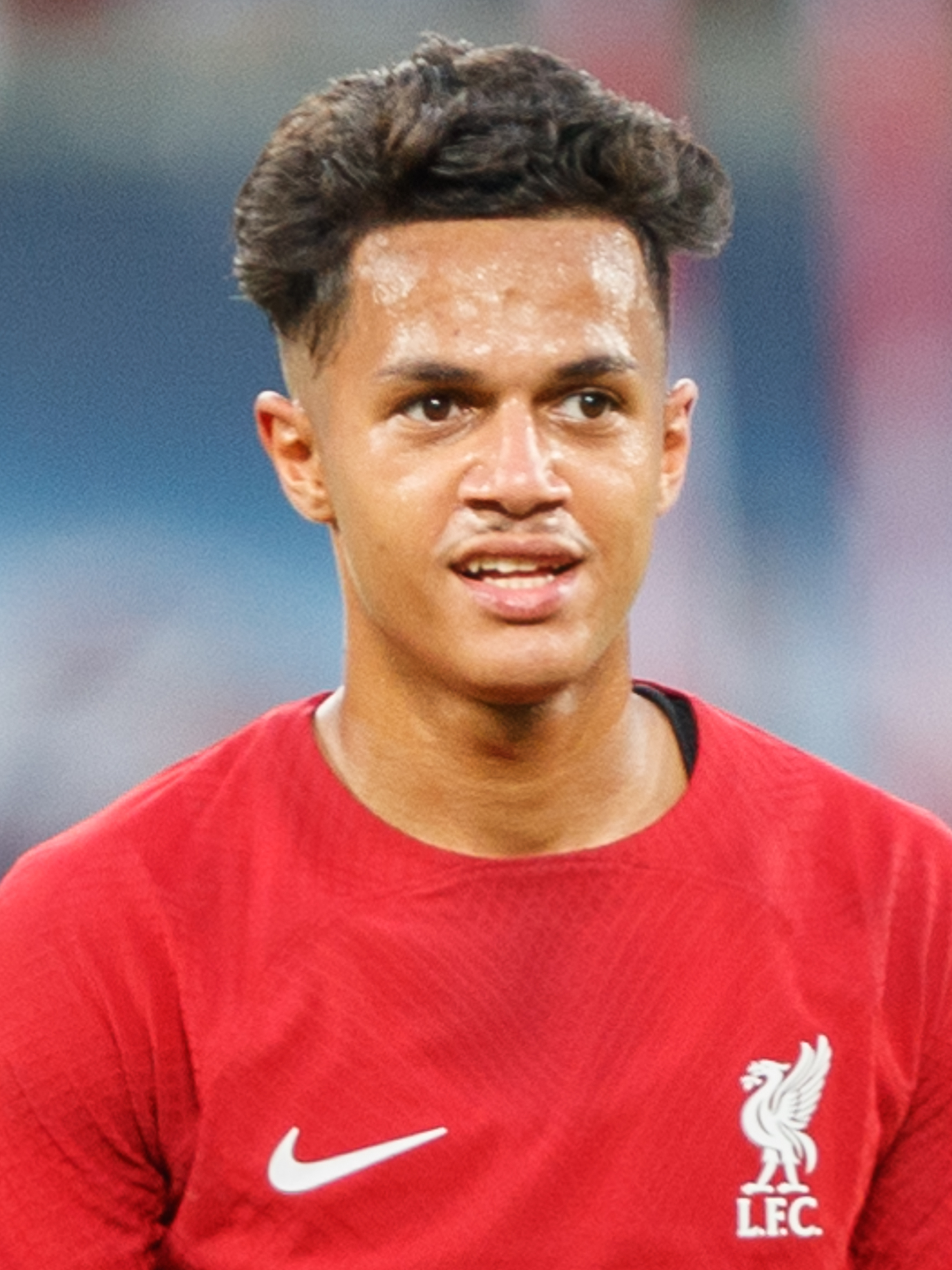
- Carvalho with Liverpool in 2022

Personal information
- Full name: Fábio Leandro Freitas Gouveia Carvalho
- Date of birth: 30 August 2002 (age 24)
- Place of birth: Torres Vedras, Portugal
- Height: 1.70 m (5 ft 7 in)
- Positions: Left winger; attacking midfielder

Team information
- Current team: Brentford
- Number: 14

Youth career
- 2009–2010: Olivais Sul
- 2010–2013: Benfica
- 2013–2015: Balham
- 2015–2020: Fulham

Senior career*
Years	Team	Apps	(Gls)
2020–2022	Fulham	40	(11)
2022–2024	Liverpool	13	(2)
2023	→ RB Leipzig (loan)	9	(0)
2024	→ Hull City (loan)	20	(9)
2024–	Brentford	26	(4)

International career
2017–2018	England U16	10	(2)
2018–2019	England U17	6	(1)
2019–2020	England U18	6	(0)
2022–2023	Portugal U21	4	(2)
- * Club domestic league appearances and goals as of 23:08, 18 September 2026 (UTC)

Fábio Leandro Freitas Gouveia Carvalho (born 30 August 2002) is a Portuguese professional footballer who plays as a left winger or attacking midfielder for Premier League club Brentford. A former youth international for England, Carvalho represented Portugal internationally at under-21 level.

== Early life ==
Carvalho was born in Torres Vedras, in the Lisbon District of Portugal and grew up in Zona J, Chelas. His father is Angolan and his mother is from Madeira, Portugal. He has an older brother and a younger sister. He played in the youth academy of Olivais Sul and Benfica. At the age of 11, he moved with his family to South London, where he was educated at Coombe Boys' School in New Malden. He played for Balham before being signed by Fulham in 2015. He is fluent in both Portuguese and English.

== Club career ==
=== Fulham ===
In May 2020, Carvalho signed his first professional contract with Fulham, for two years. On 23 September, Carvalho made his first-team debut as a substitute in a 2–0 EFL Cup victory over Sheffield Wednesday. On 15 May 2021, Carvalho scored his first goal in a 3–1 away league defeat to Southampton.

Carvalho had an impressive start to the 2021–22 season, scoring three goals in his first five matches as Fulham looked to return to the Premier League. As a result, Carvalho was awarded the EFL Young Player of the Month for August 2021.

=== Liverpool ===
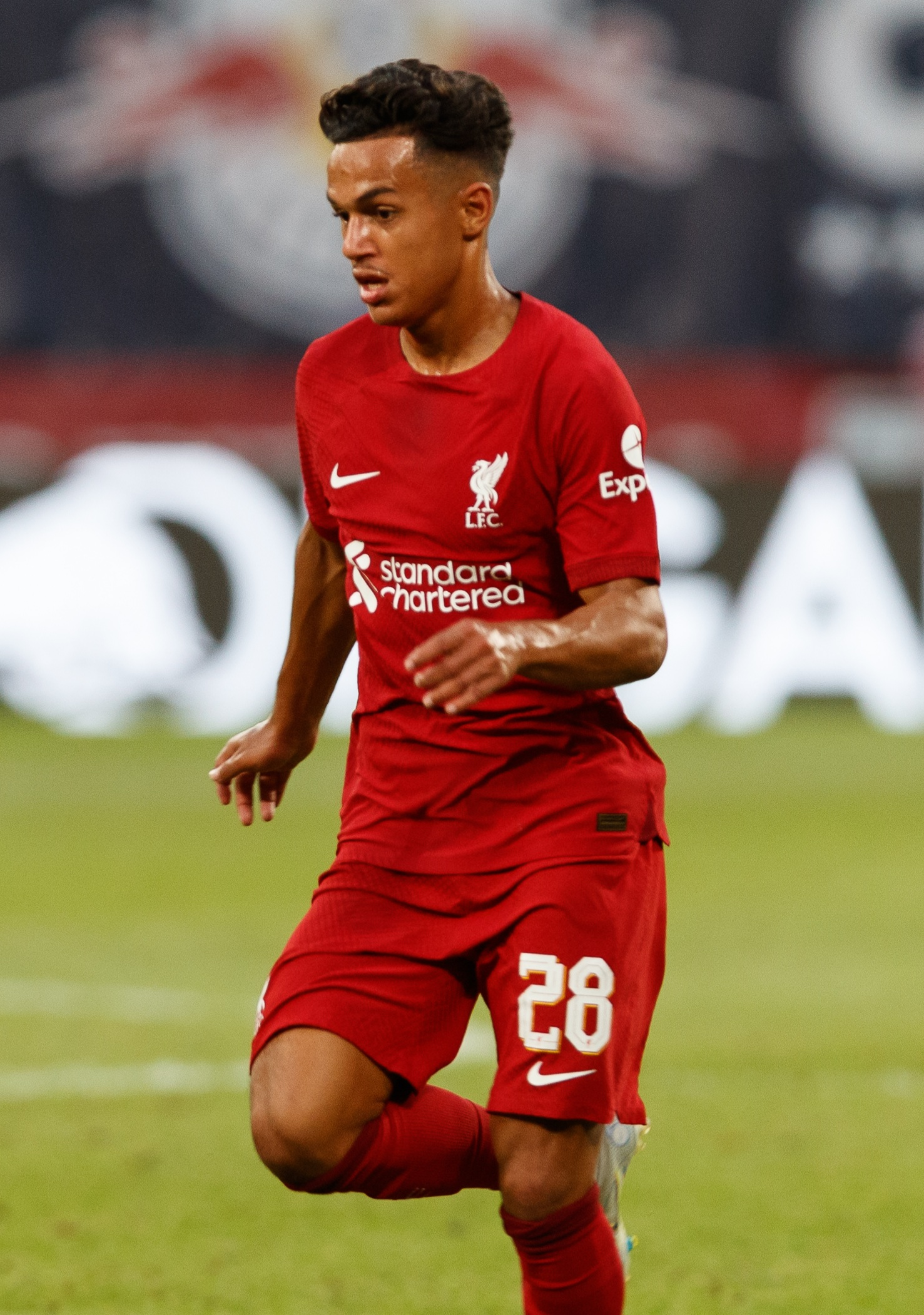
Carvalho playing for Liverpool in a pre-season game before the 2022–2023 season

Carvalho agreed to sign for Premier League club Liverpool in May 2022 for a reported fee of £5 million, potentially rising to £7.7 million with add-ons. The transfer became official on 1 July and Carvalho was officially unveiled two days later. He scored his first goal for the club on 27 August in a 9–0 home win over AFC Bournemouth in the Premier League. Four days later, on 31 August, he scored a crucial 98th minute match-winning goal during a 2–1 victory against Newcastle United at Anfield.

==== Loan to RB Leipzig ====
On 30 June 2023, Carvalho joined Bundesliga club RB Leipzig on a season-long loan.

On 12 August 2023, Carvalho made his debut for Leipzig in the DFL-Supercup match against Bayern Munich, coming on as a substitute for Dani Olmo in the 78th minute. His side won the match 3–0, giving Carvalho his first piece of silverware with the club.

Carvalho's loan was ended early on 31 December 2023 and he returned to Liverpool.

==== Loan to Hull City ====
On 10 January 2024, Carvalho joined EFL Championship club Hull City on loan until the end of the season. He made his debut on 12 January, in a 2–1 home loss to Norwich City. He scored his first goal for Hull in a 1–0 away win over Sunderland on 19 January. A strong end to the season, scoring five goals in seven appearances, saw Carvalho become just the third player to win the EFL Young Player of the Month award on a second occasion.

=== Brentford ===
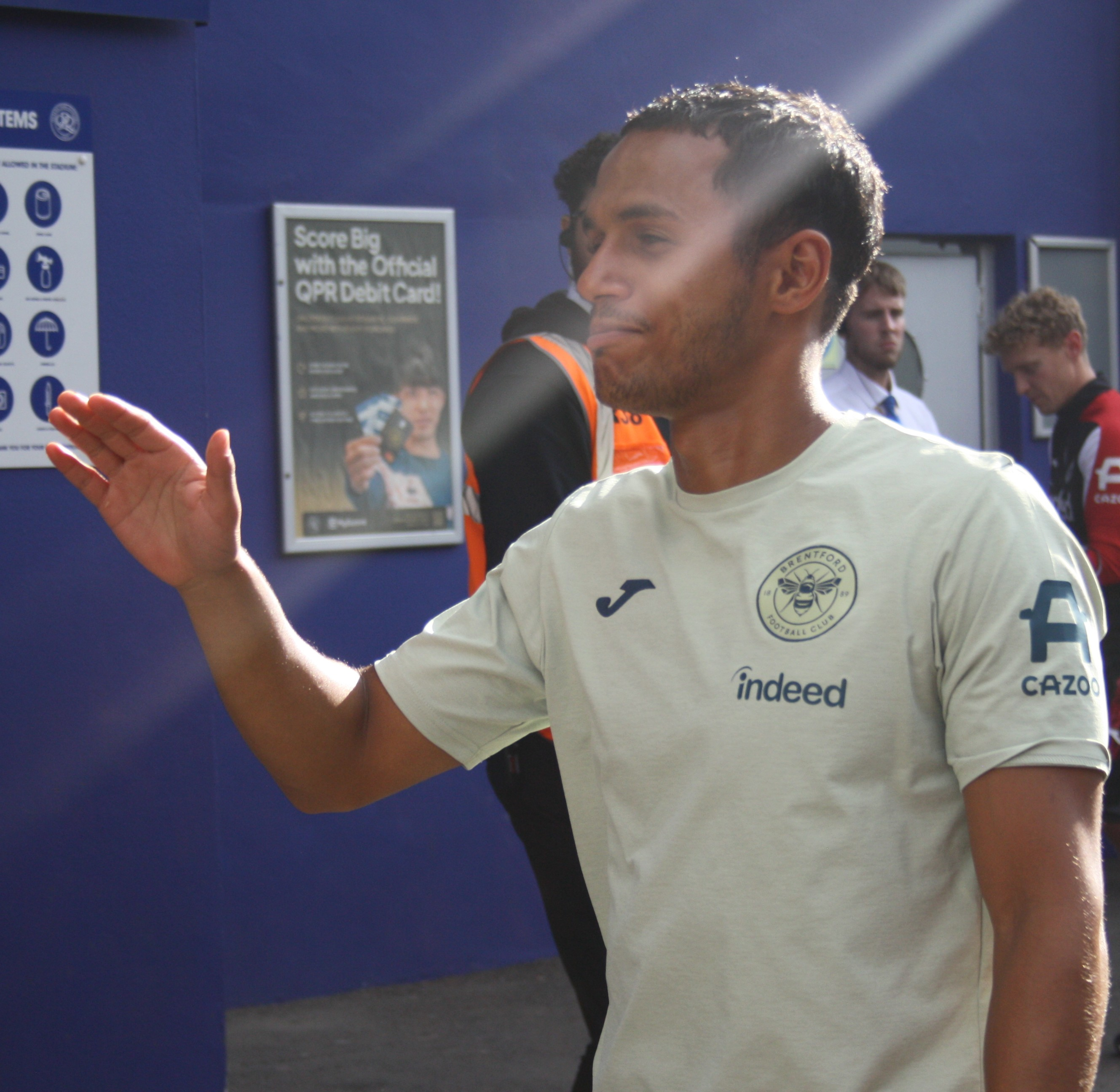
Carvalho with Brentford in 2025

On 12 August 2024, Carvalho joined Brentford on a five-year deal, with a further one-year option. He scored his first Premier League goal for Brentford in a 5–3 victory against Wolverhampton Wanderers on 5 October 2024. He netted a late equaliser in a 2–2 draw against Chelsea on 13 September 2025. He then suffered a season-ending ACL injury during training in late November 2025.

== International career ==
Carvalho has represented England up to under-18 level.

Carvalho was called up to Portugal's under-21 team on 17 March 2022, ahead of European Championship qualifying games against Iceland and Greece.

In October 2022, he was named in Portugal's preliminary 55-man squad for the 2022 FIFA World Cup in Qatar. However, he was not selected as part of the final 26-man squad.

== Career statistics ==
As of match played 18 September 2026

Appearances and goals by club, season and competition
Club	Season	League			National cup (Note: Includes FA Cup, DFB-Pokal)		League cup (Note: Includes EFL Cup)		Europe		Other		Total	
Club	Season	Division	Apps	Goals	Apps	Goals	Apps	Goals	Apps	Goals	Apps	Goals	Apps	Goals
Fulham U23	2018–19	—			—		—		—		1 (Note: Appearance(s) in EFL Trophy)	0	1	0
Fulham U23	2019–20	—			—		—		—		3	0	3	0
Fulham U23	2020–21	—			—		—		—		2	0	2	0
Fulham U23	Total		—		—		—		—		6	0	6	0
Fulham	2020–21	Premier League	4	1	1	0	1	0	—		—		6	1
Fulham	2021–22	Championship	36	10	2	1	0	0	—		—		38	11
Fulham	Total		40	11	3	1	1	0	—		—		44	12
Liverpool	2022–23	Premier League	13	2	1	0	2	1	4 (Note: Appearances in UEFA Champions League)	0	1 (Note: Appearance in FA Community Shield)	0	21	3
RB Leipzig (loan)	2023–24	Bundesliga	9	0	2	0	—		3	0	1 (Note: Appearance in DFL-Supercup)	0	15	0
Hull City (loan)	2023–24	Championship	20	9	0	0	—		—		—		20	9
Brentford	2024–25	Premier League	19	2	1	0	4	1	—		—		24	3
Brentford	2025–26	Premier League	6	1	0	0	3	2	—		—		9	3
Brentford	2026–27	Premier League	1	1	0	0	1	1	—		—		2	2
Brentford	Total		26	4	1	0	8	4	—		—		35	8
Career total			107	24	7	1	11	5	7	0	8	0	140	30

== Honours ==
Fulham

- EFL Championship: 2021–22

Liverpool

- FA Community Shield: 2022

RB Leipzig

- DFL-Supercup: 2023

Individual

- EFL Young Player of the Month: August 2021, April 2024
- PFA Team of the Year: 2021–22 Championship
