= 2021–22 Fulham F.C. season =

Fulham
2021–22 season
- Owner: Shahid Khan
- Chairman: Shahid Khan
- Head coach: Marco Silva
- Stadium: Craven Cottage
- Championship: 1st (promoted)
- FA Cup: Fourth round
- EFL Cup: Third round
- Top goalscorer: League: Aleksandar Mitrović (43); All: Aleksandar Mitrović (43)
- Highest home attendance: 19,538 (vs Luton Town, Championship, 2 May)
- Lowest home attendance: 11,299 (vs Leeds United, EFL Cup, 21 September)
- Average home league attendance: 17,774
Home colours	Away colours

The 2021–22 season was Fulham's 124th season in existence and their first season back in the Championship, following relegation from the Premier League the previous season. Alongside the Championship, the club reached the fourth round of the FA Cup, and the third round of the EFL Cup. The season covers the period from July 2021 to 30 June 2022.

On 19 April 2022, Fulham secured promotion back to the Premier League following a 3–0 home win over Preston North End. With a 7–0 win over Luton Town on 2 May, Fulham were confirmed as champions.

== Managerial changes ==
During pre-season, head coach Scott Parker left the club by mutual consent. Later, he was appointed as new AFC Bournemouth head coach following the sacking of Jonathan Woodgate. Two days later, Portuguese football manager Marco Silva was appointed to replace him as head coach on a three-year deal.

== Pre-season friendlies ==
The Whites announced a pre-season friendly against Millwall F.C. as well as Charlton Athletic as part of their preparations for the new season.

24 July 2021 Friendly	Southampton	1–1	Fulham	Marchwood
14:00 BST	Long 4'	Report	Kebano 70' (pen.)	Stadium: Staplewood Campus; Attendance: 0 (Behind-closed-doors)

31 July 2021 Friendly	Fulham	1–0	Charlton Athletic	Fulham
15:00 BST	Carvalho 31'	Report		Stadium: Craven Cottage

== Competitions ==
=== Championship ===
==== League table ====
Pos	Team	Pld	W	D	L	GF	GA	GD	Pts	Promotion, qualification or relegation
1	Fulham (C, P)	46	27	9	10	106	43	+63	90	Promotion to the Premier League
2	Bournemouth (P)	46	25	13	8	74	39	+35	88	Promotion to the Premier League
3	Huddersfield Town	46	23	13	10	64	47	+17	82	Qualification for Championship play-offs
4	Nottingham Forest (O, P)	46	23	11	12	73	40	+33	80	Qualification for Championship play-offs
5	Sheffield United	46	21	12	13	63	45	+18	75	Qualification for Championship play-offs
6	Luton Town	46	21	12	13	63	55	+8	75	Qualification for Championship play-offs

Source: EFL Official Website
Rules for classification: 1) Points; 2) Goal difference; 3) Number of goals scored; 4) Head-to-head results; 5) Wins; 6) Away goals; 7) Penalty points (sec 9.5); 8) 12-point sending off offences
(C) Champions; (O) Play-off winners; (P) Promoted

==== Results summary ====
Overall								Home						Away					
Pld	W	D	L	GF	GA	GD	Pts	W	D	L	GF	GA	GD	W	D	L	GF	GA	GD
46	27	9	10	106	43	+63	90	14	4	5	55	20	+35	13	5	5	51	23	+28

Last updated: 7 May 2022.

==== Results by matchday ====
Matchday	1	2	3	4	5	6	7	8	9	10	11	12	13	14	15	16	17	18	19	20	21	22	23	24	25	26	27	28	29	30	31	32	33	34	35	36	37	38	39	40	41	42	43	44	45	46
Ground	H	A	A	H	H	A	A	H	A	H	A	H	H	A	H	A	A	H	H	A	H	A	H	A	H	H	A	H	H	A	H	H	A	H	A	A	A	A	A	H	H	A	H	H	H	A
Result	D	W	W	W	W	L	W	L	D	W	L	W	W	W	W	W	W	W	D	D	D	D	L	W	W	W	W	D	W	W	L	W	W	W	W	D	L	W	W	L	W	D	L	L	W	L
Position	17	1	2	1	1	2	1	2	4	3	5	3	2	2	2	2	2	1	1	1	1	1	1	2	1	1	1	1	1	1	1	1	1	1	1	1	1	1	1	1	1	1	1	1	1	1

Updated to match(es) played on 7 May 2022. Source: Statto.com
A = Away; H = Home; W = Win; D = Draw; L = Loss

==== Matches ====
Fulham's fixtures were announced on 24 June 2021.

8 August 2021 1	Fulham	1–1	Middlesbrough	Fulham
13:30 BST	Mitrović (yellow card) 1'; Wilson 29', (yellow card) 71'	Report	McNair (yellow card) 16'; Ikpeazu (yellow card) 36'; Bola (yellow card) 53', (goal) 77'	Stadium: Craven Cottage; Attendance: 16,058; Referee: Keith Stroud
Note: Live on Sky Sports

14 August 2021 2	Huddersfield Town	1–5	Fulham	Huddersfield
15:00 BST	Pearson 41'; Colwill (yellow card) 73'	Report	Mitrović 9'; Onomah 37'; Reid (yellow card) 39'; Carvalho 43'; Wilson (red card) 72'; Cavaleiro 78', 90+5'	Stadium: John Smith's Stadium; Attendance: 15,126; Referee: Dean Whitestone

17 August 2021 3	Millwall	1–2	Fulham	Bermondsey
19:45 BST	Romeo (yellow card) 19'; Malone (yellow card) 54'; Afobe 87'; Evans (yellow card) 88'; Cooper (yellow card) 89'	Report	Mitrović 3', (yellow card) 90+3'; Carvalho 8'; Gazzaniga (yellow card) 90+5'	Stadium: The Den; Attendance: 12,700; Referee: Geoff Eltringham
Note: Live on Sky Sports

21 August 2021 4	Fulham	2–0	Hull City	Fulham
15:00 BST	Mitrović 22'; Carvalho 34'; Robinson (yellow card) 60'; Cavaleiro (yellow card) 78'; Adarabioyo (yellow card) 81'	Report	Smallwood (yellow card) 45+2'; Bernard (yellow card) 82'	Stadium: Craven Cottage; Attendance: 16,189; Referee: Tim Robinson

28 August 2021 5	Fulham	3–0	Stoke City	Fulham
15:00 BST	Wilson 5'; Reid 53'; Mitrović 72', (penalty missed) 90'+3	Report	Wilmot (yellow card) 40'	Stadium: Craven Cottage; Attendance: 16,791; Referee: Jarred Gillett

11 September 2021 6	Blackpool	1–0	Fulham	Blackpool
15:00 BST	Bowler 49'; Stewart (yellow card) 53'; Lawrence-Gabriel (yellow card) 86'; Garbutt (yellow card) 90+2'	Report	Quina (yellow card) 59'; Reed (yellow card) 73'; Odoi (yellow card) 79'	Stadium: Bloomfield Road; Attendance: 11,268; Referee: John Busby

15 September 2021 7	Birmingham City	1–4	Fulham	Bordesley
19:45 BST	Chong (yellow card) 48'; Gardner (yellow card) 67'; Deeney 87' (pen.)	Report	Odoi 10'; Seri (yellow card) 36'; Mitrović 44' (pen.), 83'; Wilson 54'	Stadium: St Andrew's Trillion Trophy Stadium; Attendance: 14,562; Referee: David Webb

18 September 2021 8	Fulham	1–2	Reading	Fulham
15:00 BST	Seri (yellow card) 28'; Wilson (yellow card) 57'; Odoi (yellow card) 65'; Ream (yellow card) 77'; Muniz 86'	Report	Ejaria 19', 53'; Hoilett (yellow card) 34'; Swift (yellow card) 56'; Rahman (yellow card) 58'	Stadium: Craven Cottage; Attendance: 18,901; Referee: Steve Martin

25 September 2021 9	Bristol City	1–1	Fulham	Ashton Gate
15:00 BST	Pring (yellow card) 22'; Palmer 79'	Report	Chalobah (yellow card) 30'; Mitrović 50'; Decordova-Reid (yellow card) 78'; Reed (yellow card) 90'	Stadium: Ashton Gate; Attendance: 19,326; Referee: Simon Hooper

29 September 2021 10	Fulham	3–1	Swansea City	Fulham
19:45 BST	Mitrović 12', 32', 45'	Report	Cabango (yellow card) 23'; Paterson 38'	Stadium: Craven Cottage; Attendance: 16,113; Referee: Josh Smith

2 October 2021 11	Coventry City	4–1	Fulham	Coventry
12:30 BST	Gyökeres 47', 70'; Godden 51'; Maatsen 61', (yellow card) 63'	Report	McFadzean 18' (o.g.); Mitrović (yellow card) 66'; Odoi (yellow card) 69'; Robinson (yellow card) 85'	Stadium: The Coventry Building Society Arena; Attendance: 18,497; Referee: Gavin Ward

16 October 2021 12	Fulham	4–1	Queens Park Rangers	Fulham
15:00 BST	Mitrović 10', 67'; Decordova-Reid 71'; Robinson 90+1'	Report	Ball (yellow card) 7'; Johansen (yellow card) 45'; Dykes 55'; Odubajo (yellow card) 63'; Dunne (yellow card) 70'	Stadium: Craven Cottage; Attendance: 18,371; Referee: Oliver Langford

20 October 2021 13	Fulham	2–0	Cardiff City	Fulham
19:45 BST	Cairney 57'; Mitrović 63'	Report	Bagan (yellow card) 78'; Pack (yellow card) 79'; Ng (yellow card) 85'	Stadium: Craven Cottage; Attendance: 15,789; Referee: Tim Robinson

24 October 2021 14	Nottingham Forest	0–4	Fulham	West Bridgford
15:00 BST	Colback (yellow card) 16'; Zinckernagel (yellow card) 58'; Garner (yellow card) 65'; Yates (yellow card) 66'; Samba (yellow card) 67'	Report	Spence 7' (o.g.); Ream (yellow card) 38'; Odoi (yellow card) 45'; Mitrović 58', 67' (pen.); Kebano 61'; Robinson (yellow card) 69'; Wilson (yellow card) 77'	Stadium: The City Ground; Attendance: 27,470; Referee: James Linington

30 October 2021 15	Fulham	3–0	West Bromwich Albion	Fulham
12:30 BST	Mitrović 20' (pen.), 40', 82'; Adarabioyo (red card) 85'	Report	Ajayi (yellow card) 23'; Bartley (yellow card) 52'; Furlong (red card) 70'; Snodgrass (yellow card) 76'	Stadium: Craven Cottage; Attendance: 18,103; Referee: Michael Salisbury

2 November 2021 16	Blackburn Rovers	0–7	Fulham	Blackburn
19:45 GMT	Van Hecke (red card) 30'; Edun (yellow card) 74'	Report	Kebano 6', 79'; Mitrović 19'; Wilson 54', 58'; Muniz 81', 90+1'	Stadium: Ewood Park; Attendance: 9,326; Referee: Jarred Gillett

6 November 2021 17	Peterborough United	0–1	Fulham	Peterborough
15:00 GMT	Norburn (yellow card) 90'	Report	Odoi (yellow card) 32'; Kebano (yellow card) 66'; Mitrović 74'; Ream (yellow card) 84'; Cairney (yellow card) 90+3'	Stadium: Weston Homes Stadium; Attendance: 11,214; Referee: Dean Whitestone

20 November 2021 18	Fulham	4–1	Barnsley	Fulham
15:00 GMT	Mitrović 24'; Carvalho 34'; Kebano 72'; Wilson 81'	Report	Adeboyejo 78'	Stadium: Craven Cottage; Attendance: 18,047; Referee: Josh Smith

24 November 2021 19	Fulham	0–0	Derby County	Fulham
19:45 GMT	Carvalho (yellow card) 60'	Report	Ebosele (yellow card) 60'; Shinnie (yellow card) 79'	Stadium: Craven Cottage; Attendance: 16,468; Referee: Geoff Eltringham

27 November 2021 20	Preston North End	1–1	Fulham	Preston
12:30 GMT	Van den Berg (yellow card) 26'; Evans 72'	Report	Ream 15'; Robinson (yellow card) 48'; Onomah (yellow card) 80'	Stadium: Deepdale; Attendance: 9,838; Referee: Chris Kavanagh

3 December 2021 21	Fulham	1–1	Bournemouth	Fulham
19:45 GMT	Carvalho (yellow card) 51'; Bryan (yellow card) 68'; Decordova-Reid (yellow card) 82'; Adarabioyo 84'	Report	Cook (yellow card) 16'; Stacey (yellow card) 34'; Solanke 46'; Smith (yellow card) 61'; Travers (yellow card) 62'; Christie (yellow card) 80'; Billing (yellow card) 88'	Stadium: Craven Cottage; Attendance: 19,020; Referee: Tim Robinson

11 December 2021 22	Luton Town	1–1	Fulham	Luton
15:00 GMT	Campbell (yellow card) 42'; Adebayo 62'	Report	Mitrović 19'	Stadium: Kenilworth Road; Attendance: 9,992; Referee: Thomas Bramall

20 December 2021 23	Fulham	0–1	Sheffield United	Fulham
19:45 GMT		Report	Ndiaye 3'; Foderingham (yellow card) 45'; Robinson (yellow card) 55'; Bogle (yellow card) 85'	Stadium: Craven Cottage; Attendance: 17,308; Referee: James Linington

11 January 2022 24	Reading	0–7	Fulham	Reading
20:00 GMT	Drinkwater (yellow card) 41'	Report	Wilson 13', 60'; Mitrović 45+2' (pen.), 89'; Tete 68'; Kebano 70'; Adarabioyo 75'	Stadium: Select Car Leasing Stadium; Attendance: 11,472; Referee: Tony Harrington

15 January 2022 25	Fulham	6–2	Bristol City	Fulham
15:00 GMT	Mitrović 21', 41', 45+1'; Kebano 31', 57'; Carvalho 36'	Report	Semenyo 7', 29'; Pring (yellow card) 46'; Scott (yellow card) 68'	Stadium: Craven Cottage; Attendance: 17,810; Referee: Tim Robinson

18 January 2022 26	Fulham	6–2	Birmingham City	Fulham
19:45 GMT	Roberts 10' (o.g.); Kebano 35'; Carvalho 38', 75'; Cairney 43'; Reed (yellow card) 67'; Robinson 90+3'	Report	Šunjić 45'; Pedersen (yellow card) 52'; Gardner 74'	Stadium: Craven Cottage; Attendance: 16,491; Referee: Gavin Ward

22 January 2022 27	Stoke City	2–3	Fulham	Stoke-on-Trent
15:00 GMT	Wright-Phillips 1'; Brown (yellow card) 39'; Baker 58'; Harwood-Bellis (yellow card) 79'	Report	Muniz 2', 33'; Decordova-Reid 72'	Stadium: Bet365 Stadium; Attendance: 21,749; Referee: Dean Whitestone

29 January 2022 28	Fulham	1–1	Blackpool	Fulham
15:00 GMT	Mitrović 6', (yellow card) 45+1'; Odoi (yellow card) 26'; Carvalho (yellow card) 68'; Wilson (yellow card) 75'	Report	Dougall (yellow card) 39'; Bowler 57'; Gabriel (yellow card) 90+1'	Stadium: Craven Cottage; Attendance: 19,092; Referee: Peter Bankes

8 February 2022 29	Fulham	3–0	Millwall	Fulham
19:45 GMT	Mitrović 29', 50', (yellow card) 84'; Reid 87'	Report	Kieftenbeld (yellow card) 35'; Hutchinson (yellow card) 61'; Bennett (yellow card) 74'	Stadium: Craven Cottage; Attendance: 16,606; Referee: Matt Donohue

12 February 2022 30	Hull City	0–1	Fulham	Kingston upon Hull
16:00 GMT	Slater (yellow card) 19'; Fleming (yellow card) 65'	Report	Mitrović 57'; Reid (yellow card) 89'	Stadium: MKM Stadium; Attendance: 13,022; Referee: Andy Woolmer

19 February 2022 31	Fulham	1–2	Huddersfield Town	Fulham
12:30 GMT	Mitrović (yellow card) 26'; Decordova-Reid 83'; Carvalho (yellow card) 88'	Report	Ward 31'; Holmes 43' (pen.); Hogg (yellow card) 61'	Stadium: Craven Cottage; Attendance: 19,001; Referee: Tony Harrington

23 February 2022 32	Fulham	2–1	Peterborough United	Fulham
19:45 GMT	Mitrović 28' (pen.), 62'	Report	Knight (yellow card) 85'; Marriott 89'	Stadium: Craven Cottage; Attendance: 17,387; Referee: Jarred Gillett

26 February 2022 33	Cardiff City	0–1	Fulham	Leckwith
15:00 GMT	Vaulks (yellow card) 50'; Ralls (yellow card) 53'	Report	Mitrović 41', (yellow card) 87'; Reed (yellow card) 66'	Stadium: Cardiff City Stadium; Attendance: 18,928; Referee: Leigh Doughty

5 March 2022 34	Fulham	2–0	Blackburn Rovers	Fulham
12:30 GMT	Kebano 25'; Wilson 35'; Williams (yellow card) 64'; Ream (yellow card) 80'	Report	Dolan (yellow card) 35'; Lenihan (yellow card) 87'	Stadium: Craven Cottage; Attendance: 19,343; Referee: David Webb

8 March 2022 35	Swansea City	1–5	Fulham	Landore
19:45 GMT	Manning (red card) 42'; Piroe 75'	Report	Mitrović 46'; Cabango 52' (o.g.); Decordova-Reid 73'; Williams 77', 85'	Stadium: Swansea.com Stadium; Attendance: 17,012; Referee: Jarred Gillett

12 March 2022 36	Barnsley	1–1	Fulham	Barnsley
12:30 GMT	Wolfe (yellow card) 23'; Morris 44' (pen.), (yellow card) 61'; Kitching (yellow card) 54'; Quina (yellow card) 73'	Report	Adarabioyo (yellow card) 43'; Ream (yellow card) 66'; Robinson (yellow card) 70'; Wilson 86'	Stadium: Oakwell Stadium; Attendance: 12,576; Referee: Tim Robinson

15 March 2022 37	West Bromwich Albion	1–0	Fulham	West Bromwich
20:00 GMT	Robinson 64'; Molumby (yellow card) 88'	Report	Williams (yellow card) 70'	Stadium: The Hawthorns; Attendance: 20,079; Referee: Kevin Friend

2 April 2022 38	Queens Park Rangers	0–2	Fulham	Shepherd's Bush
15:00 BST	Wallace (yellow card) 51'; Barbet (yellow card) 76'; Field (yellow card) 90+1'	Report	Mitrović 14', 78' (pen.)	Stadium: Kiyan Prince Foundation Stadium; Attendance: 17,648; Referee: Gavin Ward

6 April 2022 39	Middlesbrough	0–1	Fulham	Middlesbrough
19:45 BST	Crooks (yellow card) 72'; McGree (yellow card) 83'; McNair (yellow card) 90+3'	Report	Carvalho (yellow card) 53'; Reed (yellow card) 65'; Mitrović 73'	Stadium: Riverside Stadium; Attendance: 21,995; Referee: James Linington

10 April 2022 40	Fulham	1–3	Coventry City	Fulham
15:00 BST	Wilson (yellow card) 81'; Reid 82'	Report	Rose 20'; Gyökeres 24'; Dabo (yellow card) 42'; Sheaf (yellow card) 61'; Moore (yellow card) 65'; Hamer (yellow card) 80'; O'Hare 90+3'	Stadium: Craven Cottage; Attendance: 19,401; Referee: Keith Stroud

15 April 2022 41	Derby County	2–1	Fulham	Derby
20:00 BST	Thompson (yellow card) 33'; Plange 51'; Lawrence (yellow card) 61'; Adarabioyo 73' (o.g.); Allsop (yellow card) 89'; Cashin (yellow card) 90'	Report	Carvalho 20'; Bryan (yellow card) 90+6'	Stadium: Pride Park Stadium; Attendance: 23,773; Referee: Robert Jones

19 April 2022 42	Fulham	3–0	Preston North End	Fulham
19:45 BST	Mitrović 9', 41'; Cairney (yellow card) 20'; Carvalho 34'	Report	Whiteman (yellow card) 45+1'	Stadium: Craven Cottage; Attendance: 17,760; Referee: Leigh Doughty

23 April 2022 43	Bournemouth	1–1	Fulham	Kings Park
15:00 BST	Cook (yellow card) 1'; Phillips (yellow card) 63'; Smith (yellow card) 76'; Solanke 90+8' (pen.)	Report	Bryan (yellow card) 36'; Mitrović 56', (yellow card) 88'; Reed (yellow card) 60'; Robinson (yellow card) 75'; Rodák (yellow card) 90+1'; Tete (yellow card) 90+3'; Adarabioyo (yellow card) 90+6'	Stadium: Vitality Stadium; Attendance: 10,352; Referee: Graham Scott

26 April 2022 44	Fulham	0–1	Nottingham Forest	Fulham
19:45 BST	Reed (yellow card) 18'; Mitrović (yellow card) 90+3'	Report	Zinckernagel 15', (yellow card) 28'	Stadium: Craven Cottage; Attendance: 19,218; Referee: Josh Smith

2 May 2022 45	Fulham	7–0	Luton Town	Fulham
17:15 BST	Cairney 29'; Tete 39'; Carvalho 54'; Mitrović 62', 90+2', (yellow card) 90+3'; Decordova-Reid 65'; Seri 79'; Wilson (yellow card) 83'	Report	Hylton (yellow card) 11'; Lockyer (yellow card) 27'; Snodgrass (yellow card) 35'; Lansbury (yellow card) 37'; Potts (yellow card) 51'; Muskwe (yellow card) 85'	Stadium: Craven Cottage; Attendance: 19,538; Referee: Tim Robinson

7 May 2022 46	Sheffield United	4–0	Fulham	Sheffield
12:30 BST	Gibbs-White 10'; Ndiaye 21'; Berge 25'; Fleck (yellow card) 27'; Stevens 49', (yellow card) 85'	Report	Hector (yellow card) 68'	Stadium: Bramall Lane; Attendance: 32,050; Referee: Josh Smith

=== FA Cup ===
Fulham were drawn away to Bristol City and Manchester City, in the third and fourth rounds respectively.

8 January 2022 Third round	Bristol City	0–1 (a.e.t.)	Fulham	Ashton Gate
12:30 GMT		Report	Carvalho (yellow card) 19'; Francois (yellow card) 65'; Wilson 105'; Cairney (yellow card) 120'	Stadium: Ashton Gate Stadium; Attendance: 7,304; Referee: Jonathan Moss

5 February 2022 Fourth round	Manchester City	4–1	Fulham	Manchester
15:00 GMT (UTC±0)	Gündoğan 6'; Stones 13'; Walker (yellow card) 45+3'; Mahrez 53' (pen.), 57'	Report	Carvalho 4'	Stadium: Etihad Stadium; Attendance: 53,400; Referee: Jarred Gillett

=== EFL Cup ===
Fulham entered the competition in the second round stage and were drawn away to Birmingham City and at home to Leeds United in the third round.

24 August 2021 Second round	Birmingham City	0–2	Fulham	Bordesley
19:45 BST		Report	Stansfield 26'; Bryan (yellow card) 50'; Hector (yellow card) 56'; Robinson 90+2'	Stadium: St Andrew's Trillion Trophy Stadium; Attendance: 4,783; Referee: Sam Barrott

21 September 2021 Third round	Fulham	0–0 (5–6 p)	Leeds United	Fulham
19:45 BST		Report	Summerville (yellow card) 67'	Stadium: Craven Cottage; Attendance: 11,299; Referee: Tim Robinson
	Penalties
	Onomah (penalty missed); Cavaleiro (penalty scored); Kebano (penalty scored); Bryan (penalty missed); Hector (penalty scored); Decordova-Reid (penalty scored); Rodrigo Muniz (penalty missed)		(penalty scored) Rodrigo; (penalty scored) James; (penalty scored) Phillips; (penalty missed) Dallas; (penalty missed) Forshaw; (penalty scored) Firpo; (penalty scored) Gelhardt; (penalty scored) McKinstry

== Squad statistics ==
=== Appearances and goals ===
No.	Pos	Nat	Player	Total		Championship		FA Cup		EFL Cup	
No.	Pos	Nat	Player	Apps	Goals	Apps	Goals	Apps	Goals	Apps	Goals
Goalkeepers
1	GK	(Slovakia) SVK	Marek Rodák	35	0	33	0	0	0	2	0
21	GK	(Argentina) ARG	Paulo Gazzaniga	15	0	13	0	2	0	0	0
Defenders
2	RB	(Netherlands) NED	Kenny Tete	20	2	15+5	2	0	0	0	0
3	CB	(Jamaica) JAM	Michael Hector	7	0	4	0	1	0	2	0
13	CB	(United States) USA	Tim Ream	47	1	46	1	1	0	0	0
16	CB	(England) ENG	Tosin Adarabioyo	44	2	41	2	2	0	0+1	0
20	RB	(Wales) WAL	Neco Williams	14	2	13	2	1	0	0	0
23	LB	(England) ENG	Joe Bryan	19	0	13+2	0	2	0	2	0
26	CB	(England) ENG	Alfie Mawson	8	0	1+5	0	0	0	2	0
33	LB	(United States) USA	Antonee Robinson	37	3	33+3	2	0	0	0+1	1
Midfielders
6	CM	(England) ENG	Harrison Reed	42	0	32+7	0	1+1	0	1	0
10	CM	(Scotland) SCO	Tom Cairney	28	3	16+10	3	0+2	0	0	0
12	CM	(England) ENG	Nathaniel Chalobah	22	0	11+9	0	2	0	0	0
24	CM	(Ivory Coast) CIV	Jean Michaël Seri	34	1	26+7	1	0+1	0	0	0
25	CM	(England) ENG	Josh Onomah	22	1	8+12	1	0	0	1+1	0
28	AM	(Portugal) POR	Fábio Carvalho	38	11	33+3	10	2	1	0	0
35	CM	(Australia) AUS	Tyrese Francois	4	0	1+1	0	1	0	1	0
46	CM	(Republic of Ireland) IRL	Ollie O'Neill	0	0	0	0	0	0	0	0
48	CM	(Kosovo) KOS	Adrion Pajaziti	1	0	0	0	0	0	1	0
Forwards
7	LW	(Democratic Republic of the Congo) COD	Neeskens Kebano	44	9	31+9	9	1+1	0	2	0
8	RW	(Wales) WAL	Harry Wilson	43	11	40+1	10	1+1	1	0	0
9	ST	(Serbia) SRB	Aleksandar Mitrović	46	43	44	43	1+1	0	0	0
11	RW	(France) FRA	Anthony Knockaert	7	0	0+4	0	0+1	0	2	0
14	LW/AM/RW	(Jamaica) JAM	Bobby Decordova-Reid	44	8	27+14	8	1	0	1+1	0
17	LW	(Portugal) POR	Ivan Cavaleiro	21	2	5+13	2	0+1	0	0+2	0
19	ST	(Brazil) BRA	Rodrigo Muniz	28	5	2+23	5	1+1	0	1	0
65	ST	(England) ENG	Jay Stansfield	2	1	0+1	0	0	0	1	1
Out on Loan
22	RB	(Republic of Ireland) IRL	Cyrus Christie	1	0	0	0	0	0	1	0
29	CM	(Cameroon) CMR	André-Frank Zambo Anguissa	3	0	0+3	0	0	0	0	0
44	GK	(England) ENG	Taye Ashby-Hammond	0	0	0	0	0	0	0	0
45	RB	(United States) USA	Marlon Fossey	0	0	0	0	0	0	0	0
Left during Season
4	RB	(Belgium) BEL	Denis Odoi	20	1	17+1	1	1	0	1	0
20	AM	(Portugal) POR	Domingos Quina	4	0	1+1	0	1	0	1	0
47	ST	(Mauritania) MTN	Aboubakar Kamara	1	0	0+1	0	0	0	0	0

Last updated: 7 May 2022
Source: Competitions, SoccerWay.com

=== Top scorers ===
Includes all competitive matches. The list is sorted by squad number when total goals are equal.

Last updated 7 May 2022

Rank	No.	Nationality	Player	Championship	FA Cup	EFL Cup	Total
1	9	(Serbia)	Aleksandar Mitrović	43	0	0	43
2	8	(Wales)	Harry Wilson	10	1	0	11
2	28	(Portugal)	Fábio Carvalho	10	1	0	11
4	7	(Democratic Republic of the Congo)	Neeskens Kebano	9	0	0	9
5	14	(Jamaica)	Bobby Decordova-Reid	8	0	0	8
6	19	(Brazil)	Rodrigo Muniz	5	0	0	5
7	10	(Scotland)	Tom Cairney	3	0	0	3
7	33	(United States)	Antonee Robinson	2	0	1	3
9	2	(Netherlands)	Kenny Tete	2	0	0	2
9	16	(England)	Tosin Adarabioyo	2	0	0	2
9	17	(Portugal)	Ivan Cavaleiro	2	0	0	2
9	20	(Wales)	Neco Williams	2	0	0	2
13	4	(Belgium)	Denis Odoi	1	0	0	1
13	13	(United States)	Tim Ream	1	0	0	1
13	24	(Ivory Coast)	Jean Michaël Seri	1	0	0	1
13	25	(England)	Josh Onomah	1	0	0	1
13	65	(England)	Jay Stansfield	0	0	1	1
Own goals				4	0	0	4
TOTALS				106	2	2	110

== Transfers ==
=== Transfers in ===
Date	Position	Nationality	Name	From	Fee	Ref.
24 July 2021	GK	(Argentina)	Paulo Gazzaniga	(England) Tottenham Hotspur	Free transfer	
24 July 2021	RW	(Wales)	Harry Wilson	(England) Liverpool	£12,000,000	
20 August 2021	CF	(Brazil)	Rodrigo Muniz	(Brazil) Flamengo	Undisclosed	
31 August 2021	DM	(England)	Nathaniel Chalobah	(England) Watford	Free transfer	

=== Loans in ===
Date from	Position	Nationality	Name	From	Date until	Ref.
31 August 2021	CM	(Portugal)	Domingos Quina	(England) Watford	1 February 2022 (Note: On 1 February, Quina's loan was terminated.)	
1 February 2022	RB	(Wales)	Neco Williams	(England) Liverpool	End of season	

=== Loans out ===
Date from	Position	Nationality	Name	To	Date until	Ref.
28 July 2021	CF	(England)	Timmy Abraham	(Wales) Newport County	End of season	
30 July 2021	CB	(England)	Jerome Opoku	(Denmark) Vejle	End of season	
4 August 2021	LW	(Bulgaria)	Sylvester Jasper	(England) Colchester United	January 2022	
12 August 2021	GK	(England)	George Wickens	(England) Wealdstone	End of season	
31 August 2021	DM	(Cameroon)	André-Frank Zambo Anguissa	(Italy) Napoli	End of season	
7 October 2021	GK	(England)	Jacob Adams	(England) Walton Casuals	End of season	
26 October 2021	GK	(England)	Taye Ashby-Hammond	(England) Boreham Wood	End of season	
3 January 2022	RB	(United States)	Marlon Fossey	(England) Bolton Wanderers	End of season	
7 January 2022	CF	(Finland)	Terry Ablade	(England) AFC Wimbledon	End of season	
13 January 2022	RB	(Republic of Ireland)	Cyrus Christie	(Wales) Swansea City	End of season	
31 January 2022	LW	(Bulgaria)	Sylvester Jasper	(Scotland) Hibernian	End of season	
31 January 2022	FW	(France)	Jean-Pierre Tiéhi	(France) Rodez	End of season	
31 January 2022	RB	(England)	Steven Sessegnon	(England) Plymouth Argyle	End of season	
14 February 2022	DM	(England)	Jonathon Page	(England) Merstham	12 March 2022	
15 February 2022	GK	(England)	Luca Ashby-Hammond	(England) Stockport County	March 2022	

=== Transfers out ===
Date	Position	Nationality	Name	To	Fee	Ref.
30 June 2021	LB	(England)	Jordan Aina		Released	
30 June 2021	GK	(England)	Marcus Bettinelli	(England) Chelsea	Contract expired	
30 June 2021	CM	(England)	Ryan De Havilland	(England) Barnet	Released	
30 June 2021	LB	(England)	Lesley Duru	(England) Chesham United	Released	
30 June 2021	CM	(England)	Jayden Harris	(England) Aldershot Town	Released	
30 June 2021	DM	(Scotland)	Kevin McDonald	(Scotland) Dundee United	Released	
30 June 2021	LB	(England)	Jaydn Mundle-Smith	(England) Dulwich Hamlet	Released	
30 June 2021	CB	(England)	Luca Murphy		Released	
30 June 2021	GK	(Philippines)	Julian Schwarzer		Released	
30 June 2021	CF	(England)	Martell Taylor-Crossdale	(England) Weymouth	Released	
7 July 2021	MF	(England)	Jake Gee	(England) Brighton & Hove Albion	Free transfer	
9 July 2021	RB	(England)	Jayden Barber	(England) Aston Villa	Undisclosed	
24 July 2021	CM	(Norway)	Stefan Johansen	(England) Queens Park Rangers	£600,000	
30 July 2021	CF	(England)	Mika Biereth	(England) Arsenal	Undisclosed	
17 August 2021	CF	(Mauritania)	Aboubakar Kamara	(Greece) Aris Thessaloniki	£4,000,000	
26 August 2021	CB	(France)	Maxime Le Marchand	(France) RC Strasbourg Alsace	Undisclosed	
31 August 2021	CM	(Thailand)	Ben Davis	(England) Oxford United	Undisclosed	
25 January 2022	GK	(United States)	Damian Las	(United States) Austin	Undisclosed	
1 February 2022	RB	(Belgium)	Denis Odoi	(Belgium) Club Brugge	Undisclosed	
