= Vinicius Mello =

Brazilian footballer

Personal information
- Full name: Vinicius Silveira de Mello
- Date of birth: 19 August 2002 (age 24)
- Place of birth: Sapucaia do Sul, Brazil
- Height: 1.82 m (6 ft 0 in)
- Position: Forward

Team information
- Current team: Al Jazira
- Number: 99

Youth career
- –2021: Internacional

Senior career*
Years	Team	Apps	(Gls)
2021	Internacional	11	(0)
2022–2024	Charlotte FC	3	(0)
2023	→ Crown Legacy FC (loan)	11	(5)
2024	Čukarički	21	(11)
2024–	Al Jazira	21	(5)
- * Club domestic league appearances and goals as of 12:30, 26 June 2024 (UTC)

Vinicius Silveira de Mello (born 19 August 2002) is a Brazilian professional footballer who plays as a forward for UAE Pro League club Al Jazira.

== Club career ==
Vinicius Mello made his professional debut for Sport Club Internacional on 27 February 2021, starting in the 1-0 Campeonato Gaúcho win against Juventude, among a very rejuvenated side.

During the start of this 2021 season, Vinicius was one of the most brilliant of Inter under-20s, scoring 5 goals and providing 1 assist in the first 4 games, having also signed a contract with the club until 2023, with a reported release clause of 60 million euros.

In May 2021, he was part of the Copa Libertadores squad who played the game against Always Ready, also playing the semi-final of the Copa do Brasil Sub-20 at the end of the month.

He played his first Série A game for Inter on 16 June 2021, replacing Yuri Alberto at the 76th minute of a 0-1 home loss against Atlético Minero.

On 13 December 2021, Mello joined Major League Soccer expansion side Charlotte FC.

== Career statistics ==
As of match played 13 December 2025

Appearances and goals by club, season and competition
Club	Season	League			State league		National cup (Note: Includes Copa do Brasil, U.S. Open Cup, Serbian Cup and UAE President's Cup)		Continental		Other		Total	
Club	Season	Division	Apps	Goals	Apps	Goals	Apps	Goals	Apps	Goals	Apps	Goals	Apps	Goals
Internacional	2021	Série A	8	0	3 (Note: Appearance(s) in Campeonato Gaúcho)	0	0	0	2 (Note: Appearance(s) in Copa Libertadores)	0	—		13	0
Charlotte FC	2023	MLS	3	0	—		0	0	0	0	0	0	3	0
Crown Legacy (loan)	2023	MLS Next Pro	11	5	—		—		—		—		11	5
Čukarički	2023–24	Serbian SuperLiga	13	6	—		1	0	0	0	—		14	6
Čukarički	2024–25	Serbian SuperLiga	8	5	—		0	0	—		—		8	5
Čukarički	Total		21	11	—		1	0	0	0	—		22	11
Al Jazira	2024–25	UAE Pro League	19	5	—		3	0	—		5 (Note: Appearance(s) in UAE League Cup)	2	27	7
Al Jazira	2025–26	UAE Pro League	8	2	—		1	0	—		4	1	13	3
Al Jazira	Total		27	7	—		4	0	—		9	3	40	10
Career total			70	23	3	0	5	0	2	0	9	3	89	26
