= Ali Abdulla Ali =

Emirati association football player (born 1998)

Ali Abdulla علي عبد الله
Personal information
- Full name: Ali Abdulla Ali Al Ansari Al-Bloushi
- Date of birth: 4 September 1998 (age 28)
- Place of birth: United Arab Emirates
- Height: 1.74 m (5 ft 9 in)
- Position: Right-back

Team information
- Current team: Al Orooba
- Number: 2

Youth career
- –2018: Al Wasl

Senior career*
Years	Team	Apps	(Gls)
2018–2024	Al Wasl	3	(0)
2021–2022	→ Masfout (loan)		
2022–2023	→ Hatta (loan)		
2024	→ Emirates (loan)	12	(0)
2024–2025	Dibba Al-Hisn	20	(0)
2025–	Al Orooba	0	(0)
- * Club domestic league appearances and goals

Ali Abdulla Ali Al Ansari (Arabic:علي عبد الله علي الأنصاري) (born 4 September 1998) is an Emirati footballer. He currently plays for Al Orooba as a right back.

== Career ==
=== Al-Wasl ===
Ali Abdulla started his career at Al-Wasl and is a product of the Al-Wasl's youth system. On 17 March 2018, Ali Abdulla made his professional debut for Al-Wasl against Al Dhafra in the Pro League, replacing Salem Al-Azizi .
