= Humaid Al-Najjar =

Emirati footballer (born 1989)

Personal information
- Full name: Humaid Abdullah Ali Al-Najjar
- Date of birth: 22 February 1989 (age 37)
- Place of birth: United Arab Emirates
- Height: 1.76 m (5 ft 9 1/2 in)
- Position: Goalkeeper

Team information
- Current team: Al Orooba
- Number: 12

Youth career
- Al-Nasr

Senior career*
Years	Team	Apps	(Gls)
2009–2012	Al-Nasr	2	(0)
2012–2016	Dibba Al Fujairah	28	(0)
2016–2022	Al-Wasl	62	(0)
2022–2024	Dibba Al Fujairah	45	(0)
2024–	Al Orooba	0	(0)
- * Club domestic league appearances and goals

Humaid Al-Najjar (Arabic:حميد النجار) (born 22 February 1989) is an Emirati footballer. He currently plays for Al Orooba as a goalkeeper.
