= Yousef Ayman =

Emirati footballer (born 1999)

Yousef Ayman يوسف أيمن
Personal information
- Full name: Yousef Ayman Yousef Al-Mansouri
- Date of birth: 7 April 1999 (age 27)
- Place of birth: Emirates
- Height: 1.70 m (5 ft 7 in)
- Position: Midfielder

Team information
- Current team: Al Dhafra
- Number: 18

Youth career
- –2019: Al Jazira

Senior career*
Years	Team	Apps	(Gls)
2019–2024	Al Jazira	29	(0)
2024	→ Al Dhafra(loan)		
2024–	Al Dhafra		
- * Club domestic league appearances and goals

Yousef Ayman (born 7 April 1999) is an Emirati footballer who plays as midfielder for Al Dhafra.
