= Mohammed Sabeel (footballer, born 1991) =

Emirati association football player

Mohammed Sabeel محمد سبيل
Personal information
- Full name: Mohammed Sabeel Mousa Shahin
- Date of birth: 8 September 1991 (age 35)
- Place of birth: Emirates
- Height: 1.75 m (5 ft 9 in)
- Position: Defender

Team information
- Current team: Dibba Al-Hisn
- Number: 33

Youth career
- 2005–2011: Al-Shabab

Senior career*
Years	Team	Apps	(Gls)
2011–2013	Al-Shabab		
2013–2014	Al Jazirah Al-Hamra		
2014–2015	Masafi		
2015–2017	Dubai		
2017–2020	Ajman	59	(1)
2020–2026	Kalba	81	(1)
2026–	Dibba Al-Hisn	0	(0)
- * Club domestic league appearances and goals

Mohammed Sabeel (Arabic: محمد سبيل) (born 8 September 1991) is an Emirati footballer. He currently plays as a defender for Dibba Al-Hisn.

== Career ==
Mohammed Sabeel started his career at Al-Shabab and is a product of the Al-Shabab's youth system. And then he played with Al Jazirah Al-Hamra and Masafi.

=== Dubai ===
On 4 May 2015 left Masafi and signed with Dubai.

=== Ajman ===
On 7 August 2017 left Dubai and signed with Ajman. On 15 September 2017, Mohammed Sabeel made his professional debut for Ajman against Al-Jazira in the Pro League.

=== Kalba ===
On 20 June 2020 left Ajman and signed with Kalba.
