= Leandro Spadacio =

Brazilian footballer (born 2000)

Personal information
- Full name: Leandro Spadacio Leite
- Date of birth: 17 February 2000 (age 26)
- Height: 1.82 m (6 ft 0 in)
- Position: Midfielder

Team information
- Current team: Kalba
- Number: 77

Youth career
- –2019: Fluminense

Senior career*
Years	Team	Apps	(Gls)
2019–2023	Shabab Al Ahli	3	(0)
2021–2022	→ Ajman (loan)	30	(7)
2022–2023	→ Kalba (loan)	12	(1)
2023–	Kalba	23	(4)
- * Club domestic league appearances and goals as of 17:17, 1 February 2020 (UTC)

Leandro Spadacio Leite (born 17 February 2000) is a Brazilian footballer who currently plays for Kalba.

== Career statistics ==
=== Club ===
As of 1 February 2020.

Club	Season	League			Cup		Continental		Other		Total	
Club	Season	Division	Apps	Goals	Apps	Goals	Apps	Goals	Apps	Goals	Apps	Goals
Shabab Al Ahli	2019–20	UAE Pro League	0	0	1 (Note: Appearances in the UAE League Cup)	0	0	0	0	0	1	0
Career total			0	0	1	0	0	0	0	0	1	0
