= Benjamin Ayim =

Ghanaian association football player

Personal information
- Full name: Benjamin Ayim
- Date of birth: 19 February 2000 (age 26)
- Place of birth: Ghana
- Height: 1.65 m (5 ft 5 in)
- Positions: Attacking midfielder; left back

Team information
- Current team: Nova Star SC
- Number: 12

Youth career
- 2018: Dreams

Senior career*
Years	Team	Apps	(Gls)
2018–2019	Al-Falah		
2019–2022	Al-Dhafra	40	(4)
2022–2024	Khor Fakkan	33	(4)
2024–2025	Emirates	10	
2026	Nova Star SC	2	(2)
- * Club domestic league appearances and goals as of 14:4, 28 December 2020 (UTC)

Benjamin Ayim (born 19 February 2000) is a left footed Ghanaian footballer who currently plays as an attacking midfielder for Nova star in UAE.

== Career statistics ==
=== Club ===
As of 28 December 2020.

Club	Season	League			Cup		Continental		Other		Total	
Club	Season	Division	Apps	Goals	Apps	Goals	Apps	Goals	Apps	Goals	Apps	Goals
Nova star SC	2026	UAE Second Division League										
Emirates Club	2024-25	UAE First Division League	10	0			0	0	0	0	10	
Khor Fakkan Club	2021-24	UAE Pro League	33	4			0	0	0	0	33	4
Al-Dhafra	2020–21	UAE Pro League	40	4	2 (Note: Appearances in the UAE League Cup)	0	0	0	0	0	40	4
Career total			83	10	2	0	0	0	0	0	83	10
