= Korofina, Mali =

District of Bamako, Mali

Coordinates: 12°40′19″N 07°55′48″W

Korofina is a district of Bamako in Mali.

== Transport ==
It is served by a station on the Dakar-Niger Railway extending past Bamako.

=== Gallery ===
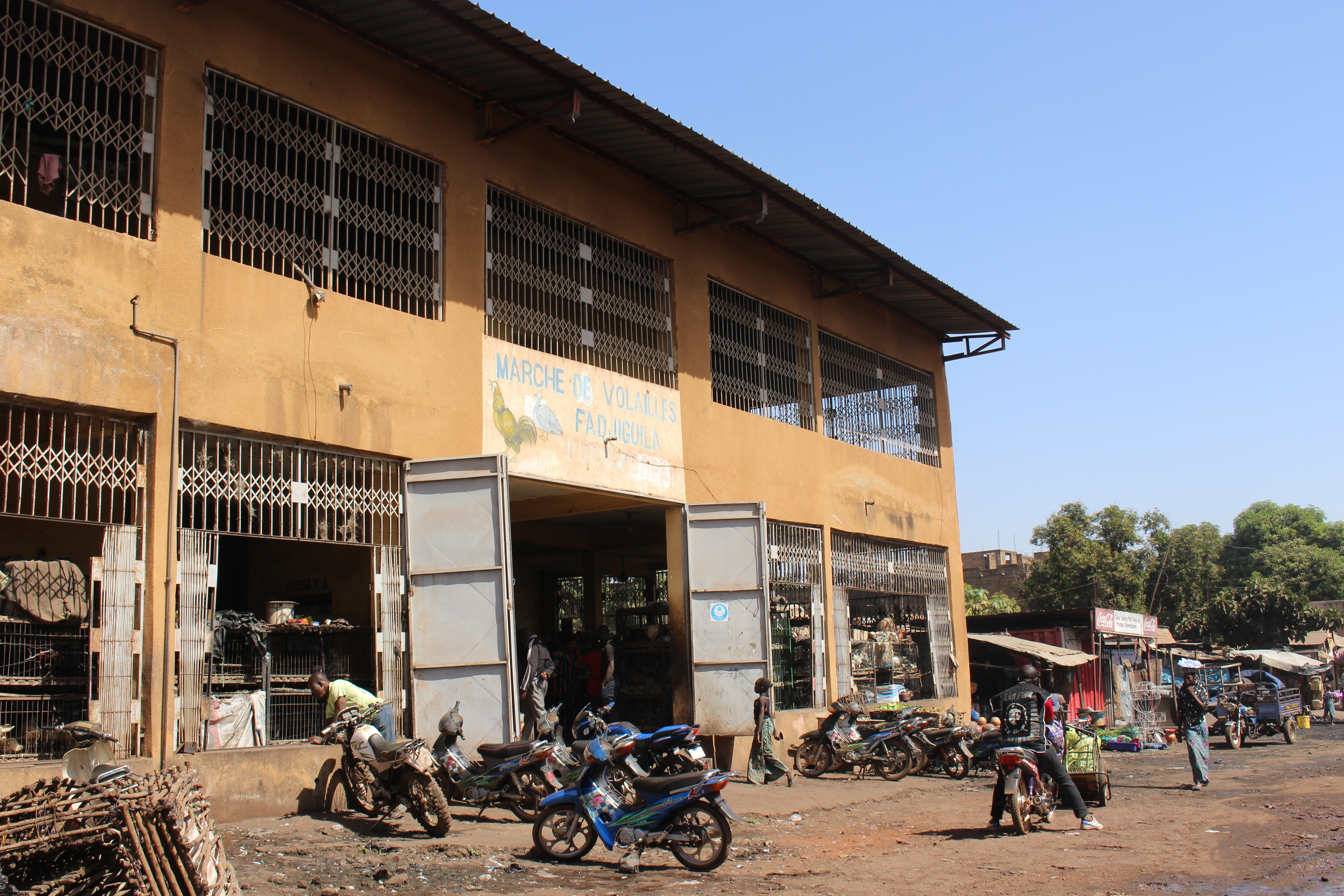

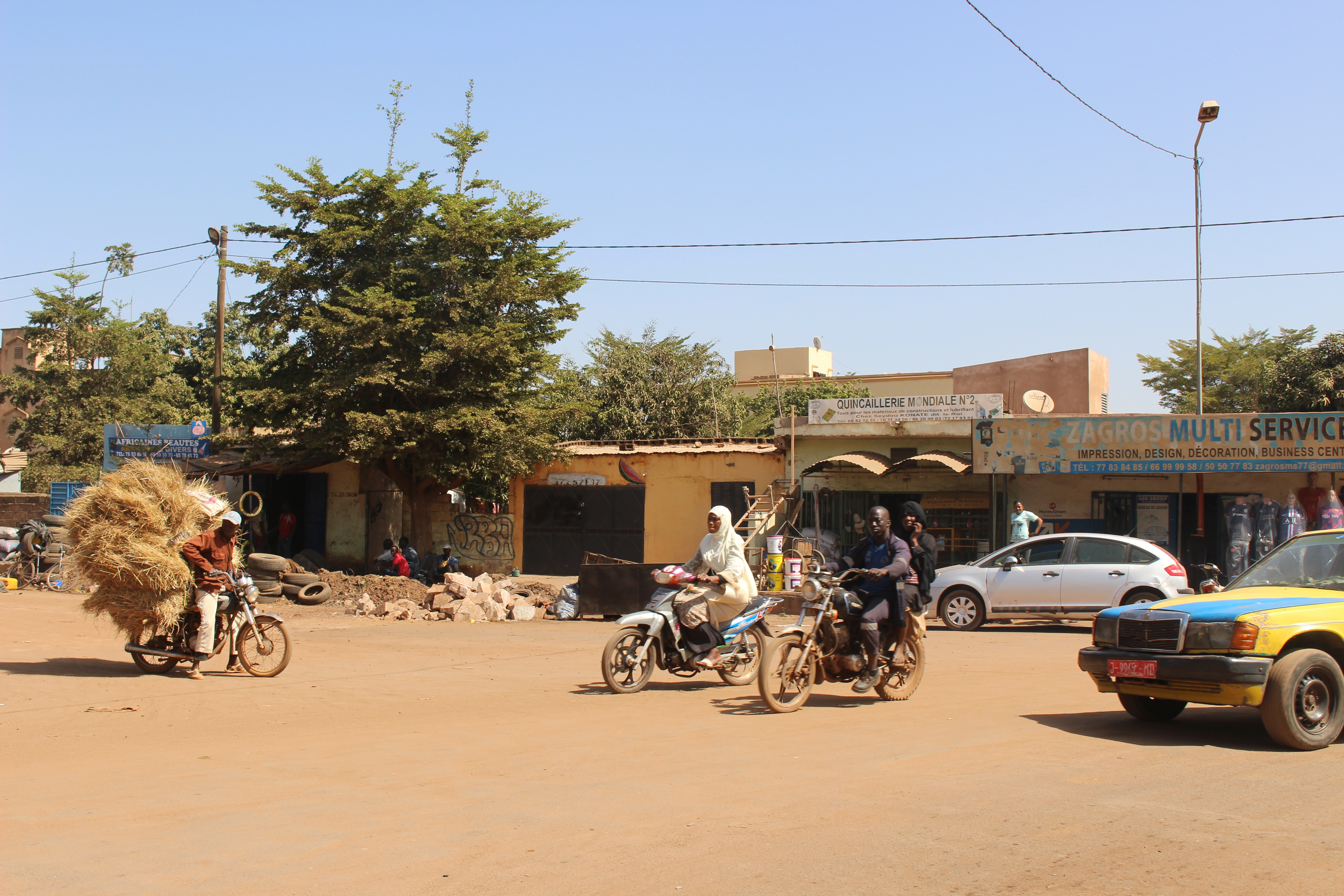

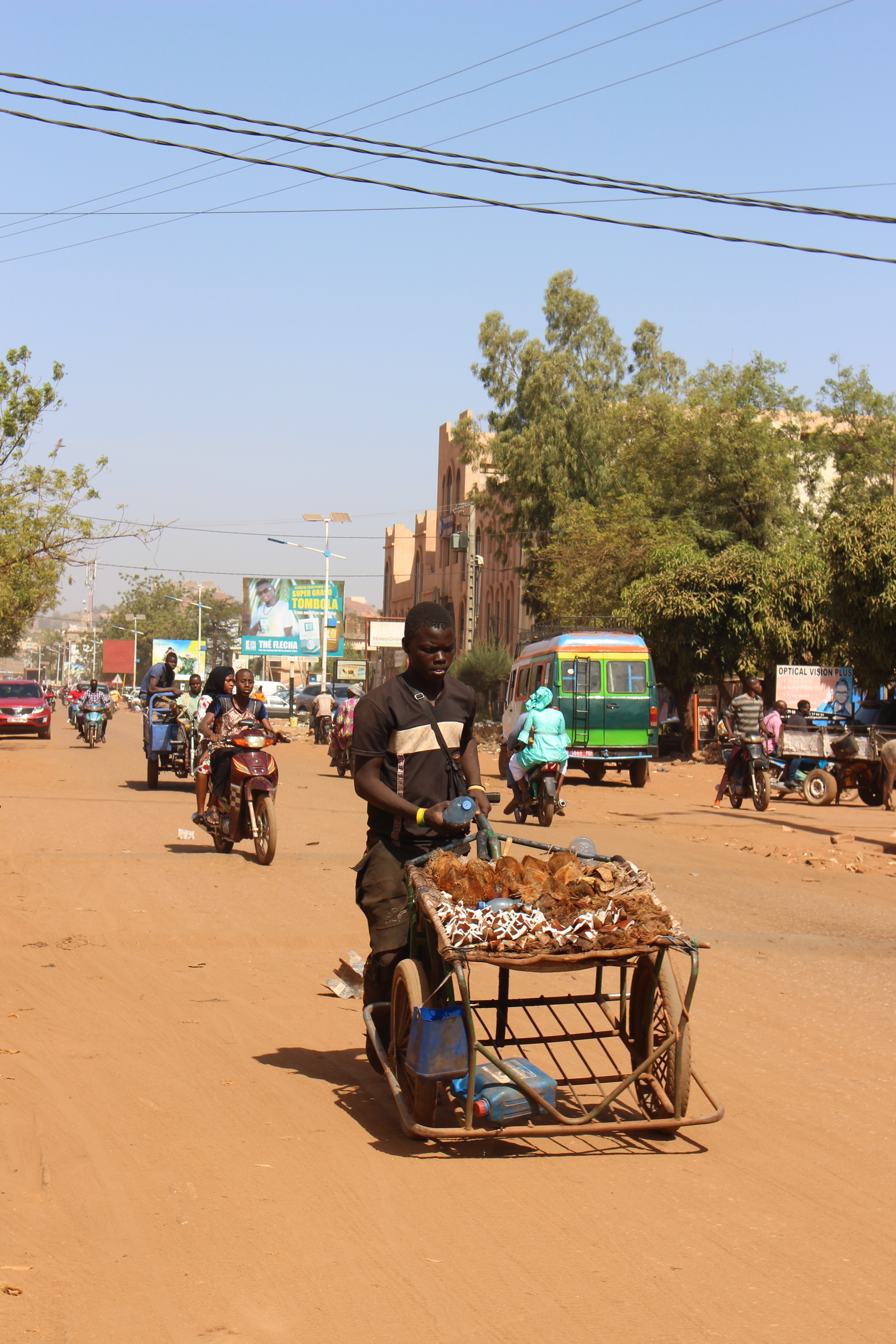

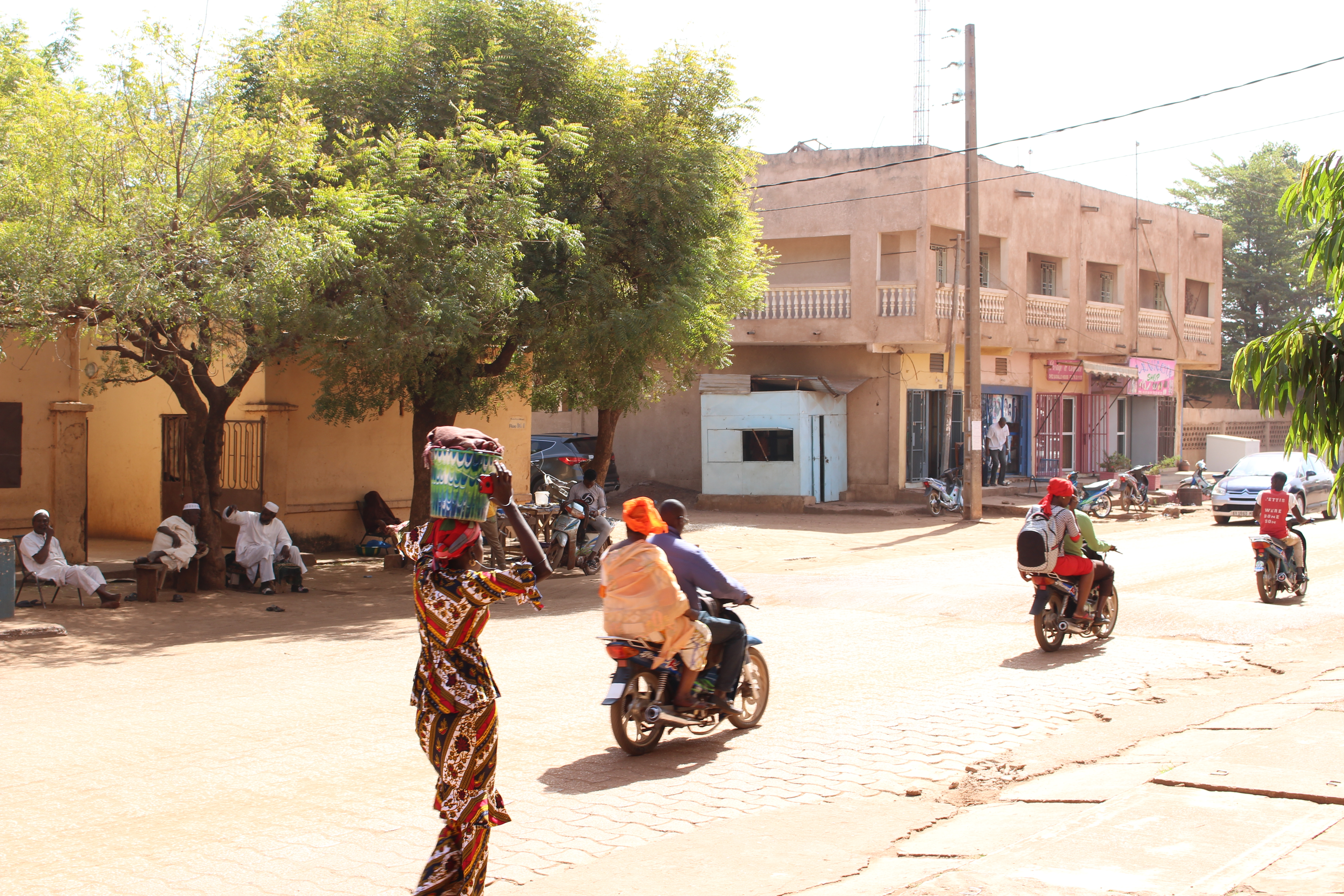

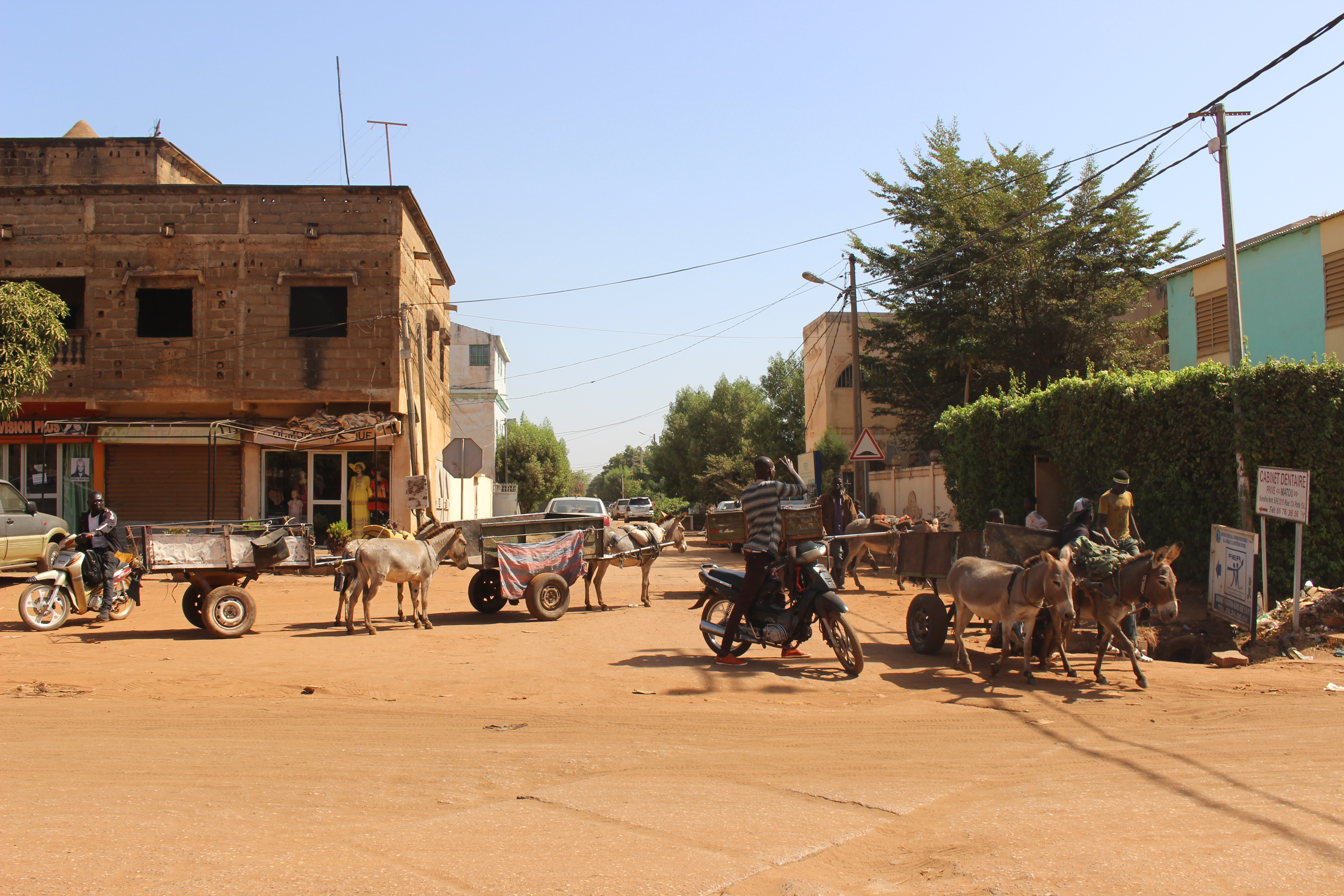

== See also ==
- Railway stations in Mali
