= Lucas Mezenga =

Brazilian footballer

Personal information
- Full name: Lucas de Souza Mombra Rosa
- Date of birth: 20 October 2001 (age 25)
- Place of birth: Rio de Janeiro, Brazil
- Height: 1.85 m (6 ft 1 in)
- Position: Centre-back

Team information
- Current team: Al Orooba
- Number: 3

Youth career
- Nova Iguaçu

Senior career*
Years	Team	Apps	(Gls)
2020–2021	Nova Iguaçu	18	(0)
2021	→ Botafogo (loan)	4	(0)
2022–2024	Botafogo	9	(1)
2023–2024	→ Tondela (loan)	10	(1)
2024–	Al Orooba	0	(0)
- * Club domestic league appearances and goals as of 4 January 2024

Lucas de Souza Mombra Rosa (born 20 October 2001), commonly known as Lucas Mezenga, is a Brazilian professional footballer who plays as a centre-back for Al Orooba.

== Club career ==
Born in Rio de Janeiro, Lucas Mezenga was a Nova Iguaçu youth graduate. He made his first team debut on 4 July 2020, starting in a 1–1 Campeonato Carioca away draw against America-RJ.

On 7 June 2021, Lucas Mezenga moved on loan to Botafogo on loan, being initially assigned to the under-20 squad. He asked to leave the club in September after having an offer from Emirates Club, but the move was denied in the following month. On 13 December, he still signed a permanent deal with Fogão.

Lucas Mezenga scored his first senior goal on 7 March 2022, netting the second in a 5–0 home routing of Volta Redonda. He made his Série A debut on 17 July, coming on as a second-half substitute for fellow debutant DG in a 1–0 away loss against Atlético Mineiro.

On 21 August 2023, Liga Portugal 2 side Tondela announced the signing of Lucas Mezenga on a season-long loan from Botafogo.

== Personal life ==
Lucas Mezenga is the godson of another footballer, Bruno Mezenga.

== Career statistics ==
As of match played 15 January 2023

Club	Season	League			State league		National cup		League cup		Continental		Total	
Club	Season	Division	Apps	Goals	Apps	Goals	Apps	Goals	Apps	Goals	Apps	Goals	Apps	Goals
Nova Iguaçu	2020	Carioca	—		8	0	—		—		—		8	0
Nova Iguaçu	2021	Carioca	—		10	0	—		—		—		10	0
Nova Iguaçu	Total		—		18	0	—		—		—		18	0
Botafogo	2021	Série B	4	0	—		—		—		—		4	0
Botafogo	2022	Série A	4	0	4	1	0	0	—		—		8	1
Botafogo	2023	Série A	0	0	1	0	0	0	—		0	0	1	0
Botafogo	Total		8	0	5	1	0	0	—		0	0	13	1
Tondela (loan)	2023–24	Liga Portugal 2	0	0	—		0	0	0	0	—		0	0
Career total			8	0	23	1	0	0			0	0	31	1
