= Oumar Traoré (footballer, born 2002) =

Malian footballer (born 2002)

Personal information
- Date of birth: 20 July 2002 (age 24)
- Place of birth: Korofina, Bamako, Mali
- Height: 1.72 m (5 ft 8 in)
- Position: Midfielder

Team information
- Current team: Al Jazira
- Number: 19

Senior career*
Years	Team	Apps	(Gls)
2017	ASO Missira		
2018–2020	Stade Malien		
2020–	Al Jazira	110	(16)

International career
2019	Mali	3	(1)
- * Club domestic league appearances and goals as of 12:27, 26 September 2025 (UTC)

Oumar Traoré (Gulf Arabic: عمر تراوري; born 20 July 2002) is a Malian professional footballer who plays as a midfielder for UAE Pro League club Al Jazira.

== International career ==
Traoré acquired Emirati citizenship in 2023. On 24 September 2025, FIFA approved his request to change his sporting nationality from Malian to Emirati, making him eligible to play for the United Arab Emirates national team.

== Career statistics ==
=== Club ===
As of 11 December 2023.

Appearances and goals by club, season and competition
Club	Season	League			President Cup		Continental		Other		Total	
Club	Season	Division	Apps	Goals	Apps	Goals	Apps	Goals	Apps	Goals	Apps	Goals
Al Jazira	2020–21	UAE Pro League	25	5	1	0	0	0	2 (Note: Appearances in UAE League Cup)	0	28	5
Al Jazira	2021–22	UAE Pro League	18	3	2	0	2 (Note: Appearances in AFC Champions League)	1	7 (Note: Five appearances in UAE League Cup, two appearances in FIFA Club World Cup)	0	29	4
Al Jazira	2022–23	UAE Pro League	26	0	3	2	0	0	5	2	27	5
Al Jazira	2023–24	UAE Pro League	9	2	0	0	0	0	3	3	12	5
Al Jazira	Total		78	10	6	2	2	1	17	5	103	16
Career total			78	10	6	2	2	1	17	5	103	16

=== International ===
As of matches played 21 September 2019.

Appearances and goals by national team and year
National team	Year	Apps	Goals
Mali
Mali	2019	3	1
Total		3	1

Scores and results list Mali's goal tally first, score column indicates score after each Traoré goal.

List of international goals scored by Oumar Traoré
No.	Date	Venue	Opponent	Score	Result	Competition
1	4 August 2019	Stade Modibo Kéïta, Bamako, Mali	Guinea-Bissau	3–0	3–0	2020 African Nations Championship qualification
