= Mamadou Coulibaly (footballer, born 2003) =

Football player

Personal information
- Date of birth: 3 June 2003 (age 23)
- Place of birth: Ivory Coast
- Height: 1.70 m (5 ft 7 in)
- Position: Midfielder

Team information
- Current team: Al Jazira
- Number: 8

Senior career*
Years	Team	Apps	(Gls)
2021–	Al Jazira	36	(1)

International career^{‡}
2026–	United Arab Emirates	5	(0)
- * Club domestic league appearances and goals as of 8 December 2023 ‡ National team caps and goals as of 17 November 2026

Mamadou Coulibaly (born 3 June 2003) is a professional footballer who currently plays as a midfielder for Al Jazira. Born in Ivory Coast, he plays for the United Arab Emirates national team.

== Personal life ==
He acquired Emirati citizenship in 2023.

== Career statistics ==
=== Club ===
As of 8 December 2023.

Club	Season	League			Cup		Continental		Other		Total	
Club	Season	Division	Apps	Goals	Apps	Goals	Apps	Goals	Apps	Goals	Apps	Goals
Al Jazira	2021–22	UAE Pro League	7	0	2 (Note: Appearances in the UAE League Cup)	0	1	0	2 (Note: Appearances in the FIFA Club World Cup)	0	12	0
Al Jazira	2022–23	UAE Pro League	20	1	7	0	0	0	0	0	27	0
Al Jazira	2023–24	UAE Pro League	9	0	3	0	0	0	0	0	12	0
Career total			36	1	12	0	1	0	2	0	51	0
