= Mohammed Rabii (footballer) =

Moroccan footballer (born 2001)

Personal information
- Date of birth: 29 September 2001 (age 25)
- Place of birth: Casablanca, Morocco
- Height: 1.84 m (6 ft 0 in)
- Position: Defender

Team information
- Current team: Al Jazira
- Number: 15

Youth career
- –2019: Wydad AC

Senior career*
Years	Team	Apps	(Gls)
2019–	Al Jazira	75	(3)
2022–2023	→ Ittihad Kalba (loan)	1	(0)

International career^{‡}
2025–	United Arab Emirates	1	(0)
- * Club domestic league appearances and goals as of 20:30, 13 November 2025 (UTC) ‡ National team caps and goals as of 20:23, 13 November 2025 (UTC)

Mohammed Rabii (born 29 September 2001) is a professional footballer who plays as a defender for Al Jazira in the UAE Pro League. Born in Morocco, he represents the United Arab Emirates national team.

== Career statistics ==
=== Club ===
As of 1 February 2020.

Club	Season	League			Cup		Continental		Other		Total	
Club	Season	Division	Apps	Goals	Apps	Goals	Apps	Goals	Apps	Goals	Apps	Goals
Al Jazira	2019–20	UAE Pro League	4	0	4 (Note: Appearances in the UAE League Cup)	0	0	0	0	0	8	0
Career total			4	0	4	0	0	0	0	0	8	0
