= Al Jazira Club =

Association football club in United Arab Emirates

Al-Jazira الجزيرة
- Full name: Al-Jazira Club
- Nicknames: Al Ankabout (The Spider); Fakhr Abu Dhabi (Pride of Abu Dhabi)
- Founded: 1974; 52 years ago
- Ground: Mohammed bin Zayed Stadium
- Capacity: 36,186
- Chairman: Sheikh Mansour
- Coach: Cosmin Olăroiu
- League: UAE Pro League
- 2025–26: UAE Pro League, 4th of 14
- Website: jc.ae
Home colours	Away colours

Al-Jazira Club (Arabic: الجزيرة, romanized: al-Jazīra, lit. 'The Island') is an Emirati professional football club based in Abu Dhabi, that currently competes in the UAE Pro League.

== History ==
Al-Jazira was established in 1974 as a merger between Khalidiyah and Al Bateen. The club struggled to stay in the league, getting relegated on multiple occasions during the 1980s and 1990s, but experienced a recent success when Sheikh Mansour invested into them in the 2000s. Since his purchase, they won their first league title in 2011 and two more league titles in 2017 and 2021. Al Jazira have produced talented homegrown players such as Ali Mabkhout and Khalfan Mubarak and many others that would end up playing for the UAE national team.

== Honours ==
=== Domestic competitions ===
==== League ====
- UAE Pro League: 3
  - Champions: 2010–11, 2016–17, 2020–21
- UAE Division One: 2
  - Winners: 1982–83, 1987–88

==== Cups ====
- UAE President's Cup: 3
  - Winners: 2010–11, 2011–12, 2015–16
- UAE League Cup: 2
  - Winners: 2009–10, 2024–25
- UAE Federation Cup: 1
  - Winners: 2006–07
- UAE Super Cup: 1
  - Winners: 2021

=== Regional competitions ===
- GCC Champions League: 1
  - Winners: 2007

== Club officials ==
Position	Staff
Sporting Director	(United Arab Emirates) Islam Marzooq
Head Coach	(Romania) Cosmin Olăroiu
Assistant Coach	(England) Hamza Serrar (United Arab Emirates) Abdalla Mehmood (United Arab Emirates) Mansoor Fawaz
Goalkeeper Goach	(Morocco) Redouane Benchtioui
Fitness Coach	(England) Adil Mirza (United Arab Emirates) Yaqoob Mamoon
Performance Analyst	(India) Shaihan Asi

== Players ==
As of UAE Pro-League:

Note: Flags indicate national team as defined under FIFA eligibility rules; some limited exceptions apply. Players may hold more than one non-FIFA nationality.

No.	Pos.	Nation	Player
1	GK	TUR	Ersin Destanoğlu
2	DF	BRA	Igor Serrote
4	DF	BRA	Willyan Rocha
5	DF	UAE	Khalifa Al Hammadi
6	DF	UAE	Mohammed Al-Attas
7	MF	UAE	Abdullah Ramadan
8	MF	UAE	Mamadou Coulibaly
9	FW	COD	Simon Banza
10	FW	BRA	Malcom
14	DF	SWE	Johan Bångsbo
15	DF	UAE	Mohammed Rabii
16	DF	UAE	Marcus Meloni
17	DF	UAE	Rúben Canedo
18	MF	UAE	Ahmed Mahmoud
22	MF	SRB	Nikola Vukić
23	MF	ALB	Kristjan Asllani (on loan from Inter Milan)

No.	Pos.	Nation	Player
25	MF	BEL	Jay-Dee Geusens
28	DF	TUR	Ravil Tagir
30	MF	NGR	Anthony Dennis
39	DF	BIH	Nermin Mujkić
54	GK	UAE	Abdullah Al-Hammadi
55	GK	UAE	Ali Khasif
67	MF	CIV	Koffi Koblan
70	MF	GAM	Momodou Jatta
74	MF	TUR	Salih Malkoçoğlu
77	MF	ANG	Felício Milson
78	FW	SEN	Mamadou N'Diaye
80	FW	UAE	Bruno
81	FW	UAE	Ali Al-Memari
92	FW	MAR	Yasser Zahli
94	FW	BRA	Talisca
99	FW	BRA	Vinicius Mello

=== Out on loan ===
Note: Flags indicate national team as defined under FIFA eligibility rules; some limited exceptions apply. Players may hold more than one non-FIFA nationality.

No.	Pos.	Nation	Player
30	DF	UAE	Yousef Al-Marzouqi (on loan to Al Dhafra)
11	DF	UAE	Richard Akonnor (on loan to Göztepe)
19	MF	MLI	Oumar Traoré (on loan to Khor Fakkan Club)

Players with Multiple Nationalities

- (United Arab Emirates) (Brazil) Vinicius Mello
- (United Arab Emirates) (Brazil) Willyan Rocha
- (United Arab Emirates) (Ivory Coast) Mamadou Coulibaly
- (United Arab Emirates) (France) Elias Sagna
- (United Arab Emirates) (Pakistan) Musa Pervez Karacasia
- (United Arab Emirates) (Ghana) Richard Akonnor
- (United Arab Emirates) (Mali) Oumar Traoré
- (United Arab Emirates) (Serbia) Stojan Leković

== Former Squads ==
=== FIFA Club World Cup ===
- 2017 FIFA Club World Cup squad
- 2021 FIFA Club World Cup squad

== Managers ==
- (Brazil) Jair Pereira (1983)
- (Lebanon) Hilmy Al-Nawwal (1984–1997) administration manager
- (Russia) Nikolay Kiselyov (1989–1993)
- (Russia) Nikolay Kiselyov (1994–1995)
- (Netherlands) Chris Dekker (1995)
- (Bosnia and Herzegovina) Džemaludin Mušović (1996–1998)
- (Netherlands) Rinus Israël (1998–2000)
- (Netherlands) Jan Versleijen (2001–2003)
- (Netherlands) André Wetzel (2004)
- (Netherlands) Sef Vergoossen (2004–2005)
- (Belgium) Walter Meeuws (2005–2006)
- (France) Henri Stambouli (2006)
- (Netherlands) Jan Versleijen (2006–2007)
- (Romania) László Bölöni (2007–2008)
- (Brazil) Abel Braga (2008–2011)
- (Belgium) Franky Vercauteren (2011–12)
- (Brazil) Caio Junior (2012)
- (Brazil) Paulo Bonamigo (2012–2013)
- (Spain) Luis Milla (2013)
- (Italy) Walter Zenga (2013–2014)
- (Belgium) Eric Gerets (2014–2015)
- (Brazil) Abel Braga (2015)
- (United Arab Emirates) Ali Al-Nuaimi (2015) interim
- (Netherlands) Henk ten Cate (2015–2018)
- (Netherlands) Marcel Keizer (2018)
- (Netherlands) Damiën Hertog (2018–2019)
- (Netherlands) Jurgen Streppel (2019)
- (Netherlands) Marcel Keizer (2019–2023)
- (Netherlands) Frank de Boer (2023)
- (Netherlands) Bob de Klerk (2023–2024) caretaker
- (Romania) Mirel Rădoi (2024)
- (France) Grégory Dufrennes (2024) caretaker
- (Morocco) Hussein Ammouta (2024–2025)
- (Netherlands) (Croatia) Marino Pušić (2025–2026)
- (Romania) Cosmin Olăroiu (2026–)

== Pro-League record ==
Season	Lvl.	Tms.	Pos.	President's Cup	League Cup
2008–09	1	12	2nd	Quarter-Finals	Semi-Finals
2009–10	1	12	2nd	Semi-Finals	Champions
2010–11	1	12	1st	Champions	First Round
2011–12	1	12	4th	Champions	Semi-Finals
2012–13	1	14	3rd	Quarter-Finals	Runner-ups
2013–14	1	14	3rd	Round of 16	Runner-ups
2014–15	1	14	2nd	Round of 16	First Round
2015–16	1	14	7th	Champions	First Round
2016–17	1	14	1st	Quarter-Finals	Semi-Finals
2017–18	1	12	7th	Quarter-Finals	Quarter-Finals
2018–19	1	14	5th	Round of 16	Quarter-Finals
2019–20^{a}	1	14	3rd	Quarter-Finals	Semi-Finals
2020–21	1	14	1st	Round of 16	First Round
2021–22	1	14	4th	Quarter-Finals	Semi-Finals
2022–23	1	14	5th	Quarter-Finals	Semi-Finals
2023–24	1	14	8th	Quarter-Finals	Quarter-Finals
2024–25	1	14	7th	Semi-Finals	Champions
2025–26	1	14	4th	Runner-ups	Semi-Finals

_{Notes 2019–20 UAE football season was cancelled due to the COVID-19 pandemic in the United Arab Emirates.}

Key

- Pos. = Position
- Tms. = Number of teams
- Lvl. = League

== See also ==
- List of football clubs in the United Arab Emirates
