= Al Orooba Club =

Emirati professional football club

Al Orooba نادي العروبة
- Full name: Al Orooba Club
- Nickname: Green Duo (ثنائية الأخضر)
- Founded: 1972; 54 years ago
- Ground: Al Sharqi Stadium
- Capacity: 3,000
- Owner: Maktoum bin Hamad bin Mohammed Al-Sharqi
- Chairman: Khalifa Rashid Al-Mallahi
- Head coach: Abdulaziz Al-Hashmi (caretaker)
- League: UAE Pro League
- 2023–24: UAE First Division League, 1st of 17 (promoted)
Home colours	Away colours

Al Orooba Club (Arabic: نادي العروبة الرياضي الثقافي) is a United Arab Emirates professional football club based in the city of Mirbah and Qidfa, Fujairah. The club currently plays in the UAE First Division League.

== History ==
In 1960, two clubs were founded in Mirbah and Qidfa, Al Wehda in Mirbah and Al Najma in Qidfa, both clubs were financially weak and by 1972, both clubs agreed to merge under the name Al Urooba to represent the Mirbah-Qidfa area of the Emirate of Fujairah.

== Stadium ==
Currently the team plays at the 3000-capacity Al Sharqi Stadium.

== Honours ==
- UAE Division One
  - Champions (3): 1991–92, 2020–21, 2023–24

== Pro-League Record ==
Season	Lvl.	Tms.	Pos.	President's Cup	League Cup
2008–09	2	16	4th	Preliminary Round	—
2009–10	2	8	5th	Round of 16	—
2010–11	2	8	4th	Round of 16	—
2011–12	2	8	8th	Preliminary Round	—
2012–13	2	14	6th	Preliminary Round	—
2013–14	2	13	9th	Preliminary Round	—
2014–15	2	11	6th	Preliminary Round	—
2015–16	2	9	5th	Preliminary Round	—
2016–17	2	9	3rd	Round of 16	—
2017–18	2	12	6th	Round of 16	—
2018–19	2	10	3rd	Preliminary Round	—
2019–20^{a}	2	11	9th	Preliminary Round	—
2020–21	2	11	1st	Round of 16	—
2021–22	1	14	13th	Round of 16	First Round
2022–23	2	17	13th	Preliminary Round	—
2023–24	2	17	1st		
2024–25	1	14	1Xth		

_{Notes 2019–20 UAE football season was cancelled due to the COVID-19 pandemic in the United Arab Emirates.}

Key

- Pos. = Position
- Tms. = Number of teams
- Lvl. = League

== Current squad ==
As of UAE First Division League:

Note: Flags indicate national team as defined under FIFA eligibility rules; some limited exceptions apply. Players may hold more than one non-FIFA nationality.

No.	Pos.	Nation	Player
2	DF	UAE	Ali Abdulla Ali
3	DF	BRA	Lucas Mezenga
6	MF	CMR	Pierre Kunde
7	FW	UAE	Mohamed Al-Blooshi
8	MF	UAE	Shahin Suroor
9	FW	GUI	Ousmane Barry
10	MF	BIH	Nemanja Anđušić (on loan from Zorya Luhansk)
11	FW	BRA	Wellissol
12	GK	UAE	Humaid Al-Najjar
13	FW	NGR	Viv Solomon-Otabor
14	MF	NGR	Yusuf Olatunji
18	DF	UAE	Eisa Ahmed
19	MF	MLI	Tiécoura Traoré

No.	Pos.	Nation	Player
21	DF	UAE	Marwan Abdullah
24	DF	OMA	Hamed Al-Naaimi
28	DF	UAE	Saoud Saeed
29	FW	GAM	Babucarr Seye
30	MF	CGO	Durma Maniongui
36	MF	NGR	Damilare Salaudeen
40	GK	UAE	Abdullah Yousef
55	GK	UAE	Talal Khameis
66	DF	UAE	Ahmed Al Ali
70	MF	OMA	Khalid Al-Jabri
77	MF	BRA	Júlio Cesar
80	DF	SRB	Sinisa Jolacic
—	FW	ALB	Shefit Shefiti
—	DF	UAE	Rashed Muhayer

== Coaching staff ==
Position	Name
Head coach	(United Arab Emirates) André Jasmins (caretaker)
Assistant Coach	(United Arab Emirates) Pedro Miranda
Goalkeeper Coach	(United Arab Emirates) Miguel Matos
Fitness Coach	(United Arab Emirates) Luis Estanislau
Match Analysis	(United Arab Emirates) Marcio Rocha
Doctor	(United Arab Emirates) Abdusalam Ali
Physiotherapist	(United Arab Emirates) Fahad Al-Naqbi

== See also ==
- List of football clubs in the United Arab Emirates
