= 2019–20 Al Ain FC season =

Al Ain
2019–20 season
- President: Mohammed Bin Zayed
- Manager: Ivan Leko (from 1 June 2019) (until 21 December 2019); Pedro Emanuel (from 5 January 2020)
- Stadium: Hazza Bin Zayed Stadium
- UAE Pro-League: Cancelled
- President's Cup: Cancelled
- League Cup: Semi-finals
- Champions League: Group Stage
- Top goalscorer: League: Kodjo Laba (19 goals); All: Kodjo Laba (28 goals)
- Highest home attendance: 14,423 vs Al Jazira (1 November 2019)
- Lowest home attendance: 3,455 vs Hatta (19 October 2019)
- Average home league attendance: 7,721
Home colours	Away colours

The 2019–20 season was Al Ain Football Club's 52nd in existence and the club's 45th consecutive season in the top-level football league in the UAE.

== Squad list ==
Players and squad numbers last updated on 20 September 2019.
Note: Flags indicate national team as has been defined under FIFA eligibility rules. Players may hold more than one non-FIFA nationality.

No.	Nat.	Position	Name	Date of Birth (Age)	Signed from
Goalkeepers
1	(United Arab Emirates)	GK	Mohammed Abo Sandah	20 June 1995 (aged 24)	(United Arab Emirates) Youth system
12	(United Arab Emirates)	GK	Hamad Al-Mansouri	28 March 1996 (aged 23)	(United Arab Emirates) Youth system
17	(United Arab Emirates)	GK	Khalid Eisa	15 September 1989 (aged 30)	(United Arab Emirates) Al Jazira
Defenders
2	(United Arab Emirates)		Ali Al Haidhani	7 January 1998 (aged 21)	(United Arab Emirates) Youth system
3	(United Arab Emirates)		Salem Abdullah	17 September 1998 (aged 21)	(United Arab Emirates) Youth system
4	(United Arab Emirates)	CB	Mohammed Ali Shaker	27 July 1997 (aged 22)	(United Arab Emirates) Ajman
5	(United Arab Emirates)	CB	Ismail Ahmed	7 July 1983 (aged 36)	(United Arab Emirates) Youth system
19	(United Arab Emirates)	CB / LB	Mohanad Salem	1 March 1985 (aged 34)	(United Arab Emirates) Al Dhafra
21	(United Arab Emirates)	AM	Mohammed Hilal	10 August 1995 (aged 24)	(United Arab Emirates) Ajman
22	(United Arab Emirates)	LB	Mohammed Fayez	6 October 1989 (aged 29)	(United Arab Emirates) Youth system
23	(United Arab Emirates)	CB	Mohamed Ahmed	16 April 1989 (aged 30)	(United Arab Emirates) Al-Shabab
33	(Japan)	CB / DM	Tsukasa Shiotani	5 December 1988 (aged 30)	(Japan) Sanfrecce Hiroshima
44	(United Arab Emirates)		Saeed Juma	8 July 1998 (aged 21)	(United Arab Emirates) Youth system
53	(United Arab Emirates)		Saoud Al Abri	3 August 1999 (aged 20)	(United Arab Emirates) Youth system
Midfielders
6	(United Arab Emirates)	DM	Yahya Nader	11 September 1998 (aged 21)	(United Arab Emirates) Youth system
11	(United Arab Emirates)	RB / RW	Bandar Al-Ahbabi	9 July 1990 (aged 29)	(United Arab Emirates) Baniyas
13	(United Arab Emirates)	CM / LM / RM	Ahmed Barman	5 February 1994 (aged 25)	(United Arab Emirates) Youth system
14	(United Arab Emirates)	AM	Rayan Yaslam	23 November 1994 (aged 24)	(United Arab Emirates) Youth system
16	(United Arab Emirates)	CF / RW / LW	Mohamed Abdulrahman	4 February 1989 (aged 30)	(United Arab Emirates) Youth system
18	(United Arab Emirates)		Khalid Al-Bloushi	22 March 1999 (aged 20)	(United Arab Emirates) Youth system
20	(Serbia)		Andrija Radovanovic	15 September 2000 (aged 19)	(Slovenia) NK Domžale
24	(United Arab Emirates)		Falah Waleed	13 September 1998 (aged 21)	(United Arab Emirates) Youth system
26	(France)	AM	Omar Yaisien	8 May 2000 (aged 19)	(France) Paris Saint-Germain II
27	(United Arab Emirates)		Mohsen Abdullah	13 April 1995 (aged 24)	(United Arab Emirates) Youth system
28	(France)	CM	Idriss Mzaouiyani	15 January 2000 (aged 19)	(France) Paris Saint-Germain II
Forwards
7	(Brazil)	FW / AM	Caio Canedo	9 August 1990 (aged 29)	(United Arab Emirates) Al Wasl
9	(Togo)	CF	Kodjo Laba	27 January 1992 (aged 27)	(Morocco) RS Berkane
30	(United Arab Emirates)	FW	Mohammed Khalvan	28 August 1998 (aged 21)	(United Arab Emirates) Youth system
99	(United Arab Emirates)	FW	Jamal Maroof	23 September 1991 (aged 27)	(United Arab Emirates) Al Sharjah

== Pre-season ==
4 August 2019 Friendly	Al-Ettifaq (Saudi Arabia)	2–0	(United Arab Emirates) Al Ain	Gornja Radgona, Slovenia
18:30 CEST	Rogerinho 65'; Kiss 90' (pen.)	Report		Stadium: Gornja Radgona Stadium

== Competitions ==
=== Overview ===
Competition	Record								Started round	Final position / round	First match	Last match
Competition	G	W	D	L	GF	GA	GD	Win %	Started round	Final position / round	First match	Last match
Pro-League	19	11	4	4	46	21	+25	57.89	—N/a	Cancelled	20 September 2019	14 March 2020
President's Cup	3	3	0	0	11	7	+4	100.00	Final	Cancelled	23 December 2019	10 March 2020
League Cup	8	4	3	1	16	10	+6	50.00	Group stage	Semi-finals	23 August 2019	10 January 2020
Champions League	7	2	2	3	6	13	−7	28.57	Play-off round	Group Stage	28 January 2020	24 September 2020
Total	37	20	9	8	79	51	+28	54.05	—N/a	—N/a	23 August 2019	24 September 2020

Updated to match played 24 September 2020
Source: Competitions

== League table ==
Pos	Team	Pld	W	D	L	GF	GA	GD	Pts	Qualification or relegation
1	Shabab Al Ahli	19	13	4	2	42	13	+29	43	Qualification for AFC Champions League group stage
2	Al Ain	19	11	4	4	46	21	+25	37	Qualification for AFC Champions League play-off round
3	Al Jazira	19	11	3	5	29	17	+12	36	
4	Sharjah	19	10	5	4	38	23	+15	35	Qualification for AFC Champions League group stage
5	Al Wahda	19	11	2	6	31	29	+2	35	Qualification for AFC Champions League play-off round

Source: Arabian Gulf League
Rules for classification: 1) points; 2) head-to-head goal difference; 3) head-to-head goals scored; 4) head-to-head away goals scored; 5) goal difference; 6) number of goals scored; 7) number of away goals scored; 8) head-to-head points; 9) fair play ranking 10) draw

=== Results summary ===
Overall								Home						Away					
Pld	W	D	L	GF	GA	GD	Pts	W	D	L	GF	GA	GD	W	D	L	GF	GA	GD
19	11	4	4	46	21	+25	37	4	3	2	17	11	+6	7	1	2	29	10	+19

Last updated: 14 March 2020.
Source: Competitive matches

=== Results by round ===
Round	1	2	3	4	5	6	7	8	9	10	11	12	13	14	15	16	17	18	19	20	21	22	23	24	25	26
Ground	H	A	A	H	A	H	A	H	A	H	A	H	A	H	H	A	A	H	A	×	×	×	×	×	×	×
Result	W	W	L	W	W	D	D	D	W	L	W	L	W	W	D	W	W	W	L	×	×	×	×	×	×	×
Position	4	3	4	3	2	3	3	3	3	4	4	5	2	2	4	2	2	2	2	2	2	2	2	2	2	2

Updated to match(es) played on 14 March 2020. Source: Competitive matches
A = Away; H = Home; W = Win; D = Draw; L = Loss

=== Matches ===
Win Draw Loss

20 September 2019 Round 1	Al Ain	3–2	Kalba	Al Ain
18:45	Kodjo Laba 8'; Jamal Ibrahim 54'; Saeed Jumaa 90+6'	Soccerway report	Peniel Mlapa 19', 83'; Dzsudzsák (yellow card) 59'; Al-Zaabi (yellow card) 86'	Stadium: Hazza bin Zayed Stadium; Attendance: 5,285; Referee: Ahmed Eisa Mohamed

26 September 2019 Round 2	Al Wasl	1–3	Al Ain	Zabeel, Dubai
21:15	Welliton 15'; Al-Bloushi (yellow card) 46'; Saleh (yellow card) 79'	Soccerway report	Shiotani 18'; Al-Ahbabi 61'; Kodjo Laba 69'	Stadium: Zabeel Stadium; Attendance: 8,123; Referee: Hamad Ali Yousef

3 October 2019 Round 3	Sharjah	3–2	Al Ain	Sharjah City
21:15	Coronado 11' (pen.), 83'; Abdulrahman (yellow card) 56'; Salem Sultan 90+1'; Al-Hosani (yellow card) 90+7'	Soccerway report	Al-Ahbabi 41'; Kodjo Laba 52'; Radovanovic (yellow card) 87'	Stadium: Sharjah Stadium; Attendance: 9,858; Referee: Ammar Ali Abdulla Jumaa Al Junaibi

19 October 2019 Round 4	Al Ain	2–1	Hatta	Al Ain
18:30	Caio 42' (pen.); Kodjo Laba 82'	Soccerway report	Valente 66'	Stadium: Hazza bin Zayed Stadium; Attendance: 3,455; Referee: Mohomed Obaid Khadim Mohd

25 October 2019 Round 5	Fujairah	1–7	Al Ain	Fujairah
18:15	Yao (yellow card) 32'; Jhonnattann 39'; Sebil (yellow card) 90'	Soccerway report	Kodjo Laba 42', 57', 68', 87'; Mohanad Salem 53'; Caio 66'; Jamal Ibrahim 80'	Stadium: Fujairah Club Stadium; Attendance: 1,378; Referee: Yahya Al Mulla

1 November 2019 Round 6	Al Ain	0–0	Al Jazira	Al Ain
20:45	Shaker (red card) 13'; Al-Ahbabi (yellow card) 14'	Soccerway report	Obaid (yellow card) 90+5'	Stadium: Hazza bin Zayed Stadium; Attendance: 14,423; Referee: Ahmad Salem Khalfan

7 November 2019 Round 7	Baniyas	0–0	Al Ain	Al Shamkha, Abu Dhabi
18:00	João Victor (yellow card) 26' (yellow-red card) 55'; Al-Otaibah (yellow card) 81'	Soccerway report	Abdulrahman (yellow card) 64'	Stadium: Baniyas Stadium; Attendance: 3,667; Referee: Mohamed Abdulla Hassan Mohd

11 December 2019 Round 8	Al Ain	2–2	Al Nasr	Al Ain
20:30	Nader (yellow card) 10'; Kodjo Laba 42' (pen.); Caio 45+3'; Fayez (yellow card) 61' (yellow-red card) 90+5'	Soccerway report	Pavez (yellow card) 9'; Saeed (yellow card) 34'; Shambih (yellow card) 40'; Tozé 54', 90+6' (pen.); Hazza Salem (yellow card) 76'; Kuwas (yellow card) 81'; Khamis (yellow card) 90+6'	Stadium: Hazza bin Zayed Stadium; Referee: Ahmed Eisa Mohamed

15 December 2019 Round 9	Ajman	1–4	Al Ain	Ajman
18:00	Ismail Ahmed 3' (o.g.); Bin Yousef (yellow card) 42'; Vander (yellow card) 64'	Soccerway report	Meziane 28'; Mohanad Salem 44'; Caio 55'; Jamal Ibrahim 90+5'	Stadium: Sheikh Rashid Bin Saeed Stadium; Referee: Mohomed Obaid Khadim Mohd

19 December 2019 Round 10	Al Ain	1–2	Al Dhafra	Al Ain
18:00	Mohammed Jamal (yellow card) 29'; Shiotani (yellow card) 32'; Caio 51' (pen.); Yaisien (yellow card) 73'; Ismail Ahmed (yellow card) 85'; Abdulrahman (yellow card) 90+5'	Soccerway report	Ibrahim Saeed (yellow card) 13'; Diego Jardel 27' (pen.); João Pedro 60'; Al-Zaabi (yellow card) 82'; Al-Marzouqi (yellow card) 90+8'	Stadium: Hazza bin Zayed Stadium; Referee: Yahya Almulla

28 December 2019 Round 11	Al Wahda	0–2	Al Ain	Al Nahyan, Abu Dhabi
20:30	Tagliabué (yellow card) 85'; Abdullah El Refaey (yellow card) 88'; Saleh (yellow card) 90+1'	Soccerway report	Abdullah El Refaey 42' (o.g.); Shaker (yellow card) 57'; Nader (yellow card) 62'; Jamal Ibrahim (yellow card) 71'; Kodjo Laba 90+4' (yellow card) 90+6'	Stadium: Al Nahyan Stadium; Referee: Hamad Ali Yousef

2 January 2020 Round 12	Al Ain	1–2	Shabab Al Ahli	Al Ain
20:45	Shiotani 50'	Soccerway report	Khalil 60' (pen.); Abdulla 80'	Stadium: Hazza bin Zayed Stadium; Referee: Ahmed Eisa Mohamed

23 January 2020 Round 13	Khor Fakkan	0–3	Al Ain	Sharjah
17:30		Soccerway report	Kodjo Laba 4' (pen.), 19'; Al-Ahbabi 51'	Stadium: Khalid bin Mohammed Stadium; Referee: Mohomed Obaid Khadim Mohd

1 February 2020 Round 14	Al Ain	5–0	Al Wasl	Al Ain
19:00	Abdulrahman 3', 9'; Kodjo Laba 54', 85'; Abdullah (yellow card) 48' (yellow-red card) 65'; Ibrahim 90+4'	Soccerway report		Stadium: Hazza bin Zayed Stadium; Referee: Sultan Mohamed

7 February 2020 Round 15	Al Ain	1–1	Sharjah	Al Ain
16:00	Kodjo Laba 86'	Soccerway report	Caio 2'	Stadium: Hazza bin Zayed Stadium; Referee: Mohamed Abdulla Hassan Mohd

14 February 2020 Round 16	Kalba	1–4	Al Ain	Kalba
17:30	Mlapa 20'	Soccerway report	Yaisien 17'; Kodjo Laba 43'; Dzsudzsák 71'; Caio 90+3'	Stadium: Ittihad Kalba Stadium; Referee: Omar Mohamed Al Ali

27 February 2020 Round 17	Hatta	0–3	Al Ain	Hatta
17:30	Lahej Al-Nofali (yellow card) 72'; Al-Hosani (yellow card) 75'	Soccerway report	Salem Abdullah (yellow card) 41'; Barman (yellow card) 45+1'; Al-Ahbabi 50'; Ibrahim 68', 88'	Stadium: Hamdan Bin Rashid Stadium; Referee: Ahmad Salem Khalfan

5 March 2020 Round 18	Al Ain	2–1	Fujairah	Al Ain
17:30	Ibrahim 56'; Kodjo Laba 77' (pen.); Barman (yellow card) 84'	Soccerway report	Asante 3'; Al Zeyoudi (yellow card) 81'	Stadium: Hazza bin Zayed Stadium; Attendance: 0 (close doors); Referee: Mohomed Obaid Khadim Mohd
Note: due to coronavirus outbreak, United Arab Emirates Football Association decided to be all matches played behind closed doors.

14 March 2020 Round 19	Al Jazira	3–1	Al Ain	Al Nahyan, Abu Dhabi
16:00	Abdulrahman 43'; Kosanović (yellow card) 72'; Keno 82'; Faisel (yellow card) 90'; Mabkhout 90+4'	Soccerway report	Kodjo Laba 39'; Al-Ahbabi (yellow card) 57' (yellow-red card) 69'	Stadium: Mohammed bin Zayed Stadium; Attendance: 0 (close doors); Referee: Mohamed Abdulla Hassan Mohd
Note: due to coronavirus outbreak, United Arab Emirates Football Association decided to be all matches played behind closed doors.

19 March 2020 Round 20	Al Ain	Cancelled	Baniyas	Al Ain
16:00		Soccerway report		Stadium: Hazza bin Zayed Stadium

4 April 2020 Round 21	Al Nasr	Cancelled	Al Ain	Al Nasr, Dubai
20:45		Soccerway report		Stadium: Al Maktoum Stadium

Round 22	Cancelled

Round 23	Cancelled

Round 24	Cancelled

Round 25	Cancelled

Round 26	Cancelled

== President's Cup ==
23 December 2019 Round of 16	Dibba Al Hisn	0–2	Al Ain	Dubai
16:50		Report	Jamal Ibrahim 41'; Caio 45+1'; Abdulrahman (yellow card) 49'; Shiotani (yellow card) 84'	Stadium: Al Maktoum Stadium

21 February 2020 Quarter-finals	Al Ain	6–5	Al Wasl	Abu Dhabi
17:30	K. Laba 3', 37' (pen.), 73', 85'; Caio 60', 67'	Report	Welliton 9'; Dwubeng 45', 66' (red card) 83'; F. Lima 55' (pen.), 90+7' (pen.)	Stadium: Al Nahyan Stadium; Referee: Ammar Al Junaibi

10 March 2020 Semi-finals	Sharjah	2–3	Al Ain	Abu Dhabi
20:40	Marcos Meloni 12'; Caio 42'	Report	Dzsudzsák 4'; Islamkhan 32'; Caio Canedo 38'	Stadium: Mohammed bin Zayed Stadium; Attendance: 0 (close doors); Referee: Hamad Ali Yousef
Note: due to coronavirus outbreak, United Arab Emirates Football Association decided to be all matches played behind closed doors.

Final	Al Ain	Cancelled	Al Dhafra	Abu Dhabi
				Stadium: Zayed Sports City Stadium

== League Cup ==
=== Group A ===
Team	Pld	W	D	L	GF	GA	GD	Pts
Al Ain	6	3	2	1	13	8	+5	11
Shabab Al Ahli	6	3	2	1	9	4	+5	11
Al Nasr	6	2	2	2	6	5	+1	8
Al Jazira	6	2	1	3	5	10	−5	7 (Note: Al Jazira are ahead of Khor Fakkan and Al Dhafra on head-to-head points: Al Jazira 6, Khor Fakkan 1, Al Dhafra 1.)
Khor Fakkan	6	1	4	1	5	5	0	7
Al Dhafra	6	2	1	3	5	7	−2	7
Kalba	6	1	2	3	5	9	−4	5

Source: scorespro.com
Notes:

23 August 2019 Matchday 1	Al Ain	2–2	Shabab Al Ahli	Al Ain
19:15	Kodjo 6' (pen.), 80' (pen.) (yellow card) 83'; Radovanovic (yellow card) 13'; Juma (yellow card) 34'; Al-Ahbabi (yellow card) 84'; Shaker (yellow card) 90+4'; Barman (yellow card) 90+5'	Report	Salem Ali (yellow card) 5'; Mariani (yellow card) 52'; Henrique Luvannor 64'; Haikal (yellow card) 66'; Naser (yellow card) 81'; Ahmed Khalil 90+5' (pen.)	Stadium: Hazza bin Zayed Stadium; Referee: Mohomed Obaid Khadim Mohd

6 September 2019 Matchday 2	Al Jazira	0–3	Al Ain	Abu Dhabi City
21:15	Idriss (yellow card) 12'	Report	Salem Abdullah (yellow card) 28'; Amer Abdulrahman 39' (o.g.); Caio 48'; Mzaouiyani (yellow card) 83'; Jamal Ibrahim 90+4'	Stadium: Mohammed bin Zayed Stadium; Referee: Omar Mohamed Al Ali

11 October 2019 Matchday 3	Al Ain	3–1	Al Nasr	Al Ain
20:45	Jamal Ibrahim 13', 53'; Abdulrahman (yellow card) 24'; Shiotani (yellow card) 27'; Caio 45'	Report	Gláuber (yellow card) 36' (red card) 42'; Gabriel Valentini 86' (yellow card) 89'	Stadium: Hazza bin Zayed Stadium; Referee: Ahmad Salem Khalfan

16 November 2019 Matchday 4	Al Dhafra	0–2	Al Ain	Madinat Zayed
17:00	Ibrahim Saeed (yellow card) 48'	Report	Caio 32'; Masoud Sulaiman 86' (o.g.)	Stadium: Al Dhafra Stadium; Referee: Yaqoub Al Hammadi

23 November 2019 Matchday 5	Al Ain	1–1	Kalba	Al Ain
17:00	Waleed (yellow card) 2'; Jamal Ibrahim 39'	Report	Majed Rashed 45+4'; Nasser (yellow card) 73'; Dzsudzsák (yellow card) 84'	Stadium: Sheikh Khalifa International Stadium; Referee: Omar Mohamed Al Ali

28 November 2019 Matchday 6	Khor Fakkan	4–2	Al Ain	Kalba
17:00	Bismark 41' (pen.), 88'; Dodô 48'; Malallah 55'; Yousif (yellow card) 90+1'; Al-Yassi (yellow card) 90+3'	Report	Omar Yaisien 15'; Salem Abdullah (yellow card) 35'; Abdulrahman 36'; Ismail Ahmed (yellow card) 85'	Stadium: Ittihad Kalba Stadium; Referee: Yahya Al Mulla

=== Knockout stage ===
6 December 2019 Quarter-finals	Al Ain	2–1	Sharjah	Al Ain
17:00	Ismail Ahmed (yellow card) 7'; Kodjo Laba 28'; Mohamed Abdulrahman 87'; Yahya Nader (yellow card) 90+2'; Khalid Eisa (yellow card) 90+5'	Report	Igor Coronado 8' (pen.); Majed Suroor (yellow card) 69'	Stadium: Hazza bin Zayed Stadium; Referee: Hamad Ali Yousef

10 January 2020 Semi-finals	Al Ain	1–1 (1–4 p)	Al Nasr	Al Ain
20:45	Mahmoud Khamees 26' (o.g.)	Report	Tozé 82'	Stadium: Hazza bin Zayed Stadium; Referee: Adel Al Naqbi
	Penalties
	Jamal Ibrahim (penalty missed); Caio (penalty missed); Kodjo Fo-Doh Laba (penalty scored)		(penalty scored) Tozé; (penalty scored) Álvaro Negredo; (penalty scored) Brandley Kuwas; (penalty scored) Tareq Ahmed

== 2020 AFC Champions League ==
=== Play-off round ===
28 January 2020	Al-Ain (United Arab Emirates)	1–0	(Uzbekistan) Bunyodkor	Al Ain
18:40 UTC+4	Juma 78'	Report		Stadium: Hazza Bin Zayed Stadium; Attendance: 4,424; Referee: Ko Hyung-jin (South Korea)

=== Group stage ===
==== Group D ====
Pos	Team	Pld	W	D	L	GF	GA	GD	Pts	Qualification	NAS	SAD	SEP	AIN
1	(Saudi Arabia) Al-Nassr	6	3	2	1	9	5	+4	11	Advance to knockout stage	—	2–2	2–0	0–1
2	(Qatar) Al-Sadd	6	2	3	1	14	8	+6	9	Advance to knockout stage	1–1	—	3–0	4–0
3	(Iran) Sepahan	6	2	1	3	6	8	−2	7		0–2	2–1	—	0–0
4	(United Arab Emirates) Al-Ain	6	1	2	3	5	13	−8	5		1–2	3–3	0–4	—

Source: AFC
Rules for classification: Tiebreakers

11 February 2020 Matchday 1	Al-Ain (United Arab Emirates)	0–4	(Iran) Sepahan	Al Ain
17:50 UTC+4	Salem Abdullah (yellow card) 34'; Saeed Jumaa (yellow card) 67'	Report	Mohebi 38'; Kiros 46'; Rafiei 52'; Tayyebi 78'	Stadium: Hazza bin Zayed Stadium; Attendance: 7,028; Referee: Hiroyuki Kimura (Japan)

18 February 2020 Matchday 2	Al-Ain (United Arab Emirates)	1–2	(Saudi Arabia) Al-Nassr	Al Ain
17:55 UTC+4	Yaisien 18'; Barman (yellow card) 28'; M. Ahmed (yellow card) 56'	Report	M. Ali 57'; Al-Obaid (yellow card) 65'; Hamadallah 80'; Amrabat (yellow card) 83'; Giuliano (yellow card) 87'	Stadium: Hazza bin Zayed Stadium; Attendance: 7,326; Referee: Nawaf Shukralla (Bahrain)

15 September 2020 Matchday 3	Al-Ain (United Arab Emirates)	3–3	(Qatar) Al-Sadd	Doha
18:00 UTC+3	Laba 5'; Islamkhan 38'; Khoukhi 67' (o.g.)	Report	Afif 35'; Cazorla 55'; Bounedjah 60'	Stadium: Jassim bin Hamad Stadium; Attendance: 0 Referee: Hettikamkanamge Perera (Sri Lanka)

18 September 2020 Matchday 4	Al-Sadd (Qatar)	4–0	(United Arab Emirates) Al-Ain	Doha
21:00 UTC+3	Bounedjah 26', 70'; Afif 56'; Tabata 86'	Report		Stadium: Jassim bin Hamad Stadium; Attendance: 0 Referee: Mohd Amirul Izwan Yaacob (Malaysia)

21 September 2020 Matchday 5	Sepahan (Iran)	0–0	(United Arab Emirates) Al-Ain	Doha
21:00 UTC+3		Report		Stadium: Jassim bin Hamad Stadium; Attendance: 0 Referee: Ali Shaban (Kuwait)

24 September 2020 Matchday 6	Al-Nassr (Saudi Arabia)	0–1	(United Arab Emirates) Al-Ain	Doha
18:00 UTC+3		Report	Laba 19'	Stadium: Education City Stadium; Attendance: 0 Referee: Hussein Abo Yehia (Lebanon)

== Squad information ==
=== Playing statistics ===
As of 28 December 2019

No.	Pos	Nat	Player	Total		Pro-League		President's Cup		League Cup		Champions League	
No.	Pos	Nat	Player	Apps	Goals	Apps	Goals	Apps	Goals	Apps	Goals	Apps	Goals
Goalkeepers
1	GK	(United Arab Emirates) UAE	Mohammed Abo Sandah	5	0	0	0	0	0	5	0	0	0
12	GK	(United Arab Emirates) UAE	Hamad Al-Mansouri	0	0	0	0	0	0	0	0	0	0
17	GK	(United Arab Emirates) UAE	Khalid Eisa	14	0	11	0	1	0	2	0	0	0
Defenders
2	DF	(United Arab Emirates) UAE	Ali Al Haidhani	4	0	0	0	0	0	4	0	0	0
3	DF	(United Arab Emirates) UAE	Salem Abdullah	7	0	1	0	1	0	5	0	0	0
4	DF	(United Arab Emirates) UAE	Mohammed Ali Shaker	8	0	6	0	1	0	1	0	0	0
5	DF	(United Arab Emirates) UAE	Ismail Ahmed	15	0	9	0	0	0	6	0	0	0
19	DF	(United Arab Emirates) UAE	Mohanad Salem	9	2	6	2	1	0	2	0	0	0
21	DF	(United Arab Emirates) UAE	Mohammed Hilal	4	0	0	0	1	0	3	0	0	0
22	DF	(United Arab Emirates) UAE	Mohammed Fayez	5	0	3	0	0	0	2	0	0	0
23	DF	(United Arab Emirates) UAE	Mohamed Ahmed	3	0	0	0	1	0	2	0	0	0
33	DF	(Japan) JPN	Tsukasa Shiotani	18	1	11	1	1	0	6	0	0	0
44	DF	(United Arab Emirates) UAE	Saeed Juma	19	1	11	1	1	0	7	0	0	0
53	DF	(United Arab Emirates) UAE	Saoud Al Abri	0	0	0	0	0	0	0	0	0	0
Midfielders
6	MF	(Egypt) EGY	Yahia Nader	14	0	10	0	0	0	4	0	0	0
11	MF	(United Arab Emirates) UAE	Bandar Al-Ahbabi	11	2	9	2	0	0	2	0	0	0
13	MF	(United Arab Emirates) UAE	Ahmed Barman	8	0	6	0	0	0	2	0	0	0
14	MF	(United Arab Emirates) UAE	Rayan Yaslam	0	0	0	0	0	0	0	0	0	0
16	MF	(United Arab Emirates) UAE	Mohamed Abdulrahman	15	2	10	0	1	0	4	2	0	0
18	MF	(United Arab Emirates) UAE	Khalid Al-Bloushi	4	0	2	0	0	0	2	0	0	0
20	MF	(Serbia) SRB	Andrija Radovanovic	9	0	5	0	0	0	4	0	0	0
24	MF	(United Arab Emirates) UAE	Falah Waleed	11	0	6	0	1	0	4	0	0	0
26	MF	(Egypt) EGY	Omar Yaisien	10	1	5	0	0	0	5	1	0	0
27	MF	(United Arab Emirates) UAE	Mohsen Abdullah	3	0	0	0	0	0	3	0	0	0
28	MF	(France) FRA	Idriss Mzaouiyani	8	0	5	0	0	0	3	0	0	0
Forwards
7	FW	(Brazil) BRA	Caio Canedo	14	9	8	6	1	0	5	3	0	0
9	FW	(Togo) TOG	Kodjo Laba	14	13	10	10	0	0	4	3	0	0
30	FW	(United Arab Emirates) UAE	Mohammed Khalvan	4	0	2	0	0	0	2	0	0	0
50	FW	(United Arab Emirates) UAE	Mohammed Jamal	2	0	1	0	1	0	0	0	0	0
77	FW	(United Arab Emirates) UAE	Ali Eid	2	0	1	0	1	0	0	0	0	0
99	FW	(United Arab Emirates) UAE	Jamal Maroof	19	7	11	3	1	0	7	4	0	0
Players transferred out during the season
8	MF	(Algeria) ALG	Abderrahmane Meziane	6	1	4	1	0	0	2	0	0	0

Last updated: 8 June 2019
Source: fr.soccerway.com

=== Goalscorers ===
Includes all competitive matches. The list is sorted alphabetically by surname when total goals are equal.

No.	Nat.	Player	Pos.	PL	PC	LC	CL 1	TOTAL
9	(Togo)	Kodjo Laba	FW	19	4	3	2	28
7	(Brazil)	Caio Canedo	FW	6	1	3	0	10
99	(United Arab Emirates)	Jamal Maroof	FW	3	1	4	0	8
11	(United Arab Emirates)	Bandar Al-Ahbabi	MF	2	0	0	0	2
16	(United Arab Emirates)	Mohamed Abdulrahman	MF	0	0	2	0	2
19	(United Arab Emirates)	Mohanad Salem	DF	2	0	0	0	2
26	(United Arab Emirates)	Omar Yaisien	MF	0	0	1	0	1
44	(United Arab Emirates)	Saeed Juma	DF	1	0	0	0	1
8	(Algeria)	Abderrahmane Meziane	MF	1	0	0	0	1
33	(Japan)	Tsukasa Shiotani	DF	1	0	0	0	1
Own Goals				1	0	2	0	3
Totals				27	2	15	0	44

=== Assists ===
No.	Nat.	Player	Pos.	PL	PC	LC	CL 1	TOTAL
11	(United Arab Emirates)	Bandar Al-Ahbabi	MF	6	0	1	0	7
8	(Algeria)	Abderrahmane Meziane	MF	2	0	1	0	3
9	(Togo)	Kodjo Laba	FW	3	0	0	0	3
16	(United Arab Emirates)	Mohamed Abdulrahman	MF	2	0	0	0	2
7	(Brazil)	Caio Canedo	FW	1	0	1	0	2
33	(Japan)	Tsukasa Shiotani	DF	2	0	0	0	2
3	(United Arab Emirates)	Salem Abdullah	DF	0	0	2	0	2
4	(United Arab Emirates)	Mohammed Ali Shaker	DF	1	0	0	0	1
5	(United Arab Emirates)	Ismail Ahmed	DF	1	0	0	0	1
99	(United Arab Emirates)	Jamal Maroof	FW	1	0	0	0	1
26	(Egypt)	Omar Yaisien	MF	0	0	1	0	1
30	(United Arab Emirates)	Mohammed Khalvan	FW	0	0	1	0	1
18	(United Arab Emirates)	Khalid Al-Bloushi	MF	1	0	0	0	1
6	(Egypt)	Yahya Nader	MF	1	0	0	0	1
Totals				21	0	7	0	28

=== Clean sheets ===
Includes all competitive matches.

No.	Nat	Name	PL	PC	LC	CL 1	Total
1	(United Arab Emirates)	Mohammed Abo Sandah	0	0	2	0	2
12	(United Arab Emirates)	Hamad Al-Mansouri	0	0	0	0	0
17	(United Arab Emirates)	Khalid Eisa	3	1	0	0	4
		TOTALS	3	1	2	0	6

=== Hat-tricks ===
Player	Against	Result	Date	Competition	Ref
(Togo) Kodjo Laba^{4}	Fujairah	1–7 (A)	25 October 2019	UAE Pro League	
(Togo) Kodjo Laba^{4}	Al Wasl	6–5 (H)	21 February 2020	President's Cup	

(H) – Home; (A) – Away

== Transfers ==
=== In ===
Date	Pos	Player	From club	Transfer fee	Source
5 June 2019	FW	(Brazil) Caio Canedo	(United Arab Emirates) Al Wasl	€5.34m	
12 June 2019	DF	(United Arab Emirates) Mohammed Hilal	(United Arab Emirates) Ajman Club	Free transfer	
12 June 2019	MF	(United Arab Emirates) Mohammed Jamal	(United Arab Emirates) Al Jazira	Free transfer	
13 June 2019	FW	(Togo) Kodjo Laba	(Morocco) RS Berkane	Free transfer	
13 June 2019	ST	(Algeria) Abderrahmane Meziane	(Algeria) USM Alger	Free transfer	
29 June 2019	MF	(United Arab Emirates) Mohammed Shaker	(United Arab Emirates) Ajman Club	Free transfer	
22 August 2019	MF	(Serbia) Andrija Radovanovic	(Slovenia) NK Domžale	Free transfer	
1 September 2019	MF	(France) Idriss Mzaouiyani	(France) Paris Saint-Germain II	Free transfer	
1 September 2019	MF	(France) Omar Yaisien	(France) Paris Saint-Germain II	Free transfer	
31 January 2020	MF	(Kazakhstan) Bauyrzhan Islamkhan	(Kazakhstan) Kairat	Free transfer	
3 February 2020	DF	(Brazil) Rafael Pereira	(Portugal) Vila FC	Free transfer	
8 February 2020	MF	(Hungary) Balázs Dzsudzsák	(United Arab Emirates) Ittihad Kalba	Free transfer	

=== Out ===
Date	Pos	Player	To club	Type	Fee	Source
23 February 2019	MF	(Colombia) Danilo Asprilla	(Saudi Arabia) Al Shabab	End of contract	Free	
27 May 2019	MF	(Brazil) Caio Lucas Fernandes	(Portugal) Benfica	End of contract	Free	
13 July 2019	FW	(Sweden) Marcus Berg	(Russia) Krasnodar	End of contract	Free	
July 2019	DF	(United Arab Emirates) Khaled Abdulrahman		End of contract		
16 July 2019	MF	(United Arab Emirates) Ibrahim Diaky		End of contract		
8 August 2019	MF	(United Arab Emirates) Amer Abdulrahman	(United Arab Emirates) Al Jazira	End of contract	Free	
18 January 2020	FW	(Algeria) Abderrahmane Meziane	(Tunisia) Espérance de Tunis	Transfer	€900k	
25 January 2020	MF	(Serbia) Andrija Radovanovic	(United Arab Emirates) Ittihad Kalba	Loan	Undisclosed	
