= 2020–21 Al Ain FC season =

Al Ain
2020–21 season
- President: Mohammed Bin Zayed
- Manager: Pedro Emanuel (from 5 January 2020 until 11 May 2021)
- Stadium: Hazza Bin Zayed Stadium
- UAE Pro-League: 6th
- President's Cup: Round of 16
- League Cup: First round
- Champions League: Play-off round
- Top goalscorer: League: Kodjo Laba (13 goals); All: Kodjo Laba (13 goals)
- Biggest win: 0–4 vs Al Wahda; 4–1 vs Al Dhafra; 3–1 vs Fujairah
- Biggest defeat: 4–1 vs Baniyas; 1–4 vs Shabab Al Ahli; 2–4 vs Khor Fakkan; 1–3 vs Al Nasr; 4–0 vs Foolad
| Home colours | Away colours |
- All statistics correct as of 11 May 2021.

The 2020–21 season was Al Ain Football Club's 53rd in existence and the club's 46th consecutive season in the top-level football league in the UAE.

== Club ==
=== Technical staff ===
On 4 November 2020, Al Ain announced appointing David Platt as the Sports Director. On 13 December 2020, Goncalo Bexiga appointed as the Club’s Head of Scouting from Benfica in line with the improvement procedures adopted by the Al Ain Football Club Company to boost the key performance indicators at all levels, from First Team to Academy.

| Position | Name |
|---|---|
| Head coach | (Portugal) Pedro Emanuel |
| Assistant coach | (Portugal) Rui Gomes |
| Fitness coach | (Brazil) André Galve |
| Goalkeeping coach | (Portugal) Luis Miguel |
| First team technical analyst | (Portugal) Virgilio Fernandes |
| Physiotherapist | (Portugal) Fabio Santos |
| U-21 team head coach | (Iraq) Ghazi Fahad |
| Team Manager | (United Arab Emirates) Matar Obaid Al Sahbani |
| Team Supervisor | (United Arab Emirates) Mohammed Obeid Hammad |
| Team Administrator | (United Arab Emirates) Essam Abdulla |
| Director of football | (United Arab Emirates) Sultan Rashed |
| Sports Director | (England) David Platt |
| Head Scout | (Portugal) Goncalo Bexiga |

Last updated: 21 March 2021

=== Board of directors ===
| Office | Name |
|---|---|
| President | (United Arab Emirates) Mohammed Bin Zayed Al Nahyan |
| Vice President | (United Arab Emirates) Hazza Bin Zayed Al Nahyan |
| Chairman of Board of Directors | (United Arab Emirates) Matar Al Darmaki |
| Vice Chairman of Board of Directors | (United Arab Emirates) Khaled Al Dhaheri |
| Board of Directors Member | (United Arab Emirates) Matar Al Dhaheri |
| Board of Directors Member | (United Arab Emirates) Salem Al Jneibi |
| Board of Directors Member | (United Arab Emirates) Majid Al Owais |

Last updated: 22 June 2019
Source: Al Ain Club

=== Kits ===
| Home | Away |

Supplier: Nike / Sponsor: First Dubai Bank

On 15 October 2020, Al Ain reveals new Nike home and away kits that was inspired by the team’s most ground-breaking win in 2003.

== Players ==
=== First Team ===
| No | Position | Nation | Player | Age | Since | Ends | Notes |
|---|---|---|---|---|---|---|---|
| 1 | GK | (United Arab Emirates) | Mohammed Abo Sandah | 31 | 2014 | 2024 | |
| 3 | DF | (United Arab Emirates) | Salem Abdullah | 28 | 2018 | 2024 | |
| 4 | DF | (United Arab Emirates) | Mohammed Shaker | 29 | 2019 | 2024 | |
| 5 | DF | (United Arab Emirates) | Ismail Ahmed (captain) | 43 | 2008 | 2024 | Second nationality: Morocco |
| 6 | MF | (United Arab Emirates) | Yahia Nader | 28 | 2018 | 2021 | Second nationality: Egypt |
| 7 | FW | (United Arab Emirates) | Caio Canedo | 36 | 2019 | 2022 | Second nationality: Brazil |
| 9 | FW | (Togo) | Kodjo Laba | 34 | 2019 | 2024 | |
| 11 | MF | (United Arab Emirates) | Bandar Al-Ahbabi (3rd captain) | 36 | 2016 | 2024 | |
| 12 | GK | (United Arab Emirates) | Hamad Al-Mansouri | 30 | 2017 | 2021 | |
| 13 | MF | (United Arab Emirates) | Ahmed Barman | 32 | 2013 | 2024 | |
| 15 | DF | (Brazil) | Erik Menezes | 25 | 2020 | 2023 | |
| 16 | MF | (United Arab Emirates) | Mohamed Abdulrahman (vice-captain) | 37 | 2008 | 2023 | |
| 17 | GK | (United Arab Emirates) | Khalid Eisa (4th captain) | 37 | 2013 | 2024 | |
| 18 | MF | (United Arab Emirates) | Khalid Al-Balochi | 27 | 2018 | | |
| 19 | DF | (United Arab Emirates) | Mohanad Salem | 41 | 2008 | 2021 | |
| 20 | FW | (Angola) | Wilson Eduardo | 36 | 2020 | 2022 | Second nationality: Portugal |
| 21 | MF | (United Arab Emirates) | Mohammed Hilal | 31 | 2019 | 2024 | |
| 22 | MF | (Japan) | Shoya Nakajima | 32 | 2021 | 2021 | |
| 23 | DF | (United Arab Emirates) | Mohamed Ahmed | 37 | 2012 | 2024 | |
| 26 | MF | (Egypt) | Omar Yaisien | 26 | 2019 | 2022 | Second nationality: France |
| 27 | MF | (United Arab Emirates) | Mohsen Abdullah | 31 | 2016 | 2024 | |
| 30 | MF | (United Arab Emirates) | Mohammed Khalfan | 28 | 2016 | 2021 | |
| 33 | DF | (Japan) | Tsukasa Shiotani | 37 | 2017 | 2021 | |
| 34 | DF | (Brazil) | Rafael Pereira | 26 | 2020 | 2022 | |
| 44 | DF | (United Arab Emirates) | Saeed Juma | 28 | 2017 | 2021 | |
| 50 | DF | (United Arab Emirates) | Mohammed Fayez | 37 | 2010 | | |
| 71 | DF | (United Arab Emirates) | Ali Al Haidhani | 28 | 2018 | | |
| 77 | GK | (United Arab Emirates) | Ibrahim Al-Kaebi | 33 | 2020 | | |
| 88 | MF | (United Arab Emirates) | Fahad Hadeed | 33 | 2020 | | |
| 99 | FW | (United Arab Emirates) | Jamal Maroof | 34 | 2018 | 2025 | |

=== From Reserve U21 and Youth Academy ===
| No | Position | Player | Nation |
|---|---|---|---|
| 2 | DF | UAE | Saoud Al-Mahri |
| 24 | MF | SRB | Andrija Radovanovic |
| 25 | MF | UAE | Ali Al-Balochi |
| 29 | MF | UAE | Abdullah Sameer |
| 31 | DF | UAE | Saoud Al-Abri |
| 35 | DF | EGY | Ahmed Jamal |
| 42 | MF | BRA | Jonathan Santos |
| 53 | DF | UAE | Mansour Al-Shamsi |
| 54 | MF | PLE | Abdalla Mazen |
| 61 | GK | UAE | Zayed Khaled |
| 66 | MF | UAE | Mohammed Al-Zaabi |
| 70 | MF | UAE | Mohammed Abbas |
| 72 | FW | SDN | Mohamed Awadalla |
| 74 | MF | UAE | Naser Al-Shikali |
| 75 | DF | UAE | Saif Ghazi |
| 90 | FW | UAE | Eisa Khalfan |

=== Unregistered players ===
| No | Position | Player | Nation |
|---|---|---|---|
| 14 | MF | UAE | Rayan Yaslam |
| 38 | DF | UAE | Saeed Musabbeh |

=== Injury record ===
| N | P | Nat. | Name | Type | Status | Source | Match | Inj. Date | Ret. Date |
| 1 | GK | (United Arab Emirates) | Mohammed Abo Sandah | knee injury | | AlAinClub.ae | vs Al Dhafra (Pre-Season) | 22 August 2020 | 11 October 2020 |
| 99 | FW | (United Arab Emirates) | Jamal Maroof | fibula bone fracture in left foot | | AlAinClub.ae | vs Al Nassr (2019–20 season) | 24 September 2020 | 30 April 2021 |
| 9 | FW | (Togo) | Kodjo Laba | muscle injury | | DubaiSports.ae | in training | 7 October 2020 | 18 October 2020 |
| 7 | FW | (Brazil) | Caio Canedo | tear in the adductor muscle | | AlAinClub.ae | in training with UAE | 7 October 2020 | 21 October 2020 |
| 11 | MF | (United Arab Emirates) | Bandar Al-Ahbabi | left foot injury | | DubaiSports.ae | in training with UAE | 10 October 2020 | 18 October 2020 |
| 8 | MF | (Kazakhstan) | Bauyrzhan Islamkhan | muscle injury | | DubaiSports.ae | in training with Kazakhstan | 11 October 2020 | 18 October 2020 |
| 14 | MF | (United Arab Emirates) | Rayan Yaslam | | | AlAinClub.ae | vs Shabab Al Ahli | 23 October 2020 | 4 November 2020 |
| 5 | DF | (United Arab Emirates) | Ismail Ahmed | meniscus tear in right knee | | AlAinClub.ae | 2019–20 season | 5 November 2020 | Unknown |
| 4 | DF | (United Arab Emirates) | Mohammed Shaker | tear in the front and upper ligaments left shoulder | | AlAinClub.ae | vs Al Dhafra | 7 November 2020 | 2 December 2020 |
| 13 | MF | (United Arab Emirates) | Ahmed Barman | | | AlAinClub.ae | in training with UAE | 12 November 2020 | 17 November 2020 |
| 11 | MF | (United Arab Emirates) | Bandar Al-Ahbabi | Femoral bicep rupture (in left leg) | | AlAinClub.ae | vs Al Wasl | 20 November 2020 | 1 December 2020 |
| 7 | FW | (Brazil) | Caio Canedo | Hamstring injury | | AlKhaleej.ae | in training | 26 November 2020 | 16 December 2020 |
| 16 | MF | (United Arab Emirates) | Mohamed Abdulrahman | | | AlAinClub.ae | in training | 8 December 2020 | 17 December 2020 |
| 9 | FW | (Togo) | Kodjo Laba | foot injury | | AlAinClub.ae | in training | 9 December 2020 | 17 December 2020 |
| 44 | DF | (United Arab Emirates) | Saeed Juma | | | AlAinClub.ae | vs Al-Nasr in warm-up | 18 December 2020 | 22 December 2020 |
| 13 | MF | (United Arab Emirates) | Ahmed Barman | | | AlAinClub.ae | in training | 12 January 2021 | 11 February 2021 |
| 17 | GK | (United Arab Emirates) | Khalid Eisa | | | EmaratAlYoum.com | in training | 1 February 2021 | 7 February 2021 |
| 22 | MF | (Japan) | Shoya Nakajima | ankle injury | | AlAinClub.ae | in training | 22 February 2021 | End of season |
| 13 | MF | (United Arab Emirates) | Ahmed Barman | | | EmaratAlYoum.com | in training | 23 February 2021 | 16 March 2021 |
| 20 | MF | (Angola) | Wilson Eduardo | | | EmaratAlYoum.com | in training | 4 March 2021 | 15 March 2021 |
| 6 | MF | (United Arab Emirates) | Yahia Nader | bruise on the left foot | | AlRoeya.com | in training | 11 March 2021 | 15 March 2021 |
| 7 | FW | (Brazil) | Caio Canedo | right foot injury | | AlAinClub.ae | vs Bani Yas | 16 March 2021 | 2 April 2021 |
| 42 | MF | (Brazil) | Jonathan Santos | right foot injury | | AlAinClub.ae | vs Ajman | 21 March 2021 | Unknown |
| 44 | DF | (United Arab Emirates) | Saeed Juma | Femoral rupture in right foot | | AlAinClub.ae | vs Ajman | 21 March 2021 | 2 April 2021 |

- Player is injured
- Player has recovered from injury
Last updated: 30 April 2021
Source: AlAinClub.ae

== Transfers ==
=== In ===
| Date | Position | No. | Name | From | Type | Transfer window | Fee | Ref. |
|---|---|---|---|---|---|---|---|---|
| 1 July 2020 | MF | 42 | (Brazil) Jonathan Santos | (United Arab Emirates) Hatta | Loan return | Summer | Loan return | |
| 1 July 2020 | MF | 24 | (Serbia) Andrija Radovanovic | (United Arab Emirates) Ittihad Kalba | Loan return | Summer | Loan return | |
| 7 July 2020 | DF | 15 | (Brazil) Erik Menezes | (Brazil) Internacional | Transfer | Summer | €3,330,000 | |
| 15 July 2020 | MF | 20 | (Angola) Wilson Eduardo | (Portugal) Braga | Transfer | Summer | Free | |
| 28 July 2020 | MF | 88 | (United Arab Emirates) Fahad Hadeed | (United Arab Emirates) Khor Fakkan | Transfer | Summer | Free | |
| 28 July 2020 | GK | 77 | (United Arab Emirates) Ibrahim Al-Kaebi | (United Arab Emirates) Dibba Al-Hisn | Transfer | Summer | Free | |
| 4 October 2020 | MF | 66 | (United Arab Emirates) Mohammed Al-Zaabi | (United Arab Emirates) Al Wahda | Transfer | Summer | Free | |
| 16 January 2021 | MF | 22 | (Japan) Shoya Nakajima | (Portugal) Porto | Loan | Winter | Undisclosed | |

=== Out ===
| Date | Position | No. | Name | To | Fee | Ref. |
|---|---|---|---|---|---|---|
| 1 July 2020 | MF | — | (Hungary) Balázs Dzsudzsák | Free agent | Free | |
| 1 July 2020 | MF | — | (United Arab Emirates) Khaled Khalfan | (United Arab Emirates) Hatta | Free | |
| 4 July 2020 | MF | — | (United Arab Emirates) Sulaiman Nasser | (United Arab Emirates) Ajman | Free | |
| 7 July 2020 | DF | — | (United Arab Emirates) Firas Al Khusaibi | (United Arab Emirates) Hatta | Free | |
| 20 July 2020 | FW | — | (Syria) Hamza Muhanaeh | (Syria) Taliya | Free | |
| 10 August 2020 | FW | 20 | (United Arab Emirates) Saad Khamis | Free agent | Released | |
| 6 October 2020 | MF | — | (Portugal) Ângelo Barbosa | (United Arab Emirates) Dibba Al-Hisn | Free | |
| 13 October 2020 | FW | — | (Argentina) Guido Licheri | (Spain) San Fernando | Free | |
| 26 December 2020 | MF | 8 | (Kazakhstan) Bauyrzhan Islamkhan | Free agent (Note: Islamkhan was handed a two-year ban from football after testing positive for a banned substance after an Al Ain game in the AFC Champions League during September 2020.) | Released | |

=== Loans out ===
| No. | Pos | Name | To | Start date | End date | Ref. |
|---|---|---|---|---|---|---|
| — | FW | (United Arab Emirates) Ali Eid | (United Arab Emirates) Al-Fujairah | 8 July 2020 | End of Season | |
| — | DF | (Sudan) Waleed Siraj | (United Arab Emirates) Khor Fakkan | 13 July 2020 | End of Season | |
| — | MF | (United Arab Emirates) Falah Waleed | (United Arab Emirates) Khor Fakkan | 27 July 2020 | End of Season | |
| 70 | MF | (Syria) Hazem Muhanaeh | (United Arab Emirates) Al-Taawon | 16 September 2020 | End of Season | |
| 28 | MF | (France) Idriss Mzaouiyani | (United Arab Emirates) Al-Dhafra | 6 October 2020 | End of Season | |
| — | MF | (United Arab Emirates) Mohammed Jamal | (United Arab Emirates) Al Jazira | 23 January 2021 | End of Season | |

== Pre-season and friendlies ==
Win Draw Loss Fixtures

| 22 August 2020 Friendly (Abu Dhabi Football Clubs tournament) | Al Ain (United Arab Emirates) | 1–0 | (United Arab Emirates) Al Dhafra | Al Ain |
| 19:30 GMT+4 (UAE Time) | Hadeed 67' | Report | | Stadium: Hazza bin Zayed Stadium; Referee: Omar Gharib |

| 25 August 2020 Friendly (Abu Dhabi Football Clubs tournament) | Al Ain (United Arab Emirates) | 0–1 | (United Arab Emirates) Baniyas | Al Ain |
| 19:30 GMT+4 (UAE Time) | Salem Abdullah (red card) 27' | | Giménez 32' | Stadium: Hazza bin Zayed Stadium; Referee: Abdulla Al Hosani |

| 29 August 2020 Friendly (Abu Dhabi Football Clubs tournament) | Al Ain (United Arab Emirates) | 4–1 | (United Arab Emirates) Al Wahda | Al Ain |
| 19:30 GMT+4 (UAE Time) | Laba 10', 12'; Hadeed 67'; Maroof 88' | | K. Ibrahim 79' | Stadium: Hazza bin Zayed Stadium; Referee: Ibrahim Al Marzouqi |

| 4 September 2020 Friendly | Al Ain (United Arab Emirates) | 3–1 | (United Arab Emirates) Shabab Al-Ahli | Al Ain |
| | Laba; Eduardo; Shiotani | | Leonardo | Stadium: Hazza bin Zayed Stadium |

| 10 September 2020 Friendly | Al Ain (United Arab Emirates) | 1–2 | (United Arab Emirates) Al Nasr | Al Ain |
| | Laba | | Mendes | Stadium: Hazza bin Zayed Stadium |

| 21 April 2021 Friendly | Al Ain (United Arab Emirates) | 2–2 | (United Arab Emirates) Al Dhafra | Al Ain |
| 22:00 GMT+4 (UAE Time) | Laba; Hadeed | Report | Goal | Stadium: Khalifa bin Zayed; Referee: Ahmed Eisa |

== Competitions ==
=== Overview ===
| Competition | First match | Last match | Starting round | Final position | Record | | | | | | | |
| Competition | First match | Last match | Starting round | Final position | Pld | W | D | L | GF | GA | GD | Win % |
|---|---|---|---|---|---|---|---|---|---|---|---|---|
| Pro-League | 17 October 2020 | 11 May 2021 | Matchday 1 | 6 | 26 | 11 | 8 | 7 | 39 | 33 | +6 | 42.31 |
| President's Cup | 5 December 2020 | 5 December 2020 | Round of 16 | Round of 16 | 1 | 0 | 0 | 1 | 0 | 1 | −1 | 0.00 |
| League Cup | 9 October 2020 | 13 November 2020 | First round | First round | 2 | 0 | 1 | 1 | 2 | 4 | −2 | 0.00 |
| AFC Champions League | 10 April 2021 | 10 April 2021 | Play-off round | Play-off round | 1 | 0 | 0 | 1 | 0 | 4 | −4 | 0.00 |
| Total | | | | | 30 | 11 | 9 | 10 | 41 | 42 | −1 | 36.67 |

Last updated: 11 May 2021
Source: Soccerway

=== UAE Pro-League ===
==== League table ====
| Pos | Team | Pld | W | D | L | GF | GA | GD | Pts | Qualification or relegation |
|---|---|---|---|---|---|---|---|---|---|---|
| 4 | Sharjah | 26 | 14 | 6 | 6 | 48 | 29 | +19 | 48 | Qualification for AFC Champions League play-off round |
| 5 | Al Nasr | 26 | 14 | 4 | 8 | 47 | 33 | +14 | 46 | |
| 6 | Al Ain | 26 | 11 | 8 | 7 | 39 | 33 | +6 | 41 | |
| 7 | Al Wahda | 26 | 10 | 10 | 6 | 48 | 33 | +15 | 40 | |
| 8 | Kalba | 26 | 11 | 6 | 9 | 29 | 39 | −10 | 39 | |

Source: Arabian Gulf League
Rules for classification: 1) points; 2) head-to-head goal difference; 3) head-to-head goals scored; 4) head-to-head away goals scored; 5) goal difference; 6) number of goals scored; 7) number of away goals scored; 8) head-to-head points; 9) fair play ranking 10) draw

==== Results summary ====
| Overall | | | | | | | | Home | | | | | | Away | | | | | |
| Pld | W | D | L | GF | GA | GD | Pts | W | D | L | GF | GA | GD | W | D | L | GF | GA | GD |
|---|---|---|---|---|---|---|---|---|---|---|---|---|---|---|---|---|---|---|---|
| 26 | 11 | 8 | 7 | 39 | 33 | +6 | 41 | 5 | 4 | 4 | 19 | 17 | +2 | 6 | 4 | 3 | 20 | 16 | +4 |

Last updated: 11 May 2021.
Source: Soccerway

==== Results by round ====
| Round | 1 | 2 | 3 | 4 | 5 | 6 | 7 | 8 | 9 | 10 | 11 | 12 | 13 | 14 | 15 | 16 | 17 | 18 | 19 | 20 | 21 | 22 | 23 | 24 | 25 | 26 |
|---|---|---|---|---|---|---|---|---|---|---|---|---|---|---|---|---|---|---|---|---|---|---|---|---|---|---|
| Ground | H | A | H | A | H | A | H | A | H | A | H | H | A | A | H | A | H | A | H | A | H | A | H | A | A | H |
| Result | W | D | L | D | W | W | W | L | D | L | D | D | W | D | L | W | W | L | D | W | L | W | L | D | L | W |
| Position | 6 | 5 | 8 | 9 | 6 | 5 | 4 | 5 | 6 | 5 | 5 | 5 | 5 | 5 | 6 | 4 | 4 | 6 | 6 | 6 | 6 | 6 | 6 | 6 | 6 | 6 |

Updated to match(es) played on 11 May 2021. Source: UAE Pro League
A = Away; H = Home; W = Win; D = Draw; L = Loss

==== Matches ====
| 17 October 2020 1 | Al Ain | 2–0 | Khor Fakkan | Al-Ain |
| 18:15 GMT+4 (UAE Time) | R. Yaslam 27'; W. Eduardo 90' | Report | | Stadium: Hazza Bin Zayed Stadium; Attendance: 0 (Note: The match was played behind closed doors due to the COVID-19 pandemic in the United Arab Emirates.); Referee: Omar Mohamed Alali; Assistant referees: Hasan Almahri, Hasan Ahmed Alhammadi; Fourth official: Ahmed Mussabah Mubarak |

| 23 October 2020 2 | Shabab Al-Ahli | 1–1 | Al Ain | Dubai |
| 21:00 GMT+4 (UAE Time) | Y. Jaber 55' | Report | Laba 90' | Stadium: Rashid Stadium; Attendance: 0 Referee: Adel Al Naqbi; Assistant referees: Mohamed Ahmed Yousef, Mohamed Alobeidli; Fourth official: Ahmed Hasan Al Hammadi |

| 30 October 2020 3 | Al Ain | 1–2 | Sharjah | Al-Ain |
| 21:00 GMT+4 (UAE Time) | Shaker 83' | Report | Caio 16'; Coronado 30' | Stadium: Hazza Bin Zayed Stadium; Attendance: 0 Referee: Hamad Ali; Assistant referees: Ahmed Al Rashdi, Amer Al Qadri; Fourth official: Ahmed Al Hammadi |

| 3 November 2020 4 | Fujairah | 1–1 | Al Ain | Fujairah |
| 18:00 GMT+4 (UAE Time) | Rosa 90+1' | Report | Hadeed 90+3' | Stadium: Fujairah Stadium; Attendance: 0 Referee: Abdulla Al Ajel; Assistant referees: Ali Rashid Al Nuaimi, Yousef Alqiwani; Fourth official: Ahmed Hasan Hussain Bilal |

| 7 November 2020 5 | Al Ain | 4–1 | Al Dhafra | Al-Ain |
| 18:00 GMT+4 (UAE Time) | Kodjo Laba 27' (pen.), 90+6'; Shiotani 89'; Hadeed 90' | Report | Rosheuvel 20' | Stadium: Hazza Bin Zayed Stadium; Attendance: 0 Referee: Ahmed Salim; Assistant referees: Qais Al Khaddeim, Saeed Al Marzooqi; Fourth official: Khalid Bu Hasan |

| 20 November 2020 6 | Al-Wasl | 1–2 | Al Ain | Dubai |
| 18:00 GMT+4 (UAE Time) | A. Saleh 28'; Al-Azizi (yellow card) 21' (yellow-red card) 54' | Report | M. Abdulrahman 42'; Laba 62' (pen.) | Stadium: Zabeel Stadium; Attendance: 0 Referee: Sultan Mohamed Saleh; Assistant referees: Ahmed Al Rashdi, Ahmed Al Abdouli; Fourth official: Yousif Al Jasmi |

| 27 November 2020 7 | Al Ain | 1–0 | Al Wahda | Al-Ain |
| 21:00 GMT+4 (UAE Time) | Yaslam 64' | Report | | Stadium: Hazza Bin Zayed Stadium; Attendance: 0 Referee: Adel Al Naqbi; Assistant referees: Ali Rashid Al Nuaimi, Qais Al Khaddeim; Fourth official: Abdalla Rashid |

| 1 December 2020 8 | Baniyas | 4–1 | Al Ain | Abu Dhabi |
| 21:00 GMT+4 (UAE Time) | Pedro 2', 90'; Al-Noubi 5', 82' | Report | Eduardo 70' | Stadium: Baniyas Stadium; Attendance: 0 Referee: Mohammed Obaid Khadim; Assistant referees: Sabet Obaid, Salah Salim; Fourth official: Ahmed Hasan Al Hammadi |

| 10 December 2020 9 | Al Ain | 0–0 | Ajman | Al-Ain |
| 18:00 GMT+4 (UAE Time) | | Report | | Stadium: Hazza Bin Zayed Stadium; Attendance: 0 Referee: Hamad Ali Yousef; Assistant referees: Zayed Dawood, Amer Abdulla Hasan; Fourth official: Yousif Al Jasmi |

| 18 December 2020 10 | Al Nasr | 1–2 | Al Ain | Dubai |
| 21:00 GMT+4 (UAE Time) | Shiotani 70' (o.g.) | Report | Al-Ahbabi (red card) 23'; M. Abdulrahman 36'; Pereira 57' | Stadium: Al Maktoum Stadium; Attendance: 0 Referee: Mohammed Abdulla Hassan; Assistant referees: Mohamed Ahmed Yousef, Mohamed Alobeidli; Fourth official: Yousif Al Jasmi |

| 26 December 2020 11 | Al Ain | 1–1 | Kalba | Al-Ain |
| 18:00 GMT+4 (UAE Time) | Eduardo 28' | Report | Jshak 69' | Stadium: Hazza Bin Zayed Stadium; Attendance: 0 Referee: Ammar Al Jneibi; Assistant referees: Mohamed Ahmed Yousef, Ali Al Shehhi; Fourth official: Yousif Al Jasmi |

| 31 December 2020 12 | Al Ain | 2–2 | Al Jazira | Al-Ain |
| 20:00 GMT+4 (UAE Time) | Caio 23', 37'; Y. Nader (yellow card) 40' (yellow-red card) 42' | Report | Conçeicão 61'; K. Mubarak 63' | Stadium: Hazza Bin Zayed Stadium; Attendance: 0 Referee: Hamad Ali Yousef; Assistant referees: Juma Al Mukhaini, Waled Al Karmati; Fourth official: Yousif Al Jasmi |

| 15 January 2021 13 | Hatta | 0–1 | Al Ain | Dubai |
| 17:00 GMT+4 (UAE Time) | | Report | S. Abdullah 43' | Stadium: Hamdan Bin Rashid Stadium; Attendance: 0 Referee: Yousif Al Jasmi; Assistant referees: Ahmed Al Rashdi, Khamis Fairooz; Fourth official: Ahmed Mussabah Mubarak |

| 30 January 2021 14 | Khor Fakkan | 2–2 | Al Ain | Khor Fakkan |
| 17:30 GMT+4 (UAE Time) | Al Hammadi 25'; Dodô 68' | Report | Shiotani 40'; Laba 60' | Stadium: Saqr bin Mohammad al Qassimi Stadium; Attendance: 0 Referee: Ahmed Eisa Darwish; Assistant referees: Masoud Hassan, Abdulla Sharif Almarzooqi; Fourth official: Ahmed Hasan Hussain Bilal |

| 5 February 2021 15 | Al Ain | 1–4 | Shabab Al Ahli | Al-Ain |
| 20:15 GMT+4 (UAE Time) | M. Salem 90+3' | Report | Eduardo 9' (pen.), 74'; Cartabia 53'; I. Jesus 82' | Stadium: Hazza Bin Zayed Stadium; Attendance: 0 Referee: Sultan Mohamed Saleh; Assistant referees: Sabet Obaid, Amer Abdulla Hasan; Fourth official: Mohamed Abdalla Alharmoodi |

| 13 February 2021 16 | Sharjah | 1–2 | Al Ain | Sharjah |
| 20:15 GMT+4 (UAE Time) | Caio 10' | Report | Y. Nader 47'; Laba 72' | Stadium: Sharjah Stadium; Attendance: 0 Referee: Ahmed Salim Khalfan; Assistant referees: Jasem Abdulla, Waled Al Karmati; Fourth official: Yousuf Al Shamali |

| 19 February 2021 17 | Al Ain | 3–1 | Fujairah | Al-Ain |
| 20:15 GMT+4 (UAE Time) | Caio 23', 83'; Laba 71' (pen.) | Report | Armenteros 89' | Stadium: Hazza Bin Zayed Stadium; Attendance: 0 Referee: Omar Mohamed Alali; Assistant referees: Hasan Almahri, Ahmed Alabdouli; Fourth official: Amer Aldhubiea |

| 25 February 2021 18 | Al Dhafra | 2–1 | Al Ain | Abu Dhabi |
| 17:30 GMT+4 (UAE Time) | Diop 34', 77' (pen.) | Report | Laba 50' (pen.) | Stadium: Sheikh Hamdan Bin Zayed Stadium; Attendance: 0 Referee: Sultan Mohamed Saleh; Assistant referees: Qais Al Khaddeim, Ali Saeed Alnaqbi; Fourth official: Khalid Bu Hasan |

| 6 March 2021 19 | Al Ain | 1–1 | Al-Wasl | Al-Ain |
| 17:30 GMT+4 (UAE Time) | Caio 55' | Report | Mendes 59' | Stadium: Hazza Bin Zayed Stadium; Attendance: 0 Referee: Yahya Al Mulla; Assistant referees: Mohamed Ahmed Yousef, Masoud Hassan; Fourth official: Zayed Alawlaqi |

| 12 March 2021 20 | Al Wahda | 0–4 | Al Ain | Abu Dhabi |
| 20:15 GMT+4 (UAE Time) | A. Rashed (yellow card) 65' (yellow-red card) 74' | Report | Laba 10', 88'; Caio 15'; K. Al-Balochi 31' | Stadium: Al Nahyan Stadium; Attendance: 0 Referee: Omar Mohamed Al Ali; Assistant referees: Hasan Al Mahri, Amer Al Qadri; Fourth official: Ahmed Hasan Al Hammadi |

| 16 March 2021 21 | Al Ain | 1–2 | Baniyas | Al-Ain |
| 20:15 GMT+4 (UAE Time) | Laba 4' | Report | S. Al-Shamsi 51'; J. Pedro 78' | Stadium: Hazza Bin Zayed Stadium; Attendance: 0 Referee: Sultan Mohamed Saleh; Assistant referees: Jasem Abdulla, Ali Rashid Al Nuaimi; Fourth official: Hasan Ali Mohamed Alblooshi |

| 21 March 2021 22 | Ajman | 0–2 | Al Ain | Ajman |
| 17:45 GMT+4 (UAE Time) | Trawally (yellow card) 29'; Al-Yamahi (yellow card) 32'; Ahmad (yellow card) 62' | Report | Abbas 15'; Yaisien (yellow card) 22'; Shiotani (yellow card) 35'; Laba 86' | Stadium: Rashid Bin Saeed Stadium; Attendance: 0 Referee: Sultan Abdurazzaq; Assistant referees: Juma Almukhaini, Qais Al Khaddeim; Fourth official: Naser Alali |

| 2 April 2021 23 | Al Ain | 1–3 | Al Nasr | Al-Ain |
| 20:15 GMT+4 (UAE Time) | Al Ahbabi 47'; M. Salem (yellow card) 83' | Report | Gláuber (yellow card) 24'; Saba 38'; Ghuloom (yellow card) 51'; Ayed (yellow card) 57'; Valentini 79'; Tagliabúe 88'; Abeid (yellow card) 93' | Stadium: Hazza Bin Zayed Stadium; Attendance: 0 Referee: Ammar Al-Jeneibi; Assistant referees: Ahmed Al Rashdi, Masoud Hassan; Fourth official: Zayed Alawlaqi |

| 3 May 2021 24 | Kalba | 1–1 | Al Ain | Kalba |
| 21:00 GMT+4 (UAE Time) | Mlapa 31'; Mariani (yellow card) 40'; M. Rashed (yellow card) 54' | Report | Laba 18'; K. Eisa (yellow card) 40'; K. Al-Balochi (yellow card) 40' | Stadium: Ittihad Kalba Stadium; Attendance: 0 Referee: Adel Al Naqbi; Assistant referees: Ali Al Nuaimi, Jasim Al Ajmi; Fourth official: Yousif Al Jasmi |

| 7 May 2021 25 | Al Jazira | 2–0 | Al Ain | Abu Dhabi |
| 23:00 GMT+4 (UAE Time) | S. Rashid (yellow card) 24'; Mabkhout 33'; Traoré (yellow card) 61'; Kosanović 80'; Rabii (yellow card) 93' | Report | Erik (yellow card) 5'; Rafael (yellow card) 79' | Stadium: Mohammed bin Zayed Stadium; Attendance: 0 Referee: Mohammed Abdulla Hassan; Assistant referees: Mohamed Ahmed Yousef, Hasan Al Mahri; Fourth official: Amer Aldhubiea |

| 11 May 2021 26 | Al Ain | 1–0 | Hatta | Al-Ain |
| 22:00 GMT+4 (UAE Time) | Caio 31'; Erik (yellow card) 34'; Al-Shikali (yellow card) 61' | Report | Al Marzouqi (yellow card) 45' | Stadium: Khalifa bin Zayed; Attendance: 0 Referee: Khalid Bu Hasan; Assistant referees: Salah Salim, Mohamed Ali Helal; Fourth official: Humaid Khalfan Al Shamsi |

=== President's Cup ===
==== Round of 16 ====
| 5 December 2020 | Al Ain | 0–1 | Ajman | Al Ain |
| 16:45 GMT+4 (UAE Time) | | Report | Owusu 44' | Stadium: Hazza bin Zayed Stadium |

=== League Cup ===
==== First round ====
| 9 October 2020 First leg | Al Ain | 2–4 | Khor Fakkan | Al-Ain |
| 18:30 GMT+4 (UAE Time) | Abdulrahman 45+2'; Pereira 71' | Report | Autonne 34'; Juninho 47'; Jumaa 48'; Lopes 82' | Stadium: Hazza Bin Zayed Stadium; Referee: Yousif Al Jasmi; Assistant referees: Mohammed Ahmed Yousuf; Mohamed Ali Al Shehhi; Fourth official: Mohomed Obaid Khadim |

| 13 November 2020 Second leg | Khor Fakkan | 0–0 (4–2 agg.) | Al Ain | Khor Fakkan |
| 18:00 GMT+4 (UAE Time) | | Report | | Stadium: Saqr bin Mohammad al Qassimi Stadium; Referee: Khalid Bu Hasan; Assistant referees: Hassan Ali Al Hammadi; Othman Al Maazmi; Fourth official: Hasan Al Blooshi |

=== AFC Champions League ===
==== Play-off round ====
| 10 April 2021 | Foolad (Iran) | 4–0 | (United Arab Emirates) Al-Ain | Riyadh (Note: Originally scheduled to be held on 7 April 2021 in Foolad Arena, Ahvaz, the Asian Football Confederation announced that teams from Iran would not be allowed to host their home matches in their country, so the match was rescheduled to 10 April 2021 and was held in Saudi Arabia.) |
| 19:50 GMT+4 (UAE Time) | Sal. Hardani 41'; Chimba 49', 86'; Patosi 56' | Live Report; Stats Report | (yellow card) 41' | Stadium: Prince Faisal bin Fahd; Referee: Hettikamkanamge Perera (Sri Lanka) |

== Statistics ==
=== Squad appearances and goals ===
Last updated on 11 May 2021.

| No. | Pos | Nat | Player | Total | | Pro-League | | President's Cup | | League Cup | | Champions League | |
| No. | Pos | Nat | Player | Apps | Goals | Apps | Goals | Apps | Goals | Apps | Goals | Apps | Goals |
Goalkeepers
| 1 | GK | (United Arab Emirates) UAE | Mohammed Abo Sandah | 3 | 0 | 2 | 0 | 0 | 0 | 1 | 0 | 0 | 0 |
| 12 | GK | (United Arab Emirates) UAE | Hamad Al-Mansouri | 1 | 0 | 0 | 0 | 0 | 0 | 1 | 0 | 0 | 0 |
| 17 | GK | (United Arab Emirates) UAE | Khalid Eisa | 26 | 0 | 24 | 0 | 1 | 0 | 0 | 0 | 1 | 0 |
Defenders
| 3 | DF | (United Arab Emirates) UAE | Salem Abdullah | 17 | 1 | 14 | 1 | 1 | 0 | 2 | 0 | 0 | 0 |
| 4 | DF | (United Arab Emirates) UAE | Mohammed Shaker | 9 | 1 | 9 | 1 | 0 | 0 | 0 | 0 | 0 | 0 |
| 15 | DF | (Brazil) BRA | Erik Menezes | 27 | 0 | 23 | 0 | 1 | 0 | 2 | 0 | 1 | 0 |
| 19 | DF | (United Arab Emirates) UAE | Mohanad Salem | 10 | 1 | 9 | 1 | 0 | 0 | 0 | 0 | 1 | 0 |
| 21 | DF | (United Arab Emirates) UAE | Mohammed Hilal | 1 | 0 | 0 | 0 | 0 | 0 | 1 | 0 | 0 | 0 |
| 23 | DF | (United Arab Emirates) UAE | Mohamed Ahmed | 4 | 0 | 4 | 0 | 0 | 0 | 0 | 0 | 0 | 0 |
| 33 | DF | (Japan) JPN | Tsukasa Shiotani | 29 | 2 | 25 | 2 | 1 | 0 | 2 | 0 | 1 | 0 |
| 34 | DF | (Brazil) BRA | Rafael Pereira | 20 | 2 | 17 | 1 | 1 | 0 | 2 | 1 | 0 | 0 |
| 35 | DF | (Egypt) EGY | Ahmed Jamal | 3 | 0 | 3 | 0 | 0 | 0 | 0 | 0 | 0 | 0 |
| 44 | DF | (United Arab Emirates) UAE | Saeed Juma | 21 | 0 | 18 | 0 | 1 | 0 | 1 | 0 | 1 | 0 |
| 50 | DF | (United Arab Emirates) UAE | Mohammed Fayez | 2 | 0 | 2 | 0 | 0 | 0 | 0 | 0 | 0 | 0 |
Midfielders
| 6 | MF | (Egypt) EGY | Yahia Nader | 25 | 1 | 21 | 1 | 1 | 0 | 2 | 0 | 1 | 0 |
| 11 | MF | (United Arab Emirates) UAE | Bandar Al-Ahbabi | 22 | 1 | 20 | 1 | 1 | 0 | 0 | 0 | 1 | 0 |
| 13 | MF | (United Arab Emirates) UAE | Ahmed Barman | 22 | 0 | 20 | 0 | 1 | 0 | 0 | 0 | 1 | 0 |
| 14 | MF | (United Arab Emirates) UAE | Rayan Yaslam | 10 | 2 | 7 | 2 | 1 | 0 | 2 | 0 | 0 | 0 |
| 16 | MF | (United Arab Emirates) UAE | Mohamed Abdulrahman | 14 | 3 | 11 | 2 | 1 | 0 | 2 | 1 | 0 | 0 |
| 18 | MF | (United Arab Emirates) UAE | Khalid Al-Bloushi | 18 | 1 | 16 | 1 | 1 | 0 | 0 | 0 | 1 | 0 |
| 20 | MF | (Angola) ANG | Wilson Eduardo | 20 | 3 | 18 | 3 | 1 | 0 | 1 | 0 | 0 | 0 |
| 21 | MF | (United Arab Emirates) UAE | Mohammed Hilal | 1 | 0 | 1 | 0 | 0 | 0 | 0 | 0 | 0 | 0 |
| 22 | MF | (Japan) JPN | Shoya Nakajima | 2 | 0 | 2 | 0 | 0 | 0 | 0 | 0 | 0 | 0 |
| 24 | MF | (Serbia) SRB | Andrija Radovanovic | 5 | 0 | 4 | 0 | 0 | 0 | 1 | 0 | 0 | 0 |
| 25 | MF | (United Arab Emirates) UAE | Ali Al-Blooshi | 6 | 0 | 5 | 0 | 0 | 0 | 1 | 0 | 0 | 0 |
| 26 | MF | (Egypt) EGY | Omar Yaisien | 9 | 0 | 7 | 0 | 0 | 0 | 2 | 0 | 0 | 0 |
| 27 | MF | (United Arab Emirates) UAE | Mohsen Abdullah | 3 | 0 | 2 | 0 | 0 | 0 | 1 | 0 | 0 | 0 |
| 29 | MF | (United Arab Emirates) UAE | Abdullah Sameer | 1 | 0 | 0 | 0 | 0 | 0 | 1 | 0 | 0 | 0 |
| 42 | MF | (Brazil) BRA | Jonathan Santos | 5 | 0 | 5 | 0 | 0 | 0 | 0 | 0 | 0 | 0 |
| 54 | MF | (Palestine) PLE | Abdallah Mazen | 1 | 0 | 0 | 0 | 0 | 0 | 1 | 0 | 0 | 0 |
| 70 | MF | (United Arab Emirates) UAE | Mohammed Abbas | 8 | 1 | 7 | 1 | 0 | 0 | 0 | 0 | 1 | 0 |
| 74 | MF | (United Arab Emirates) UAE | Naser Al-Shikali | 8 | 0 | 7 | 0 | 0 | 0 | 0 | 0 | 1 | 0 |
| 88 | MF | (United Arab Emirates) UAE | Fahad Hadeed | 19 | 2 | 15 | 2 | 1 | 0 | 2 | 0 | 1 | 0 |
Forwards
| 7 | FW | (Brazil) BRA | Caio Canedo | 21 | 7 | 20 | 7 | 0 | 0 | 0 | 0 | 1 | 0 |
| 9 | FW | (Togo) TOG | Kodjo Laba | 25 | 13 | 23 | 13 | 1 | 0 | 0 | 0 | 1 | 0 |
| 30 | FW | (United Arab Emirates) UAE | Mohammed Khalfan | 12 | 0 | 10 | 0 | 0 | 0 | 2 | 0 | 0 | 0 |
| 72 | FW | (Sudan) SDN | Mohamed Awad | 3 | 0 | 2 | 0 | 0 | 0 | 1 | 0 | 0 | 0 |
| 90 | FW | (United Arab Emirates) UAE | Eisa Khalfan | 2 | 0 | 1 | 0 | 0 | 0 | 0 | 0 | 1 | 0 |
Players who have made an appearance this season but have left the club
| 8 | MF | (Kazakhstan) KAZ | Bauyrzhan Islamkhan | 4 | 0 | 4 | 0 | 0 | 0 | 0 | 0 | 0 | 0 |

=== Clean sheets ===
As of 11 May 2021

| Rank | Player | Clean sheets |
|---|---|---|
| 1 | (United Arab Emirates) Khalid Eisa | 7 |
| 2 | (United Arab Emirates) Mohammed Abo Sandah | 1 |

=== Goalscorers ===
As of 11 May 2021

Includes all competitive matches. The list is sorted alphabetically by surname when total goals are equal.

| Rank | No. | Pos. | Player | Pro-League | President's Cup | League Cup | Champions League | Total |
|---|---|---|---|---|---|---|---|---|
| 1 | 9 | FW | (Togo) Kodjo Laba | 13 | 0 | 0 | 0 | 13 |
| 2 | 7 | FW | (Brazil) Caio Canedo | 7 | 0 | 0 | 0 | 7 |
| 3 | 20 | MF | (Angola) Wilson Eduardo | 3 | 0 | 0 | 0 | 3 |
| 3 | 16 | MF | (United Arab Emirates) Mohamed Abdulrahman | 2 | 0 | 1 | 0 | 3 |
| 4 | 33 | DF | (Japan) Tsukasa Shiotani | 2 | 0 | 0 | 0 | 2 |
| 4 | 14 | MF | (United Arab Emirates) Rayan Yaslam | 2 | 0 | 0 | 0 | 2 |
| 4 | 88 | MF | (United Arab Emirates) Fahad Hadeed | 2 | 0 | 0 | 0 | 2 |
| 4 | 34 | DF | (Brazil) Rafael Pereira | 1 | 0 | 1 | 0 | 2 |
| 5 | 11 | MF | (United Arab Emirates) Bandar Al-Ahbabi | 1 | 0 | 0 | 0 | 1 |
| 5 | 70 | MF | (United Arab Emirates) Mohammed Abbas | 1 | 0 | 0 | 0 | 1 |
| 5 | 18 | MF | (United Arab Emirates) Khalid Al-Balochi | 1 | 0 | 0 | 0 | 1 |
| 5 | 3 | DF | (United Arab Emirates) Salem Abdullah | 1 | 0 | 0 | 0 | 1 |
| 5 | 4 | DF | (United Arab Emirates) Mohammed Shaker | 1 | 0 | 0 | 0 | 1 |
| 5 | 19 | MF | (United Arab Emirates) Mohanad Salem | 1 | 0 | 0 | 0 | 1 |
| 5 | 6 | DF | (Egypt) Yahia Nader | 1 | 0 | 0 | 0 | 1 |
| Own goals | | | | 1 | 0 | 0 | 0 | 1 |
| Totals | | | | 40 | 0 | 2 | 0 | 42 |

=== Disciplinary record ===
| N | P | Nat. | Name | Pro-League | | | League Cup | | | President's Cup | | | Champions League | | | Total | | | Notes |
| N | P | Nat. | Name | Yellow card | Second yellow card | Red card | Yellow card | Second yellow card | Red card | Yellow card | Second yellow card | Red card | Yellow card | Second yellow card | Red card | Yellow card | Second yellow card | Red card | Notes |
| 3 | DF | (United Arab Emirates) | Salem Abdullah | 4 | | | | | | 1 | | | | | | 5 | | | |
| 33 | DF | (Japan) | Tsukasa Shiotani | 5 | | | | | | | | | | | | 5 | | | |
| 15 | DF | (Brazil) | Erik Menezes | 5 | | | | | 1 | | | | | | | 5 | | 1 | |
| 34 | DF | (Brazil) | Rafael Pereira | 4 | | | | | | | | | | | | 4 | | | |
| 25 | MF | (United Arab Emirates) | Ali Al-Blooshi | 2 | | | 1 | | | | | | | | | 3 | | | |
| 16 | MF | (United Arab Emirates) | Mohamed Abdulrahman | 2 | | | | | | 1 | | | | | | 3 | | | |
| 74 | MF | (United Arab Emirates) | Nasser Al-Shekaili | 2 | | | | | | | | | | | | 2 | | | |
| 18 | MF | (United Arab Emirates) | Khalid Al-Bloushi | 2 | | | | | | | | | | | | 2 | | | |
| 17 | GK | (United Arab Emirates) | Khalid Eisa | 2 | | | | | | | | | | | | 2 | | | |
| 11 | MF | (United Arab Emirates) | Bandar Al-Ahbabi | 1 | | 1 | | | | 1 | | | | | | 2 | | 1 | |
| 8 | MF | (United Arab Emirates) | Yahia Nader | 2 | 1 | | | | | | | | | | | 2 | 1 | | |
| 88 | MF | (United Arab Emirates) | Fahad Hadeed | 2 | | | | | | | | | | | | 2 | | | |
| 44 | DF | (United Arab Emirates) | Saeed Juma | 2 | | | | | | | | | | | | 2 | | | |
| 4 | DF | (United Arab Emirates) | Mohammed Shaker | 1 | | | 1 | | | | | | | | | 2 | | | |
| 19 | DF | (United Arab Emirates) | Mohanad Salem | 2 | | | | | | | | | | | | 2 | | | |
| 26 | MF | (Egypt) | Omar Yaisien | 1 | | | | | | | | | | | | 1 | | | |
| 7 | FW | (Brazil) | Caio Canedo | 1 | | | | | | | | | | | | 1 | | | |
| 0 | FW | (Togo) | Kodjo Laba | 1 | | | | | | | | | | | | 1 | | | |
| 13 | MF | (United Arab Emirates) | Ahmed Barman | 1 | | | | | | | | | | | | 1 | | | |
| 23 | DF | (United Arab Emirates) | Mohamed Ahmed | 1 | | | | | | | | | | | | 1 | | | |
| 30 | MF | (United Arab Emirates) | Mohammed Khalfan | 1 | | | | | | | | | | | | 1 | | | |
| 14 | MF | (United Arab Emirates) | Rayan Yaslam | 1 | | | | | | | | | | | | 1 | | | |
| 27 | MF | (United Arab Emirates) | Mohsen Abdullah | | | | | | 1 | | | | | | | | | 1 | |

Last updated: 11 May 2021
Source: UAEProLeague.ae, AlAinClub.ae
Ordered by (red card) , (second yellow card) and (yellow card)
(yellow card) = Number of bookings; (second yellow card) = Number of sending offs after a second yellow card; (red card) = Number of sending offs by a direct red card.

=== Assists ===
As of 11 May 2021

| No. | Player | Pro-League | President's Cup | League Cup | Champions League | Total |
|---|---|---|---|---|---|---|
| 11 | (United Arab Emirates) Bandar Al-Ahbabi | 4 | 0 | 0 | 0 | 4 |
| 9 | (Togo) Kodjo Laba | 3 | 0 | 0 | 0 | 3 |
| 3 | (United Arab Emirates) Salem Abdullah | 3 | 0 | 0 | 0 | 3 |
| 18 | (United Arab Emirates) Khalid Al-Balochi | 3 | 0 | 0 | 0 | 3 |
| 15 | (Brazil) Erik Menezes | 2 | 0 | 0 | 0 | 2 |
| 16 | (United Arab Emirates) Mohamed Abdulrahman | 2 | 0 | 0 | 0 | 2 |
| 20 | (Angola) Wilson Eduardo | 2 | 0 | 0 | 0 | 2 |
| 42 | (Brazil) Jonathan Santos | 1 | 0 | 0 | 0 | 1 |
| 14 | (United Arab Emirates) Rayan Yaslam | 1 | 0 | 0 | 0 | 1 |
| 88 | (United Arab Emirates) Fahad Hadeed | 1 | 0 | 0 | 0 | 1 |
| 33 | (Japan) Tsukasa Shiotani | 1 | 0 | 0 | 0 | 1 |
| 34 | (Brazil) Rafael Pereira | 0 | 0 | 1 | 0 | 1 |
| 8 | (Kazakhstan) Bauyrzhan Islamkhan | 1 | 0 | 0 | 0 | 1 |
| Totals | | 25 | 0 | 1 | 0 | 26 |

=== Squad statistics ===
As of 11 May 2021

| | League | Asia | League Cup | President's Cup | Total |
|---|---|---|---|---|---|
| Games played | 26 | 1 | 2 | 1 | 30 |
| Games won | 11 | 0 | 0 | 0 | 11 |
| Games drawn | 8 | 0 | 1 | 0 | 9 |
| Games lost | 7 | 1 | 1 | 1 | 10 |
| Goals scored | 39 | 0 | 2 | 0 | 41 |
| Goals conceded | 33 | 4 | 4 | 1 | 42 |
| Goal difference | 6 | -4 | 2 | -1 | 13 |
| Clean sheets | 7 | 0 | 1 | 0 | 8 |
| Goal by Substitute | 2 | 0 | 0 | 0 | 2 |
| Total shots | 360 | 0 | 26 | 20 | 406 |
| Shots on target | 127 | 0 | 8 | - | 135 |
| Corners | 158 | 0 | 18 | 11 | 187 |
| Players used | 35 | 15 | 21 | 15 | 85 |
| Offsides | 36 | 0 | 2 | 0 | 38 |
| Fouls suffered | 340 | 4 | 35 | 11 | 390 |
| Fouls committed | 323 | 4 | 30 | 9 | 366 |
| Yellow cards | 45 | 0 | 2 | 2 | 49 |
| Red cards | 2 | 0 | 2 | 0 | 4 |
