= Yaisien =

Yaisien (Egyptian Arabic: ياسين) is an Egyptian Arabic surname. Notable people with the surname include:

- Abdallah Yaisien (born 1994), French footballer
- Omar Yaisien (born 2000), French footballer
