= Idriss Mzaouiyani =

French footballer (born 2000)

Personal information
- Date of birth: 15 January 2000 (age 26)
- Place of birth: Le Blanc-Mesnil, France
- Height: 1.72 m (5 ft 8 in)
- Position: Midfielder

Youth career
- 2005–2009: AS Bondy
- 2009–2010: Villemomble Sports
- 2010–2013: AS Bondy
- 2013–2019: Paris Saint-Germain

Senior career*
Years	Team	Apps	(Gls)
2018–2019	Paris Saint-Germain B	16	(2)
2019–2021	Al Ain	6	(0)
2020–2021	→ Al-Dhafra (loan)	4	(1)
2022	Al-Fujairah		
2023	Gulf United		
- * Club domestic league appearances and goals as of 20:57, 13 March 2022 (UTC)

Idriss Mzaouiyani (born 15 January 2000) is a French professional footballer who plays as a midfielder for Emirati UAE First Division League club Gulf United.

== Career statistics ==
As of match played 20 March 2021

Club	Season	League			Cup		Other		Total	
Club	Season	Division	Apps	Goals	Apps	Goals	Apps	Goals	Apps	Goals
Paris Saint-Germain B	2018–19	Championnat National 2	16	2	—		—		16	2
Al Ain	2019–20	UAE Pro League	6	0	3 (Note: Appearances in the UAE League Cup)	0	0	0	9	0
Al Dhafra (loan)	2020–21	UAE Pro League	4	1	1	0	—		5	1
Career total			26	3	4	0	0	0	30	3
