= Al Hussain Saleh =

Emirati footballer (born 1991)

Hussein Saleh
Personal information
- Full name: Hussein Saleh
- Date of birth: 25 June 1991 (age 35)
- Place of birth: United Arab Emirates
- Height: 1.71 m (5 ft 7 in)
- Position: Winger

Youth career
- 2004–2010: Ras Al-Khaima

Senior career*
Years	Team	Apps	(Gls)
2010–2011	Ras Al-Khaima		
2011–2018	Emirates Club	71	(4)
2014	→ Al-Nasr (loan)	9	(1)
2018–2022	Al-Nasr	12	(0)
2019-2020	→ Al Wahda (loan)	18	(0)
2020–2021	→ Hatta (loan)	10	(1)
- * Club domestic league appearances and goals

Al Hussain Saleh (Arabic: الحسين صالح) (born 25 June 1991) is an Emirati footballer who plays as a winger.
