= Khalaf Al-Hosani =

Emirati footballer (born 1996)

Personal information
- Full name: Khalaf Mohammed Al-Hosani
- Date of birth: 23 February 1996 (age 30)
- Place of birth: United Arab Emirates
- Height: 1.80 m (5 ft 11 in)
- Position: Left back

Youth career
- Al Dhafra

Senior career*
Years	Team	Apps	(Gls)
2015–2023	Al Dhafra	55	(0)
2020	→ Hatta (loan)	4	(0)
2020–2021	→ Hatta (loan)	16	(0)
2022–2023	→ Khor Fakkan (loan)	16	(0)
2023–2025	Baniyas	25	(0)
- * Club domestic league appearances and goals

Khalaf Al-Hosani (Arabic:خلف الحوسني; born 23 February 1996) is an Emirati footballer. He currently plays as a left back.
