= Ibrahim Saeed (footballer) =

Emirati footballer (born 1992)

Personal information
- Full name: Ibrahim Saeed Masoud Al-Yaqoubi
- Date of birth: 14 January 1992 (age 34)
- Place of birth: United Arab Emirates
- Height: 1.66 m (5 ft 5 1/2 in)
- Position: Left back

Youth career
- Baniyas

Senior career*
Years	Team	Apps	(Gls)
2010–2013	Baniyas	17	(1)
2013–2021	Al Dhafra	85	(1)
2021–2022	Khor Fakkan	6	(0)
2022–2024	Dibba Al Fujairah	10	(1)
2024	Al Urooba		
2024–2025	Al Dhafra		
- * Club domestic league appearances and goals

Ibrahim Saeed (Arabic:إبراهيم سعيد) (born 14 January 1992) is an Emirati footballer who plays as a left back.
