= Fahad Hadeed =

Emirati footballer (born 1993)

Personal information
- Full name: Fahad Salim Hadeed Obaid Ghraib
- Date of birth: 7 July 1993 (age 33)
- Place of birth: Sharjah, United Arab Emirates
- Height: 1.69 m (5 ft 7 in)
- Position: Winger

Team information
- Current team: Masfout
- Number: 10

Youth career
- Sharjah

Senior career*
Years	Team	Apps	(Gls)
2009–2011	Sharjah	22	(2)
2011–2014	Al Wasl FC	44	(6)
2014–2018	Al Nassr	19	(1)
2017	→ Emirates Club (loan)	10	(0)
2019–2020	Khor Fakkan	15	(3)
2020–2021	Al Ain	15	(2)
2021–2023	Khor Fakkan	14	(0)
2023–2024	Hatta	2	(0)
2024–2025	Masfout		
2025–2026	Dubai City		
2026–	Masfout		

International career^{‡}
2007–2010	UAE U17	0	(0)
2010–	UAE U20	1	(0)
- * Club domestic league appearances and goals as of 1 June 2011 ‡ National team caps and goals as of 24 December 2011

Fahad Salim Hadid Obaid Ghraib (Arabic: فهد سالم حديد عبيد غريب; born 7 July 1993), commonly known as Fahad Hadeed, is an Emirati footballer who played as a winger for UAE First Division League club Masfout and former the UAE national under-20 football team.

Hadeed used to play for Al Sharjah SC since his youth years. He was released on a free transfer following a dispute with the club, he then signed a new contract with Al Wasl FC in December 2011.
