= Hamdan Nasser =

Emirati footballer (born 1997)

Personal information
- Full name: Hamdan Nasser Masoud
- Date of birth: 24 April 1997 (age 29)
- Place of birth: United Arab Emirates
- Height: 1.87 m (6 ft 1 1/2 in)
- Position: Defender

Youth career
- Ittihad Kalba

Senior career*
Years	Team	Apps	(Gls)
2015–2020	Ittihad Kalba	65	(0)
2020–2023	Shabab Al-Ahli	0	(0)
2020–2021	→ Fujairah (loan)	22	(0)
2021–2022	→ Khor Fakkan (loan)	18	(2)
2022–2023	→ Al Bataeh (loan)	14	(0)
2023–2024	Khor Fakkan	6	(0)
2024–2025	Masfout		
- * Club domestic league appearances and goals

Hamdan Nasser (Arabic:حمدان ناصر) (born 24 April 1997) is an Emirati footballer. He currently plays as a defender.
