= 2019–20 UAE President's Cup =

Tournament details
- Country: United Arab Emirates
- Dates: 28 September 2019 – 10 March 2020
- Teams: 16 (Knockout round); 27 (Total)

Final positions
- Champions: not awarded

Tournament statistics
- Matches played: 40
- Goals scored: 122 (3.05 per match)
- All statistics correct as of 22 February 2020. No title rewarded

The 2019–20 UAE President's Cup was the 44th edition of the UAE President's Cup, a football cup competition of the United Arab Emirates. The winner will qualify for the 2021 AFC Champions League. The tournament was cancelled along with the rest of the UAE league season.

== Preliminary round ==
In the preliminary round, eleven teams were divided into two groups, one containing six teams while the other containing five.

=== Group A ===
Team	Pld	W	D	L	GF	GA	GD	Pts
Dibba Al Hisn	5	3	2	0	14	7	+7	11
Masfout	5	3	1	1	8	9	−1	10
Al Dhaid SC	5	2	2	1	7	6	+1	8
Dibba Al Fujairah	5	1	1	3	7	7	0	4
Al Urooba	5	1	1	3	6	12	−6	4
Al Taawon	5	0	3	2	6	8	−2	3

Source: uaefa

=== Group B ===
Team	Pld	W	D	L	GF	GA	GD	Pts
Al Bataeh	4	4	0	0	9	2	+7	12
Al Hamriyah	4	3	0	1	14	4	+10	9
Al Arabi	4	2	0	2	8	10	−2	6
Emirates	4	1	0	3	3	8	−5	3
Masafi	4	0	0	4	3	13	−10	0

Source: uaefa

== Bracket ==
As per UAE Football Association matches database:

Round of 16
Al Ain	2
Dibba Al Hisn	0
Khor Fakkan	0
Al Wasl	1
Al Bataeh	2
Kalba	4
Hatta	1 (3)
Sharjah	1 (4)
Fujairah	0
Baniyas	1
Shabab Al-Ahli	2
Al Nasr	1
Al Dhafra	0 (9)
Ajman	0 (8)
Al Wahda	2
Al Jazira	3

Quarter-finals
Al Ain	6
Al Wasl	5
Kalba	0
Sharjah	2
Baniyas	1
Shabab Al-Ahli	0
Al Dhafra	2
Al Jazira	1

Semi-finals
Al Ain	3
Sharjah	2
Baniyas	0
Al Dhafra (a.e.t.)	1

Final
Al Ain
Al Dhafra

== Round of 16 ==
All times are local (UTC+04:00)

23 December 2019	Al Ain	2–0	Dibba Al Hisn	Dubai
15:50	Jamal Ibrahim 41'; Caio 45+1'; Abdulrahman (yellow card) 49'	Report		Stadium: Al Maktoum Stadium

23 December 2019	Fujairah	0–1	Baniyas	Ajman
15:50		Report	Pedro 90+3'	Stadium: Ajman Stadium

23 December 2019	Al Dhafra	0–0 (a.e.t.) (9–8 p)	Ajman	Abu Dhabi
18:50		Report		Stadium: Al Nahyan Stadium

23 December 2019	Hatta	1–1 (a.e.t.) (3–4 p)	Sharjah	Al Awir
18:50	Abdullah Abdulqader 71'	Report	Al Hassan Saleh 32'	Stadium: Al Awir Stadium

24 December 2019	Al Bataeh	2–4	Kalba	Sharjah
15:40	Alex 45', 78' (pen.) (red card) 90+1'; Eisa Ali (red card) 49'	Report	Abdulla Al Naqbi 33', 55'; Peniel Mlapa 72' (pen.), 84'	Stadium: Khalid bin Mohammed Stadium

24 December 2019	Shabab Al Ahli	2–1	Al Nasr	Dubai
15:50	Leonardo 54'; Mohammed Marzooq 58'	Report	Álvaro Negredo 71'	Stadium: Zabeel Stadium

24 December 2019	Al Wahda	2–3	Al Jazira	Abu Dhabi
18:50	Hussain Abbas (red card) 19'; Tahnon Al-Zaabi 57'; Sebastián Tagliabúe 90+2'	Report	Ali Mabkhout 6' (pen.); Zaid Al-Ameri 63', 70'	Stadium: Baniyas Stadium

24 December 2019	Khor Fakkan	0–1	Al Wasl	Sharjah
18:50		Report	Lima 70'	Stadium: Sharjah Stadium

== Quarter-finals ==
21 February 2020	Baniyas	1–0	Shabab Al Ahli	Al Ain
16:50	Richard 45+3' (pen.)	Report		Stadium: Khalifa bin Zayed Stadium

21 February 2020	Al Dhafra	2–1	Al Jazira	Abu Dhabi
19:50	Khaled Ba Wazir 54'; Al-Bakhit 120+2'	Report	Keno 62'	Stadium: Baniyas Stadium

22 February 2020	Al Ain	6–5	Al Wasl	Abu Dhabi
17:30	K. Laba 3', 37' (pen.), 73', 85'; Caio 60', 67'	Report	Welliton 9'; Dwubeng 45', 66' (red card) 83'; F. Lima 55' (pen.), 90+7' (pen.)	Stadium: Al Nahyan Stadium

22 February 2020	Kalba	0–2	Sharjah	Ras Al Khaimah
19:30		Report	Suroor 59'; Al-Dhanhani 63'	Stadium: Emirates Club Stadium

== Semi-finals ==
10 March 2020	Sharjah	2–3	Al Ain	Abu Dhabi
17:40	Meloni 12'; Caio Lucas 41'	report	Dzsudzsák 3'; Islamkhan 31'; Caio Canedo 37'	Stadium: Mohammed bin Zayed Stadium

10 March 2020	Baniyas	0–1	Al Dhafra	Abu Dhabi
20:40		report	Jardel 103' (pen.)	Stadium: Baniyas Stadium

== Final ==
Cancelled	Al Ain	v	Al Dhafra	Abu Dhabi
Cancelled				Stadium: Zayed Sports City Stadium
