= Andrija Radovanović =

Serbian footballer

Personal information
- Date of birth: 31 May 2001 (age 25)
- Place of birth: Belgrade, FR Yugoslavia
- Height: 1.82 m (6 ft 0 in)
- Position: Midfielder

Team information
- Current team: Majd
- Number: 19

Youth career
- –2019: Čukarički

Senior career*
| Years | Team | Apps | (Gls) |
| 2019–2022 | Al Ain | 9 | (0) |
| 2020 | → Ittihad Kalba (loan) | 1 | (0) |
| 2022 | Hatta | | |
| 2023–2024 | Masafi | | |
| 2024–2025 | Al-Fujairah | | |
| 2025–2026 | Emirates | | |
| 2026– | Majd | | |
- * Club domestic league appearances and goals as of 30 December 2021

Andrija Radovanović (born 31 May 2001) is a Serbian footballer who plays as a midfielder for Majd in the United Arab Emirates.

== Career statistics ==
=== Club ===
As of 13 June 2020.

| Club | Season | League | | | Cup | | Continental | | Other | | Total | |
| Club | Season | Division | Apps | Goals | Apps | Goals | Apps | Goals | Apps | Goals | Apps | Goals |
|---|---|---|---|---|---|---|---|---|---|---|---|---|
| Al Ain | 2019–20 | UAE Pro League | 5 | 0 | 4 (Note: Appearances in the UAE League Cup) | 0 | 0 | 0 | 0 | 0 | 9 | 0 |
| Ittihad Kalba (loan) | 2019–20 | UAE Pro League | 1 | 0 | 0 | 0 | 0 | 0 | 0 | 0 | 1 | 0 |
| Career total | | | 6 | 0 | 4 | 0 | 0 | 0 | 0 | 0 | 10 | 0 |
