= Ali Al-Haidhani =

Emirati footballer (born 1998)

Ali Al Haidhani علي الحيضاني
Personal information
- Full name: Ali Mohammed Ahmed Al Haidhani
- Date of birth: 7 January 1998 (age 28)
- Place of birth: Emirates
- Height: 1.73 m (5 ft 8 in)
- Position: Right back

Youth career
- -2018: Al Ain

Senior career*
Years	Team	Apps	(Gls)
2018–2021	Al Ain	4	(0)
2021–2022	Al Urooba	1	(0)
2022	Dibba Al-Hisn		
2022–2023	Al Dhaid		
- * Club domestic league appearances and goals

Ali Al Haidhani (Arabic: علي الحيضاني; born 7 January 1998) is an Emirati footballer who plays as a right back.
