= Mohammed Ali Shaker =

Emirati footballer (born 1997)

Mohammed Shaker
Personal information
- Full name: Mohammed Ali Shaker Ali Al-Mahri
- Date of birth: 27 April 1997 (age 29)
- Place of birth: United Arab Emirates
- Height: 1.85 m (6 ft 1 in)
- Position: Centre-back

Team information
- Current team: Khor Fakkan
- Number: 4

Youth career
- -2017: Ajman

Senior career*
Years	Team	Apps	(Gls)
2017–2019	Ajman	22	(1)
2019–2024	Al Ain	39	(1)
2023	→ Al Nasr (loan)	3	(0)
2024–	Khor Fakkan	0	(0)

International career
2019–	United Arab Emirates	2	(0)
- * Club domestic league appearances and goals as of 30 December 2021

Mohammed Ali Shaker Ali Al-Mahri (Arabic: محمد علي شاكر علي الماهري; born 27 April 1997), known as Mohammed Shaker, is an Emirati footballer who plays for the United Arab Emirates national football team and Khor Fakkan as a centre-back.

== Honours ==
Al Ain

- AFC Champions League: 2023-24
