= Bandar Al-Ahbabi =

Emirati footballer (born 1990)

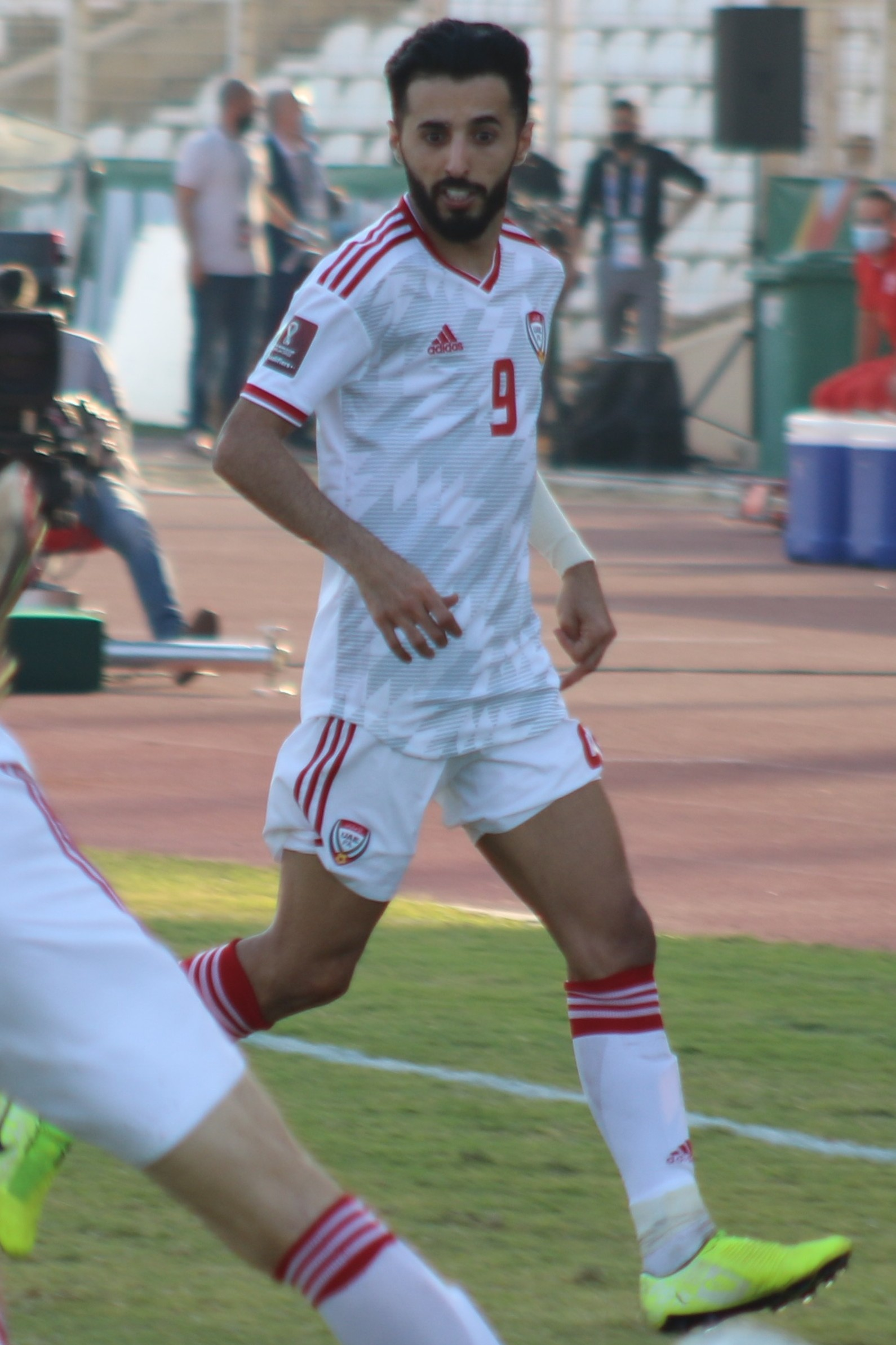
- Al-Ahbabi with the United Arab Emirates in 2021

Personal information
- Full name: Bandar Mohammed Saeed Saleh Al-Ahbabi
- Date of birth: 9 July 1990 (age 36)
- Place of birth: Al Ain, United Arab Emirates
- Height: 1.69 m (5 ft 7 in)
- Positions: Right back; right winger

Team information
- Current team: United FC (Dubai)

Youth career
- Al Ain

Senior career*
Years	Team	Apps	(Gls)
2010–2014	Al Ain	11	(0)
2012–2014	→ Al-Dhafra (loan)	41	(6)
2014–2016	Baniyas	45	(4)
2016–2025	Al Ain	157	(11)
2026-	United FC (Dubai)	0	(0)

International career^{‡}
2015–2023	United Arab Emirates	44	(2)
- * Club domestic league appearances and goals as of 22 September 2023 ‡ National team caps and goals as of 29 March 2021

Bandar Mohammed Al-Ahbabi (Arabic: بندر محمد سعيد صالح الأحبابي; born 9 July 1990) is an Emirati professional association footballer who plays for United FC in the UAE Pro League.

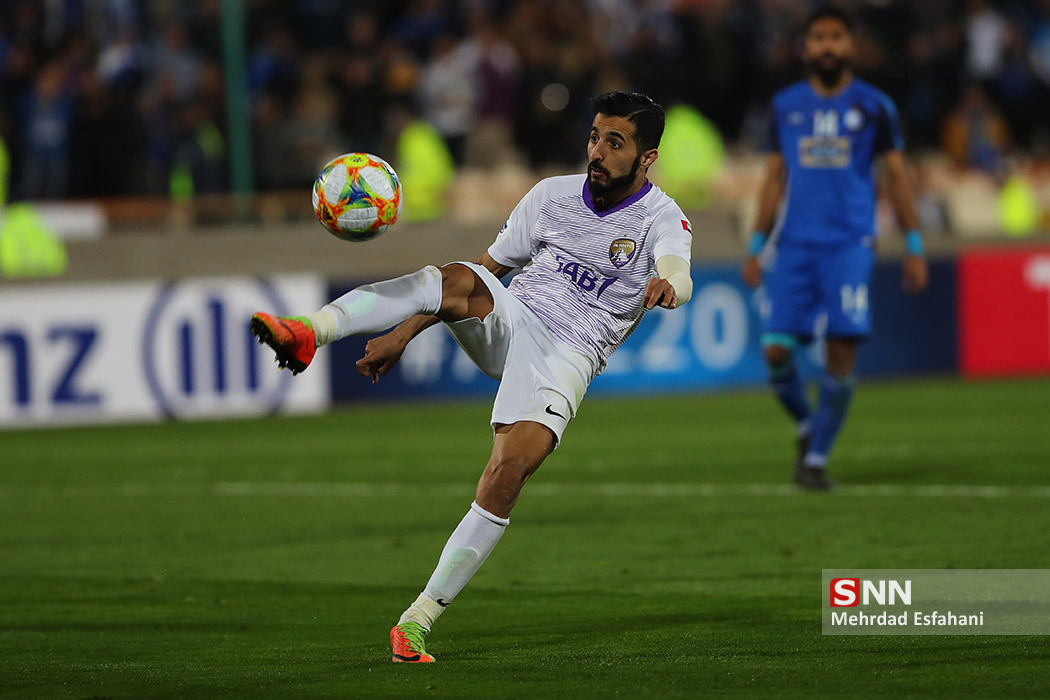
Al-Ahbabi in 2019

== Academic career ==
Bandar began playing football when he was ten years old, where his physical education teacher Ismail helped him enroll for Al Ain FC's youth academy. His future as a professional player was about to end at age 12, when his father withdrew him from the academy because of its influences on his grades. Despite this, his mother persuaded him to play again.

== International career ==
On 23 February 2014, Al Ahbabi was called up the first time to the UAE senior team for a 2015 AFC Asian Cup qualification match against Uzbekistan. He was left out of the starting line-up. On 11 June 2015, he made his debut with the national team in a 3–0 defeat to South Korea, starting the match and wearing the number 21 jersey.

== Career statistics ==
=== Club ===
As of 28 September 2023

Club	Season	League			League Cup			Super Cup			UPC			ACL			Other			Total		
Club	Season	Apps	Goals	Assists	Apps	Goals	Assists	Apps	Goals	Assists	Apps	Goals	Assists	Apps	Goals	Assists	Apps	Goals	Assists	Apps	Goals	Assists
Al Ain
Al Ain	2009–10	0	0	0	1	0	0	0	0	0	0	0	0	0	0	0	—			1	0	0
Al Ain	2010–11	11	0	1	10	3	2	—			0	0	0	5	0	1	—			26	3	4
Al Ain	2011–12	0	0	0	2	0	0	—			0	0	0	0	0	0	—			2	0	0
Al Ain	Total	11	0	1	13	3	2	0	0	0	0	0	0	5	0	1	—			29	3	4
Al Dhafra (loan)
Al Dhafra (loan)	2012–13	20	3	4	5	2	3	—			1	0	0	—			—			26	5	7
Al Dhafra (loan)	2013–14	21	4	5	6	2	5	—			3	0	3	—			—			30	6	13
Al Dhafra (loan)	Total	41	7	9	11	4	8	0	0	0	4	0	3	—			—			56	11	20
Baniyas
Baniyas	2014–15	21	4	3	6	2	2	—			2	0	1	0	0	0	—			29	6	6
Baniyas	2015–16	22	0	2	5	0	0	—			3	0	1	—			—			30	0	3
Baniyas	2016–17	2	0	0	3	0	0	—			—			—			—			5	0	0
Baniyas	Total	45	4	5	14	2	2	0	0	0	5	0	2	0	0	0	—			64	6	9
Al Ain
Al Ain	2016–17	15	0	5	1	0	0	—			2	0	0	5	0	1	—			23	0	6
Al Ain	2017–18	13	0	1	2	0	2	—			0	0	0	7	0	1	—			22	0	4
Al Ain	2018–19	21	1	0	0	0	0	1	0	0	0	0	0	6	0	1	6 (Note: Four Appearances and one goal in FIFA Club World Cup, two appearances in Arab Club Champions Cup)	1	0	34	2	1
Al Ain	2019–20	17	3	12	3	0	1	—			2	0	0	7	0	0	—			29	3	13
Al Ain	2020–21	20	1	4	0	0	0	—			1	0	0	1	0	0	—			22	1	4
Al Ain	2021–22	21	0	5	5	0	2	—			1	0	0	—			—			27	0	7
Al Ain	2022–23	23	3	6	2	0	2	1	0	0	3	0	0	—			0	0	0	29	3	8
Al Ain	2023–24	3	0	1	1	0	0	0	0	0	0	0	0	1	0	1	0	0	0	5	0	2
Al Ain	Total	133	8	34	14	0	7	2	0	0	9	0	0	27	0	4	6	1	0	188	9	45
Career total		230	19	48	52	9	21	2	0	0	18	0	5	32	0	5	6	1	0	337	29	78

=== International goals ===
Scores and results list the United Arab Emirates' goal tally first.

No.	Date	Venue	Opponent	Score	Result	Competition
1.	21 March 2019	Al Nahyan Stadium, Abu Dhabi, United Arab Emirates	Saudi Arabia	1–1	2–1	Friendly
2.	30 August 2019	Bahrain National Stadium, Riffa, Bahrain	Dominican Republic	4–0	4–0	Friendly

== Honours ==
Al Ain

- Arabian Gulf League: 2011–12, 2017–18, 2021–22
- UAE League Cup: 2021–22
- UAE President's Cup: 2017–18
- AFC Champions League: 2023–24
- AFC Champions League runner-up: 2016
- UAE Super Cup runner-up: 2018
- FIFA Club World Cup runner-up: 2018

Individual

- UAEPL Player of the Month: October 2019
- UAEPL Dream Team: 2018–19
- AFC Asian Cup Team of the Tournament: 2019
- UAE Pro League The Golden Ball Best Emirati player of the Year: 2021–22 (UAE Pro League Season awards)
