= George Dwubeng =

Ghanaian footballer

Personal information
- Date of birth: 15 January 2000 (age 26)
- Height: 1.85 m (6 ft 1 in)
- Position: Defender

Youth career
- –2019: Dreams
- 2018–2019: → Politehnica Iași (loan)

Senior career*
Years	Team	Apps	(Gls)
2018–2019	Dreams		
2018–2019	→ Politehnica Iași (loan)	0	(0)
2019–2024	Al-Wasl	29	(1)
2022–2024	Al-Hamriyah		
- * Club domestic league appearances and goals as of 17:17, 1 February 2020 (UTC)

George Dwubeng (born 15 January 2000) is a Ghanaian footballer who currently plays as a defender.

== Career statistics ==
=== Club ===
As of 1 February 2020.

Club	Season	League			Cup		Continental		Other		Total	
Club	Season	Division	Apps	Goals	Apps	Goals	Apps	Goals	Apps	Goals	Apps	Goals
Politehnica Iași (loan)	2018–19	Liga I	0	0	1 (Note: Appearances in the Romanian Cup)	0	0	0	0	0	1	0
Al-Wasl	2018–19	UAE Pro League	9	1	0	0	0	0	1 (Note: Appearances in the Arab Club Champions Cup)	0	10	1
Al-Wasl	2019–20	UAE Pro League	12	0	4 (Note: Appearances in the UAE League Cup)	0	0	0	0	0	6	0
Career total			21	1	5	0	0	0	1	0	27	1
