= Saeed Juma =

Emirati footballer (born 1998)

Saeed Juma سعيد جمعة
Personal information
- Full name: Saeed Juma Hassan Al-Saadi
- Date of birth: 8 July 1998 (age 28)
- Place of birth: Emirates
- Height: 1.73 m (5 ft 8 in)
- Position: Right back

Team information
- Current team: Al Bataeh
- Number: 45

Youth career
- 2010–2017: Al Ain

Senior career*
Years	Team	Apps	(Gls)
2017–2024	Al Ain	103	(1)
2024–	Al Bataeh	0	(0)
- * Club domestic league appearances and goals

Saeed Juma (Arabic:سعيد جمعة) (born 8 July 1998) is an Emirati footballer who plays for Al Bataeh as a right back.

== Personal life ==
Saeed Juma is the brother of the Emirati footballer Fares Juma.

== Career ==
Saeed Juma started his career at Al Ain and is a product of the Al-Ain's youth system. On 29 April 2017, Saeed Juma made his professional debut for Al-Ain against Al-Wahda in the Pro League.

== Honours ==
Al Ain

- UAE Pro League: 2021-22
- UAE League Cup: 2021-22
- FIFA Club World Cup runner-up: 2018
- AFC Champions League: 2023-24
