= COVID-19 pandemic in the United Arab Emirates =

- Disease: COVID-19
- Pathogen: SARS-CoV-2
- Location: United Arab Emirates
- First outbreak: Wuhan, Hubei, China
- Index case: Dubai
- Arrival date: 29 January 2020 (6 years, 6 months and 4 weeks)
- Confirmed cases: 1,067,030 (24 May 2023)
- Active cases: 10,156 (24 May 2023)
- Recovered: 1,054,525 (24 May 2023)
- Deaths: 2,349 (24 May 2023)
- Fatality rate: 0.22%
- Vaccinations: 9,991,089 (total vaccinated); 9,792,266 (fully vaccinated); 24,922,054 (doses administered)

Government website
- covid19.ncema.gov.ae/en

The COVID-19 pandemic in the United Arab Emirates is part of the worldwide pandemic of coronavirus disease 2019 (COVID-19) caused by severe acute respiratory syndrome coronavirus 2 (SARS-CoV-2). The first confirmed case in the United Arab Emirates was announced on 29 January 2020. It was the first country in the Middle East to report a confirmed case.

The first patient, a 73-year-old Chinese woman, was released on 9 February after recovering. The first two deaths were confirmed on 20 March. On 22 March, Dubai started an 11-day sterilisation campaign as an effort to contain COVID-19. Night curfew was imposed four days later while the country began disinfection. School closure was first announced on 8 March for four weeks. Three weeks later, it was announced that schools will be closed until the end of the academic year.

== Background ==
Arabic - Quick Facts on Coronavirus with DR. Ghorayeb

On 12 January 2020, the World Health Organization (WHO) confirmed that a novel coronavirus was the cause of a respiratory illness in a cluster of people in Wuhan City, Hubei Province, China, which was reported to the WHO on 31 December 2019.

The case fatality ratio for COVID-19 has been much lower than SARS of 2003, but the transmission has been significantly greater, with a significant total death toll.

== Timeline ==
=== January 2020 ===
On 29 January, the first case in UAE was confirmed to be a 73-year-old Chinese woman who came to the country on holiday with her family from Wuhan. The family of four, 36-year-old mother, 38-year-old father, 10-year-old child, and the 73-year-old grandmother arrived in the Emirates on 16 January and took the grandmother to a doctor with flu-like symptoms on 23 January, where it was discovered that the family was infected. The announcement led to a sell out of face masks across the UAE.

On 31 January, the fifth case of coronavirus in the UAE was confirmed, in someone who had travelled from Wuhan to Dubai.

=== February 2020 ===
On 8 February, the sixth and seventh cases, of Chinese and a 43-year-old Filipino, were confirmed.

On 9 February, the first patient, a 73-year-old Chinese woman, was released after recovering.

On 10 February, the eighth case was confirmed to be an Indian expatriate who had interacted with a recently diagnosed person.

On 14 February, two more patients recovered and were discharged from the hospital. The two patients were a 41-year-old Chinese father and his eight-year-old boy.

On 16 February, the ninth case was confirmed to be a 37-year old Chinese man.

On 21 February, the tenth and eleventh case was confirmed to be a 34-year-old Filipino national and a 39-year-old Bangladeshi national who had contact with a Chinese national who had been diagnosed with the virus.

On 22 February, the government announced that two more people, a 70-year old Iranian visitor, and his 64-year-old wife, have been diagnosed, taking the total to thirteen.

On 27 February, six more new cases were announced, including four Iranians, one Bahraini, and one Chinese national. On the same day, it was announced that case 2, of the 36-year-old Chinese woman, and another 37-year-old Chinese person were discharged after recovering.

On 28 February, two Italian technicians visiting the country to participate in the UAE Tour, a top level cycling race, were tested positive. 612 people involved in the UAE Tour were quarantined in the homes and the W Abu Dhabi hotel and the Crowne Plaza Abu Dhabi hotel, both in Yas Island, and the two hotels were put on lockdown. The 612 people were all screened and the results were negative.

=== March 2020 ===
On 1 March, six more people tested positive for the coronavirus in the UAE, the Ministry of Health and Prevention said, bringing the total number of infected persons to 27. The patients include two Russians, two Italians, a German and a Colombian citizen, who had been in contact with two Italian participants of the UAE Tour who tested positive for coronavirus at the weekend.

On 3 March, a 16-year-old female Indian student in Dubai tested positive for the coronavirus after contracting it from her parent who came back after traveling abroad. The parent developed symptoms five days after returning to Dubai. Both the student and her family were quarantined.

On 5 March, the Ministry of Health and Prevention confirmed that a 17-year-old male Emirati student has tested positive for coronavirus and showed no symptoms of it. The student is now stable and is receiving necessary healthcare.

On 6 March, two Chinese patients recovered, bringing the total number of recovered cases in the UAE to seven. The two recoveries, a 38-year-old father and his 10-year-old child, were from the first family to contract the virus, and all members of the Chinese family are now virus-free. On the same day, it was announced that 15 cases of different nationalities have tested positive for the virus, taking to 45 the total infections in the country. 13 cases consisted of one individual each from Thailand, China, Morocco and India, two individuals each from Saudi Arabia, Ethiopia, Iran and three individuals from the UAE were detected through early reporting by individuals. All these cases arrived from abroad. Two cases, each from the UAE and Egypt, have been diagnosed with the virus by an active surveillance system for being in close contact with confirmed cases announced previously in connection with the UAE Tour.

On 9 March, the UAE recorded 14 new cases, the Ministry of Health and Prevention said, bringing the total number of reported cases to 59. In a statement, the health ministry said the cases involve four Emiratis, three Italians, two Bangladeshis, two Nepalese, a Russian, an Indian and a Syrian national. On the same day, it was announced that two Emiratis, two Ethiopians and a Thai national recovered from the virus, bringing to 12 the total recovered cases in the country.

On 10 March, the UAE Ministry of Health and Prevention on Tuesday confirmed 15 new cases, bringing the total number of infected people in the country to 74. The 15 cases involve three Italians, two Emiratis, two from the UK, two from Sri Lanka, two Indians, a German, a South African, a Tanzanian, and an Iranian. On the same day, it was announced that five cases recovered, consisting for three Emiratis, one Egyptian and one Moroccan.

On 11 March, 11 new cases were announced, bring the total number of cases in the UAE to 85. The individuals were placed under quarantine as suspected cases subsequent to their entry into the UAE and following required testing and monitoring, the individuals were confirmed to be positive. The 11 individuals diagnosed include two Italians, two Filipinos, one Montenegrin, one Canadian, one German, one Pakistani, one Emirati, one Russian, and one British citizen. On the same day, it was announced that a Bangladeshi, a Chinese, and an Italian person recovered from the virus, bringing the total number of recovered cases in the country to 20.

On 15 March, 12 new cases were confirmed, bringing the total number of cases to 98. The patients are three Indians, and one each from the UAE, the Philippines, South Africa, Australia, China, Lebanon, the UK, Italy, and Iran. On the same day, 3 people have recovered from the virus bringing the total number to 26, the people are two Emiratis and an Indian.

On 18 March, 15 new cases were announced, with the total number of infected people to 113. Patients are from Kyrgyzstan, Serbia, Italy, Netherlands, Australia, Germany, USA, Greece, Russia, Ukraine, Bangladesh, Britain, and Spain.

On 19 March, UAE confirmed 27 new cases of the novel coronavirus on Thursday along with 30 recoveries in total. The total number of COVID-19 cases in UAE stands at 140, with five new cases including three Emiratis, one Syrian and one Sri Lankan.

On 20 March, the first two deaths were confirmed.

On 21 March, there were deaths of two patients with underlying health conditions.

On 22 March, there were seven recoveries, and 13 new cases.

On 23 March, UAE announces 45 new coronavirus cases. Total cases reported in the country are now 198. The government urged people to stay in their homes and only leave home for an emergency or for work, said Ministry of Interior.

On 24 March, four new recovery cases and 50 new cases were confirmed. These new cases were among individuals who had close contact with cases announced previously, as well as people who returned from abroad.

On 25 March, UAE announced 85 new cases, for a total of 333 infections in the country, with seven recoveries reported by the official spokesperson of the UAE health service. Seven people recovered, for a total of 52 recoveries. On the same day, 64 people were arrested for breaking home quarantine after they came in direct contact with people infected with the virus.

On 27 March, 72 new cases and three recoveries were confirmed.

On 28 March, the government announced 63 new cases of COVID-19, raising the total of confirmed cases to 468.

On 29 March, the Ministry of Health and Prevention announced 102 new cases, taking the total cases in the country to 570. The 102 new cases patients consisted of one person from New Zealand, Slovakia, Morocco, Greece, China, France, Germany, Algeria, Iraq, Colombia, Venezuela, and Poland. Two people from Brazil, Sweden, Australia, Ethiopia, Canada, Lebanon, Sudan, Saudi Arabia, and Portugal. Three people from Italy and Ireland. Six people from Egypt. Seven people from the UAE and the Philippines. 16 people from Britain. 30 people from India. On the same day, the three new recoveries were announced takes the total tally of recoveries to 58, and another person died from the virus, taking the toll to three in UAE, until 29 March.

On 30 March, there were 41 new cases, for a total of 611. Two more deaths were announced, for a total of five, and there were three recoveries.

On 31 March, 53 new confirmed cases were announced, for a total of 664, and one death for a total of six.

== Government responses ==
=== Aid and repatriation ===
On 4 March, by the request of their countries' respective governments, 215 people stranded in Wuhan – from countries that include Syria, Iraq, Mauritania, Sudan, Brazil, Egypt, Yemen and Jordan – were flown to Abu Dhabi in a plane equipped with medical facilities.

On 6 April, Abu Dhabi National Exhibitions Company, owner of the ExCeL London conference centre, turned the conference centre into a coronavirus hospital for up to 4,000 patients in the UK. Two planes were chartered by Emirati government authorities to bring 80 Emirati nationals home from the UK.

On 12 April, the UAE announced its intent to arrange repatriation flights for Indians and other citizens stranded in the Emirates and wishing to go back to their countries.

=== Curfew ===
On 26 March, the UAE imposed a night curfew to begin disinfection. On 28 March, the curfews and disinfection were extended to 5 April.

On 31 March, Al Ras area, one of Dubai's densely populated areas that's home to the gold souk and museums, was placed under lock down for two weeks preventing all residents from leaving or entering the area.

On 4 April, a 24-hour curfew was imposed on Dubai, with stricter restrictions on movement, which was reduced to 10-hours from 10:00 pm to 6:00 am starting 24 April.

On 17 May 2021, Dubai's Supreme Committee of Crisis and Disaster Management changed has increased the capacity of entertainment facilities and venues to 70% and the hotels capacity to 100%.

=== Economy ===
On 23 March, the government shut malls for two weeks. Fish, meat and vegetable markets also closed for a renewable period of two weeks.

On 23 April, both Abu Dhabi and Dubai governments announced that some restrictions were being reduced in respect to mall closures with their respective economic departments stating that they were consulting with stakeholders in opening malls in line with government plans for a gradual increase in economic activity in the country. The types of shops allowed to reopen were very limited with regulations to not exceed 30% capacity at any time.

Following the economic downfall of the coronavirus pandemic, the UAE government in July 2020 announced a broad restructuring and merger of more than 50% of its federal agencies, including ministries and departments.

On 4 September 2020, the government announced the sale of $2 billion worth of Islamic and conventional bonds as its first international debt markets sale in the past six years. The government entered the public debt market in order to bolster the emirate's financial market impacted the economic crisis led by the COVID-19 pandemic. The debt sale included a $1 billion tranche for 10-year Sukuk, or 2.763% of Islamic bonds and a $1 billion tranche from a 30-year conventional bond at 4%.

Many blue-collar, migrant workers from Asia and Africa lost their job in UAE due to the economic crisis led by COVID-19. As of 9 October 2020, a release in The Telegraph cited that many migrant workers in the UAE were abandoned without money and food, which led them to spending nights in public parks. White-collar jobs were also impacted by the COVID-19 crisis in UAE, leading many British expats to return home.

A financial survival survey was conducted by the Friends Provident International (FPIL), which concluded that 57% of the workforce in the UAE is financially unprepared to survive 3 months in the unfortunate event of contracting an illness. The conclusion of the survey was drawn based on the responses provided by more than 1,000 UAE employees from across age, gender, nationality, income group, relationship status, and Emirate. It claims that more than two-thirds of Emirati, Arab Expat and Asian-origin workers feared losing their jobs in case of contracting a serious illness as the expats in the UAE are not provided with the same statutory benefits as compared to the Emirati citizens and those provided in their home countries.

Flight suspensions between the UAE and Nigeria from 21 June 2021, due to COVID-19 increased problems for Nigerians working in the UAE. Many complained of visas getting expired and urged the UAE government to offer an early resolution to their problems. Yet, many continue to suffer without any aid from government sources.

=== Education ===
On 3 March, UAE's Ministry of Education announced that schools and universities across the country will close for a month starting 8 March. Spring break, which originally would begin on 29 March, instead began on 8 March and lasted for two weeks. Distance learning was introduced during the remaining two weeks, with pupils learning from home. On 30 March, UAE announced that the 2-week online "distance learning" for schools and universities would continue until the end of the academic year in June.

On 18 March, UAE advisory asking Emirati students abroad to immediately return if their university closes. On 24 March, UAE called for all Emirati students studying abroad to return within 48 hours.

=== Health ===
On 23 January, Abu Dhabi International Airport and Dubai International Airport announced that travelers arriving directly from China would have their temperatures screened.

The Dubai Health Authority (DHA) directed all DHA-licensed hospitals to consider all suspected and confirmed cases as emergencies and patients are to be treated free of charge, including those without insurance. On 22 March, Dubai started an 11-day sterilisation campaign. On 28 March, Abu Dhabi crown prince Mohammed bin Zayed announced that a new testing site had opened.

=== Religion ===
Hand washing COVID-19

On 16 March, prayers at mosques and all other places of worship in the UAE were suspended. Tarawih prayers were not allowed during Ramadan, and the only prayer held in grand Mosques with an Imam and two people was broadcast daily for Muslims to watch at home. Also, several churches in the UAE had announced temporary closures and the suspension of Mass starting 12 March.

=== Telecommunication ===
On 24 March, TRA unblocked Skype for Business, Google Hangouts. TRA explained that residents will now be able to use Microsoft Teams, Zoom and Blackboard, which are available on all networks in the country. Microsoft Skype for Business and Google Hangouts are compatible with fixed Internet networks.

=== Tourism ===
Before January 2021, Dubai promoted itself as an ideal destination for pandemic vacation, as it became the world's first destination to open up for tourism. However, within few weeks, the situation changed, where the tourism department of Dubai put a complete halt on all public places like hotels and restaurants that offered live entertainment. There was a rise in COVID-19 patients, and to accommodate them at hospitals, the authorities suspended all the non-urgent surgeries. Dubai's decision to open tourism for travelers was criticized by a number of countries that blamed the Emirate for spreading the virus abroad.

=== Transportation ===
==== Flights ====
On 22 March, Emirates announced that it will be suspending all passenger flights effective 25 March, but will continue to operate cargo flights for essential goods. All passenger and transit flights were suspended. The suspension of flights from 25 March for an initial 14 days, subject to further directives by the relevant authorities.

On 1 April, Emirates SkyCargo suspended operations at the Al Maktoum International Airport and moved them to the Dubai International Airport.

===== Requirements upon arrival =====
All passengers travelling to Dubai from any point of origin (GCC countries included) must hold a negative COVID-19 RT‑PCR test certificate for a test taken no more than 72 hours before departure, except for travel from Afghanistan, Bangladesh, Indonesia, India, Pakistan and Sri Lanka (for which specific requirements are stated below).

The certificate must be a Reverse Transcription‑Polymerase Chain Reaction (RT‑PCR) test. Other test certificates including antibody tests, NHS COVID Test certificates, Rapid PCR tests and home testing kits are not accepted in Dubai. Travellers must bring an official, digital or printed certificate in English or Arabic to check in – SMS certificates are not accepted. PCR certificates in other languages are acceptable if they can be validated at the originating station. Digital COVID-19 certificates are accepted upon arrival at Dubai International airport verification points.

COVID-19 RT‑PCR test certificates must be issued by an authorised facility in the passenger's departure country. Certificates that have already been presented for travel to another destination can't be used for re‑entry even if they are still within the validity period.

For passengers arriving from the following countries, it is mandatory that the COVID-19 PCR report includes a QR code linked to the original report for verification purposes. The QR code must be presented at check‑in and to representatives of the Dubai Health Authority (DHA) upon arrival in Dubai airports: Sudan, Lebanon, Egypt and Ethiopia.

Passengers arriving in Dubai from the following countries will be required to take another COVID-19 PCR test on arrival at Dubai International airport:

Afghanistan, Angola, Argentina, Bahrain, Bangladesh, Bosnia & Herzegovina, Brazil, Cambodia, Chile, Croatia, Cyprus, Djibouti, Egypt, Eritrea, Ethiopia, Georgia, Ghana, Guinea, Hungary, India, Indonesia, Iran, Iraq, Israel, Ivory Coast, Jordan, Kenya, Kuwait, Kyrgyzstan, Lebanon, Malta, Moldova, Montenegro, Morocco, Myanmar, Nepal, Oman, Pakistan, Poland, Philippines, Qatar, Rwanda, Russia, Senegal, Slovakia, Somaliland, Somalia, South Sudan, Sudan, Syria, Tajikistan, Tanzania, Tunisia, Turkey, Turkmenistan, Ukraine, Uzbekistan, Zimbabwe.

==== Trams and metro ====
On 29 March, the Dubai Metro and Dubai Tram were suspended until 26 April.

Roads

On 27 March, Dubai lifted their ban on trucks weighing 2.5 tonnes. On 31 March, Abu Dhabi installed a disinfection gate at one of its bus stations. On 14 April, Inter-city bus services was suspended in Sharjah until further notice, and Dubai Municipality issued a circular restricting the movement of workers to other emirates; where the transport of labor workers to areas outside of Dubai will be prohibited, as movement will be restricted to the boundaries of the emirate, the purpose of which is to restrict the outside entry of workers not residing in Dubai, and to be implemented to date

=== Censorship ===
The UAE introduced criminal penalties for spreading false information and rumours related to the outbreak. However, it relaxed censorship in other areas, such as allowing VOIP tech for remote learning and work. Companies were allowed to use Microsoft Teams and Zoom for communication.

=== Testing ===
On 22 April, Reuters reported that about hundreds of low-income migrant workers were seen queuing up across the road outside an Abu Dhabi hospital with the temperature outdoors exceeding 35 degrees Celsius, to get tested for Coronavirus. The tests were free of charge only if the person shows symptoms, has travel history, or has come in contact with a positive case. However, if not, the test costs around 370 dirham ($100). The doctors confirmed a sharp daily increase in the number of positive cases specifically in the densely populated communities that house low-income group workers.

Abu Dhabi exhibitions now accept results from 96-hour COVID-19 PCR tests.

=== Vaccine ===
In December 2020, the UAE started its Emirates-wide vaccination campaigns. On 9 December 2020, the Ministry of Health and Prevention (MOHAP) announced that it will be offering the Sinopharm BIBP vaccine, and on 22 December 2020, it announced the emergency registration of the Pfizer–BioNTech vaccine.

For six months, the UAE launched a COVID-19 vaccination campaign, initially with the Sinopharm BIBP vaccine, then adding the Pfizer–BioNTech, Oxford–AstraZeneca and Sputnik V vaccines. The vaccines are offered at a wide range of health centres and hospitals in all of the Emirates, and are given free of charge. The UAE currently offers four vaccines for eligible residents and citizens, one by Sinopharm, the other by Pfizer-BioNTech, the third Sputnik V and the latest by Oxford-AstraZeneca.

In an effort to return to complete normalcy, UAE officials announced that starting 6 June 2021, those who have received the COVID-19 vaccine and have with them a negative PCR test taken within 48 hours will be allowed to attend events and activities in the country. In Abu Dhabi, the Emergency, Crisis and Disasters Committee increased workplace attendance up to 60 percent in government entities and companies starting from 30 May 2021.

By 17 March 2021, more than half of the population of the United Arab Emirates received the Pfizer–BioNTech and Sinopharm vaccines. Around seven million doses were distributed to more than 205 medical centers around the country.

==== Vaccination Timeline ====
In March 2021, the UAE announced it intends on reaching herd immunity. In April 2021, the UAE recorded a vaccination rate of 100.10 doses per 100 people. The UAE's National Crisis and Emergency Management Authority (NCEMA) said that the UAE is at the top of the worldwide vaccine distribution rate, becoming the first country in vaccine distribution per 100 people worldwide. A month later, NCEMA reported that as of 16 June 2021, over 13,964,439 million vaccine doses had been administered since the beginning of the vaccination campaign.

According to figures by NCEMA provided at the end of May 2021, more than 78.11 per cent of residents and citizens in the UAE have been vaccinated against COVID-19. Furthermore, 84.59 percent of those aged 60 and above have been vaccinated. Covering that percentage prompted NCEMA in June 2021 to announce that it will be prioritizing booster shots for the elderly and those with chronic diseases as an additional part of its vaccination efforts. In Dubai, vaccination was also extended to 12 to 15-year-olds for the Pfizer-BioNtech vaccine, according to Dubai's Media Office.

Up to June 2021, the Reuters Covid Tracker reported that nearly 85 percent of the UAE's total eligible population had received at least one dose of a vaccine. The agency calculated that assuming every person needs 2 doses, that is enough to have vaccinated about 70.9% of the country's population.

In Dubai in particular, by the middle of June 2021, about two-thirds of people eligible for vaccination against the virus had received two doses of the vaccine, stated the Dubai Health Authority (DHA). Out of the seven emirates that make up the UAE, Dubai is the most populated, and it has one of the world's busiest airports. DHA deputy director general Alawi Alsheikh Ali has thus said that 83 percent of people aged over 16 - or about 2.3 million people - had now received at least one dose of a vaccine, and that 64 percent had received two doses in the emirate. However, the DHA also reported that nearly 20 percent of those most vulnerable to serious illness have not yet been vaccinated.

==== China-UAE Vaccination Centre ====
In March 2021, Sheikh Abdullah bin Zayed Al Nahyan, Minister of Foreign Affairs and International Cooperation, and Wang Yi, Chinese State Councilor and Foreign Minister, met in the UAE to set up a regional vaccination for Chinese nationals.

In May 2021, the centre was launched and a programme dubbed 'Spring Sprout Action' administered by the Dubai Health Authority allowed Chinese nationals over the age of 16 who hold a short-term visa without UAE residency to receive two doses of the Sinopharm vaccine.

Hundreds of Chinese citizens on visit visas to the UAE took advantage of the programme. The Chinese visitors were the first non-residents to be offered COVID-19 vaccines in the UAE. About 200 registered and received the vaccine at the Safa healthcare centre in Dubai.

To facilitate the vaccination process, the DHA launched a booking facility via its official WhatsApp line. They stated that this was in an effort to facilitate the booking of appointments by using artificial intelligence. Before launching the WhatsApp booking option at the beginning of June 2021, residents booked their vaccine appointment either by telephone or via the official DHA smartphone app.

==== Expired Visa Vaccinations in Abu Dhabi ====
In late June 2021, Abu Dhabi announced that it will be offering free COVID-19 vaccines to everyone with an expired residency visa or expired entry visa. The move was done to help those who were affected by job losses or travel restrictions during the pandemic and so their visas have expired or have been cancelled when they were made redundant.

As a result of confusion among the population, the Abu Dhabi Media Office issued a reminder that the decision does not include holders of valid tourist or visit visas.

Those looking to get the vaccine through this decision can book the Sinopharm and Pfizer vaccines via the Seha app.

== Statistics ==
=== Graphs ===
==== Cumulative number of confirmed cases, recoveries and deaths ====
View source data.

==== Confirmed new cases per day ====
View source data.

==== Confirmed deaths per day ====
View source data.
