= Gabriel Valentini =

Brazilian footballer (born 2000)

Personal information
- Full name: Gabriel Valentini da Silva
- Date of birth: 26 September 2000 (age 26)
- Place of birth: Caxias do Sul, Brazil
- Height: 1.71 m (5 ft 7 in)
- Position: Midfielder

Team information
- Current team: Al Jazirah Al-Hamra
- Number: 10

Senior career*
Years	Team	Apps	(Gls)
2018–2019	Juventude	6	(0)
2019–2022	Al-Nasr	19	(1)
2022	Dibba		
2022–2024	Al Arabi		
2024–	Al Jazirah Al-Hamra		
- * Club domestic league appearances and goals as of 17:17, 26 October 2019 (UTC)

Gabriel Valentini da Silva (born 26 September 2000), commonly known as Gabriel Valentini, is a Brazilian footballer who plays for Al Jazirah Al-Hamra as a midfielder.

== Career statistics ==
=== Club ===
As of 26 October 2019.

Club	Season	League			State League		Cup		Continental		Other		Total	
Club	Season	Division	Apps	Goals	Apps	Goals	Apps	Goals	Apps	Goals	Apps	Goals	Apps	Goals
Juventude	2018	Série B	6	0	1 (Note: Appearances in the Campeonato Gaúcho)	0	0	0	0	0	0	0	7	0
Juventude	2019	Série C	0	0	8	0	1 (Note: Appearances in the Copa do Brasil)	0	0	0	0	0	9	0
Juventude	Total		6	0	9	0	1	0	0	0	0	0	16	0
Al-Nasr Dubai	2019–20	UAE Pro League	3	0	–		3 (Note: Appearances in the UAE League Cup)	1	0	0	0	0	6	1
Career total			9	0	9	0	4	1	0	0	0	0	22	1
