= Mohammed Khalfan (footballer, born 1998) =

Emirati footballer

Personal information
- Full name: Mohammed Khalfan Zayed Al-Harasi
- Date of birth: 28 August 1998 (age 28)
- Place of birth: Al Ain, United Arab Emirates
- Height: 1.71 m (5 ft 7 1/2 in)
- Position: Winger

Youth career
- Al Ain

Senior career*
Years	Team	Apps	(Gls)
2016–2024	Al Ain	33	(2)
2022–2023	→ Al Bataeh (loan)	11	(0)
2023–2024	→ Khor Fakkan (loan)	9	(0)
2024	Dibba Al-Hisn	0	(0)
- * Club domestic league appearances and goals as of 30 December 2021

Mohammed Khalfan Zayed Al-Harasi (Arabic:محمد خلفان زايد الحراصي) (born 28 August 1998) is an Emirati footballer. He currently plays as a winger.

== Personal life ==
Mohamed is the brother of the player Khaled Khalfan and Eisa Khalfan.
