= Rayan Yaslam =

Emirati footballer (born 1994)

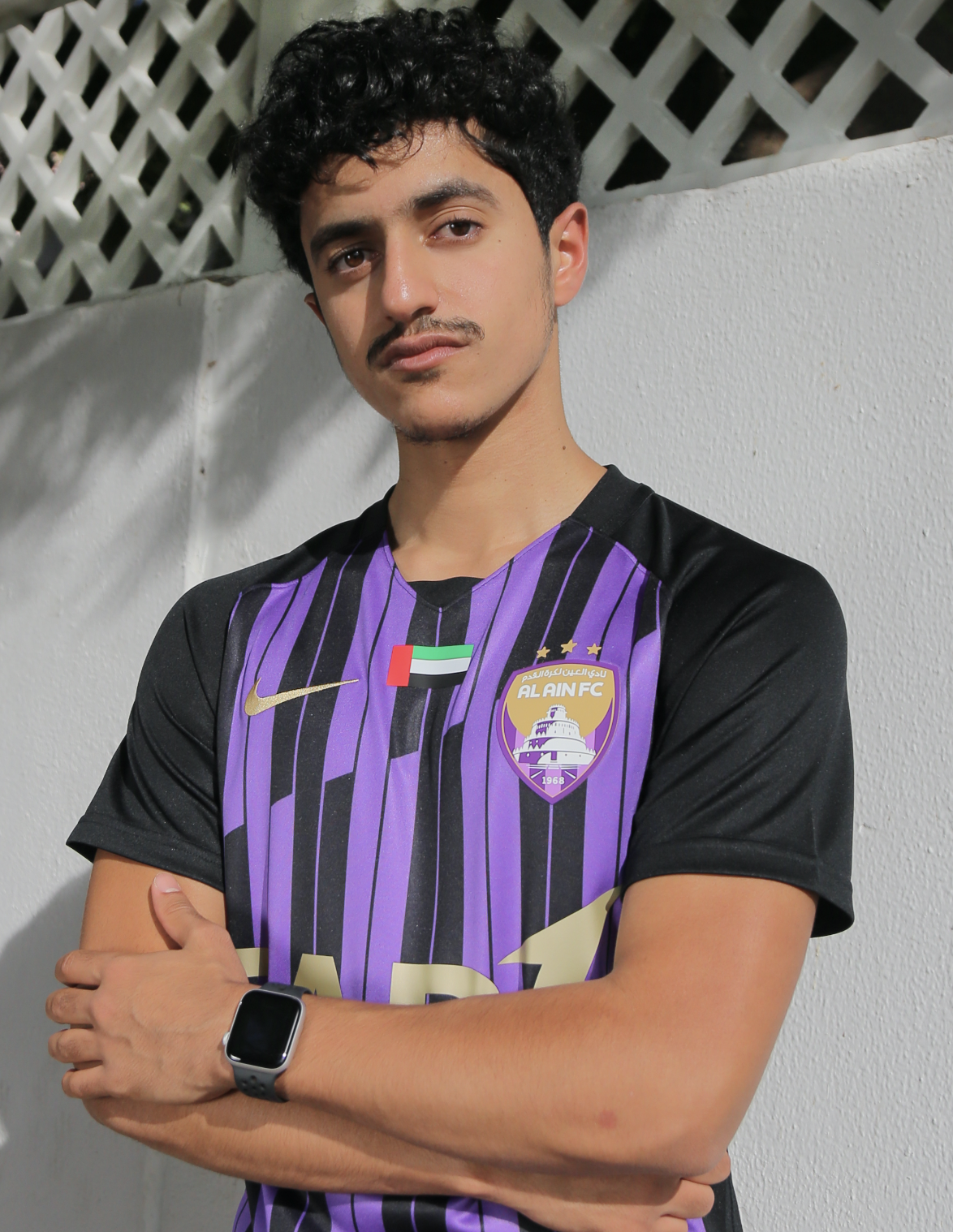
- Yaslam with Al Ain in 2021

Personal information
- Full name: Rayan Yaslam Mohammed Aboudan Al Jaberi
- Date of birth: 23 November 1994 (age 31)
- Place of birth: Al Ain, United Arab Emirates
- Height: 1.67 m (5 ft 6 in)
- Position: Midfielder

Team information
- Current team: Al Dhafra
- Number: 22

Youth career
- Al Ain

Senior career*
Years	Team	Apps	(Gls)
2014–2022	Al Ain	51	(8)
2022–2023	Sharjah	0	(0)
2024–	Al Dhafra	0	(0)

International career^{‡}
2017–	United Arab Emirates	5	(0)
- * Club domestic league appearances and goals as of 25 February 2021 ‡ National team caps and goals as of 25 February 2021

Rayan Yaslam Mohammed Aboudan Al Jaberi (born 23 November 1994), or simply Rayan Yaslam (Arabic: ريان يسلم), is an Emirati professional footballer who plays as a midfielder for Al Dhafra and the United Arab Emirates national team.

== International career ==
Yaslam made his international debut for the United Arab Emirates on 17 December 2017, in a friendly against Iraq.
