= Salem Abdullah (footballer, born 1998) =

Emirati footballer

Salem Abdullah سالم عبد الله
Personal information
- Full name: Salem Abdullah Salmeen Al-Jabri
- Date of birth: 17 September 1998 (age 28)
- Place of birth: Emirates
- Height: 1.83 m (6 ft 0 in)
- Position: Left-back

Youth career
- -2018: Al Ain

Senior career*
Years	Team	Apps	(Gls)
2018–2023	Al Ain	23	(1)
- * Club domestic league appearances and goals as of 30 December 2021

Salem Abdullah Al-Jabri (Arabic:سالم عبد الله الجابري) (born 17 September 1998) is an Emirati footballer who plays as a left back.

== Honours ==
Al Ain

- AFC Champions League: 2023-24
