= Mohammed Helal =

Emirati footballer

Mohammed Helal محمد هلال
Personal information
- Full name: Mohammed Helal Khalifah Al-Nuaimi
- Date of birth: 10 August 1995 (age 31)
- Place of birth: Emirates
- Height: 1.80 m (5 ft 11 in)
- Position: Midfielder

Youth career
- 2009–2014: Ajman

Senior career*
Years	Team	Apps	(Gls)
2014–2019	Ajman	74	(1)
2019–2021	Al Ain	3	(0)
2021–2024	Ajman	24	(2)
2024–2025	Dibba B		
- * Club domestic league appearances and goals

Mohammed Helal (Arabic:محمد هلال) (born 10 August 1995) is an Emirati footballer who plays as a midfielder.

== Career ==
Mohammed Helal started his career at Ajman and is a product of the Ajman's youth system. On 20 December 2014, Mohammed Helal made his professional debut for Ajman against Al-Fujairah in the Pro League, replacing Nasser Abdulhadi.

On 13 June 2019 left Ajman and signed with Al Ain. On 14 February 2020, Mohammed Helal made his Pro League debut for Al Ain against Ittihad Kalba, replacing Bauyrzhan Islamkhan.
