= Omar Yaisien =

French footballer (born 2000)

Personal information
- Date of birth: 8 May 2000 (age 26)
- Place of birth: Colombes, France
- Height: 1.75 m (5 ft 9 in)
- Position: Midfielder

Youth career
- 2005–2019: Paris Saint-Germain

Senior career*
Years	Team	Apps	(Gls)
2019–2022	Al Ain	18	(1)
2022–2024	Al-Hamriyah	2	(0)
2024–2025	Fleetwood United		
2025	Al Jazirah Al Hamra		
2025	Al-Ittifaq	2	(0)

International career
2019	Egypt U23	1	(0)
- * Club domestic league appearances and goals as of 29 July 2025

Omar Yaisien (Arabic: عمر ياسين; born 8 May 2000) is a professional footballer who plays as a midfielder. Born in France, he represents Egypt internationally.

== Club career ==
Having developed in the academy of Ligue 1 side Paris Saint-Germain from the age of five, Yaisien moved to the United Arab Emirates in September 2019, signing a three-year deal with Al Ain. After limited opportunities in his first season, he was linked with a move to Hatta Club in January 2021, and then Egyptian club Smouha at the end of the 2020–21 season, though he ultimately did not join either.

== International career ==
Yaisien was called up to represent the Egypt U23s in a friendly match against the Netherlands U21 in March 2019. The following month, he declared his intention to represent Egypt at international level. Having spent years in the UAE, he later stated that he was open to representing the United Arab Emirates as a naturalised player, in case he didn't get called by Egypt.

== Personal life ==
Yaisien was born in France to an Egyptian father from Minya Governorate and Algerian mother. He is the younger brother of the footballer Abdallah Yaisien.

== Career statistics ==
As of 12 May 2025.

Appearances and goals by club, season and competition
Club	Season	League			Cup		Continental		Other		Total	
Club	Season	Division	Apps	Goals	Apps	Goals	Apps	Goals	Apps	Goals	Apps	Goals
Al Ain	2019–20	UAE Pro League	11	1	5 (Note: Appearances in the UAE League Cup)	1	3 (Note: Appearances in the AFC Champions League)	1	0	0	19	3
Al Ain	2020–21	UAE Pro League	7	0	2	0	0	0	0	0	9	0
Al Ain	2021–22	UAE Pro League	0	0	0	0	0	0	0	0	0	0
Career total			18	1	5	1	5	1	0	0	28	3
