= 2025–26 Al Ain FC season =

Al Ain
2024–25 season
- President: Mohammed Bin Zayed
- Chairman: Hazza Bin Zayed
- Head coach: Vladimir Ivić (from 4 February 2025)
- Stadium: Hazza Bin Zayed
- UAE Pro League: 1st
- President's Cup: Winners
- League Cup: Runners-up
- Gulf Club Champions League: Group stage
- Top goalscorer: League: Kodjo Laba (25); All: Kodjo Laba (31)
Home colours	Away colours	Third colours

The 2025–26 Al Ain Football Club season is the club's 58th in existence and their 51st consecutive season in the top-level football league in the UAE.

== Management ==
Position	Name
Coaching staff
Head coach	(Serbia) Vladimir Ivić
Assistant coaches	(Serbia) Miloš Veselinović (United Arab Emirates) Ahmed Abdullah (United Arab Emirates) Abdulla Khaseeb Alnasri (United Arab Emirates) Salem Al-Kaabi
Chief analyst	(Spain) Carles Martínez
Analyst	(United Arab Emirates) Jamal Al-Karbi
Goalkeeping coaches	(Greece) Christos Kelpekis
Fitness coach	(Greece) Nikolaos Amanatidis
U-21 team head coach	(United Arab Emirates) Ismail Ahmed
Physiotherapist	(Argentina) Santiago Thompson (Brazil) Felipe Perseu Pianca (Egypt) Abdelnasser Aljohny
Club Doctor	(Greece) Nikos Tzouroudis
Nutritionist	(Wales) Tom Maynard
Scout	(Italy) Daniele Di Napoli
Administration staff
Team manager	(United Arab Emirates) Ahmed Al Shamsi
Front office
Sporting Director	(Brazil) Rodrigo Mendes

=== Board of Directors ===
Office	Name
Vice Chairman of the Board of Directors of Al Ain SCC Chairman of the Executive Committee Chairman of the Board of Directors	Sultan bin Hamdan bin Zayed
Supervising Sports affairs	Mohammed Al Mahmoud
Supervising Media affairs	Mohammed Al Ketbi
Supervising of Financial and Administrative affairs	Ziad Amir Ahmed Saleh
Supervising the Academy and Talents sector	Abdullah Mohammed Abdullah Khouri

Source: AlAinClub.ae

== Players ==
N	Position	Nation	Player	Age	Since	Notes
Goalkeepers
1	GK	(United Arab Emirates)	Mohammed Abo Sandah	31	2014	
17	GK	(United Arab Emirates)	Khalid Eisa (C)	37	2013	
35	GK	(United Arab Emirates)	Hassan Sani	20	2025	^{U21}
Defenders
2	DF	(Portugal)	Rafael Rodrigues	24	2025	on loan from Benfica B
3	DF	(United Arab Emirates)	Kouame Autonne	26	2021	
4	DF	(Morocco)	Yahya Ben Khaleq	25	2025	
14	DF	(Slovenia)	Marcel Ratnik	22	2025	
15	DF	(United Arab Emirates)	Erik Jorgens	25	2020	
25	DF	(Egypt)	Ramy Rabia	33	2025	
46	DF	(United Arab Emirates)	Dramane Koumare	21	2024	
97	DF	(Austria)	Adis Jašić	23	2025	
Midfielders
8	MF	(United Arab Emirates)	Mohammed Abbas	24	2021	
10	MF	(Paraguay)	Kaku	31	2023	
20	MF	(United Arab Emirates)	Matías Palacios	24	2022	
30	MF	(United Arab Emirates)	Hazem Mohammad	21	2023	
70	MF	(United Arab Emirates)	Abdoul Karim Traoré	21	2023	
89	MF	(Romania)	Adrian Șut	27	2026	
Forwards
9	FW	(Togo)	Kodjo Laba	34	2019	
13	FW	(Morocco)	El Houssien Rahmi	24	2025	
21	FW	(Morocco)	Soufiane Rahimi	31	2021	
77	FW	(United Arab Emirates)	Rilwanu Sarki	22	2023	^{U23}
—	FW	(United Arab Emirates)	Mohamed Awad Alla	24	2020	

=== Unregistered players ===
Note: Flags indicate national team as defined under FIFA eligibility rules; some limited exceptions apply. Players may hold more than one non-FIFA nationality.

No. / Pos. / Nation / Player; 5 / MF / KOR / Park Yong-woo	No. / Pos. / Nation / Player; 74 / MF / VEN / Yohan González

=== Reserve team ===
Note: Flags indicate national team as defined under FIFA eligibility rules; some limited exceptions apply. Players may hold more than one non-FIFA nationality.

No.	Pos.	Nation	Player
32	DF	UAE	Khalid Al-Hassani
40	DF	UAE	Khalid Al-Baloushi
48	DF	UAE	Yussif Suleiman
50	GK	UAE	Saif Al-Mazmi
53	DF	NGR	Hope Yusuf

No.	Pos.	Nation	Player
56	DF	UAE	Amadou Niang
60	FW	UAE	Jonas Naafo
65	GK	TAN	Abdullah Hamisi
68	MF	CAN	Sorin Ziane
80	MF	NGR	Jushoa Udoh

== Transfers ==
=== In ===
No.	Pos.	Player	Transfer from	Fee	Date	Source
Summer
13	FW	(Morocco) Houssine Rahimi	(Morocco) Raja CA	Undisclosed	26 May 2025	
4	DF	(Morocco) Yahya Ben Khaleq	(Morocco) FUS Rabat	Undisclosed	31 May 2025	
1	GK	(Portugal) Rui Patrício	(Italy) Atalanta	Free Transfer	31 May 2025	
68	FW	(Canada) Sorin Ziane	(Italy) SPAL U19	Undisclosed	2 September 2025	
14	DF	(Slovenia) Marcel Ratnik	(Slovenia) Olimpija Ljubljana	Undisclosed	1 June 2025	
97	DF	(Austria) Adis Jašić	(Austria) Wolfsberger AC	Undisclosed	2 June 2025	
25	DF	(Egypt) Ramy Rabia	(Egypt) Al Ahly	Undisclosed	2 June 2025	
28	MF	(Morocco) Nassim Chadli	(Morocco) Wydad AC	Undisclosed	10 June 2025	
—	MF	(Morocco) El Mehdi El Moubarik	(Morocco) Raja	Loan return	1 July 2025	
Winter
89	MF	(Romania) Adrian Șut	(Romania) FCSB	Undisclosed	10 January 2026	
7	FW	(United Arab Emirates) Mohamed Awad Alla	(Poland) Lechia Gdańsk	Recalled	14 January 2026	
—	MF	(United Arab Emirates) Solomon Sosu	(United Arab Emirates) Al Nasr	Recalled	4 February 2026	

=== Out ===
No.	Pos.	Player	Transfer to	Fee	Date	Source
Summer
29	MF	(Argentina) Gino Infantino	(Italy) Fiorentina	End of loan	31 May 2025	
24	DF	(Argentina) Felipe Salomoni	(Paraguay) Guaraní	End of loan	31 May 2025	
13	MF	(United Arab Emirates) Ahmed Barman	(United Arab Emirates) Khor Fakkan	End of loan	11 June 2025	
23	DF	(United Arab Emirates) Khalid Butti	Unattached	End of loan	1 July 2025	
11	MF	(United Arab Emirates) Bandar Al-Ahbabi	Unattached	End of loan	1 July 2025	
4	DF	(Portugal) Fábio Cardoso	(Portugal) Porto	End of loan	3 July 2025	
7	MF	(Paraguay) Matías Segovia	(Brazil) Botafogo	End of loan	3 July 2025	
18	MF	(United Arab Emirates) Khalid Al-Baloushi	(United Arab Emirates) Dibba	End of contract	3 July 2025	
16	DF	(United Arab Emirates) Khalid Al-Hashemi	(United Arab Emirates) Baniyas	Undisclosed	17 July 2025	
19	MF	(Argentina) Mateo Sanabria	(Brazil) Bahia	€5 million	26 August 2025	

=== Loans in ===
No.	Pos	Player	From	Start date	End date	Ref.
36	DF	(Argentina) Facundo Zabala	(Paraguay) Olimpia	9 June 2025	1 month	
2	DF	(Portugal) Rafael Rodrigues	(Portugal) Benfica B	28 July 2025	End of Season	

=== Loans out ===
No.	Pos	Name	To	Start date	End date	Ref.
41	GK	(Bosnia and Herzegovina) Vedad Alibašić	(United Arab Emirates) Majd		End of Season	
27	MF	(United Arab Emirates) Sékou Baba	(United Arab Emirates) Kalba	26 May 2025	End of Season	
—	FW	(United Arab Emirates) Mohamed Awad Alla	(Poland) Lechia Gdańsk	7 July 2025	End of Season	
22	MF	(United Arab Emirates) Jonatas Santos	(United Arab Emirates) Al Nasr	8 July 2025	End of Season	
90	FW	(United Arab Emirates) Eisa Khalfan	(United Arab Emirates) Kalba	25 July 2025	End of Season	
19	MF	(Morocco) El Mehdi El Moubarik	(Russia) Dynamo Makhachkala	6 August 2025	End of Season	
99	FW	(Republic of the Congo) Josna Loulendo	(Spain) Recreativo Granada	1 September 2025	End of Season	
28	FW	(Morocco) Nassim Chadli	(United Arab Emirates) Baniyas	4 February 2026	End of Season	
11	MF	(United Arab Emirates) Solomon Sosu	(United Arab Emirates) Baniyas	5 February 2026	End of Season	
6	MF	(United Arab Emirates) Yahia Nader	(United Arab Emirates) Baniyas	9 February 2026	End of Season	

== Competitions ==
=== Overview ===
Competition	First match	Last match	Starting round	Final position	Record							
Competition	First match	Last match	Starting round	Final position	Pld	W	D	L	GF	GA	GD	Win %
Pro-League	16 August 2025	16 May 2026	Matchday 1	Winners	26	21	5	0	62	18	+44	80.77
President's Cup	26 October 2025	22 May 2026	Round of 16	Winners	4	4	0	0	16	1	+15	100.00
League Cup	30 August 2025	1 May 2026	Round of 16	Runners–up	7	3	3	1	11	5	+6	42.86
Gulf Club Champions League	30 September 2025	18 February 2026	Group stage	Group stage	6	3	0	3	6	5	+1	50.00
Total					43	31	8	4	95	29	+66	72.09

Last updated: 22 May 2026
Source: Soccerway

=== Pro League ===
Pos	Team	Pld	W	D	L	GF	GA	GD	Pts	Qualification or relegation
1	Al Ain (C)	26	21	5	0	62	18	+44	68	Qualification for AFC Champions League Elite league stage
2	Shabab Al Ahli	26	17	7	2	60	18	+42	58	Qualification for AFC Champions League Elite league stage
3	Al Wasl	26	14	6	6	39	29	+10	48	Qualification for AFC Champions League Elite league stage
4	Al Jazira	26	13	5	8	46	30	+16	44	Qualification for AFC Champions League Elite preliminary stage
5	Al Wahda	26	10	10	6	38	26	+12	40	Qualification for AFC Champions League Two group stage

Source: UAE Pro League
Rules for classification: 1) Points; 2) Head-to-head points; 3) Head-to-head goal difference; 4) Head-to-head goals scored; 5) Goal difference; 6) Number of goals scored; 7) Disciplinary points; 8) Drawing of lots
(C) Champions

==== Results summary ====
Overall								Home						Away					
Pld	W	D	L	GF	GA	GD	Pts	W	D	L	GF	GA	GD	W	D	L	GF	GA	GD
26	21	5	0	62	18	+44	68	10	3	0	32	7	+25	11	2	0	30	11	+19

Last updated: 16 May 2026.
Source: Soccerway

==== Results by round ====
Round	1	2	3	4	5	6	7	8	9	10	11	12	13	14	15	16	17	18	19	20	21	22	23	24	25	26
Ground	H	A	A	H	A	H	A	H	H	A	H	A	H	A	A	H	A	A	H	A	H	H	A	A	H	H
Result	W	W	D	W	W	W	W	D	W	D	W	W	D	W	W	D	W	W	W	W	W	W	W	W	W	W
Position	6	1	2	1	1	1	1	1	1	1	1	1	2	2	2	2	2	1	1	1	1	1	1	1	1	1

Updated to match(es) played on 16 May 2026. Source: UPLeague
A = Away; H = Home; W = Win; D = Draw; L = Loss; P = Postponed

=== UAE President's Cup ===
26 October 2025 Round of 16	Al Hamriyah	0–7	Al Ain	Sharjah
16:55		Report	S. Rahimi 6' (pen.); Rodrigues 13'; Palacios 41'; Niang 68'; Laba 73', 80'; Chadli 90'	Stadium: Khalid bin Mohammed; Referee: Slavko Vinčić

31 January 2026 Quarter-finals	Dibba Al-Fujairah	0–3	Al Ain	Dubai
18:30 GMT+4 (UAE Time)		Report	S. Rahimi 53', 79'; Laba 77'	Stadium: Rashid Stadium; Referee: Halil Umut Meler

22 March 2026 Semi-finals	United	0–2 (a.e.t.)	Al Ain	Abu Dhabi
19:00 GMT+4 (UAE Time)		Report	S. Rahimi 102', 105+3'	Stadium: Al Nahyan Stadium; Referee: Yael Falcón

22 May 2026 Final	Al Jazira	1–4	Al Ain	Abu Dhabi
19:40 GMT+4 (UAE Time)	Fekir 11'	Report	S. Rahimi 15', 20'; Traoré 44'; Erik 90+4'	Stadium: Mohammed bin Zayed; Referee: Raphael Claus

=== UAE League Cup ===
==== Round of 16 ====
30 August 2025 First leg	Al Ain	1–1	Kalba	Al Ain
20:30	Laba 52'	Report	Jović 45'	Stadium: Hazza Bin Zayed; Referee: Kovács István

5 September 2025 Second leg	Kalba	0–0 (a.e.t.) (1–3 p)	Al Ain	Kalba
17:50 GMT+4 (UAE Time)		Report	S. Rahimi 53', 79'; Laba 77'	Stadium: Ittihad Kalba Stadium; Referee: Georgi Kabakov

==== Quarter-finals ====
15 November 2025 First leg	Sharjah	1–3	Al Ain	Sharjah
19:30	Coronado 88'	Report	H. Rahimi 20', 25'; Palacios 100'	Stadium: Sharjah Stadium; Referee: Esteban Ostojich

30 August 2025 Second leg	Al Ain	4–1	Sharjah	Al Ain
20:30	Petrović 17' (o.g.); Laba 21'; S. Rahimi 51'; Palacios 61'	Report	Manaj 30'	Stadium: Hazza Bin Zayed; Referee: João Pinheiro

==== Semi-finals ====
5 December 2025 First leg	Al Nasr	0–3	Al Ain	Dubai
16:50		Report	S. Rahimi 49'; Laba 67'; Rodrigues 75'	Stadium: Al Maktoum Stadium; Referee: François Letexier

13 December 2025 Second leg	Al Ain	0–2 (3–2 agg.)	Al Nasr	Al Ain
19:30		Report	Mensah 6'; Miérez 65'	Stadium: Hazza Bin Zayed; Referee: Tobias Stieler

==== Final ====
1 May 2026	Al Wahda	0–0 (4–2 p)	Al Ain	Abu Dhabi
20:45		Report		Stadium: Mohammed bin Zayed; Referee: Sergey Ivanov

=== AGCFF Gulf Club Champions League ===
==== Group stage ====
===== Group A =====
Pos	Team	Pld	W	D	L	GF	GA	GD	Pts	Qualification	ZAK	QAD	AIN	SIT
1	(Iraq) Zakho	6	4	1	1	9	4	+5	13	Knockout stage	—	3–1	2–0	3–2
2	(Kuwait) Al-Qadsia	6	3	1	2	5	5	0	10	Knockout stage	1–0	—	0–1	2–1
3	(United Arab Emirates) Al-Ain	6	3	0	3	6	5	+1	9		0–1	0–1	—	4–1
4	(Bahrain) Sitra	6	0	2	4	4	10	−6	2		0–0	0–0	0–1	—

Source: GSA
Rules for classification: Group stage tiebreakers

30 September 2025	Al-Ain (United Arab Emirates)	4–1	(Bahrain) Sitra	Hazza bin Zayed Stadium, Al Ain
20:30 UTC+4	Jamal 21' (o.g.); Suleiman 82'; H. Rahimi 88'; Sarki 90+1'	Report	Cavafe 41'	Referee: Faisal Al-Balawi (Saudi Arabia)

22 October 2025	Al-Qadsia (Kuwait)	0–1	(United Arab Emirates) Al-Ain	Mohammed Al-Hamad Stadium, Hawally
21:00 UTC+3		Report	Suleiman 68'	Referee: Salman Falahi (Qatar)

4 November 2025	Zakho (Iraq)	2–0	(United Arab Emirates) Al-Ain	Zakho International Stadium, Zakho
20:00 UTC+3	Attwan 16' (pen.); Adam 33'	Report		Referee: Mohammed Al-Hoaish (Saudi Arabia)

23 December 2025	Al-Ain (United Arab Emirates)	0–1	(Iraq) Zakho	Hazza bin Zayed Stadium, Al Ain
18:30 UTC+4		Report	Al-Gahwashi 53'	Referee: Faisal Al-Balawi (Saudi Arabia)

10 February 2026	Sitra (Bahrain)	0–1	(United Arab Emirates) Al-Ain	Khalifa Sports City Stadium, Isa Town
18:00 UTC+3		Report	Naafo 90+1'	Referee: Omar Al-Yaqoubi (Oman)

18 February 2026	Al-Ain (United Arab Emirates)	0–1	(Kuwait) Al-Qadsia	Hazza bin Zayed Stadium, Al Ain
21:30 UTC+4		Report	Al-Mutawa 50'	Referee: Mohammed Sami Al-Ismail (Saudi Arabia)
