= 2024–25 Al Ain FC season =

Al Ain
2024–25 season
- President: Mohammed Bin Zayed
- Chairman: Hazza Bin Zayed
- Head coach: Hernán Crespo (from 14 November 2023 until 6 November 2024); Leonardo Jardim (from 8 November 2024 until 4 February 2025); Vladimir Ivić (from 4 February 2025)
- Stadium: Hazza Bin Zayed
- UAE Pro League: 5th
- President's Cup: Quarter-finals
- League Cup: Quarter-finals
- AFC Champions League Elite: League stage
- FIFA Intercontinental Cup: Second round
- FIFA Club World Cup: Group stage
- Top goalscorer: League: Kodjo Laba (14); All: Kodjo Laba (19)
Home colours	Away colours	Third colours

The 2024–25 Al Ain Football Club season is the club's 57th in existence and their 50th consecutive season in the top-level football league in the UAE.

== Season overview ==
=== Pre-season ===
On 27 June 2024, Al Ain announced they would be touring in Rabat, Morocco, with four friendly matches against Union de Touarga on 24 July, Kénitra on 1 August, Chabab Mohammédia on 5 August and Raja CA on 10 August.

== Management ==
Position	Name
Coaching staff
Head coach	(Argentina) Hernán Crespo
Assistant coaches	(Argentina) Juan Branda (Argentina) Nicolás Domínguez (United Arab Emirates) Ahmed Abdullah
Chief analyst	(Spain) Carles Martínez
Analyst	(Portugal) Tiago Freire
Goalkeeping coaches	(Argentina) Gustavo Nepote
Fitness coach	(Argentina) Federico Martinetti
U-21 team head coach	(United Arab Emirates) Ismail Ahmed
Physiotherapist	(Argentina) Santiago Thompson (Brazil) Felipe Perseu Pianca (Egypt) Abdelnasser Aljohny
Club Doctor	(Greece) Nikos Tzouroudis
Nutritionist	(Portugal) Ricardo Pinto
Scout	(Italy) Daniele Di Napoli
Administration staff
Team manager	(United Arab Emirates) Ahmed Al Shamsi
Front office
Sporting Director	(Brazil) Rodrigo Mendes

=== Board of Directors ===
Office	Name
Vice Chairman of the Board of Directors of Al Ain SCC Chairman of the Executive Committee Chairman of the Board of Directors	Sultan bin Hamdan bin Zayed
Supervising Sports affairs	Mohammed Al Mahmoud
Supervising Media affairs	Mohammed Al Ketbi
Supervising of Financial and Administrative affairs	Ziad Amir Ahmed Saleh
Supervising the Academy and Talents sector	Abdullah Mohammed Abdullah Khouri

Source: AlAinClub.ae

== Players ==
=== First Team ===
N	Position	Nation	Player	Age	Since	Notes
Goalkeepers
1	GK	(United Arab Emirates)	Mohammed Abo Sandah	31	2014	
17	GK	(United Arab Emirates)	Khalid Eisa (VC)	37	2013	
36	GK	(United Arab Emirates)	Amer Al-Faresi	21	2024	^{U21}
Defenders
3	DF	(United Arab Emirates)	Kouame Autonne	26	2021	
15	DF	(United Arab Emirates)	Erik Jorgens	25	2020	
16	DF	(United Arab Emirates)	Khalid Al-Hashemi	29	2023	
46	DF	(Mali)	Dramane Koumare	21	2024	
50	DF	(United Arab Emirates)	Manea Al Shamsi	25	2021	
66	DF	(United Arab Emirates)	Mansour Al Shamsi	25	2020	
—	DF	(United Arab Emirates)	Khalid Butti	35	2024	
—	DF	(Brazil)	Marlon Santos	31	2024	on loan from Shakhtar Donetsk
Midfielders
5	MF	(South Korea)	Park Youg-woo	33	2023	
6	MF	(United Arab Emirates)	Yahia Nader	28	2018	
8	MF	(United Arab Emirates)	Mohammed Abbas	24	2021	^{U21}
10	MF	(Paraguay)	Kaku	31	2023	
11	MF	(United Arab Emirates)	Bandar Al-Ahbabi (C)	36	2016	
13	MF	(United Arab Emirates)	Ahmed Barman	32	2013	
18	MF	(United Arab Emirates)	Khalid Al-Balochi	27	2018	
20	MF	(United Arab Emirates)	Matías Palacios	24	2022	
21	MF	(Morocco)	Soufiane Rahimi	31	2021	
26	MF	(United Arab Emirates)	Ahmed Al-Qatesh	25	2021	
30	MF	(United Arab Emirates)	Hazem Mohammad	21	2023	^{U19}
70	MF	(Mali)	Abdoul Karim Traoré	21	2023	^{U19}
—	MF	(Morocco)	El Mehdi El Moubarik	25	2022	
Forwards
9	FW	(Togo)	Kodjo Laba	34	2019	
77	FW	(Nigeria)	Rilwanu Sarki	22	2023	^{U19}
90	FW	(United Arab Emirates)	Eisa Khalfan	23	2021	^{U21}
99	FW	(Republic of the Congo)	Josna Loulendo	22	2023	^{U21}
—	FW	(United Arab Emirates)	Mohamed Awadalla	24	2020	^{U21}

=== New contracts ===
Date	Pos	No.	Player	Ref.	Notes
12 July 2024	GK	1	(United Arab Emirates) Mohammed Abo Sandah		2026

== Transfers ==
=== In ===
No.	Position	Player	From	Fee	Date	Ref.
Summer
—	MF	(United Arab Emirates) Mohammed Khalfan	(United Arab Emirates) Khor Fakkan	Loan return	1 July 2024	
—	FW	(United Arab Emirates) Mohamed Awadalla ^{U21}	(United Arab Emirates) Khor Fakkan	Loan return	1 July 2024	
—	DF	(Brazil) Rafael Pereira	(United Arab Emirates) Khor Fakkan	Loan return	1 July 2024	
—	MF	(Morocco) El Mehdi El Moubarik	(Morocco) Raja	Loan return	1 July 2024	
—	DF	(United Arab Emirates) Khalid Butti	(United Arab Emirates) Al Wahda	Free	12 July 2024	
Total				€0 million		

=== Out ===
No.	Pos.	Player	Transfer to	Fee	Date	Source
Summer
22	MF	(United Arab Emirates) Falah Waleed	(United Arab Emirates) Dibba Al-Hisn	End of contract	25 June 2024	
4	DF	(United Arab Emirates) Mohammed Shaker	(United Arab Emirates) Khor Fakkan	End of contract	27 June 2024	
44	DF	(United Arab Emirates) Saeed Juma		End of contract	1 July 2024	
27	MF	(United Arab Emirates) Sultan Al-Shamsi	(United Arab Emirates) Khor Fakkan	End of contract	1 July 2024	
12	GK	(United Arab Emirates) Sultan Al-Mantheri	(United Arab Emirates) Kalba	End of contract	1 July 2024	
—	MF	(United Arab Emirates) Mohammed Khalfan	(United Arab Emirates) Dibba Al-Hisn	End of contract	3 July 2024	

=== Loans in ===
No.	Pos	Player	From	Start date	End date	Ref.
—	DF	(Brazil) Marlon Santos	(Ukraine) Shakhtar Donetsk	3 July 2024	End of season	

== Pre-season and friendlies ==
On 27 June 2024, Al Ain announced they would be touring in Rabat, Morocco, with four friendly matches against Union de Touarga on 24 July, Kénitra on 1 August, Chabab Mohammédia on 5 August and Raja on 10 August.

Win Draw Loss Fixtures

24 July 2024 1	Union de Touarga (Morocco)	v	(United Arab Emirates) Al Ain	Rabat, Morocco

1 August 2024 2	Kénitra (Morocco)	v	(United Arab Emirates) Al Ain	Rabat, Morocco

5 August 2024 3	Chabab Mohammédia (Morocco)	v	(United Arab Emirates) Al Ain	Rabat, Morocco

10 August 2024 4	Raja (Morocco)	v	(United Arab Emirates) Al Ain	Casablanca, Morocco
				Stadium: Stade Larbi Zaouli

== Competitions ==
=== Overview ===
Competition	First match	Last match	Starting round	Final position	Record							
Competition	First match	Last match	Starting round	Final position	Pld	W	D	L	GF	GA	GD	Win %
Pro-League	24 August 2024	TBD 2025	Matchday 1	5th	26	12	8	6	56	32	+24	46.15
President's Cup	TBD	TBD	Round of 16	Quarter Final	2	1	0	1	4	1	+3	50.00
League Cup	18 August 2024	TBD	First round	Second Round	4	3	0	1	9	6	+3	75.00
AFC Champions League	16 September 2024	17 february 2025	League phase	League Phase	8	0	2	6	11	22	−11	0.00
FIFA Intercontinental Cup	22 September 2024	TBD	First round	African-Asian-Pacific Cup Runners-up	2	1	0	1	6	5	+1	50.00
FIFA Club World Cup	June 2025	July 2025	First round	Group Stage	3	1	0	2	2	12	−10	33.33
Total					45	18	10	17	88	78	+10	40.00

Last updated: 27 August 2024
Source: Competitions

=== Pro League ===
Pos	Team	Pld	W	D	L	GF	GA	GD	Pts	Qualification or relegation
3	Al Wahda	26	13	9	4	51	32	+19	48	Qualification for AFC Champions League Elite League stage (Note: Since the winners of the 2024–25 UAE President's Cup, Shabab Al Ahli, had already qualified for the AFC Champions League Elite, the spot given to the UAE President's Cup winners (Champions League Two) was passed to the third-placed team.)
4	Al Wasl	26	13	7	6	51	35	+16	46	Qualification for AFC Champions League Two group stage
5	Al Ain	26	12	8	6	56	32	+24	44	Qualification for AGCFF Gulf Club Champions League group stage
6	Al Nasr	26	11	5	10	45	45	0	38	
7	Al Jazira	26	10	7	9	45	40	+5	37	

Source: UPLeague
Rules for classification: 1) points; 2) head-to-head goal difference; 3) head-to-head goals scored; 4) head-to-head away goals scored; 5) goal difference; 6) number of goals scored; 7) number of away goals scored; 8) head-to-head points; 9) fair play ranking 10) draw

==== Results summary ====
Overall								Home						Away					
Pld	W	D	L	GF	GA	GD	Pts	W	D	L	GF	GA	GD	W	D	L	GF	GA	GD
0	0	0	0	0	0	0	0	0	0	0	0	0	0	0	0	0	0	0	0

Source: Soccerway

==== Results by round ====
Round	1	2	3	4	5	6	7	8	9	10	11	12	13	14	15	16	17	18	19	20	21	22	23	24	25	26
Ground	H	A	A	H	H	A	H	A	H	A	H	A	H													
Result																										
Position																										

Source: UPLeague
A = Away; H = Home; W = Win; D = Draw; L = Loss; P = Postponed

==== Matches ====
The league fixtures were announced on 6 July 2024.

24 August 2024 1	Al Ain	5–1	Khor Fakkan	Al Ain
21:30 GMT+4 (UAE Time)	Bandar Al-Ahbabi (yellow card) 8'; Kaku 14'; Rahimi 42'; Laba 55' 61' 73'; Mohammed Abbas (yellow card) 64'	Report	Lourency (yellow card) 12'; Mattheus Oliveira (yellow card) 44'; Jonathan Viera 66'	Stadium: Hazza Bin Zayed; Referee: (United Arab Emirates) Sultan Abdurazzaq

30 August 2024 2	Al Bataeh	3–3	Al Ain	Sharjah
18:55	Paulinho 45+1'; Álvaro 58' (pen.); Abang 90'; Ganiev (yellow card) 90+11'	Report	Laba 9' (pen.); Mohamed Ahmed 12' (o.g.); Bandar Al-Ahbabi 16'; Fábio Cardoso (yellow card) 67'	Stadium: Khalid bin Mohammed; Referee: (United Arab Emirates) Bader Bujamhoor

26 September 2024 4	Al Ain	4–2	Al Wasl	Al Ain
21:00	Palacios 22' (yellow card) 56'; Bandar Al-Ahbabi 30'; Kouame Autonne 45+4'; Rahimi 68' (pen.)	Report	Ali Saleh (yellow card) 7'; Abdulrahman Saleh (yellow card) 11'; Caio Canedo 36'; Siaka Sidibe 40'; Bouftini (yellow card) 57' (yellow-red card) 74'	Stadium: Hazza Bin Zayed; Referee: (France) Clément Turpin

6 October 2024 5	Al Ain	1–2	Al Wahda	Al Ain
20:45	Rahimi 17' (yellow card) 23'; Segovia (yellow card) 90'	Report	Omar Khribin 40' (pen.) (yellow card) 90+3'; Rúben Canedo (yellow card) 45+2'; Kruspzky 64'; Lucas Pimenta (yellow card) 80'	Stadium: Hazza Bin Zayed; Referee: (Italy) Davide Massa

25 October 2024 6	Al Ain	1–1	Dibba Al-Hisn	Al Ain
17:55	Laba 90+3'	Report	Haddadi 71' (pen.); Suhail Abdulla (yellow card) 90+7'	Stadium: Hazza Bin Zayed; Referee: (United Arab Emirates) Naser AlAli

21 November 2024 8	Al Orooba	2–4	Al Ain	Fujairah
19:30	Trawally (yellow card) 67'; Azadi 73'; Appolinaire Kack 78' (yellow card) 81'	Report	Rahimi 12'; Laba 29' 62'; Mohamed Awadalla 44'; Mohammed Abbas (yellow card) 90+1'	Stadium: Al Sharqi; Referee: (United Arab Emirates) Suhail Abdulla Ali

7 December 2024 9	Al Ain	4–0	Baniyas	Al Ain
19:30	Segovia 33'; Laba 44' 75' 88'	Report		Stadium: Hazza Bin Zayed; Referee: (United Arab Emirates) Adel Al Naqbi

11 December 2024 3	Kalba	3–3	Al Ain	Kalba
21:30	Ghayedi 24' (yellow card) 74'; Moghanlou 54'; Salem Rashid (yellow card) 61'; Rejan Alivoda (red card) 64'; Abdulaziz Al-Hamhami (yellow card) 65'; Ghoddos 76'; Kouadjo Koffi (yellow card) 89'	Report	Kouame Autonne (yellow card) 69'; Laba 79'; Sanabria 81' 90+5'	Stadium: Ittihad Kalba; Referee: (United Arab Emirates) Ahmad Salem Khalfan

15 December 2024 10	Al Jazira	1–3	Al Ain	Abu Dhabi
19:30	Fekir 52' (yellow card) 89'; Khalifa Al Hammadi (yellow card) 71'	Report	Kouame Autonne (yellow card) 50'; Laba 63' 69' 85'; Erik (yellow card) 65'; Park Yong-woo (yellow card) 83'; Rahimi (yellow card) 89'	Stadium: Mohammed bin Zayed; Referee: (Germany) Daniel Siebert

11	Al Ain	v	Sharjah	Al Ain
				Stadium: Hazza Bin Zayed

TBC 7	Al Ain	v	Shabab Al Ahli	Al Ain
TBC		Report		Stadium: Hazza Bin Zayed

TBC 12	Ajman	v	Al Ain	Ajman
TBC		Report		Stadium: Rashid Bin Saeed

TBC 13	Al Ain	v	Al Nasr	Al Ain
TBC		Report		Stadium: Hazza Bin Zayed

=== UAE League Cup ===
==== First round ====
18 August 2024 First leg	Kalba	2–3	Al Ain	Kalba
18:05	Caio Eduardo 79'; Moghanlou 85' (pen.)	Report	Dramane Koumare 19'; Laba 45'; Yahia Nader (yellow card) 45+3'; Sékou Gassama 66'	Stadium: Ittihad Kalba; Referee: (United Arab Emirates) Ahmed Hassan Hussain Bilal

7 September 2024 Second leg	Al Ain	3–1 (6–3 agg.)	Kalba	Al Ain
17:45	Bandar Al-Ahbabi (yellow card) 42'; Segovia 53'; Mohamed Awadalla 77'; Hamid Mohammed (yellow card) 90+2'; Sékou Gassama 90+5'	Report	Yaser Al-Blooshi 28'; Sultan Al-Mantheri (yellow card) 63'; Habib Al Fardan (yellow card) 85'	Stadium: Hazza Bin Zayed; Referee: (United Arab Emirates) Nawaf Alzeyouidi

=== AFC Champions League Elite ===
==== League phase ====
Pos	Team	Pld	W	D	L	GF	GA	GD	Pts	Qualification
1	(Saudi Arabia) Al-Hilal	8	7	1	0	26	7	+19	22	Advance to round of 16
2	(Saudi Arabia) Al-Ahli	8	7	1	0	21	8	+13	22	Advance to round of 16
3	(Saudi Arabia) Al-Nassr	8	5	2	1	17	6	+11	17	Advance to round of 16
4	(Qatar) Al-Sadd	8	3	3	2	10	9	+1	12	Advance to round of 16
5	(United Arab Emirates) Al Wasl	8	3	2	3	8	12	−4	11	Advance to round of 16
6	(Iran) Esteghlal	8	2	3	3	8	9	−1	9	Advance to round of 16
7	(Qatar) Al-Rayyan	8	2	2	4	8	12	−4	8	Advance to round of 16
8	(Uzbekistan) Pakhtakor	8	1	4	3	4	6	−2	7	Advance to round of 16
9	(Iran) Persepolis	8	1	4	3	6	10	−4	7	
10	(Qatar) Al-Gharafa	8	2	1	5	10	18	−8	7	
11	(Iraq) Al-Shorta	8	1	3	4	7	17	−10	6	
12	(United Arab Emirates) Al Ain	8	0	2	6	11	22	−11	2	

Source: Asian Football Confederation
Rules for classification: 1) points; 2) goal difference; 3) number of goals scored; 4) number of matches won; 5) penalty shoot-out if only two teams remain tied and played each other on the final matchday 6) fair play ranking; 7) drawing of lots

Win Draw Loss Fixtures

16 September 2024 1	Al Ain (United Arab Emirates)	1–1	(Qatar) Al-Sadd	Hazza bin Zayed Stadium, Al Ain
20:00 UTC+4	M. Palacios 80'	Report	Afif 45+1'	Attendance: 18,926; Referee: Sadullo Gulmurodi (Tajikistan)

1 October 2024 2	Al-Gharafa (Qatar)	4–2	(United Arab Emirates) Al Ain	Al Bayt Stadium, Al Khor (Note: Al-Gharafa played their home matches at Al Bayt Stadium, Al Khor, instead of their regular home stadium Thani bin Jassim Stadium, Al Rayyan.)
19:00 UTC+3	Joselu 45+2', 48'; Sano 54'; Brahimi 76'	Report	Kaku 56' (pen.); Rahimi 66'	Attendance: 3,878; Referee: Hiroyuki Kimura (Japan)

21 October 2024 3	Al Ain (United Arab Emirates)	4–5	(Saudi Arabia) Al-Hilal	Hazza bin Zayed Stadium, Al Ain
20:00 UTC+4	Rahimi 39', 67', 90+6' (pen.); Sanabria 63'	Report	Lodi 26'; Milinković-Savić 45+2'; Al-Dawsari 45+5', 65', 75'	Attendance: 24,126; Referee: Nazmi Nasaruddin (Malaysia)

5 November 2024 4	Al-Nassr (Saudi Arabia)	5–1	(United Arab Emirates) Al Ain	King Saud University Stadium, Riyadh
21:00 UTC+3	Talisca 5', 90+4'; Ronaldo 31'; Cardoso 37' (o.g.); Wesley 81'	Report	Bento 56' (o.g.)	Attendance: 23,324

25 November 2024 5	Al Ain (United Arab Emirates)	1–2	(Saudi Arabia) Al-Ahli	Hazza bin Zayed Stadium, Al Ain
20:00 UTC+4	Kaku 90+3'	Report	Toney 70', 74'	Attendance: 17,126

3 December 2024 6	Pakhtakor (Uzbekistan)	1–1	(United Arab Emirates) Al Ain	JAR Stadium, Tashkent (Note: Pakhtakor played their home matches at JAR Stadium, Tashkent, instead of their regular home stadium Pakhtakor Central Stadium, Tashkent.)
19:00 UTC+5	Jurakuziev 6'	Report	Rahimi 49'	Attendance: 1,511

3 February 2025 7	Al Ain (United Arab Emirates)	1–2	(Qatar) Al-Rayyan	Hazza bin Zayed Stadium, Al Ain
20:00 UTC+4	Kaku 42'	Report	Trézéguet 50'; Guedes 75'	Attendance: 6,326; Referee: Khalid Saleh Al-Turais (Saudi Arabia)

17 February 2025 8	Al-Shorta (Iraq)	2–0	(United Arab Emirates) Al Ain	Karbala International Stadium, Karbala (Note: Al-Shorta played their home matches at Al-Madina International Stadium and Al-Zawraa Stadium, Baghdad, and Karbala International Stadium, Karbala, instead of their regular home stadium Al-Shaab Stadium, Baghdad.)
19:00 UTC+3	Al-Mawas 50'; Lucas Esquerdinha 90+4'	Report		Attendance: 2,722; Referee: Abdulrahman Al-Jassim (Qatar)

=== FIFA Intercontinental Cup ===
Al Ain qualified for the tournament by winning the 2023–24 AFC Champions League.

==== First round ====
African–Asian–Pacific Cup play-off

22 September 2024 First round	Al Ain (United Arab Emirates)	6–2	(New Zealand) Auckland City	Hazza bin Zayed Stadium, Al Ain
20:00 GST	Cardoso 6'; Gassama 11'; Palacios 45+1'; Rahimi 78', 90+4'; Kaku 90+2'	Report	Lagos 43'; Bevan 54'	Referee: Mustapha Ghorbal (Algeria)

==== Second round ====
African–Asian–Pacific Cup

29 October 2024 Second round	Al Ahly (Egypt)	3–0	(United Arab Emirates) Al Ain	Cairo International Stadium, Cairo
EGY	Abou Ali 32'; Ashour 55'; Afsha 90+2' (pen.)	Report		Attendance: 52,000; Referee: Halil Umut Meler (Turkey)

=== FIFA Club World Cup ===
==== Group stage ====
Pos	Team	Pld	W	D	L	GF	GA	GD	Pts	Qualification
1	(England) Manchester City	3	3	0	0	13	2	+11	9	Advance to knockout stage
2	(Italy) Juventus	3	2	0	1	11	6	+5	6	Advance to knockout stage
3	(United Arab Emirates) Al Ain	3	1	0	2	2	12	−10	3	
4	(Morocco) Wydad AC	3	0	0	3	2	8	−6	0	

Source: FIFA
Rules for classification: Group stage tiebreakers

18 June 2025 Group	Al Ain (United Arab Emirates)	0–5	(Italy) Juventus	Washington, D.C., United States
21:00 EDT (UTC−4)	Traoré (yellow card) 90+3'	Report	McKennie (yellow card) 5'; Kolo Muani 11', 45+4'; Cambiaso (yellow card) 16'; Conceição 21', 58', (yellow card) 60'; Yıldız 31'; Gatti (yellow card) 82'	Stadium: Audi Field; Attendance: 18,161; Referee: Tori Penso (United States)

22 June 2025 Group	Manchester City (England)	6–0	(United Arab Emirates) Al Ain	Atlanta, United States
21:00 EDT (UTC−4)	Gündoğan 8', 73'; Echeverri 27'; Haaland 45+5' (pen.); Khusanov (yellow card) 58'; Bobb 84'; Cherki 89'	Report	Zabala (yellow card) 25'; Rabia (yellow card) 45+4'	Stadium: Mercedes-Benz Stadium; Attendance: 40,392; Referee: Mustapha Ghorbal (Algeria)

26 June 2025 Group	Wydad AC (Morocco)	1–2	(United Arab Emirates) Al AIn	Washington, D.C., United States
15:00 EDT (UTC−4)	Mailula 4'; Mwalimu (yellow card) 68'; Amrabat (yellow card) 83'; Benktib (yellow card) 90+3'	Report	Palacios (yellow card) 10'; Laba 45+1' (pen.); Traoré (yellow card) 45+2'; Kaku 50'	Stadium: Audi Field; Attendance: 10,785; Referee: Drew Fischer (Canada)
