= 2023–24 Al Ain FC season =

Al Ain
2023–24 season
- President: Mohammed Bin Zayed
- Chairman: Hazza Bin Zayed
- Head coach: Alfred Schreuder (from 27 May 2023 until 8 November 2023); Hernán Crespo (from 14 November 2023)
- Stadium: Hazza Bin Zayed
- UAE Pro League: 3rd
- President's Cup: Quarter-finals
- League Cup: Runners–up
- AFC Champions League: Winners
- Top goalscorer: League: Kodjo Laba (12); All: Soufiane Rahimi (23)
Home colours	Away colours
- All statistics correct as of 7 June 2024.

The 2023–24 Al Ain Football Club season is the club's 56th in existence and their 49th consecutive season in the top-level football league in the UAE.

== Kits ==
- Supplier: Nike
- Sponsors: FAB (front) / Solutions Plus (left sleeve) / EIH – Ethmar International Holding (back) / Nirvana Travel & Tourism (Short)

Home	Away	Goalkeeper 1	Goalkeeper 2	Goalkeeper 3

== Club ==
=== Staff ===
Position	Name
Head coach	(Argentina) Hernán Crespo
Assistant coaches	(Argentina) Juan Branda (Argentina) Nicolás Domínguez (United Arab Emirates) Ahmed Abdullah
Chief analyst	(Spain) Carles Martínez
Analyst	(Portugal) Tiago Freire
Goalkeeping coaches	(Argentina) Gustavo Nepote
Fitness coach	(Argentina) Federico Martinetti
U-21 team head coach	(United Arab Emirates) Ismail Ahmed
Physiotherapist	(Argentina) Santiago Thompson (Brazil) Felipe Perseu Pianca (Egypt) Abdelnasser Aljohny
Club Doctor	(Greece) Nikos Tzouroudis
Nutritionist	(Portugal) Ricardo Pinto
Scout	(Italy) Daniele Di Napoli
Team manager	(United Arab Emirates) Ahmed Al Shamsi
Team supervisor	(United Arab Emirates) Abdullah Al Shamsi

Last updated: 14 November 2023
Source: 1

=== The Steering Committee ===
Office	Name
Vice Chairman of the Board of Directors of Al Ain SCC Chairman of the Executive Committee Chairman of the Steering Committee	Sultan bin Hamdan bin Zayed
Members of the Steering Committee	Mohammad Obaid Hammad
Members of the Steering Committee	Awad Al Kaabi
Members of the Steering Committee	Matar Al Darmaki
Members of the Steering Committee	Mohamed Al Mahmood

Source: alainclub.ae

== Players ==
=== First Team ===
N	Position	Nation	Player	Age	Since	Notes
Goalkeepers
1	GK	(United Arab Emirates)	Mohammed Abo Sandah	31	2014	
12	GK	(United Arab Emirates)	Sultan Al-Mantheri	31	2021	
17	GK	(United Arab Emirates)	Khalid Eisa (VC)	37	2013	
36	GK	(United Arab Emirates)	Amer Al-Faresi	21	2024	^{U21}
Defenders
3	DF	(United Arab Emirates)	Kouame Autonne	26	2021	
4	DF	(United Arab Emirates)	Mohammed Shaker	29	2019	
15	DF	(United Arab Emirates)	Erik Jorgens	25	2020	
16	DF	(United Arab Emirates)	Khalid Al-Hashemi	29	2023	
44	DF	(United Arab Emirates)	Saeed Juma	28	2017	
46	DF	(Mali)	Dramane Koumare	21	2024	
50	DF	(United Arab Emirates)	Manea Al Shamsi	25	2021	
66	DF	(United Arab Emirates)	Mansour Al Shamsi	25	2020	
Midfielders
5	MF	(South Korea)	Park Youg-woo	33	2023	
6	MF	(United Arab Emirates)	Yahia Nader	28	2018	
7	MF	(Israel)	Omer Atzili	33	2023	
8	MF	(United Arab Emirates)	Mohammed Abbas	24	2021	^{U21}
10	MF	(Paraguay)	Kaku	31	2023	
11	MF	(United Arab Emirates)	Bandar Al-Ahbabi (C)	36	2016	
13	MF	(United Arab Emirates)	Ahmed Barman	32	2013	
18	MF	(United Arab Emirates)	Khalid Al-Balochi	27	2018	
20	MF	(Argentina)	Matías Palacios	24	2022	
21	MF	(Morocco)	Soufiane Rahimi	31	2021	
22	MF	(United Arab Emirates)	Falah Waleed	28	2018	
26	MF	(United Arab Emirates)	Ahmed Al-Qatesh	25	2021	
27	MF	(United Arab Emirates)	Sultan Al-Shamsi	30	2021	
30	MF	(United Arab Emirates)	Hazem Mohammad	21	2023	^{U19}
42	MF	(Brazil)	Jonatas Santos	24	2019	
70	MF	(Mali)	Abdoul Karim Traoré	21	2023	^{U19}
Forwards
9	FW	(Togo)	Kodjo Laba	34	2019	
77	FW	(Nigeria)	Rilwanu Sarki	22	2023	^{U19}
90	FW	(United Arab Emirates)	Eisa Khalfan	23	2021	^{U21}
99	FW	(Republic of the Congo)	Josna Loulendo	22	2023	^{U21}

=== Unregistered players ===
Note: Flags indicate national team as defined under FIFA eligibility rules; some limited exceptions apply. Players may hold more than one non-FIFA nationality.

No.	Pos.	Nation	Player
—	MF	GHA	Sampson Agyapong
98	DF	UAE	Salem Abdullah

== Transfers ==
=== In ===
No.	Position	Player	From	Fee	Date	Ref.
7	FW	(Israel) Omer Atzili	(Israel) Maccabi Haifa	€2,000,000	9 June 2023	
77	FW	(Nigeria) Rilwanu Sarki ^{U21}	(Nigeria) Mahanaim	Undisclosed	18 June 2023	
14	DF	(United Arab Emirates) Khalid Al-Hashemi	(United Arab Emirates) Baniyas	Undisclosed	20 June 2023	
10	MF	(Paraguay) Kaku	(Saudi Arabia) Al Taawoun	€5,000,000	28 June 2023	
30	MF	(United Arab Emirates) Mohammed Khalfan	(United Arab Emirates) Al Bataeh	Loan return	1 July 2023	
27	MF	(United Arab Emirates) Sultan Al-Shamsi	(United Arab Emirates) Al Nasr	Loan return	1 July 2023	
4	DF	(United Arab Emirates) Mohammed Shaker	(United Arab Emirates) Al Nasr	Loan return	1 July 2023	
33	DF	(Italy) Gianluca Santini ^{U21}	(United Arab Emirates) Masfout	Loan return	1 July 2023	
5	MF	(South Korea) Park Yong-woo	(South Korea) Ulsan Hyundai	€1,000,000	16 July 2023	
–	DF	(Venezuela) Yohan Gonzalez ^{U19}	(Venezuela) Zamora	Undisclosed	19 July 2023	

=== Out ===
No.	Position	Player	To	Fee	Date	Ref.
16	DF	(Croatia) Tin Jedvaj	(Croatia) Lokomotiv Moscow	Loan return	13 June 2023	
10	MF	(Ukraine) Andriy Yarmolenko	(Ukraine) Dynamo Kyiv	Free transfer	13 June 2023	
7	FW	(United Arab Emirates) Caio Canedo	(United Arab Emirates) Al Wasl	Free transfer	13 June 2023	
22	DF	(United Arab Emirates) Saeed Ahmed	(United Arab Emirates) Khor Fakkan	Free transfer	7 July 2023	
23	DF	(United Arab Emirates) Mohamed Ahmed	(United Arab Emirates) Al Bataeh	Free transfer	7 July 2023	
33	DF	(Italy) Gianluca Santini ^{U21}	(United Arab Emirates) Dibba Al-Hisn	Free transfer	11 July 2023	
2	DF	(Colombia) Danilo Arboleda	(Qatar) Al Ahli	Released	14 July 2023	
29	DF	(United Arab Emirates) Omar Saeed	(United Arab Emirates) Khor Fakkan	Free transfer	15 August 2023	

=== Loans in ===
No.	Pos	Player	From	Start date	End date	Ref.

=== Loans out ===
No.	Pos	Name	To	Start date	End date	Ref.
30	MF	(United Arab Emirates) Mohammed Khalfan	(United Arab Emirates) Khor Fakkan	23 July 2023	End of Season	
72	FW	(United Arab Emirates) Mohamed Awadalla ^{U21}	(United Arab Emirates) Khor Fakkan	1 August 2023	End of Season	
34	DF	(Brazil) Rafael Pereira	(United Arab Emirates) Khor Fakkan	18 August 2023	End of Season	
2	MF	(Morocco) El Mehdi El Moubarik	(Morocco) Raja	18 August 2023	End of Season	

== Pre-season and friendlies ==
Win Draw Loss Fixtures

14 July 2023 Friendly	Cotillas C.D. (Spain)	1–10	(United Arab Emirates) Al Ain	La Manga, Spain
12:20		Report		Stadium: La Manga Club Football Stadium; Referee: Kevin Javier Moreno

20 July 2023 Friendly	Deportivo Murcia (Spain)	0–10	(United Arab Emirates) Al Ain	Murcia, Spain
12:20		Report		Stadium: Pinatar Arena; Referee: Alejandro Clemente Ortuño

28 July 2023 Friendly	Racing (Spain)	0–1	(United Arab Emirates) Al Ain	Spain

28 July 2023 Friendly	Intercity (Spain)	0–2	(United Arab Emirates) Al Ain	Spain

6 August 2023 Friendly	Al Ain (United Arab Emirates)	3–1	(Bahrain) Al-Khaldiya	Al Ain
20:30				Stadium: Hazza Bin Zayed

12 August 2023 Friendly	Al Ain (United Arab Emirates)	2–0	(United Arab Emirates) Khor Fakkan	Al Ain
19:30				Stadium: Hazza Bin Zayed

== Competitions ==
=== Overview ===
Competition	First match	Last match	Starting round	Final position	Record							
Competition	First match	Last match	Starting round	Final position	Pld	W	D	L	GF	GA	GD	Win %
Pro-League	18 August 2023	7 June 2024	Matchday 1	3rd	26	14	3	9	54	37	+17	53.85
President's Cup	18 February 2024	3 April 2024	Round of 16	Quarter-finals	2	1	0	1	2	2	+0	50.00
League Cup	30 August 2023	3 May 2024	First round	Runners–up	7	4	0	3	12	6	+6	57.14
AFC Champions League	19 September 2023	25 May 2024	Group stage	Winners	14	9	1	4	34	21	+13	64.29
Total					49	28	4	17	102	66	+36	57.14

Last updated: 7 June 2024
Source: Soccerway

=== Pro League ===
Pos	Team	Pld	W	D	L	GF	GA	GD	Pts	Qualification or relegation
1	Al Wasl (C)	26	21	4	1	70	27	+43	67	Qualification for AFC CLE League stage
2	Shabab Al Ahli	26	18	4	4	73	34	+39	58	Qualification for AFC CLE play off round
3	Al Ain	26	14	3	9	54	37	+17	45	Qualification for AFC CLE League stage (Note: As 2023–24 AFC Champions League winners.)
4	Sharjah	26	10	12	4	53	40	+13	42 (Note: Sharjah are ahead of Al Wahda on head-to-head points: Sharjah 3–2 Al Wahda, Al Wahda 1–1 Sharjah)	Qualification for AFC CL2 group stage
5	Al Wahda	26	12	6	8	45	34	+11	42	

Source: UPLeague
Rules for classification: 1) points; 2) head-to-head goal difference; 3) head-to-head goals scored; 4) head-to-head away goals scored; 5) goal difference; 6) number of goals scored; 7) number of away goals scored; 8) head-to-head points; 9) fair play ranking 10) draw
(C) Champions

==== Results summary ====
Overall								Home						Away					
Pld	W	D	L	GF	GA	GD	Pts	W	D	L	GF	GA	GD	W	D	L	GF	GA	GD
26	14	3	9	54	37	+17	45	6	2	6	29	24	+5	8	1	3	25	13	+12

Last updated: 7 June 2024.
Source: Soccerway

==== Results by round ====
Round	1	2	3	4	5	6	7	8	9	10	11	12	13	14	15	16	17	18	19	20	21	22	23	24	25	26
Ground	H	A	H	A	A	H	A	A	H	A	H	A	H	A	H	A	H	H	A	H	H	H	H	A	H	A
Result	W	W	W	W	L	W	L	W	W	D	L	W	D	W	W	W	D	L	W	L	L	W	L	W	L	L
Position	4	2	1	1	2	1	3	2	2	3	3	2	2	2	2	2	2	3	3	3	3	3	4	3	3	3

Updated to match(es) played on 7 June 2024. Source: UPLeague
A = Away; H = Home; W = Win; D = Draw; L = Loss; P = Postponed

==== Matches ====
The league fixtures were announced on 22 June 2023.

18 August 2023 1	Al Ain	3–2	Baniyas	Al Ain
20:30 GMT+4 (UAE Time)	Kaku 38'; Autonne 49'; H. Abbas 64' (o.g.)	Report	Niakaté 23'; Abunamous 74'	Stadium: Hazza Bin Zayed; Referee: Ahmed Salim Khalfan

26 August 2023 2	Hatta	0–2	Al Ain	Hatta
18:00 GMT+4 (UAE Time)		Report	Laba 10', 26'	Stadium: Hamdan Bin Rashid; Referee: Sultan Abdurazzaq

23 September 2023 3	Al Ain	6–0	Ajman	Al Ain
20:00 GMT+4 (UAE Time)	Rahimi 19', 44'; Y. Nader 31'; Jonatas 68'; Rakan 14' (o.g.); Laba 87'	Report		Stadium: Hazza Bin Zayed; Referee: Daniel Siebert (Germany)

28 September 2023 4	Sharjah	2–3	Al Ain	Sharjah
20:00 GMT+4 (UAE Time)	Caio 50', 54'	Report	Autonne (yellow card) 14' (yellow-red card) 37'; Rahimi 41'; Laba 50'; Jonatas 66'	Stadium: Sharjah Stadium; Referee: Michael Oliver

8 October 2023 5	Al Nasr	1–0	Al Ain	Dubai
20:00 GMT+4 (UAE Time)	Memišević 71'	Report	Jonatas (yellow card) 52' (yellow-red card) 82'	Stadium: Al Maktoum Stadium; Referee: Maurizio Mariani

28 October 2023 6	Al Ain	3–1	Emirates	Al Ain
16:45 GMT+4 (UAE Time)	Al-Ahbabi (yellow card) 10' (red card); Laba 7', 49'; Erik 44'	Report	Iniesta 58' (pen.)	Stadium: Hazza Bin Zayed; Referee: Adel Al Naqbi

2 November 2023 7	Al Wasl	3–1	Al Ain	Dubai
19:30 GMT+4 (UAE Time)	Lima 23'; Bouftini 53'; Canedo 80'	Report	Loulendo 64'	Stadium: Zabeel Stadium; Referee: Slavko Vinčić

26 November 2023 8	Shabab Al Ahli	0–3	Al Ain	Dubai
19:30 GMT+4 (UAE Time)		Report	Laba 9', 82'; Palacios 23'	Stadium: Rashid Stadium; Referee: Raphael Claus

9 December 2023 10	Ittihad Kalba	2–2	Al Ain	Kalba
19:30 GMT+4 (UAE Time)	Vombergar 30'; Bessa 38'; Ghayedi (red card) 50'	Report	Kaku 20'; Jonatas (red card) 24'; Rahimi 71'	Stadium: Ittihad Kalba Stadium; Referee: Artur Soares Dias

16 December 2023 11	Al Ain	0–2	Al Wahda	Al Ain
19:30 GMT+4 (UAE Time)		Report	Khribin 12'; Bakayev 54'	Stadium: Hazza Bin Zayed; Referee: Daniele Orsato

20 December 2023 9	Al Ain	4–1	Khor Fakkan	Al Ain
16:45 GMT+4 (UAE Time)	Laba 7', 37'; Al-Ahbabi 47'; Atzili 64'	Report	Sulaiman 23'	Stadium: Hazza Bin Zayed; Referee: Mohamed Abdalla Alharmoodi

24 December 2023 12	Al Bataeh	1–3	Al Ain	Sharjah
16:45 GMT+4 (UAE Time)	Baba 49'	Report	Laba 36'; Atzili 47'; Kaku 65'	Stadium: Khalid bin Mohammed; Referee: Ahmed Salim Khalfan

25 February 2024 14	Baniyas	0–1	Al Ain	Abu Dhabi
20:00 GMT+4 (UAE Time)		Report	Loulendo 94'	Stadium: Baniyas Stadium; Referee: Sultan Abdurazzaq

29 February 2024 15	Al Ain	5–3	Hatta	Al Ain
17:35 GMT+4 (UAE Time)	Atzili 21'; Al-Shamsi 44', 47'; Kaku 47'; Nader 62'	Report	Gabrielzinho 49'; Egbuchulam 87', 91'	Stadium: Hazza Bin Zayed; Referee: Mohamed Abdalla Alharmoodi

15 March 2024 16	Ajman	0–4	Al Ain	Ajman
22:00 GMT+4 (UAE Time)		Report	Rahimi 19' (pen.), 74', 88'; Traoré 21'	Stadium: Rashid Bin Saeed; Referee: Mohamed Abdalla Alharmoodi

30 March 2024 17	Al Ain	1–1	Sharjah	Al Ain
22:00 GMT+4 (UAE Time)	Laba 53'	Report	Ben Larbi 56'	Stadium: Hazza Bin Zayed; Referee: Yahya Al Mulla

7 April 2024 18	Al Ain	1–3	Al Nasr	Al Ain
22:00 GMT+4 (UAE Time)	Kaku 68'	Report	Taarabt 10'; Medeiros 16'; Jshak 50'	Stadium: Hazza Bin Zayed; Referee: Ahmed Salim Khalfan

11 April 2024 13	Al Ain	2–2	Al Jazira	Al Ain
20:15 GMT+4 (UAE Time)	Autonne 51'; Palacios 61'	Report	Bruno 11'; Coulibaly 94'	Stadium: Hazza Bin Zayed; Referee: Adel Al Naqbi

27 April 2024 21	Al Ain	1–2	Shabab Al Ahli	Al Ain
20:45	M. Abbas 50'	Report	Milivojević 31'; Jesus 61'	Stadium: Hazza Bin Zayed; Referee: Omar Mohamed Alali

7 May 2024 22	Al Ain	1–0	Khor Fakkan	Al Ain
18:05	Al-Shamsi 26'	Report		Stadium: Hazza Bin Zayed; Referee: Bader Bujamhoor

16 May 2024 23	Al Ain	0–1	Ittihad Kalba	Al Ain
18:10		Report	Ghayedi 7'	Stadium: Khalifa bin Zayed; Referee: Adel Al Naqbi

20 May 2024 24	Al Wahda	0–2	Al Ain	Abu Dhabi
21:00		Report	Loulendo 23'; Sarki 69'	Stadium: Al Nahyan Stadium; Referee: Ahmed Salim Khalfan

29 May 2024 20	Al Ain	2–4	Al Wasl	Al Ain
21:00	Rahimi 69'; Yong-woo 84'	Report	Bouftini 7'; Canedo 19', 60'; Lima 40'	Stadium: Hazza Bin Zayed; Referee: Mohamed Abdalla Alharmoodi

2 June 2024 26	Al Jazira	2–1	Al Ain	Abu Dhabi
18:20	Traoré 46'; Akonnor 59'	Report	Hazem.M 21'	Stadium: Mohammed bin Zayed Stadium; Referee: Omar Mohamed Alali

5 June 2024 19	Emirates	2–3	Al Ain	Ras Al Khaimah
18:20	M.Fahad 15'; Alcácer 29'	Report	Al-Balochi 42'; Atzili 43'; Palacios 52'	Stadium: Emirates Club Stadium; Referee: Rashid Abdulla Mohammed

7 June 2024 25	Al Ain	0–2	Al Bataeh	Al Ain
18:20		Report	Abang 32'; A. Khalil 89'	Stadium: Khalifa bin Zayed; Referee: Rawdha Almansoori

=== UAE President's Cup ===
18 February 2024 Round of 16	Al Ain	1–0	Al Wahda	Al Ain
20:20	Palacios 86'	Report		Stadium: Hazza bin Zayed; Referee: Sergei Karasev

3 April 2024 Quarter-finals	Ittihad Kalba	2–1	Al Ain	Dubai
21:30 GMT+4 (UAE Time)	Ghayedi 10', 26' (pen.)	Report	Loulendo 45+3'	Stadium: Zabeel Stadium; Referee: Omar Mohamed Al Ali

=== UAE League Cup ===
==== First round ====
30 August 2023 First leg	Al Bataeh	0–5	Al Ain	Sharjah
18:00		Report	Autonne 11'; S. Al-Shamsi 37'; Atzili 65'; Loulendo 91', 97'	Stadium: Khalid bin Mohammed; Referee: Naser Al Ali

14 September 2023 Second leg	Al Ain	2–1	Al Bataeh	Al Ain
17:30	Rahimi 23'; Atzili 43'	Report	Abang 25'	Stadium: Hazza Bin Zayed; Referee: Adel Al Naqbi

==== Quarter-finals ====
19 October 2023 First leg	Al Nasr	0–2	Al Ain	Dubai
19:30 GMT+4 (UAE Time)		Report	Traoré 28'; Palacios 61'	Stadium: Al Maktoum Stadium; Referee: Ahmed Salim Khalfan

12 December 2023 Second leg	Al Ain	1–2 (3–2 agg.)	Al Nasr	Al Ain
19:30 GMT+4 (UAE Time)	Kaku 88'	Report	Tshibangu 41'; Mohammed 92'	Stadium: Hazza Bin Zayed; Referee: Adel Al Naqbi

==== Semi-finals ====
9 February 2024 First leg	Ittihad Kalba	0–2	Al Ain	Kalba
17:20 GMT+4 (UAE Time)		Report	Rahimi 47'; Abbas 91'	Stadium: Ittihad Kalba Stadium; Referee: Ahmed Salim Khalfan

7 March 2024 Second leg	Al Ain	0–2 (2–2 agg.) (2–0 p)	Ittihad Kalba	Al Ain
17:35 GMT+4 (UAE Time)		Report	Bessa 46', 83'	Stadium: Hazza Bin Zayed; Referee: Yahya Al Mulla

==== Final ====
3 May 2024	Al Wahda	1–0	Al Ain	Abu Dhabi
20:45 GMT+4 (UAE Time)	Pimenta 15'	Report		Stadium: Mohammed bin Zayed Stadium; Attendance: 29,768; Referee: César Arturo Ramos

=== AFC Champions League ===
==== Group stage ====
Pos	Team	Pld	W	D	L	GF	GA	GD	Pts	Qualification	AIN	FEI	PAK	AHA
1	(United Arab Emirates) Al-Ain	6	5	0	1	17	9	+8	15	Advance to round of 16	—	4–1	1–3	4–2
2	(Saudi Arabia) Al-Fayha	6	3	0	3	12	10	+2	9	Advance to round of 16	2–3	—	2–0	3–1
3	(Uzbekistan) Pakhtakor	6	2	1	3	8	11	−3	7		0–3	1–4	—	3–0
4	(Turkmenistan) Ahal	6	1	1	4	6	13	−7	4		1–2	1–0	1–1	—

Source: AFC
Rules for classification: Tiebreakers

19 September 2023 1	Pakhtakor (Uzbekistan)	0–3	(United Arab Emirates) Al Ain	Tashkent
18:00		Report	Laba 11', 66'; Al-Balochi 25'	Stadium: Bunyodkor Stadium (Note: Team is not using their own home stadium.); Referee: Ko Hyung-jin (South Korea)

3 October 2023 2	Al Ain (United Arab Emirates)	4–2	(Turkmenistan) Ahal	Al Ain
20:00	Erik 4'; Rahimi 32'; Laba 41'; Autonne 70'	Report	Tagaýew 58'; Meredov 85'	Stadium: Hazza Bin Zayed; Attendance: 8,126; Referee: Abdullah Jamali (Kuwait)

24 October 2023 3	Al Ain (United Arab Emirates)	4–1	(Saudi Arabia) Al-Fayha	Al Ain
20:00	Autonne 36'; Kaku 45+3', 67'; Rahimi 90'	Report	Al-Harthi 84'	Stadium: Hazza Bin Zayed; Attendance: 7,126; Referee: Hanna Hattab (Syria)

7 November 2023 4	Al-Fayha (Saudi Arabia)	2–3	(United Arab Emirates) Al Ain	Riyadh
20:00		Report		Stadium: King Fahd International Stadium; Attendance: 1,002; Referee: Ma Ning (China)

28 November 2023 5	Al-Ain (United Arab Emirates)	1–3	(Uzbekistan) Pakhtakor	Hazza bin Zayed Stadium, Al Ain
20:00 UTC+4	Khalfan 18'	Report	Erkinov 55', 62'; Ćeran 78'	Attendance: 2,926; Referee: Adham Makhadmeh (Jordan)

5 December 2023 6	Ahal (Turkmenistan)	1–2	(United Arab Emirates) Al-Ain	Ashgabat Stadium, Ashgabat
19:00 UTC+5	Tagaýew 35'	Report	Rahimi 13' (pen.); Atzili 32' (pen.)	Attendance: 9,544; Referee: Kim Jong-hyeok (South Korea)

==== Round of 16 ====
14 February 2024 First leg	Nasaf (Uzbekistan)	0–0	(United Arab Emirates) Al Ain	Markaziy Stadium, Qarshi
19:00 UTC+5		Report		Attendance: 15,186; Referee: Adham Makhadmeh (Jordan)

21 February 2024 Second leg	Al Ain (United Arab Emirates)	2–1 (2–1 agg.)	(Uzbekistan) Nasaf	Hazza bin Zayed Stadium, Al Ain
20:00 UTC+4	Laba 55'; Rahimi 90+2'	Report	Mozgovoy 51'	Attendance: 10,036; Referee: Alireza Faghani (Iran)

==== Quarter-finals ====
4 March 2024 First leg	Al Ain (United Arab Emirates)	1–0	(Saudi Arabia) Al Nassr	Hazza bin Zayed Stadium, Al Ain
20:00 UTC+4	Rahimi 44'	Report		Attendance: 22,326; Referee: Hiroyuki Kimura (Japan)

11 March 2024	Al Nassr (Saudi Arabia)	4–3 (a.e.t.) (1–3 p)	(United Arab Emirates) Al Ain	Al-Awwal Park, Riyadh
22:00 UTC+3	Ghareeb 45+5'; Eisa 51' (o.g.); Telles 72'; Ronaldo 118' (pen.)	Report	Rahimi 28', 45'; Al-Shamsi 103'	Attendance: 23,878; Referee: Ahmed Al-Kaf (Oman)
	Penalties
	Brozović (penalty missed); Telles (penalty missed); Ronaldo (penalty scored); Otávio (penalty missed)		(penalty scored) Rahimi; (penalty scored) Kaku; (penalty scored) Al-Shamsi

4–4 on aggregate; Al Ain won 3–1 on penalties.

==== Semi-finals ====
17 April 2024 (Note: The match was postponed from 16 April due to adverse weather conditions.)	Al Ain (United Arab Emirates)	4–2	(Saudi Arabia) Al Hilal	Hazza bin Zayed Stadium, Al Ain
20:00 UTC+4	Rahimi 6', 26' (pen.), 38' (pen.); Kaku 56' (pen.)	Report	Malcom 49'; S. Al-Dawsari 78'	Attendance: 21,226; Referee: Adham Makhadmeh (Jordan)

23 April 2024	Al Hilal (Saudi Arabia)	2–1 (4–5 agg.)	(United Arab Emirates) Al Ain	Kingdom Arena, Riyadh
21:00 UTC+3	Neves 4' (pen.); S. Al-Dawsari 51'	Report	Erik 12'	Attendance: 18,445; Referee: Ahmed Al-Alili (United Arab Emirates)

Al Ain won 5–4 on aggregate.

==== Final ====
11 May 2024	Yokohama F. Marinos (Japan)	2–1	(United Arab Emirates) Al Ain	Nissan Stadium, Yokohama
19:00 UTC+9	Uenaka 72'; Watanabe 84'	Report	M. Abbas 12'	Attendance: 53,704; Referee: Salman Falahi (Qatar)

25 May 2024	Al Ain (United Arab Emirates)	5–1	(Japan) Yokohama F. Marinos	Hazza bin Zayed Stadium, Al Ain
20:00 UTC+4	Rahimi 8', 67'; Kaku 33' (pen.); Laba 90+1', 90+5'	Report	Matheus 40'

== Statistics ==
=== Overall ===
As of 3 April 2024

No.	Pos.	Nat.	Player	Pro League		President's Cup		League Cup		Champions League		Total		Discipline		Notes
No.	Pos.	Nat.	Player	Apps	Goals	Apps	Goals	Apps	Goals	Apps	Goals	Apps	Goals	Yellow card	Red card	Notes
Goalkeepers
1	GK	(United Arab Emirates)	Mohammed Abo Sandah	0+1	0	0	0	2	0	1	0	4	0	0	0	
12	GK	(United Arab Emirates)	Sultan Al-Mantheri	0	0	0	0	0+1	0	0	0	1	0	0	0	
17	GK	(United Arab Emirates)	Khalid Eisa	16	0	2	0	4	0	9	0	31	0	1	0	
Defenders
3	DF	(United Arab Emirates)	Kouame Autonne	14	1	2	0	5	1	9	0	30	2	5	1	
4	DF	(United Arab Emirates)	Mohammed Shaker	0+5	0	0	0	4	0	2+1	0	12	0	2	0	
15	DF	(United Arab Emirates)	Erik Jorgens	14	1	1	0	6	0	6	1	27	1	5	0	
16	DF	(United Arab Emirates)	Khalid Al-Hashemi	14	0	1+1	0	1+1	0	8+1	0	27	0	3	0	
40	DF	(United Arab Emirates)	Khaled Ali	1	0	0	0	0	0	4	0	5	0	0	0	
44	DF	(United Arab Emirates)	Saeed Juma	3+7	0	0+1	0	2	0	1+4	0	18	0	1	0	
46	DF	(Mali)	Dramane Koumare	3+1	0	1	0	2	0	0	0	7	0	1	0	
50	DF	(United Arab Emirates)	Manea Al Shamsi	0	0	0	0	0	0	0	0	0	0	0	0	
66	DF	(United Arab Emirates)	Mansour Al Shamsi	0+1	0	0	0	0+1	0	1+2	0	5	0	1	0	
Midfielders
5	MF	(South Korea)	Park Youg-woo	14	0	2	0	1+2	0	8	0	27	0	3	0	
6	MF	(United Arab Emirates)	Yahia Nader	10+2	2	1+1	0	1+1	0	7	0	23	2	2	0	
7	MF	(Israel)	Omer Atzili	8+6	3	0+2	0	5	2	2	1	23	6	0	0	
8	MF	(United Arab Emirates)	Mohammed Abbas	3+4	0	1	0	0+3	1	5+4	0	20	1	4	0	
10	MF	(Paraguay)	Kaku	15+1	4	2	0	2	1	7	2	27	7	3	0	
11	MF	(United Arab Emirates)	Bandar Al-Ahbabi	11	1	2	0	5	0	9+1	0	26	1	8	1	
13	MF	(United Arab Emirates)	Ahmed Barman	0+6	0	0	0	4+1	0	2+4	0	17	0	1	0	
18	MF	(United Arab Emirates)	Khalid Al-Balochi	1+5	0	0+1	0	2	0	3+1	1	13	1	2	0	
20	MF	(Argentina)	Matías Palacios	8	1	1	1	3+1	1	4+1	0	18	3	3	0	
21	MF	(Morocco)	Soufiane Rahimi	15	7	2	0	4+2	2	9	8	32	17	4	0	
22	MF	(United Arab Emirates)	Falah Waleed	0+5	0	0	0	2+1	0	0+6	0	14	0	0	0	
26	MF	(United Arab Emirates)	Ahmed Al-Qatesh	0	0	0	0	0	0	0	0	0	0	0	0	
27	MF	(United Arab Emirates)	Sultan Al-Shamsi	1+3	2	0	0	2	1	1+4	1	11	4	1	0	
28	MF	(Ghana)	Solomon Sosu	0	0	0	0	0+1	0	0	0	1	0	0	0	
30	MF	(United Arab Emirates)	Hazem Mohammad	0+5	0	0	0	0+3	0	0+7	0	15	0	3	0	
42	MF	(Brazil)	Jonatas Santos	2+5	2	0	0	2+2	0	2	0	13	2	2	2	
70	MF	(Mali)	Abdoul Karim Traoré	6+5	1	1	0	3+2	1	2	0	19	2	0	0	
88	MF	(Ghana)	Hamid Mohamed	0+1	0	0	0	0+1	0	0	0	2	0	1	0	
Forwards
9	FW	(Togo)	Kodjo Laba	14	12	1+1	0	1+2	0	6	6	25	18	2	0	
90	FW	(United Arab Emirates)	Eisa Khalfan	0+1	0	0	0	0	0	1+3	1	5	1	1	0	
99	FW	(Republic of the Congo)	Josna Loulendo	2+6	2	1	1	3+2	2	1+1	0	15	5	5	0	

=== Goalscorers ===
As of 5 June 2024

Includes all competitive matches. The list is sorted alphabetically by surname when total goals are equal.

Rank	No.	Pos.	Player	Pro League	President's Cup	League Cup	Champions League	Total
1	21	MF	(Morocco) Soufiane Rahimi	8		2	13	23
2	9	FW	(Togo) Kodjo Laba	12			8	20
3	10	MF	(Paraguay) Kaku	5		1	4	10
4	7	MF	(Israel) Omer Atzili	4		2	1	7
5	99	FW	(Republic of the Congo) Josna Loulendo	3	1	2		6
6	20	MF	(Argentina) Matías Palacios	3	1	1		5
6	27	MF	(United Arab Emirates) Sultan Al-Shamsi	3		1	1	5
6	33	DF	(United Arab Emirates) Kouame Autonne	2		1	2	5
9	8	MF	(United Arab Emirates) Mohammed Abbas	1		1	1	3
9	15	DF	(United Arab Emirates) Erik Jorgens	1			2	3
11	18	MF	(United Arab Emirates) Khalid Al-Balochi	1			1	2
11	6	MF	(United Arab Emirates) Yahia Nader	2				2
11	42	MF	(Brazil) Jonatas Santos	2				2
11	70	MF	(Mali) Abdoul Karim Traoré	1		1		2
15	30	MF	(United Arab Emirates) Hazem Mohammad	1				1
15	5	MF	(South Korea) Park Yong-woo	1				1
15	77	FW	(Nigeria) Rilwanu Sarki	1				1
15	11	MF	(United Arab Emirates) Bandar Al-Ahbabi	1				1
15	90	FW	(United Arab Emirates) Eisa Khalfan				1	1
Own goals (from the opponents)				2				2
Totals				54	2	12	34	102

=== Assists ===
As of 5 June 2024

No.	Player	Pro League	President's Cup	League Cup	Champions League	Total
10	(Paraguay) Kaku	6			4	10
15	(United Arab Emirates) Erik Jorgens	6		2	2	10
21	(Morocco) Soufiane Rahimi	2		3	3	8
11	(United Arab Emirates) Bandar Al-Ahbabi	3	1	1	2	7
7	(Israel) Omer Atzili	5				5
18	(United Arab Emirates) Khalid Al-Balochi	2		2		4
9	(Togo) Kodjo Laba		1	2	1	4
20	(Argentina) Matías Palacios	1			2	3
6	(United Arab Emirates) Yahia Nader	1			2	3
8	(United Arab Emirates) Mohammed Abbas	1			1	2
44	(United Arab Emirates) Saeed Juma	1				1
66	(United Arab Emirates) Mansour Al Shamsi	1				1
46	(Mali) Dramane Koumare	1				1
28	(Ghana) Solomon Sosu	1				1
5	(South Korea) Park Youg-woo				1	1
Totals		31	2	10	18	61

=== Clean sheets ===
As of 20 May 2024

Rank	No.	Player	Pro League	President's Cup	League Cup	Champions League	Total
1	17	(United Arab Emirates) Khalid Eisa	5	1	3	3	12
2	1	(United Arab Emirates) Mohammed Abo Sandah	2				2
Totals			7	1	3	3	14

=== Disciplinary record ===
As of 7 June 2024

No.	Pos.	Nat.	Player	Pro League			President's Cup			League Cup			Champions League			Total		
No.	Pos.	Nat.	Player	Yellow card	(yellow card) (yellow-red card)	Red card	Yellow card	(yellow card) (yellow-red card)	Red card	Yellow card	(yellow card) (yellow-red card)	Red card	Yellow card	(yellow card) (yellow-red card)	Red card	Yellow card	(yellow card) (yellow-red card)	Red card
42	MF	(Brazil)	Jonatas Santos	3	1	1										3	1	1
11	MF	(United Arab Emirates)	Bandar Al-Ahbabi	5		1							4			9		1
33	DF	(United Arab Emirates)	Kouame Autonne	5	1								3			8	1	
21	MF	(Morocco)	Soufiane Rahimi	2						1			4			7		
70	MF	(Mali)	Abdoul Karim Traoré	2		1	1									3		1
8	MF	(United Arab Emirates)	Mohammed Abbas	1						1			4			6		
15	DF	(United Arab Emirates)	Erik Jorgens	3			1						2			6		
10	MF	(Paraguay)	Kaku	2									3			5		
99	FW	(Republic of the Congo)	Josna Loulendo	2						1			2			5		
30	MF	(United Arab Emirates)	Hazem Mohammad	2						1			1			4		
5	MF	(South Korea)	Park Youg-woo	2									2			4		
13	MF	(United Arab Emirates)	Ahmed Barman	2									1			3		
28	MF	(Ghana)	Solomon Sosu	3												3		
46	DF	(Mali)	Dramane Koumare	3												3		
16	DF	(United Arab Emirates)	Khalid Al-Hashemi	2									1			3		
20	MF	(Argentina)	Matías Palacios	1						1			1			3		
17	GK	(United Arab Emirates)	Khalid Eisa										2			2		
6	MF	(United Arab Emirates)	Yahia Nader	2												2		
9	FW	(Togo)	Kodjo Laba	2												2		
18	MF	(United Arab Emirates)	Khalid Al-Balochi										2			2		
4	DF	(United Arab Emirates)	Mohammed Shaker							2						2		
77	FW	(Nigeria)	Rilwanu Sarki	1		1										1		1
7	MF	(Israel)	Omer Atzili	1												1		
88	MF	(Ghana)	Hamid Mohamed	1												1		
44	DF	(United Arab Emirates)	Saeed Juma										1			1		
66	DF	(United Arab Emirates)	Mansour Al Shamsi										1			1		
27	MF	(United Arab Emirates)	Sultan Al-Shamsi										1			1		
90	FW	(United Arab Emirates)	Eisa Khalfan										1			1		
Totals				47	2	4	2			7			36			92	2	4

Source: Soccerway.com
Ordered by (red card) , (second yellow card) and (yellow card)
(yellow card) = Number of bookings; (second yellow card) = Number of sending offs after a second yellow card; (red card) = Number of sending offs by a direct red card.

=== Hat-tricks ===
Player	Against	Result	Date	Competition	Round
(Morocco) Soufiane Rahimi	Ajman	0–4 (A)	15 March 2024	Pro-League	16
(Morocco) Soufiane Rahimi	Al Hilal	4–2 (H)	17 April 2024	AFC Champions League	Semi-finals (FL)

^{4} – Player scored four goals.

== Awards ==
Player	Position	Award	Ref.
(Morocco) Soufiane Rahimi	Midfielder	AFC Champions League (2023–24) MVP, Top scorer	
