= 2024–25 UAE Pro League =

50th edition of UAE Pro League

UAE Pro League
- Season: 2024–25
- Dates: 23 August 2024 – 25 May 2025
- Champions: Shabab Al Ahli (9th title)
- Relegated: Dibba Al Hisn; Al Urooba
- Champions League Elite: Shabab Al Ahli; Sharjah; Al Wahda
- Champions League Two: Al Wasl
- Gulf Club Champions League: Al Ain

The 2024–25 UAE Pro League (also known as ADNOC Pro League for sponsorship reasons) was the 50th edition of the UAE Pro League. Al Wasl were the defending champions.

== Personnel and kits ==
Note: Flags indicate national team as has been defined under FIFA eligibility rules. Players may hold more than one non-FIFA nationality.

| Team | Head coach | Captain | Kit manufacturer | Shirt sponsor |
|---|---|---|---|---|
| Ajman | (Serbia) Goran Tufegdžić | (United Arab Emirates) Saoud Saeed | Adidas | Ajman Bank |
| Al Ain | (Serbia) Vladimir Ivić | (United Arab Emirates) Bandar Al-Ahbabi | Nike | First Abu Dhabi Bank |
| Al Bataeh | (Iran) Farhad Majidi | (United Arab Emirates) Mohamed Ahmed | Nike | Majid Al Futtaim Group |
| Al Jazira | (Morocco) Hussein Ammouta | (United Arab Emirates) Ali Khasif | Zat Outfit | Healthpoint |
| Al Nasr | (Netherlands) Alfred Schreuder | (United Arab Emirates) Ahmed Shambih | Adidas | Emirates Islamic |
| Al Urooba | (United Arab Emirates) Abdulaziz Al-Hashmi (caretaker) | (United Arab Emirates) Mohanad Khamis Obaid | Uhlsport | Emaar Properties |
| Al Wahda | (Slovenia) Darko Milanič | TBA | Adidas | Volkswagen |
| Al Wasl | (Serbia) Miloš Milojević | TBA | Macron | Dubai Real Estate Centre |
| Baniyas | (Romania) Daniel Isăilă | (United Arab Emirates) Fawaz Awana | Macron | ADIB |
| Dibba Al Hisn | (United Arab Emirates) Hassan Al-Abdooli | (United Arab Emirates) Khalid Abdullah | Umbro | Emirates NBD |
| Ittihad Kalba | (Serbia) Vuk Rašović | (United Arab Emirates) Abdusalam Mohammed | Nike | Shurooq |
| Khor Fakkan | (Spain) Joaquín Gil (caretaker) | (United Arab Emirates) Masoud Sulaiman | Macron | ADNOC |
| Shabab Al Ahli | (Portugal) Paulo Sousa | (United Arab Emirates) Majed Naser | Nike | Mai Dubai |
| Sharjah | (Romania) Cosmin Olăroiu | (United Arab Emirates) Shahin Abdulrahman | Adidas | SAIF Zone |

== Foreign players ==
All clubs can register foreigners as many as they want but can only include five professionals in each team rosters. Players in the age of under-23 (U23) do not counted as professionals and players who have received Emirati citizenship are deemed as local players.

- Players name in **bold** indicates the player is registered during the mid-season transfer window.
- Players in italics were out of the squad or left the club within the season, after the pre-season transfer window, or in the mid-season transfer window, and at least had one appearance.

| Club | Player 1 | Player 2 | Player 3 | Player 4 | Player 5 | Unregistered players | Former players |
|---|---|---|---|---|---|---|---|
| Ajman | (Bahrain) **Ali Madan** | (Jamaica) Junior Flemmings | (Morocco) Mohamed Souboul | (Morocco) Walid Azaro | (Serbia) Miloš Kosanović | | (Morocco) Abdelhamid Sabiri (Morocco) Ayman El Hassouni (Tunisia) Haykeul Chikhaoui |
| Al Ain | (Morocco) Soufiane Rahimi | (Paraguay) Kaku | (Portugal) Fábio Cardoso | (South Korea) Park Yong-woo | (Togo) Kodjo Fo-Doh Laba | | |
| Al Bataeh | (Brazil) Paulinho | (Cameroon) Anatole Abang | (Cape Verde) Diney | (Ivory Coast) Ulrich Meleke | (Uzbekistan) Azizjon Ganiev | | |
| Al Jazira | (Argentina) Ramón Miérez | (Democratic Republic of the Congo) Neeskens Kebano | (Egypt) Mohamed Elneny | (France) Nabil Fekir | (Netherlands) Karim Rekik | | |
| Al Nasr | (Belgium) Othmane Boussaid | (Bosnia and Herzegovina) Samir Memišević | (Brazil) **Mattheus Oliveira** | (Netherlands) Leroy Fer | (Switzerland) **Haris Seferovic** | (Italy) Manolo Gabbiadini | (Morocco) Adel Taarabt |
| Al Urooba | (Brazil) **Héber** | (Cameroon) Petrus Boumal | (Mozambique) **Witi** | (Nigeria) **Viv Solomon-Otabor** | (Slovakia) **Filip Kiss** | (Brazil) Paulo Ricardo (The Gambia) Bubacarr Trawally | (Cameroon) Appolinaire Kack (Iran) Mohammad Reza Azadi |
| Al Wahda | (Colombia) Kevin Agudelo | (Iran) Ahmad Nourollahi | (Iran) **Mohammad Ghorbani** | (Syria) Omar Khribin | (Uzbekistan) Khojimat Erkinov | | (Nigeria) Philip Otele |
| Al Wasl | (Brazil) **João Pedro** | (Morocco) **Anas Zniti** | (Morocco) Soufiane Bouftini | (South Korea) Jung Seung-hyun | (Serbia) Srđan Mijailović | (Argentina) Gerónimo Poblete (Colombia) Alexis Pérez | (Nigeria) Isaac Success (Switzerland) Haris Seferovic |
| Baniyas | (Argentina) Juan Bauza | (Democratic Republic of the Congo) Arnaud Lusamba | (Mali) Youssoufou Niakaté | (Romania) Andrei Burcă | (Serbia) Lazar Marković | | |
| Dibba Al Hisn | (Cameroon) Pierre Kunde | (Guinea) Ibrahima Cissé | (Romania) **Alexandru Mățan** | (Tunisia) Haythem Jouini | (Tunisia) Oussama Haddadi | | (Brazil) Danielzinho (Guinea-Bissau) João Pedro (Mozambique) Witi |
| Ittihad Kalba | (Brazil) Daniel Bessa | (Iran) Mehdi Ghayedi | (Iran) Saman Ghoddos | (Iran) Shahriyar Moghanlou | (Slovenia) Miha Blažič | | (Slovakia) Filip Kiss |
| Khor Fakkan | (Brazil) Lourency | (Morocco) **Tarik Tissoudali** | (Portugal) **Aylton Boa Morte** | (South Korea) Kwon Kyung-won | (South Korea) Won Du-jae | | (Brazil) Mattheus Oliveira (Brazil) Pedro Henrique (South Africa) Thulani Serero (Spain) Jonathan Viera |
| Shabab Al Ahli | (Iran) Saeid Ezatolahi | (Iran) Sardar Azmoun | (Israel) Mu'nas Dabbur | (Serbia) Bogdan Planić | (Serbia) Luka Milivojević | (Brazil) Iago Santos | |
| Sharjah | (Croatia) Darko Nejašmić | (Morocco) **Adel Taarabt** | (South Korea) Cho Yu-min | (Suriname) Tyrone Conraad | (Tunisia) Firas Ben Larbi | (Spain) Paco Alcácer | |

== League table ==
| Pos | Team | Pld | W | D | L | GF | GA | GD | Pts | Qualification or relegation |
|---|---|---|---|---|---|---|---|---|---|---|
| 1 | Shabab Al Ahli (C) | 26 | 19 | 6 | 1 | 57 | 22 | +35 | 63 | Qualification for AFC Champions League Elite League stage (Note: Since the winners of the 2024–25 UAE President's Cup, Shabab Al Ahli, had already qualified for the AFC Champions League Elite, the spot given to the UAE President's Cup winners (Champions League Two) was passed to the third-placed team.) |
| 2 | Sharjah | 26 | 16 | 3 | 7 | 44 | 22 | +22 | 51 | Qualification for AFC Champions League Elite League stage |
| 3 | Al Wahda | 26 | 13 | 9 | 4 | 51 | 32 | +19 | 48 | Qualification for AFC Champions League Elite League stage |
| 4 | Al Wasl | 26 | 13 | 7 | 6 | 51 | 35 | +16 | 46 | Qualification for AFC Champions League Two group stage |
| 5 | Al Ain | 26 | 12 | 8 | 6 | 56 | 32 | +24 | 44 | Qualification for AGCFF Gulf Club Champions League group stage |
| 6 | Al Nasr | 26 | 11 | 5 | 10 | 45 | 45 | 0 | 38 | |
| 7 | Al Jazira | 26 | 10 | 7 | 9 | 45 | 40 | +5 | 37 | |
| 8 | Khor Fakkan | 26 | 9 | 6 | 11 | 41 | 52 | −11 | 33 | |
| 9 | Kalba | 26 | 8 | 8 | 10 | 39 | 38 | +1 | 32 | |
| 10 | Ajman | 26 | 9 | 4 | 13 | 40 | 46 | −6 | 31 | |
| 11 | Al Bataeh | 26 | 7 | 6 | 13 | 30 | 45 | −15 | 27 | |
| 12 | Baniyas | 26 | 7 | 6 | 13 | 30 | 53 | −23 | 27 | |
| 13 | Dibba Al Hisn (R) | 26 | 4 | 4 | 18 | 29 | 56 | −27 | 16 | Relegation to UAE Division 1 |
| 14 | Al Urooba (R) | 26 | 4 | 1 | 21 | 24 | 64 | −40 | 13 | Relegation to UAE Division 1 |

Source: UPLeague
Rules for classification: 1) points; 2) head-to-head goal difference; 3) head-to-head goals scored; 4) head-to-head away goals scored; 5) goal difference; 6) number of goals scored; 7) number of away goals scored; 8) head-to-head points; 9) fair play ranking 10) draw
(C) Champions; (R) Relegated

== Results ==
| Home \ Away | AJM | AIN | BTH | JAZ | NAS | URO | WAH | WAS | YAS | DAH | KAL | KHF | SAD | SHR |
|---|---|---|---|---|---|---|---|---|---|---|---|---|---|---|
| Ajman | | 4–2 | 2–1 | 1–1 | 2–1 | 2–3 | 4–3 | 0–0 | 2–3 | 5–1 | 2–3 | 4–1 | 1–2 | 0–1 |
| Al Ain | 0–0 | | 2–1 | 1–1 | 4–1 | 3–0 | 1–2 | 4–2 | 4–0 | 1–1 | 3–1 | 5–1 | 0–1 | 0–0 |
| Al Bataeh | 1–1 | 3–3 | | 0–3 | 3–4 | 1–0 | 1–3 | 1–3 | 1–0 | 2–2 | 0–0 | 1–3 | 1–3 | 0–2 |
| Al Jazira | 4–0 | 1–3 | 2–0 | | 3–1 | 2–0 | 0–0 | 0–5 | 0–1 | 1–0 | 1–2 | 4–2 | 1–2 | 1–1 |
| Al Nasr | 3–1 | 0–2 | 0–1 | 2–3 | | 2–1 | 0–0 | 0–1 | 4–1 | 3–2 | 3–2 | 3–1 | 1–1 | 2–1 |
| Al Urooba | 0–2 | 2–4 | 1–3 | 4–5 | 1–5 | | 1–1 | 1–2 | 1–0 | 1–2 | 2–1 | 1–2 | 1–4 | 0–1 |
| Al Wahda | 1–0 | 2–1 | 0–2 | 2–2 | 2–2 | 3–0 | | 2–2 | 2–2 | 4–2 | 3–1 | 3–1 | 2–2 | 3–0 |
| Al Wasl | 2–0 | 1–0 | 3–1 | 2–2 | 3–1 | 6–0 | 2–2 | | 3–1 | 1–0 | 2–2 | 3–4 | 2–1 | 0–1 |
| Baniyas | 3–1 | 0–3 | 1–1 | 2–0 | 0–0 | 0–1 | 0–3 | 0–0 | | 2–4 | 2–2 | 3–3 | 1–5 | 1–4 |
| Dibba Al Hisn | 0–1 | 3–2 | 1–2 | 1–6 | 0–1 | 1–2 | 0–2 | 2–3 | 1–0 | | 2–2 | 0–1 | 0–3 | 1–4 |
| Kalba | 3–2 | 3–3 | 3–0 | 1–1 | 2–3 | 3–0 | 0–1 | 2–2 | 0–1 | 2–1 | | 0–1 | 1–2 | 2–1 |
| Khor Fakkan | 0–2 | 2–2 | 1–1 | 1–0 | 3–3 | 3–0 | 0–1 | 2–1 | 5–2 | 1–1 | 0–2 | | 1–1 | 2–4 |
| Shabab Al Ahli | 3–1 | 0–0 | 2–1 | 2–1 | 2–0 | 2–0 | 5–4 | 3–0 | 2–0 | 3–2 | 0–0 | 4–0 | | 2–1 |
| Sharjah | 4–0 | 0–3 | 0–1 | 4–0 | 3–0 | 2–1 | 2–0 | 4–1 | 1–2 | 1–0 | 1–0 | 1–0 | 0–0 | |

Source: UPLeague
Legend: Blue = home team win; Yellow = draw; Red = away team win.
For upcoming matches, an "a" indicates there is an article about the rivalry between the two participants.

=== Positions by round ===
The table lists the positions of teams after each week of matches.

== Season statistics ==
=== Top scorers ===
| Rank | Player | Team | Goals |
|---|---|---|---|
| 1 | (Togo) Kodjo Fo-Doh Laba | Al Ain | 18 |
| 2 | (Syria) Omar Khribin | Al Wahda | 13 |
| 3 | (Iran) Mehdi Ghayedi | Ittihad Kalba | 12 |
| 4 | (Iran) Sardar Azmoun | Al Ahli Dubai | 11 |
| 5 | (United Arab Emirates) Caio Lucas | Al Sharjah | 8 |
| 5 | (United Arab Emirates) Ali Mabkhout | Al Nasr | 8 |
| 5 | (Morocco) Soufiane Rahimi | Al Ain | 8 |
| 5 | (Cameroon) Anatole Abang | Al Bataeh | 8 |
| 8 | (Jamaica) Junior Flemmings | Ajman | 7 |
| 8 | (Morocco) Adel Taarabt | Sharjah FC | 7 |

== Awards ==
=== Annual awards ===
| Award | Winner | Club |
|---|---|---|
| Golden Ball – Best Player | (Iran) Sardar Azmoun | Shabab Al Ahli |
| Golden Glove – Best Goalkeeper | (United Arab Emirates) Hamad Al-meqbaali | Shabab Al Ahli |
| The Leader – Best Coach | (Portugal) Paulo Sousa | Shabab Al Ahli |
| Golden Boy – Best U23 Player | (Brazil) Guilherme Bala | Shabab Al Ahli |
| Best Goal | (France) Nabil Fekir | Al Jazira |
| Fans' Player of the Year | (Egypt) Mohamed Elneny | Al Jazira |

Team of the Year
| Goalkeeper | (United Arab Emirates) Hamad Al-meqbaali (Shabab Al Ahli) | | | |
| Defence | (United Arab Emirates) Marcos Meloni (Sharjah) | | (Egypt) Mohamed Elneny (Al Jazira) | (United Arab Emirates) Lucas Pimenta (Al Wahda) |
| Midfield | (United Arab Emirates) Ali Saleh (Al Wasl) | | (Iran) Mehdi Ghayedi (Kalba) | (United Arab Emirates) Caio Lucas (Sharjah) |
| Attack | (United Arab Emirates) Fábio Lima (Al Wasl) | (Iran) Sardar Azmoun (Shabab Al Ahli) | (Togo) Laba Kodjo (Al Ain) | (Brazil) Guilherme Bala (Shabab Al Ahli) |
