= Abdoul Karim Traoré (footballer, born 2005) =

Malian footballer (born 2005)

Personal information
- Date of birth: January 11, 2005 (age 21)
- Place of birth: Bamako, Mali
- Position: Midfielder

Team information
- Current team: Al Ain
- Number: 70

Youth career
- CFC Daoula
- Derby Académie

Senior career*
Years	Team	Apps	(Gls)
2023–	Al Ain		

International career
2022	Mali U20		
- * Club domestic league appearances and goals

Abdoul Karim Traoré (born 11 January 2005) is a Malian professional footballer who plays as a midfielder for Al Ain in the UAE Pro League.

== Career ==
=== Early career ===
Traoré began his football development in Mali, playing for CFC Daoula before joining Derby Académie. He represented Mali at the under-20 level and participated in the WAFU-A U20 tournament held in Mauritania in 2022.

=== Al Ain ===
In September 2023, Traoré signed his first professional contract with Al Ain, initially through June 2025.

He established himself in Al Ain's first team and played in the UAE Pro League and other competitions. The club subsequently renewed his contract until 2030.

In May 2024, Traoré was part of the Al Ain squad that won the AFC Champions League, defeating Yokohama F. Marinos 6–3 on aggregate in the final.

During the 2025 FIFA Club World Cup, Traoré made three appearances for Al Ain.

In May 2026, Traoré scored the opening goal in Al Ain's 5–0 victory over Sharjah, a result that secured the 2025–26 UAE Pro League title with two matches remaining.

On 22 May 2026, he scored Al Ain's third goal in a 4–1 victory over Al Jazira in the final of the UAE President's Cup, helping the club complete a domestic double.

== Career statistics ==
=== Club ===
As of match played 10 October 2026

Club	Season	League			National cup (Note: Includes the UAE President's Cup.)		League cup (Note: Includes the UAE League Cup.)		Continental		Other (Note: Includes the FIFA Intercontinental Cup and FIFA Club World Cup.)		Total	
Club	Season	Division	Apps	Goals	Apps	Goals	Apps	Goals	Apps	Goals	Apps	Goals	Apps	Goals
Binga	2021–22	–			–		–		1 (Note: Appearance in the CAF Confederation Cup.)	0	–		1	0
Al Ain	2023–24	UAE Pro League	19	1	3	0	5	1	3 (Note: Appearances in the AFC Champions League.)	0	0	0	30	2
Al Ain	2024–25	UAE Pro League	23	1	1	0	4	0	6 (Note: Appearances in the AFC Champions League Elite.)	0	2 (Note: Appearances in the FIFA Intercontinental Cup.)	0	36	1
Al Ain	2025–26	UAE Pro League	25	3	2	1	7	0	0	0	3 (Note: Appearances in the FIFA Club World Cup.)	0	37	4
Al Ain	2026–27	UAE Pro League	5	2	0	0	3	0	1 (Note: Appearance in the AFC Champions League Elite.)	0	0	0	9	2
Al Ain	Total	UAE Pro League	72	7	6	1	19	1	10	0	5	0	112	9
Career total			72	7	6	1	19	1	11	0	5	0	113	9

== Honours ==
=== Al Ain ===
- AFC Champions League: 2023–24
- UAE Pro League: 2025–26
- UAE President's Cup: 2025–26

=== Individual ===
- UAE Pro League Golden Boy Award (Best U23 Player): 2025–26
- UAE Pro League Dream Team: 2025–26
