= 2025–26 UAE Pro League =

UAE Pro League
- Season: 2025–26
- Dates: 16 August 2025 – 16 May 2026
- Champions: Al Ain
- Champions League Elite: Al Ain; Shabab Al Ahli; Al Wasl; Al Jazira
- Champions League Two: Al Wahda
- Gulf Champions League: Al-Nasr
- Matches: 168
- Goals: 471 (2.8 per match)
- Top goalscorer: Kodjo Fo-Doh Laba (25 goals)
- Biggest home win: Shabab Al Ahli 7–0 Dibba
- Biggest away win: Sharjah 0–5 Al Ain
- Highest scoring: Shabab Al Ahli 7–0 Dibba; Al Jazira 4–3 Dibba
- Longest unbeaten run: 26 matches Al Ain
- Highest attendance: Al Ain vs. Sharjah (18,103)
- All statistics correct as of 16 May 2026.

The 2025–26 UAE Pro League (also known as ADNOC Pro League for sponsorship reasons) was the 51st edition of the UAE Pro League. Shabab Al Ahli were the defending champions, however they failed to defend their title, as Al Ain would go on to win their 15th league title.

== Personnel and kits ==
Note: Flags indicate national team as has been defined under FIFA eligibility rules. Players may hold more than one non-FIFA nationality.

Team	Head coach	Captain	Kit manufacturer	Shirt sponsor
Ajman	(Serbia) Goran Tufegdžić	(United Arab Emirates) Saoud Saeed	Adidas	Ajman Bank
Al Ain	(Serbia) Vladimir Ivić	(United Arab Emirates) Bandar Al-Ahbabi	Nike	First Abu Dhabi Bank
Al Bataeh	(Iran) Farhad Majidi	(United Arab Emirates) Mohamed Ahmed	Nike	Majid Al Futtaim Group
Al Dhafra	(Montenegro) Željko Petrović	(United Arab Emirates) Sultan Al-Ghaferi	Uhlsport	Emaar Properties
Al Jazira	(Bosnia and Herzegovina) Marino Pušić	(United Arab Emirates) Ali Khasif	Zat Outfit	Healthpoint
Al-Nasr	(Serbia) Slaviša Jokanović	(United Arab Emirates) Ahmed Shambih	Adidas	Emirates Islamic
Al Wahda	(Slovenia) Darko Milanič	(United Arab Emirates) Ismail Matar	Adidas	Volkswagen
Al Wasl	(Portugal) Rui Vitória	(United Arab Emirates) Ali Salmeen	Macron	Dubai Real Estate Centre
Baniyas	(Romania) Daniel Isăilă	(United Arab Emirates) Fawaz Awana	Macron	ADIB
Dibba	(United Arab Emirates) Abdullah Mesfer	(United Arab Emirates) Khalid Abdullah	Uhlsport	Emirates NBD
Kalba	(Iraq) Ghazi Fahad	(United Arab Emirates) Abdusalam Mohammed	Nike	Shurooq
Khor Fakkan	(Croatia) Damir Krznar	(United Arab Emirates) Masoud Sulaiman	Macron	ADNOC
Shabab Al Ahli	(Portugal) Paulo Sousa	(United Arab Emirates) Majed Naser	Nike	Mai Dubai
Sharjah	(Portugal) José Morais	(United Arab Emirates) Shahin Abdulrahman	Adidas	SAIF Zone

== Foreign players ==
All clubs can register foreigners as many as they want but can only include five professionals in each team rosters. Players under the age of 23 (U23) are not counted as professionals, and players who have received Emirati citizenship are deemed as local players.

- Players name in **bold** indicates the player is registered during the mid-season transfer window.
- Players in italics were out of the squad or left the club within the season, after the pre-season transfer window, or in the mid-season transfer window, and at least had one appearance.

Club	Player 1	Player 2	Player 3	Player 4	Player 5	Unregistered players	Former players
Ajman	(Brazil) Yuri Matias	(Jamaica) Junior Flemmings	(Morocco) Walid Azaro	(Morocco) **Yahya Jabrane**	(North Macedonia) Gjoko Zajkov		(Bosnia and Herzegovina) Dino Hotić
Al Ain	(Egypt) Ramy Rabia	(Morocco) Soufiane Rahimi	(Paraguay) Kaku	(Romania) **Adrian Șut**	(Togo) Kodjo Fo-Doh Laba	(South Korea) Park Yong-woo	
Al Bataeh	(Brazil) Daniel Bessa	(Cape Verde) Diney	(Ivory Coast) Ulrich Meleke	(Mali) **Nouha Dicko**	(Uzbekistan) Azizjon Ganiev		(Cameroon) Anatole Abang
Al Dhafra	(Brazil) Jobson	(Iraq) **Ibrahim Bayesh**	(Morocco) Karim El Berkaoui	(Morocco) Mohamed El Khaloui	(Morocco) Mohssine Rabja		(Iceland) Jóhann Berg Guðmundsson
Al Jazira	(Angola) **Felício Milson**	(Brazil) Willyan Rocha	(Democratic Republic of the Congo) Simon Banza	(Egypt) Mohamed Elneny	(France) Nabil Fekir		(Argentina) Ramón Miérez (Egypt) Ibrahim Adel
Al Nasr	(Argentina) Ramón Miérez	(Colombia) Kevin Agudelo	(Iran) Mehdi Ghayedi	(Norway) **Marius Høibråten**	(Serbia) Luka Milivojević	(Ghana) Bernard Mensah	(Italy) Manolo Gabbiadini
Al Wahda	(Belgium) **Christian Benteke**	(Iran) Mohammad Ghorbani	(Serbia) Dušan Tadić	(Syria) Omar Khribin			(Serbia) Darko Lazović
Al Wasl	(Brazil) Adryelson	(Colombia) **Miguel Borja**	(France) **Kurt Zouma**	(Morocco) Soufiane Bouftini	(Peru) Renato Tapia		(Brazil) Matheus Saldanha
Baniyas	(Mali) Youssoufou Niakaté	(Nigeria) Saviour Godwin	(Sierra Leone) Alhassan Koroma	(Uzbekistan) Otabek Shukurov			(Ivory Coast) Ismaël Olivier Touré (Uzbekistan) Akmal Mozgovoy
Dibba	(Brazil) **Andrigo**	(Brazil) Carlinhos	(Brazil) Iago Santos	(Iraq) Mohanad Ali	(Japan) Takashi Uchino	(Uzbekistan) Abdulla Abdullaev	(Jordan) Mahmoud Al-Mardi
Kalba	(Denmark) **Andreas Maxsø**	(Iran) Ahmad Nourollahi	(Iran) Saman Ghoddos	(Iran) Shahriyar Moghanlou	(Slovenia) Miha Blažič		(Iran) Mohammad Mehdi Mohebi
Khor Fakkan	(Brazil) **Filipe Augusto**	(Brazil) Lourency	(Morocco) Tarik Tissoudali	(Portugal) Aylton Boa Morte	(South Korea) Won Du-jae	(Morocco) Selim Amallah	(Cameroon) Pierre Kunde
Shabab Al Ahli	(Iran) Saeid Ezatolahi	(Iran) Sardar Azmoun	(Serbia) Bogdan Planić	(Serbia) Nemanja Maksimović			
Sharjah	(Argentina) Gerónimo Poblete	(Brazil) Igor Coronado	(Brazil) **Matheus Saldanha**	(South Korea) Cho Yu-min	(Tunisia) Firas Ben Larbi	(Morocco) Adel Taarabt	(Albania) Rey Manaj

== League table ==
Pos	Team	Pld	W	D	L	GF	GA	GD	Pts	Qualification or relegation
1	Al Ain (C)	26	21	5	0	62	18	+44	68	Qualification for AFC Champions League Elite league stage
2	Shabab Al Ahli	26	17	7	2	60	18	+42	58	Qualification for AFC Champions League Elite league stage
3	Al Wasl	26	14	6	6	39	29	+10	48	Qualification for AFC Champions League Elite league stage
4	Al Jazira	26	13	5	8	46	30	+16	44	Qualification for AFC Champions League Elite preliminary stage
5	Al Wahda	26	10	10	6	38	26	+12	40	Qualification for AFC Champions League Two group stage
6	Al Nasr	26	9	11	6	36	34	+2	38	Qualification for AGCFF GCCL group stage
7	Ajman	26	9	5	12	27	34	−7	32	Qualification for AGCFF GCCL group stage
8	Sharjah	26	8	5	13	35	47	−12	29	
9	Khor Fakkan	26	6	9	11	35	45	−10	27 (Note: Head-to-head points: Khor Fakkan 7, Baniyas 4.)	
10	Baniyas	26	7	6	13	29	43	−14	27	
11	Kalba	26	5	9	12	29	45	−16	24	
12	Al Dhafra	26	6	4	16	28	52	−24	22	
13	Al Bataeh (R)	26	4	9	13	24	37	−13	21	Relegation to UAE Division 1
14	Dibba (R)	26	5	5	16	25	55	−30	20	Relegation to UAE Division 1

Source: UAE Pro League
Rules for classification: 1) Points; 2) Head-to-head points; 3) Head-to-head goal difference; 4) Head-to-head goals scored; 5) Goal difference; 6) Number of goals scored; 7) Disciplinary points; 8) Drawing of lots
(C) Champions; (R) Relegated

== Results ==
Home \ Away	AJM	AIN	BTH	JAZ	NAS	DHF	WAH	WAS	YAS	DAF	KAL	KHF	SAD	SHR
Ajman		0–3	1–0	1–1	2–2	1–1	0–2	1–3	1–1	2–0	0–1	1–2	0–1	3–2
Al Ain	2–0		2–1	1–1	1–1	5–0	2–2	2–0	4–0	5–0	2–0	3–0	3–2	1–0
Al Bataeh	1–0	0–2		1–1	2–3	1–1	1–3	0–1	0–1	0–1	2–2	2–1	0–4	0–0
Al Jazira	3–0	0–1	1–0		0–0	4–2	0–1	1–2	4–1	4–2	2–1	3–1	0–3	5–0
Al Nasr	1–0	2–2	1–1	3–2		2–0	2–2	1–1	0–2	1–1	2–1	2–2	0–1	2–4
Al Dhafra	0–1	1–2	3–1	1–2	0–1		1–0	3–1	0–2	2–1	3–0	2–3	0–5	0–2
Al Wahda	2–0	0–1	2–2	1–2	3–2	5–2		2–3	3–0	1–0	2–2	1–0	0–0	1–1
Al Wasl	0–0	1–1	1–0	1–0	2–1	3–0	1–0		2–0	4–2	2–1	0–1	1–1	2–1
Baniyas	0–1	2–3	1–1	0–4	1–2	2–2	1–0	2–0		2–2	0–1	0–3	2–2	1–1
Dibba	0–2	2–3	2–1	0–1	1–1	1–0	1–1	1–3	2–1		1–2	1–0	0–4	1–3
Kalba	1–3	1–3	1–3	1–1	0–1	1–1	0–0	2–2	1–2	2–1		0–0	0–0	2–2
Khor Fakkan	2–5	2–3	1–1	3–2	0–0	2–3	1–1	1–1	2–1	0–0	2–4		0–1	2–2
Shabab Al Ahli	3–1	0–1	1–1	2–1	2–1	2–0	1–1	3–1	1–0	7–0	5–1	3–3		2–0
Sharjah	0–1	0–5	0–2	0–1	1–2	2–0	0–2	2–1	1–4	4–1	3–1	3–1	1–4	

Source: UPLeague
Legend: Blue = home team win; Yellow = draw; Red = away team win.
For upcoming matches, an "a" indicates there is an article about the rivalry between the two participants.

== Top scorers ==
As of matches played 6 May 2026

Rank	Player	Team	Goals
1	(Togo) Kodjo Fo-Doh Laba	Al Ain	22
2	(Syria) Omar Khribin	Al Wahda	17
3	(Brazil) Yuri César	Shabab Al Ahli	13
4	(Morocco) Karim El Berkaoui	Al Dhafra	10
4	(Morocco) Tarik Tissoudali	Khor Fakkan	10
4	(Morocco) Walid Azaro	Ajman	10
7	(France) Nabil Fekir	Al Jazira	9
8	(Iran) Shahriyar Moghanlou	Kalba	8
8	(Mali) Youssoufou Niakaté	Baniyas	8

== Awards ==
=== Annual awards ===
UAE Pro League Season Awards
Award	Winner	Club
Golden Ball Award	(Argentina) Matías Palacios	Al Ain FC
Golden Glove Award	(United Arab Emirates) Khalid Eisa	Al Ain FC
Leader Award	(Serbia) Vladimir Ivić	Al Ain FC
Golden Boy Award	(Mali) Abdoul Karim Traoré	Al Ain FC
Fans' Player of the Year	(Morocco) Soufiane Rahimi	Al Ain FC
Best Goal Award	(Brazil) Serginho	Al Wasl FC
Golden Shoe Award	(Togo) Kodjo Fo-Doh Laba	Al Ain FC

Team of the Year
Goalkeeper	(United Arab Emirates) Khalid Eisa (Al Ain)			
Defence	(Egypt) Ramy Rabia (Al Ain)	(Brazil) Kauan Santos (Shabab Al Ahli)	(Brazil) Renan (Shabab Al Ahli)	(United Arab Emirates) Nicolás Giménez (Al Wasl)
Midfield	(Argentina) Matías Palacios (Al Ain)	(Mali) Abdoul Karim Traoré (Al Ain)	(Paraguay) Kaku (Al Ain)	(Morocco) Soufiane Rahimi (Al Ain)
Forwards	(Togo) Kodjo Fo-Doh Laba (Al Ain)		(Brazil) Yuri César (Shabab Al Ahli)	
