= Kodjo Fo-Doh Laba =

Togolese footballer (born 1992)

Personal information
- Date of birth: 27 January 1992 (age 34)
- Place of birth: Lomé, Togo
- Height: 1.83 m (6 ft 0 in)
- Position: Forward

Senior career*
Years	Team	Apps	(Gls)
2013–2014	Anges		
2015–2016	US Bitam	49	(21)
2016–2019	RS Berkane	63	(29)
2019–2026	Al Ain	141	(131)

International career^{‡}
2016–	Togo	58	(21)
- * Club domestic league appearances and goals as of 12 January 2026 ‡ National team caps and goals as of 5 August 2026 (UTC)

Kodjo Fo-Doh Laba (born 27 January 1992) is a Togolese professional footballer who plays as a forward for the Togo national team.

== Club career ==
Born in Lomé, Laba has played for Anges FC, US Bitam and RS Berkane. He signed for Al Ain in June 2019. On 25 October 2019, Laba scored four goals in a 7–1 league win against Fujairah. On 21 February 2020, Laba again scored four times in a game; this coming in a 6–5 victory over Al Wasl in the quarter-finals of the UAE President's Cup.

== International career ==
He made his international debut in 2016, and was named in the squad for the 2017 Africa Cup of Nations.

== Career statistics ==
=== Club ===
As of match played 12 January 2026

Club	Season	League			National cup (Note: Includes Moroccan Throne Cup, UAE President's Cup)		League cup (Note: Includes UAE League Cup)		Continental		Other		Total	
Club	Season	Division	Apps	Goals	Apps	Goals	Apps	Goals	Apps	Goals	Apps	Goals	Apps	Goals
US Bitam	2014–15	Championnat National D1	29	7	0	0	–		–		–		20	7
US Bitam	2015–16	Championnat National D1	20	14	0	0	–		–		–		29	14
US Bitam	Total		49	21	0	0	–		–		–		49	21
RS Berkane	2016–17	Botola	20	4	2	0	–		–		–		22	4
RS Berkane	2017–18	Botola	21	6	7	1	–		14 (Note: Appearances in CAF Confederation Cup)	4	–		42	11
RS Berkane	2018–19	Botola	22	19	0	0	–		14	8	–		36	27
RS Berkane	Total		63	29	9	1	–		28	12	–		100	42
Al Ain	2019–20	UAE Pro League	18	19	1	4	5	3	0	0	–		24	26
Al Ain	2020–21	UAE Pro League	23	13	1	0	0	0	7 (Note: Appearances in AFC Champions League)	2	–		31	15
Al Ain	2021–22	UAE Pro League	22	26	2	1	5	4	1	0	–		30	31
Al Ain	2022–23	UAE Pro League	26	28	7	3	2	0	0	0	1 (Note: Appearance in UAE Super Cup)	0	36	31
Al Ain	2023–24	UAE Pro League	19	12	1	0	4	0	7	8	0	0	31	20
Al Ain	2024–25	UAE Pro League	21	20	2	1	3	1	5 (Note: Appearances in AFC Champions League Elite)	0	4	1	35	23
Al Ain	2025–26	UAE Pro League	12	13	1	2	5	3	0	0	0	0	18	18
Al Ain	Total		141	131	15	11	24	11	20	10	5	1	205	164
Career total			251	191	24	12	26	11	48	22	7	1	354	227

=== International ===
As of match played 13 November 2024

Appearances and goals by national team and year
National team	Year	Apps	Goals
Togo	2016	6	4
Togo	2017	12	6
Togo	2018	6	1
Togo	2019	7	1
Togo	2020	2	0
Togo	2021	5	2
Togo	2022	6	4
Togo	2023	4	1
Togo	2024	5	1
Total		53	20

Scores and results list Togo's goal tally first.

No.	Date	Venue	Opponent	Score	Result	Competition
1.	5 June 2016	Antoinette Tubman Stadium, Monrovia, Liberia	Liberia	2–2	2–2	2017 Africa Cup of Nations qualification
2.	4 September 2016	Stade de Kégué, Lomé, Togo	Djibouti	3–0	5–0	2017 Africa Cup of Nations qualification
3.	9 October 2016	Stade de Kégué, Lomé, Togo	Mozambique	1–0	2–0	Friendly
4.	9 October 2016	Stade de Kégué, Lomé, Togo	Mozambique	2–0	2–0	Friendly
5.	24 January 2017	Stade de Port-Gentil, Port-Gentil, Gabon	DR Congo	1–2	1–3	2017 Africa Cup of Nations
6.	4 June 2017	Stade Paul Le Cesne, Marseille, France	Comoros	1–0	2–0	Friendly
7.	12 November 2017	Stade de Kégué, Lomé, Togo	Mauritius	2–0	6–0	Friendly
8.	12 November 2017	Stade de Kégué, Lomé, Togo	Mauritius	3–0	6–0	Friendly
9.	12 November 2017	Stade de Kégué, Lomé, Togo	Mauritius	5–0	6–0	Friendly
10.	12 November 2017	Stade de Kégué, Lomé, Togo	Mauritius	6–0	6–0	Friendly
11.	18 November 2018	Stade Municipal, Lomé, Togo	Algeria	1–3	1–4	2019 Africa Cup of Nations qualification
12.	6 September 2019	Stade de Moroni, Moroni, Comoros	Comoros	1–0	1–1	2022 FIFA World Cup qualification
13.	5 June 2021	Arslan Zeki Demirci Spor Kompleksi, Manavgat, Turkey	Guinea	1–0	2–0	Friendly
14.	5 June 2021	Arslan Zeki Demirci Spor Kompleksi, Manavgat, Turkey	Guinea	2–0	2–0	Friendly
15.	24 March 2022	Mardan Sports Complex, Aksu, Turkey	Sierra Leone	3–0	3–0	Friendly
16.	29 March 2022	Mardan Sports Complex, Aksu, Turkey	Benin	1–0	1–1	Friendly
17.	3 Juin 2022	Stade de Kégué, Lomé, Togo	Eswatini	1–0	2–2	2023 Africa Cup of Nations qualification
18.	27 September 2022	Stade Larbi Zaouli, Casablanca, Morocco	Equatorial Guinea	2–0	2–2	Friendly
19.	28 March 2023	Stade de Kégué, Lomé, Togo	Burkina Faso	1–1	1–1	2023 Africa Cup of Nations qualification
20.	9 September 2024	Estadio de Malabo, Malabo, Equatorial Guinea	Equatorial Guinea	2–2	2–2	2025 Africa Cup of Nations qualification
21.	9 June 2026	El Bachir Stadium, Mohammedia, Morocco	Benin	5–1	5–1	Friendly

== Honours ==
RS Berkane

- Moroccan Throne Cup: 2018

Al Ain

- AFC Champions League: 2023–24
- UAE Pro League: 2021–22, 2025–26
- UAE President's Cup: 2025–26
- UAE League Cup: 2021–22

Individual

- Botola Top Scorer: 2018–19
- UAE Pro League Top Scorer: 2019–20, 2021–22, 2024–25,
- UAE Pro League Player of the Month: March 2021, August 2021
