= Binga =

Binga may refer to:

- Binga District, Zimbabwe
- Binga village, Zimbabwe
- Binga, Mali
- Binga, Democratic Republic of the Congo
- Binga people, an ethnic group in Sudan
- Jesse Binga, American businessman
- Monte Binga, highest mountain in Mozambique
- Brett Lee (born 1976), Australian cricketer, nicknamed Binga
