= Jonatas Santos =

Emirati footballer (born 2001)

Personal information
- Full name: Jonatas da Anunciação Santos
- Date of birth: 16 December 2001 (age 24)
- Place of birth: Feira de Santana, Brazil
- Height: 1.76 m (5 ft 9 in)
- Positions: Winger; forward

Team information
- Current team: Al-Nasr (on loan from Al Ain)
- Number: 9

Youth career
- 2014–2019: Fluminense
- 2019–2022: Al Ain U21

Senior career*
Years	Team	Apps	(Gls)
2019–	Al Ain	50	(5)
2019–2020	→ Hatta (loan)	1	(0)
2024–2025	→ Al Wasl (loan)	19	(3)
2025–2025	→ Al-Nasr (loan)	2	(0)

International career^{‡}
2025–	United Arab Emirates	2	(0)
- * Club domestic league appearances and goals ‡ National team caps and goals as of 25 March 2025

Jonatas da Anunciação Santos (born 16 December 2001), also known as Jonatas, is a professional footballer who plays as winger for Al-Nasr, on loan from Al Ain in UAE Pro League. Born in Brazil, he represents the United Arab Emirates at international level.

== Club career ==
He moved to Al Ain in 2019 then loaned to Hatta. His official debut with the first-team was against Ajman on 21 March 2021 in League. He scored his first senior goal on 6 December 2021 against Ittihad Jeddah in a friendly match.

== Career statistics ==
As of match played 10 December 2023

Appearances and goals by club, season and competition
Club	Season	League			President's Cup		League Cup		Continental		Total	
Club	Season	Division	Apps	Goals	Apps	Goals	Apps	Goals	Apps	Goals	Apps	Goals
Hatta	2019–20	UPL	1	0	—		—		—		1	0
Al Ain	2020–21	UPL	5	0	0	0	0	0	0	0	5	0
Al Ain	2021–22	UPL	15	0	2	0	6	1	0	0	23	1
Al Ain	2022–23	UPL	20	3	6	0	3	0	—		29	3
Al Ain	2023–24	UPL	6	2	0	0	1	0	1	0	8	2
Al Ain	Total		46	5	8	0	10	1	1	0	65	6
Career total			47	5	8	0	10	1	1	0	66	6

== Honours ==
Al Ain

- AFC Champions League: 2023-24
