= Mai Dubai =

Dubai-based bottled water company

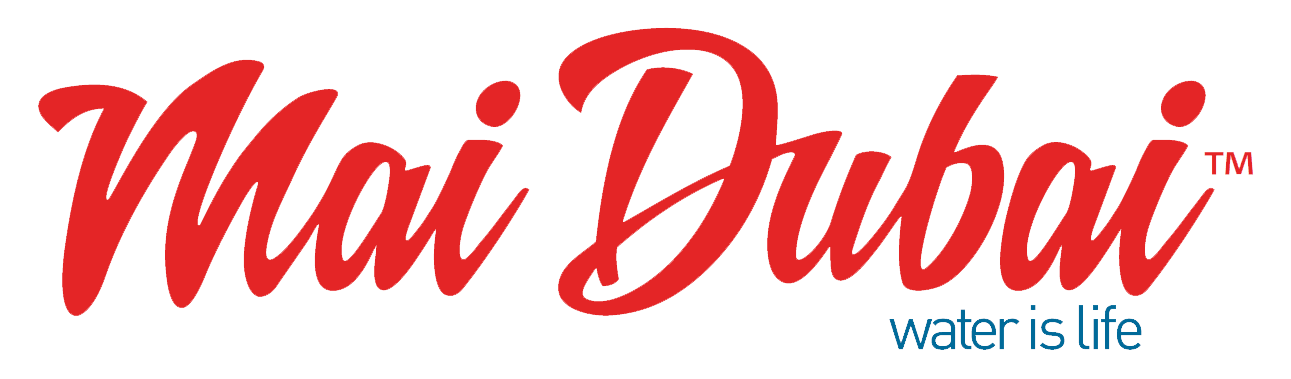
- Type: Limited Liability Company
- Industry: Food & Beverage
- Founded: December 2012; 13 years ago in Dubai, UAE
- Founder: Dubai Electricity and Water Authority
- Headquarters: D63, Al Qudra Road, Yalayas, Dubai
- Key people: Abraham Kah (CEO); Saeed Mohammed Al Tayer (Chairman)
- Products: Bottled Water
- Revenue: 275 million
- Website: www.maidubaiwater.com

Mai Dubai is a Dubai-based company that produces bottled water. It is owned by the state-run Dubai Electricity and Water Authority (DEWA) and serves as one of DEWA's key investments towards diversifying their revenue streams. DEWA owns 99% of the shares in Mai Dubai, however it remains an independently operated Limited Liability Company.

Mai Dubai was launched in 2012. The US magazine Beverage World in its July 2016 issue, for its 7th Annual BevStar Awards, gave Mai Dubai a bronze award in its water category. In May 2016 Gulf News reported Mai Dubai as being the preferred bottled water for all Emirates passengers.

== History ==
Mai Dubai was founded on 19 December 2012 by DEWA to build and manage a new bottled water plant in Dubai. The company started constructing its production facility in June 2013 and commercial production began in March 2014. Since then it has continued to quickly grow garner market share in the region.

On May 27, 2016, His Highness Sheikh Mohamed Bin Rashid Al Maktoum, Vice President and Prime Minister of the UAE, Ruler of Dubai, visited the Mai Dubai company and factory accompanied by the Chairman of Mai Dubai His Excellency Saeed M. Al Tayer, the CEO of Mai Dubai Jay Andres and in the presence of members of the Media. His Highness took a tour of the premises, visiting employee offices, followed by a full tour of the Plant.

On February 23, 2015, Sheikh Hamdan bin Rashid Al Maktoum, UAE Minister of Finance, officially inaugurated Mai Dubai bottled drinking-water company and factory in Yalayis on Al Qudra road in Dubai. As of February 2015, Mai Dubai produced 207 million units a year. Saeed Mohammed Al Tayer, Chairman of Mai Dubai was reported by Khaleej Times in January 2016 as saying that since starting distribution in April 2014, Mai Dubai has sold 163 million single servings of water.

== Etymology ==
The word Mai which means water in Arabic was used as it sounds similar to the English word my. Mai is also the phonetic sound of the word water in Arabic, hence the intended meaning of "Water from Dubai" but with the musical resonance which rhymes with the word Dubai, especially the sound made by the letters "a" and "I".

== Products ==
Mai Dubai's early success is related to the decision made to compete in the local premium water category. The result was a unique bottle design, with a red color logo, when most brands have similar bottle designs and focus on the color blue.

Mai Dubai water is available in small- and medium-size bottles of 1.5 Litre, 500ml and 330ml capacity as well as in five-gallon bottles mainly made for Home & Office Delivery, and finally 200 ml and 100ml size cups. The company sells bottled water both through various retailers and also offers direct delivery to consumers. As of April 2015 Mai Dubai is available across the UAE as well Qatar, Bahrain, Oman, and 13 countries in Asia, Europe, South Africa.

== Recognition ==
The US magazine Beverage World in its July 2016 issue, for its 7th Annual BevStar Awards, gave Mai Dubai a bronze award in its water category. The judging criteria to choose the award winners are: product taste, ingredients, packaging, market positioning and uniqueness. In May 2016 Gulf News reported Mai Dubai as being the preferred bottled water for all Emirates passengers.

Mai Dubai is the only bottled water company to be awarded by the Dubai Municipality, the highest grade in 2015 in food safety (Grade A). The company was also nominated for the Best Factory award by Dubai Municipality in 2015. Mai Dubai was also recognized on May 17, 2016 with "Best Marketing Impact" award by the "Middle East Beverage Awards" for its outstanding contribution to the Beverage Industry in the Middle East.
