= Saoud Saeed =

Emirati association football player (born 1990)

Saoud Saeed سُعُود سَعِيد
Personal information
- Full name: Saoud Saeed Suhail Ali Mohammed Zahmi
- Date of birth: 28 June 1990 (age 36)
- Place of birth: Emirates
- Height: 1.75 m (5 ft 9 in)
- Position: Left-back

Team information
- Current team: Al Orooba
- Number: 28

Youth career
- Al Orooba

Senior career*
Years	Team	Apps	(Gls)
2007–2008	Al Orooba		
2008–2013	Al-Wasl		
2013–2015	Al-Nasr		
2016–2020	Ajman		
2020–2021	Al Orooba		
2021–2025	Ajman		
2025–	Al Orooba		
- * Club domestic league appearances and goals

Saoud Saeed Suhail Ali Mohamed Zahmi (Arabic: سُعُود سَعِيد سُهَيْل عَلِيّ مُحَمَّد زَحْمِيّ; born 28 June 1990) is an Emirati footballer who plays for Al Orooba as a left back.

== Career ==
=== Al Urooba ===
Saoud Saeed started his career at Al Urooba and is a product of the Al-Urooba's youth system.

=== Al-Wasl ===
On 4 June 2008 left Al Urooba and signed with Al-Wasl.

=== Al-Nasr ===
On 24 June 2013 left Al-Wasl and signed with Al-Nasr.

=== Ajman ===
On 1 August 2016 left Al-Nasr and signed with Ajman.

=== Al Urooba ===
On 8 August 2020 left Ajman and signed with Al Urooba.
