= Kaku (footballer) =

Paraguayan footballer (born 1995)

- Kaku with Paraguay in 2026

Personal information
- Full name: Alejandro Sebastián Romero Gamarra
- Date of birth: 11 January 1995 (age 31)
- Place of birth: Ciudadela, Argentina
- Height: 1.71 m (5 ft 7 in)
- Positions: Attacking midfielder; winger

Team information
- Current team: Al Ain
- Number: 10

Youth career
- Huracán

Senior career*
Years	Team	Apps	(Gls)
2013–2017	Huracán	94	(9)
2018–2020	New York Red Bulls	72	(13)
2021–2023	Al Taawoun	52	(16)
2023–	Al Ain	66	(15)

International career^{‡}
2015	Argentina U20	5	(0)
2018–	Paraguay	36	(6)
- * Club domestic league appearances and goals as of 16 May 2026 ‡ National team caps and goals as of 12 June 2026

Alejandro Sebastián Romero Gamarra (born 11 January 1995), nicknamed Kaku, is a professional footballer who plays as an attacking midfielder or winger for UAE Pro League club Al Ain. Born in Argentina, he represents the Paraguay national team.

== Club career ==
=== Huracán ===
Born in Ciudadela, Kaku began his career in the youth ranks of Huracán. In 2013, Kaku made his professional debut for Huracán in the Primera B Nacional. He scored his first goal for the club on 12 October 2013 in a 4–1 victory over Aldosivi. On 14 December 2014, Kaku helped Huracán return to the top flight after three seasons in the Primera B Nacional, scoring the decisive second goal in a 4–1 victory over Atlético Tucumán. With the promotion to the top flight, Huracán concluded a very successful season, having won the 2013–14 Copa Argentina a few weeks prior in a penalty shoot-out over Rosario Central with Kaku appearing as a second-half substitute. This was the club's first official title in 41 years.

On 3 February 2015, he scored his first goal in the Copa Libertadores against Peruvian club Alianza Lima in a 4–0 victory. On 1 March 2016, Kaku led Huracán to a historic victory in the Copa Libertadores over Peñarol at the Estadio Centenario, scoring the lone goal in the 1–0 triumph. A few weeks later, on 24 March Kaku scored his first goal in the Argentine Primera División in a 2–0 victory over Aldosivi. On 18 July 2016 he helped Huracán advance in the Copa Argentina scoring the opening goal in a 2–1 victory over Central Córdoba.

On 27 May 2017, he scored an injury time equalizer from the penalty spot in a 1–1 draw with Boca Juniors. On 1 June 2017, Kaku scored another important goal for his club, this time an injury time goal in a 4–0 victory over Deportivo Anzoátegui in the 2017 Copa Sudamericana. The goal helped Huracán advance to the next round by a 4–3 aggregate score after having lost the first leg by three goals. On 16 June 2017, he scored the lone goal in a 1–0 victory over Unión de Santa Fe, helping his club to a crucial three points which helped Huracán avoid relegation. On 28 October 2017, Kaku scored his club's second goal in a 4–0 victory over Lanús and celebrated the goal dedicating it to his recently deceased mother.

=== New York Red Bulls ===
On 23 December 2017, it was announced by Huracán that they had agreed a deal to transfer Kaku to New York Red Bulls of Major League Soccer for a fee of $6.25 million. After resolving various issues that held up the transfer, on 16 February 2018, it was announced that he had signed with New York. Red Bulls also sent $50,000 of General Allocation Money to Atlanta United, who owned his discovery rights. On 1 March 2018, Kaku made his debut for New York in a 2–0 victory over Olimpia in the CONCACAF Champions League. On 10 March 2018, he assisted Ben Mines on the opening goal of the match on his Red Bulls league debut in a 4–0 victory over Portland Timbers. On 13 March 2018, Kaku scored his first goal for New York in a 3–1 victory over Club Tijuana in the CONCACAF Champions League, helping the club advance to semifinals of the Champions League for the first time. On 14 April 2018, Kaku scored his first league goal for New York in a 3–1 victory over the Montreal Impact. On 28 April 2018, Kaku helped New York to a 3–2 victory over LA Galaxy, assisting on two goals and scoring the game winner with an 84th-minute penalty-kick goal. The following week, 5 May 2018, Kaku opened the scoring for New York in a 4–0 derby victory over New York City, he also assisted on two other goals. On 6 December 2018, Kaku was named the New York Red Bulls Newcomer of the Year for 2018 after leading the team in assists throughout the season.

=== Al-Taawoun ===
On 1 February 2021, it was announced by Al-Taawoun of the Saudi Professional League that they had agreed to a transfer for Kaku. On 17 February 2021, Romero Gamarra's former club New York Red Bulls and Major League Soccer sought arbitration against Kaku and the MLS Players Association for breach of contract. In April 2021 arbiter Shyam Das ruled against the MLSPA and Kaku and found that New York Red Bulls and Major League Soccer had exercised their unilateral contract option on Kaku prior to 31 December 2020. On 12 May 2021, Major League Soccer and New York Red Bulls filed a petition in United States federal court seeking to have the arbitration decision enforced. On 22 July 2021, MLS and New York Red Bulls filed suit in United States federal court against Kaku's agent Scott Pearson and Pearson's company Argentine Futbol Tours LLC, alleging "tortious interference" in Kaku's move to Al-Taawoun and seeking in excess of $6 million in damages. On 16 September 2021, MLS and New York Red Bulls voluntarily dismissed their suit against Pearson.

== International career ==
Kaku was born in Argentina to Paraguayan parents. He was selected by Argentina's U-20 manager, Humberto Grondona to participate in the 2015 FIFA U-20 World Cup in New Zealand. On 16 May 2018, Kaku announced his desire to file a one-time switch request with FIFA to play for Paraguay. The move was approved by FIFA on 23 May 2018, and he was immediately called up to the Paraguay national team for a friendly against Japan. He made his competitive debut for Paraguay on 12 June, as a substitute in the second half of the friendly match against Japan.

On 1 June 2026, he was named by head coach Gustavo Alfaro in Paraguay's 26-man squad for the 2026 FIFA World Cup.

== Personal life ==
Kaku is the older brother of the football 7 and futsal player Facundo "Facu" Romero Gamarra, who has played in the Kings League.

== Career statistics ==
=== Club ===
As of match played 16 May 2026

Appearances and goals by club, season and competition
Club	Season	League			National cup (Note: Includes Copa Argentina, U.S. Open Cup, King Cup, UAE President's Cup)		League cup (Note: Includes UAE League Cup)		Continental		Other		Total	
Club	Season	Division	Apps	Goals	Apps	Goals	Apps	Goals	Apps	Goals	Apps	Goals	Apps	Goals
Huracán	2013–14	Primera B Nacional	16	2	3	0	—		—		—		19	2
Huracán	2014	Primera B Nacional	6	3	0	0	—		—		—		6	3
Huracán	2015	Argentine Primera División	17	0	0	0	—		11 (Note: Three appearances in Copa Sudamericana, eight appearances and one goal in Copa Libertadores)	1	—		28	1
Huracán	2016	Argentine Primera División	16	1	2	1	—		9 (Note: Appearances in Copa Libertadores)	2	—		27	4
Huracán	2016–17	Argentine Primera División	27	2	3	0	—		3 (Note: Appearances in Copa Sudamericana)	1	—		33	3
Huracán	2017–18	Argentine Primera División	12	1	0	0	—		0	0	—		12	1
Huracán	Total		94	9	8	1	0	0	23	4	0	0	125	14
New York Red Bulls	2018	MLS	30	6	1	0	—		3 (Note: Appearances in CONCACAF Champions League)	1	4 (Note: Appearance(s) in MLS Cup Playoffs)	0	38	7
New York Red Bulls	2019	MLS	26	5	1	0	—		4	0	1	0	32	5
New York Red Bulls	2020	MLS	16	2	—		—		—		1	0	17	2
New York Red Bulls	Total		72	13	2	0	0	0	7	1	6	0	87	14
Al-Taawoun	2020–21	Saudi Pro League	11	7	3	2	—		—		—		14	9
Al-Taawoun	2021–22	Saudi Pro League	15	3	1	1	—		—		—		16	4
Al-Taawoun	2022–23	Saudi Pro League	26	6	1	2	—		—		—		27	8
Al-Taawoun	Total		52	16	5	5	0	0	0	0	0	0	57	21
Al Ain	2023–24	UAE Pro League	20	5	2	0	3	1	11 (Note: Appearances in AFC Champions League)	4	—		36	10
Al Ain	2024–25	UAE Pro League	24	6	1	0	2	0	8	3	3 (Note: Appearances in FIFA Club World Cup)	1	40	10
Al Ain	2025–26	UAE Pro League	22	4	3	0	5	0	—		—		30	4
Al Ain	Total		66	15	6	0	10	1	18	7	3	1	106	23
Career total			284	54	21	6	10	1	48	12	9	1	375	74

=== International ===
As of 12 June 2026

Appearances and goals by national team and year
National team	Year	Apps	Goals
Paraguay	2018	2	0
Paraguay	2019	3	2
Paraguay	2020	1	1
Paraguay	2021	7	2
Paraguay	2023	5	0
Paraguay	2024	9	0
Paraguay	2025	7	0
Paraguay	2026	2	1
Total		36	6

Scores and results list Paraguay's goal tally first.

No.	Date	Venue	Opponent	Score	Result	Competition
1.	10 September 2019	Amman International Stadium, Amman, Jordan	Jordan	4–2	4–2	Friendly
2.	13 October 2019	Tehelné pole, Bratislava, Slovakia	Slovakia	1–1	1–1	Friendly
3.	17 November 2020	Estadio Defensores del Chaco, Asunción, Paraguay	Bolivia	2–2	2–2	2022 FIFA World Cup qualification
4.	14 June 2021	Estádio Olímpico Pedro Ludovico, Goiânia, Brazil	Bolivia	1–1	3–1	2021 Copa América
5.	9 September 2021	Estadio Defensores del Chaco, Asunción, Paraguay	Venezuela	2–0	2–1	2022 FIFA World Cup qualification
6.	5 June 2026	Estadio Defensores del Chaco, Asunción, Paraguay	Nicaragua	1–0	4–0	Friendly
Correct as of 5 June 2026

== Honours ==
Huracán

- Copa Argentina: 2013–14
- Supercopa Argentina: 2014

New York Red Bulls

- Supporters' Shield: 2018

Al Ain

- AFC Champions League: 2023–24

Individual

- Saudi Pro League top assist provider: 2022–23
- Saudi Pro League Player of the Month: December 2022
