= Solomon Sosu =

Emirati footballer (born 2005)

Personal information
- Full name: Solomon Sosu
- Date of birth: 5 March 2005 (age 21)
- Place of birth: Accra, Ghana
- Height: 1.75 m (5 ft 9 in)
- Positions: Midfielder; full-back

Team information
- Current team: Baniyas (on loan from Al Ain)
- Number: 4

Youth career
- 2019–2023: Al Ain

Senior career*
Years	Team	Apps	(Gls)
2023–	Al Ain	9	(0)
2025–	→ Al-Nasr (loan)	0	(0)
2026–	→ Baniyas (loan)	0	(0)

International career
2024–2025	United Arab Emirates U20	3	(0)
2025–	United Arab Emirates U23	6	(1)
- * Club domestic league appearances and goals

Solomon Sosu (Arabic: سولومون سوسو; born 5 March 2005) is a professional football player who plays as a midfielder or full-back for Baniyas, on loan from Al Ain. Born in Ghana, he represents United Arab Emirates at international level.

== Club career ==
Sosu started his career at the youth teams of Al Ain and made his debut with the senior team in the 2023–24 season. On 9 July 2025, Sosu joined side Al-Nasr on a one-year loan. On 5 February 2026, Sosu joined side Baniyas on a six-month loan.

== International career ==
In 2024, Sosu obtained an Emirati passport, and was called up to the United Arab Emirates to participate in 26th Arabian Gulf Cup.

== Honours ==
Al Ain

- AFC Champions League: 2023-24
