= Healthpoint =

Hospital in Abu Dhabi, UAE

Healthpoint Hospital

Geography
- Location: Zayed Sports City, Abu Dhabi, United Arab Emirates
- Coordinates: 24°25′08.4″N 54°27′10.8″E

Organisation
- Type: General
- Affiliated university: US Children's National Medical Center
- Network: Mubadala Healthcare Network

History
- Opened: 2013

Links
- Website: healthpoint.ae
- Lists: Hospitals in United Arab Emirates

Healthpoint is a hospital located in Abu Dhabi, UAE. It was founded in 2013, and specialises in three fields: Orthopedic and Sports Medicine, Bariatric & Metabolic Surgery and Dentistry. Healthpoint is a public hospital and part of Mubadala’s Healthcare Network.

== Location ==
Healthpoint is located in Zayed Sports City in Abu Dhabi, UAE.

== Affiliation ==
Healthpoint is a partner of US Children's National Medical Center and received the Gold Seal of Approval from the Joint Commission International (JCI). Healthpoint is also the official regional partner of Manchester City Football Club.

== Departments ==
- Anesthesia
- Bariatric & Metabolic Surgery
- Cardiology
- Dentistry
- Dermatology
- Diagnostic Imaging
- Digestive Diseases
- Ear, Nose and Throat
- Family Medicine
- General Practice
- General Surgery
- Gynecology
- Internal Medicine
- Non-invasive Cosmetics
- Orthopedics & Sports Medicine
- Pain Management
- Pediatrics
- Physiotherapy & Rehabilitation
- Plastic & Cosmetic Surgery
- Podiatry
- Respiratory & Sleep Medicine
- Rheumatology
- Spine Care
- Urology & Endourology
- Vascular Surgery
- Wound Care

== Leadership ==
As of 2024, Omar Al Naqbi is the Acting Executive Director of Healthpoint, with Dr. Mai Al Jaber acting as the medical director of the hospital.
