= Mohammed Abbas (Emirati footballer) =

Emirati footballer (born 2002)

Mohammed Abbas مُحمَّد عَبَّاس
Personal information
- Full name: Mohammed Abbas Ahmed Abdulla Hassan Al-Baloushi
- Date of birth: 30 September 2002 (age 24)
- Place of birth: Al Ain, United Arab Emirates
- Height: 1.74 m (5 ft 9 in)
- Position: Midfielder

Team information
- Current team: Al Ain
- Number: 8

Youth career
- 2009–: Al Ain

Senior career*
Years	Team	Apps	(Gls)
2021–	Al Ain	33	(2)

International career^{‡}
2022–	United Arab Emirates	9	(0)
- * Club domestic league appearances and goals as of 8 April 2026 ‡ National team caps and goals as of 30 December 2023

Mohammed Abbas Al-Baloushi (Arabic: مُحَمَّد عَبَّاس أَحْمَد عَبْد الله حَسَن الْبَلُوشِيّ; born 30 September 2002), is an Emirati professional footballer who plays as a midfielder for UAE Pro League side Al Ain.

== Club career ==
=== Al Ain ===
Abbas was promoted to the first-team from in 2021. His official debut with the first-team was against Al Wahda on 12 March 2021 in League. He scored his first senior goal on 21 March 2021 against Ajman.

On 11 May 2024, Abbas scored a goal in the first leg of 2024 AFC Champions League final against Yokohama F. Marinos.

== International career ==
In 2021, Abbas was called up for the first time to join the United Arab Emirates national team for the Iran and Iraq matches in 2022 FIFA World Cup qualification. He made his international debut on 29 March 2022, against South Korea in a 2022 FIFA World Cup qualification.

On 4 January 2024, Abbas was named in the UAE's squad for the 2023 AFC Asian Cup.

== Career statistics ==
=== Club ===
As of 25 May 2024.

Club	Season	League			President's Cup		Continental		Other		Total	
Club	Season	Division	Apps	Goals	Apps	Goals	Apps	Goals	Apps	Goals	Apps	Goals
Al Ain	2020–21	UAE Pro League	7	1	0	0	1	0	0	0	8	1
Al Ain	2021–22	UAE Pro League	16	0	5	0	—		0	0	21	0
Al Ain	2023–24	UAE Pro League	10	1	1	0	11 (Note: Appearances in AFC Champions League)	1	4	1	26	3
Career total			33	2	6	0	12	1	4	1	55	4

== Honours ==
Al Ain Al Ain

- UAE Pro League: 2021–22
- UAE League Cup: 2021–22
- AFC Champions League: 2023–24
