= Sultan Al-Shamsi =

Emirati footballer (born 1996)

Personal information
- Full name: Sultan Saeed Al-Shamsi
- Date of birth: 22 June 1996 (age 30)
- Place of birth: United Arab Emirates
- Height: 1.63 m (5 ft 4 in)
- Position: Left winger

Youth career
- Al Jazira

Senior career*
Years	Team	Apps	(Gls)
2014–2019	Al Jazira	22	(2)
2017–2018	→ Al Dhafra (loan)	10	(0)
2019–2021	Baniyas	40	(7)
2021–2024	Al Ain	13	(3)
2023	→ Al-Nasr (loan)	5	(0)
2024–2025	Khor Fakkan	6	(0)

International career^{‡}
2016–	United Arab Emirates	3	(1)
- * Club domestic league appearances and goals as of 30 December 2021 ‡ National team caps and goals as of 3 June 2016

Sultan Al-Shamsi (Arabic:سلطان الشامسي) (born 22 June 1996) is an Emirati footballer who plays as a left winger.

== International career ==
Al-Shamsi made his senior debut for United Arab Emirates on 3 June 2016, where he scored the equalising goal in a 1–3 defeat to Jordan.

=== International goal ===
As of match played 3 June 2016. United Arab Emirates score listed first, score column indicates score after each Al-Shamsi goal.

International goals by date, venue, cap, opponent, score, result and competition
No.	Date	Venue	Cap	Opponent	Score	Result	Competition
1	3 June 2016	Rajamangala Stadium, Bangkok, Thailand	1	Jordan	1–1	1–3	2016 King's Cup

== Honours ==
Al Ain

- AFC Champions League: 2023-24
