= Park Yong-woo (footballer) =

South Korean footballer (born 1993)

Personal information
- Full name: Park Yong-woo
- Date of birth: 10 September 1993 (age 33)
- Place of birth: Goyang, South Korea
- Height: 1.86 m (6 ft 1 in)
- Positions: Defensive midfielder; centre-back

Team information
- Current team: Ulsan HD
- Number: 38

Youth career
- 2009–2011: Chuncheon Mech Tech High School
- 2012–2014: Konkuk University

Senior career*
Years	Team	Apps	(Gls)
2015–2016	FC Seoul	45	(1)
2017–2023	Ulsan Hyundai	157	(6)
2020–2021	→ Gimcheon Sangmu (draft)	30	(1)
2023–2026	Al-Ain	46	(1)
2026–	Ulsan HD	1	(0)

International career^{‡}
2015–2016	South Korea U23	18	(2)
2023–	South Korea	24	(0)
- * Club domestic league appearances and goals as of 25 September 2025 ‡ National team caps and goals as of 9 September 2025

- Park Yong-woo
- Hangul: 박용우
- Hanja: 朴鎔宇
- RR: Bak Yongu
- MR: Pak Yongu

Park Yong-woo (Korean: 박용우; Born 10 September 1993) is a South Korean professional footballer who plays as a defensive midfielder or a centre-back for Ulsan HD and the South Korea national team.

== Style of play ==
As a defensive midfielder, he protects the front line of the defense, with his passing ability and technique, he provides advantage by blocking passes based on anticipation.

== International career ==
He was called up by Jürgen Klinsmann to represent South Korea in friendly matches against Peru and El Salvador in June 2023 in which Park made his debut as a substitute in the second half against Peru.

== Career statistics ==
As of match played on 25 September 2025

Appearances and goals by club, season and competition
Club	Season	League			National Cup (Note: Includes Korean FA Cup, UAE President's Cup)		League Cup (Note: Includes UAE League Cup)		Continental		Other		Total	
Club	Season	Division	Apps	Goals	Apps	Goals	Apps	Goals	Apps	Goals	Apps	Goals	Apps	Goals
FC Seoul	2015	K League 1	26	0	5	0	—		3 (Note: Appearances in AFC Champions League)	0	—		34	0
FC Seoul	2016	K League 1	19	1	1	0	—		6	1	—		26	2
FC Seoul	Total		45	1	6	0	0	0	9	1	—		60	2
Ulsan Hyundai	2017	K League 1	31	2	3	1	—		3	0	—		37	3
Ulsan Hyundai	2018	K League 1	31	3	6	0	—		3	1	—		40	4
Ulsan Hyundai	2019	K League 1	36	0	1	0	—		9	1	—		46	1
Ulsan Hyundai	2021	K League 1	9	0	1	0	—		7	0	—		17	0
Ulsan Hyundai	2022	K League 1	31	0	0	0	—		4	0	—		35	0
Ulsan Hyundai	2023	K League 1	19	1	1	0	—		—		—		20	1
Ulsan Hyundai	Total		157	6	12	1	0	0	26	2	—		195	9
Gimcheon Sangmu (draft)	2020	K League 1	25	1	0	0	—		—		—		25	1
Gimcheon Sangmu (draft)	2021	K League 2	5	0	0	0	—		—		—		5	0
Gimcheon Sangmu (draft)	Total		30	1	0	0	0	0	0	0	—		30	1
Al-Ain	2023–24	UAE Pro League	17	1	2	0	4	0	12	0	—		35	1
Al-Ain	2024–25	UAE Pro League	24	0	0	0	3	0	8 (Note: Appearances in AFC Champions League Elite)	0	5 (Note: Three appearances in FIFA Club World Cup, two appearances in FIFA Intercontinental Cup)	0	40	0
Al-Ain	2025–26	UAE Pro League	5	0	0	0	1	0	0	0	0	0	6	0
Al-Ain	Total		46	1	2	0	8	0	20	0	5	0	81	1
Ulsan HD	2026	K League 1	0	0	0	0	—		—		—		0	0
Career totals			278	9	20	1	8	0	55	3	5	0	366	13

== Honours ==
FC Seoul

- K League 1: 2016
- Korean FA Cup: 2015

Ulsan Hyundai

- K League 1: 2022, 2023
- Korean FA Cup: 2017

Gimcheon Sangmu

- K League 2: 2021

Al-Ain

- UAE Pro League: 2025–26
- AFC Champions League: 2023–24
