= Khalid Al-Hashemi =

Emirati footballer (born 1997)

Khalid Al-Hashemi خَالِد الْهَاشِمِيّ
Personal information
- Full name: Khalid Mohammed Ahmed Hussein Al-Attas Al-Hashemi
- Date of birth: 18 March 1997 (age 29)
- Place of birth: Abu Dhabi, United Arab Emirates
- Height: 1.80 m (5 ft 11 in)
- Position: Centre back

Team information
- Current team: Baniyas
- Number: 16

Youth career
- 2010–2016: Baniyas

Senior career*
| Years | Team | Apps | (Gls) |
| 2016–2023 | Baniyas | 86 | (1) |
| 2023–2025 | Al Ain | 29 | (0) |
| 2025– | Baniyas | 2 | (0) |

International career
| 2022–2024 | United Arab Emirates | 18 | (0) |
- * Club domestic league appearances and goals

Khalid Mohammed Al-Hashemi (Arabic: خَالِدُ مُحَمَّدُ أَحْمَدُ حُسَيْنُ الْعَطَّاسُ الْهَاشِمِيُّ; born 18 March 1997) is an Emirati footballer who currently plays as a centre back for Baniyas.

== Career ==
Al-Hashemi started his career at Baniyas and is a product of the Baniyas's youth system. On 14 January 2017, Al-Hashemi made his professional debut for Baniyas against Al-Ain in the Pro League.

Al-Hashemi was included in Al Ain FC's squad for the 2025 FIFA Club World Cup, alongside seven other Emirati players.

== International career ==
On 4 January 2024, Al-Hashemi was named in the UAE's squad for the 2023 AFC Asian Cup.

== Honours ==
Al Ain

- AFC Champions League: 2023-24
