= 2021–22 Al Ain FC season =

Al Ain
2021–22 season
- President: Mohammed Bin Zayed
- Manager: Serhiy Rebrov (from 6 June 2021)
- Stadium: Hazza Bin Zayed
- UAE Pro-League: 1st
- President's Cup: Quarter-finals
- League Cup: Winners
- AFC Champions League: Play-off round
- Top goalscorer: League: Kodjo Laba (26 goals); All: Kodjo Laba (31 goals)
- Biggest win: Al Jazira 1–5 Al Ain; Al Ain 5–0 Al Jazira
Home colours	Away colours	Third colours
- All statistics correct as of 22 May 2022.

The 2021–22 season was Al Ain Football Club's 54th in existence and the club's 47th consecutive season in the top-level football league in the UAE.

== Club ==
=== Technical staff ===
Position	Name
Head coach	(Ukraine) Serhiy Rebrov
Assistant coach	(Spain) Vicente Gómez (United Arab Emirates) Ahmed Abdullah
Assistant coach and analyst	(Spain) Alberto Bosch
Fitness coach	(Spain) Jesus Pinedo (Italy) Alessandro Sarrocco
Goalkeeping coach	(Romania) Radu Lefter (Romania) Dan Zdrinca
Physiotherapist	(Brazil) Felipe Perseu
U-21 team head coach	(Iraq) Ghazi Fahad
First and U21 team supervisor	(United Arab Emirates) Abdullah Al Shamsi

Last updated: 18 July 2021

=== Board of directors ===
Office	Name
President	(United Arab Emirates) Mohammed Bin Zayed Al Nahyan
Vice President	(United Arab Emirates) Hazza Bin Zayed Al Nahyan
Chairman of Board of Directors	(United Arab Emirates) Matar Al Darmaki
Vice Chairman of Board of Directors	(United Arab Emirates) Khaled Al Dhaheri
Board of Directors Member	(United Arab Emirates) Matar Al Dhaheri
Board of Directors Member	(United Arab Emirates) Salem Al Jneibi
Board of Directors Member	(United Arab Emirates) Majid Al Owais

Last updated: 22 June 2019
Source: Al Ain Club

== Players ==
=== First Team ===
No	Position	Nation	Player	Age	Since	Ends	Notes
1	GK	(United Arab Emirates)	Mohammed Abo Sandah	31	2014	2024	
3	DF	(United Arab Emirates)	Salem Abdullah	28	2018	2024	
4	DF	(United Arab Emirates)	Mohammed Shaker	29	2019	2024	
5	DF	(Colombia)	Danilo Arboleda	31	2022	2023	
6	MF	(United Arab Emirates)	Yahia Nader	28	2018	2021	Second nationality: Egypt
7	FW	(United Arab Emirates)	Caio Canedo	36	2019	2024	Second nationality: Brazil
8	FW	(United Arab Emirates)	Ali Eid	28	2017		
9	FW	(Togo)	Kodjo Laba	34	2019	2024	
10	MF	(Argentina)	Cristian Guanca	33	2021	2022	
11	MF	(United Arab Emirates)	Bandar Al-Ahbabi (captain)	36	2016	2024	
12	GK	(United Arab Emirates)	Sultan Al-Mantheri	31	2021	2024	
13	MF	(United Arab Emirates)	Ahmed Barman	32	2013	2024	
14	MF	(United Arab Emirates)	Rayan Yaslam	31	2014	2024	
15	DF	(Brazil)	Erik Jorgens	25	2020		
17	GK	(United Arab Emirates)	Khalid Eisa (3rd captain)	37	2013	2024	
18	MF	(United Arab Emirates)	Khalid Al-Balochi	27	2018		
20	DF	(Tunisia)	Yassine Meriah	30	2021	2023	
21	FW	(Morocco)	Soufiane Rahimi	31	2021	2026	
22	DF	(United Arab Emirates)	Saeed Ahmed	32	2021	2024	
23	DF	(United Arab Emirates)	Mohamed Ahmed (vice-captain)	37	2012	2024	
27	MF	(United Arab Emirates)	Sultan Al-Shamsi	30	2021	2024	
29	DF	(United Arab Emirates)	Omar Saeed	27	2022	2024	
30	MF	(United Arab Emirates)	Mohammed Khalfan	28	2016	2024	
31	GK	(United Arab Emirates)	Suhail Al-Shamsi	28	2021		
33	DF	(Ivory Coast)	Kouame Autonne	26	2021	2024	
34	DF	(Brazil)	Rafael Pereira	26	2020	2022	
44	DF	(United Arab Emirates)	Saeed Juma	28	2017	2024	

=== Unregistered players ===
No	Position	Player	Nation
20	DF	TUN	Yassine Meriah ^{(Injured)}
—	MF	KAZ	Bauyrzhan Islamkhan ^{(Doping ban)}

=== From Reserve U21 and Youth Academy ===
No	Position	Player	Nation
2	DF	UAE	Saoud Al-Mahri
24	MF	SRB	Andrija Radovanovic
25	MF	UAE	Ali Al-Balochi
35	MF	UAE	Khalid Alaa
39	FW	UAE	Hamad Al Kalbani
40	DF	UAE	Khaled Al Balouchi
42	MF	BRA	Jonathan Santos
50	DF	UAE	Manea Al Shamsi
57	DF	UAE	Khalifa Al Hosani
59	MF	UAE	Khaled Waleed
61	GK	UAE	Zayed Khaled
66	DF	UAE	Mansour Saeed
70	MF	UAE	Mohammed Abbas
72	FW	SDN	Mohamed Awadalla
74	DF	EGY	Adham Khalid
75	MF	UAE	Zayed Alharthi
78	MF	OMA	Hamid Yahya
88	MF	UAE	Naser Al-Shikali
89	MF	UAE	Ahmed Al Qatesh

=== New contracts ===
Date	Pos	No.	Player	Ref.	Notes
3 July 2021	FW	9	(Togo) Kodjo Laba		2024
8 July 2021	MF	30	(United Arab Emirates) Mohammed Khalfan		2024
8 July 2021	DF	44	(United Arab Emirates) Saeed Juma		2024
21 September 2021	MF	70	(United Arab Emirates) Mohammed Abbas		2025
21 January 2022	MF	42	(Brazil) Jonathan Santos		2025

=== Injury record ===
N	P	Nat.	Name	Type	Status	Source	Match	Inj. Date	Ret. Date
38	DF	(United Arab Emirates)	Saeed Al-Menhali	cruciate ligament		AlAinClub.ae	Pre-Season	Unknown	13 December 2021
27	MF	(United Arab Emirates)	Sultan Al-Shamsi	muscles rupture		AlAinClub.ae	in training (Pre-Season)	20 July 2021	7 August 2021
70	MF	(United Arab Emirates)	Mohammed Abbas	back muscle		Sharjah24.ae, AlAinClub.ae	in training with UAE	13 November 2021	31 January 2022
27	MF	(United Arab Emirates)	Sultan Al-Shamsi	leg muscle		AlAinClub.ae	vs Al-Ittihad (Friendly)	6 December 2021	20 January 2022
20	DF	(Tunisia)	Yassine Meriah	tear in the right anterior cruciate ligament		AlAinClub.ae	vs Egypt with Tunisia	15 December 2021	15 June 2022
7	FW	(United Arab Emirates)	Caio Canedo	moderate bruise		AlAinClub.ae	vs Al Wasl	17 December 2021	1 January 2022
11	MF	(United Arab Emirates)	Bandar Al-Ahbabi	mild back pain		AlAinClub.ae	vs Al Wasl	17 December 2021	27 December 2021
33	DF	(Ivory Coast)	Kouame Autonne	back muscle tear		AlAinClub.ae	vs Al Wasl	17 December 2021	21 January 2022
9	FW	(Togo)	Kodjo Laba	leg muscle		AlAinClub.ae	vs Al Nasr	21 December 2021	31 January 2022
18	MF	(United Arab Emirates)	Khalid Al-Balochi	muscle injury		AlAinClub.ae	in training	9 January 2022	Unknown
6	MF	(United Arab Emirates)	Yahia Nader			UAEFA.ae	in training with UAE	18 January 2022	3 February 2022
42	MF	(Brazil)	Jonathan Santos			AlAinClub.ae	in training	26 January 2022	Unknown
7	FW	(United Arab Emirates)	Caio Canedo	bruise in his ankle		AlAinClub.ae	in training with UAE	1 February 2022	Unknown

- Player is injured
- Player has recovered from injury
Last updated: 5 April 2022
Source: AlAinClub.ae

== Transfers ==
=== In ===
Date	Position	No.	Name	From	Type	Transfer window	Fee	Team	Ref.
1 June 2021	MF	—	(Syria) Hazem Muhanaeh	(United Arab Emirates) Al-Taawon	Loan return	Summer		Reserve U21	
1 June 2021	DF	—	(Sudan) Waleed Siraj	(United Arab Emirates) Khor Fakkan	Loan return	Summer		First team	
1 June 2021	MF	—	(France) Idriss Mzaouiyani	(United Arab Emirates) Al Dhafra	Loan return	Summer		First team	
1 June 2021	FW	8	(United Arab Emirates) Ali Eid	(United Arab Emirates) Al-Fujairah	Loan return	Summer		First team	
1 June 2021	MF	—	(United Arab Emirates) Falah Waleed	(United Arab Emirates) Khor Fakkan	Loan return	Summer		First team	
1 June 2021	MF	—	(United Arab Emirates) Mohammed Jamal	(United Arab Emirates) Al Jazira	Loan return	Summer		First team	
1 June 2021	MF	27	(United Arab Emirates) Sultan Al-Shamsi	(United Arab Emirates) Baniyas	Transfer	Summer	Free	First team	
7 July 2021	DF	33	(Ivory Coast) Kouame Autonne	(United Arab Emirates) Khor Fakkan	Transfer	Summer	Undisclosed	First team	
14 July 2021	GK	12	(United Arab Emirates) Sultan Al-Mantheri	(United Arab Emirates) Al Wasl	Transfer	Summer	Free	First team	
28 July 2021	DF	20	(Tunisia) Yassine Meriah	(Greece) Olympiacos	Transfer	Summer	€1,500,000	First team	
6 August 2021	DF	74	(Egypt) Adham Khalid	(United Arab Emirates) Al Jazira	Transfer	Summer	Undisclosed	Reserve U21	
8 August 2021	FW	21	(Morocco) Soufiane Rahimi	(Morocco) Raja Casablanca	Transfer	Summer	€2,550,000	First team	
14 August 2021	DF	22	(United Arab Emirates) Saeed Ahmed	(United Arab Emirates) Shabab Al Ahli	Transfer	Summer	Free	First team	
7 January 2022	DF	5	(Colombia) Danilo Arboleda	(Moldova) Sheriff	Transfer	Winter	Free	First team	
31 January 2022	DF	29	(United Arab Emirates) Omar Saeed	(United Arab Emirates) Hatta	Transfer	Winter	Free	First team	
7 February 2022	MF	—	(Brazil) Vítor Hugo	(Italy) Fiorentina U18	Transfer	Winter	Free	Al Ain U19	

=== Loans in ===
No.	Pos	Player	From	Start date	End date	Ref.
10	MF	(Argentina) Cristian Guanca	(Saudi Arabia) Al Shabab	11 July 2021	End of Season	

=== Out ===
Date	Position	No.	Name	To	Fee	Team	Ref.
30 May 2021	MF	29	(United Arab Emirates) Abdullah Sameer	(United Arab Emirates) Hatta	Free transfer	Reserve U21	
6 June 2021	DF	31	(United Arab Emirates) Saoud Al-Abri	(United Arab Emirates) Hatta	Free transfer	Reserve U21	
8 June 2021	MF	—	(Syria) Hazem Muhanaeh	Free agent	End of contract	Reserve U21	
12 June 2021	DF	33	(Japan) Tsukasa Shiotani	Free agent	End of contract	First team	
15 June 2021	MF	99	(United Arab Emirates) Fahad Hadeed	(United Arab Emirates) Khor Fakkan	Free transfer	First team	
26 June 2021	DF	50	(United Arab Emirates) Mohammed Fayez	Free agent	End of contract	First team	
1 July 2021	DF	—	(Sudan) Waleed Siraj	Free agent	End of contract	Reserve U21	
1 July 2021	DF	5	(United Arab Emirates) Ismail Ahmed	Retired		First team	
1 July 2021	MF	22	(Japan) Shoya Nakajima	(Portugal) Porto	End of loan	First team	
8 July 2021	GK	12	(United Arab Emirates) Hamad Al-Mansouri	(United Arab Emirates) Ittihad Kalba	Free transfer	Reserve U21	
12 July 2021	MF	20	(Angola) Wilson Eduardo	Free agent	Contract termination	First team	
27 July 2021	DF	75	(United Arab Emirates) Saif Ghazi	(United Arab Emirates) Al Dhafra	Free transfer	Reserve U21	
30 July 2021	DF	71	(United Arab Emirates) Ali Al-Haidhani	(United Arab Emirates) Al Urooba	Free transfer	First team	
6 August 2021	MF	21	(United Arab Emirates) Mohammed Helal	(United Arab Emirates) Ajman	Free transfer	First team	
27 September 2021	MF	20	(United Arab Emirates) Mohamed Abdulrahman	(United Arab Emirates) Al-Wasl	Free transfer	First team	
6 January 2022	DF	35	(Egypt) Ahmed Jamal	(United Arab Emirates) Hatta	Contract termination	First team	
12 January 2022	MF	—	(Egypt) Omar Yaisien	(United Arab Emirates) Al Hamriyah	Contract termination	First team	
28 January 2022	MF	—	(France) Idriss Mzaouiyani	(United Arab Emirates) Fujairah	Free transfer	First team	

=== Loans out ===
No.	Pos	Name	To	Start date	End date	Ref.
—	MF	(United Arab Emirates) Falah Waleed	(United Arab Emirates) Khor Fakkan	6 July 2021	End of Season	
19	DF	(United Arab Emirates) Mohanad Salem	(United Arab Emirates) Ittihad Kalba	27 July 2021	End of Season	
77	GK	(United Arab Emirates) Ibrahim Al-Kaebi	(United Arab Emirates) Al Urooba	4 October 2021	End of Season	
—	MF	(United Arab Emirates) Mohammed Jamal	(United Arab Emirates) Al Jazira	4 January 2022	End of Season	
99	FW	(United Arab Emirates) Jamal Maroof	(United Arab Emirates) Khor Fakkan	31 January 2022	End of Season	

== Pre-season and friendlies ==
Win Draw Loss Fixtures

24 July 2021 Friendly	UCAM Murcia (Spain)	1–0	(United Arab Emirates) Al Ain	San Pedro del Pinatar, Spain
21:00 GMT+4 (UAE Time)	Moyita 37'	Report +		Stadium: Pinatar Arena Football Center; Attendance: 0 Referee: Pavlo Ivarsky

1 August 2021 Friendly	Real Murcia (Spain)	0–1	(United Arab Emirates) Al Ain	Roldán, Spain
21:00 GMT+4 (UAE Time)		Report + +	Guanca 70'	Stadium: La Torre Golf Resort; Attendance: 0 Referee: Rafael Sánchez López

2 August 2021 Friendly	Al Raed (Saudi Arabia)	0–1	(United Arab Emirates) Al Ain	Los Belones, Spain
21:00 GMT+4 (UAE Time)		Report	Pereira 34'	Stadium: La Manga Club Football; Attendance: 0

6 August 2021 Friendly	Atlético Pulpileño (Spain)	2–3	(United Arab Emirates) Al Ain	Roldán, Spain
21:00 GMT+4 (UAE Time)	Iglesias 30'; Ruiz 60'	Report +	Laba 18'; Meriah 51'; Guanca 88'	Stadium: La Torre Golf Resort; Attendance: 0 Referee: Alejandro Ojaos Valera

7 August 2021 Friendly	Alzira (Spain)	0–1	(United Arab Emirates) Al Ain	San Pedro del Pinatar, Spain
21:00 GMT+4 (UAE Time)		Report +	Maroof 4'	Stadium: Pinatar Arena Football Center; Attendance: 0 Referee: Juan Francisco Roca

13 August 2021 Friendly	Al Nasr (United Arab Emirates)	1–0	(United Arab Emirates) Al Ain	Dubai
19:45 GMT+4 (UAE Time)		Report +	Mendes 57'	Stadium: Al-Maktoum; Attendance: 0

5 September 2021 Friendly	Al Ain (United Arab Emirates)	8–0	(United Arab Emirates) United Sport	Al Ain
		Report		Stadium: Khalifa bin Zayed; Attendance: 0

8 October 2021 Friendly	Al Urooba (United Arab Emirates)	1–0	(United Arab Emirates) Al Ain	Dubai
	A. Moosa 37'	Report		Stadium: Humaid Al Tayer; Attendance: 0

10 November 2021 Friendly	Al Ain (United Arab Emirates)	3–0	(United Arab Emirates) Madenat Alamal	Al Ain
		Report		Stadium: Khalifa bin Zayed; Attendance: 0

14 November 2021 Friendly	Al Ain (United Arab Emirates)	5–0	(United Arab Emirates) Baynounah	Al Ain
		Report		Stadium: Khalifa bin Zayed; Attendance: 0

1 December 2021 Friendly	Al Dhaid (United Arab Emirates)	2–3	(United Arab Emirates) Al Ain	Dubai
		Report		Attendance: 0

6 December 2021 Friendly	Al Ain (United Arab Emirates)	1–1	(Saudi Arabia) Al Ittihad	Dubai
		Report		Attendance: 0

11 December 2021 Friendly	Al Ain (United Arab Emirates)	1–0	(Egypt) Pyramids	Dubai
		Report		Attendance: 0

24 January 2022 Friendly	Al Ain (United Arab Emirates)	3–1	(United Arab Emirates) Al Taawon	Al Ain
18:15 GMT+4 (UAE Time)	Jonatas; Maroof; Al-Shamsi	Report		Stadium: Khalifa bin Zayed; Attendance: 0

29 January 2022 Friendly	Al Ain (United Arab Emirates)	1–2	(Armenia) Pyunik	Al-Ain
17:18 GMT+4 (UAE Time)		Report		Stadium: Hazza Bin Zayed; Attendance: 0

26 March 2022 Friendly	Al-Ain (United Arab Emirates)	1–2	(India) Mumbai City	Al Ain, UAE
		Report	Jahouh (?); Apuia (?)	Stadium: Khalifa bin Zayed Stadium; Attendance: 0

== Competitions ==
=== Overview ===
Competition	First match	Last match	Starting round	Final position	Record							
Competition	First match	Last match	Starting round	Final position	Pld	W	D	L	GF	GA	GD	Win %
Pro-League	20 August 2021	26 May 2022	Matchday 1	Winners	26	20	5	1	57	17	+40	76.92
President's Cup	21 December 2021	15 January 2022	Round of 16	Quarter-finals	2	1	0	1	2	2	+0	50.00
League Cup	15 October 2021	4 May 2022	First round	Winners	7	3	3	1	12	10	+2	42.86
Total					35	24	8	3	71	29	+42	68.57

Last updated: 26 May 2022
Source: Soccerway

=== UAE Pro-League ===
==== League table ====
Pos	Team	Pld	W	D	L	GF	GA	GD	Pts	Qualification or relegation
1	Al Ain (C)	26	20	5	1	57	17	+40	65	Qualification for AFC Champions League group stage
2	Sharjah	26	17	4	5	46	25	+21	55	
3	Al Wahda	26	15	8	3	51	25	+26	53	
4	Al Jazira	26	14	3	9	42	34	+8	45	
5	Shabab Al Ahli	26	12	6	8	33	30	+3	42	

Source: UPLeague
Rules for classification: 1) points; 2) head-to-head goal difference; 3) head-to-head goals scored; 4) head-to-head away goals scored; 5) goal difference; 6) number of goals scored; 7) number of away goals scored; 8) head-to-head points; 9) fair play ranking 10) draw
(C) Champions

==== Results summary ====
Overall								Home						Away					
Pld	W	D	L	GF	GA	GD	Pts	W	D	L	GF	GA	GD	W	D	L	GF	GA	GD
26	20	5	1	57	17	+40	65	10	3	0	30	9	+21	10	2	1	27	8	+19

Last updated: 26 May 2022.
Source: Soccerway

==== Results by round ====
Round	1	2	3	4	5	6	7	8	9	10	11	12	13	14	15	16	17	18	19	20	21	22	23	24	25	26
Ground	A	H	A	H	A	H	A	A	H	A	H	H	A	H	A	H	A	H	A	H	H	A	H	A	A	H
Result	W	W	W	W	D	D	W	D	W	W	W	W	L	W	W	W	W	D	W	W	W	W	W	W	W	D
Position	3	1	1	1	1	1	1	1	1	1	1	1	1	1	1	1	1	1	1	1	1	1	1	1	1	1

Updated to match(es) played on 26 May 2022. Source: UAE Pro League
A = Away; H = Home; W = Win; D = Draw; L = Loss

==== Matches ====
20 August 2021 1	Khor Fakkan	1–3	Al Ain	Khor Fakkan
19:15 GMT+4 (UAE Time)	I. Al Hammadi 48'	Report	Laba 37', 74' (pen.); Autonne 88'	Stadium: Saqr bin Mohammad Al Qassimi; Referee: Sultan Mohamed Saleh; Assistant referees: Ali Rashid Al Nuaimi, Salah Salim; Fourth official: Amer Aldhubiea

25 August 2021 2	Al Ain	2–0	Emirates	Al-Ain
21:30 GMT+4 (UAE Time)	Meriah 27'; Laba 43'	Report		Stadium: Hazza Bin Zayed; Referee: Ammar Al-Jeneibi; Assistant referees: Jasem Abdullah, Hasan Al Hammadi; Fourth official: Khalid Bu Hasan

11 September 2021 3	Baniyas	0–1	Al Ain	Abu Dhabi
18:45 GMT+4 (UAE Time)		Report	Laba 11'	Stadium: Baniyas Stadium; Referee: Ahmed Eisa Darwish; Assistant referees: Masoud Hassan, Ahmed Al Hossani; Fourth official: Mohamed Alharmoodi

17 September 2021 4	Al Ain	4–1	Ittihad Kalba	Al-Ain
21:00 GMT+4 (UAE Time)	Rahimi 2'; Laba 10', 26'; Guanca 51'	Report	Mlapa 50'	Stadium: Hazza Bin Zayed; Referee: Omar Mohamed Alali; Assistant referees: Sabet Obaid, Amer Abdulla Hasan; Fourth official: Khalid Almula

23 September 2021 5	Al Urooba	3–3	Al Ain	Fujairah
18:45 GMT+4 (UAE Time)	S. Obaid 68'; Madan 59', 99'	Report	Laba 29', 38', 43'	Stadium: Fujairah Stadium; Referee: Khalid Bu Hasan; Assistant referees: Masoud Hassan, Amer Al Qadri; Fourth official: Yousuf Alshamali

29 September 2021 6	Al Ain	1–1	Al Wahda	Al-Ain
21:00 GMT+4 (UAE Time)	Rahimi 65'	Report	Kharbin 100'	Stadium: Hazza Bin Zayed; Referee: Mohammed Abdulla Hassan; Assistant referees: Mohamed Ahmed Yousef, Hasan Almahri; Fourth official: Yousif Al Jasmi

21 October 2021 7	Al Wasl	0–2	Al Ain	Dubai
20:30 GMT+4 (UAE Time)	Autonne 33'; Caio 78'	Report		Stadium: Zabeel Stadium; Referee: Sultan Mohamed Saleh; Assistant referees: Ahmed Alrashdi, Saeed Almarzooqi; Fourth official: Khalid Almula

29 October 2021 8	Shabab Al Ahli	1–1	Al Ain	Dubai
20:30 GMT+4 (UAE Time)	Eduardo 46'	Report	Autonne 44'	Stadium: Rashid Stadium; Referee: Ahmed Salim Khalfan; Assistant referees: Hasan Almahri, Jasem Abdulla; Fourth official: Nawwaf Alzeyoudi

2 November 2021 9	Al Ain	1–0	Al Dhafra	Al-Ain
18:00 GMT+4 (UAE Time)	Rahimi 68'	Report		Stadium: Hazza Bin Zayed; Referee: Sultan Abdurazzaq; Assistant referees: Sabet Obaid, Ali Alshehhi; Fourth official: Humaid Khalfan Alshamsi

20 November 2021 10	Al Jazira	1–5	Al Ain	Abu Dhabi
20:15 GMT+4 (UAE Time)	Kosanović 12'	Report	Guanca 24'; Laba 31' (pen.), 49', 90'; Rahimi 45'	Stadium: Al Nahyan Stadium; Referee: Daniele Doveri; Assistant referees: Matteo Passeri, Alessandro Costanzo; Fourth official: Nawwaf Alzeyoudi

25 December 2021 11	Al Ain	3–1	Al Nasr	Al-Ain
19:30 GMT+4 (UAE Time)	Guanca 47' (pen.), 71'; Barman 81'	Report	Tagliabué 65'	Stadium: Hazza Bin Zayed; Referee: Omar Mohamed Alali; Assistant referees: Hasan Almahri, Ali Rashid Al Nuaimi; Fourth official: Yousif Aljasmi

30 December 2021 12	Al Ain	2–1	Ajman	Al-Ain
17:00 GMT+4 (UAE Time)	Laba 36'; M. Ismael 86' (o.g.)	Report	Samardžić 5'	Stadium: Hazza Bin Zayed; Referee: Sultan Abdurazzaq; Assistant referees: Sabet Obaid, Amer Abdulla Hasan; Fourth official: Naser Alali

8 January 2022 13	Sharjah	2–0	Al Ain	Sharjah
19:30 GMT+4 (UAE Time)	Caio 11'; Luanzinho 18'	Report		Stadium: Sharjah Stadium; Referee: Ahmed Salim Khalfan; Assistant referees: Mohamed Ahmed Yousef, Ahmed Alrashdi; Fourth official: Amer Aldhubiea

5 February 2022 14	Al Ain	4–1	Khor Fakkan	Al-Ain
16:15 GMT+4 (UAE Time)	Rahimi 19'; Laba 41' (pen.), 64'; Guanca 59'	Report	H. Nasser 50'	Stadium: Hazza Bin Zayed; Referee: Mohamed Al Harmoodi; Assistant referees: Juma Almukhaini, Mohamed Alobeidli; Fourth official: Zayed Alawlaqi

11 February 2022 15	Emirates	0–3	Al Ain	Ras al-Khaimah
17:30 GMT+4 (UAE Time)		Report	Arboleda 27'; Barman 62'; Laba 71'	Stadium: Emirates Club Stadium; Referee: Sultan Mohamed; Assistant referees: Jasim Al Ajmi, Amer Abdulla; Fourth official: Hasan Al Blooshi

18 February 2022 16	Al Ain	2–0	Baniyas	Al-Ain
17:30 GMT+4 (UAE Time)	Guanca 47'; Rahimi 86'	Report		Stadium: Hazza Bin Zayed; Referee: Ahmed Salim Khalfan; Assistant referees: Ahmed Al Hossani, Ibrahim Al Ajmi; Fourth official: Amer Aldhubiea

25 February 2022 17	Ittihad Kalba	0–2	Al Ain	Kalba
20:00 GMT+4 (UAE Time)		Report	Laba 28' (pen.); Rahimi 63'	Stadium: Ittihad Kalba Stadium; Referee: Adel Al Naqbi; Assistant referees: Khamis Fairooz, Yasser Almurshdi; Fourth official: Naser Alali

4 March 2022 18	Al Ain	1–1	Al Urooba	Al-Ain
17:45 GMT+4 (UAE Time)	Pereira 87'	Report	Madan 38'	Stadium: Hazza Bin Zayed; Referee: Omar Mohamed Alali; Assistant referees: Mohamed Almaazmi, Mohammed Alshehhi; Fourth official: Nawwaf Alzeyoudi

12 March 2022 19	Al Wahda	0–1	Al Ain	Abu Dhabi
20:15 GMT+4 (UAE Time)		Report	Laba 82'	Stadium: Al Nahyan Stadium; Attendance: 15,127; Referee: Danny Makkelie; Assistant referees: Hessel Steegstra, Jan De Vries; Fourth official: Mohamed Al Harmoodi

5 April 2022 20	Al Ain	3–2	Al Wasl	Al-Ain
22:00 GMT+4 (UAE Time)	Laba 29', 89'; Caio 61'	Report	Gilberto 43'; Ali.S 82'	Stadium: Hazza Bin Zayed; Referee: Mohamed Al Harmoodi; Assistant referees: Juma Al Mukhaini, Mohamed Alobeidli; Fourth official: Amer Aldhubiea

30 April 2022 21	Al Ain	1–0	Shabab Al Ahli	Al-Ain
22:00 GMT+4 (UAE Time)	Laba 30'	Report		Stadium: Hazza Bin Zayed; Referee: Sultan Abdurazzaq; Assistant referees: Masoud Hassan, Mohammed Ghulaita Al Shehhi; Fourth official: Khalid Bu Hasan

7 May 2022 22	Al Dhafra	1–0	Al Ain	Abu Dhabi
18:00 GMT+4 (UAE Time)		Report	Caio 30'	Stadium: Hamdan Bin Zayed; Referee: Ahmed Eisa Darwish; Assistant referees: Ahmed Alrashdi, Jasim Al Ajmi; Fourth official: Hasan Ali Mohamed Alblooshi

11 May 2022 23	Al Ain	5–0	Al Jazira	Al-Ain
20:45 GMT+4 (UAE Time)	Laba 15', 36', 50', 71'; Caio 85'	Report		Stadium: Hazza Bin Zayed; Attendance: 15,256; Referee: Omar Mohamed Alali; Assistant referees: Mohamed Ahmed Yousef, Hasan Almahri; Fourth official: Nawwaf Alzeyoudi

17 May 2022 24	Al Nasr	0–1	Al Ain	Dubai
21:00 GMT+4 (UAE Time)		Report	Guanca 61'	Stadium: Al Maktoum Stadium; Referee: Sultan Mohamed Saleh; Assistant referees: Ali Alshehhi, Turki Alzaabi; Fourth official: Yousif Aljasmi

22 May 2022 25	Ajman	0–4	Al Ain	Ajman
18:15 GMT+4 (UAE Time)		Report	Rahimi 14'; Laba 60'; Barman 71'; Guanca 86'	Stadium: Rashid Bin Saeed; Referee: Ali Alzarooni; Assistant referees: Ahmed Alabdouli, Ibrahim Al Ajmi; Fourth official: Fahed Ahmed Khalaf

26 May 2022 26	Al Ain	1–1	Sharjah	Al-Ain
21:00 GMT+4 (UAE Time)	Erik 66'	Report	Caio 38'	Stadium: Hazza Bin Zayed; Referee: Mohammed Abdulla Hassan; Assistant referees: Mohamed Ahmed Yousef, Hasan Almahri; Fourth official: Ahmed Hasan Al Hammadi

=== President's Cup ===
21 December 2021 Round of 16	Al Nasr	0–1	Al Ain	Dubai
19:45		Report	Pereira 80'	Stadium: Al-Maktoum; Referee: Ahmed Salim; Assistant referees: Mohamed Ahmed Yousef; Ahmed Al Hossani; Fourth official: Nawwaf Alzeyoudi

15 January 2022 Quarter-finals	Al Wasl	2–1	Al Ain	Dubai
	Gilberto 60', 90'	Report	Laba 45' (pen.)	Stadium: Zabeel; Referee: Ammar Al-Jeneibi; Assistant referees: Zayed Dawood, Saeed Al Marzooqi; Fourth official: Khalid Bu Hasan

=== League Cup ===
==== First round ====
15 October 2021 First leg	Al Ain	2–0	Emirates	Al Ain
18:15	Guanca 73'; Rahimi 82'	Report		Stadium: Hazza bin Zayed Stadium; Referee: Ali Al Zarouni; Assistant referees: Mohamed Al Maazmi; Hasan Abdulrahman Al Jelani; Fourth official: Ahmad Al Naqbi

26 October 2021 Second leg	Emirates	1–0 (1–2 agg.)	Al Ain	Ras Al Khaimah
18:15	Yago 78'	Report		Stadium: Emirates Club Stadium; Referee: Zayed Alawlaqi; Assistant referees: Ali Alshehhi; Yasser Sabeel Almurshdi; Fourth official: Yousuf Alshamali

==== Quarter-finals ====
17 December 2021 First leg	Al Ain	3–3	Al Wasl	Al Ain
20:15	Laba 19' (pen.), 32'; Caio 46'	Report	Araújo 5', 43', 93'	Stadium: Hazza bin Zayed Stadium; Referee: Adel Al Naqbi; Assistant referees: Salah Salim, Ali Abdulla Shamlan; Fourth official: Zayed Alawlaqi

4 January 2022 Second leg	Al Wasl	3–4 (6–7 agg.)	Al Ain	Dubai
19:30	Jonatas 14' (o.g.); Adryelson 19'; A. Khamis 59'	Report	Guanca 5', 53'; Jonatas 66'; Laba 84' (pen.)	Stadium: Zabeel Stadium; Referee: Ahmed Eisa Darwish; Assistant referees: Hasan Almahri, Ahmed Alabdouli; Fourth official: Ahmed Hasan Al Hammadi

==== Semi-finals ====
1 March 2022 First leg	Al Jazira	1–1	Al Ain	Abu Dhabi
20:00 GMT+4 (UAE Time)	Bruno 51'	Report	Autonne 19'	Stadium: Mohammed bin Zayed; Referee: Ahmed Eisa Darwish; Assistant referees: Hasan Almahri, Mohammed Ghulaita Al Shehhi; Fourth official: Khalid Bu Hasan

8 March 2022 Second leg	Al Ain	0–0	Al Jazira	Al Ain
20:15 GMT+4 (UAE Time)		Report		Stadium: Hazza bin Zayed Stadium; Referee: Mohammed Abdulla Hassan; Assistant referees: Mohamed Ahmed Yousef, Sabet Obaid; Fourth official: Yousif Aljasmi

==== Final ====
4 May 2022	Al Ain	2–2 (5–4 p)	Shabab Al Ahli	Abu Dhabi
19:30 GMT+4 (UAE Time)	Laba 53'; Caio 75'	Report	Cartabia 28', 81'	Stadium: Mohammed bin Zayed; Attendance: 13,000; Referee: Mohamed Alharmoodi; Assistant referees: Saeed Almarzooqi, Waled Al Karmati; Fourth official: Amer Aldhubiea

== Statistics ==
=== Squad appearances and goals ===
Last updated on 26 May 2022.

No.	Pos	Nat	Player	Total		Pro-League		President's Cup		League Cup	
No.	Pos	Nat	Player	Apps	Goals	Apps	Goals	Apps	Goals	Apps	Goals
Goalkeepers
1	GK	(United Arab Emirates) UAE	Mohammed Abo Sandah	2	0	2	0	0	0	0	0
12	GK	(United Arab Emirates) UAE	Sultan Al-Mantheri	1	0	0+1	0	0	0	0	0
17	GK	(United Arab Emirates) UAE	Khalid Eisa	33	0	24	0	2	0	7	0
Defenders
4	DF	(United Arab Emirates) UAE	Mohammed Shaker	16	0	5+5	0	1	0	3+2	0
5	DF	(Colombia) COL	Danilo Arboleda	18	1	13+1	1	1	0	3	0
15	DF	(Brazil) BRA	Erik Menezes	31	1	22+1	1	2	0	5+1	0
20	DF	(Tunisia) TUN	Yassine Meriah	11	1	10	1	0	0	1	0
22	DF	(United Arab Emirates) UAE	Saeed Ahmed	16	0	2+11	0	0	0	2+1	0
23	DF	(United Arab Emirates) UAE	Mohamed Ahmed	10	0	2+4	0	0	0	3+1	0
29	DF	(United Arab Emirates) UAE	Omar Saeed	2	0	1+1	0	0	0	0	0
33	DF	(Ivory Coast) CIV	Kouame Autonne	23	4	15+4	3	0	0	4	1
34	DF	(Brazil) BRA	Rafael Pereira	22	2	12+3	1	2	1	3+2	0
44	DF	(United Arab Emirates) UAE	Saeed Juma	25	0	12+7	0	1	0	3+2	0
74	DF	(Egypt) EGY	Adham Khalid	1	0	0	0	0	0	0+1	0
Midfielders
6	MF	(United Arab Emirates) UAE	Yahia Nader	29	0	16+4	0	2	0	7	0
10	MF	(Argentina) ARG	Cristian Guanca	34	11	25	8	2	0	6+1	3
11	MF	(United Arab Emirates) UAE	Bandar Al-Ahbabi	27	0	19+2	0	1	0	4+1	0
13	MF	(United Arab Emirates) UAE	Ahmed Barman	28	3	19+2	3	2	0	1+4	0
18	MF	(United Arab Emirates) UAE	Khalid Al-Bloushi	17	0	5+8	0	0+1	0	1+2	0
21	MF	(Morocco) MAR	Soufiane Rahimi	30	9	23	8	1	0	5+1	1
25	MF	(United Arab Emirates) UAE	Ali Al-Blooshi	13	0	3+7	0	0+1	0	1+1	0
27	MF	(United Arab Emirates) UAE	Sultan Al-Shamsi	9	0	1+6	0	0	0	1+1	0
42	MF	(Brazil) BRA	Jonathan Santos	23	1	5+10	0	2	0	4+2	1
45	MF	(United Arab Emirates) UAE	Khalifa Al Mazrouei	0	0	0	0	0	0	0	0
70	MF	(United Arab Emirates) UAE	Mohammed Abbas	21	0	13+3	0	0	0	4+1	0
88	MF	(United Arab Emirates) UAE	Naser Al-Shikali	19	0	3+12	0	0+2	0	1+1	0
89	MF	(United Arab Emirates) UAE	Ahmed Al Qatesh	0	0	0	0	0	0	0	0
Forwards
7	FW	(United Arab Emirates) UAE	Caio Canedo	23	6	12+3	4	1	0	5+2	2
8	FW	(United Arab Emirates) UAE	Ali Eid	5	0	0+3	0	0	0	2	0
9	FW	(Togo) TOG	Kodjo Laba	29	31	22	26	2	1	3+2	4
72	FW	(Sudan) SDN	Mohamed Awadalla	0	0	0	0	0	0	0	0
99	FW	(United Arab Emirates) UAE	Jamal Maroof	0	0	0	0	0	0	0	0

=== Clean sheets ===
As of 22 May 2022

Rank	No.	Player	Pro League	League Cup	President's Cup	Total
1	17	(United Arab Emirates) Khalid Eisa	12	2	1	15
2	1	(United Arab Emirates) Mohammed Abo Sandah	1	0	0	1

=== Goalscorers ===
As of 26 May 2022

Includes all competitive matches. The list is sorted alphabetically by surname when total goals are equal.

Rank	No.	Pos.	Player	Pro-League	President's Cup	League Cup	Total
1	9	FW	(Togo) Kodjo Laba	26	1	4	31
2	10	MF	(Argentina) Cristian Guanca	8	0	3	11
3	21	FW	(Morocco) Soufiane Rahimi	8	0	1	9
4	7	FW	(United Arab Emirates) Caio Canedo	4	0	2	6
5	33	DF	(Ivory Coast) Kouame Autonne	3	0	1	4
6	13	MF	(United Arab Emirates) Ahmed Barman	3	0	0	3
7	34	DF	(Brazil) Rafael Pereira	1	1	0	2
8	15	DF	(Brazil) Erik Jorgens	1	0	0	1
8	5	DF	(Colombia) Danilo Arboleda	1	0	0	1
8	42	MF	(Brazil) Jonathan Santos	0	0	1	1
8	20	DF	(Tunisia) Yassine Meriah	1	0	0	1
Own goals				1	0	0	1
Totals				57	2	12	71

=== Disciplinary record ===
N	P	Nat.	Name	Pro-League			League Cup			President's Cup			Total			Notes
N	P	Nat.	Name	Yellow card	Second yellow card	Red card	Yellow card	Second yellow card	Red card	Yellow card	Second yellow card	Red card	Yellow card	Second yellow card	Red card	Notes
70	MF	(United Arab Emirates)	Mohammed Abbas	2			3						5			
9	FW	(Togo)	Kodjo Laba	4	1								4	1		
13	MF	(United Arab Emirates)	Ahmed Barman	4									4			
34	DF	(Brazil)	Rafael Pereira	4									4			
15	DF	(Brazil)	Erik Jorgens	3			1						4			
6	MF	(United Arab Emirates)	Yahia Nader	2						2			4			
21	FW	(Morocco)	Soufiane Rahimi	3									3			
42	MF	(Brazil)	Jonathan Santos	2			1						3			
33	DF	(Ivory Coast)	Kouame Autonne	2			1						3			
7	FW	(United Arab Emirates)	Caio Canedo	2									2			
10	MF	(Argentina)	Cristian Guanca	1			1						2			
4	DF	(United Arab Emirates)	Mohammed Shaker				1			1			2			
20	DF	(Tunisia)	Yassine Meriah	2									2			
11	MF	(United Arab Emirates)	Bandar Al-Ahbabi	1									1			
88	MF	(United Arab Emirates)	Naser Al-Shikali	1									1			
23	DF	(United Arab Emirates)	Mohamed Ahmed				1						1			
25	MF	(United Arab Emirates)	Ali Al-Balochi				1						1			
17	GK	(United Arab Emirates)	Khalid Eisa	1									1			

Last updated: 26 May 2022
Source: UAEProLeague.ae, AlAinClub.ae
Only competitive matches
(yellow card) = Number of bookings; (second yellow card) = Number of sending offs after a second yellow card; (red card) = Number of sending offs by a direct red card.

=== Assists ===
As of 26 May 2022

No.	Player	Pro-League	President's Cup	League Cup	Total
10	(Argentina) Cristian Guanca	7	1	1	9
21	(Morocco) Soufiane Rahimi	9	0	0	9
11	(United Arab Emirates) Bandar Al-Ahbabi	5	0	2	7
15	(Brazil) Erik Menezes	3	0	2	5
9	(Togo) Kodjo Laba	5	0	0	5
7	(United Arab Emirates) Caio Canedo	1	0	2	3
42	(Brazil) Jonathan Santos	2	0	0	2
27	(United Arab Emirates) Sultan Al-Shamsi	1	0	0	1
17	(United Arab Emirates) Khalid Eisa	0	0	1	1
33	(Tunisia) Yassine Meriah	1	0	0	1
33	(Ivory Coast) Kouame Autonne	1	0	0	1
44	(United Arab Emirates) Saeed Juma	1	0	0	1
23	(United Arab Emirates) Mohamed Ahmed	0	0	1	1
13	(United Arab Emirates) Ahmed Barman	1	0	0	1
88	(United Arab Emirates) Naser Al-Shikali	1	0	0	1
Totals		38	1	9	48

=== Hat-tricks ===
Player	Against	Result	Date	Round
(Togo) Kodjo Laba	Al Urooba	3–3 (A)	24 September 2021	5
(Togo) Kodjo Laba	Al Jazira	1–5 (A)	20 November 2021	10
(Togo) Kodjo Laba^{4}	Al Jazira	5–0 (H)	11 May 2022	23

^{4} – Player scored four goals.

== Awards ==
=== Pro League Monthly awards ===
Month	Manager of the Month	Player of the Month	Goalkeeper of the Month	References
August	(Ukraine) Serhii Rebrov	(Togo) Kodjo Laba		
September	(Ukraine) Serhii Rebrov	(Morocco) Soufiane Rahimi		
October	(Ukraine) Serhii Rebrov	(Ivory Coast) Kouame Autonne	(United Arab Emirates) Khalid Eisa	
November	(Ukraine) Serhii Rebrov	(Morocco) Soufiane Rahimi	(United Arab Emirates) Khalid Eisa	
December	(Ukraine) Serhii Rebrov			
January	(Ukraine) Serhii Rebrov			
February	(Ukraine) Serhii Rebrov	(Morocco) Soufiane Rahimi	(United Arab Emirates) Khalid Eisa	
March	(Ukraine) Serhii Rebrov		(United Arab Emirates) Khalid Eisa	
