= 2022–23 Al Ain FC season =

Al Ain
2022–23 season
- President: Mohammed Bin Zayed
- Manager: Serhii Rebrov (from 6 June 2021 until 27 May 2023); Alfred Schreuder (from 27 May 2023)
- Stadium: Hazza Bin Zayed
- UAE Pro-League: 2nd
- President's Cup: Runners–up
- UAE League Cup: Runners–up
- UAE Super Cup: Runners–up
- Top goalscorer: League: Kodjo Laba (28); All: Kodjo Laba (31)
Home colours	Away colours
- All statistics correct as of 27 May 2023.

The 2022–23 Al Ain Football Club season was the club's 55th in existence and their 48th consecutive season in the top-level football league in the UAE.

== Club ==
=== Technical staff ===
Position	Name
Head coach	(Ukraine) Serhii Rebrov
Assistant coach	(Spain) Vicente Gómez (United Arab Emirates) Ahmed Abdullah
Assistant coach and analyst	(Spain) Alberto Bosch
Fitness coach	(Spain) Jesus Pinedo (Italy) Alessandro Sarrocco
Goalkeeping coach	(Romania) Radu Lefter (Romania) Dan Zdrinca
Physiotherapist	(Brazil) Felipe Perseu
U-21 team head coach	(Iraq) Ghazi Fahad
Team Manager	(United Arab Emirates) Ahmed Al Shamsi
First and U21 team supervisor	(United Arab Emirates) Abdullah Al Shamsi

Last updated: 18 July 2021

=== Board of directors ===
Office	Name
President	(United Arab Emirates) Mohammed Bin Zayed Al Nahyan
Vice President Chairman of the Board of Directors of Al Ain SCC	(United Arab Emirates) Hazza Bin Zayed Al Nahyan
Vice Chairman of the Board of Directors of Al Ain SCC Chairman of the Executive Committee	(United Arab Emirates) Sultan bin Hamdan bin Zayed
Chairman of Board of Directors	(United Arab Emirates) Matar Al Darmaki
Vice Chairman of Board of Directors	(United Arab Emirates) Khaled Al Dhaheri
Board of Directors Member	(United Arab Emirates) Matar Al Dhaheri
Board of Directors Member	(United Arab Emirates) Salem Al Jneibi
Board of Directors Member	(United Arab Emirates) Majid Al Owais

Last updated: 25 May 2022
Source: Al Ain Club

== Players ==
=== First Team ===
No	Position	Player	Nation
1	GK	UAE	Mohammed Abo Sandah
2	MF	MAR	El Mehdi El Moubarik
3	DF	UAE	Kouame Autonne
6	MF	UAE	Yahia Nader
7	FW	UAE	Caio Canedo
8	MF	UAE	Mohammed Abbas ^{U21}
9	FW	TOG	Kodjo Laba
10	MF	UKR	Andriy Yarmolenko
11	DF	UAE	Bandar Al-Ahbabi (captain)
12	GK	UAE	Sultan Al-Mantheri
13	MF	UAE	Ahmed Barman
14	FW	GHA	Sampson Agyapong
15	DF	BRA	Erik
16	DF	CRO	Tin Jedvaj
17	GK	UAE	Khalid Eisa (3rd captain)
18	MF	UAE	Khalid Al-Balochi
20	MF	ARG	Matías Palacios
21	FW	MAR	Soufiane Rahimi
22	MF	UAE	Saeed Ahmed
23	DF	UAE	Mohamed Ahmed (vice-captain)
26	MF	UAE	Ahmed Al-Qatesh ^{U21}
29	DF	UAE	Omar Saeed
34	DF	BRA	Rafael Pereira
42	MF	BRA	Jonathan Santos
44	DF	UAE	Saeed Juma
45	MF	UAE	Khalifa Obaid ^{U21}
72	FW	SDN	Mohamed Awadalla ^{U21}
74	DF	EGY	Adham Khalid ^{U21}
78	MF	UAE	Falah Waleed
86	DF	UKR	Danylo Udod ^{U21} (on loan from Shakhtar Donetsk)
88	MF	UAE	Naser Al-Shikali
90	FW	UAE	Eisa Khalfan ^{U21}
92	GK	UAE	Saif Al-Mazmi ^{U21}
98	DF	UAE	Salem Abdullah

=== Unregistered players ===
No	Position	Player	Nation
5	DF	COL	Danilo Arboleda

=== New contracts ===
Date	Pos	No.	Player	Ref.	Notes
9 February 2023	FW	9	(Togo) Kodjo Laba		2026

== Transfers ==
=== In ===
Date	Position	No.	Name	From	Type	Transfer window	Fee	Team	Ref.
30 June 2022	MF	—	(United Arab Emirates) Falah Waleed	(United Arab Emirates) Khor Fakkan	Loan return	Summer		First team	
30 June 2022	FW	99	(United Arab Emirates) Jamal Maroof	(United Arab Emirates) Khor Fakkan	Loan return	Summer		First team	
30 June 2022	DF	—	(United Arab Emirates) Mohanad Salem	(United Arab Emirates) Ittihad Kalba	Loan return	Summer		First team	
30 June 2022	GK	—	(United Arab Emirates) Ibrahim Al-Kaebi	(United Arab Emirates) Al Urooba	Loan return	Summer		First team	
30 June 2022	MF	—	(United Arab Emirates) Mohammed Jamal	(United Arab Emirates) Al Jazira	Loan return	Summer		First team	
13 July 2022	FW	—	(Ukraine) Andriy Yarmolenko	(England) West Ham United	Free transfer	Summer		First team	
14 July 2022	MF	—	(Argentina) Matías Palacios	(Switzerland) Basel	Transfer	Summer		First team	

=== Loans in ===
No.	Pos	Player	From	Start date	End date	Ref.
—	DF	(Croatia) Tin Jedvaj	(Russia) Lokomotiv Moscow	20 December 2022	End of Season	

=== Out ===
Date	Position	No.	Name	To	Fee	Team	Ref.
1 July 2022	MF	10	(Argentina) Cristian Guanca	(Saudi Arabia) Al Shabab	End of loan	First team	
1 July 2022	GK	—	(United Arab Emirates) Ibrahim Al-Kaebi	(United Arab Emirates) Emirates	Free transfer	First team	
14 July 2022	MF	25	(United Arab Emirates) Ali Al-Balochi	(United Arab Emirates) Al Bataeh	Free transfer	Reserve U21	
18 July 2022	FW	8	(United Arab Emirates) Ali Eid	(United Arab Emirates) Al Dhafra	Contract termination	First team	
18 July 2022	MF	14	(United Arab Emirates) Rayan Yaslam	(United Arab Emirates) Sharjah	Contract termination	First team	
18 July 2022	MF	—	(United Arab Emirates) Mohammed Jamal	(United Arab Emirates) Al Jazira	Contract termination	First team	
31 July 2022	DF	—	(United Arab Emirates) Saeed Al-Menhali		End of contract	Al Ain	
2 August 2022	DF	20	(Tunisia) Yassine Meriah	(Tunisia) Espérance de Tunis	Contract termination	First team	
3 August 2022	FW	99	(United Arab Emirates) Jamal Maroof	(United Arab Emirates) Dibba	Contract termination	First team	
1 September 2022	DF	2	(United Arab Emirates) Saoud Al-Mahri	(United Arab Emirates) Al Arabi	Free transfer	Reserve U21	
28 September 2022	MF	—	(Serbia) Andrija Radovanovic	(United Arab Emirates) Hatta	End of contract	Reserve U21	

=== Loans out ===
No.	Pos	Name	To	Start date	End date	Ref.
30	MF	(United Arab Emirates) Mohammed Khalfan	(United Arab Emirates) Al Bataeh	18 July 2022	End of Season	
27	MF	(United Arab Emirates) Sultan Al-Shamsi	(United Arab Emirates) Al Nasr	10 January 2023	End of Season	
4	DF	(United Arab Emirates) Mohammed Shaker	(United Arab Emirates) Al Nasr	8 February 2023	End of Season	
33	DF	(Italy) Gianluca Santini ^{U21}	(United Arab Emirates) Masfout		End of Season	

== Competitions ==
=== Overview ===
Competition	First match	Last match	Starting round	Final position	Record							
Competition	First match	Last match	Starting round	Final position	Pld	W	D	L	GF	GA	GD	Win %
Pro-League	2 September 2022	12 May 2023	Matchday 1	2nd	26	16	6	4	67	31	+36	61.54
President's Cup	8 December 2022	28 April 2023	Round of 32	Runners–up	6	4	1	1	9	1	+8	66.67
League Cup	12 December 2022	27 May 2023	Quarter-finals	Runners–up	5	1	2	2	6	5	+1	20.00
UAE Super Cup	25 February 2023		Final	Runners–up	1	0	0	1	0	1	−1	0.00
Total					38	21	9	8	82	38	+44	55.26

Last updated: 27 May 2023
Source: Soccerway

=== Pro League ===
==== League table ====
Pos	Team	Pld	W	D	L	GF	GA	GD	Pts	Qualification or relegation
1	Shabab Al Ahli (C)	26	17	6	3	53	25	+28	57	Qualification for AFC Champions League play off round
2	Al Ain	26	16	6	4	67	31	+36	54	Qualification for AFC Champions League group stage (Note: since Al Ain won the 2021–22 UAE Pro League, they qualified directly to the AFC Champions League group stage meanwhile this seasons league champions will qualify for the play-off round.)
3	Al Wahda	26	15	7	4	48	26	+22	52	
4	Al Wasl	26	13	8	5	53	32	+21	47	
5	Al Jazira	26	14	4	8	50	39	+11	46	

Source: UPLeague
Rules for classification: 1) points; 2) head-to-head goal difference; 3) head-to-head goals scored; 4) head-to-head away goals scored; 5) goal difference; 6) number of goals scored; 7) number of away goals scored; 8) head-to-head points; 9) fair play ranking 10) draw
(C) Champions

==== Results summary ====
Overall								Home						Away					
Pld	W	D	L	GF	GA	GD	Pts	W	D	L	GF	GA	GD	W	D	L	GF	GA	GD
26	16	6	4	67	31	+36	54	8	3	2	36	14	+22	8	3	2	31	17	+14

Last updated: 12 May 2023.
Source: Soccerway

==== Results by round ====
Round	1	2	3	4	5	6	7	8	9	10	11	12	13	14	15	16	17	18	19	20	21	22	23	24	25	26
Ground	A	H	A	H	A	H	A	A	H	A	H	H	A	H	A	H	A	H	A	H	H	A	H	A	A	H
Result	D	W	L	W	W	L	W	L	W	D	D	D	W	W	W	W	W	W	W	L	D	W	W	D	W	W
Position	7	3	8	4	4	4	3	8	7	8	7	7	7	7	5	4	3	3	2	2	2	2	2	2	2	2

Updated to match(es) played on 12 May 2023. Source: UAE Pro League
A = Away; H = Home; W = Win; D = Draw; L = Loss

==== Matches ====
2 September 2022 1	Ajman	1–1	Al Ain	Ajman
17:45 GMT+4 (UAE Time)	Madan 60'	Report	Erik 6'	Stadium: Rashid Bin Saeed; Referee: Ahmed Eisa Darwish; Assistant referees: Ali Rashid Al Nuaimi, Ibrahim Al Ajmi; Fourth official: Naser Al Ali

10 September 2022 2	Al Ain	7–0	Al Dhafra	Al-Ain
17:45 GMT+4 (UAE Time)	Laba 11', 29', 43', 68'; Yarmolenko 35'; Arboleda 81'; Rahimi 89'	Report		Stadium: Hazza Bin Zayed; Referee: Sultan Abdurazzaq; Assistant referees: Mohammed Ghulaita Al Shehhi, Khamis Fairooz; Fourth official: Yousif Al Jasmi

15 September 2022 3	Al Jazira	2–1	Al Ain	Abu Dhabi
20:30 GMT+4 (UAE Time)	Ramadan 19'; Mabkhout 52'	Report	Laba 39'	Stadium: Mohammed bin Zayed Stadium; Referee: Omar Mohamed Al Ali; Assistant referees: Mohamed Ahmed Yousef, Waled Al Karmati; Fourth official: Mohamed Abdalla Al Harmoodi

2 October 2022 4	Al Ain	3–0	Ittihad Kalba	Al-Ain
20:00 GMT+4 (UAE Time)	Rahimi 15'; Laba 52'; Caio 79'	Report		Stadium: Hazza Bin Zayed; Referee: Adel Al Naqbi; Assistant referees: Jasem Abdulla, Yasser Sabeel Al Murshdi; Fourth official: Mohamed Abdalla Al Harmoodi

7 October 2022 5	Dibba	0–2	Al Ain	Dibba Al-Fujairah
17:15 GMT+4 (UAE Time)		Report	Yarmolenko 6'; Laba 90'	Stadium: Dibba Stadium; Referee: Yousif Al Jasmi; Assistant referees: Salah Salim, Amer Al Qadri; Fourth official: Hasan Ali Mohamed Al Blooshi

15 October 2022 6	Al Ain	2–3	Al Wahda	Al-Ain
20:00 GMT+4 (UAE Time)	Rahimi 13', 57'	Report	Silva 43'; Pedro 45'; Barman 47' (o.g.)	Stadium: Hazza Bin Zayed; Referee: Artur Soares Dias; Assistant referees: Rui Barbosa, Paulo Soares; Fourth official: Ahmed Eisa Darwish

22 October 2022 7	Al Nasr	1–3	Al Ain	Dubai
20:00 GMT+4 (UAE Time)	Mendes 48'	Report	Yarmolenko 5'; Laba 76', 93'	Stadium: Al Maktoum Stadium; Referee: Mohammed Abdulla Hassan; Assistant referees: Mohamed Ahmed Yousef, Hasan Al Mahri; Fourth official: Suhail Abdulla Ali

29 October 2022 8	Shabab Al Ahli	2–1	Al Ain	Dubai
20:00 GMT+4 (UAE Time)	Khribin 43'; Ganiev 74'	Report	Marzooq 10' (o.g.)	Stadium: Rashid Stadium; Referee: Ahmed Salim Khalfan; Assistant referees: Ahmed Al Rashdi, Talal Rashid Al Nuaimi; Fourth official: Naser Al Ali

4 November 2022 9	Al Ain	2–1	Khor Fakkan	Al-Ain
16:45 GMT+4 (UAE Time)	Autonne 52'; Laba 80'	Report	Abeid 7'	Stadium: Hazza Bin Zayed; Referee: Sultan Abdurazzaq; Assistant referees: Juma Al Mukhaini, Ibrahim Al Ajmi; Fourth official: Ahmed Hasan Hussain Bilal

12 November 2022 10	Sharjah	2–2	Al Ain	Sharjah
19:30 GMT+4 (UAE Time)	Camara 13'; Alcácer 77'	Report	Rahimi 87', 90'	Stadium: Sharjah Stadium; Referee: Srdjan Jovanovic; Assistant referees: Uros Stojkovic, Milan Mihajlovic; Fourth official: Suhail Abdulla Ali

20 December 2022 11	Al Ain	2–2	Baniyas	Al-Ain
19:30 GMT+4 (UAE Time)	Yarmolenko 28'; Laba 54' (pen.)	Report	Giménez 31'; El Moubarik 36' (o.g.)	Stadium: Hazza Bin Zayed; Referee: Sultan Mohamed Saleh; Assistant referees: Sabet Obaid, Waled Al Karmati; Fourth official: Zayed Alawlaqi

24 December 2022 12	Al Ain	1–1	Al Wasl	Al-Ain
19:30 GMT+4 (UAE Time)	Laba 8'	Report	Lima 33'	Stadium: Hazza Bin Zayed; Referee: Adel Al Naqbi

22 January 2023 13	Al Bataeh	2–3	Al Ain	Khor Fakkan
20:00 GMT+4 (UAE Time)	Autonne 60' (o.g.); Lourency 81'	Report	Laba 27', 87'; Yarmolenko 35'; Erik (red card) 45+6'	Stadium: Saqr bin Mohammed Al Qasimi; Referee: Yahya Al Mulla

27 January 2023 14	Al Ain	5–1	Ajman	Al-Ain
17:15 GMT+4 (UAE Time)	Laba 4', 83'; Yarmolenko 31', 37'; Al-Ahbabi 70'	Report	Mboungou 48'	Stadium: Hazza Bin Zayed; Referee: Adel Al Naqbi

5 February 2023 15	Al Dhafra	1–4	Al Ain	Abu Dhabi
17:30 GMT+4 (UAE Time)	Leonço ((8)	Report	Erik 5'; Laba 47' (pen.); Yarmolenko 47'; Rahimi 56'	Stadium: Hamdan Bin Zayed; Referee: Yousif Al Jasmi

11 February 2023 16	Al Ain	3–2	Al Jazira	Al-Ain
20:15 GMT+4 (UAE Time)	Rahimi 70'; Laba 37', 94' (pen.)	Report	Bruno 24'; Ramadan 29'	Stadium: Hazza Bin Zayed; Referee: Adel Al Naqbi

17 February 2023 17	Ittihad Kalba	2–3	Al Ain	Kalba
17:30 GMT+4 (UAE Time)	Al Fardan 47'; Cicâldău 94' (pen.)	Report	Caio 21'; Rahimi 81'; Laba 97'	Stadium: Ittihad Kalba Stadium; Referee: Mohamed Abdalla Al Harmoodi

2 March 2023 18	Al Ain	3–0	Dibba	Al Ain
17:30 GMT+4 (UAE Time)	Caio 11'; Rahimi 61'; Santos 81'	Report		Stadium: Hazza bin Zayed Stadium; Referee: Nawwaf Al Zeyoudi

10 March 2023 19	Al Wahda	0–3	Al Ain	Abu Dhabi
20:30 GMT+4 (UAE Time)		Report	Jedvaj 25'; Laba 65'; Caio 68'	Stadium: Al Nahyan Stadium; Referee: István Kovács

17 March 2023 20	Al Ain	0–1	Al Nasr	Al-Ain
20:30 GMT+4 (UAE Time)		Report	Toure 75'	Stadium: Hazza Bin Zayed; Referee: Sultan Abdurazzaq

1 April 2023 21	Al Ain	1–1	Shabab Al Ahli	Al-Ain
22:00 GMT+4 (UAE Time)	Laba 80'	Report	Bala 68'	Stadium: Hazza Bin Zayed; Referee: Ahmed Salim Khalfan

9 April 2023 22	Khor Fakkan	0–3	Al Ain	Khor Fakkan
22:00 GMT+4 (UAE Time)		Report	Erik 54'; Laba 63'; Yarmolenko 66'	Stadium: Saqr bin Mohammad Al Qassimi; Referee: Sultan Mohamed Saleh

19 April 2023 23	Al Ain	2–0	Sharjah	Al-Ain
22:00 GMT+4 (UAE Time)	Laba 4', 86'	Report		Stadium: Hazza Bin Zayed; Referee: Sultan Abdurazzaq

23 April 2023 24	Baniyas	2–2	Al Ain	Abu Dhabi
20:45 GMT+4 (UAE Time)	Giménez 90'; Barman 97' (o.g.)	Report	Laba 48'; Rahimi 61'	Stadium: Baniyas Stadium; Referee: Sultan Mohamed Saleh

7 May 2023 25	Al Wasl	2–3	Al Ain	Dubai
21:00 GMT+4 (UAE Time)	Diallo 5'; Lima 90' (pen.)	Report	Al-Ahbabi 52', 72'; Santos 102'	Stadium: Zabeel Stadium; Referee: Ahmed Salim Khalfan

12 May 2023 26	Al Ain	5–2	Al Bataeh	Al-Ain
18:15 GMT+4 (UAE Time)	Laba 20', 46'; Yarmolenko 2', 60'; Santos 79'	Report	Lourency 53'; Abang 69'	Stadium: Hazza Bin Zayed; Referee: Adel Al Naqbi

=== UAE President's Cup ===
8 December 2022 R32	Al Ain	4–0	Dibba	Al Ain
16:45	Laba 45+2' (pen.); Caio 75', 84'; Erik 87'	Report		Stadium: Hazza bin Zayed Stadium; Referee: Hamad Ali Yousef; Assistant referees: Mohammed Ghulaita Al Shehhi; Turki Al Zaabi; Fourth official: Khalid Al Mula

1 February 2023 R16	Khor Fakkan	0–1	Al Ain	Khor Fakkan
17:10		Report	F. Waleed 73'	Stadium: Saqr bin Mohammed Al Qasimi; Referee: Yahya Al Mulla; Assistant referees: Talal Rashid Al Nuaimi, Ibrahim Al Ajmi; Fourth official: Naser Al Ali

6 March 2023 QF	Shabab Al Ahli	0–2	Al Ain	Dubai
20:30		Report	Palacios 7'; Laba 80' (pen.)	Stadium: Rashid Stadium; Referee: Omar Mohamed Al Ali; Man of the Match: El Mehdi El Moubarik

==== Semi-finals ====
5 April 2023 First leg	Al Wasl	0–0	Al Ain	Dubai
22:00		Report		Stadium: Zabeel Stadium; Referee: Mohamed Abdalla Alharmoodi

14 April 2023 Second leg	Al Ain	1–0 (1–0 agg.)	Al Wasl	Al Ain
22:00	Erik 25'	Report		Stadium: Hazza Bin Zayed; Referee: Omar Mohamed Al Ali

==== Final ====
28 April 2023	Al Ain	1–1 (13–14 p)	Sharjah	Al Nahyan, Abu Dhabi
19:25	Laba 56'	Report	Abdulbasit 48'	Stadium: Mohammed bin Zayed Stadium
	Penalties
	Yarmolenko (penalty scored); Erik (penalty scored); Laba (penalty scored); Palacios (penalty scored); Al-Ahbabi (penalty scored); Nader (penalty scored); Autonne (penalty scored); Barman (penalty scored); El Moubarik (penalty missed); Santos (penalty scored); Abo Sandah (penalty scored); Yarmolenko (penalty scored); Laba (penalty scored); Palacios (penalty missed)		(penalty scored) Caio; (penalty scored) Alcácer; (penalty scored) Luanzinho; (penalty scored) Ba Wazir; (penalty scored) Meloni; (penalty scored) Ibrahim; (penalty scored) Abdulrahman; (penalty scored) Rashid; (penalty missed) Manolas; (penalty scored) Suroor; (penalty scored) Al-Hosani; (penalty scored) Caio; (penalty scored) Alcácer; (penalty scored) Luanzinho

=== UAE League Cup ===
==== Quarter-finals ====
12 December 2022 1st leg	Al Ain	0–0	Al Wahda	Al Ain
19:30		Report		Stadium: Hazza Bin Zayed; Referee: Mohamed Al Harmoodi

16 December 2022 2nd leg	Al Wahda	1–1	Al Ain	Abu Dhabi
19:30	Pedro 25'	Report	Rahimi 72'	Stadium: Al Nahyan Stadium; Referee: Ahmed Salim Khalfan

==== Semi-finals ====
17 May 2023 1st leg	Al Ain	4–1	Al Nasr	Al Ain
19:35	Yarmolenko 59' (pen.); Palacios 69'; Rahimi 77', 94'	Report	Taarabt 92'	Stadium: Hazza Bin Zayed; Referee: Omar Mohamed Alali

21 May 2023 2nd leg	Al Nasr	1–0 (2–4 agg.)	Al Ain	Dubai
19:35	Taarabt 59'	Report		Stadium: Al Maktoum Stadium; Referee: Adel Al Naqbi

==== Final ====
27 May 2023	Al Ain	1–2	Sharjah	Abu Dhabi
19:45	Autonne 30'	Report	Luanzinho 52'; Caio 55'	Stadium: Al Nahyan Stadium; Referee: Ahmed Salim Khalfan

=== UAE Super Cup ===
25 February 2023 Final	Sharjah	1–0	Al Ain	Dubai
20:30	Laba 29' (o.g.)	Report		Stadium: Al Maktoum Stadium; Referee: Szymon Marciniak

== Statistics ==
=== Clean sheets ===
As of 19 April 2023

Rank	No.	Player	Pro League	League Cup	President's Cup	Super Cup	Total
1	17	(United Arab Emirates) Khalid Eisa	7	1	5		13
2	1	(United Arab Emirates) Mohammed Abo Sandah			1		1

=== Goalscorers ===
As of 27 May 2023

Includes all competitive matches. The list is sorted alphabetically by surname when total goals are equal.

Rank	No.	Pos.	Player	Pro-League	President's Cup	League Cup	Total
1	9	FW	(Togo) Kodjo Laba	28	3	0	31
2	21	FW	(Morocco) Soufiane Rahimi	11	0	3	14
3	10	FW	(Ukraine) Andriy Yarmolenko	11	0	1	12
4	7	FW	(United Arab Emirates) Caio Canedo	4	2	0	6
5	15	DF	(Brazil) Erik Jorgens	3	2	0	5
6	42	MF	(Brazil) Jonathan Santos	3	0	0	3
6	11	MF	(United Arab Emirates) Bandar Al-Ahbabi	3	0	0	3
8	33	DF	(Ivory Coast) Kouame Autonne	1	0	1	2
8	20	MF	(Argentina) Matías Palacios	0	1	1	2
10	16	DF	(Croatia) Tin Jedvaj	1	0	0	1
10	78	MF	(United Arab Emirates) Falah Waleed	0	1	0	1
10	5	DF	(Colombia) Danilo Arboleda	1	0	0	1
Own goals (from the opponents)				1	0	0	1
Totals				67	9	6	82

=== Assists ===
As of 17 May 2023

No.	Player	Pro-League	President's Cup	League Cup	Total
21	(Morocco) Soufiane Rahimi	11	1	1	13
11	(United Arab Emirates) Bandar Al-Ahbabi	6	0	2	8
9	(Togo) Kodjo Laba	8	0	0	8
15	(Brazil) Erik Menezes	6	1	0	7
10	(Ukraine) Andriy Yarmolenko	4	0	0	4
33	(Ivory Coast) Kouame Autonne	3	0	0	3
44	(United Arab Emirates) Saeed Juma	2	0	0	2
10	(Argentina) Matías Palacios	2	1	0	3
7	(United Arab Emirates) Caio Canedo	2	0	0	2
90	(United Arab Emirates) Eisa Khalfan	0	0	1	1
42	(Brazil) Jonathan Santos	1	0	0	1
6	(United Arab Emirates) Yahia Nader	1	0	0	1
18	(United Arab Emirates) Khalid Al-Balochi	1	0	0	1
22	(United Arab Emirates) Saeed Ahmed	1	0	0	1
Totals		48	3	4	55

=== Hat-tricks ===
Player	Against	Result	Date	Round
(Togo) Kodjo Laba^{4}	Al Dhafra	7–0 (H)	10 September 2022	2

^{4} – Player scored four goals.
