= 2018–19 Al Ain FC season =

Al Ain
2018–19 season
- President: Mohammed Bin Zayed
- Manager: Zoran Mamic Until 30 January 2019 Zeljko Sopic From 30 January 2019 Until 18 February 2019 Juan Carlos Garrido From 18 February 2019
- Stadium: Hazza Bin Zayed Stadium
- UAE Pro-League: 4th
- President's Cup: Round of 16
- League Cup: Quarter Finals
- UAE Super Cup: Runners–up
- AFC Champions League: Group stage
- FIFA Club World Cup: Runners–up
- Top goalscorer: League: Marcus Berg (10 goals); All: Caio (17 goals)
Home colours	Away colours	Third colours

The 2018–19 season was Al Ain Football Club's 51st in existence and the club's 44th consecutive season in the top-level football league in the UAE. In December 2018, Al Ain which celebrated the 50th anniversary participating in the 2018 FIFA Club World Cup, representing the host nation as the reigning champions of the UAE Pro-League, Al Ain defeated Copa Libertadores champions River Plate by penalties hosted in home stadium Hazza Bin Zayed Stadium to enter the final for the first time in team history and became the first Emirati club to reach the decisive match. The final, on 22 December, was lost 4–1 to UEFA Champions League winners Real Madrid at the Zayed Sports City Stadium in Abu Dhabi.

== Players ==
=== First Team ===
No	Position	Nation	Player
1	GK	(United Arab Emirates) UAE	Mohammed Abo Sandah
12	GK	(United Arab Emirates) UAE	Hamad Al-Mansouri
17	GK	(United Arab Emirates) UAE	Khalid Eisa
2	DF	(United Arab Emirates) UAE	Ali Al Haidhani
3	DF	(Mali) MLI	Tongo Doumbia
4	DF	(United Arab Emirates) UAE	Saeed Musabbeh
5	DF	(United Arab Emirates) UAE	Ismail Ahmed
14	DF	(United Arab Emirates) UAE	Mohammed Fayez
15	DF	(United Arab Emirates) UAE	Khaled Abdulrahman
19	DF	(United Arab Emirates) UAE	Mohanad Salem
23	DF	(United Arab Emirates) UAE	Mohamed Ahmed
33	DF	(Japan) JPN	Tsukasa Shiotani
44	DF	(United Arab Emirates) UAE	Saeed Juma
45	DF	(United Arab Emirates) UAE	Abdulrahman Almahri
50	DF	(Egypt) EGY	Ahmed Jamal
56	DF	(United Arab Emirates) UAE	Salem Abdullah
62	DF	(United Arab Emirates) UAE	Khalid Al Bloushi
6	MF	(United Arab Emirates) UAE	Amer Abdulrahman
7	MF	(Brazil) BRA	Caio
8	MF	(United Arab Emirates) UAE	Hazem Fayez
11	MF	(United Arab Emirates) UAE	Bandar Al-Ahbabi
13	MF	(United Arab Emirates) UAE	Ahmed Barman
16	MF	(United Arab Emirates) UAE	Mohamed Abdulrahman
18	MF	(Ivory Coast) CIV	Ibrahim Diaky
28	MF	(United Arab Emirates) UAE	Sulaiman Nasser
29	MF	(Egypt) EGY	Mohamed Fathy
43	MF	(United Arab Emirates) UAE	Rayan Yaslam
51	MF	(United Arab Emirates) UAE	Khalid Al-Bloushi
54	MF	(Palestine) PLE	Abdalla Mazen
58	MF	(United Arab Emirates) UAE	Falah Waleed
74	MF	(Egypt) EGY	Hussein El Shahat
88	MF	(Egypt) EGY	Yahia Nader
9	FW	(Sweden) SWE	Marcus Berg
10	FW	(Portugal) POR	Rúben Ribeiro
20	FW	(United Arab Emirates) UAE	Saad Khamis
30	FW	(United Arab Emirates) UAE	Mohammed Khalfan
99	FW	(United Arab Emirates) UAE	Jamal Maroof

== Competitions ==
=== Overview ===
Competition	First match	Last match	Starting round	Final position	Record							
Competition	First match	Last match	Starting round	Final position	Pld	W	D	L	GF	GA	GD	Win %
Pro League	31 August 2018	26 May 2019	Matchday 1	4th	26	14	4	8	45	35	+10	53.85
President's Cup	7 December 2018		Round of 16	Round of 16	1	0	0	1	3	5	−2	0.00
League Cup	5 September 2018	28 December 2018	Group stage	Quarter-finals	7	4	1	2	11	5	+6	57.14
UAE Super Cup	25 August 2018		Final	Runners–up	1	0	1	0	3	3	+0	0.00
Champions League	5 March 2019	20 May 2019	Group stage	Group stage (4th)	6	0	2	4	4	10	−6	0.00
FIFA Club World Cup	12 December 2018	22 December 2018	First round	Runners–up	4	1	2	1	9	9	+0	25.00
Total					45	19	10	16	75	67	+8	42.22

Last updated: 19 December 2019
Source: Competitions

=== UAE Pro-League ===
==== League table ====
Pos	Team	Pld	W	D	L	GF	GA	GD	Pts	Qualification or relegation
2	Shabab Al Ahli	26	17	2	7	57	36	+21	53	Qualification for AFC Champions League group stage (Note: Since league runners-up, Shabab Al Ahli, were also UAE President's Cup winners, the league 3rd place qualified for the AFC Champions League group stage.)
3	Al Wahda	26	14	4	8	63	40	+23	46	Qualification for AFC Champions League group stage
4	Al Ain	26	14	4	8	45	35	+10	46	Qualification for AFC Champions League play-off round
5	Al Jazira	26	13	6	7	66	41	+25	45	Qualification for Arab Champions League
6	Baniyas	26	11	7	8	50	40	+10	40	

Source: AGLeague
Rules for classification: 1) points; 2) head-to-head points; 3) goal difference; 4) number of goals scored; 5) number of away goals scored; 6) fair play ranking 7) draw

==== Results summary ====
Overall								Home						Away					
Pld	W	D	L	GF	GA	GD	Pts	W	D	L	GF	GA	GD	W	D	L	GF	GA	GD
26	14	4	8	45	35	+10	46	8	2	3	24	15	+9	6	2	5	21	20	+1

Last updated: 19 December 2019.
Source: Competitive matches

==== Results by round ====
Round	1	2	3	4	5	6	7	8	9	10	11	12	13	14	15	16	17	18	19	20	21	22	23	24	25	26
Ground	A	H	A	H	A	H	A	H	H	A	H	A	H	H	A	H	A	H	A	H	A	A	H	A	H	A
Result	W	W	W	W	D	L	W	L	W	W	W	W	W	D	L	W	L	W	L	L	D	L	D	W	W	L
Position	4	3	3	2	2	3	2	2	2	2	2	1	2	2	2	2	2	2	3	4	4	4	5	5	3	4

Updated to match(es) played on 19 December 2019. Source: Competitive matches
A = Away; H = Home; W = Win; D = Draw; L = Loss

==== Matches ====
Win Draw Loss

31 August 2018 Round 1	Emirates	1–3	Al Ain	Ras al-Khaimah
18:50	Ibini-Isei 18'	Soccerway report	El Shahat 2'; Berg 21'; Caio 78'	Stadium: Emirates Club Stadium; Referee: Omar Mohamed Al Ali

15 September 2018 Round 2	Al Ain	2–1	Al Dhafra	Al Ain
19:35	Diaky 80', 87'	Soccerway report	Al Abri 18'	Stadium: Hazza bin Zayed Stadium; Referee: Yaqoub Al Hammadi

21 September 2018 Round 3	Al Nasr	0–3	Al Ain	Dubai
19:30		Soccerway report	Berg 15'; Shiotani 30'; Caio 74' (pen.)	Stadium: Maktoum bin Rashid Al Maktoum Stadium; Referee: Abdulrazaq Ibrahim Al Marzouqi

28 September 2018 Round 4	Al Ain	2–1	Shabab Al Ahli	Al Ain
21:00	El Shahat 41'; Abdulrahman 45+6'	Soccerway report	Luvannor 66'	Stadium: Hazza bin Zayed Stadium; Referee: Abdulla Ali Al Ajel Al Zaabi

5 October 2018 Round 5	Fujairah	2–2	Al Ain	Fujairah
21:00	Benyettou 39'; Mubarak 88'	Soccerway report	Berg 15'; Diaky 78'	Stadium: Fujairah Club Stadium; Referee: Hamad Ali Yousef

20 October 2018 Round 6	Al Ain	1–2	Al Jazira	Al Ain
20:45	Berg 33'	Soccerway report	Leonardo 85'; Yousef 90'	Stadium: Hazza bin Zayed Stadium; Referee: Ammar Ali Al Junaibi

26 October 2018 Round 7	Ajman	0–3	Al Ain	Ajman
18:00		Soccerway report	Berg 81'; El Shahat 87'; Diaky 90+4'	Stadium: Sheikh Rashid Bin Saeed Stadium; Referee: Yaqoub Al Hammadi

31 October 2018 Round 8	Al Ain	1–2	Sharjah	Al Ain
19:30	Berg 67'	Soccerway report	Welliton 25'; Coronado 61' (pen.)	Stadium: Hazza bin Zayed Stadium; Referee: Mohamed Abdulla Hassan

4 November 2018 Round 9	Al Ain	2–0	Baniyas	Al Ain
19:30	Yaslam 13'; El Shahat 75'	Soccerway report		Stadium: Hazza bin Zayed Stadium; Referee: Abdulrazaq Ibrahim Al Marzouqi

24 November 2018 Round 10	Kalba	1–2	Al Ain	Kalba
16:40	Tobar 54'	Soccerway report	Berg 41'; Shiotani 89'	Stadium: Ittihad Kalba Club Stadium; Referee: Omar Mohamed Al Ali

29 November 2018 Round 11	Al Ain	4–0	Dibba Al Fujairah	Al Ain
16:45	Berg 15', 47'; El Shahat 19'; Caio 49'	Soccerway report		Stadium: Hazza bin Zayed Stadium; Referee: Hamad Ali Yousef

3 December 2018 Round 12	Al Wasl	1–3	Al Ain	Zabeel, Dubai
19:30	Ismail Ahmed 56' (o.g.)	Soccerway report	Berg 19'; Caio 48'; El Shahat 90'	Stadium: Zabeel Stadium; Referee: Ammar Ali Al Junaibi

10 February 2019 Round 13	Al Ain	1–0	Al Wahda	Al Ain
20:00	Caio 65'	Soccerway report		Stadium: Hazza bin Zayed Stadium; Referee: Ammar Ali Al Junaibi

5 February 2019 Round 14	Al Ain	0–0	Emirates	Al Ain
20:00		Soccerway report		Stadium: Hazza bin Zayed Stadium; Referee: Abdulrazaq Ibrahim Al Marzouqi

15 February 2019 Round 15	Al Dhafra	3–0	Al Ain	Madinat Zayed
17:35	Bawazir 2'; Rômulo 85'; Yousef 90'	Soccerway report		Stadium: Al Dhafra Stadium; Referee: Hamad Ali Yousef

23 February 2019 Round 16	Al Ain	2–1	Al Nasr	Al Ain
20:15	Jamal Ibrahim 28'; Diaky 86'	Soccerway report	Negredo 26' (pen.)	Stadium: Hazza bin Zayed Stadium; Referee: Adel Al Naqbi

28 February 2019 Round 17	Shabab Al Ahli	2–0	Al Ain	Dubai
20:15	Luvannor 7'; Ahmed Khalil 84'	Soccerway report		Stadium: Rashid Stadium; Referee: Hamad Ali Yousef

30 March 2019 Round 18	Al Ain	2–1	Fujairah	Al Ain
20:30	Shiotani 14'; Rúben Ribeiro 59'	Soccerway report	Khamis 77'	Stadium: Hazza bin Zayed Stadium; Referee: Omar Mohamed Al Ali

3 April 2019 Round 19	Al Jazira	5–1	Al Ain	Abu Dhabi City
21:30	Asante 3', 48'; Mabkhout 28', 79'; Barazite 45+3'	Soccerway report	Ismail Ahmed 42'	Stadium: Mohammed bin Zayed Stadium; Referee: Mohamed Abdulla Hassan

13 April 2019 Round 20	Al Ain	0–4	Ajman	Al Ain
18:55		Soccerway report	Ohawuchi 29'; Malallah 42'; Khalid Eisa 51' (o.g.); Vander 90'	Stadium: Hazza bin Zayed Stadium; Referee: Yaqoub Al Hammadi

17 April 2019 Round 21	Sharjah	2–2	Al Ain	Sharjah City
21:30	Coronado 28'; Welliton 88'	Soccerway report	Jamal Ibrahim 35'; Shiotani 72' (pen.)	Stadium: Sharjah Stadium; Referee: Ammar Ali Al Junaibi

27 April 2019 Round 22	Baniyas	2–0	Al Ain	Al Shamkha, Abu Dhabi
19:05	Ortega 49'; Pedro Conde 65'	Soccerway report		Stadium: Baniyas Stadium; Referee: Abdulrazaq Ibrahim Al Marzouqi

1 May 2019 Round 23	Al Ain	2–2	Kalba	Al Ain
19:05	Al-Ahbabi 7'; Mohammed Khalfan 16'	Soccerway report	Sio 2', 45+1'	Stadium: Hazza bin Zayed Stadium; Referee: Abdulla Ali Al Ajel Al Zaabi

11 May 2019 Round 24	Dibba Al Fujairah	0–2	Al Ain	Fujairah
23:00		Soccerway report	Amer Abdulrahman 27'; Caio 90+5'	Stadium: Fujairah Club Stadium; Referee: Yahya Ali Hassan

15 May 2019 Round 25	Al Ain	5–1	Al Wasl	Al Ain
23:00	Rúben Ribeiro 3' (pen.); Yahya Nader 6'; Falah Waleed 19'; Caio 27'; Al-Bloushi 39'	Soccerway report	Noor 80'	Stadium: Hazza bin Zayed Stadium; Referee: Ahmed Essa Mohammed

26 May 2019 Round 26	Al Wahda	1–0	Al Ain	Al Nahyan, Abu Dhabi
23:00	Tagliabué 87'	Soccerway report		Stadium: Al Nahyan Stadium; Referee: Abdulla Hassan Mohammed

=== UAE Super Cup ===
25 August 2018	Al Ain	3–3 (a.e.t.) (3–4 p)	Al Wahda	Cairo
23:00	Berg 62'; Diaky 73' (pen.); Caio 77'	Report	Matar 4'; Batna 7'; Tagliabúe 40'	Stadium: 30 June Stadium; Referee: Abdulla Ali Al Zaabi
	Penalties
	Diaky (penalty scored); Berg (penalty scored); El Shahat (penalty missed); Caio (penalty missed); Al-Ahbabi (penalty scored)		(penalty scored) Batna; (penalty missed) Tagliabúe; (penalty scored) Chang-woo; (penalty scored) Al-Kamali; (penalty scored) Leornado

=== President's Cup ===
7 December 2018 Round of 16	Al Ain	5-3	Al Wasl	Abu Dhabi
19:30	Caio 47'; Hussein 58'; Diaky 76'	Report	Lima 21', 63'; Jassem 29'; Caio 42', 82' (pen.)	Stadium: Al Nahyan Stadium; Attendance: 25,761; Referee: Yaqoub Al Hammadi

=== League Cup ===
==== Group B ====
Team	Pld	W	D	L	GF	GA	GD	Pts
Al Nasr	6	5	0	1	14	6	+8	15
Al Ain	6	4	1	1	11	4	+7	13
Al Jazira	6	3	1	2	10	7	+3	10
Emirates	6	2	2	2	10	10	0	8
Al Dhafra	6	2	1	3	8	11	−3	7
Fujairah	6	2	1	3	13	18	−5	7
Sharjah	6	0	0	6	5	15	−10	0

Source: GSA

5 September 2018 Matchday 1	Sharjah	1–4	Al Ain	Abu Dhabi
21:30	Igor Coronado 80'	Report	Caio 10' (pen.), 35'; Tsukasa Shiotani 78'; Jamal Ibrahim 88'	Stadium: Mohammed bin Zayed Stadium; Referee: Sultan Mohamed Al Hammadi

10 September 2018 Matchday 2	Al Ain	1–2	Al Nasr	Al Ain
21:15	Caio 32'	Report	Iury 2'; Salem Saleh 84'	Stadium: Hazza bin Zayed Stadium; Referee: Hamad Ali Al Ali

10 October 2018 Matchday 3	Al Jazira	0–2	Al Ain	Abu Dhabi
18:10		Report	Caio 59'; Jamal Ibrahim 90+4'	Stadium: Mohammed bin Zayed Stadium; Referee: Sultan Abdulrazzaq Al Marzouqi

15 October 2018 Matchday 4	Al Ain	1–0	Al Dhafra	Al Ain
18:05	Caio 27'	Report		Stadium: Tahnoun bin Mohammed Stadium; Referee: Ahmed Eisa Mohamed

12 November 2018 Matchday 5	Fujairah	1–3	Al Ain	Fujairah
17:45	Ahmad Moosa 86'	Report	Caio 24' (pen.), 77'; Jamal Ibrahim 60'	Stadium: Fujairah Club Stadium; Referee: Yahya Ali Al Mulla

18 November 2018 Matchday 6	Al Ain	0–0	Sharjah	Al Ain
17:45		Report		Stadium: Tahnoun bin Mohamed Stadium; Referee: Khalid Abdulla Bu Hasan

==== Knockout stage ====
28 December 2018 Quarter-finals	Al Ain	0–1	Baniyas Club	Al Ain
17:55		Report	Haboush Saleh 68'	Stadium: Tahnoun bin Mohamed Stadium; Referee: Mohammed Abdulla Hassan

=== FIFA Club World Cup ===
In the first round on 12 December, Al-Ain defeated Team Wellington in a penalty shoot-out following a 3–3 draw at their home stadium, Hazza bin Zayed Stadium. Wellington, a semi-professional club that qualified as the OFC Champions League champion, entered halftime with a 3–1 lead that was cut back by an equalising volley from Marcus Berg. The match remained scoreless after extra time and advanced to a penalty shoot-out, which Al-Ain won 4–3 after five rounds after goalkeeper Khalid Eisa made two saves.

Al-Ain advanced to face African champions Espérance de Tunis in the second round match, held three days later at Hazza bin Zayed Stadium. The team defeated Espérance 3–0 in an upset that began with two goals scored in the opening 16 minutes. Al-Ain produced a larger upset in the semi-finals, defeating Copa Libertadores champions River Plate in a penalty shoot-out to advance to the Club World Cup final. The match began with two early goals for River Plate scored by Rafael Santos Borré following an opening strike from Berg; after an equalising goal was disallowed by the video assistant referee, Caio Lucas Fernandes scored for Al-Ain in the 51st minute to draw the teams level at 2–2. After a scoreless extra time, aided by goalkeeper Essa's saves, Al-Ain defeated River Plate 5–4 in a penalty shoot-out, its second of the competition, with Essa making one save on River's Enzo Pérez. The semi-final upset of River was called the "greatest achievement" in Emirati football history by Al-Ain manager Zoran Mamić.

12 December 2018 First round	Al-Ain (United Arab Emirates)	3–3 (a.e.t.) (4–3 p)	(New Zealand) Team Wellington	Al Ain
19:30	Shiotani 45'; Doumbia 49'; Berg 85'	Report	Barcia 11'; Clapham 15'; Ilich 44'	Stadium: Hazza bin Zayed Stadium; Attendance: 15,279; Referee: Ryuji Sato (Japan)
	Penalties
	Diaky (penalty scored); Berg (penalty missed); El Shahat (penalty scored); Shiotani (penalty scored); Caio (penalty scored)		(penalty scored) Allen; (penalty missed) Kilkolly; (penalty scored) Ilich; (penalty scored) Watson; (penalty missed) Gulley

15 December 2018 Second round	Espérance de Tunis (Tunisia)	0–3	(United Arab Emirates) Al-Ain	Al Ain
20:30		Report	Ahmed 2'; El Shahat 16'; Al-Ahbabi 60'	Stadium: Hazza bin Zayed Stadium; Attendance: 21,333; Referee: Jair Marrufo (United States)

18 December 2018 Semi-finals	River Plate (Argentina)	2–2 (a.e.t.) (4–5 p)	(United Arab Emirates) Al-Ain	Al Ain
20:30	Borré 11', 16'	Report	Berg 3'; Caio 51'	Stadium: Hazza bin Zayed Stadium; Attendance: 21,383; Referee: Gianluca Rocchi (Italy)
	Penalties
	Scocco (penalty scored); Quintero (penalty scored); Pratto (penalty scored); Borré (penalty scored); Pérez (penalty missed)		(penalty scored) Caio; (penalty scored) Shiotani; (penalty scored) Al-Ahbabi; (penalty scored) Abdulrahman; (penalty scored) Yaslam

22 December 2018 Final	Real Madrid (Spain)	4–1	(United Arab Emirates) Al-Ain	Abu Dhabi
20:30	Modrić 14'; Llorente 60'; Ramos 79'; Nader 90+1' (o.g.)	Report	Shiotani 86'	Stadium: Zayed Sports City Stadium; Attendance: 40,696; Referee: Jair Marrufo (United States)

=== AFC Champions League ===
==== Group stage ====
===== Group C =====
Pos	Team	Pld	W	D	L	GF	GA	GD	Pts	Qualification	HIL	DUH	EST	AIN
1	(Saudi Arabia) Al-Hilal	6	4	1	1	10	5	+5	13	Advance to knockout stage	—	3–1	1–0	2–0
2	(Qatar) Al-Duhail	6	2	3	1	11	8	+3	9	Advance to knockout stage	2–2	—	3–0	2–2
3	(Iran) Esteghlal	6	2	2	2	6	8	−2	8		2–1	1–1	—	1–1
4	(United Arab Emirates) Al-Ain	6	0	2	4	4	10	−6	2		0–1	0–2	1–2	—

Source: AFC
Rules for classification: Group stage tiebreakers

5 March 2019 1	Al-Ain (United Arab Emirates)	0–1	(Saudi Arabia) Al-Hilal	Al Ain
19:20 UTC+4		Live Report; Stats Report	Al-Shalhoub 65'	Stadium: Hazza bin Zayed Stadium, Attendance: 9,726; Referee: Nawaf Shukralla (Bahrain)

12 March 2019 2	Esteghlal (Iran)	1–1	(United Arab Emirates) Al-Ain	Tehran
19:00 UTC+3:30	Bagheri 53'	Live Report; Stats Report	Shiotani 85'	Stadium: Azadi Stadium; Attendance: 65,178; Referee: Ahmed Al-Kaf (Oman)

8 April 2019 3	Al-Duhail (Qatar)	2–2	(United Arab Emirates) Al-Ain	Doha
18:30 UTC+3	Boudiaf 9'; El-Arabi 32'	Live Report; Stats Report	Maroof 36'; Berg 58'	Stadium: Abdullah bin Khalifa Stadium; Attendance: 6,300; Referee: Ma Ning (China)

23 April 2019 4	Al-Ain (United Arab Emirates)	0–2	(Qatar) Al-Duhail	Al Ain
20:00 UTC+4		Live Report; Stats Report	Ali 3'; El-Arabi 66'	Stadium: Hazza bin Zayed Stadium; Attendance: 6,126; Referee: Muhammad Taqi (Singapore)

6 May 2019 5	Al-Hilal (Saudi Arabia)	2–0	(United Arab Emirates) Al-Ain	Riyadh
22:00 UTC+3	Bahebri 1'; Al-Shalhoub 90'	Live Report; Stats Report		Stadium: King Saud University Stadium; Attendance: 12,105; Referee: Valentin Kovalenko (Uzbekistan)

20 May 2019 6	Al-Ain (United Arab Emirates)	1–2	(Iran) Esteghlal	Al Ain
22:00 UTC+4	Berg 13'	Live Report; Stats Report	Daneshgar 22'; Tabrizi 45+1'	Stadium: Hazza bin Zayed Stadium; Attendance: 1,126; Referee: Ko Hyung-jin (South Korea)

== Statistics ==
=== Squad appearances and goals ===
No.	Pos	Nat	Player	Total		Pro-League		President's Cup		League Cup		Champions League		Other (Note: Includes the UAE Super Cup and FIFA Club World Cup)	
No.	Pos	Nat	Player	Apps	Goals	Apps	Goals	Apps	Goals	Apps	Goals	Apps	Goals	Apps	Goals
Goalkeepers
1	GK	(United Arab Emirates) UAE	Mohammed Abo Sandah	3	0	3	0	0	0	0	0	0	0	0	0
12	GK	(United Arab Emirates) UAE	Hamad Al-Mansouri	7	0	0	0	0	0	7	0	0	0	0	0
17	GK	(United Arab Emirates) UAE	Khalid Eisa	34	0	23	0	0	0	0	0	6	0	5	0
Defenders
2	DF	(United Arab Emirates) UAE	Ali Al Haidhani	7	0	4	0	0	0	3	0	0	0	0	0
3	DF	(Mali) MLI	Tongo Doumbia	10	1	0	0	0	0	0	0	6	0	4	1
4	DF	(United Arab Emirates) UAE	Saeed Musabbeh	11	0	6	0	0	0	4	0	1	0	0	0
5	DF	(United Arab Emirates) UAE	Ismail Ahmed	26	1	17	1	0	0	0	0	4	0	5	0
14	DF	(United Arab Emirates) UAE	Mohammed Fayez	18	0	7	0	0	0	5	0	3	0	3	0
15	DF	(United Arab Emirates) UAE	Khaled Abdulrahman	8	0	5	0	0	0	0	0	3	0	0	0
19	DF	(United Arab Emirates) UAE	Mohanad Salem	27	0	16	0	0	0	3	0	6	0	2	0
23	DF	(United Arab Emirates) UAE	Mohamed Ahmed	14	1	8	0	0	0	1	0	0	0	5	1
33	DF	(Japan) JPN	Tsukasa Shiotani	42	6	26	4	0	0	6	1	5	1	5	0
44	DF	(United Arab Emirates) UAE	Saeed Juma	20	0	11	0	0	0	5	0	4	0	0	0
45	DF	(United Arab Emirates) UAE	Abdulrahman Almahri	1	0	0	0	0	0	1	0	0	0	0	0
50	DF	(Egypt) EGY	Ahmed Jamal	3	0	2	0	0	0	1	0	0	0	0	0
56	DF	(United Arab Emirates) UAE	Salem Abdullah	4	0	1	0	0	0	3	0	0	0	0	0
62	DF	(United Arab Emirates) UAE	Khalid Al Bloushi	1	0	1	0	0	0	0	0	0	0	0	0
Midfielders
6	MF	(United Arab Emirates) UAE	Amer Abdulrahman	27	1	18	1	0	0	0	0	5	0	4	0
7	MF	(Brazil) BRA	Caio	36	16	22	7	0	0	6	7	3	0	5	2
8	MF	(United Arab Emirates) UAE	Hazem Fayez	3	0	0	0	0	0	3	0	0	0	0	0
11	MF	(United Arab Emirates) UAE	Bandar Al-Ahbabi	32	2	21	1	0	0	0	0	6	0	5	1
13	MF	(United Arab Emirates) UAE	Ahmed Barman	26	0	18	0	0	0	0	0	4	0	4	0
16	MF	(United Arab Emirates) UAE	Mohamed Abdulrahman	22	1	15	1	0	0	2	0	1	0	4	0
18	MF	(Ivory Coast) CIV	Ibrahim Diaky	15	6	11	5	0	0	1	0	1	0	2	1
28	MF	(United Arab Emirates) UAE	Sulaiman Nasser	5	0	0	0	0	0	5	0	0	0	0	0
29	MF	(Egypt) EGY	Mohamed Fathy	6	0	0	0	0	0	6	0	0	0	0	0
43	MF	(United Arab Emirates) UAE	Rayan Yaslam	26	1	17	1	0	0	1	0	3	0	5	0
51	MF	(United Arab Emirates) UAE	Khalid Al-Bloushi	9	1	6	1	0	0	1	0	2	0	0	0
58	MF	(United Arab Emirates) UAE	Falah Waleed	12	1	4	1	0	0	6	0	2	0	0	0
88	MF	(Egypt) EGY	Yahia Nader	22	1	14	1	0	0	5	0	0	0	3	0
Forwards
9	FW	(Sweden) SWE	Marcus Berg	32	15	20	10	0	0	1	0	6	2	5	3
10	FW	(Portugal) POR	Rúben Ribeiro	12	2	12	2	0	0	0	0	0	0	0	0
20	FW	(United Arab Emirates) UAE	Saad Khamis	9	0	2	0	0	0	6	0	1	0	0	0
30	FW	(United Arab Emirates) UAE	Mohammed Khalvan	26	1	15	1	0	0	6	0	5	0	0	0
99	FW	(United Arab Emirates) UAE	Jamal Maroof	32	6	20	2	0	0	7	3	4	1	1	0
Players transferred out during the season
74	MF	(Egypt) EGY	Hussein El Shahat	18	7	12	6	0	0	1	0	0	0	5	1

Last updated: 8 June 2019
Source: fr.soccerway.com

=== Goalscorers ===
Includes all competitive matches. The list is sorted alphabetically by surname when total goals are equal.

No.	Nat.	Player	Pos.	PL	PC	SC	LC	CL 1	CWC	TOTAL
7	(Brazil)	Caio	MF	7	1	1	7	0	1	17
9	(Sweden)	Marcus Berg	FW	10	0	1	0	2	2	15
74	(Egypt)	Hussein El Shahat	MF	6	1	0	0	0	1	8
33	(Japan)	Tsukasa Shiotani	DF	4	0	0	1	1	2	8
18	(Ivory Coast)	Ibrahim Diaky	MF	5	1	1	0	0	0	7
99	(United Arab Emirates)	Jamal Maroof	FW	2	0	0	3	1	0	6
10	(Portugal)	Rúben Ribeiro	FW	2	0	0	0	0	0	2
11	(United Arab Emirates)	Bandar Al-Ahbabi	MF	1	0	0	0	0	1	2
30	(United Arab Emirates)	Mohammed Khalvan	FW	1	0	0	0	0	0	1
88	(Egypt)	Yahya Nader	MF	1	0	0	0	0	0	1
58	(United Arab Emirates)	Falah Waleed	MF	1	0	0	0	0	0	1
51	(United Arab Emirates)	Khalid Al-Bloushi	MF	1	0	0	0	0	0	1
43	(United Arab Emirates)	Rayan Yaslam	MF	1	0	0	0	0	0	1
16	(United Arab Emirates)	Mohamed Abdulrahman	MF	1	0	0	0	0	0	1
6	(United Arab Emirates)	Amer Abdulrahman	MF	1	0	0	0	0	0	1
5	(United Arab Emirates)	Ismail Ahmed	DF	1	0	0	0	0	0	1
3	(Mali)	Tongo Doumbia	DF	0	0	0	0	0	1	1
23	(United Arab Emirates)	Mohamed Ahmed	DF	0	0	0	0	0	1	1
Own Goals				0	0	0	0	0	0	0
Totals				45	3	3	11	4	9	75

=== Clean sheets ===
Includes all competitive matches.

No.	Nat	Name	PL	PC	SC	LC	CL 1	CWC	Total
1	(United Arab Emirates)	Mohammed Abo Sandah	1	0	0	0	0	0	1
12	(United Arab Emirates)	Hamad Abdulla Nasser	0	0	0	3	0	0	3
17	(United Arab Emirates)	Khalid Eisa	6	0	0	0	0	1	7
		TOTALS	7	0	0	3	0	1	11
