= Adham Khalid =

Egyptian footballer (born 2002)

Adham Khalid أدهم خالد
Personal information
- Full name: Adham Khalid Ali Abdelhameed
- Date of birth: 14 January 2002 (age 24)
- Place of birth: United Arab Emirates
- Height: 1.81 m (5 ft 11 in)
- Positions: Left-back; centre-back

Team information
- Current team: Al Orooba (on loan from Baniyas)
- Number: 74

Youth career
- 2016–2018: HPC
- 2020: Al Jazira U19

Senior career*
Years	Team	Apps	(Gls)
2022–2024	Al Ain	0	(0)
2024–	Baniyas	14	(0)
2025–	→ Al Orooba (loan)	0	(0)
- * Club domestic league appearances and goals as of 4 January 2022

Adham Khalid Ali Abdelhameed (Arabic: أدهم خالد علي عبدالحميد; born 14 January 2002), is an Egyptian professional footballer who plays as a left back for Al Orooba, on loan from Baniyas.

== Early life ==
Adham Khalid is an Egyptian player born in the United Arab Emirates.

== Club career ==
=== Al Jazira ===
In February 2020, Adham joined Al Jazira, and played for U19, U21.

=== Al Ain ===
In August 2021, Adham joined Al Ain. His official debut with the first team was against Al Wasl on 4 January 2022 in League Cup.

== Career statistics ==
=== Club ===
As of 4 January 2022.

Club	Season	League			League Cup		President's Cup		Continental		Other		Total	
Club	Season	Division	Apps	Goals	Apps	Goals	Apps	Goals	Apps	Goals	Apps	Goals	Apps	Goals
Al Jazira U21	2019–20	UAE Pro League U21	3	0	—								3	0
Al Jazira U21	2020–21	UAE Pro League U21	9	0	—								9	0
Al Ain U21	2021–22	UAE Pro League U21	10	3	—								10	3
Al Ain	2021–22	UAE Pro League	0	0	1	0	0	0	—				1	0
Career total			22	3	1	0	0	0	0	0	0	0	23	3
