= Mohamed Awad Alla =

Emirati footballer

Personal information
- Full name: Mohamed Awad Alla Hassan Ibrahim
- Date of birth: 16 July 2002 (age 24)
- Place of birth: Ajman, United Arab Emirates
- Height: 1.79 m (5 ft 10 in)
- Position: Winger

Team information
- Current team: Al Ain
- Number: 7

Senior career*
Years	Team	Apps	(Gls)
2020–	Al Ain	20	(5)
2023–2024	→ Khor Fakkan (loan)	23	(3)
2025–2026	→ Lechia Gdańsk (loan)	8	(1)
2026–	→ Baniyas (loan)	0	(0)

International career^{‡}
2025–	United Arab Emirates	1	(0)
- * Club domestic league appearances and goals as of 16 March 2026 ‡ National team caps and goals as of 18:48, 8 September 2025 (UTC)

Mohamed Awad Alla Hassan Ibrahim (Arabic: محمد عوض الله حسن ابراهيم; born 16 July 2002) is an Emirati professional footballer who plays as a winger for UAE Pro League club Al Ain and the United Arab Emirates national team.

== Career statistics ==
As of match played 2 December 2025

Appearances and goals by club, season and competition
Club	Season	League			National cup (Note: Includes UAE President's Cup, Polish Cup)		Continental		Other		Total	
Club	Season	Division	Apps	Goals	Apps	Goals	Apps	Goals	Apps	Goals	Apps	Goals
Al Ain	2020–21	UAE Pro League	1	0	0	0	0	0	1 (Note: Appearance(s) in UAE League Cup)	0	2	0
Al Ain	2021–22	UAE Pro League	0	0	0	0	0	0	0	0	0	0
Al Ain	2022–23	UAE Pro League	0	0	0	0	0	0	0	0	0	0
Al Ain	2024–25	UAE Pro League	13	5	2	0	3 (Note: Appearances in AFC Champions League Elite)	0	2	1	20	6
Al Ain	Total		14	5	2	0	3	0	3	1	22	6
Khor Fakkan (loan)	2022–23	UAE Pro League	23	3	1	0	—		2	0	26	3
Lechia Gdańsk (loan)	2025–26	Ekstraklasa	8	1	3	0	—		—		11	1
Career total			45	9	6	0	3	0	5	1	59	10

=== International ===
As of match played 8 September 2025

Appearances and goals by national team and year
National team	Year	Apps	Goals
United Arab Emirates
United Arab Emirates	2025	1	0
Total		1	0

== Personal life ==
Awad Alla was born in Ajman, United Arab Emirates to a Sudanese father and a Somali mother.
