= Erik (footballer, born 2001) =

Emirati footballer (born 2001)

Personal information
- Full name: Erik Jorgens de Menezes
- Date of birth: 18 February 2001 (age 25)
- Place of birth: Quaraí, Brazil
- Height: 1.73 m (5 ft 8 in)
- Position: Left-back

Team information
- Current team: Al Ain
- Number: 15

Youth career
- Internacional

Senior career*
Years	Team	Apps	(Gls)
2019–2020	Internacional	2	(0)
2020–	Al Ain	129	(5)

International career^{‡}
2025–	United Arab Emirates	4	(0)
- * Club domestic league appearances and goals as of 16 March 2026 ‡ National team caps and goals as of 17 November 2026

Erik Jorgens de Menezes (Arabic: إريك يورغينس دي مينيزيس; born 18 February 2001), simply known as Erik, is a professional footballer who plays as left-back for UAE Pro League club Al Ain. Born in Brazil, he plays for the United Arab Emirates national team.

== Early life and career ==
A product of SC Internacional youth system, the left-back did not receive many opportunities in the main team. He only played two games in the professional team. In the 2020/21 season, still at 19 years old, the youngster transferred to Al Ain FC, where he became a regular starter.

== International career ==
Erik is a Brazilian citizen who was granted an Emirati passport in September 2023, making him eligible to represent the United Arab Emirates national team through residency. He made his debut for the UAE in September 2025, starting in a friendly match against Syria. His first official appearance came in October 2025 during the 2026 FIFA World Cup qualifiers against Qatar, when he entered the match as a substitute in the 68th minute, permanently committing him to the UAE national team and making him ineligible to represent Brazil in the future.

== Club Career Stats ==
As of match played 25 August 2024

Appearances and goals by club, season and competition
Club	Season	League			National cup		Continental		Other		Total	
Club	Season	Division	Apps	Goals	Apps	Goals	Apps	Goals	Apps	Goals	Apps	Goals
Internacional	2019	Série A	2	0	—		0	0	0	0	2	0
Al Ain	2020–21	UPL	23	0	1	0	1	0	2	0	26	0
Al Ain	2021–22	UPL	23	1	2	0	0	0	6	0	31	1
Al Ain	2022–23	UPL	25	3	6	2	0	0	6	0	37	5
Al Ain	2023–24	UPL	21	1	0	0	8	2	5	0	34	3
Al Ain	2024–25	UPL	0	0	0	0	0	0	0	0	0	0
Al Ain	Total		92	5	9	2	9	2	19	0	129	9
Career total			94	5	9	2	9	2	19	0	131	9

== Honours ==
Al Ain

- AFC Champions League: 2023-24
- UAE Pro League: 2021–22
- UAE League Cup: 2021–22

Individual

- UAE Pro League Golden Boy Best Young Resident player of the Year: 2021–22, 2022–23
