= Kouame Autonne =

Footballer (born 2000)

Autonne Kouame
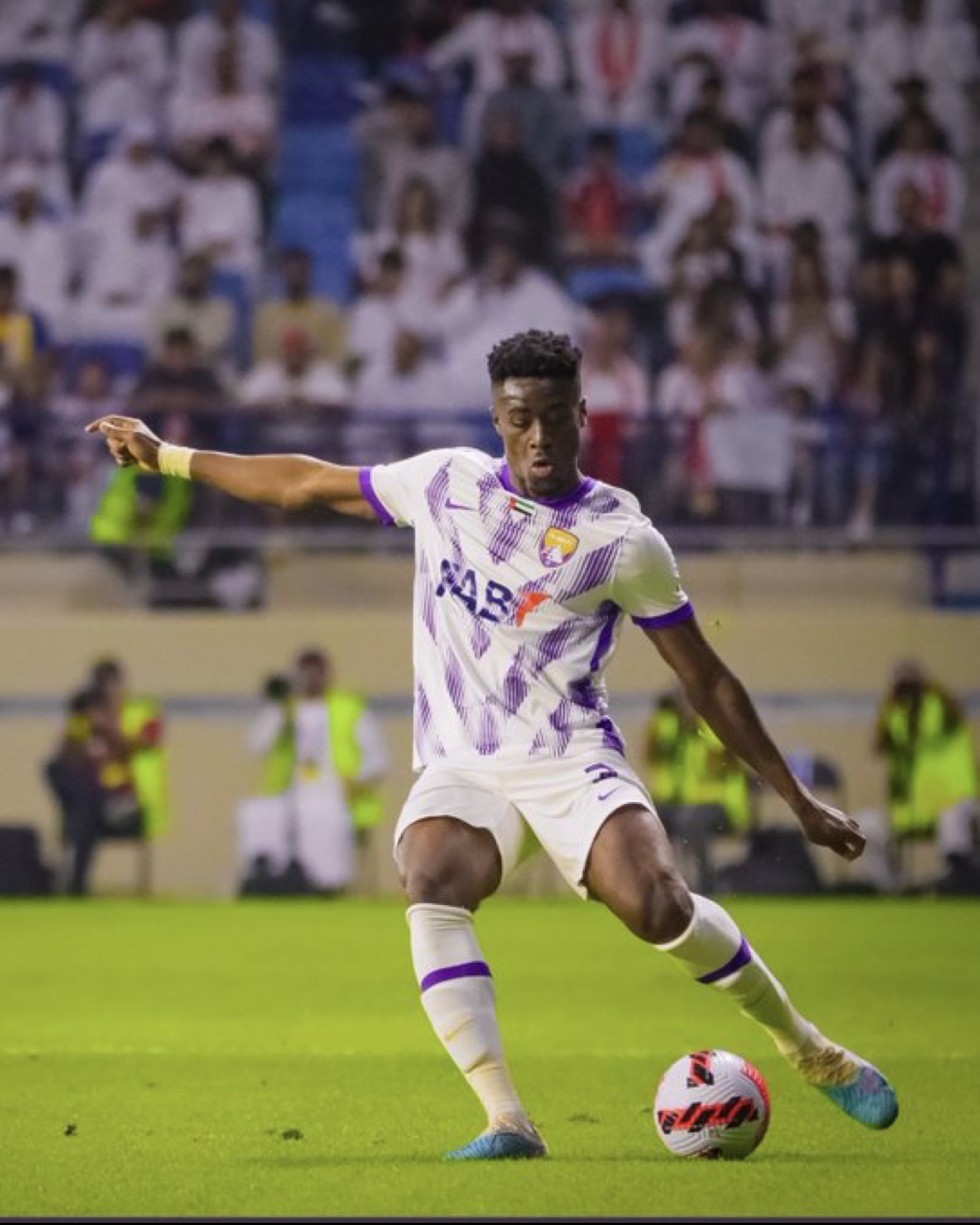

Personal information
- Full name: Kouame Autonne Kouadio Kouame
- Date of birth: 22 September 2000 (age 26)
- Place of birth: Ouragahio, Ivory Coast
- Height: 1.87 m (6 ft 2 in)
- Position: Center-back

Team information
- Current team: Al Ain

Youth career
- –2019: ASEC Mimosas

Senior career*
Years	Team	Apps	(Gls)
2019–2021	Khor Fakkan	31	(1)
2021–	Al Ain	90	(9)
2026–	→ United (loan)	0	(0)

International career^{‡}
2024–	United Arab Emirates	18	(0)
- * Club domestic league appearances and goals as of 14 July 2026 ‡ National team caps and goals as of 17 November 2026

Kouame Autonne Kouadio Kouame (born 22 September 2000) is professional footballer who plays as a center-back for UAE Pro League club Al Ain. Born in Ivory Coast, he represents the United Arab Emirates national team.

== Career statistics ==
=== Club ===
As of match played 26 May 2024

Club	Season	League			President's Cup		League Cup		Continental		Other		Total	
Club	Season	Division	Apps	Goals	Apps	Goals	Apps	Goals	Apps	Goals	Apps	Goals	Apps	Goals
Khor Fakkan	2019–20	UAE Pro League	15	1	1	0	3	0	—		—		19	1
Khor Fakkan	2020–21	UAE Pro League	16	0	1	0	4	1	—		—		21	1
Khor Fakkan	Total		31	2	2	0	7	1	—		—		40	2
Al Ain	2021–22	UAE Pro League	19	3	0	0	4	1	—		—		23	4
Al Ain	2022–23	UAE Pro League	25	1	6	0	5	1	—		1 (Note: Appearance in UAE Super Cup)	0	37	2
Al Ain	2023–24	UAE Pro League	17	2	2	0	6	1	13 (Note: Appearances in AFC Champions League)	2	—		38	5
Al Ain	Total		61	6	8	0	15	3	13	2	1	0	98	11
Career total			92	7	10	0	22	4	13	2	1	0	139	13

== Honours ==
Al Ain

- UAE Pro League: 2021–22
- UAE League Cup: 2021–22
- AFC Champions League: 2023–24
