= Nasser Mahmoud Noor =

Comoran association football player (born 1996)

Nasser Mahmoud
Personal information
- Full name: Nasser Mahmoud Noor
- Date of birth: 22 August 1996 (age 30)
- Place of birth: United Arab Emirates
- Height: 1.72 m (5 ft 8 in)
- Position: Midfielder

Senior career*
Years	Team	Apps	(Gls)
2018–2022	Al-Wasl	33	(5)
2022–2023	Ajman	5	(0)
- * Club domestic league appearances and goals as of 18:02, 26 October 2019 (UTC)

Nasser Mahmoud Noor (born 22 August 1996) is an Emirati footballer who plays as a midfielder.

== Personal life ==
Although born in the United Arab Emirates, he is not an Emirati citizen because of his bidoon condition and has received a Comorian passport instead, despite having no family connections to the East African nation. He is not eligible to play for the Comoros national team, according FIFA eligibility rules.

== Career statistics ==
=== Club ===
As of 26 October 2019.

Club	Season	League			Cup		Continental		Other		Total	
Club	Season	Division	Apps	Goals	Apps	Goals	Apps	Goals	Apps	Goals	Apps	Goals
Al-Wasl	2018–19	UAE Pro League	5	2	2 (Note: Appearances in the UAE League Cup)	0	0	0	0	0	7	2
Al-Wasl	2019–20	UAE Pro League	1	0	1	0	0	0	0	0	2	0
Career total			6	2	3	0	0	0	0	0	9	2
