= Waleed Siraj =

Sudanese professional footballer

Personal information
- Full name: Waleed Badreldin Ahmed Siraj
- Date of birth: 10 July 1992 (age 34)
- Place of birth: United Arab Emirates
- Height: 1.83 m (6 ft 0 in)
- Position: Defender

Team information
- Current team: Al-Ittifaq
- Number: 5

Senior career*
Years	Team	Apps	(Gls)
–2018	A-Merrikh		
2018–2019	Ittihad Kalba	6	(0)
2019–2021	Al-Ain	0	(0)
2019–2020	→ Hatta (loan)	18	(0)
2020–2021	→ Khor Fakkan (loan)	7	(0)
2021–2023	Hatta		
2025–	Al-Ittifaq		
- * Club domestic league appearances and goals

Waleed Siraj (born 27 October 1992) is a Sudanese professional footballer who plays as a defender for Al-Ittifaq and the Sudan national football team.
