= UAE Youth League =

The UAE Youth League is a youth league system that is organised by either the UAE Pro League Committee or UAE FA. The system was introduced in 2012 with its first season being held in 2012/13, the intention was to develop professional football at a youth level in the country. While originally only organising an under-21 competition, in the following year, the UAE FA created an under 19 league to expand its youth development.

== U21 League ==
UAE Reserve League
- Number of clubs: 14
- Current champions: Kalba (1st title)
- Most championships: Al Ain (4 titles)

=== List of Champions ===
Season	Champions
2012–13	Al Ain
2013–14	Al Ain
2014–15	Al Ain
2015–16	Sharjah
2016–17	Al Wahda
2017–18	Al Nasr
2018–19	Al Ain
2019–20	Cancelled
2020–21	Shabab Al Ahli
2021–22	Shabab Al Ahli
2022–23	Shabab Al Ahli
2023–24	Kalba

=== Performances by clubs ===
Club	Winners	Winning seasons
Al Ain	4	2012–13, 2013–14, 2014–15, 2018–19
Shabab Al Ahli	3	2020–21, 2021–22, 2022–23
Sharjah	1	2015–16
Al Wahda	1	2016–17
Al Nasr	1	2017–18
Kalba	1	2023–24

== U19 League ==
UAE Under-19 League
- Number of clubs: 18
- Current champions: Shabab Al Ahli (1st title)
- Most championships: Al Ain (3 titles)

=== List of Champions ===
Season	Champions
2013–14	Al Ain
2014–15	Al Wahda
2015–16	Al Ain
2016–17	Al Ain
2017–18	Baniyas
2018–19	Al Hamriyah
2019–20	Cancelled
2020–21	Emirates
2021–22	Al Wasl
2022–23	Al Arabi
2023–24	Shabab Al Ahli

=== Performances by clubs ===
Club	Winners	Winning seasons
Al Ain	3	2013–14, 2015–16, 2016–17
Al Wahda	1	2014–15
Baniyas	1	2017–18
Al Hamriyah	1	2018–19
Emirates	1	2020–21
Al Wasl	1	2021–22
Al Arabi	1	2022–23
Shabab Al Ahli	1	2023–24
