= Saeed Ahmed Abdulla =

Emirati footballer (born 1994)

Personal information
- Full name: Saeed Ahmed Abdulla Mohammad Al-Bloushi
- Date of birth: 17 January 1994 (age 32)
- Place of birth: United Arab Emirates
- Height: 1.70 m (5 ft 7 in)
- Positions: Winger; left back

Team information
- Current team: Khor Fakkan
- Number: 23

Youth career
- Al Ahli

Senior career*
| Years | Team | Apps | (Gls) |
| 2014–2021 | Shabab Al-Ahli | 44 | (1) |
| 2021–2023 | Al Ain | 17 | (0) |
| 2023– | Khor Fakkan | 0 | (0) |
- * Club domestic league appearances and goals as of 30 December 2021

Saeed Ahmed Abdulla Mohammad Al-Bloushi (Arabic:سعيد أحمد عبد الله محمد البلوشي; born 17 January 1994) is an Emirati footballer who plays as a winger or left back for Khor Fakkan.
