= Ali Al-Balooshi =

Emirati footballer (born 2000)

Personal information
- Full name: Ali Saeed Al-Balooshi
- Date of birth: 27 November 2000 (age 25)
- Place of birth: Emirates
- Height: 1.73 m (5 ft 8 in)
- Position: Midfielder

Youth career
- –2020: Al Ain

Senior career*
Years	Team	Apps	(Gls)
2020–2022	Al Ain	15	(0)
2022–2023	Al Bataeh	3	(0)
2023–2024	Al Urooba		
- * Club domestic league appearances and goals as of 30 December 2021

Ali Saeed Al-Balooshi (Arabic: علي سعيد البلوشي; born 27 November 2000), is an Emirati professional footballer who plays as a midfielder.

== Career statistics ==
=== Club ===
As of 11 October 2020.

Club	Season	League			Cup		Continental		Other		Total	
Club	Season	Division	Apps	Goals	Apps	Goals	Apps	Goals	Apps	Goals	Apps	Goals
Al Ain	2019–20	UAE Pro League	0	0	0	0	1	0	0	0	1	0
Career total			0	0	0	0	1	0	0	0	1	0
