= Mohammed Jamal (footballer, born 1994) =

Emirati footballer

Personal information
- Date of birth: 11 May 1994 (age 32)
- Place of birth: Abu Dhabi
- Height: 1.73 m (5 ft 8 in)
- Position: Midfielder

Youth career
- Al Jazira

Senior career*
Years	Team	Apps	(Gls)
2015–2019	Al Jazira	59	(0)
2019–2022	Al-Ain	1	(0)
2021	→ Al Jazira (loan)	6	(0)
2022	→ Al Jazira (loan)	8	(0)
2022–2023	Al Jazira	6	(0)
2023–2024	Al-Nasr	5	(0)
- * Club domestic league appearances and goals as of 30 December 2021

Mohammed Jamal (Mohamed Jamal Nasser Mubarak Badhafari)(Arabic:محمد جمال) (born 11 May 1994) is an Emirati footballer who plays as a midfielder.
