= Ahmed Jamal (footballer) =

Egyptian footballer (born 2000)

Ahmed Gamal
Personal information
- Full name: Ahmed Gamal Ali Elsayed Eldeghidi
- Date of birth: 23 January 2000 (age 26)
- Height: 1.74 m (5 ft 9 in)
- Position: Defender

Youth career
- Al Ain

Senior career*
| Years | Team | Apps | (Gls) |
| 2019–2022 | Al Ain | 5 | (0) |
| 2022 | Hatta | | |
- * Club domestic league appearances and goals as of 30 December 2021

Ahmed Gamal (Arabic: احمد جمال على السيد الدغيدى [ˈæħmæd ɡæˈmæːl ˈʕæli (e)sˈsæj.jed ed.deˈɣeːdi]; born 23 January 2000) is an Egyptian footballer who plays as a defender.

== Career statistics ==
=== Club ===
As of 1 February 2020.

| Club | Season | League | | | Cup | | Continental | | Other | | Total | |
| Club | Season | Division | Apps | Goals | Apps | Goals | Apps | Goals | Apps | Goals | Apps | Goals |
|---|---|---|---|---|---|---|---|---|---|---|---|---|
| Al Ain | 2018–19 | UAE Pro League | 2 | 0 | 0 | 0 | 0 | 0 | 0 | 0 | 2 | 0 |
| Al Ain | 2019–20 | UAE Pro League | 0 | 0 | 0 | 0 | 0 | 0 | 0 | 0 | 0 | 0 |
| Career total | | | 2 | 0 | 0 | 0 | 0 | 0 | 0 | 0 | 2 | 0 |
