= Sultan Al-Mantheri =

Emirati footballer (born 1995)

Sultan Al-Mantheri سلطان المنذري
Personal information
- Full name: Sultan Abdullah Saeed Al-Mantheri
- Date of birth: 5 January 1995 (age 31)
- Place of birth: Emirates
- Height: 1.92 m (6 ft 4 in)
- Position: Goalkeeper

Team information
- Current team: Kalba
- Number: 33

Youth career
- 2009–2014: Al-Jazira

Senior career*
Years	Team	Apps	(Gls)
2014–2016	Al-Jazira	0	(0)
2015–2016	→ Dibba Al-Fujairah (loan)	0	(0)
2016–2021	Al-Wasl	31	(0)
2021–2024	Al Ain	2	(0)
2024–	Kalba	0	(0)

International career
2015–2018	Under 23 UAE		
2017–	UAE	0	(0)
- * Club domestic league appearances and goals

Sultan Al-Mantheri (Arabic:سلطان المنذري) (born 5 January 1995) is an Emirati footballer. He currently plays as a goalkeeper for Kalba.

== Career ==
=== Al-Jazira ===
Al-Mantheri started his career at Al-Jazira and is a product of the Al-Jazira's youth system.

=== Dibba Al-Fujairah ===
On 18 July 2015, Al-Mantheri left Al-Jazira and signed with Dibba Al-Fujairah on loan of season.

=== Al-Wasl ===
On 15 July 2016, he left Al-Jazira Permanently and signed with Al-Wasl. On 16 September 2017, Al-Mantheri made his professional debut for Al-Wasl against Al Ain in the Pro League, replacing Yousif Al-Zaabi.

== Honours ==
Al Ain

- AFC Champions League: 2023-24
