= Ali Eid (footballer, born 1998) =

Emirati footballer

Ali Eid علي عيد
Personal information
- Full name: Ali Eid Ghumail Al-Yahyaei
- Date of birth: 1 March 1998 (age 28)
- Place of birth: United Arab Emirates
- Height: 1.85 m (6 ft 1 in)
- Position: Forward

Team information
- Current team: Majd
- Number: 10

Youth career
- 2010–2017: Al Ain
- 2018–2019: → Dinamo Zagreb Academy (loan)

Senior career*
Years	Team	Apps	(Gls)
2017–2022	Al Ain	5	(0)
2020–2021	→ Fujairah (loan)	20	(2)
2022–2023	Al Dhafra	16	(3)
2023–2024	Hatta	14	(3)
2024–2025	Al Urooba	8	(1)
2025–	Majd	0	(0)

International career
2020	Under 23 United Arab Emirates	1	(0)
- * Club domestic league appearances and goals as of 30 December 2021

Ali Eid (Arabic:علي عيد) (born 1 March 1998) is an Emirati footballer who plays for Majd as a forward.

== Career ==
=== Al-Ain ===
Ali Eid started his career at Al Ain and is a product of the Al-Ain's youth system. On 10 January 2017, Ali Eid made his professional debut for Al-Ain against Hatta in the Pro League, replacing Saeed Al-Kathiri.

=== Dinamo Zagreb Academy ===
On 11 September 2018, Ali Eid joined Dinamo Zagreb Academy on loan one season on loan from Al Ain.

=== Al-Fujairah ===
On 8 July 2020, Eid joined Al-Fujairah on loan one season on loan from Al Ain.
