= Mohammed Abo Sandah =

Emirati footballer (born 1995)

Mohammed Busanda
Personal information
- Full name: Mohammed Saeed Busanda Al-Falahi
- Date of birth: 20 June 1995 (age 31)
- Place of birth: United Arab Emirates
- Height: 1.80 m (5 ft 11 in)
- Position: Goalkeeper

Team information
- Current team: Al Ain
- Number: 1

Youth career
- Al Ain

Senior career*
Years	Team	Apps	(Gls)
2014–	Al Ain	12	(0)
- * Club domestic league appearances and goals as of 30 December 2021

Mohammed Saeed Busanda Ahmed Al-Falahi (Arabic: محمد سعيد بو سندة أحمد الفلاحي) (born 20 June 1995) is an Emirati footballer. He currently plays for Al Ain. He has played AFC Champions League, Arabian Gulf League, League Cup, and Presidents Cup.

== Honours ==
Al Ain

- UAE Pro-League: 2017–18
- UAE Pro League: 2021–22
- UAE Pro League: 2025–26
- AFC Champions League: 2023-24
- UAE President's Cup: 2017–18,2025–26

- UAE League Cup: 2021-22
- FIFA Club World Cup runner-up: 2018
