= Hazza bin Zayed Stadium =

Association football stadium in the United Arab Emirates

- اِسْتَاد هَزَّاع بِن زَايِد (in Arabic)
- Al-Ain Stadium

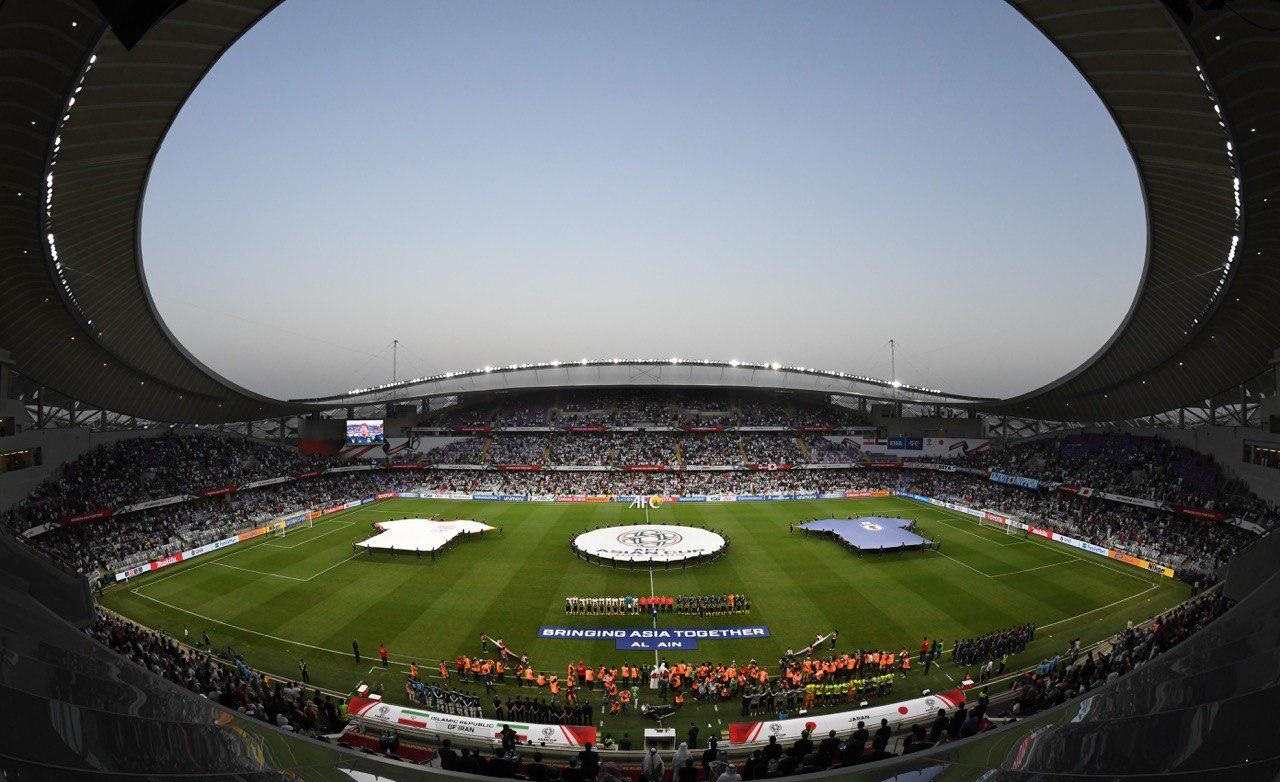
- The stadium on a matchday of 2019 AFC Asian Cup
- Interactive map of Hazza bin Zayed Stadium
- Location: Al-Ain, United Arab Emirates
- Coordinates: 24°14′44.14″N 55°42′59.7″E
- Owner: Al-Ain FC
- Operator: Al-Ain FC
- Capacity: 25,053
- Surface: Grass
- Scoreboard: Yes

Construction
- Groundbreaking: 2025; 1 year ago
- Built: 2012; 14 years ago
- Renovated: 2026; 0 years ago
- Cost: 425 Million AED
- Architect: BDP Pattern
- Project manager: Sorouh Properties (Now merged with Aldar Properties PJSC)
- Structural engineer: Thornton Tomasetti
- Services engineer: Hoare Lea
- General contractor: BAM International

Tenant
- Al-Ain (2014–present)

Website
- alainclub.ae/hazza-bin-zayed-stadium

The Hazza bin Zayed Stadium (Arabic: اِسْتَاد هَزَّاع بِن زَايِد, romanized: Istād Hazzāʿ Bin Zāyid) is a multi-purpose stadium, located in the city of Al-Ain, Abu Dhabi, the UAE. It is the home stadium of Al-Ain FC of the UAE Pro-League. The stadium holds 22,717 spectators and opened in 2014. The stadium was named after the chairman of the club, Sheikh Hazza bin Zayed bin Sultan Al Nahyan.

The 45,000 m^{2} (480,000 sq ft) Hazza bin Zayed stadium is split over seven levels, and is one of the most modern sporting venues in the Middle East. It is one of the most sophisticated sports venues in the region.

The stadium broke ground in April 2012 and was completed in December 2014. It was planned for Al-Ain to face Manchester City in the inaugural ceremony of the stadium, but City drew 1–1 with Blackburn Rovers in an English FA Cup match on 4 January and a replay with Rovers scheduled on 15 January prevented the English Premier League champions from a trip to the UAE. However the friendly was instead played after the Premier League season was over and Manchester City beat Al-Ain 3–0. The stadium hosted the 2017 and 2018 FIFA Club World Cups, as well as the 2019 AFC Asian Cup.

== Location and design ==
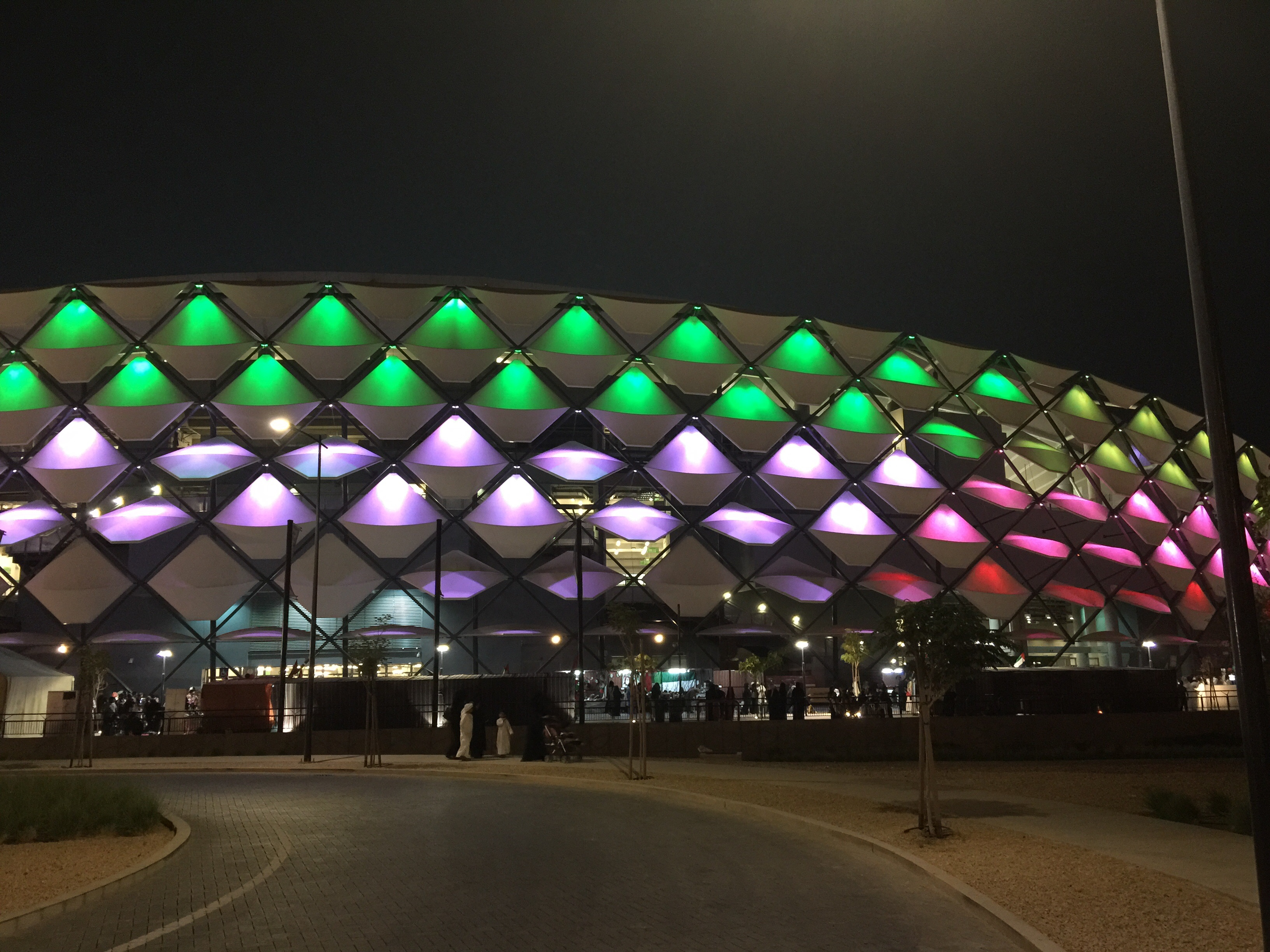
Night illumination of the stadium façade during stadium's opening

The 25,000-seat stadium is located in Al-Ain, approximately 150 kilometres (93 miles) east of Abu Dhabi, close to the borders of Oman. It was designed and built under a contract for a multi-functional stadium in the United Arab Emirates.

The project was realised in close cooperation with sister companies BAM Sports, specialised in stadium construction, and BAM Contractors from Ireland. The scope of work included the construction of a multi-functional stadium with a gross floor area of 45,000 square metres. In addition BAM built a six-storey office building, a sports hall and external works comprising roads, car parking, playing fields and landscaping. The stadium architects were London based BDP Pattern.

One of the most characteristic elements of the stadium is the external facade which consists of fabric elements resembling the trunk of a palm tree that also can be lighted by LED lights in 15 different content modes. On the top of the stadium roof, 200 floodlights are fixed to provide the illumination of after-dark soccer games. Due to the extreme temperatures during the hot summer months, the palm bowl shape of the roof also provides pleasant conditions for both the players and the fans. It is one of the stadium's unique features, which is designed in a way that matches can take place in the shadow after 5pm. On the inside, it reveals the complex geometry of its cantilevered steel trusses, which was achieved by using robotic cutting and welding technology. The stadium is the first stadium in the world to featuring a unique parasol roof designed specifically to fully shade all fans.

Hazza Bin Zayed Stadium was voted Stadium of the Year 2014.

== History and facilities ==
The stadium has been completed after a 16-month ultra-fast track construction project after being started on 1 June 2012. Built to FIFA standards, the stadium covers an area of 45,000 m^{2} (480,000 sq ft) with a capacity of 25,000 seats. The scope of the project further included a sports hall, commercial buildings and extensive exterior landscaping. The stadium is an integral part of a new, wider community. It was planned become the centrepiece of a 500,000 m^{2} (5,400,000 sq ft) development that will include a 175-room hotel, a community of 700 residential units in a complex of 700 apartments and green spaces, two office buildings, a sports centre, retail outlets and 50 restaurants. The hotel, Aloft Al-Ain, was completed in 2017.

The project is the first component of this broader development that would have its effect first on the city of Al-Ain, but also on the wider region, including the neighboring countries of the Gulf Cooperation Council. It was a design and build contract. BAM introduced a lot of value engineering proposals which had to be integrated into the design and therefore new building permits were required within the 18 months. BAM International started the project in mid-2012 and remained right on schedule with all aspects of the construction, making use of 10.5 million man hours. At peak there were 400 men staff up to the supervisor level, and 4500 labourers on site.

== Transportation ==
There are a number of routes to get to Hazza Bin Zayed Stadium. The stadium is 15 minutes from Al Ain Airport.

Route A: From Abu Dhabi City:

- On leaving the suburbs of Al-Ain, pass through Al Yahar area, and take the exit that leads to Al Salamat area.
- Cross straight through Al Salamat roundabout, and continue through the area of Al Bateen to EXTRA Mall.
- Cross straight across over a number of roundabouts until you reach Al Tawia Garden roundabout.
- Cross straight over Al Tawia Garden roundabout and the Stadium will be on your left.

Route B: From Abu Dhabi:

- Pass through Al Maqam area and cross the Tawam Roundabout to (Al Daiwan Roundabout No 178).
- Straight across the roundabout and the entrance to the stadium in on the right.

Route C: From Dubai:

- Drive to Al-Ain city through Dubai – Al-Ain road.
- Pass through Al-Hayer area and continue on the high way until you reach Al-Ain Dairy Farms which will be on the right.
- Turn left at the next exit and continue straight on and follow the signs to UAE University and Hazza Bin Zayed Stadium.
- At the roundabout take left and cross straight on and the entrance to the stadium will be on the right.

Route D: From Fujairah:

- Take Sheikh Mohamed Bin Zayed road (Emirates Road) and join the Dubai–Al Ain Road.
- Pass through Al Hayer area and continue on the high way until you reach Al-Ain Dairy Farms which will be on the right.
- Turn left at the next exit and continues straight on and follows the signs to UAE University and Hazza Bin Zayed Stadium.
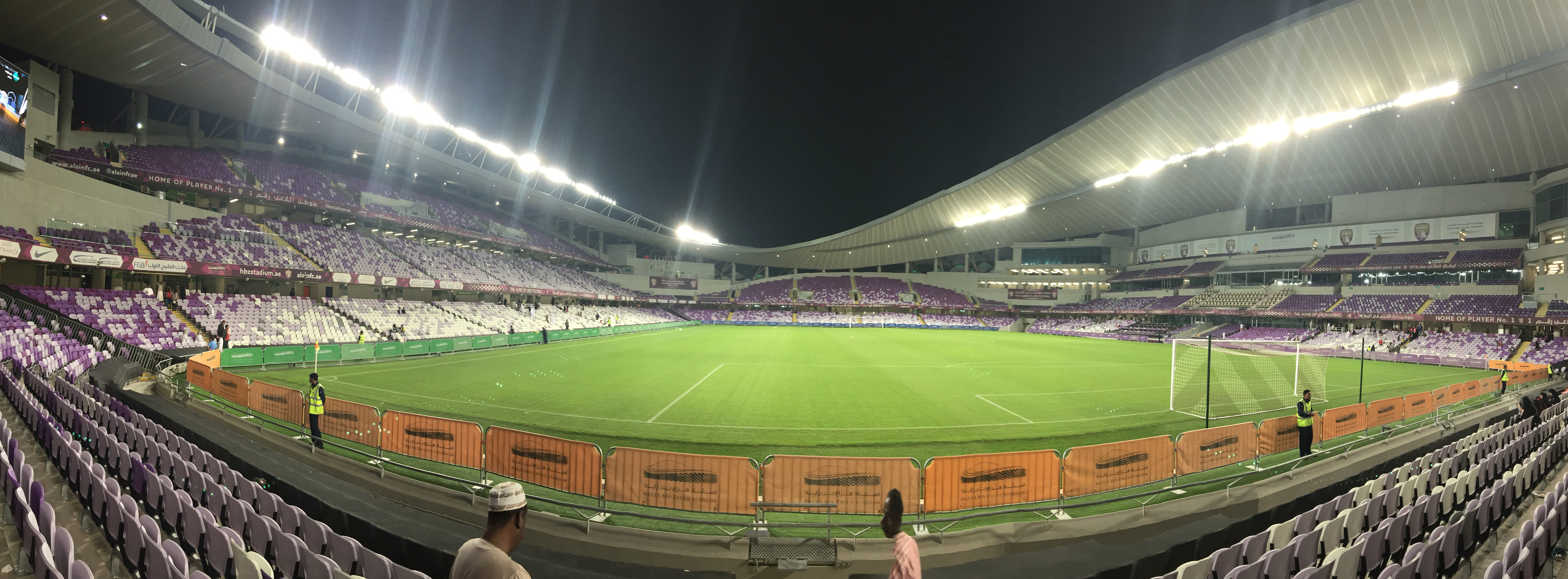
A panoramic view inside the stadium

== 2019 AFC Asian Cup ==
Hazza bin Zayed Stadium hosted eight games of the 2019 AFC Asian Cup, including a Round of 16, quarter-final and semi-final match.

Date	Time	Team No. 1	Res.	Team No. 2	Round	Attendance
6 January 2019	15:00	Australia	0–1	Jordan	Group B	4,934
9 January 2019	20:00	Qatar	2–0	Lebanon	Group E	7,847
11 January 2019	20:00	Kyrgyzstan	0–1	South Korea	Group C	4,893
13 January 2019	20:00	United Arab Emirates	1–1	Thailand	Group A	17,809
16 January 2019	20:00	Vietnam	2–0	Yemen	Group D	8,237
20 January 2019	18:00	Thailand	1–2	China	Round of 16	8,026
25 January 2019	20:00	United Arab Emirates	1–0	Australia	Quarter-finals	25,053
28 January 2019	18:00	Iran	0–3	Japan	Semi-finals	23,262

== See also ==
- List of football stadiums in the United Arab Emirates
- Lists of stadiums
