= Yahia Nader =

Emirati footballer (born 1998)

Yahia Nader يَحْيَى نَادِر
Personal information
- Full name: Yahia Nader Moustafa Elsharif
- Date of birth: 11 September 1998 (age 28)
- Place of birth: Abu Dhabi, United Arab Emirates
- Height: 1.77 m (5 ft 10 in)
- Positions: Defensive midfielder; centre back

Team information
- Current team: Baniyas (on loan from Al Ain)
- Number: 14

Youth career
- 2013-2018: Al Ain

Senior career*
| Years | Team | Apps | (Gls) |
| 2018– | Al Ain | 125 | (4) |
| 2026– | → Baniyas (loan) | 0 | (0) |

International career
| 2019–2021 | United Arab Emirates U-23 | | |
| 2022– | United Arab Emirates | 31 | (0) |
- * Club domestic league appearances and goals as of 16 December 2023

Yahia Nader Moustafa Elsharif (Arabic: يَحْيَى نَادِر مُصْطَفَى الشَّرِيف; born 11 September 1998) is an Emirati footballer who plays as a defensive midfielder or a centre back for Baniyas, on loan from Al Ain.

== Early life ==
Yahia Nader was born in United Arab Emirates to Egyptian parents.

== Club career ==
He played with Al Ain in juniors and participated in the first team in 2018 after allowing those born in the UAE to participate in the UAE Pro League. On 9 February 2026, Nader joined side Baniyas on a six-month loan.

== International career ==
Nader was called to the Egypt under-20 national team's preliminary squad for the 2017 U-20 Africa Cup of Nations.

Nader was granted Emirati passport in 2019 and was chosen to participate with the UAE Olympic team in the 2020 AFC U-23 Championship.

He received his first international cap for the United Arab Emirates' senior team when coming in as substitute for Abdullah Ramadan at the 75th minute of the World Cup 2022 AFC Playoff against Australia in June 2022.

On 4 January 2024, Nader was named in the UAE's squad for the 2023 AFC Asian Cup.

== Honours ==
Al Ain

- UAE Pro League: 2021-22
- UAE League Cup: 2021-22
- FIFA Club World Cup runner-up: 2018
- AFC Champions League: 2023-24
