= Falah Waleed =

Emirati footballer (born 1998)

Falah Waleed فلاح وليد
Personal information
- Full name: Falah Waleed Jumaa Al-Junaibi
- Date of birth: 13 September 1998 (age 28)
- Place of birth: Al Ain, United Arab Emirates
- Height: 1.78 m (5 ft 10 in)
- Position: Midfielder

Team information
- Current team: Al-Fujairah
- Number: 12

Youth career
- -2018: Al Ain

Senior career*
Years	Team	Apps	(Gls)
2018–2024	Al Ain	40	(1)
2020–2022	→ Khor Fakkan (loan)	41	(1)
2024–2025	Dibba Al-Hisn	18	(0)
2025–	Al-Fujairah	0	(0)

International career
2019–2021	United Arab Emirates U23		
2022–	United Arab Emirates	2	(0)
- * Club domestic league appearances and goals

Falah Waleed (Arabic:فلاح وليد) (born 13 September 1998) is an Emirati footballer who plays as a midfielder for Al-Fujairah.

== Career ==
Falah Waleed played with Al Ain in juniors and participated in the first team. In 2018, he was chosen to participate with the Olympic team to participate in 2020 AFC U-23 Championship. On 27 July 2020, he signed with Khor Fakkan on loan from Al Ain for the season 2020–21.

== Honours ==
Al Ain

- AFC Champions League: 2023-24
