= Adel (name) =

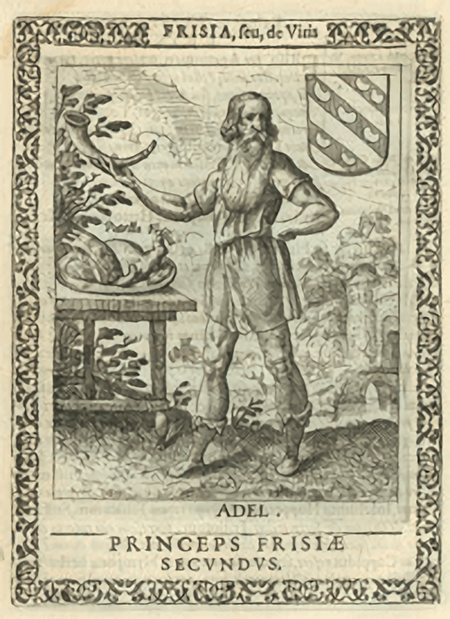
- Illustration of Prince Adel of Frisia (son of King Friso of Frisia) by Martini Hamconii
- Pronunciation: /ˈɑːdəl/
- Gender: Masculine and feminine
- Language: Proto-Germanic
- Name day: 20 October (Adeline); 16 December (Adelaide); 24 December (Adèle)

Origin
- Language: Proto-Germanic
- Derivation: From proto-Germanic "aþalą" and "ōþilą"
- Meaning: Noble, nobility, elite
- Region of origin: Northern Europe

Other names
- Variant forms: Adell, Ådel, Ädel, Ádel, Adél, Adal, Adil, Adiel, Ædel, Édel, Edel
- Pet names: Addy, Addie, Adels, Addles, Al, Adelie
- Related names: Adelson, Adeldaughter, Adelantis, Adelais, Adelaide, Adeliza, Adeline, Adelina, Adelle, Adella, Adelta, Adelia, Aderic, Adolf, Albert, Alice, Ethel, Ethelle

Adel is a given name of ancient European origins that evolved from words meaning "noble", "nobility" or "elite".

It is derived primarily from the languages of north-western Europe, which include English, French, Luxembourgish, German, Dutch, Frisian, Danish, Norwegian, Swedish, Finnish, Faroese, and Icelandic. Today, "Adel" is a gender-neutral given name and short form of given names with this combining element.

Nordic variants of the name include Ådel, Ädel, Ádel, and Ædel. German and Dutch variants of the name include Adal and Edel. French variants of the name include Édel and Adél (not to be confused with Adèle). Adelson and Adelaide are notable masculine and feminine forms. Adelle (Adèle) is a popular feminine alternative.

Although global, Adel remains prominent in north-western European countries. It can also be found as a family name with or without an affix (such as de Adel, den Adel, or van Adel).

The earliest known woman with the name was Princess Adel of Liège (born c. 632 AD). The earliest known man with the name was King Adel of Sweden (born c. 572 AD). His son's name was Adelson The legendary king of the Frisians and founder of the kingdom, Friso, had a son named Adel (later king of Frisia), supposedly born in the 3rd century BC.

Adel is an exemplar of a monothematic name. It is also the root of the names Adelais, Aderic, Adolf, Albert, and Alice, and their variants in other languages.

It is not related to the Arabic name Adil, also spelled Adel, which derives from the root 'ādil, meaning just or equitable.

== Origins ==
=== Ancient words ===
The name derives from Old Dutch "ōþil", Old German "adal", Old Norse "aðal", Old French "œ̄ðel", and Old English "æðel" by evolution of proto-Germanic "aþalą" (meaning "noble" and "kin") and "ōþilą" (meaning "inheritance" and "rule of the land").

Today, "adel" is used throughout much of north-western Europe as the word for nobility.

== Popularity ==
=== Globally ===
Adel was found over 4,000 times as a family name and over 15,000 times as a given name in 55 different countries. It is a relatively rare name. Aside from Nordic countries, it is most prominent in the United States, the United Kingdom, France, Kazakhstan and Russia.

== Pronunciation ==
English: /ˈɑːdəl/

Adel

== Variations ==
=== Other languages ===
English	French	Dutch	German	Danish	Norwegian	Swedish	Finnish	Icelandic	Russian	Kazakh
Adel	Adél	Adel	Adel	Adel	Adel	Adel	Adel	Adel	Адель	Adel (Адель)
Ethel	Édel	Edel	Adal	Ådel	Ådel	Ådel	Ådel	Ádel	Adel	Ädel (Әдел)
	Ethèle		Edel	Ædel	Ædel	Ädel	Ädel	Ædel		Adelia (Аделия)

=== Other forms ===
English	French	Spanish	Italian	Greek	German	Dutch	Danish	Norwegian	Swedish	Icelandic
Adelson					Adelsohn	Adelzoon	Adelsøn	Adelssønn	Adelssön	Adelssonur
Adelantis		Adelantos		Αδελάντης						
Adelais	Adélaïs				Adalheidis					
Adelaide	Adélaïde	Adelaida			Adelheid	Adelhart				
Adeliza				Αδελίζα						
Adeline	Adéline	Adelína			Adelhein					
Adelle	Adèle		Adella							
Adelta		Adelíta		Αδελτα						
Adelia	Adélia	Adelía								Adelía

== Given name ==
=== Royalty ===
- Adel I Friso of Friesland (died c. 245 BC), King of Friesland
- Adel II Atharik of Friesland (died c. 151 BC), King of Friesland
- Adel III Ubbo of Friesland (died c. 71 BC), King of Friesland
- Adel IV Asega Askar of Friesland (died c. 11), King of Friesland

=== Arts and entertainment ===
==== Acting ====
- Adel Adham (1928–1996), Egyptian actor
- Adel Bencherif (born 1975), French actor
- Adel Emam (born 1940), Egyptian film, television, and stage actor
- Adel Abo Hassoon (born 1970), Syrian television actor and voice actor
- Adel Karam (born 1972), Lebanese actor, comedian, and TV presenter

==== Art ====
- Adel Abdessemed (born 1971), Algerian contemporary artist
- Adel Nassief (1962–2021), Egyptian painter
- Adel Rootstein (1930–1992), British mannequin designer

==== Music ====
- Adel Dahdal, Swedish record producer and mix engineer
- Adel Heinrich (1926–2022), American composer, organist, and university teacher
- Adel Kamel (1942–2003), Egyptian music critic, musicologist, and composer
- Adel Souto (born 1969), American musician
- Adel Tawil (born 1978), German singer, songwriter, and producer

==== Writing ====
- Adel Esmat (born 1959), Egyptian novelist
- Adel Karasholi (born 1936), Syrian writer
- Adel Khozam, Emirati poet
- Adel Manna (born 1947), Palestinian historian

=== Business ===
- Adel Al-Ghamdi, Saudi businessman
- Adel Hassan Al A'ali (1957–2018), Bahraini businessman
- Adel Chaveleh, American businessman and CIO of Crane Worldwide Logistics

=== Military ===
- Adel Al Toraifi (born 1979), Saudi journalist and affair specialist
- Adel Emara, Egyptian general
- Adel Flaifel, Bahraini colonel
- Adel Khalil, Egyptian Air Defense Force Commander

=== Politics ===
- Adel Abdel-Hamid (born 1939), Egyptian politician and judge
- Adel Al-Saraawi, Kuwaiti politician
- Adel Al Asoomi (born 1969), Bahraini politician and businessman
- Adel Darwish, British political journalist, reporter, author, historian, broadcaster, and political commentator
- Adel Fakeih (born 1959), Saudi Arabian politician and engineer
- Adel Hussein (1932–2001), Egyptian political activist and journalist
- Adel Labib, Egyptian politician
- Adel Mouwda, Bahraini politician
- Adel Murad (1949–2018), Iraqi politician
- Adel Najafzadeh (born 1973), Iranian politician
- Adel Osseiran (1905–1998), Lebanese politician
- Adel Safar (born 1953), Syrian politician and academic
- Adel Omar Sherif, Egyptian politician and judge
- Adel Tamano, Filipino educator, lawyer and politician
- Adel Younis (died 1976), Egyptian jurist and politician
- Adel Yzquierdo (born 1945), Cuban politician and engineer
- Adel Zawati (1920–1984), Palestinian politician

=== Sciences ===
- Adel F. Halasa, American scientist
- Adel Mahmoud (1941–2018), Egyptian-American doctor
- Adel Ramzy, Egyptian surgeon
- Adel Sedra (born 1943), Egyptian-Canadian electrical engineer and professor

=== Sports ===
- Adel Abbas (born 1982), Bahraini footballer
- Adel Abdulaziz (born 1980), Emirati footballer
- Adel Abdullah (born 1984), Syrian footballer
- Adel Adili (born 1974), Libyan long-distance runner
- Adel Ahmed (born 1990), Qatari footballer
- Adel Ahmed Malalla (born 1961), Qatari footballer
- Adel Al-Anezi (born 1977), Kuwaiti footballer
- Adel Al-Ghaith, Kuwaiti swimmer
- Adel Al-Hammadi (born 1991), Emirati footballer
- Adel Al-Hosani (born 1989), Emirati footballer
- Adel Al-Kahham (born 1972), Kuwaiti handball player
- Adel Al-Muwallad (born 1997), Saudi footballer
- Adel Al-Najadah (born 1966), Kuwaiti judoka
- Adel Al-Salimi (born 1979), Yemeni footballer
- Adel Al-Sulaimane (born 1995), Qatari footballer
- Adel Al Chadli (born 2000), Yemeni footballer
- Adel Al Mulla (1970–2022), Qatari footballer
- Adel Jadoua Ali (born 1981), Qatari footballer
- Adel Aljabrin (born 1968), Saudi Arabian archer
- Adel Amrouche (born 1968), Belgo-Algerian footballer and manager
- Adel Anzimati-Aboudou (born 2001), Comorian footballer
- Adel Aref (born 1980), Tunisian tennis umpire
- Adel Bader (born 1997), Qatari footballer
- Adel Basulaiman (born 1982), Emirati footballer
- Adel Belal (born 1987), Egyptian footballer
- Adel Habib Beldi (born 1994), Algerian footballer
- Adel Bettaieb (born 1997), French footballer
- Adel Bougueroua (born 1987), Algerian footballer
- Adel Bousmal (born 1985), Algerian handball goalkeeper
- Adel Belkacem Bouzida (born 2002), Algerian footballer
- Adel Chbouki (born 1971), Moroccan footballer
- Adel Chedli (born 1976), French footballer
- Adel Djerrar (born 1990), Algerian footballer
- Adel Eid (born 1984), Finnish footballer
- Adel El-Maamour (born 1955), Egyptian football goalkeeper
- Adel El-Moalem (born 1946), Egyptian water polo player
- Adel El-Sharkawy (born 1966), Egyptian handball player
- Adel El Hadi (born 1980), Algerian footballer
- Adel Fadaaq (born 1992), Emirati footballer
- Adel Fellous (born 1978), French rugby league footballer
- Adel Ferdosipour (born 1974), Iranian journalist, football commentator, translator, university professor, and television host and producer
- Adel Gafaiti (born 1994), French footballer
- Adel Gamal (born 1993), Emirati footballer
- Adel Gholami (born 1986), Iranian volleyball player
- Adel Guemari (born 1984), French-Algerian footballer
- Adel Hamek (born 1992), Algerian badminton player
- Adel Hammoude (born 1960), Syrian boxer
- Adel Hekal (1934–2018), Egyptian football goalkeeper
- Adel Humoud (born 1986), Kuwaiti footballer
- Adel Ibrahim Ismail (born 1951), Egyptian basketball player
- Adel Khamis (born 1965), Qatari footballer
- Adel Khechini (born 1964), Tunisian volleyball player
- Adel Khudhair (born 1954), Iraqi footballer and coach
- Adel Kolahkaj (born 1985), Iranian footballer
- Adel Lakhdari (born 1989), Algerian footballer
- Adel Lami (born 1985), Qatari footballer
- Adel Langue (born 1997), Mauritian footballer
- Adel Massaad (born 1964), Egyptian-German table tennis player
- Adel Maïza (born 1983), Algerian footballer
- Adel Mechaal (born 1990), Morocco-Spanish runner
- Adel Messali (born 1983), Algerian footballer
- Adel Mojallali (born 1993), Iranian canoeist
- Adel Ibrahim Moustafa (1930–2005), Egyptian wrestler
- Adel Nasser (born 1970), Iraqi footballer and coach
- Adel Nefzi (born 1974), Tunisian footballer
- Adel Nima (born 1970), Iraqi footballer and coach
- Adel Abdel Rahman (born 1967), Egyptian footballer and manager
- Adel Sabeel (born 1998), Emirati footballer
- Adel Sarshar (born 1992), Iranian footballer
- Adel Sellimi (born 1972), Tunisian footballer and coach
- Adel Sennoun (born 1967), Algerian volleyball player
- Adel Sesay (born 1990), Sierra Leonean sprinter
- Adel Smirani (born 1967), Tunisian footballer
- Adel Taarabt (born 1989), Moroccan footballer
- Adel Tankova (born 2000), Ukrainian-born Israeli Olympic figure skater
- Adel Tlatli, Tunisian basketball coach
- Adel Weir (born 1983), South African squash player
- Adel Zhexenbinova (born 1999), Kazakhstani archer

=== Other ===
- Adel Abdulhehim (born 1974), Chinese prisoner
- Adel Arnaout (born 1970), Lebanese criminal
- Adel Abdel Bari (born 1960), Egyptian terrorist
- Adel Hassan Hamad (born 1958), Sudan prisoner
- Adel Iskandar (born 1977), British scholar, postcolonial theorist, analyst, and academic
- Adel Ismail (historian) (1928–2010), Lebanese diplomat and historian
- Adel Ben Mabrouk (born 1970), Tunisian criminal
- Adel Noori (born 1979), Chinese prisoner
- Adel Zaky (1947–2019), Egyptian Roman Catholic prelate

== Family name ==
=== Arts and entertainment ===
- Daniel Adel (born 1962), American painter and illustrator
- Sharon den Adel (born 1974), Dutch singer and composer
- Ilunga Adell (born William Adell Stevenson in 1948), American television and film producer, screenwriter and actor
- Joan Elies Adell i Pitarch (born 1968), Catalan-language poet and essayist
- Traci Adell, Playboy Playmate of the Month for July 1994

=== Politics ===
- Ted Adel, Canadian politician, member of the Legislative Assembly of Yukon

=== Sciences ===
- Arthur Adel (1908–1994), American astronomer and astrophysicist

=== Sports ===
- Carolyn Adel (born 1978), Suriname swimmer and Olympian
- Gun Ädel (1938–2021), Swedish cross-country skier
- Jo Adell (born 1999), American baseball player

== Fictional characters ==
- Adell (アデル), a major character in the video game Disgaea 2: Cursed Memories
- Adel Frost (아델 프로스트), a minor character in the now-discontinued two-dimensional side-scrolling MMORPG Grand Chase
- Adel, a minor antagonist character in the video game Final Fantasy VIII
- Adél, a character in GeGeGe no Kitaro (2018)
- Coco Adel, a character in the RWBY television show and novels
- Dr. Adel, a recurring character in the animated web series Masameer

== See also ==
- Adel (disambiguation)
- Adel (surname)
- Germanic name
