= Adil =

- Pronunciation: Arabic: [ˈʕaːdɪl, ˈʕæːdel]
- Gender: Masculine

Origin
- Language: Arabic
- Origin: عادل
- Meaning: "fair", "equitable" and "just"
- Region of origin: Arab world

Other names
- Alternative spelling: Adeel, Adel

Adil (also transliterated as Adel, Arabic: عادل) is an Arabic masculine given name and surname. Adil is a variation of the name Adel, an Arabic male name that comes from the word Adl, meaning "fairness" and "justice". It is a common name in the Muslim world.

It is not to be confused with the Germanic name Adel, which has a different pronunciation.

== People ==
Adil and its variants may refer to a number of notable people:

=== Given name ===
==== Egyptian royalty ====
- Al-Adil I of Egypt (1145–1218), 4^{th} Ayyubid Sultan of Egypt and Damascus
- Al-Adil II of Egypt (c. 1221–1248), 6^{th} Ayyubid Sultan of Egypt and Damascus
- Al-Adil Kitbugha of Egypt (died 1296), 10^{th} Mamluk Sultan of Egypt and Syria

==== Adil Shahi dynasty ====
- Yusuf Adil Shah (1450–1511), founder of the Adil Shahi dynasty that ruled the Sultanate of Bijapur for nearly two centuries
- Ismail Adil Shah (1498–1534), 2^{nd} Sultan of Bijapur
- Mallu Adil Shah (died c. 1534), 3^{rd} Sultan of Bijapur
- Ibrahim Adil Shah I (died c. 1558), 4^{th} Sultan of Bijapur
- Ali Adil Shah I (died c. 1579), 5^{th} Sultan of Bijapur
- Ibrahim Adil Shah II (1570–1627), 6^{th} Sultan of Bijapur
- Mohammed Adil Shah (died c. 1656), 7^{th} Sultan of Bijapur
- Ali Adil Shah II (died c. 1672), 8^{th} Sultan of Bijapur
- Sikandar Adil Shah (died c. 1686), 9^{th} Sultan of Bijapur

==== Iranian royalty ====
- Adil Shah (died 1749), 2^{nd} Afsharid Shah of Iran

==== Politics and business ====
- Adil Biçer (born 1974), Turkish politician
- Adel Chaveleh, American businessman and CIO of Crane Worldwide Logistics
- Adil Çarçani (1922–1997), Albanian politician
- Adel Fakeih (born 1959), Saudi Arabian engineer and politician
- Adel Al Jubeir (born 1962), Saudi Arabian diplomat
- Adil Karaismailoğlu (born 1969), Turkish mechanical engineer, civil servant and politician
- Adel Labib, Egyptian politician
- Adel Mouwda, Bahraini politician
- Adel Murad (1949–2018), Iraqi politician
- Adil Nurmemet (born 1968), former Chinese politician
- Adel Osseiran (1905−1998), Lebanese politician
- Adel Safar (born 1953), Syrian politician and academic, Prime Minister of Syria (2011–2012)
- Adel Al-Saraawi (born 1962), Kuwaiti politician
- Adil Shayakhmetov (born 1956), Kazakhstani politician
- Adel Smith (1960–2014), born as Emilio Smith in Alexandria, Egypt, Italian Muslim activist, and radical fundamentalist
- Adel al Zamel (born 1963), Kuwaiti held in extrajudicial detention in the U.S. Guantanamo Bay detention camps in Cuba
- Adil Zulfikarpašić (1921–2008), Bosniak politician and intellectual

==== Literature and journalism ====
- Adil Asadov (born 1958), Azerbaijani philosopher
- Adel Ferdosipour (born 1974), Iranian journalist, translator, sports commentator and television show host and producer
- Adel Hammouda (born 1968), Egyptian journalist
- Adel Karasholi (born 1936), German writer
- Adel Kutuy (1903−1945), Soviet Tatar poet, writer and playwright
- Adel Manna (born 1947), Israeli Palestinian historian
- Adel Al Toraifi (born 1979), Saudi Arabian journalist

==== Art and cinema ====
- Adel Abdessemed (born 1971), French Algerian conceptual artist
- Adel Adham (1928–1996), Egyptian actor
- Adel Bencherif (born 1975), French actor
- Adel Abo Hassoon (born 1970), Syrian television actor and voice actor
- Adil Hussain (born 1963), Indian actor
- Adel Imam (born 1940), Egyptian actor
- Adel Kamel (1942–2003), Egyptian musicologist
- Adel Karam (born 1972), Lebanese television host and actor
- Adil Khan (born 1983), Norwegian actor
- Adel Nassief (1962–2021), Egyptian painter
- Adil Omar (born 1991), Pakistani rapper and singer-songwriter
- Adil Ray (born 1974), British actor, writer and broadcaster
- Adel Tawil (born 1978), German singer
- Adil El Arbi (born 1988), Moroccan-Belgian filmmaker

==== Science ====
- Adel F. Halasa (born 1933), American scientist
- Adel Mahmoud (1941–2018), Egyptian-born American doctor and expert in infectious diseases
- Adel S. Sedra (born 1943), Egyptian Canadian electrical engineer

==== Sport ====
- Adil Basher (1926–1978), Iraqi footballer
- Adil Belgaïd (born 1970), Moroccan judoka
- Adil Bourabaa (born 2005), Algerian footballer
- Adil Chihi (born 1988), Moroccan footballer
- Adil Ibragimov (born 1989), Russian footballer
- Adil El Makssoud (born 1985), Moroccan basketball player
- Adil Ramzi (born 1977), Moroccan footballer
- Adil Rashid (born 1988), English cricketer
- Adil Shamasdin (born 1982), Canadian tennis player
- Adel Abdulaziz (born 1980), Emirati footballer
- Adel Abdullah (born 1984), Syrian footballer
- Adel Amrouche (born 1968), Algerian football manager
- Adel Chedli (born 1976), Tunisian footballer
- Adel Eid (born 1984), Egyptian-Finnish footballer
- Adel Fellous (born 1978), French rugby league player
- Adel Guemari (born 1984), French footballer
- Adel El Hadi (born 1980), Algerian footballer
- Adil Hajizada (born 2005), Azerbaijani gymnast
- Adel Humoud (born 1986), Kuwaiti footballer
- Adel Kolahkaj (born 1985), Iranian footballer
- Adel Lakhdari (born 1989), Algerian footballer
- Adel Lami (born 1985), Qatari footballer
- Adel Maïza (born 1983), Algerian footballer
- Adel Massaad (born 1964), Egyptian table tennis player
- Adel Messali (born 1983), Algerian footballer
- Adel Nefzi (born 1974), Tunisian footballer
- Adel Sellimi (born 1972), Tunisian footballer
- Adel Taarabt (born 1989), Moroccan footballer
- Adel Tlatli (born 1958), Tunisian basketball coach
- Adel Abdel Rahman (born 1967), Egyptian footballer and coach
- Adel Adili (born 1974), Libyan long-distance runner
- Adel Belal (born 1987), also known as Adel El Siwi, Egyptian footballer
- Adel Chbouki (born 1971), Moroccan footballer
- Adel Gafaiti (born 1994), Algerian footballer
- Adel Ibrahim Ismail (born 1951), Egyptian basketball player
- Adel Khudhair (born 1954), Iraqi footballer and coach
- Adel Langue (born 1997), Mauritian footballer
- Adel Mechaal (born 1990), Morocco-born Spanish middle-distance runner
- Adel Mojallali (born 1993), Iranian canoeist
- Adel Ahmed Malalla (born 1961), Qatari footballer
- Adel Nasser (born 1970), Iraqi footballer and coach
- Adel Al-Salimi (born 1979), Yemeni footballer

==== Religion ====
- Adil al-Kalbani (born 1959), former Grand Mosque Imam
- Adel T. Khoury (1930–2023), Lebanese-born German Catholic theologian

=== Middle name ===
- Ahmed Adel Abdel Moneam (born 1987), Egyptian footballer
- Mohamed Adel Gomaa (born 1993), Egyptian footballer

=== Surname ===
==== Arts, literature, and entertainment ====
- Hany Adel (born 1976), Egyptian guitarist, vocalist, and screen actor
- Zizi Adel (born 1987), Egyptian singer
- Buyong Adil (1907–1976), Malaysian historian

==== Politics ====
- Mohammed Adel (youth leader) (born 1988), Egyptian activist
- Ahmed Adil (born 1973), Guantanamo detainee

==== Sport ====
- Carolyn Adel (born 1978), Surinamese Olympic swimmer
- Deng Adel (born 1996), Australian basketball player
- Mohamed Adel (born 1978), Egyptian football referee
- Ramy Adel (born 1979), Egyptian footballer
- Yathreb Adel (born 1996), Egyptian squash player
- Farhan Adil (born 1977), Pakistani cricketer

=== Fictional characters ===
- Âdel, a character in Pleasure and Suffering
- Adel, a character in Winter of Discontent (film)
- Adel, a character in Alexandria... Why?

== See also ==
- Adila (name), feminine version
- Adel (name)
- Arabic name
