= Fusion Specialties =

American mannequin manufacturing company

- Company type: Subsidiary
- Industry: Clothing
- Founded: 1986; 40 years ago in Huntington Beach, California, US
- Founders: Jim Talaric, Jim Barber
- Headquarters: Lafayette, Colorado, United States
- Products: Mannequins
- Number of employees: 110 (2006)
- Parent: Noa Brands Global
- Website: fusionspecialties.com

Fusion Specialties is an American company that manufactures mannequins. The company has been a subsidiary of Spanish company Noa Brands since 2013 and _{ref}manufactures mannequins Westminster, Colorado United States, China, Mexico and Spain.

As of 2019, the company makes a variety of custom-designed mannequins to fit the particular clothing product lines of designers and stores, a practice that has substantially reduced costs for large department stores, as well as played a role in the industry changes that no longer require the specialty mannequin dresser job. It employs several fine-art trained artists as sculptors to make the many custom models they produce for various clothing product retailers.

== History ==
Founded in Huntington Beach, California in 1986 by Jim Talaric and Jim Barber, the company pioneered new methods of manufacture using polymers (an urethane elastomer) rather than fiberglass, as well as the 2010s trend to begin having lines of fuller-figured and more natural body sizes. Talaric is considered a "trendsetter in manufacturing and durability" of mannequins, who followed in the footsteps of Adel Rootstein, an earlier pioneer in mannequin manufacturing. Judy Townsend, a collector and broker of antique mannequins, has called Talaric "the Henry Ford" of mannequin manufacturing; while "Rootstein is the Rolls-Royce".

The company won their first big retail client, The Limited, in 1990. The company moved from California to Colorado in 1991, at a time that it employed 35 people. By 2006, the company was producing more than 50,000 mannequins per year, with 110 employees, and their clients included Victoria's Secret, Banana Republic, REI, Chico's, The Gap, and Old Navy. Retail industry DDI Magazine said that, "If they're not the largest [in the industry], they're certainly one of the largest."

In 2007, the company was acquired by private equity firm Blue Sage Capital of Austin, Texas.

The company was acquired in 2013 by Noa Brands Global, a holding company headquartered in Barcelona, Spain, after it acquired Visual Merchandising Inc which then owned the company.
