= Al-Dahhak ibn Muzahim =

Hadith narrator

Personal life
- Died: 105 AH / 723 AD
- Era: 8th century
- Region: Islamic Golden Age
- Main interest(s): Hadith, Tafsir, Islamic Jurisprudence
- Notable idea(s): Interpretations of the Quran and Hadith
- Notable work: Numerous narrations in Hadith literature

Religious life
- Religion: Islam
- Denomination: Sunni

Muslim leader
- Influenced: later Islamic scholars

Al-Dahhak ibn Muzahim (died; 105 AH / 723 AD) was a figure in early Islamic scholarship, known for his contributions to Hadith literature, Quranic exegesis, and Islamic jurisprudence. Despite the controversy surrounding the authenticity of some of his narrations, his influence is widely acknowledged in historical and religious texts. Scholars such as Ibn Hibban recognized his efforts, while others viewed his work with skepticism.

== Career ==
=== Hadith contributions ===
His contributions to Hadith literature are recorded in various sources. The 1000 Qudsi Hadiths: An Encyclopedia of Divine Sayings mentions Al-Dahhak's narrations through a chain of transmitters, reflecting his involvement in the dissemination of Hadith.

Recep Şentürk in Narrative Social Structure mentions that Ibn Hibban honored Al-Dahhak and stated that he did not hear directly from Ibn Abbas, despite a large group of scholars considering him weak.

=== Exegesis and Tafsir ===
Al-Dahhak also made significant contributions to Tafsir (Quranic exegesis). In "Tafsir Ibn Kathir Juz' 5," he is noted for his interpretations alongside other prominent scholars like Ibn 'Abbas and Al-Hasan Al-Basri.

== Views ==
=== On Islamic law ===
His views extended to Islamic jurisprudence and law. Abdullah Alwi Haji Hassan's Sales and Contracts in Early Islamic Commercial Law references Al-Dahhak's perspectives on various legal terms and practices in early Islamic commerce.

=== On political and social issues ===
In Democracy: The Rule of Law and Islam, Eugene Cotran and Adel Omar Sherif highlight Al-Dahhak's interpretations related to Islamic governance. He was known for explaining Allah's instruction to Muhammad to consult with his people according to Islamic belief, emphasizing the importance of consultation in governance.

== Religious influence and teachings ==
Al-Dahhak's teachings and religious interpretations were influential during his time. Gozde Hussain's Islamic Doctrines and Political Liberalism discusses his association with renowned Islamic scholars like al-Suyuti and Muhammad Said Ramadan al-Bouti.

== Death ==
Al-Dahhak ibn Muzahim continued his scholarly work until his death in 105 AH (723 AD).
