= Emara =

Emara is a surname. Notable people with the surname include:

- Adel Emara, Egyptian general
- Mohamed Emara (born 1974), Egyptian footballer
- Saleh Emara (born 1982), Egyptian freestyle wrestler
