= Adila (name) =

Adila (and its variant Adela) (Arabic: عادلة/عديلة) is a feminine given name and a surname. Its given name form is a feminine derivative of the name Adil meaning "just and fair". Notable people with the name include:

== Given name ==
- Adela Humood Alaboudi (born 1967), Iraqi politician
- Adila Bayhum (1900–1975), Syrian feminist and political activist
- Adila Fachiri (1886–1962), Hungarian violinist
- Adila Hassim (born 1972), South African lawyer
- Adila Khanum (1879–1929), spouse of Hussein bin Ali, King of Hejaz
- Adila Mutallibova (1938–2019), Azerbaijani physician
- Adila bint Abdullah Al Saud, Saudi royal
- Adila Sedraïa (born 1984), known by her stage name Indila, French singer and songwriter
- Adila Shakhtakhtinskaya (1894–1951), Azerbaijani Soviet physician

== Surname ==
- Ayoub Adila (born 1996), Moroccan football player

== See also ==
- Adila, disambiguation page
- Adile, Turkish version of the name
