= Baniyas Club =

Emirati sports club

Baniyas Club نادي بني ياس الرياضي
- Full name: Baniyas Sports & Cultural Club
- Nickname: Al-Smawi (The Sky Blues)
- Founded: 1982; 44 years ago
- Ground: Baniyas Stadium
- Capacity: 6,927
- Chairman: Saif bin Zayed Al Nahyan
- Head coach: Daniel Isăilă
- League: UAE Pro League
- 2025–26: UAE Pro League, 10th
- Website: www.baniyasclub.ae
Home colours	Away colours

Baniyas Sports & Cultural Club is an Emirati sports club based in Al Shamkha, in the Baniyas area of Abu Dhabi. The club's football section competes in the UAE Pro League.

== Presidency ==
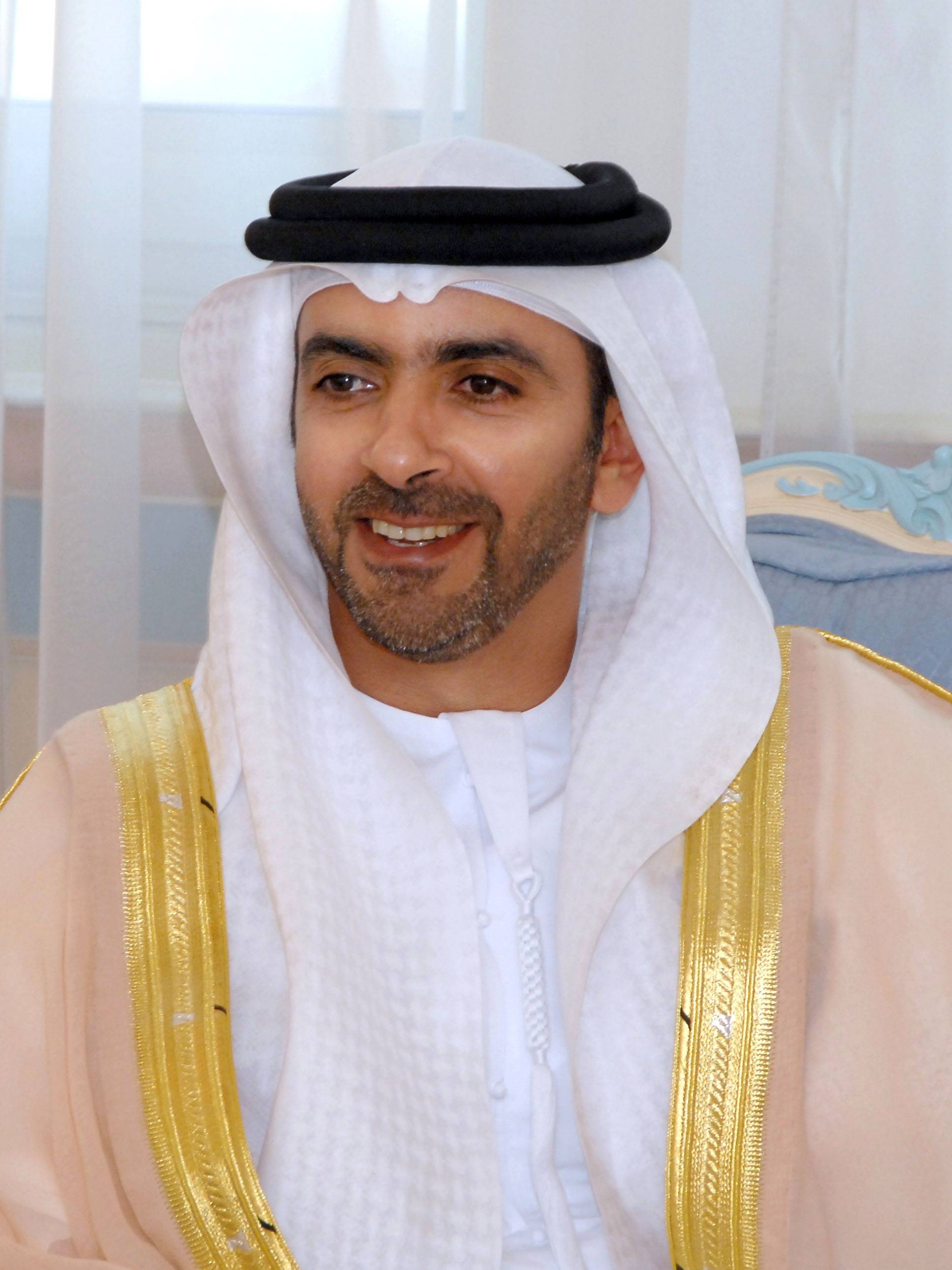
Sheikh Saif bin Zayed Al Nahyan, the current president of Baniyas SC

Position	Name
President	Lt. General Sheikh Saif bin Zayed Al Nahyan
First Vice-president	Sheikh Hamed bin Zayed Al Nahyan
Second Vice-president	Sheikh Omar bin Zayed Al Nahyan

- Source: Presidency

== Honours ==
- President's Cup
  - Winners: 1991–92
- Division One
  - Winners: 1994–95, 2004–05, 2008–09, 2017–18
- Gulf Cup
  - Winners: 2012–13

== Pro-League record ==
Season	Lvl.	Tms.	Pos.	President's Cup	League Cup
2008–09	2	16	1st	Quarter-Finals	—
2009–10	1	12	4th	Round of 16	First Round
2010–11	1	12	2nd	Round of 16	First Round
2011–12	1	12	9th	Runner-ups	First Round
2012–13	1	14	4th	Quarter-Finals	First Round
2013–14	1	14	9th	Round of 16	First Round
2014–15	1	14	8th	Quarter-Finals	Semi-Finals
2015–16	1	14	9th	Semi-Finals	First Round
2016–17	1	14	14th	Round of 16	First Round
2017–18	2	12	1st	Round of 16	—
2018–19	1	14	6th	Round of 16	Semi-Finals
2019–20^{a}	1	14	9th	Semi-Finals	First Round
2020–21	1	14	2nd	Semi-Finals	Quarter-Finals
2021–22	1	14	9th	Semi-Finals	First Round
2022–23	1	14	11th	Quarter-Finals	First Round
2023–24	1	14	10th	Round of 16	First Round

_{Notes 2019–20 UAE football season was cancelled due to the COVID-19 pandemic in the United Arab Emirates.}

Key

- Pos. = Position
- Tms. = Number of teams
- Lvl. = League

== Current technical staff ==
Position	Staff
Head coach	(Romania) Daniel Isăilă
Assistant coaches	(United Arab Emirates) Abdulla Yaqoob (United Arab Emirates) Saad Bashir
Goalkeeping coach	(United Arab Emirates) Ibrahim Sahib Al Baloushi
Fitness coach	(United Arab Emirates) Abbas Mohammed
Conditioning coach	(Bosnia and Herzegovina) Almir Seferovic

== Players ==
As of UAE Pro-League:

Note: Flags indicate national team as defined under FIFA eligibility rules; some limited exceptions apply. Players may hold more than one non-FIFA nationality.

No.	Pos.	Nation	Player
1	GK	UAE	Mohammed Khalaf
2	DF	MLI	Mahamadou Camara
3	DF	BRA	João Victor
4	MF	UAE	Solomon Sosu (on loan from Al-Ain)
5	DF	UAE	Hassan Al-Moharrami
6	MF	GHA	Jacob Awoute
7	MF	UAE	Fawaz Awana
8	MF	UAE	Matar Al-Hosani
9	FW	UAE	Ahmed Fawzi
10	MF	ARG	Lionel Verde (on loan from Unión)
12	FW	MLI	Youssoufou Niakaté
16	DF	UAE	Khalid Al-Hashemi
17	GK	BRA	Luiz Turatto
18	MF	UAE	Suhail Al-Noubi
19	FW	CMR	Rocky Marciano

No.	Pos.	Nation	Player
20	MF	UAE	Saif Al-Menhali
21	MF	UAE	Mackenzie Hunt
23	DF	UAE	Khamis Al Hammadi
25	DF	SRB	Nemanja Dekovic
26	DF	UAE	Khamis Al-Mansoori
27	MF	TUR	Burak İnce
28	MF	MLI	Alassane Diallo
33	GK	UAE	Adel Fadaaq
55	GK	UAE	Fahad Al-Dhanhani
71	DF	UAE	Khalifa Al-Wahidi
72	FW	UAE	Mohamed Awad Alla (on loan from Al-Ain)
73	FW	UAE	Hazza Subait
77	MF	NGR	Saviour Godwin
88	MF	UAE	Ali Al-Mosaabi
98	MF	UAE	Saleh Al-Hosani
—	MF	UZB	Azizjon Ganiev

Players with Multiple Nationalities

- (United Arab Emirates) (Brazil) João Victor
- (United Arab Emirates) (Brazil) Luiz Turatto
- (United Arab Emirates) (Ghana) Solomon Sosu
- (United Arab Emirates) (Serbia) Nemanja Dekovic
- (United Arab Emirates) (Sudan) Mohamed Awad Alla

== Continental record ==
Season	Competition	Round	Opponent	Home	Away	Aggregate	Aggregate
2012	AFC Champions League	Group B	(Qatar) Al-Arabi	2–0	4–0	6-0	2nd in group
2012	AFC Champions League	Group B	(Uzbekistan) Pakhtakor	2–0	1–1	3-1	2nd in group
2012	AFC Champions League	Group B	(Saudi Arabia) Al-Ittihad	0–0	0–1	0-1	2nd in group
2012	AFC Champions League	Round of 16	(Saudi Arabia) Al-Hilal	1–7			16th
2013	GCC Champions League	Group D	(Saudi Arabia) Al-Faisaly	1–1	3–4	4-5	2nd in group
2013	GCC Champions League	Group D	(Bahrain) Busaiteen	0–0	2–1	2-1	2nd in group
2013	GCC Champions League	Quarter-finals	(Bahrain) Al-Muharraq	1–1 (p) (4–3)			Champion
2013	GCC Champions League	Semi-finals	(Saudi Arabia) Najran	2–0	0–1	2–1	Champion
2013	GCC Champions League	Final	(Qatar) Al-Khor	2–0	1–1	3–1	Champion
2014	AFC Champions League	Qualifying play-offs	(Kuwait) Al-Qadsia	0–4			Unqualified
2022	AFC Champions League	Qualifying play-offs	(Uzbekistan) Nasaf Qarshi	0–2			Unqualified

=== Record by country ===
Country	Pld	W	D	L	GF	GA	GD	Win%
Bahrain	3	1	2	0	3	2	+1	33.33
Kuwait	1	0	0	1	0	4	−4	0.00
Qatar	4	3	1	0	9	1	+8	75.00
Saudi Arabia	7	1	2	4	7	14	−7	14.29
Uzbekistan	3	1	1	1	3	3	+0	33.33

== See also ==
- List of football clubs in the United Arab Emirates
