= João Victor (footballer, born 2000) =

Brazilian footballer

Personal information
- Full name: João Victor Lucas Wesner
- Date of birth: 23 March 2000 (age 26)
- Height: 1.82 m (6 ft 0 in)
- Position: Defender

Team information
- Current team: Baniyas
- Number: 3

Senior career*
Years	Team	Apps	(Gls)
2018–2019	Cruzeiro-RS	0	(0)
2019–	Baniyas	58	(0)
- * Club domestic league appearances and goals as of 17:17, 26 October 2019 (UTC)

João Victor Lucas Wesner (born 23 March 2000) is a Brazilian footballer who currently plays for Baniyas.

== Career statistics ==
=== Club ===
As of 26 October 2019.

Club	Season	League			State League		Cup		Continental		Other		Total	
Club	Season	Division	Apps	Goals	Apps	Goals	Apps	Goals	Apps	Goals	Apps	Goals	Apps	Goals
Cruzeiro-RS	2018	–			0	0	0	0	–		3 (Note: Appearances in the Copa FGF)	0	3	0
Cruzeiro-RS	2019	–			1 (Note: Appearances in the Campeonato Gaúcho A2)	0	0	0	–		0	0	1	0
Cruzeiro-RS	Total		0	0	1	0	0	0	0	0	3	0	4	0
Baniyas	2019–20	UAE Pro League	4	0	–		1 (Note: Appearances in the UAE League Cup)	0	0	0	0	0	5	0
Career total			4	0	1	0	1	0	0	0	3	0	9	0
