= Vinaròs =

Vinaròs Vinaroz
- Town and municipality
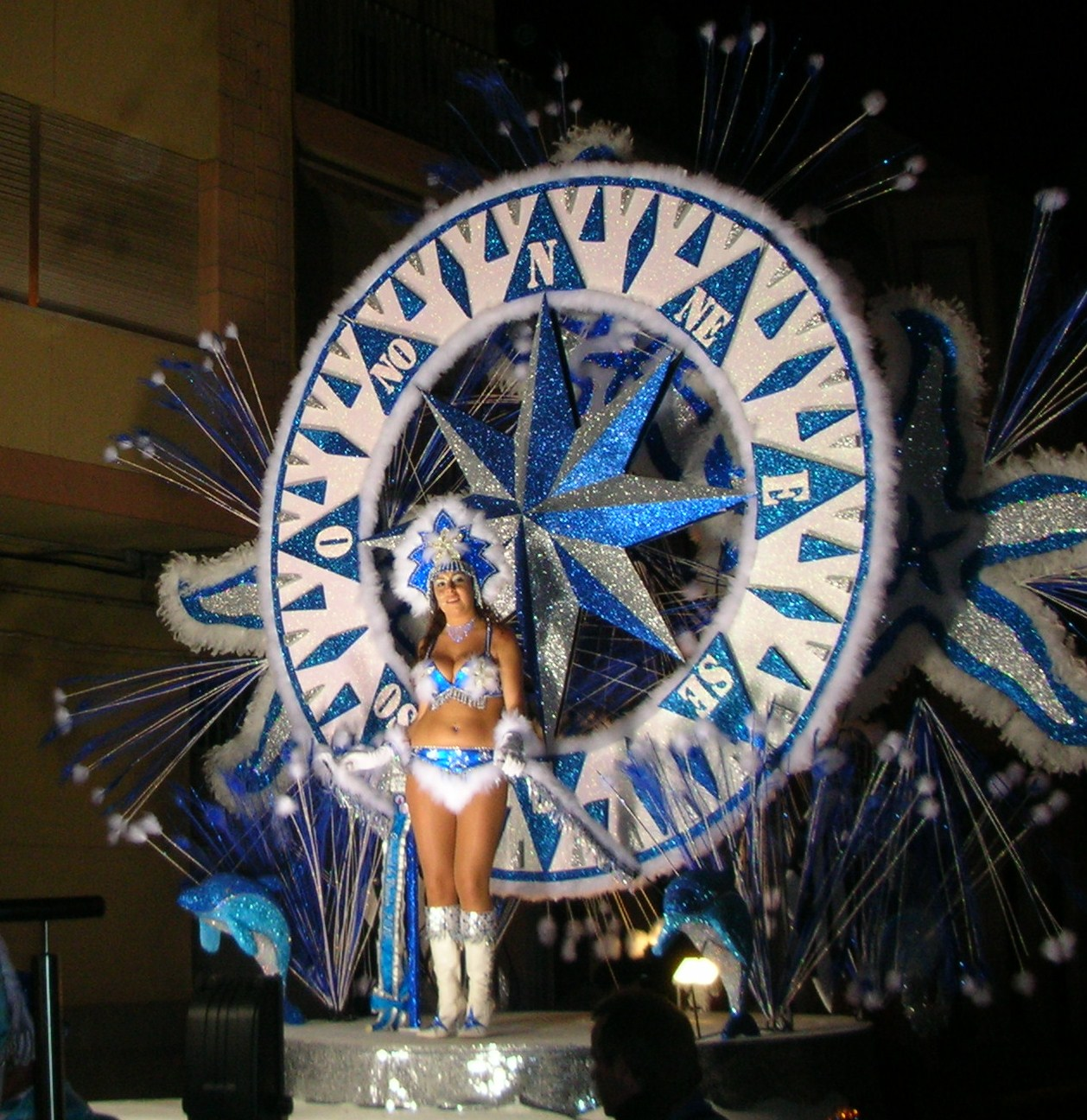
- Carnival in Vinaròs.

- Flag Coat of arms

- Location in Spain Vinaròs (Valencian Community) Vinaròs (Spain)
- Coordinates: 40°28′07″N 0°28′25″E
- Country: Spain
- Autonomous community: Valencian Community
- Province: Castellón
- Region: Baix Maestrat

Government
  - Alcalde (Mayor): Enric Pla Vall (TSV)

Area
  - Total: 95.46 km^{2} (36.86 sq mi)
- Elevation: 7 m (23 ft)

Population (2025-01-01)
  - Total: 30,529
  - Density: 319.8/km^{2} (828.3/sq mi)
- Demonyms: • vinarossenc, -a (Val.) • vinarocense (Sp.)
- Official language(s): Valencian; Spanish
- Linguistic area: Valencian
- Time zone: UTC+1 (CET)
  - Summer (DST): UTC+2 (CEST)
- Website: Official website

Vinaròs, (Note: Pronunciation of Vinaròs: Valencian: [vinaˈɾɔs]) in Valencian (known in Spanish as Vinaroz), (Note: Pronunciation of Vinaroz (unofficial): Spanish: [binaˈɾoθ]) is a town and municipality located in eastern Spain and the capital of the Baix Maestrat in the province of Castellón, Valencian Community. It is in the border between the Valencian Community and Catalonia. Vinaròs is a fishing harbour and tourist destination.

== History ==
The first historical record of Vinaròs is in 1233, when the Moorish hamlet of Binarlaros-Ibn Arus in eastern Al-Andalus was captured by King James I of Aragon. It was under rule of the Knights templar order between 1294 and 1311, and of the order of Montesa during the 14th century.

The town grew during the 16th and 17th centuries, when fortifications and navy yards were built, and became prosperous over the following two centuries, due to its ship building and Valencian wine trade industries. The town declined in the early 20th century as a consequence of the spread of phylloxera in the regions vineyards, which devastated wine production.

Today, the main industries of Vinaròs are tourism and fishing. Prawns are the best known local fisheries product. Vinaròs is part of the Taula del Sénia free association of municipalities.

== Main sights ==
Sights in Vinaròs is the fortress-like Església Arxiprestal de l'Assumpció (Archpriestal Church of the Assumption of Our Lady), built in the prevailing Renaissance architectural style during 1583–1596, with a 'new' Baroque portal added during 1698–1702.

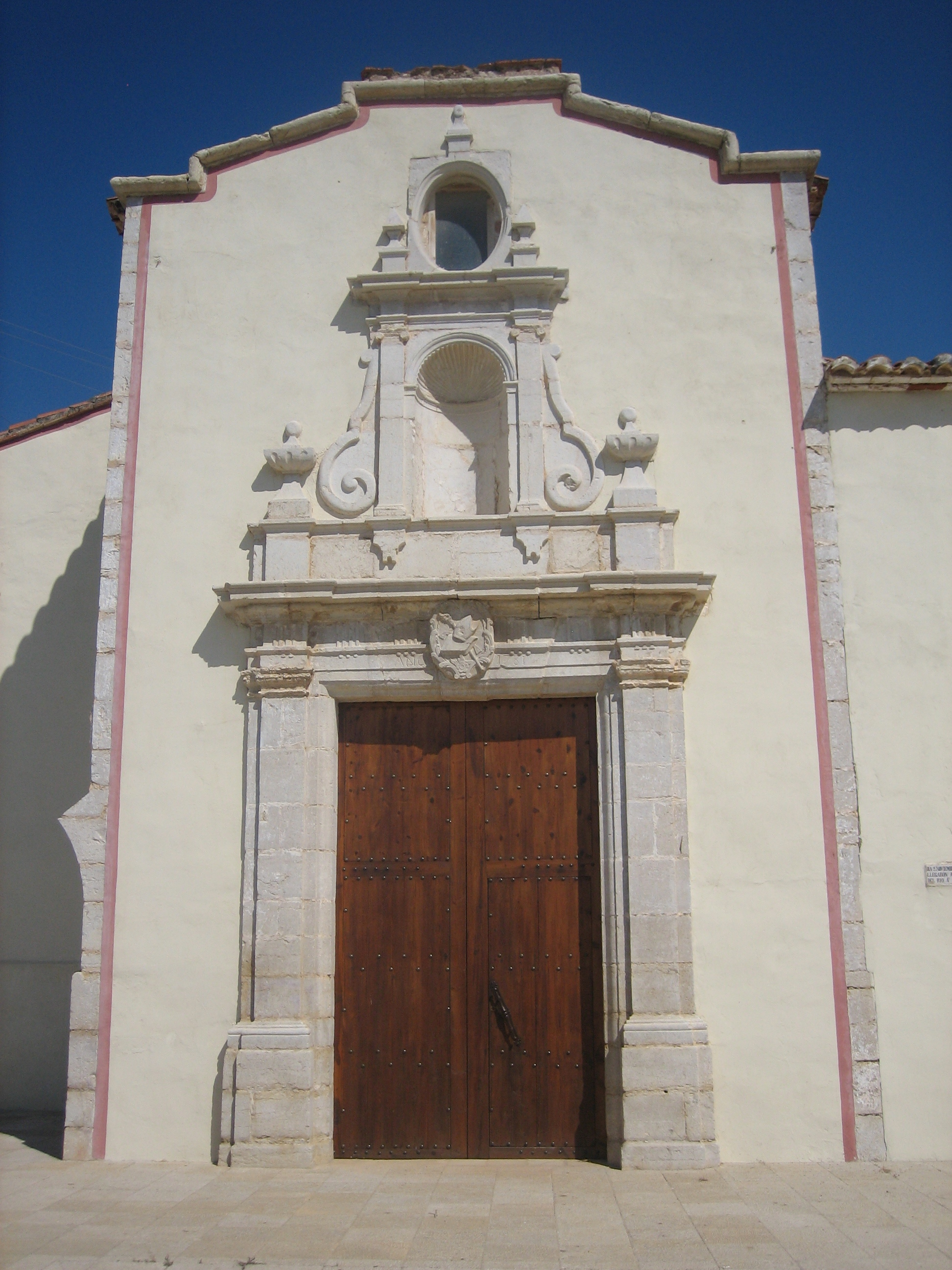
Baroque facade of Sant Gregori de Vinaròs.

== Culture ==
=== Carnival ===
The Carnival of Vinaròs usually takes place during January, February, or March. It has 33 troupes composed of many people (the biggest troupe has around 550 members). Each troupe is represented by a queen dressed in a costume they had made themself.

==== Calendar ====
1st day (Friday): in the Town Hall, Carnival starts by a performance decorated with the Carnival's topic (In 2017 "Bollywood") and the "Carnestoltes" presentation ("Carnestoltes" is a large wooden man dressed in a costume reflecting the Carnival's Topic). Then, the Mayor and the queens open the Carnival's huts enclosure (in the Fóra Forat Walk where each night's parties are held. Each troupe has a hut hosting parties open to the public).

2nd day (Saturday): The Queen's Presentation, where the costume the queen has made is revealed at the old football pitch.

3rd day (Sunday): Flour's battle and Disguised pets Competition in the Carnival's huts enclosure.

4th day (Monday): Dinner for the elderly.

5th day (Tuesday): Karaoke Song Contest.

6th-8th day (Wednesday-Friday): Attendees wear themed costumes and pajamas and visit the Carnival's huts enclosure (Fóra Forat Walk).

9th day (Saturday) and 10th day (Sunday): on Saturday (7 p.m.) and Sunday (6 p.m.), troupes parade in a circuit through the major streets of Calle Pilar, Calle Pablo Ruiz Picasso, Calle San Francisco, Avenida País Valencià, Calle Arcipreste Bono, Plaza 1º de Mayo, Calle Costa y Borrás, Avenida País Valencià, Calle Arcipreste Bono, Calle Socorro, Plaza Jovellar and Calle Pilar.

11th day (Monday): Carnival ends at the Town Hall and then the "Carnestoltes" are burned on the beach or in waste ground.

Moreover, in August there's the Summer Carnival with The Queen's Presentation for tourists.

== Climate ==
Vinaròs has a cold semi-arid climate (Köppen climate classification: BSk) with mild winters and hot summers. Most of precipitation occurs on the autumn season due to the episodes of cold drop that occur on the Mediterranean coast of eastern Spain. Summer nights are cooler compared to other Mediterranean coastal regions, with mean daily minimums around 19 °C (66 °F).

The weather station has been inactive since 2020.

Climate data for Vinaròs (1991–2020), extremes (1991-2020)
Month	Jan	Feb	Mar	Apr	May	Jun	Jul	Aug	Sep	Oct	Nov	Dec	Year
Record high °C (°F)	26.4 (79.5)	27.3 (81.1)	31.7 (89.1)	30.9 (87.6)	34.6 (94.3)	38.9 (102.0)	37.7 (99.9)	38.3 (100.9)	35.6 (96.1)	35.9 (96.6)	30.9 (87.6)	26.0 (78.8)	38.9 (102.0)
Mean daily maximum °C (°F)	15.4 (59.7)	16.3 (61.3)	18.9 (66.0)	21.0 (69.8)	24.9 (76.8)	28.1 (82.6)	31.0 (87.8)	31.0 (87.8)	28.0 (82.4)	24.2 (75.6)	19.1 (66.4)	16.4 (61.5)	22.9 (73.1)
Daily mean °C (°F)	9.8 (49.6)	10.5 (50.9)	12.9 (55.2)	15.0 (59.0)	18.8 (65.8)	22.2 (72.0)	25.2 (77.4)	25.2 (77.4)	22.2 (72.0)	18.4 (65.1)	13.4 (56.1)	10.9 (51.6)	17.0 (62.7)
Mean daily minimum °C (°F)	4.1 (39.4)	4.5 (40.1)	6.8 (44.2)	8.9 (48.0)	12.8 (55.0)	16.2 (61.2)	19.3 (66.7)	19.4 (66.9)	16.3 (61.3)	12.5 (54.5)	7.6 (45.7)	5.4 (41.7)	11.2 (52.1)
Record low °C (°F)	−4.4 (24.1)	−3.8 (25.2)	−3.3 (26.1)	2.7 (36.9)	5.1 (41.2)	7.8 (46.0)	11.0 (51.8)	11.3 (52.3)	7.2 (45.0)	2.1 (35.8)	−2.7 (27.1)	−3.4 (25.9)	−4.4 (24.1)
Average precipitation mm (inches)	40.2 (1.58)	26.0 (1.02)	30.8 (1.21)	31.7 (1.25)	39.6 (1.56)	19.2 (0.76)	10.7 (0.42)	13.2 (0.52)	37.1 (1.46)	60.4 (2.38)	35.6 (1.40)	38.1 (1.50)	382.6 (15.06)
Source: Agencia Estatal de Meteorologia

== Politics ==
In the 2007 Spanish local elections, the People's Party obtained ten city councillors, the PSPV-PSOE, seven, the Partit de Vinaròs Independent (PVI), three, and the Valencian Nationalist Bloc, one.

In the 2011 Spanish local elections, the People's Party obtained an absolute majority with 11 councillors elected. The PSPV-PSOE obtained 6 city councillors, the Valencian Nationalist Bloc 2. The PVI lost two seats, obtaining just one councillor while Republican Left of the Valencian Country obtained 1 city councillor.

In the 2015 Spanish local elections, the People's Party lost three city councillors, obtaining 8 seats. The PSPV-PSOE lost two city councillors, receiving 4. The electors association Each and every one are Vinaròs (TSV) got 5 city councillors and the other political parties obtained the same number of councillors (2 Compromís, 1 Independent Party of Vinaròs and 1 Civic Agreement). The PSPV-PSOE, Commitment Coalition and Each and every one are Vinaròs (TSV) signed the "Stables Covenant" in order to form a government with absolute majority, that is with 11 city councillors (5 of TSV, 4 of PSPV-PSOE and 2 of Compromís). In this document, they agreed that the leader of the most-voted list would be the mayor, Mr. Enric Pla Vall, and the other leaders would be the first and second deputy mayors depending on the elected city councillors they had. So the first deputy mayor was Mr. Guillem Alsina Gilabert from the PSPV-PSOE and the second one was Mr. Domènec Fontanet from Compromís.

Political parties at the Vinaròs City Hall
Political party	Votes	%	City councillors
People's Party (PP)	3.851	30.66	8
Each and every one are Vinaròs (TSV)	2.589	20.61	5
Socialist Party of the Valencian Country (PSPV-PSOE)	2.328	18.53	4
Compromís (Coalició Compromís)	1.153	9.18	2
Civic Agreement (ERPV-EU-EVPV-AS)	791	6.30	1
Independent Party of Vinaròs (PVI)	772	6.15	1

== Notable people ==
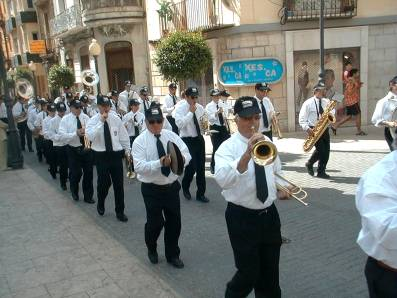
Parade in Vinaròs

- Louis Joseph, Duke of Vendôme (1654–1712), French military leader; died here
- María Conesa (1892–1978) Spanish and Mexican actress
- Carles Santos (1940–2017), pianist, composer, painter, sculptor and performer
- Leopoldo Querol (1899–1985), pianist
- Joan Elies Adell i Pitarch (born 1968), poet
