= Adelais =

Adelais is a given name that may refer to:

- Adelaide of Auxerre, a name referring to multiple people and sometimes given as Adelais
- Audelais of Benevento, name sometimes given as Adelais (lived 730s)
- Adelais, daughter of Pepin the Short (d.768), died in childhood
- Adelaide of Lombardy, name sometimes given as Adelais, wife of Lambert I of Nantes (d.836)
- Adelais of Amboise, wife of Ingelger (d.888)
- Adelais of Vermandois, spouse of Charles, Duke of Lower Lorraine (d. after 935)
- Adelaide-Blanche of Anjou, (c. 940–1026) name also given as Adelais
- Adelais, wife of Ermengol of Rouergue (b.955-d.993)
- Adelaide of Susa (d.1091), name also given as Adelais
- Adelais de Roquefeuil (married 1129)
- Adelais, wife of William II, Count of Nevers (d.1148)
- Adelais, Lady of Venisy (d. 1221)
- Adeliza of Louvain, (d. 1151), sometimes Adelais

== See also ==
- Adel (name)
- Adelaide (given name)
- Adele (given name)
- Alice (given name)
