= Adila =

Adila may refer to:

- Adila, Estonia, a village in Estonia
- Adila (name), an Arabic feminine given name
- Hendrella adila, a species of flies
