= Adelson =

Adelson is a surname. Notable people with the surname include:

- Donna Adelson (born 1950), American convicted murderer
  - Charlie Adelson (born 1976), American convicted murderer, son of Donna Adelson
- Edward H. Adelson (born 1952), American neuroscientist
- Jake Adelson (born 1996), Australian professional footballer
- Jay Adelson (born 1970), American Internet entrepreneur
- Merv Adelson (1929–2015), American real estate developer and television producer who co-founded Lorimar Television
  - Andrew Adelson (born 1954), American television producer, son of Merv Adelson, spouse of Orly
  - Orly Adelson (born 1957), American Israeli television producer, spouse of Andrew
  - Gary Adelson (born April 22, 1953), American television producer, son of Merv Adelson
- Steven A. Adelson, American film director and television director
- Michael Adelson, American orchestral conductor
- Sheldon Adelson (1933–2021), American casino magnate, political donor to the Republican Party, spouse of Miriam Adelson
  - Miriam Adelson (born 1945), Israeli-American doctor, widow and heiress of Sheldon Adelson, political donor to the Republican Party
- Tom Adelson (born 1965), American politician
- Warren Adelson (born 1942), American art dealer, art historian, and author

== See also ==
- Adelson e Salvini, opera by Vincenzo Bellini
- Adelson Foundation, founded by Sheldon and Miriam Adelson
- Adelsohn, surname
- David Adleson, American music journalist
- Georgy Adelson-Velsky (1922–2014), Soviet and Israeli mathematician and computer scientist
- Shirley Adelson Siegel (1918–2020), American lawyer
