= Adelaide of Auxerre =

Some of these individuals are referred to as Adelais in some sources. For other people referred to as Adelais, see Adelais

Adelaide of Auxerre or Adelaide of Burgundy can be used interchangeably and may refer to:

- Adelaide of Auxerre (born c. 849) (c. 849 – c. 929), daughter of Conrad II, Duke of Transjurane Burgundy Count of Auxerre and Waldrada of Worms, wife of Richard, Duke of Burgundy
- Adelaide of Burgundy (born c. 896), daughter of Richard, Duke of Burgundy and Adelaide of Auxerre (b. c. 849), wife of Reginar II, Count of Hainaut
- Adelaide of Upper Burgundy (fl. 914), daughter of Rudolph I of Burgundy, wife of Louis the Blind
- Adelaide of Burgundy (920–967), daughter of Gilbert, Duke of Burgundy and Ermengarde Lietaud, count of Maçon, wife of Robert, count of Vermandois
- Adelaide of Italy (931–999), also known as Adelaid of Burgundy, wife of Otto I, Holy Roman Emperor
- Adelaide of Burgundy, Duchess of Brabant (1233–1273), daughter of Hugh IV, Duke of Burgundy and Yolande of Dreux, wife of Henry III, Duke of Brabant
- Adelaide, Countess of Auxerre (1251–1290), daughter of Odo, Count of Nevers and Matilda II, Countess of Nevers, wife of John I of Chalon-Auxerre
