= Carnival of Vinaròs =

Annual festival in Vinaròs, Spain

Carnival of Vinaròs Carnaval de Vinaròs
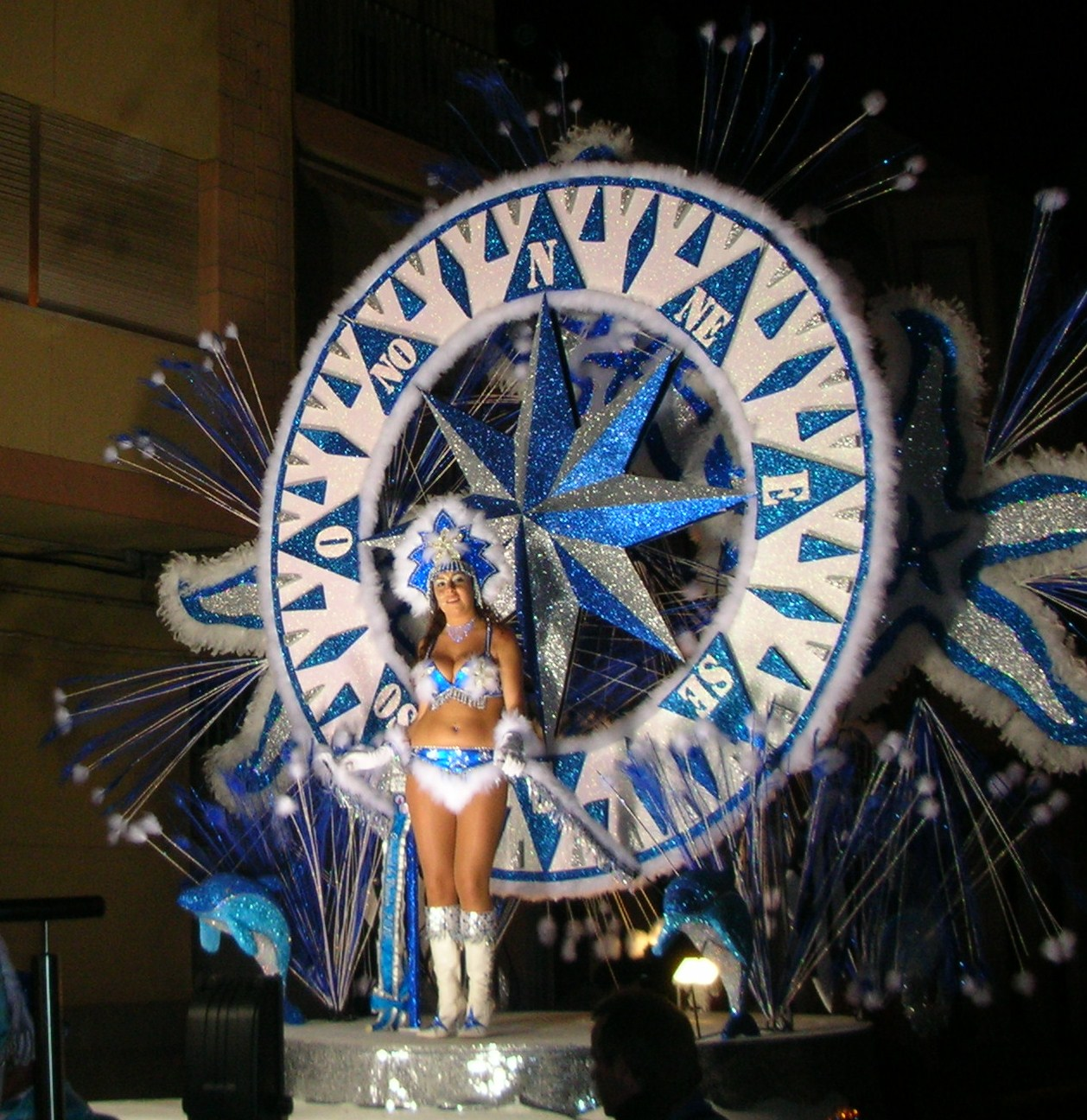
- Ni Fu Ni Fa's queen in Carnival 2010
- Status: Active
- Genre: Festival
- Begins: 29 January 2016
- Ends: 8 February 2016 (11 days)
- Frequency: Annually (Between January, February and March)
- Locations: Vinaròs, Spain
- Participants: 33 troupes
- Major events: Valencian Community's Tourist Interest Festivity (2007)

The Carnival of Vinaròs is an annual festival in Vinaròs, Spain that is held forty days before Lent. In 2007, it was renamed the Valencian Community's Tourist Interest Festivity and it aspires to be Spain's Tourist Interest Festivity. In 2016, it took place from 29 January to 8 February. This event usually takes place between January, February or March. There are 33 troupes, the largest of which comprises 500 people. Each troupe is represented by a queen who creates a costume.

== History ==
According to the documents of the Municipal Archive, the origin of the Carnival of Vinaròs dates back to 1871. A masked dance was held in which fifty reales were collected and presented to the Mayor President of the City Council, Demetrio Ayguals de Izco by Nicolás Bas Rodríguez as charity. There are indications of the spontaneous celebration of the carnival during the times of the second Spanish republic and in 1939 the festivity was banned.

== Comparsas ==
Year	Troupes	Year	Troupes
1983	La Colla	2000	Ja hi som! / Tot dins d'un got
1984	Cherokys / Uiaaa... / Penya València / Tomba i Tomba	2001	Fot-li Canya
1985	Arramba i Clava / Els Povals / Els Xocolaters / Pensat i Fet / Penya Barça.	2005	Locura
1986	El Pilà / Els Dormilons / Les Agüeles / Ni Fu Ni Fa	2007	Poche & Friends
1987	Pan i Toros / I sense un duro / La Morterada / Marxeta 87	2011	Samba pa mi
1988	Tot an orri / Va que xuta.	2012	Xe, quin poc suc
1991	Depressa i Correns / No en volem cap	2013	Ara si que si
1992	Els Mateixos	2014	Esmuvi
1999	Centro Aragonés		

Carnival of Vinaròs' ancient troupes:

- Karting
- Sortim perquè volem
- Jalem y alkatre
- Al lío montepío
- Penya Madrid
- Si no t'agrada no mires
- La casa d'Andalusia
- Me Río de Janeiro
- Los Bituneros
- Ni Pic ni Casso

== Calendar ==
1st day (Friday): in the Town Hall, Carnival starts with a performance decorated with the Carnival's topic (in 2016 "The Circus") and the "Carnestoltes" presentation ("Carnestoltes" is a wood structure of a man dressed in a costume of the Carnival's topic). Then, the mayor and the queens open the Carnival's hut enclosure (placed in the Fóra Forat Walk, with each troupe having a hut).

2nd day (Saturday): The Queen's Presentation, where they show their costumes. It's located on the old football pitch (Boverals H Street / Football Pitch Street, in front of the river).

3rd day (Sunday): Flour's Battle and Disguised Pets Competition in Fóra Forat Walk, placed in the Fóra Forat Walk both.

4th day (Monday): Ederlies' dinner.

5th day (Tuesday): troupes fight to be the winner in a karaoke contest.

6th day (Wednesday): people dress up in thematic costumes in Fóra Forat Walk.

7th day (Thursday): all people dress up in pyjamas for the Fóra Forat Walk.

8th day (Friday): people dress in costumes in Fóra Forat Walk.

9th day (Saturday) and 10th day (Sunday): on Saturday (7 p.m.) and Sunday (6 p.m.), troupes parade around the main streets in a closed route (Calle Pilar, Calle Pablo Ruiz Picaso, Calle San Francisco, Calle País Valencià, Calle Arcipreste Bono, Plaza 1º de Mayo, Calle Costa y Borrás, Calle País Valencià, Calle Arcipreste Bono, Calle Socorro, Plaza Jovellar y Calle Pilar).

11th day (Monday): Carnival ends on the Town Hall, and then the "Carnestoltes" are burned on the beach or on waste ground.

Moreover, in August, there's the Summer Carnival with The Queen's Presentation.
