= Adile =

Adile (IPA: [ɑːdiˈle]) is a Turkish feminine given name. Notable people with the name include:

- Adile Sultan (1826–1899), Ottoman princess, daughter of Sultan Mahmud II
- Adile Sultan (1887–1973), Ottoman princess, daughter of Şehzade Mehmed Selaheddin and granddaughter of Sultan Murad V
- Adile Zogu (1890–1966), sister of King Zog I
- Adile Hanımsultan (1900–1979), Ottoman princess, daughter of Naime Sultan and granddaughter of Sultan Abdülhamid II
- Adile Ayda (1912–1992), Turkish diplomat
- Adile Naşit (1930–1987), Turkish actress

== See also ==
- Adila (name)
