= Adelsohn =

Adelsohn is a surname. Notable people with the surname include:

- Lena Adelsohn Liljeroth (born 1955), Swedish politician, wife of Ulf
- Ulf Adelsohn (born 1941), Swedish politician
- Wolf Adelsohn (died 1866), Russian Hebrew scholar and educator

== See also ==
- Adelson
