= Khamis Al Hammadi =

Emirati association football player (born 1998)

Khamis Al Hammadi خميس الحمادي
Personal information
- Full name: Khamis Saleh Ismaeel Al Hammadi
- Date of birth: 11 August 1998 (age 28)
- Place of birth: Emirates
- Height: 1.65 m (5 ft 5 in)
- Position: Left-back

Team information
- Current team: Baniyas
- Number: 23

Youth career
- –2016: Baniyas

Senior career*
Years	Team	Apps	(Gls)
2016–	Baniyas	17	(0)
- * Club domestic league appearances and goals

Khamis Al Hammadi (Arabic:خميس الحمادي) (born 11 August 1998) is an Emirati footballer. He currently plays as a left back for Baniyas.

== Career ==
Al Hammadi started his career at Baniyas and is a product of the Baniyas's youth system. On 8 May 2015, Al Hammadi made his professional debut for Baniyas against Al Wahda in the Pro League . landed with Baniyas from the UAE Pro League to the UAE First Division League in 2016-17 season. ended up with Baniyas from the UAE First Division League to the UAE Pro League in the 2017-18 season.
