= 28th GCC Champions League =

2013 GCC Champions League
دوري أبطال مجلس التعاون الخليجي

Tournament details
- Dates: 24 October 2012 – 23 May 2013
- Teams: 12 (from AFC/UAFA) confederations)

Final positions
- Champions: (United Arab Emirates) Baniyas (1st title)
- Runners-up: (Qatar) Al-Khor

The 28th GCC Champions League (Arabic: دوري أبطال مجلس التعاون الخليجي) was the 28th edition of the GCC Champions League for clubs of the Gulf Cooperation Council nations, held in 2013.

This edition featured clubs from Saudi Arabia for the first time since 2009.

== Groups ==
Four groups of three teams.

Top two from each group qualify for the one legged quarter finals with group winners hosting the matches.

Group A	Group B	Group C	Group D
(Bahrain) Al Hala ^{1} (Qatar) Al-Khor (Oman) Al-Ittihad	(Saudi Arabia) Najran (Bahrain) Al-Muharraq (Kuwait) Al-Salmiya	(Oman) Al-Shabab (Qatar) Al-Kharitiyat (Kuwait) Kazma	(Saudi Arabia) Al-Faisaly (Bahrain) Busaiteen (United Arab Emirates) Baniyas

^{1} Al Hala replaced Al-Wasl after the group stage draw was completed.

== Group stage ==
=== Group A ===
Team	Pld	W	D	L	GF	GA	GD	Pts
(Qatar) Al-Khor	4	3	1	0	10	3	+7	10
(Oman) Al-Ittihad	4	0	3	1	4	7	−3	3
(Bahrain) Al Hala	4	0	2	2	5	9	−4	2

=== Group B ===
Team	Pld	W	D	L	GF	GA	GD	Pts
(Bahrain) Al-Muharraq	4	3	0	1	7	3	+4	9
(Saudi Arabia) Najran	4	2	0	2	6	6	0	6
(Kuwait) Al-Salmiya	4	1	0	3	1	5	−4	3

=== Group C ===
Team	Pld	W	D	L	GF	GA	GD	Pts
(Qatar) Al-Kharitiyat	4	3	1	0	11	5	+6	10
(Kuwait) Kazma	4	1	1	2	6	7	−1	4
(Oman) Al-Shabab	4	1	0	3	3	8	–5	3

=== Group D ===
Team	Pld	W	D	L	GF	GA	GD	Pts
(Saudi Arabia) Al-Faisaly	4	2	2	0	6	4	+2	8
(United Arab Emirates) Baniyas	4	1	2	1	6	6	0	5
(Bahrain) Busaiteen	4	0	2	2	1	3	−2	2

== Quarter-finals ==
22 April 2013
17:35

Al-Faisaly (Saudi Arabia)	0–2	(Saudi Arabia) Najran
		Al-Dardour 70'; Ayan 82' (pen.)

Prince Salman Bin Abdulaziz Sport City Stadium, Al Majma'ah

23 April 2013
15:45

Al-Muharraq (Bahrain)	1–1	(United Arab Emirates) Baniyas
Ogba 57'		Wilhelmsson 73'
Penalties
Saeed (penalty scored); Al Mishkhas (penalty scored); Abdulhameed (penalty scored); Ali (penalty missed); Jaffer (penalty missed)	3–4	(penalty scored) Abdulrahman; (penalty scored) Jaber; (penalty scored) Mubarak; (penalty scored) Wilhelmsson

Bahrain National Stadium, Riffa
23 April 2013
15:45

Al-Khor (Qatar)	4–1	(Kuwait) Kazma
Awal 20'; Abdu 31'; Madson 40'; Mineiro 80'		Al Fahad 90'

Al-Khor Stadium, Al Khor

24 April 2013
16:00

Al-Kharaitiyat (Qatar)	3–1	(Oman) Al-Ittihad
Al Yazeedi 37'; Al Ansari 46'; Kébé 52'		Saeed 72'

Qatar SC Stadium, Doha

== Semi-finals ==
=== First leg ===
1 May 2013
17:30

Najran (Saudi Arabia)	1–0	(United Arab Emirates) Baniyas
Al Hamsal 52'

Al Akhdoud Club Stadium, Najran

2 May 2013
16:00

Al Kharaitiyat (Qatar)	0–1	(Qatar) Al-Khor
		Bruno Mineiro 52'

Lekhwiya Sports Stadium, Doha

=== Second leg ===
8 May 2013
15:30

Baniyas (United Arab Emirates)	2–0	(Saudi Arabia) Najran
Senghor 18'; Aboutrika 90+5'

Baniyas Stadium, Abu Dhabi

14 May 2013
16:00

Al-Khor (Qatar)	2–1	(Qatar) Al Kharaitiyat

Al-Khawr Stadium, Al Khor

== Final ==
=== First leg ===
17 May 2013
16:00

Al-Khor (Qatar)	1–1	(United Arab Emirates) Baniyas
Bruno Mineiro 9'		Senghor 69'

Al-Khawr Stadium, Al Khor
Referee: Abdulnabi (Bahrain)

=== Second leg ===
23 May 2013
16:00

Baniyas (United Arab Emirates)	2–0	(Qatar) Al-Khor
Aboutrika 26'; Mubarak 80'

Baniyas Stadium, Abu Dhabi
Referee: Al-Awaji (Saudi Arabia)
