= Adel Heinrich =

American composer, organist, and teacher (1926–2022)

Adel Verna Heinrich (July 20, 1926 – August 10, 2022) was an American composer, organist, and university teacher. She taught music at Colby College until her retirement in 1988.

== Personal life and career ==
Born in Cleveland, Ohio, Heinrich graduated from Flora Stone Mather College with a Bachelor of Arts in 1951, and a master's degree in sacred music from the Union Theological Seminary in 1954. She studied the organ with Hugh Porter, John Harvey, E. Power Biggs, Andre Marchal, and Jean Langlais, the harpsichord with Eugenia Earle, and composition with Norman Coke-Jephcott. In 1976, she received a doctorate from the University of Wisconsin–Madison based on her thesis Bach's Die Kunst der Fuge : a living compendium of fugal procedures. Her book Organ and Harpsichord Music by Women Composers was published in 1991. Her compositions for organ include A Carol is Born (a music drama for two sopranos, alto, flute, organ) and the oratorio The Nazarene.

Heinrich taught at Colby College in Waterville, Maine, from 1964 to 1988, where she was associate professor of music and director of chapel music.

Heinrich died on August 10, 2022, at the age of 96.

== Awards ==
Heinrich received the Award of Merit from the National Federation of Music Clubs and the Clemens Award in music. She also received three grants, the Maximum Humanities Travel Grant to use and study old organs in Europe, a Mellon Grant to start a course on Shakespeare and music, and a Humanities Grant for further study into Shakespeare and music. In 2003, Heinrich won the title of the International Musician of the Year by the International Biographical Centre.

Since 2007, the Adel Heinrich Award for Achievement in Musicological Research has been presented to graduate students by Case Western Reserve University which comprises the Flore Stone Mather school where Heinrich studied music.
