= Adel El-Moalem =

Egyptian water polo player (born 1946)

Personal information
- Nationality: Egyptian
- Born: 26 November 1946 (age 78); Cairo, Egypt

Sport
- Sport: Water polo

Adel El-Moalem (born 26 November 1946) is an Egyptian water polo player. He competed at the 1964 Summer Olympics and the 1968 Summer Olympics.
