= Adel Fadaaq =

Emirati footballer (born 1992)

Personal information
- Full name: Adel Abo Baker Fadaaq
- Date of birth: 12 September 1992 (age 34)
- Place of birth: United Arab Emirates
- Height: 1.80 m (5 ft 11 in)
- Position: Goalkeeper

Team information
- Current team: Baniyas
- Number: 33

Youth career
- Al-Wahda

Senior career*
| Years | Team | Apps | (Gls) |
| 2012–2015 | Al-Wahda | 0 | (0) |
| 2015–2018 | Baniyas | 16 | (0) |
| 2018–2021 | Al Jazira | 3 | (0) |
| 2021 | → Al-Nasr (loan) | 0 | (0) |
| 2021–2023 | Al-Nasr | 0 | (0) |
| 2023–2024 | Hatta | 0 | (0) |
| 2023–2024 | → Shabab Al Ahli (loan) | 5 | (0) |
| 2024–2025 | Dibba Al-Hisn | 0 | (0) |
| 2025– | Baniyas | 0 | (0) |
- * Club domestic league appearances and goals

Adel Fadaaq (Arabic: عادل فدعق; born 12 September 1992) is an Emirati footballer. He currently plays for Baniyas as a goalkeeper.
