= Adil Asadov =

Azerbaijani scientist and philosopher (born 1958)

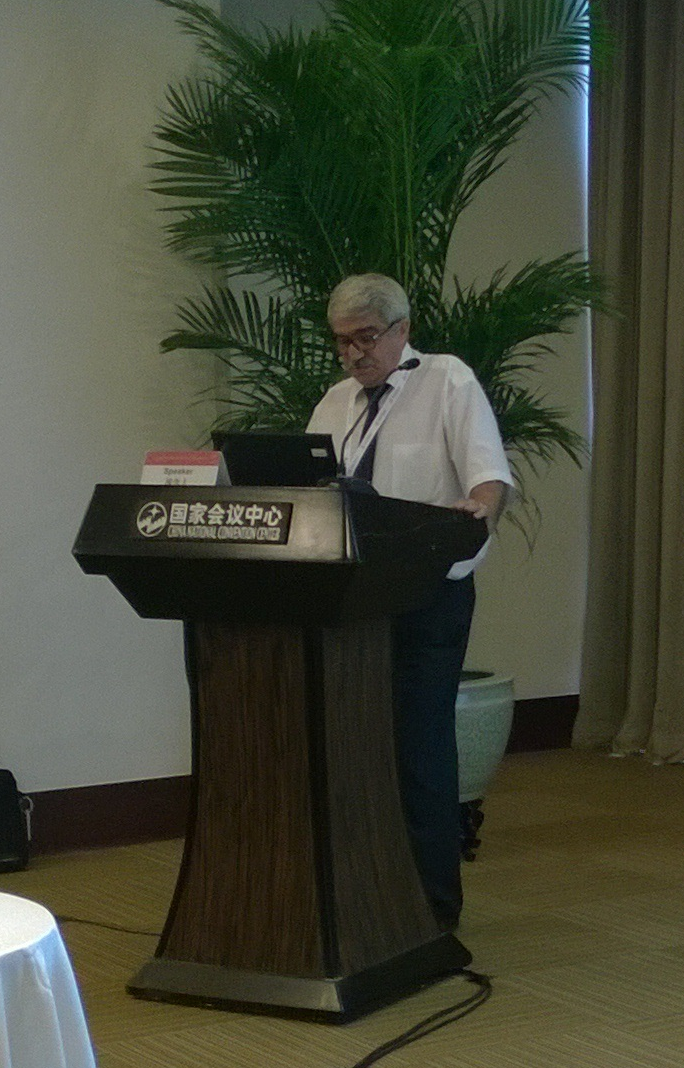
- Adil Asadov at the XXIV World Philosophy Congress, Beijing, China, 2018
- Born: Adil İsgəndər oğlu Əsədov; October 1, 1958 (age 68); Guba, Azerbaijan Republic

Adil Asadov (Azerbaijani: Adil İsgəndər oğlu Əsədov) is an Azerbaijani philosopher, currently head of the department at Azerbaijan National Academy of Sciences and President of Association of Philosophical Enlightenment.

== Biography ==
Adil Asadov was born on October 1, 1958, in Guba, Azerbaijan SSR, USSR. In 1975 he finished Guba boarding school and in 1980 graduated from Azerbaijan University of Architecture and Construction. In 1986 he was admitted to the Aspirantura (postgraduate school) in Philosophy at the Azerbaijan National Academy of Sciences, Institute of Philosophy and Law. He defended his PhD (Candidate of Sciences) thesis titled “Historical types of thinking and engineering activity” in 1989. After completing his postdoctoral research he successfully defended a thesis titled The dynamics of the types of thinking in the context of the system "society and nature"” in 1994. In 2005 he founded the Association of Philosophical Enlightenment. Currently, he is head of the department at the Institute of Philosophy, the Azerbaijan National Academy of Sciences, President of the Association of Philosophical Enlightenment.

== Scientific-pedagogical activity ==
Adil Asadov is the author of more than 170 scientific articles in Azerbaijani, Russian, English and German languages. He has been a participant and lecturer at many international conferences. He gave a speech at international conferences in Baku, Moscow, Minsk, Tbilisi, Belgorod, Bratislava, Athens, Rome, St. Petersburg and Harvard University. He represented the Republic of Azerbaijan at the Second European Social Science Conference (June 13–18, 1998). His speech was published in 1999 in Paris.

After the dissolution of the USSR Adil Asadov is the first Azerbaijani author published in the "Вопросы философии" that is the most influential philosophical journal of post-soviet states. He has translated large-scale works from the world philosophical heritage: the masterpiece by Arthur Schopenhauer “The World as Will and Representation” and "History of Philosophy" by Gunnar Skirbekk and Nils Gilje.

The main direction of his scientific activity is creation of the Philosophical Pentalogy – a philosophical system that is composed of five parts: Philosophy Beauty, Philosophy of Being, Philosophy of Thinking, Moral Philosophy and, Philosophy of Politics.

== Selected publications ==
- 1. Адиль Асадов.Формирование разумных экологических потребностей. - В кн.: Возвышение потребностей и формирование разумных потребностей. Тезисы выступлений участников Всесоюзной научной конференции по проблеме социальных потребностей. Белгород, 2-4 октября 1985 г. М.: ИФАН, 1985, с.41-42
- 2. Адиль Асадов.Способ мышления и инженерная деятельность. В кн.: Научно-технический прогресс: методология, идеология, практика. М.: Центр. совет философских (методологических) семинаров при Президиуме АН СССР, 1989, с.171-178. (с соавторстве с Н.М.Мамедовым).
- 3. Адил Әсәдов. Тәфәккүрүн фәлсәфәси: епохал тәфәккүр ҹәмиjjәтин вә тәбиәтин гаршылыглы мүнасибәтләри контекстиндә (Philosophy of Thinking: epochal Thinking in the context of interaction between society and nature)Б.: Qanun, 1997. – 284с. (in Azerbaijani)
- 4. Adil Asadov. Moslem World and Europe: - Europe: Expectations and Reality. CONCLUSIONS AND RECOMMENDATIONS of the Second European Sosial Science conference EUROPE: Expectations and Reality The Challenge for the Social Sciences Bratislava, 13–18 June 1998. Institute for Sosiology, Slovak Academy of Sciences / Published with the support of UNESCO, Paris, 1999, pp. 318–327
- 5. Adil Əsədov. Siyasətin fəlsəfəsi: dövlət və onun inkişaf mərhələləri siyasi aristokratizmin təkamül dinamikası işığında (Philosophy of Politics: the state and its stages of development in the context of historical dynamics of political aristocraticism). Bakı: Nafta-press, 2001. – 307s. (in Azerbaijani)
- 6. Адиль Асадов. Типы мышления и техника: роль инженерной деятельности в генезисе способов мышления (Types of thinking and technology: the role of engineering activity in the genesis of ways of thinking). Баку: Нафта-пресс, 2002. – 130с. (in Russian)
- 7. Adil Əsədov. Gözəlliyin fəlsəfəsi: mahiyyət və onun cismani təcəssümü spiritualist aristokratizm işığında. (Philosophy of Beauty: Essence and its material embodiment in the light of spiritualistic aristocraticism)B.: Nurlan, 2005, 500 s.(in Azerbaijani)
- 8. Adil Əsədov. Fəlsəfə tarixindən etüdlər: İdeal və reallıq arasında ziddiyyət və onun Qərb, rus və Şərq təfəkküründə həll imkankarı. (Etudes of history of philosophy: the contradiction between the ideal and reality and its ways of solution in Western, Russian and Eastern thinking). Bakı: Təknur, 2007. – 116s. (in Azerbaijani)
- 9. Адиль Асадов. Мышление. Творчество. Эпоха. (Thinking. Creation. Epoch). Баку: Издательство «Текнур», 2009. - 159c. (in Russian)
- 10. Адиль Асадов.Заметки о философском статусе понятия "мышление"// Вопросы философии, 2011, 6. с. 169-172
