= Michael Adelson =

American orchestral conductor

Michael Adelson is an American orchestral conductor. Adelson is a staff and cover conductor for the New York Philharmonic—where he also leads regular clinics and workshops for the orchestra's Department of Education—as well as conductor of the Auros Group for New Music in Boston.

== Biography ==
Trained as a conductor, composer, and cellist, Adelson studied at the New England Conservatory, Mannes College The New School for Music, and the Sibelius Academy in Helsinki. His conducting studies were primarily with renowned conducting pedagogue Jorma Panula, and he graduated summa cum laude from Panula's conducting class at the Sibelius Academy. Adelson has also studied conducting with Michael Tilson Thomas.

Adelson's first major conducting appearance was in 1992, with the Los Angeles Philharmonic, and he has since assisted many conductors including Esa-Pekka Salonen. His other engagements have included The Chamber Music Society of Lincoln Center, Norwegian Chamber Orchestra, Helsinki Philharmonic, Swedish Radio Symphony Orchestra, and New Jersey Symphony Orchestra. As conductor of the Auros Group for New Music, Adelson's recordings have been heard on Albany Records, Swedish Radio, and Finnish Radio. He has been a guest conductor and lecturer at Connecticut College, Helsinki University, Harvard University, Brandeis University, Accademia di Musica in Sassini, Italy, Rencontres Musicales Europeenes in France, and Orkester Norden in Finland.

Equally at home in the opera house, Adelson has led Scandinavian productions of Puccini's Turandot and La Bohème, Mozart's Der Schauspieldirektor, and, in Stockholm, the world premiere of Qu Xiao-Song's Oedipus. He has also assisted Esa-Pekka Salonen for Messiaen's St. Francois d'Assise at the Salzburg Festival. Adelson frequently makes guest-conducting appearances with new music ensembles, including Speculum Musicae, Locrian Chamber Players, Dinosaur Annex, and the Fromm Players at Harvard. He has led world premieres at the Venice Biennale and the Ultima Contemporary Music Festival in Oslo, and has conducted new American music in Europe and Asia as well as in the United States. Adelson, an active composer himself, is a founding member of the Present Eye, an organization dedicated to experimental music and art.

Adelson regularly leads workshops and clinics in conducting and orchestral technique for music educators, as well as for student musicians and ensembles, sponsored by the New York Philharmonic and the Manhattan School of Music. As the principal conductor of the first annual Rencontres Musicales Europeenes in France, he led a festival orchestra that included students from France, Germany, Italy, and the Czech Republic. Adelson was also Music Director of Gemini Youth Orchestras from 2003 to 2005, where he led performances at Carnegie Hall. He has written and conducted youth concerts with the Helsinki Philharmonic, Los Angeles Philharmonic, and New Jersey Symphony Orchestra.

== Sources ==
- New York Philharmonic. Michael Adelson
- Mannes College The New School for Music. https://web.archive.org/web/20100806202732/http://www.newschool.edu/mannes/facultyPreparatoryDivision.aspx?mid=11574 Faculty profile: Michael Adelson
- Gemini Youth Orchestra
- NYU Steinhardt
