= Joan Elies Adell i Pitarch =

Catalan-language poet and essayist

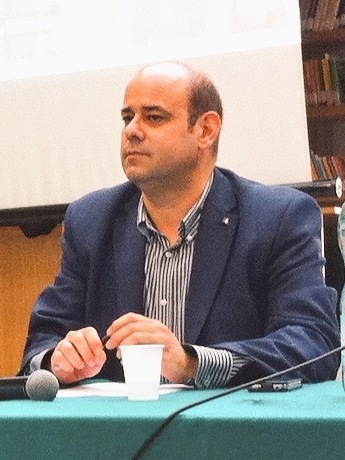

Joan Elies Adell i Pitarch (born 1968) is a Catalan-language poet and essayist.

== Biography ==
Joan Elies Adell was born in Vinaròs, Baix Maestrat, Castellón Province, Valencian Community. A graduate in audiovisual communication with a doctorate in Catalan philology, he is a professor of philology at the Open University of Catalonia in Barcelona, and of literary theory at Rovira i Virgili University in Tarragona. At present, he is the Director of "Espai Llull", Office of the Government of Catalonia in the Sardinian city of Alghero.

He has written on literary theory, cultural theory, Catalan literature and music, and is part of Hermeneia, a research project at the Open University of Catalonia, dedicated to the investigation of the relationships between new technologies and literary studies.

== Poetry ==
- La matèria del temps (1994)
- Ocèa immobil (1995)
- A curt termini (In the Short Term, 1997)
- Un mateix cel (A similar sky, 2000)
- Encara una olor, which won the Alfons el Magnànim prize, 2003)
- La degradacio natural dels objectes (The natural degradation of objects, for which he won a prize at the Jocs Florals literary competition in Barcelona in 2004).
- Pistes falses (False Clues, 2006) for which he won the Màrius Sampere prize

== Essays ==
- Notes per a una redefinicio dels estudis literaris catalans (Notes for a redefinition of Catalan literary studies), 1996, which won the Alambor prize)
- Mètodes i ideologia en la historiografia de la literatura catalana (Methods and ideology in the historiography of Catalan literature), which won a prize from the Association for the Promotion of Catalan Culture in 1997
- Musica i simulacre a l’era digital (Music and simulacra in the digital age, 1997)
