= Adil Nurmemet =

Chinese politician

- ئادىل نۇرمەمەت

Mayor of Hotan
- In office January 2009 – October 2014
- Succeeded by: Rashati Mushajiang (热夏提·木沙江)

Personal details
- Born: February 1968 (age 58) Hotan, Xinjiang, China
- Party: Chinese Communist Party (1989–2015; expelled)

Chinese name
- Traditional Chinese: 阿迪力·努爾買買提
- Simplified Chinese: 阿迪力·努尔买买提
Transcriptions
Standard Mandarin
- Hanyu Pinyin: Ādílì Nǔĕrmaǐmaǐtí

Adil Nurmemet (Uyghur: ئادىل نۇرمەمەت; born February 1968) is a former Chinese politician of Uyghur ethnicity. He was the Mayor of Hotan, an important city in the Xinjiang interior, between 2009 and 2013. He was investigated by the Central Commission for Discipline Inspection in October 2014.

== Career ==
Adili Nurmemet was born and raised in Hotan, Xinjiang.

He joined the Chinese Communist Party (CCP) in June 1989 and got involved in politics in July 1989.

In January 2009, he was appointed the Mayor and Deputy Communist Party Secretary of Hotan (the county-level city, not the eponymous prefecture), he remained in that position until October 2014, when he was being investigated by the Central Commission for Discipline Inspection for "serious violations of laws and regulations".

Adili was expelled from the CCP on February 17, 2015. On June 19, he was indicted on suspicion of accepting bribes. The public prosecutors accused him of abusing his multiple positions between 2007 and 2013 in Hotan to seek favor on behalf of certain organizations and individuals in settlement of project funds, land development and real estate construction. In return, he took bribes of more than 6.44 million yuan ($989,440).

He was sentenced to 12 years for accepting bribes about 6.44 million yuan ($989,440).

Government offices
Preceded by ?	Mayor of Hotan; 2009–2014	Succeeded by Rashati Mushajiang
