= Adel Sabeel =

Emirati footballer (born 1998)

Personal information
- Full name: Adel Sabeel Moosa Shahin Sarfash
- Date of birth: 1 February 1998 (age 28)
- Place of birth: United Arab Emirates
- Height: 1.73 m (5 ft 8 in)
- Position: Left back

Team information
- Current team: Hatta
- Number: 23

Youth career
- Al Shabab

Senior career*
Years	Team	Apps	(Gls)
2016–2017	Al Shabab	4	(0)
2017–2019	Shabab Al-Ahli	0	(0)
2017–2018	→ Al-Wahda (loan)	0	(0)
2018	→ Dibba Al-Fujairah (loan)	3	(0)
2018–2019	→ Dibba Al-Fujairah (loan)	2	(0)
2019–2025	Khor Fakkan	71	(0)
2024–2025	→ Al Urooba (loan)	8	(0)
2025–	Hatta	0	(0)
- * Club domestic league appearances and goals

Adel Sabeel (Arabic :عادل سبيل) (born 1 February 1998) is an Emirati footballer. He currently plays for Hatta.
