= Adel Al-Hammadi =

Emirati footballer (born 1991)

Personal information
- Full name: Adel Salem Al-Hammadi
- Date of birth: 7 December 1991 (age 34)
- Place of birth: United Arab Emirates
- Height: 1.69 m (5 ft 6 1/2 in)
- Position: Left back

Youth career
- Al Ahli

Senior career*
Years	Team	Apps	(Gls)
2011–2017	Al Ahli	4	(0)
2012–2015	→ Ajman (loan)	45	(0)
2017–2018	Dibba Al-Fujairah	16	(0)
2018–2019	Ittihad Kalba	4	(0)
2022–2023	Al-Hamriyah		
- * Club domestic league appearances and goals

Adel Al-Hammadi (Arabic:عادل الحمادي) (born 7 December 1991) is an Emirati footballer who plays as a left back .
