= Adel Zawati =

Palestinian politician

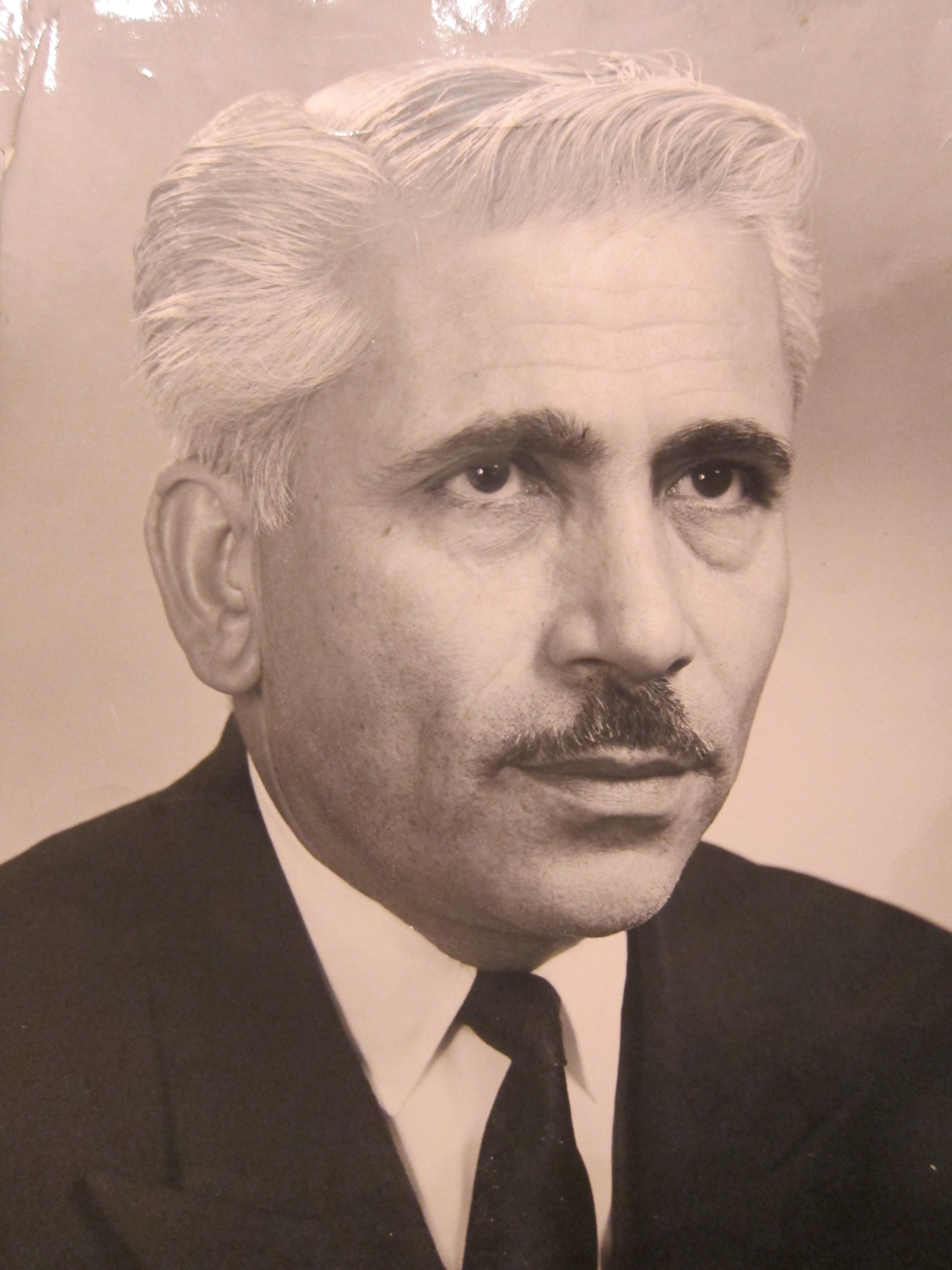

Member of the Parliament of Jordan
- In office 1982–1984
- Constituency: Nablus

Mayor of Jenin
- In office 1961–?

Mayor of Hebron
- In office ?–?

Mayor of Irbid
- In office ?–?

Personal details
- Born: 1920 Zawata, Nablus
- Died: 1984 (aged 63–64)
- Education: American University of Beirut
- Occupation: Politician

Adel Zawati (Arabic: عادل زواتي; born Zawata, Nablus, 1920; died 1984) was a Palestinian politician.

== Biography ==
Adel Zawati was born 1920 in Zawata, Nablus to Palestinian parents. His father, Abd el Rahman, as well as his brother, Najeeb Zawati, were both Islamic scholars and graduates of Al-Azhar University in Cairo, the oldest Islamic university in the world.

He was educated in Nablus schools and The Friends Boys School near Jerusalem before he went on to receive his bachelor's and master's degrees with honors in Arabic Literature from the American University of Beirut (AUB) in 1945. Zawati was, at various times, appointed as head (حاكم)of the cities of Lydda, then Ramla and Jaffa under the British Mandate.

He later moved to Jerusalem to work as secretary to the British High Commissioner in Jerusalem. He was taken prisoner by Israeli forces during the 1948 Palestine Israeli war and was later released in a prisoner exchange.

Zawati subsequently served as mayor of Jenin in 1961, and later as mayor of Hebron and Irbid. He later worked for the Jordanian state Radio and television Institute, and in various other positions, the United Nations and the Arab world before being elected in 1982 to the Parliament of Jordan representing the city of Nablus.
