= Tama Home =

Japanese Housing Company

TamaHome
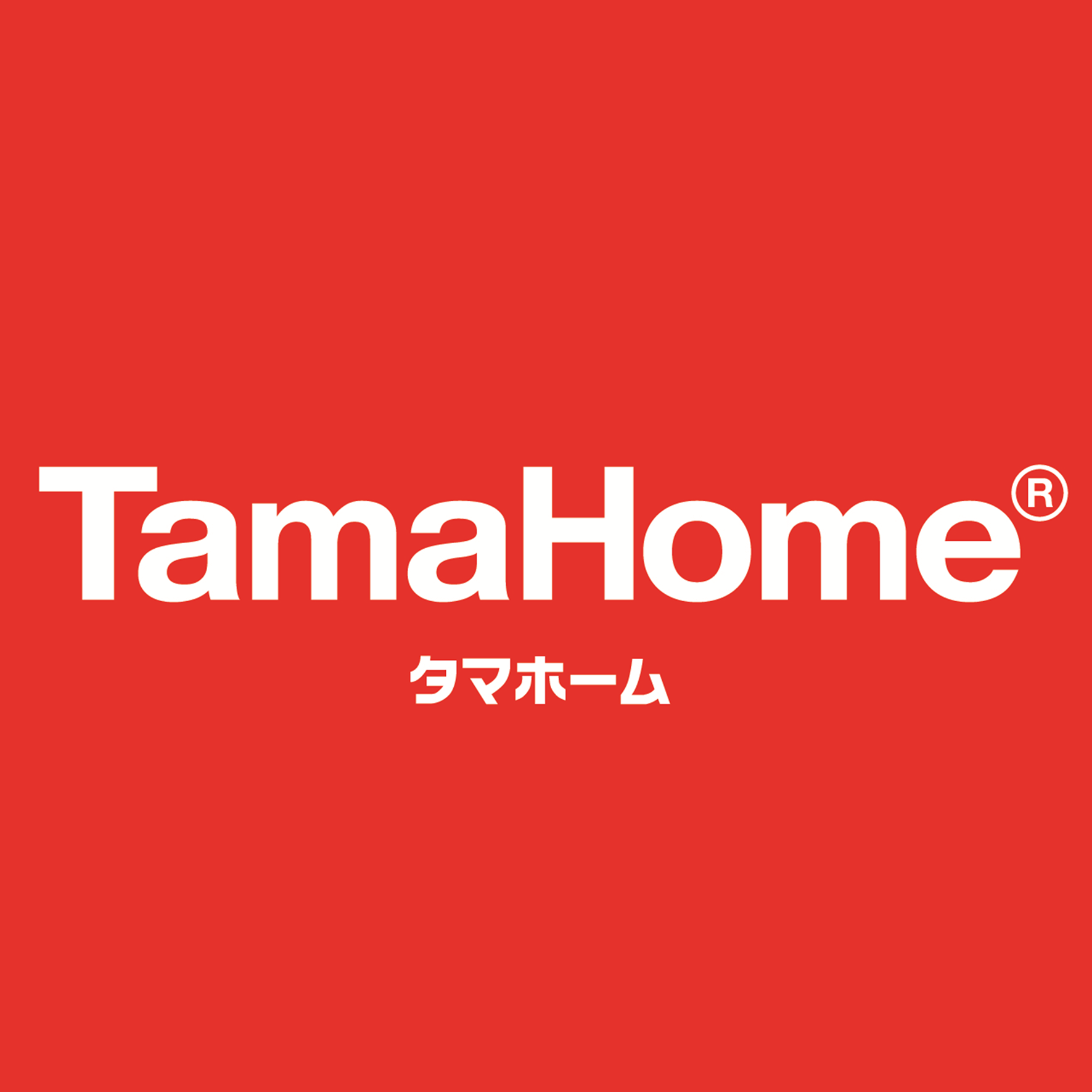
- Happy Life, Happy Home
- Native name: タマホーム
- Romanized name: Tamahōmu
- Company type: Private
- Industry: Conglomerate
- Founded: 1998
- Headquarters: Minato, Takanawa, 3-chōme−22−9, Tokyo
- Key people: Shinya Tamaki (CEO); Yasuhiro Tamaki (chairman)
- Services: Architecture, design, real estate
- Number of employees: 3300+ (2025)
- Subsidiaries: Tama Ad Co., Ltd. Tama Finance Co., Ltd. Tamariving Inc. Tamaagro; Tama Hotels Co., Ltd. Resident Business Co., Ltd. Tama Food International Co., Ltd. (TamaOne); Kyushu New Energy Organization Co., Ltd. Tama Apparel Co., Ltd. Tama Home Real Estate Co., Ltd. TH Auto Lease Co., Ltd. Kakehashi Tama Home Development Co., Ltd. Tama Son Thanh Vietnam Joint Company; Tama Global Investments Pte. Ltd. Tama Home(Cambodia)Ltd. Tama Home AMERICA LLC
- Website: www.tamahome.jp/

TamaHome Co.Ltd. (タマホーム株式会社, Tamahōmu kabushiki kaisha), also known simply as TamaHome (タマホーム, Tamahōmu), is a Japanese housing company. Originally established on June 3, 1998. it is part of the JPX-Nikkei Mid and Small Cap Index as 2021.

Initially, its headquarters were in Fukuoka City, with operations primarily centered in the Kyushu region. In June 2004, it opened an Osaka headquarters (now the Kansai Regional Headquarters). In June 2005, a Tokyo headquarters, the Tokyo headquarters later became the company's registered head office, thus expanding its operations nationwide.

Currently (as of 2025), it employes over 3300 people overall.
