= Arthur Adel =

American astronomer and astrophysicist (1908–1994)

- Born: November 22, 1908; Brooklyn, New York, U.S.
- Died: September 13, 1994 (aged 85); Flagstaff, Arizona, U.S.
- Occupations: Astronomer, astrophysicist

Arthur Adel (November 22, 1908 – September 13, 1994) was an American astronomer and astrophysicist. His research focused on atmospheric Spectrography. He worked at Lowell Observatory from 1936 until 1942 and was for many years a professor at what is now Northern Arizona University, both in Flagstaff, Arizona.

== Early life and education ==
Adel was born in Brooklyn, New York. His parents were Orthodox Jews who had immigrated from Russia and Poland. The family later moved to Detroit, where he graduated from a technical high school. He worked as a machinist for a year before attending the University of Michigan at Ann Arbor, where he earned a bachelor's degree in mathematics and physics in 1931 and in 1933 a PhD with a dissertation on "The Infrared Spectrum and the Structure of the Carbon Dioxide Molecule".

== Career ==
Beginning in 1933, he did research at the Lowell Observatory, demonstrating that the harmonics of the vibration of methane and ammonia molecules gave rise to the absorption bands observed in planetary atmospheres, and later publishing extensively on the water-vapor-related parameters in Earth's atmosphere. In 1935–36 he was a postdoctoral research fellow at Johns Hopkins University. During World War II, he worked for the US Navy in Washington, DC, de-gaussing submarines, and from 1942 to 1946 was a faculty member in physics at the University of Michigan. From 1946 to 1948 he was an assistant professor at the McMath-Hulbert Solar Observatory, then operated by the university, while also studying the effective radiation temperature of the ozone layer for the US Air Force at a base in New Mexico. In 1948 he was appointed professor of mathematics at Arizona State College, now Northern Arizona University, where he founded the Atmospheric Research Observatory, which had the first specially designed infrared telescope. Among other achievements, he discovered the 20 micron window in the Earth's atmosphere and proved observationally that the Moon radiates as a black body. He retired and was named professor emeritus in 1976. The university has named a mathematics building and the Arthur Adel Award, given annually since 1995 to a researcher who furthers the goals of science, in his honor; his papers are kept at the university.

== Personal life and death ==
Adel married Catherine Backus in 1935; they did not have children. He died of cancer on September 13, 1994, in Flagstaff, at the age of 85.
