= Adel Abo Hassoon =

Syrian television actor and voice actor

- عادل أبو حسون
- Born: 30 July 1970 (age 56); Beirut, Lebanon
- Occupations: Actor, voice actor
- Years active: 1995–present
- Spouse: Amnah Omar

Adel Abo Hassoon (Arabic: عادل أبو حسون; born 30 July 1970) is a Syrian television actor and voice actor.

== Early life ==
Abo Hassoon was born in Beirut, Lebanon and has worked with Venus Center for dubbing since 1995 in many animated series. He is married to actress Amnah Omar and has three daughters.

== Filmography ==
=== Television ===
- Rijal al hasm
- ma malakt aimanokm
- al faoaris

=== Dubbing roles ===
- Slam Dunk – Hanamichi Sakuragi
- Fist of the North Star – Rei
- Pokemon – Meowth, Seymour
- Inuyasha – Inuyasha
- One Piece – Usopp, Portgas D. Ace
- Detective Conan
- Fushigi Yugi – Tamahome
- The Looney Tunes Show – Porky Pig (Syrian dub)
- Iron Kid – Buttons
- Animaniacs – Dr. Otto Scratchansniff
- Digimon Adventure 02 – Yamato Ishida
- Naruto – Gaara
- Justice League – Green Lantern
- The Scooby-Doo Show
- Super Robot Monkey Team Hyperforce Go! – Chiro
- A.T.O.M. – Axel Manning
- Monster Rancher – General Durahan
- Doraemon – Takeshi "Gian" Goda
- W.I.T.C.H.
- Bartok the Magnificent – Zozi
- Scan2Go – Shiro Shibakusa
- Vicky the Viking
- Yo-Kai Watch – Whisper
- The Powerpuff Girls (Venus dub)
- Dragon Ball: Mystical Adventure – Crane Hermit, Korin
- Dragon Ball Z – Raditz, Captain Ginyu
- Dragon Ball Super – Zuno, Khai, Rumsshi
- Hunter x Hunter – Todo
- Kuroko's Basketball – Taisuke Otsubo
- Hurricanes (TV series) – Coach Jock Stone
