= Adel Ismail (historian) =

Lebanese diplomat and historian (1928–2010)

Permanent Representative of Lebanon to the UNESCO
- In office 1985–1990

Ambassador of Lebanon to Morocco
- In office 1978–1985

Personal details
- Born: 18 January 1928 Dulhoun, Lebanon
- Died: July 2010 (aged 82)
- Education: Sorbonne University

Adel Ismail (1928–2010) was a Lebanese diplomat and historian. He was the ambassador of Lebanon to Morocco between 1978 and 1985 and the permanent representative of Lebanon to the UNESCO between 1985 and 1990. He is known for being the author of various books on the history of Lebanon.

== Early life and education ==
Ismail was born in Dulhoun on 18 January 1928. He hailed from a Sunni Muslim family based in Iqlim al-Kharrub, Mount Lebanon. He was a graduate of the Sorbonne University where he received both an undergraduate degree and a Ph.D. in law. One of his teachers was Maurice Chehab.

== Career ==
Following his graduation Ismail worked at the Ministry of Education as an inspector and was the deputy director general between 1956 and 1959. Then he joined the Ministry of Foreign Affairs and held various diplomatic posts, including counsellor in Madrid from 1960 to 1963. Then he served as consul general of Lebanon in Italy between 1964 and 1967, in Sudan and Ethiopia between February 1967 and 1969 and in Saudi Arabia between 1969 and 1971. He was the director of political affairs at the Lebanese Central Administration from 1971 to 1978.

Ismail was appointed ambassador of Lebanon to Morocco in 1978 and remained in post until 1985. Next he was named as permanent representative of Lebanon to the UNESCO in 1985 which he held until 1990.

=== Work ===
Ismail authored more than seventy books and owned a publishing company. He was the first scholar who systematically analyzed the French diplomatic archives. The documents were published in the period between 1974 and 1994 in 41 volumes. He also employed materials from the British diplomatic archives in his studies. One of his books was translated into English in 1972 under the title Lebanon: History of a People. His extensive study on the history of Maronites in Lebanon was published in February 2000.

== Death ==
Ismail died in July 2010.

== Awards ==
Ismail was twice recipient of the Lebanese Order of Cedar (Knight and Commander). He was named as a Laureate of the French Academy in 1965 and was awarded with the Cardinal Richelieu Medal by the French Academy. He was also awarded the Prize of the French Academy in 1956 and 1989.
