= Adila Shakhtakhtinskaya =

Azerbaijani obstetrician-gynecologist

- Born: 17 April 1894; Tiflis, Russian Empire
- Died: 30 March 1951 (aged 56); Tiflis, USSR
- Known for: the first Azerbaijani woman to become a doctor of medical sciences and a professor
- Scientific career
- Fields: Gynaecology
- Institutions: Azerbaijan Medical University

Adila Isasultan gizi Shakhtakhtinskaya (Azerbaijani: Adilə İsasultan qızı Şahtaxtinskaya) (17 April 1894, in Tiflis, Russian Empire – 30 March 1951 in Tiflis, USSR) was an Azerbaijani Soviet obstetrician-gynecologist, doctor of medical sciences (1930), professor (1936). The first Azerbaijani woman to become a doctor of medical sciences and a professor.

== Life ==
Adila Shakhtakhtinskaya was born on April 17, 1894, in the city of Tiflis in the family of a publicist and collegiate adviser Isasultan Shakhtakhtinsky. In 1930, Shakhtakhtinskaya received the degree of doctor of medical sciences, and in 1936 - the academic title of professor, thus becoming the first Azerbaijani woman to become a doctor of medical sciences and a professor. Since 1933, Shakhtakhtinskaya headed the Department of Obstetrics and Gynecology of the Azerbaijan State Medical Institute (now the Azerbaijan Medical University). Adila Shakhtakhtinskaya was one of the first women to head a department in Azerbaijan. The study of Adila Shakhtakhtinskaya was mainly associated with problems of feminine hygiene, the effect of excised fruits on the ovaries, and eclampsia. Adila Shakhtakhtinskaya died on March 30, 1951, in Tiflis. She was buried in the old Muslim cemetery in Tiflis (now the Pantheon of prominent Azerbaijanis is located here on the territory of the National Botanical Garden of Georgia). Her name is engraved on a monument erected on the territory of the pantheon.
