= Adel Al-Ghamdi =

Saudi businessman

CFA Adel Saleh Al-Ghamdi

CEO of Tadawul, Saudi Stock Exchange
- In office 1 August 2013 – 11 November 2015
- Succeeded by: Khalid Abdullah Al Hussan

Personal details
- Born: Adel Saleh Al-Ghamdi Saudi Arabia

Adel Saleh Al-Ghamdi is a Saudi businessman and the former chief executive officer of the Saudi Stock Exchange (Tadawul), former chairman of the Arab Federation of Exchanges.

== Background ==
He has worked for Riyad Bank Europe, Riyad Bank London, HSBC Saudi Arabia, and Capital Market Authority. He has been on the board of the Tadawul Real Estate Company and is the chairman of the Arab Federation of Exchanges.

From April 2016 to April 2017, he was a Group CEO at Alissa Group, a Saudi conglomerate.

He was the Chief Executive of the Saudi Stock Exchange (Tadawul) from August 1, 2013 to November 11, 2015.
