= Adel El-Sharkawy =

Egyptian handball player

Adel El-Sharkawy (born October 27, 1966) is an Egyptian handball player. He competed for Egypt's national team at the 1992 Summer Olympics.
