= Adel Al-Anezi =

Kuwaiti footballer

Personal information
- Date of birth: 6 February 1977 (age 49)
- Position: Midfielder

Senior career*
Years	Team	Apps	(Gls)
1997–2006	Kuwait SC		

International career
2000–2003	Kuwait		
- * Club domestic league appearances and goals

Adel Al-Anezi (born 6 February 1977) is a Kuwaiti former footballer. He competed in the men's tournament at the 2000 Summer Olympics.
