= Adel Khechini =

Tunisian volleyball player (born 1964)

Personal information
- Nationality: Tunisian
- Born: 14 February 1964 (age 61)

Sport
- Sport: Volleyball

Adel Khechini (born 14 February 1964) is a Tunisian volleyball player. He competed in the men's tournament at the 1984 Summer Olympics.
