= Adel Langue =

Mauritian footballer

Personal information
- Full name: Jean Anderson Adel Bruano Langue
- Date of birth: 17 September 1997 (age 29)
- Place of birth: Quatre Bornes, Mauritius
- Height: 1.70 m (5 ft 7 in)
- Position: Midfielder

Team information
- Current team: CA Vitry

Senior career*
Years	Team	Apps	(Gls)
2014–2018	Cercle de Joachim		
2018	Paris FC	0	(0)
2018–2019	Deportivo Alavés	0	(0)
2019–2020	CA Vitry		
2020–2021	Lusitano	12	(1)
2021–2022	CA Vitry		
2022–2023	Red Star FC		
2023–	CA Vitry		

International career^{‡}
2015–	Mauritius	46	(0)
- * Club domestic league appearances and goals as of 20:36, 16 June 2025 (UTC) ‡ National team caps and goals as of 20:36, 16 June 2025 (UTC)

Jean Anderson Adel Bruano Langue (born 17 September 1997) is a Mauritian international footballer who plays for French club CA Vitry as a midfielder.

== Club career ==
Born in Quatre Bornes, he began his career with Cercle de Joachim. In 2018 he signed for French club Paris FC, and in August 2018 he signed for Spanish club Deportivo Alavés.

He later played for CA Vitry, Lusitano, and Red Star FC.

== International career ==
He made his international debut for Mauritius in 2015.
