= Adel Omar Sherif =

Egyptian politician and judge

Justice Dr. Dr. h.c. Adel Omar Sherif is the Deputy Chief Justice of the Supreme Constitutional Court of Egypt and a Distinguished Visiting Professor of Law at the Dedman School of Law, Southern Methodist University Dallas, USA.

Throughout his career, he has been affiliated with a number of academic institutions, including the Human Rights Law Centre of the College of Law, DePaul University in Chicago, Human Rights Center of the University of Essex, U.K., the Federal Judicial Center in Washington, D.C., the Faculty of Law at McGill University in Montreal, Quebec, Canada and others.

At the international level, and through his membership of and interaction with a number of concerned international organisations, academic institutions and forums, he has contributed considerably to the development of the international judicial cooperation movement, notably in the areas of constitutional judiciary, environmental law, family law and international child abduction. Justice Sherif has written and published widely on a variety of legal issues, including human rights law, constitutional law, Islamic law, and environmental law.

His works include:

- Human Rights and Democracy: The Role of the Supreme Constitutional Court of Egypt, by Kevin Boyle and Adel Omar Sherif (eds.), 1997
- The Role of the Judiciary in the Protection of Human Rights, by International Conference on the Role of the Judiciary in the Protection of Human Rights, Eugene Cotran and Adel Omar Sherif (eds.), 1997
- Democracy, the Rule of Law and Islam, by University of London Centre of Islamic and Middle Eastern Law, Eugene Cotran and Adel Omar Sherif (eds.), 1999
- Criminal Justice in Islam: Judicial Procedure in the Shari'a, by Muhammad Abdel Haleem, Kate Daniels and Adel Omar Sherif (eds.), 2003
- "The Relation between Constitution and Shari'ah in Egypt", in Constitutionalism in Islamic Countries: Between Upheaval and Continuity, Oxford University Press, Oxford / New York, 2011 (Rainer Grote / Tilmann Röder, eds.).
