= Adel Humoud =

Kuwaiti footballer

Personal information
- Full name: Adel Humoud Al Shammari
- Date of birth: June 20, 1986 (age 40)
- Place of birth: Kuwait City, Kuwait
- Position: Midfielder

Youth career
- Al Jahra

Senior career*
Years	Team	Apps	(Gls)
2003–2010	Al Jahra		
2007–2008	→ Al Shamal (loan)		
2008–2009	→ Al Qadsia (loan)		
2010	NK Jedinstvo Bihać		
2011	Muscat		
2011–2012	Al Qadsia	7	(0)
2012–2015	Al Naser		
2015–2016	Qadsia SC		
Total		?	(?)

International career^{‡}
2006–2007	Kuwait U21	8	(1)
2008	Kuwait	4	(0)
- * Club domestic league appearances and goals as of January 26, 2011 ‡ National team caps and goals as of January 26, 2011

Adel Humoud (Arabic: عادل حمود, born 20 June 1986) is a Kuwaiti footballer who is a midfielder.
