= Adel Nefzi =

Tunisian footballer

Personal information
- Full name: Adel Nefzi
- Date of birth: March 16, 1974 (age 52)
- Place of birth: Béja, Tunisia
- Height: 1.83 m (6 ft 0 in)
- Position: Goalkeeper

Youth career
- Olympique de Béja

Senior career*
Years	Team	Apps	(Gls)
1994–2005	Olympique de Béja	58	(0)
2005–2007	US Monastir	30	(0)
2007–2011	Club Africain	37	(0)
Total		125	(0)

International career
2006–2010	Tunisia	3	(0)
- * Club domestic league appearances and goals

Adel Nefzi (Arabic: عادل النفزي) (born 16 March 1974 in Béja) is a retired Tunisian football player who played as a goalkeeper.

Nefzi originally played for the Olympique de Béja before moving to the US Monastir and then to the Club Africain. He was called up to the Tunisia national team for the 2006 World Cup as a back-up goalkeeper and did not appear in any matches.
