= Adel Rootstein =

British mannequin designer

- Адель Рутштейн
- Born: 15 September 1930; Warmbaths, Union of South Africa
- Died: 20 September 1992 (aged 62); London, UK
- Other names: Adel Hopkins
- Occupations: Mannequin designer; visual merchandiser
- Organisation: Adel Rootstein
- Spouse: Richard Hopkins (m. 1953)

Adel Rootstein (married name Adel Hopkins; Russian: Адель Рутштейн; 15 September 1930 – 20 September 1992) was a South African-born British mannequin designer, visual merchandiser and founder of the Adel Rootstein mannequin company.

== Early life ==
Adel Rootstein was born on 15 September 1930 in Warmbaths, Union of South Africa (present-day Bela-Bela, South Africa) to Russian parents.

== Career ==
In 1951, at age 21, Rootstein relocated to London to work as a visual merchandiser and window dresser for Aquascutum. Rootstein later worked as a mannequin wig maker.

In the late 1956, Rootstein founded her mannequin business 'Adel Rootstein' alongside her husband Richard Hopkins, an industrial designer. She first hired sculptor John Taylor and model Imogen for her first mannequin, placed in a reclining position. This was the start of her first collection, called "GoGo". Her sources of inspiration expanded to music and clubs. In 1959, Rootstein established a factory in London to manufacture her fibreglass mannequins.

Rootstein has been called the "Rolls-Royce" of mannequin makers, and later used well-known singers and actresses as models for her mannequins; Cher, Joan Collins and Twiggy among them.

In 1991, 'Adel Rootstein' was sold to the Japanese mannequin manufacturer Yoshichu, a frequent collaborator of Rootstein. Following the sale of the business, Rootstein enrolled at the Slade School of Fine Art.

=== Rootstein Hopkins Foundation ===
In 1990, Rootstein and her husband Rick Hopkins set up the Rootstein Hopkins Foundation to assist young artists and designers.

== Personal life ==
In 1953, Rootstein married Richard 'Rick' Hopkins (1927-2000) in Kensington.

Rootstein died on 20 September 1992 in London aged 62.

== Legacy ==
Rootstein's mannequins were used for the Miu Miu Pre-Fall 2017 presentation.
