= Adel Belal =

Egyptian footballer (born 1987)

Adel El Siwi
Personal information
- Full name: Adel Belal Mohamed Diab
- Date of birth: June 27, 1987 (age 39)
- Place of birth: Egypt
- Position: Left back

Team information
- Current team: El Gouna (on loan from El Raja SC)
- Number: 3

Senior career*
| Years | Team | Apps | (Gls) |
| –2012 | El Raja SC | | |
| 2012–2015 | Tala'ea El Gaish | 31 | (1) |
| 2015– | El Raja SC | | |
| 2018– | → El Gouna (loan) | | |
- * Club domestic league appearances and goals as of 16 August 2017

Adel Belal Mohamed Diab (Arabic: عادل بلال; born June 27, 1987), also known as Adel El Siwi, is an Egyptian professional footballer who currently plays as a left back for the Egyptian club El Gouna FC on loan from El Raja SC.
