= Adel Ahmed Malalla =

Qatari footballer (born 1961)

Personal information
- Date of birth: 15 September 1961 (age 65)
- Place of birth: Doha, Qatar
- Height: 1.72 m (5 ft 8 in)
- Position: Defender

Senior career*
Years	Team	Apps	(Gls)
1980–1992	Al Ahli		

International career
1979–1992	Qatar		
- * Club domestic league appearances and goals

Adel Ahmed Malalla (born 15 September 1961) is a former Qatari footballer. He competed in the men's tournament at the 1984 Summer Olympics.

== Club career ==
Malalla played for Al Ahli throughout his entire career, helping them win several Emir Cup titles.

== International career ==
Malalla was selected in 1979 for the Qatar national team, becoming a starter for the 1982 Gulf Cup, In 1984, Malalla helped Qatar reach the 1984 Gulf Cup final, the same year he played at the 1984 Olympics and the 1984 Asian Cup.

He was present at the 1986 World Cup qualifiers. In 1988, he featured in the 1988 Asian Cup and last played in the 1992 Gulf Cup.

== Legacy ==
Mallala would be an instrumental part of Al Ahli's success. Playing a key role in winning the Emir Cup for them several times. To honour his legacy, for the FIFA U-17 World Cup, the Aspire Zone Pitch 9 was chosen to be named after him.
