= Adel Ibrahim Ismail =

Egyptian basketball player

Personal information
- Nationality: Egyptian
- Born: 28 March 1951 (age 73)

Sport
- Sport: Basketball

Adel Ibrahim Ismail (born 28 March 1951) is an Egyptian basketball player. He competed in the men's tournament at the 1972 Summer Olympics.
