= Adel Abdullah =

Syrian footballer (born 1984)

Personal information
- Full name: Adel Ahmed Abdullah
- Date of birth: 12 January 1984 (age 42)
- Place of birth: Damascus, Syria
- Height: 1.80 m (5 ft 11 in)
- Position: Midfielder

Team information
- Current team: Sur
- Number: 41

Youth career
- 2000–2003: Al-Jaish

Senior career*
Years	Team	Apps	(Gls)
2003–2008	Al-Jaish	?	(0)
2008–2010	Al-Ittihad	?	(0)
2010	Nanchang Bayi	6	(0)
2010–2011	Al-Karamah	8	(0)
2011–2012	Al-Wahda	3	(0)
2014	Nizwa	?	(?)
2015	Sur		

International career
2008–	Syria	30	(1)
- * Club domestic league appearances and goals

Adel Ahmed Abdullah (Arabic: عادل أحمد عبدالله; born 12 January 1984), commonly known as Adel Abdullah, is a Syrian footballer who plays for Sur SC in Oman Professional League.

== Club career ==
=== Nizwa ===
In 2014, he moved to Oman where he signed a one-year contract with Oman 1st Division club, Nizwa Club. On 26 January 2015, he was released by Nizwa Club.

=== Sur ===
On 26 January 2015, he signed a six-month contract with Oman Professional League club, Sur SC.

== International career ==
Adel Abdullah is currently a member of the Syria national football team. He made 6 appearances for the Syria national football team during the qualifying rounds of the 2010 FIFA World Cup.

== Career statistics ==
=== Appearances in major competitions ===
Team	Competition	Category	Appearances		Goals	Team record
Team	Competition	Category	Start	Sub	Goals	Team record
Syria	FIFA World Cup 2010 Qualifying	Senior	6	0	0	Third qualifying round
Syria	AFC Asian Cup 2011 Qualifying	Senior	3	1	0	Qualified
Syria	AFC Asian Cup 2011	Senior	0	1	0	Group Stage

=== Goals for senior national team ===
Scores and results table. Syria's goal tally first:

Goal	Date	Venue	Opponent	Score	Result	Competition
1.	2 Jan 2010	Bukit Jalil National Stadium, Kuala Lumpur, Malaysia	Zimbabwe	5-0	6-0	Friendly / Non FIFA 'A' international match

== Honours ==
=== Club ===
Al-Jaish

- AFC Cup: 2004
