= Adel Karasholi =

German and Arabic writer

Adel Karasholi (Arabic: عادل قرشولي; born October 15, 1936) is a German and Arabic writer.

== Life ==
Karasholi is of Kurdish descent. Already a published poet in his youth, he founded a literary magazine in Damascus which was banned by the Syrian government. He then began working in a publishing house and, later, as a journal and radio editor. In 1957 he became a member of the Arab Writers Union. When it was banned in 1959, Karasholi emigrated to Germany and subsequently lived in various areas of East and West Germany. In 1961 he began living permanently in Leipzig. He studied at the German Literary institute at Leipzig University where he did his doctorate on the work of Bertolt Brecht. From 1968 to 1993 he was a lecturer at Leipzig University. He is currently a freelance writer in Leipzig.

Karasholi is the author of numerous essays and books of poetry in Arabic and (since the 1960s) German, as well as a translator of prose, poetry and plays between the two languages. His translations into German from Arabic include works by Alfred Faraq and Mahmoud Darwish.

In 1980 Karasholi became a member of the East German Writers' Union. Since 1990, Karasholi has belonged to the Union of German Writers and, since 1992 to the PEN Centre Germany. He won the Leipzig Prize for Artistic Achievement in 1985 and the Albert-von-Chamisso Prize in 1992.

== Works in German ==
- Wie Seide aus Damaskus, Berlin 1968
- Umarmung der Meridiane, Halle 1978
- Brecht in arabischer Sicht, Berlin 1982
- Meine Geliebte kommt, Berlin 1983
- Daheim in der Fremde, Halle 1984
- Der Weinberg Erde, Leipzig 1986 (with Joachim Jansong)
- Wenn Damaskus nicht wäre, Munich 1992
- Also sprach Abdulla, Munich 1995
- Wie fern ist Palästina?, Leipzig 2003
- Wo du warst und wo du bist, Munich 2004
