= Adel Emara =

Egyptian general

- Military career
- Allegiance: Egypt
- Rank: General

Adel Emara is an Egyptian general. He is Deputy Defense Minister of Egypt, and a member of the Supreme Council of the Armed Forces (SCAF) which has ruled Egypt since the resignation of Hosni Mubarak in February 2011.

== Stance on army violence in Egypt ==
On 19 December 2011, Emara held a press conference in which he justified army violence against protesters in Egypt. He blamed "evil forces [which] wanted to drag Egypt into a chaos, putting army into confrontation with the people." Responding to a journalist demanding the army apologize to Egyptian women for brutality towards female protesters, he interrupted the conference to read an intelligence brief claiming that "unknown assailants were planning to set the Parliament on fire" that day. Emara, however, claimed that the incident, which he maintained was isolated, was being investigated. In October of the same year, Emara also had to defend the government violent response towards protesters', who were criticizing the failure of the government to defend Copts and their churches. The incident led to the death of at least 26 people.
