= Adel Abdulaziz =

Emirati footballer (born 1980)

Adel Abdul Aziz
Personal information
- Full name: Adel Abdul Aziz
- Date of birth: June 19, 1980 (age 46)
- Place of birth: Sharjah, United Arab Emirates
- Position: Left wing back

Youth career
- Al-Ahli

Senior career*
| Years | Team | Apps | (Gls) |
| 2007–2011 | Al-Ahli | ? | (?) |

International career
| 2008 | UAE | 2 | (0) |
- * Club domestic league appearances and goals as of February 13, 2011

Adel Abdul Aziz (born June 19, 1980) is a professional football wingback defender from the United Arab Emirates. He wears the number '13' jersey in the United Arab Emirates national football team.

At the club level, Abdulaziz played for Al-Ahli (Dubai) of the United Arab Emirates (UAE).

Abdulaziz joined the United Arab Emirates national football team in 2007 at the Gulf Cup, which his country wound up winning. He has also appeared in several qualifying matches for the 2010 FIFA World Cup.
