= Adel Guemari =

French-Algerian footballer (born 1984)

Personal information
- Date of birth: 16 February 1984 (age 42)
- Place of birth: Marseille, France
- Height: 1.72 m (5 ft 8 in)
- Position: Defender

Youth career
- 2001–2002: Bastia

Senior career*
Years	Team	Apps	(Gls)
2002–2004	Bastia	3	(0)
2004–2005	Holstein Kiel	15	(1)
2005–2007	VfL Wolfsburg II	13	(4)
2007–2008	FC Oberneuland	33	(3)
2008–2009	L'Entente SSG	22	(0)
2010	USM Annaba	14	(4)
2010–2011	MC El Eulma	0	(0)
Total		100	(12)
- * Club domestic league appearances and goals

Adel Guemari (born 16 February 1984 in Marseille) is a French-Algerian former professional footballer who played as a defender.
