= Adel Nassief =

Egyptian artist (1962–2021)

- Born: 20 October 1962; Beheira governorate, Egypt
- Died: 19 March 2021 (aged 58)
- Occupations: Painting Artist, Iconographer

Adel Nassief (Arabic: عادل نصيف; 20 October 1962 – 19 March 2021) was an Egyptian painter specializing in Coptic art. He has some work on display on the external wall of a Coptic church in Paris and some work in the Cairo modern art museum and in Coptic churches in Damanhour and Alexandria. He illustrated the book First Christmas by Alastair Macdonald.

He received a bachelor of fine arts, Faculty of Arts, Alexandria University Department of Painting with General Grade Very Good with high Honours 1985. He then did specialised studies in Coptic Art and Icons at the Institute of Coptic Studies, Cairo.

Nassief died on 19 March 2021, at the age of 58, after contracting COVID-19.

== Biography ==
Born in 1938. He started his acting career on stage at the university theater. He was one of the members of the Tholathy Adwa'a El Masrah comedy trio, with George Sidhom and Samir Ghanem. However, Adel Nassif left after one month, so George and Samir began the search for a replacement for Adel, after which they found El Deif Ahmed. He immigrated to Brazil in 1973 and died in 2000.

== See also ==
- List of Copts
- Icon
