= Adel Eid =

Egyptian-Finnish football player (born 1984)

Personal information
- Date of birth: 22 March 1984 (age 42)
- Place of birth: Helsinki, Finland
- Height: 1.80 m (5 ft 11 in)
- Position: Centre-back

Youth career
- –1996: Ponnistus
- 1996–1998: HJK Helsinki

Senior career*
Years	Team	Apps	(Gls)
1998–2000	HJK Helsinki	?	(?)
2000–2004	KäPa	34	(0)
2005–2006	Honka	14	(0)
2007–2009	Atlantis	55	(3)
2010	PK-35	19	(0)
2011–2018	SoVo		
- * Club domestic league appearances and goals

Adel Eid (born 22 March 1984) is a former professional footballer who played as a centre-back. His father is Egyptian and his mother Finnish.

== Career ==
The defender, who is 5'11" tall and weighs 159 pounds, previously played for FC Honka and HJK Helsinki. His main role is as the centre-back or defensive midfielder within his team's first eleven.

== Honours ==
2 Finnish League with HJK Helsinki
