= Adel Chbouki =

Moroccan footballer

Personal information
- Date of birth: 3 May 1971 (age 55)
- Position: Midfielder

International career
Years	Team	Apps	(Gls)
- Morocco

Adel Chbouki (born 3 May 1971) is a Moroccan former footballer. He competed in the men's tournament at the 2000 Summer Olympics.
