= Adele (given name) =

- Pronunciation: /əˈdɛl/
- Gender: Female
- Name day: 24 December (Italy)

Origin
- Origin: German
- Meaning: 'Nobility' in German, from Proto-Germanic *aþalą; cf. English athel

Other names
- See also: Adela, Adelaide, Adelheid, Adelia, Adeline, Zélie

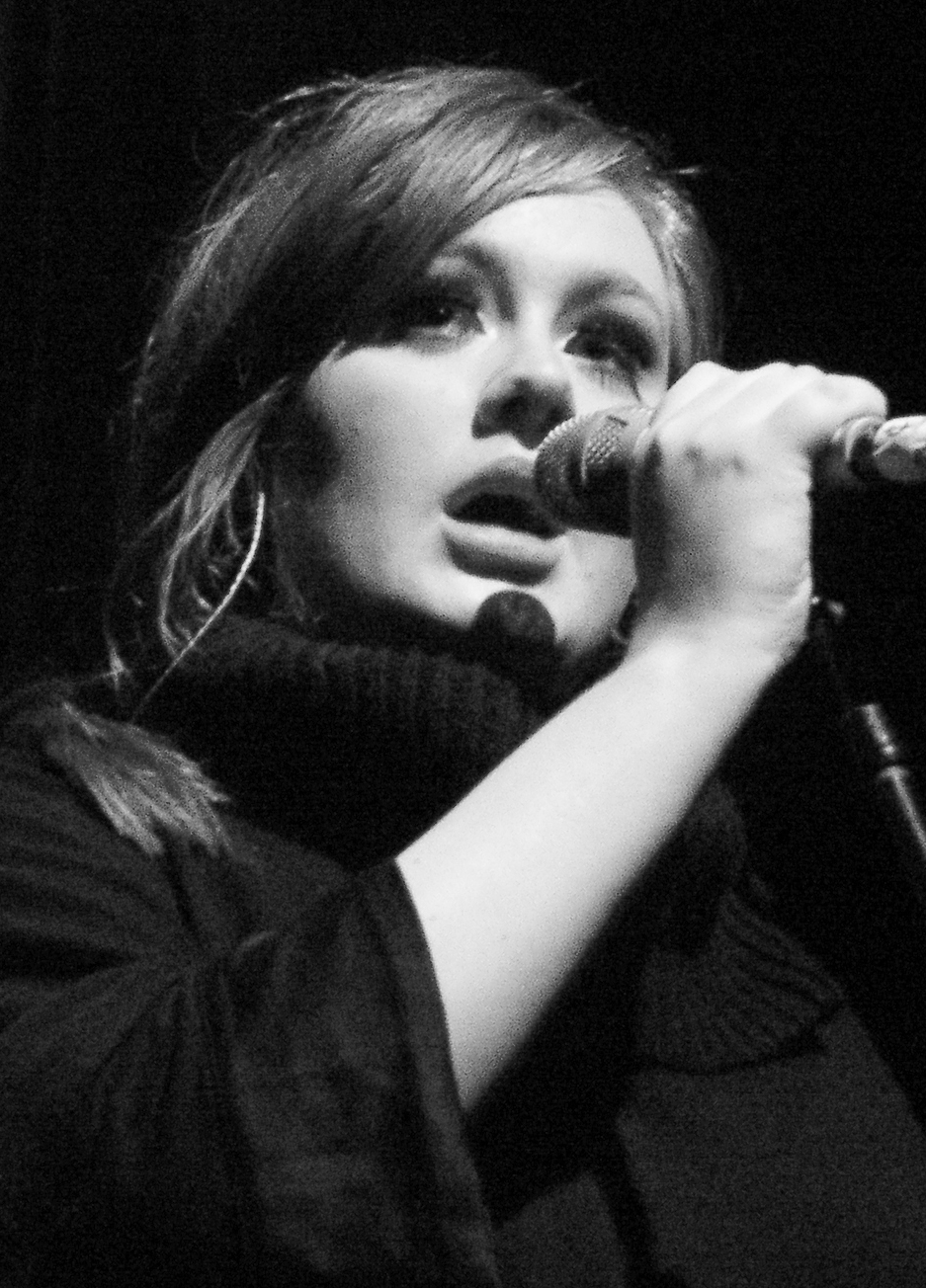
English singer and songwriter Adele

Adele (also spelled Adèle) is a feminine given name meaning 'nobility'. It derives from German Adel meaning 'nobility' or adal, 'noble'. In Italy its name day is 24 December in honor of Adela of Pfalzel.

Its male form is the Germanic given name Adel.

The name, also spelled Adel, is also in use in Israel, where it stands for the Hebrew phrase esh dat lamo (אש דת למו) or a fiery law unto them, used in reference to the Torah.

== People with the given name ==
- Adèle of Champagne (1140–1206), French queen consort
- Adèle Charvet (born 1993), French mezzo-soprano
- Adèle of Dreux, French countess
- Adele of Meaux (950–980), French countess
- Adele of Valois, French countess
- Adele of Vermandois (910–960), French countess
- Adele Addison (born 1925), American singer
- Adele Adkins, professionally known just as Adele (born 1988), English singer-songwriter
- Adele Ajosun (died 1837), Oba of Lagos
- Adèle Almati (1861–1919), German-Swedish opera singer
- Adèle Anderson (born 1952), British singer
- Adele Änggård (1933–2023), British-Swedish costume and stage designer
- Adele Anthony (born 1970), Australian musician
- Adele Arakawa (born 1958), American news anchor
- Adele Armin (1945–2022), Canadian classical violinist
- Adele Astaire (1897–1981), American singer and dancer
- Adelle August (1934–2005), American movie actress
- Adele Laeis Baldwin (1864–1927), American singer
- Adèle Bayer (1814–1892), Belgian missionary
- Adelle Blackett, Canadian legal scholar
- Adele Bloch-Bauer (1881–1925), Austro-Hungarian socialite, salon hostess and patron of the arts
- Adèle Bourgeois (1870–1935), French-Canadian author, composer
- Adele Boyd (1932–2018), American field hockey player
- Adele Broadbent (born 1968), New Zealand children's author
- Adele Carles (born 1968), Australian politician
- Adèle Castillon (born 2001), French singer and actress
- Adèle Christiaens, Belgian fencer
- Adele Clarke (1945–2024), American sociologist
- Adele Cutler, English-born New Zealand and American statistician
- L. Adele Cuinet (1854/55-1933), pioneer American dental surgeon
- Adelle Davis (1904–1974), American author
- Adele DeGarde (1899–1972), American actress
- Adele DeLeeuw (1899–1988), American writer
- Adele Diamond, Canadian psychologist
- Adele Dixon (1908–1992), English actor
- Adele Dunlap (1902–2017), American teacher and nation's oldest living person at the time of her death
- Adele Duttweiler (1892–1990), Swiss philanthropist
- Adèle Exarchopoulos, French actress
- Adele Faccio (1920–2007), Italian politician
- Adele Farina (born 1964), Australian politician
- Adele Fátima (born 1954), Brazilian actress, model and dancer
- Adele Ferguson, Australian investigative journalist
- Adele Fifield (born 1966), Canadian director
- Adele Garrison, American writer
- Adèle Geras (born 1944), English writer
- Adele Girard (1913–1993), American jazz harpist
- Adele Givens, American actress
- Adele Goldberg (linguist) (born 1963), American linguist
- Adele Goldberg (computer scientist) (born 1945), American computer scientist
- Adele Goldstine (1920–1964), American computer scientist
- Adele Khoury Graham (born 1938), Lebanese educator
- Adele Griffin (born 1970), American writer
- M. Adelle Hazlett (1837–1911), American women's suffrage leader
- Adèle Haenel (born 1989), French actress
- Adele C. Howells (1886–1951), American general president of the Primary
- Adèle Hugo (1830–1915), French diary writer and daughter of author Victor Hugo
- Adèle Isaac (1854–1915), French opera singer
- Adele James, British actor and screenwriter
- Adele Jergens (1917–2002), American actress
- Adele Kern (1901–1980), German soprano opera and operetta singer
- Adèle Kindt (1804–1884), Belgian painter
- Adele King (born 1951), Irish entertainer
- Adele Kurzweil (1925–1942), Austrian Holocaust victim
- Adèle Caby-Livannah (born 1957), African writer
- Adelle Lutz (born 1948), American artist
- Adele Mara (1923–2010), American actress
- Adele Marcus (1906–1995), American pianist
- Adele Megann (born 1962), Canadian writer
- Adele Morales (1925–2015), American painter and memoirist
- Adele Nicoll (born 1996), Welsh shot putter, discus thrower and bobsledder
- Adele aus der Ohe (1864–1937), German pianist and composer
- Adelle Onyango (born 1989), Kenyan radio presenter
- Adele Parks (born 1969), English novelist
- Adele Passy-Cornet (1838–1915), German opera singer
- Adele W. Paxson (1913–2000), American socialite
- Adele Racheli (1897–1992), Italian engineer, co-founder of patent protection office
- Adele Raemer, American-Israeli blogger
- Adele Ramos, Belizean poet, author, journalist and publisher
- Adele Reinhartz, Canadian academic
- Adele Roberts (born 1979), British radio DJ and television personality
- Adel Rootstein (1930–1992), British mannequin designer
- Adele Rose (1933–2020), British television writer
- Adele Rova, (born 1996) Fijian swimmer
- Adele Emily Sandé, known as Emeli Sandé (born 1987), Scottish singer-songwriter
- Adele Sandrock (1863–1937), German actress
- Adele Silva (born 1980), British soap actress
- Adele Simpson (1903–1995), American fashion designer
- Adele Spitzeder (1832–1895), German actor, folk singer and confidence trickster
- Adele Stolte (1932–2020), German soprano singer
- Adelle Stripe (born 1976), English poet
- Adele Stürzl (1892–1944), Austrian resistance fighter
- Adelle Tracey (born 1993), American-born middle-distance runner
- Adèle de Batz de Trenquelléon (1789–1828), French nun
- Adele Tucker (1868–1971), Bermudian schoolteacher and trade unionist
- Adele Ann Wilby (born 1950), Australian activist
- Adelle Waldman (born 1977), American writer
- Adèle Wetterlind (1854–1938), Swedish educator and suffragist
- Adele Wiseman (1928–1992), Canadian author
- Adele Wong (born 1983), Singaporean actress

== Fictional characters ==
- Adele Airota, mother-in-law of the narrator Elena in the Neapolitan Novels
- Adele Azupadi, a character in the TV series The Story of Tracy Beaker
  - Elena's daughter, also named Adele Airota, but always called Dede
- Adèle Blanc-Sec, main character of Les Aventures extraordinaires d'Adèle Blanc-Sec written by Jacques Tardi
- Adele Ferguson, a character in the novel Behind Her Eyes by Sarah Pinborough
- Adele Mundy, Communications Officer, librarian, and spy in David Drake's RCN Series of space opera novels
- Adèle Ratignolle, a standard of feminine beauty in the American classic The Awakening by Kate Chopin
- Adele Stackhouse, Sookie's grandmother in True Blood
- Adèle Varens, the young French ward of Mr. Rochester in the novel Jane Eyre and its adaptations

== See also ==
- Adelheid
- Adelaide (given name)
- Adila (name)
