= Caby =

Caby is a surname. Notable people with the surname include:

- Adèle Caby-Livannah (born 1957), Congolese writer
- André Caby (1892–1915), French Olympic swimmer
- Robert Caby (1905–1992), French composer and writer
- Taylor Caby (born 1983), American poker player and entrepreneur
