= Adelheid =

Adelheid is the modern Dutch and German form of the Old High German female given name Adalheid, meaning "nobility" or "noble-ness". It may refer to the following people:

== Royalty and nobility ==
- Saint Adelheid or Adelaide of Italy, (931–999), Holy Roman Empress and second wife of Holy Roman Emperor Otto the Great
- Eupraxia of Kiev (1071–1109), regnal name Adelheid
- Adelheid of Wolfratshausen (died 1126), second wife of Berengar II, Count of Sulzbach
- Adelheid of Vohburg (1122–1190), first Queen consort of Frederick I, Holy Roman Emperor
- Adelheid (abbess of Müstair) (fl. 1211–1233), Swiss Benedictine abbess
- Adelaide of Cleves (died 1238), also called Adelheid, Countess of Holland, wife of Dirk VII
- Adelheid von Gallitzin (1748–1806), Russian princess from Prussia
- Adelheid von Sachsen-Meiningen (1792–1849), Queen consort of the United Kingdom (Queen Adelaide)
- Princess Adelheid of Anhalt-Bernburg-Schaumburg-Hoym (1800–1820), Duchess of Oldenburg
- Princess Adelheid of Schaumburg-Lippe (1821–1899), Duchess of Schleswig-Holstein-Sonderburg-Glücksburg
- Adelaide of Löwenstein-Wertheim-Rosenberg (1831–1909), wife of Miguel I of Portugal
- Princess Adelheid-Marie of Anhalt-Dessau (1833–1916), Grand Duchess of Luxembourg
- Princess Adelheid of Hohenlohe-Langenburg (1835–1900), niece of Queen Victoria of the United Kingdom
- Princess Feodora Adelheid of Schleswig-Holstein-Sonderburg-Augustenburg (1874–1910), daughter of Frederick VIII, Duke of Schleswig-Holstein
- Princess Victoria Adelaide of Schleswig-Holstein (1885–1970), Duchess of Saxe-Coburg and Gotha
- Princess Helena Adelaide of Schleswig-Holstein-Sonderburg-Glücksburg (1888–1962), wife of Prince Harald of Denmark
- Princess Adelaide of Schleswig-Holstein-Sonderburg-Glücksburg (1889–1964), Princess of Solms-Baruth
- Marie-Adélaïde, Grand Duchess of Luxembourg (1894–1924)
- Princess Marie Adelheid of Lippe (1895–1993), Princess Reuss of Köstritz
- Archduchess Adelheid of Austria (1914–1971), member of the Austrian Imperial Family
- Princess Adelheid of Liechtenstein (born 1981), daughter of Prince Vincenz of Liechtenstein

== Other people ==
- Adelheid Maria Eichner (1762–1787), German composer
- Adelheid Popp (1869–1939), Austrian journalist and politician
- Adelheid Seeck (1912–1973), German film actress
- Adelheid Arndt (born 1952), German actress
- Adelheid Schulz (born 1955), German terrorist
- Adelheid Morath (born 1984), German cross-country mountain biker

== See also ==
- Adelaide (given name), the English form of the name
- Heidi (given name), a nickname for Adelheid
- Adele (given name), a short form of Adelheid
