= Onyango =

Onyango is a Luo language word used by the Luo people of South Sudan, Uganda, Kenya and Lake Victoria region of Tanzania. The word is time oriented referring to the morning period beginning after sunrise to before midday hours.

Onyango is also a surname used by Luo people in Kenya, Tanzania, South Sudan and Uganda meaning "Born in the late morning hours":

- Adelle Onyango (born 1989), Kenyan radio presenter, social activist and media personality
- Brian Onyango (born 1994), Kenyan football player
- Charles Onyango-Obbo (born 1958), Ugandan author, journalist, editor of The Monitor
- Denis Onyango (born 1985), Ugandan football player
- Joash Onyango (born 1993), Kenyan football player
- Joe Oloka-Onyango (born 1960), Ugandan lawyer and academic
- Lameck Onyango (born 1973), Kenyan cricketer
- Lucas Onyango (born 1981), Kenyan rugby player
- Zeituni Onyango (1952–2014), public health and half-aunt of Barack Obama

== Fictional ==
- Tobias Onyango Fünke, a fictional character on the television show Arrested Development
