= Saint John Abbey, Müstair =

Benedictine Abbey of St. John at Müstair
UNESCO World Heritage Site
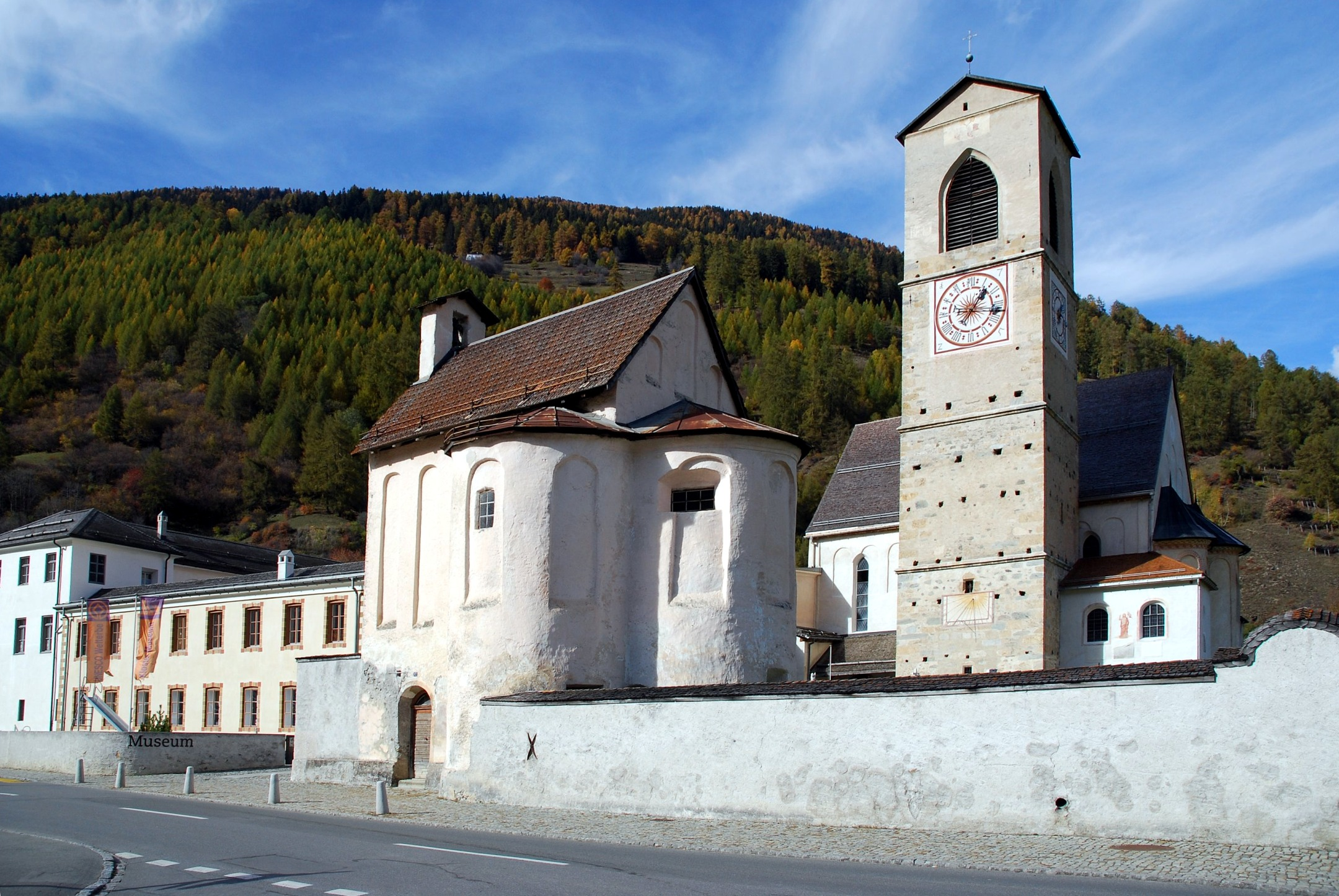
- Benedictine Abbey of Saint John

- Location within Switzerland
- Location: Santa Maria Val Müstair in Val Müstair, Graubünden, Switzerland
- Criteria: Cultural: iii
- Reference: 269
- Inscription: 1983 (7th Session)
- Coordinates: 46°37′45″N 10°26′52″E

The Abbey of Saint John (German: Benediktinerinnenkloster St. Johann; Romansh: Claustra benedictina da Son Jon) is an early medieval Benedictine monastery in the Swiss municipality of Val Müstair, in the Canton of Graubünden. By reason of its exceptionally well-preserved heritage of Carolingian art, it has been a UNESCO World Heritage Site since 1983.

== History ==
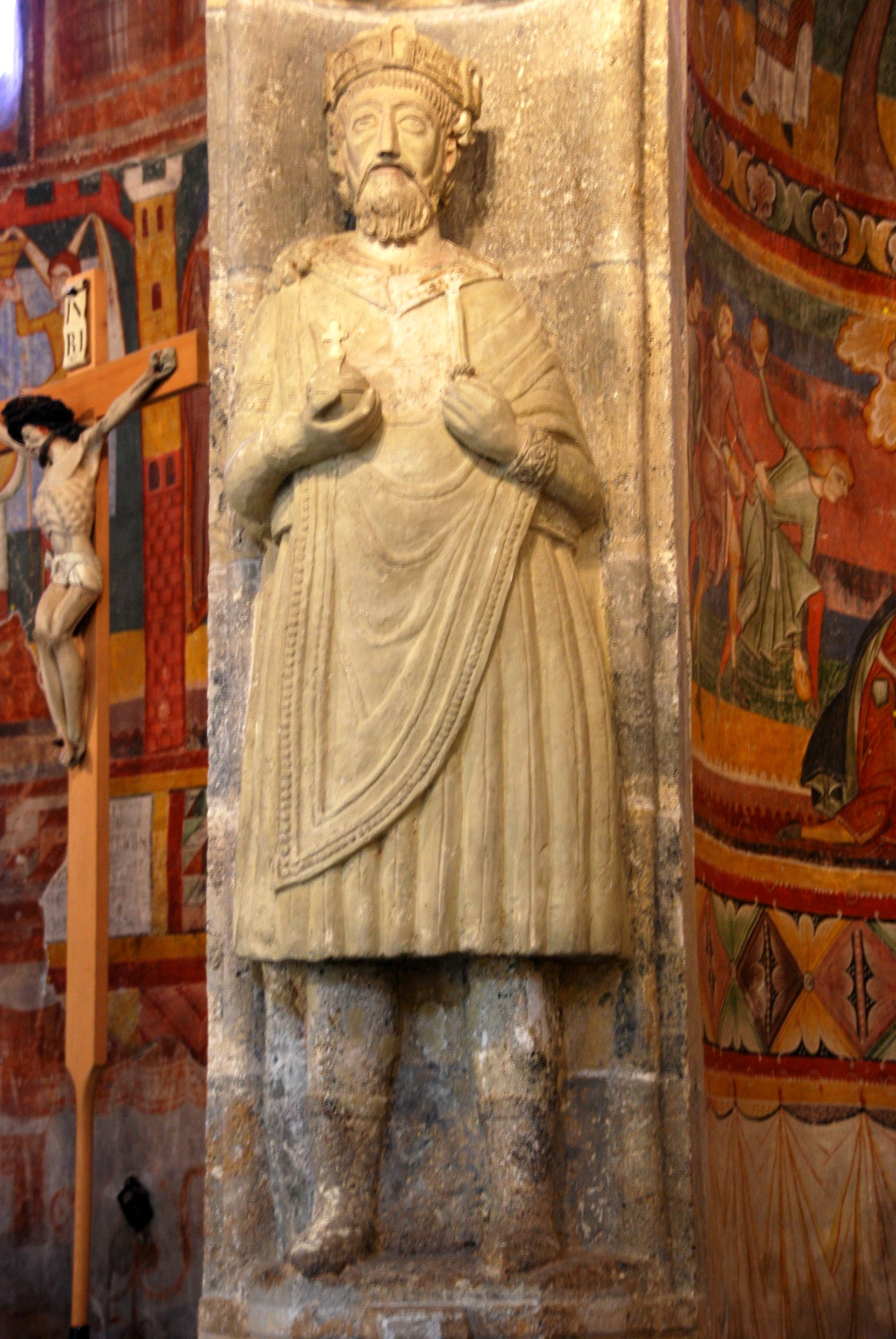
Statue of Charlemagne in the abbey church

The Carolingian Renaissance is deeply in debt to the success of Charlemagne as a king and patron, and the driving force behind what we see in St John Abbey. Throughout history, art, education and leisure have all only truly thrived in times of peace, although war is often the most important factor for technological change. In the early Middle Ages the constant conflicts between the Frankish Kingdoms hindered the artistic progress previously enjoyed by the Romans when their empire was at its height. Under Charlemagne's prosperous kingship, the introduction of a new peacetime monastic order began, paving the way for the frescos and architecture seen at Saint John Abbey.

As a devout Christian, Charlemagne wished to further the ability for his people to be both educated in the teachings of the church, and for his kingdom to be stable. One of the many ways that he achieved this was through his patronage of many monasteries throughout the Frankish Kingdom. The monasteries served as a training ground for missionaries, who were to be sent to the newly conquered areas of his empire and effect their conversion to Christianity. His goals were mostly focused on education, and his mission as king was to provide the basis for the education of the clergy so they could, in turn, educate the parishioners. These monasteries served as canvas for much of the art and architecture of the Carolingian Renaissance.

The Carolingian artisans were known to be skilled painters, jewelers, and goldsmiths. Their aptitude for extensive and grandiose decoration was often used to decorate the manuscripts that were written by monks at abbeys such as St John's. Such skilled and advanced artistry further highlights the importance of peace as a canvas for improved art and architecture in a civilization. As it is possible to see from the Pictures of St John's frescoes, painting was also a large part of the Carolingian Renaissance. The Carolingian style of painting was founded in Roman, Christian and Germanic styles. The manner in which figures were portrayed was clearly Roman in style, the subject matter very often Christian, and the geometric designs and animal figures were Germanic in nature. Depictions from the gospels, as well as those of King David were particularly popular, as well as some Carolingian kings, and of course Christ in majesty.

It is believed that the abbey was established c. 780 by a bishop of Chur, perhaps under orders from Charlemagne. It was built during a wave of monastery construction that included the nearby monasteries at Cazis, Mistail, Pfäfers, and Disentis. The abbey was located along the Val Müstair pass over the Alps from Italy and was fortified to allow it to control the pass. In 881 the abbey passed over to be completely under the control of the Bishop of Chur. During the early years of the abbey, in the early 9th century, a series of frescos were painted in the church. Later, in the 11th and 12th centuries, the abbey experienced a second expansion and new paintings were added or painted over the old frescoes. These paintings were only rediscovered in the 20th century.

In the 10th century, the church tower was added to the abbey church. During the expansion of the 11th century, the bishop of Chur enlarged his residence at the monastery. A fine tower home, cloister, and the double chapel of St. Ulrich and St. Nicholas were added. During the expansion, the two-story residence chapel of the bishop was also decorated with extensive stucco and fresco work. At some time in the 12th century, the occupants of the abbey changed from monks to nuns. This change is first mentioned in 1167, but it happened sometime before this date. The first abbess known by name is Adelheid, attested between 1211 and 1233.

The Swabian War, which was an attempt by the Habsburgs to assert control over the Grisons and key alpine passes, started at the convent. On 20 January 1499, Habsburg troops occupied the surrounding valley and plundered the convent, but were soon driven back by the forces of the Three Leagues at the Battle of Calven. Following the raid, an armistice was signed between the Habsburgs and the Three Leagues. However, this armistice only lasted a few days before the conflicts broke out between the Three Leagues' Old Swiss Confederacy allies and the Habsburg troops. These raids quickly escalated into the Swabian War, which ended in September 1499 with the Treaty of Basel granting virtual independence to the Swiss Confederacy.

About 1500 the abbey church was modified from a single-nave Carolingian construction into a three-nave late Gothic church. Shortly thereafter, in 1524 and 1526, through the Ilanzer Articles, the League of God's House was able to weaken the temporal power of the bishop, which had the indirect effect of reducing the income of the abbey. Consequently, there was limited construction on the abbey following this.

In the spirit of the Council of Trent the bishop issued a series of reforms governing religious life between 1600 and 1614. The reforms included new regulations as to who could receive the sacraments and the publication of the breviary. Other policies, such as the requirement in the Benedictine Rule for common sleeping areas, were also relaxed in this era.

Throughout the history of the Abbey of Saint John there were conflicts between the Bishop of Chur, the Grey League and the House of Habsburg. The abbey's ruler, the abbess, and the government authority, the vogt, were often chosen by one of these three powers.

== Paintings ==
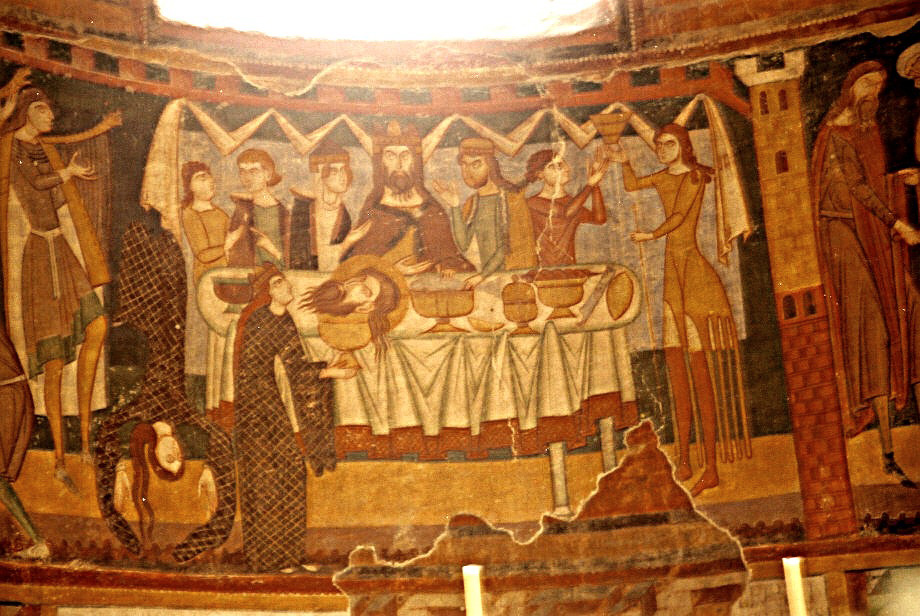
Dinner of Herod Antipas with dancing Salome

During the 20th-century restoration works, some Romanesque frescoes from the 1160s were discovered here. Other murals are dated to Charlemagne's reign. The UNESCO recognized these as "Switzerland's greatest series of figurative murals, painted c. A.D. 800, along with Romanesque frescoes and stuccoes".

The figures seen in the frescos of St Johns are of balanced and symmetrical composition, and throughout the church this creates a sense of story and rhythm. The artist's rapid application of paint and his use of brightness are a means of drawing attention to certain images over others, and shows the complexity and sophistication of the artist's skill. There is a clear link between the frescos seen here in Mustair and those seen in the Lombard Church of Santa Maria foris portas di Castelseprio, has led some academics to believe that the artist were either local or at the very least familiar with the work seen there. One of the main reasons for the popularity of paintings was that literacy is not required. As a result of this, the stories of Christianity and the messages that the clergy wish to share become more easily accessible to the masses that may or may not be literate. The Abbey of St John holds some of the most important biblical stories. These stories hold greater implications for the modern day viewer as it shows what was considered to be the most important elements of Christianity at the time.

The original single nave church with five apses has several significant Early Middle Ages frescoes from around 800. The paintings are organized in five rows that stretch from the southern wall across the west wall to the northern wall. The top row features scenes from the life of King David of the Hebrew Bible/Old Testament. The next three rows show scenes from the youth, life, and Passion of Christ. The bottom row contains scenes from the crucifixion of St. Andreas. On the western wall the rows are tied together with an image of the Last Judgment. The paintings were done in a limited range of colors including ochre, red, and brown and help in the "comprehension of the evolution of certain Christian iconographic themes, like that of the last judgment".

The importance of The Last Judgment is a substantial element in the power of the church over its congregation. What the fresco depicts is the end of the world, and the judgment that will befall all of mankind. Here people are assessed for their sins, and if they have asked forgiveness for their sins. Although it would be foolish to assume that all who visited the church at the time believed exactly what was depicted on its walls, we can draw conclusions about the messages the church was trying to portray about the importance of confession and a sense of self-assessment when it comes to the question of morality.

Many of the frescos were painted over and only some have been restored.

The apses and the eastern wall were repainted in the 12th century with Romanesque frescoes showing a variety of biblical themes including the dinner of Herod Antipas (where the dancing of Herodias' daughter leads to the execution of John the Baptist), the wise and foolish virgins, apostles, and St. Stephen.

== Gallery ==
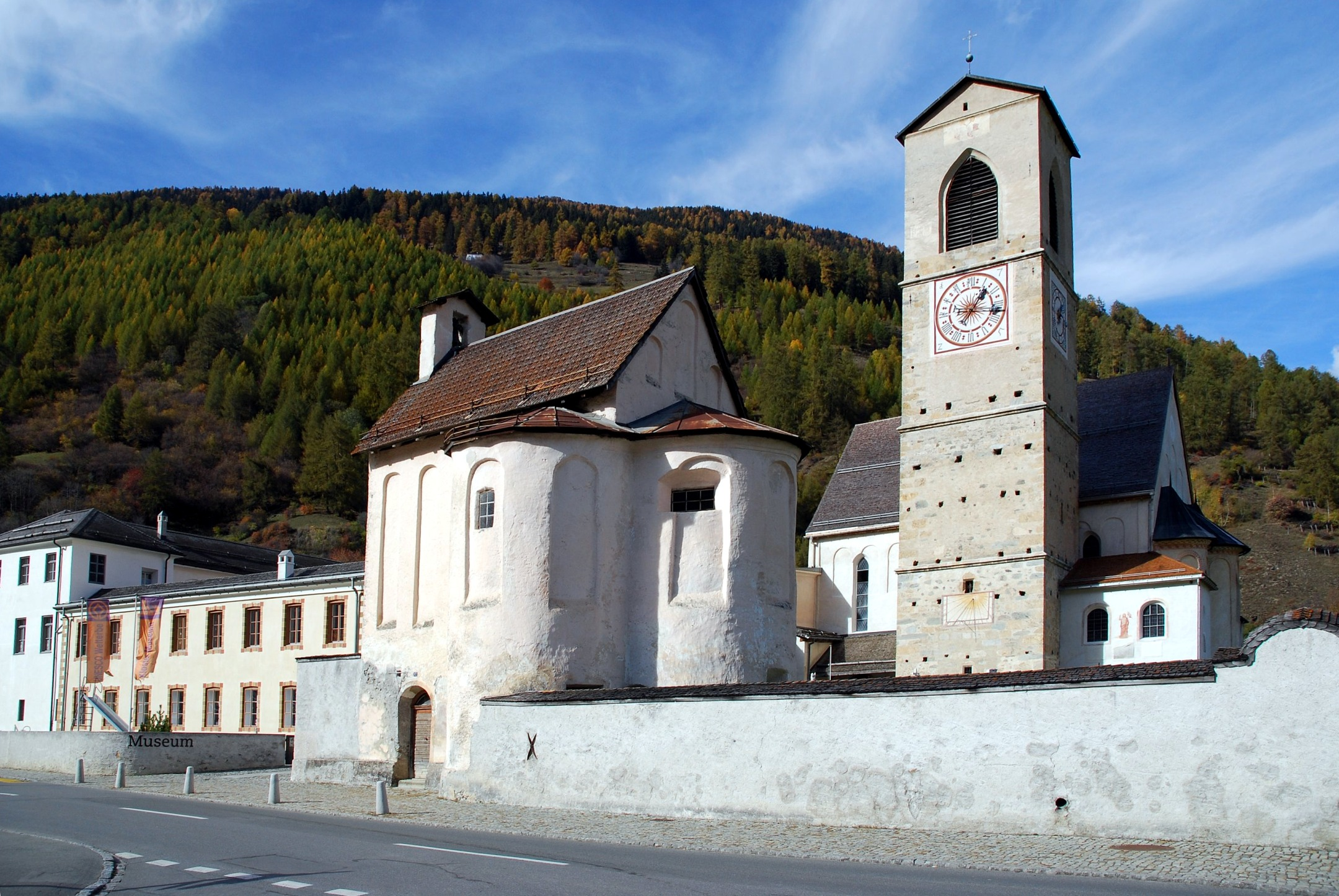
Benedictine Abbey of St. John

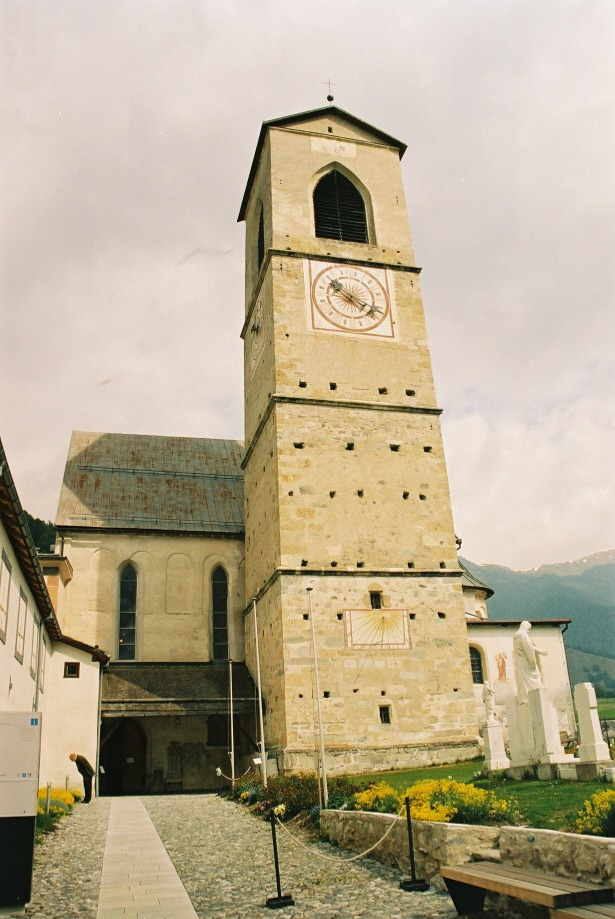
Abbey of St. John (2)

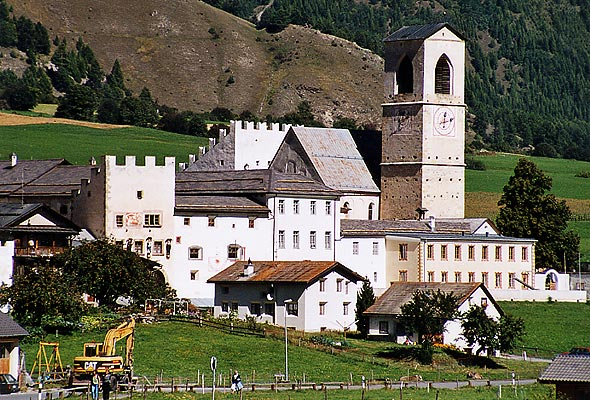
Abbey of St. John

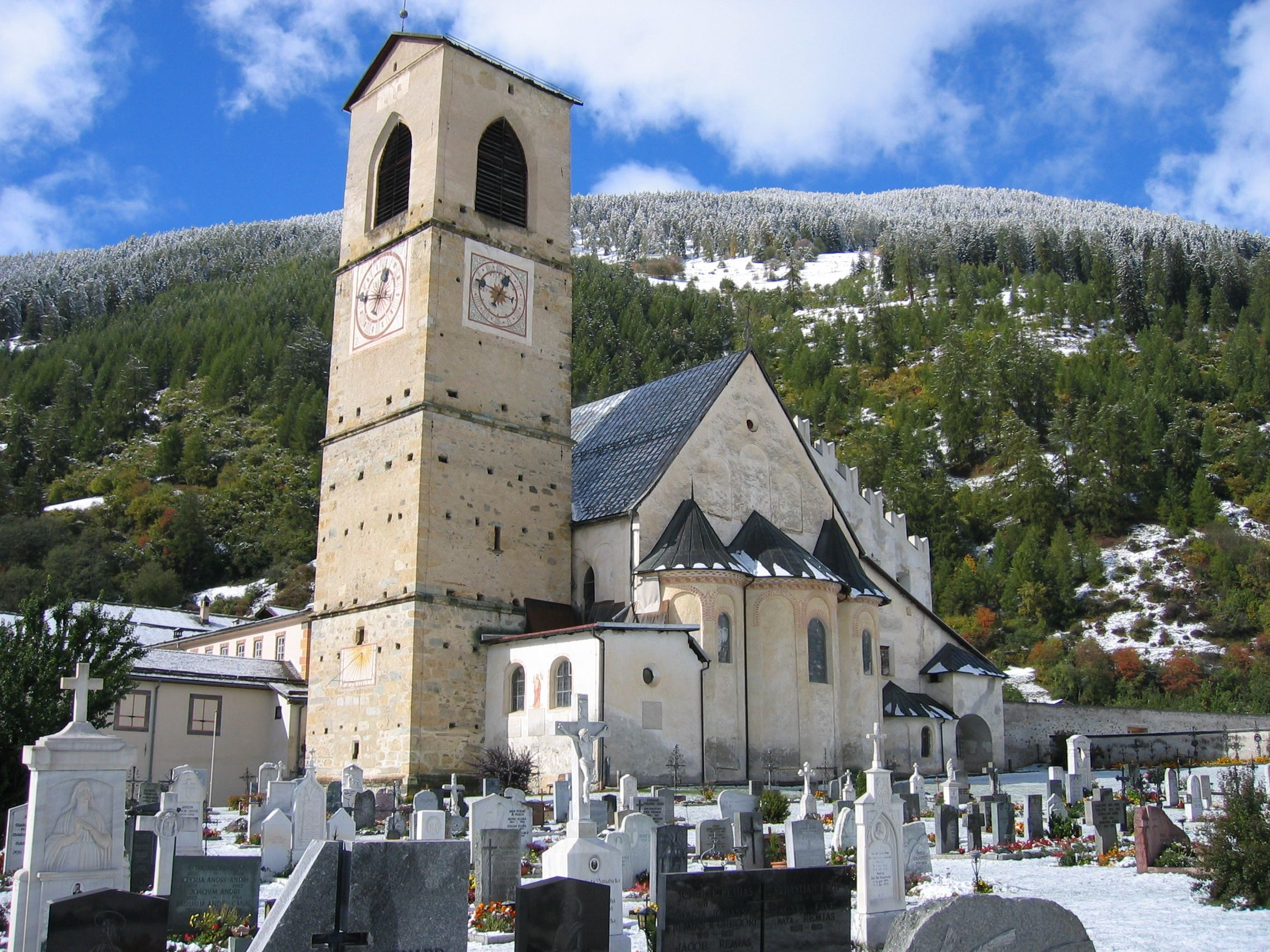
Abbey of St. John (2)

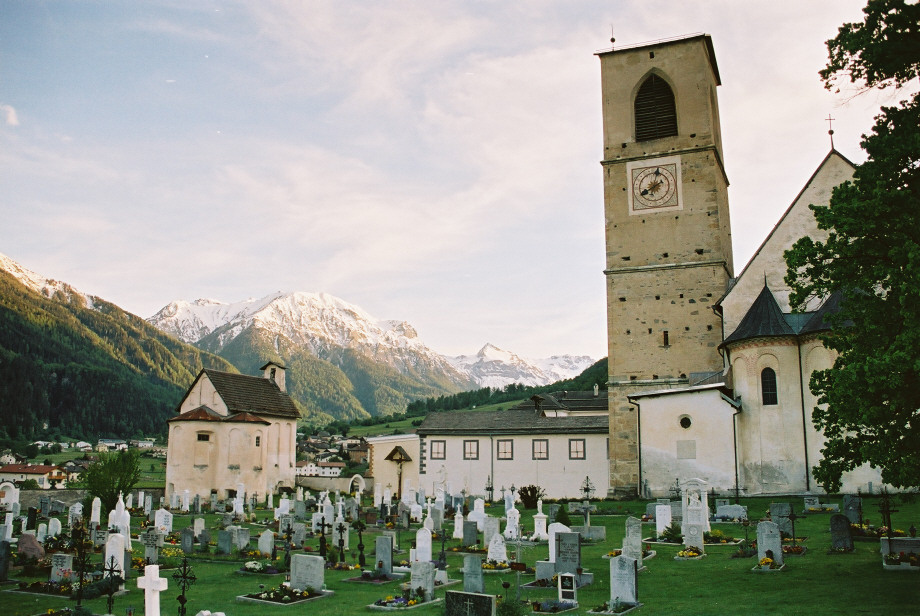
Abbey church

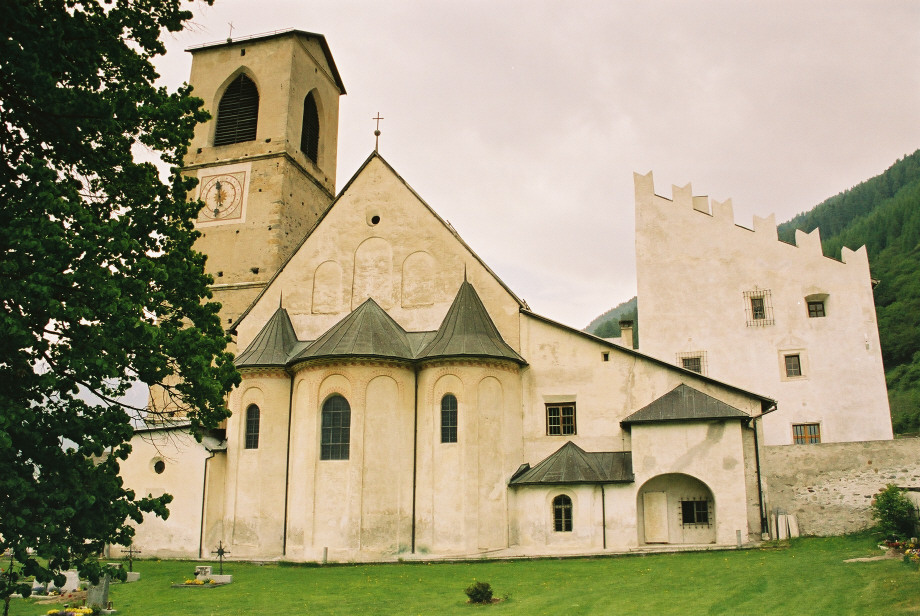
Abbey church with tower home (right)

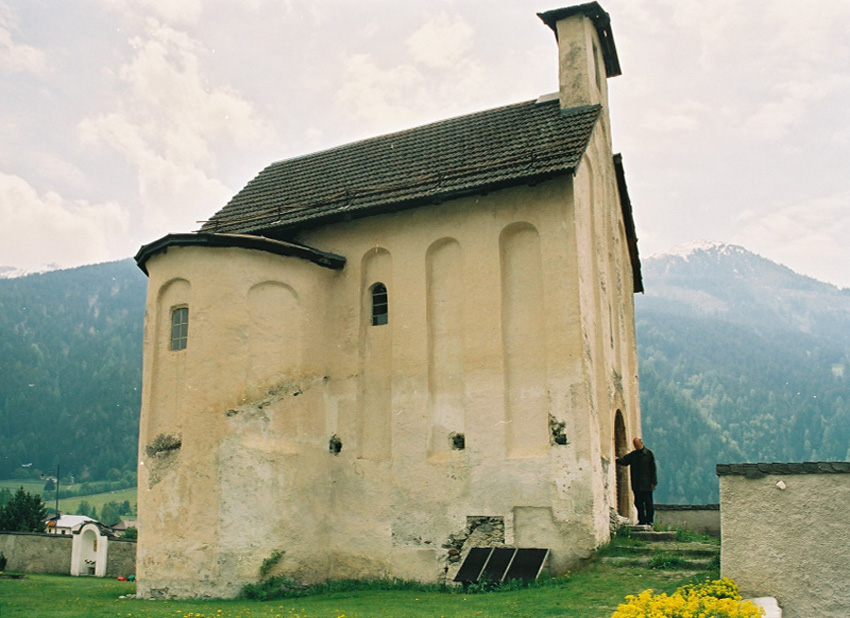
Chapel of the Cross

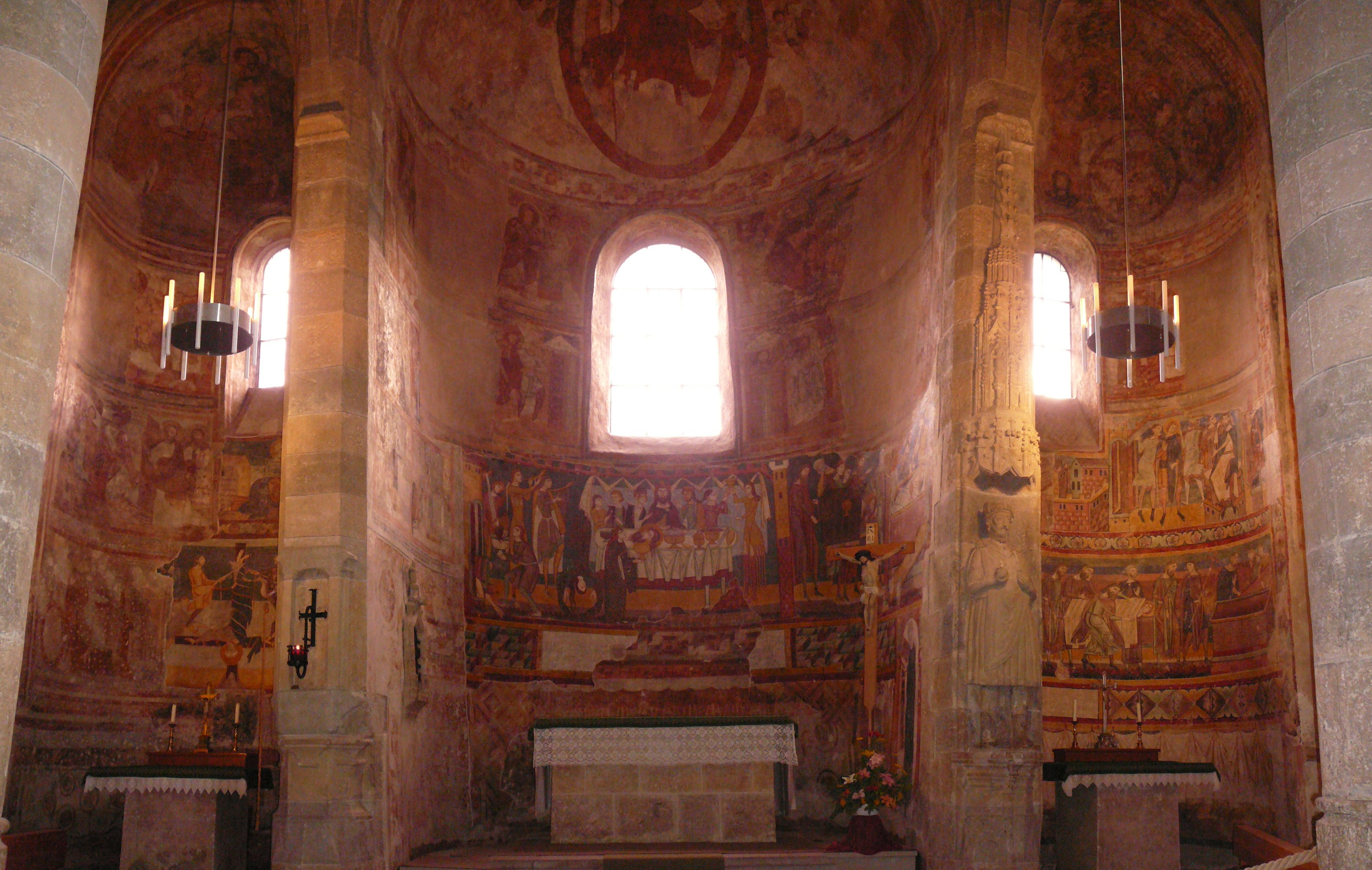
Three-nave church

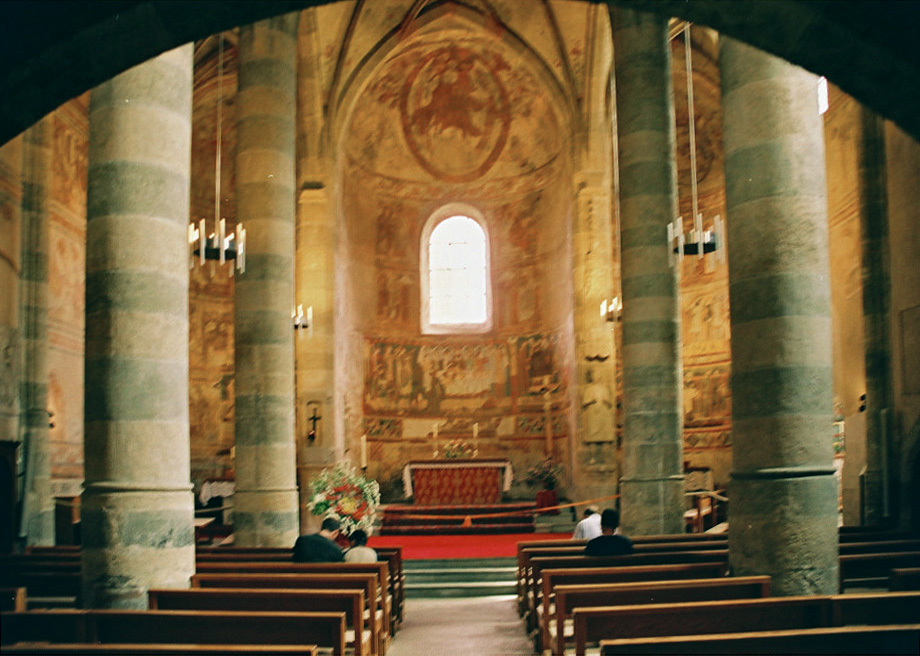
View of the central apse

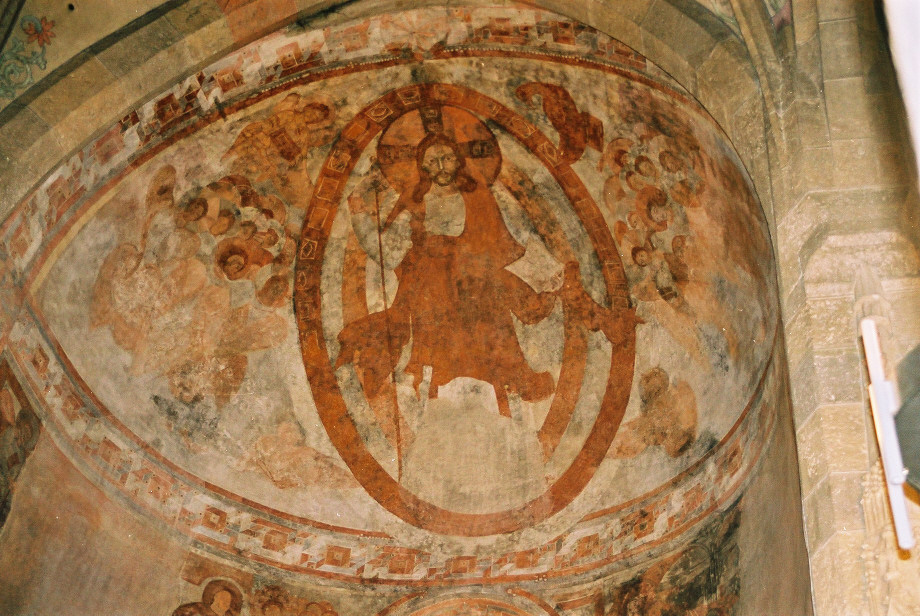
Christ as Pantokrator

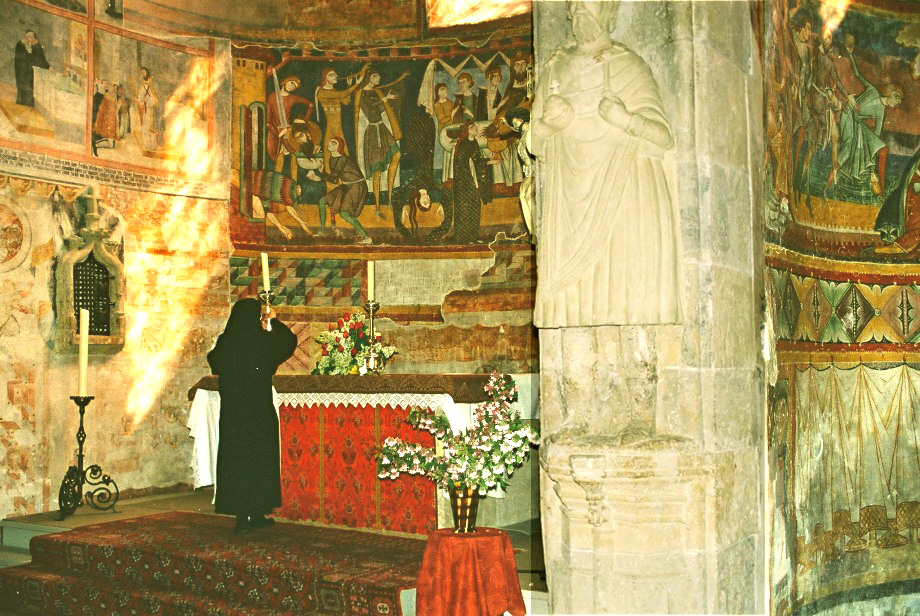
Central apse with dinner of Herod Antipas and statue of Charlemagne

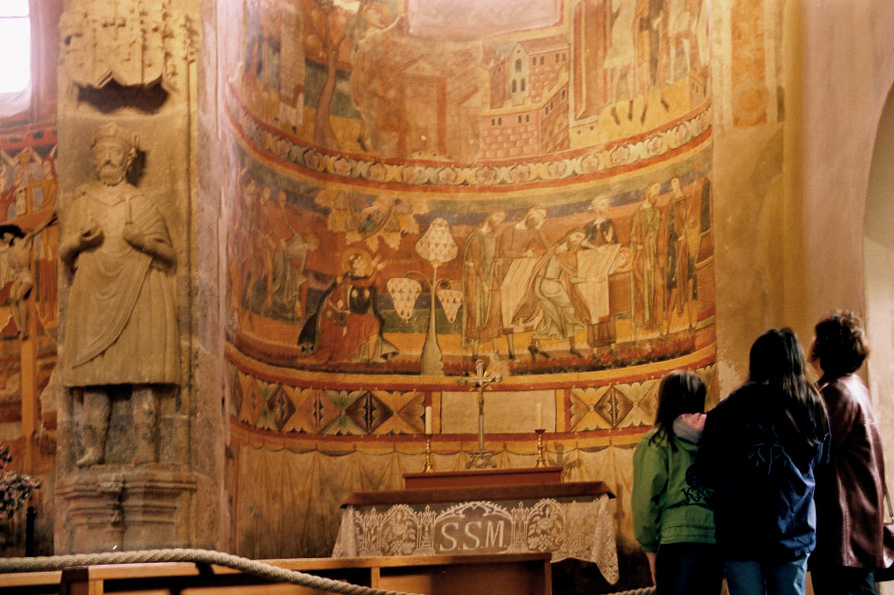
Southern apse

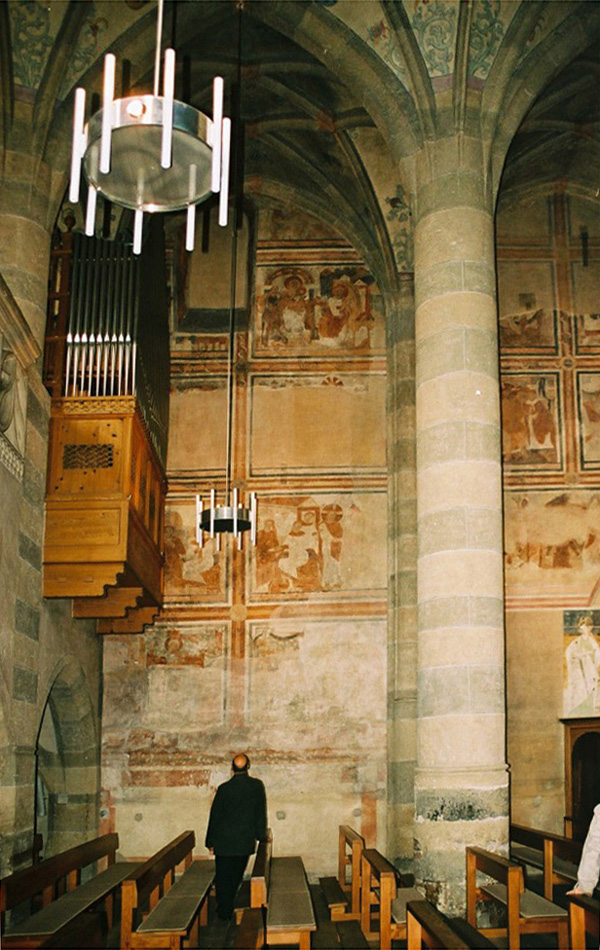
Carolingian frescoes on the north wall

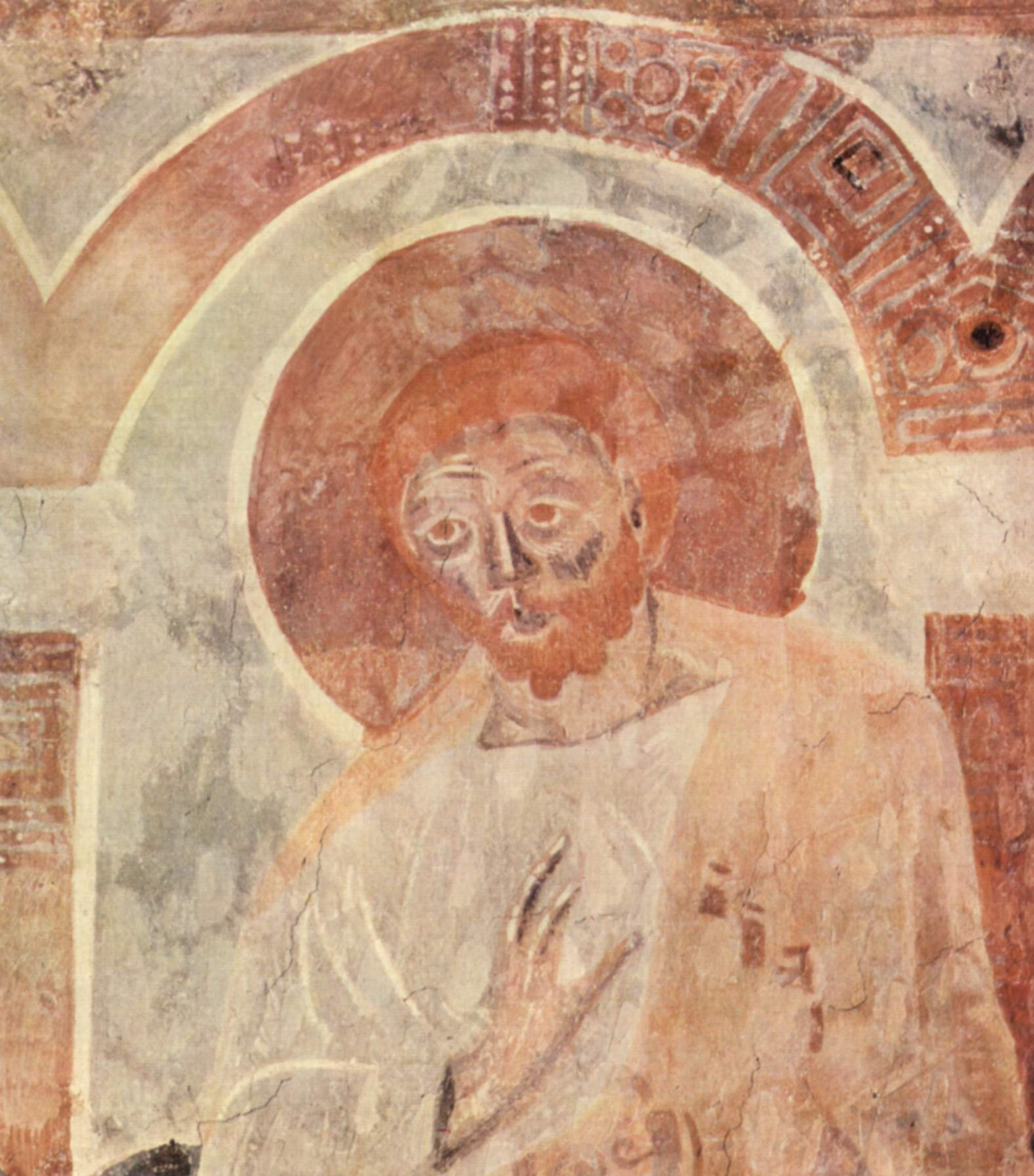
Carolingian fresco: Apostle figure, detail

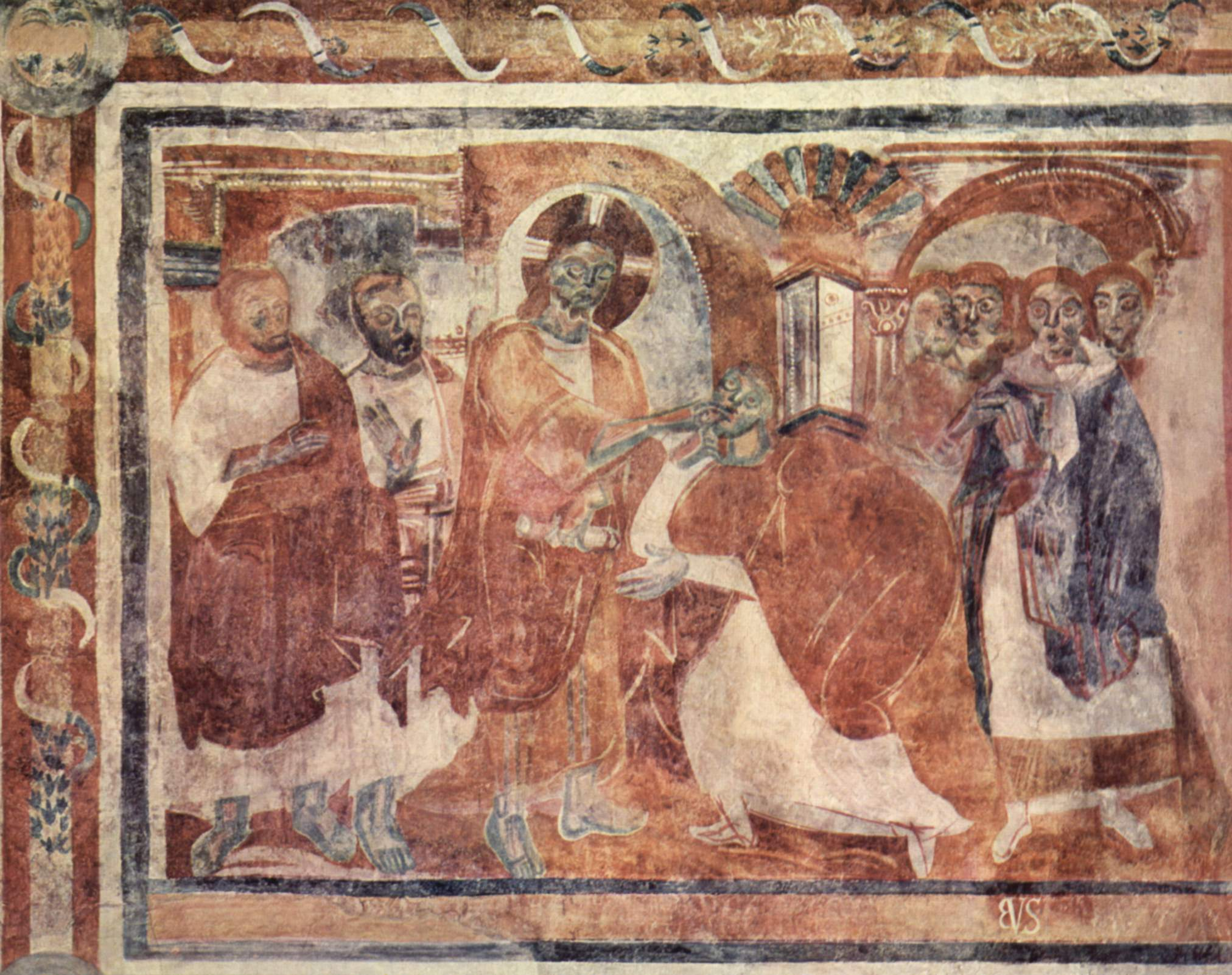
Carolingian fresco showing Christ healing a deaf-mute

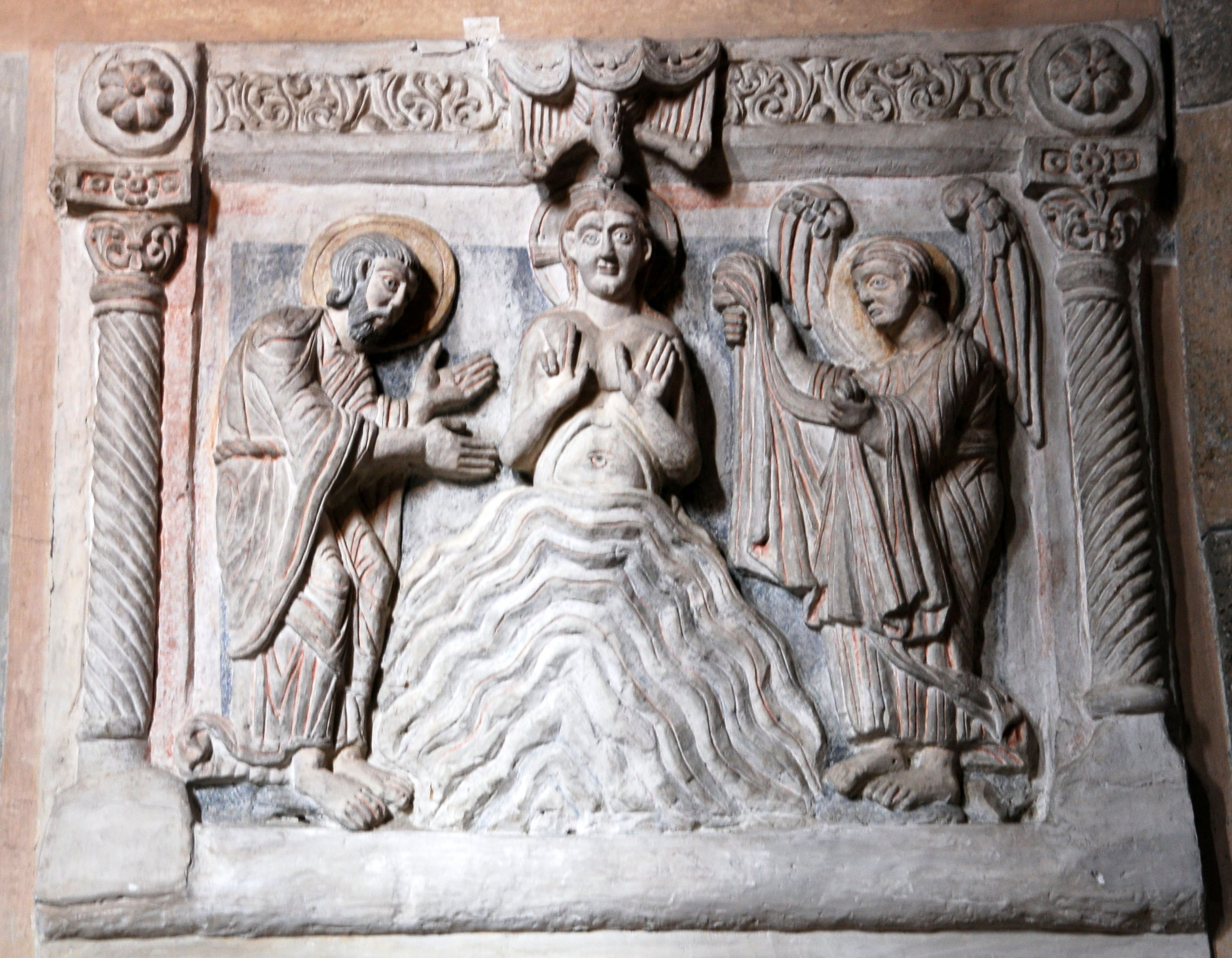
Stucco relief on the north wall of the abbey church

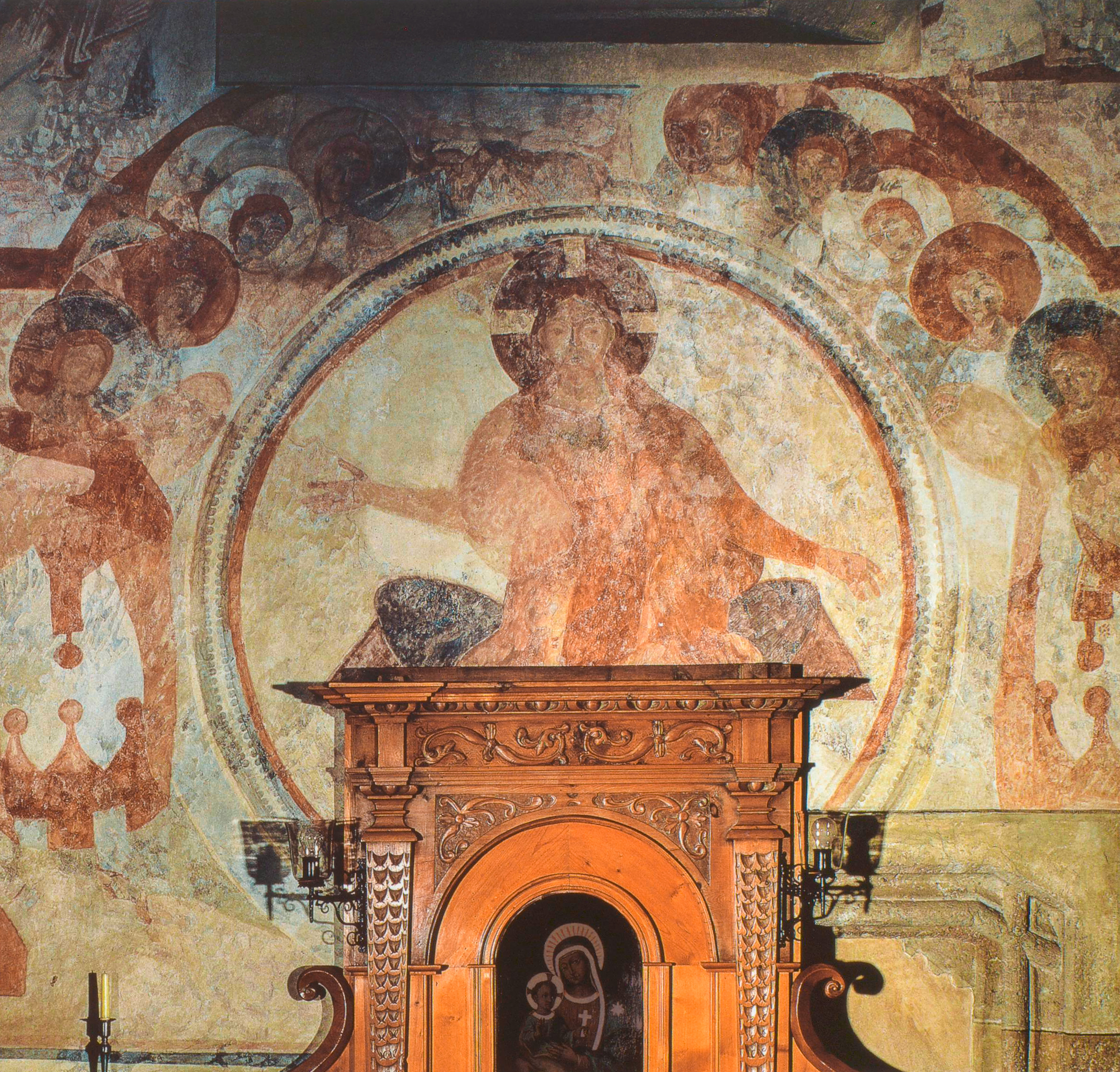
Last Judgment of Müstair

== See also ==
- Iconography of Charlemagne
