= Adele aus der Ohe =

German concert pianist and composer

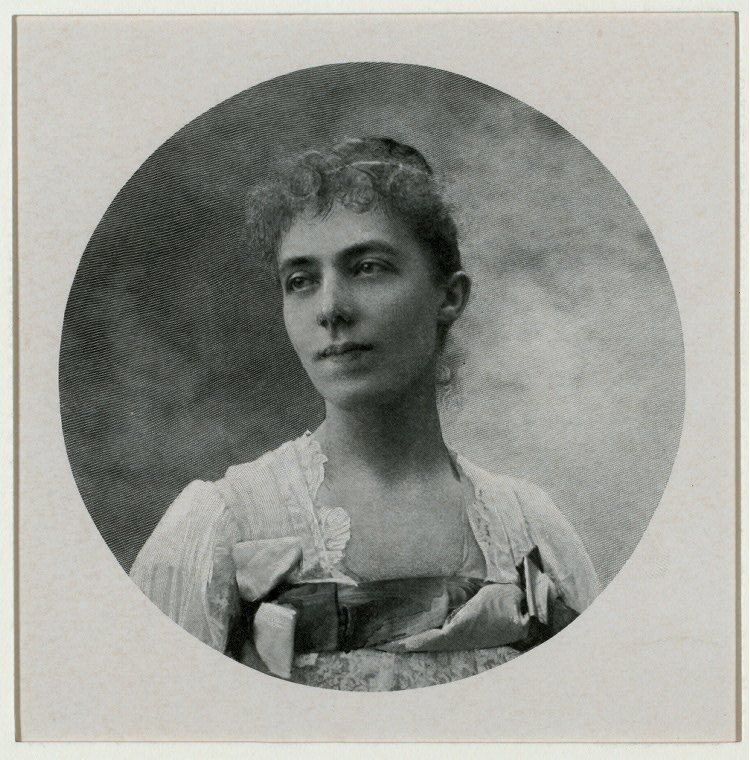
- Adele aus der Ohe

Background information
- Born: 11 February 1861; Hanover, Kingdom of Hanover
- Died: 8 December 1937 (aged 76) Berlin, Germany
- Genre: Classical
- Occupations: Pianist, composer

Adele (Adelheit Johanne Auguste Hermine) aus der Ohe (11 February 1861 – 8 December 1937) was a German concert pianist and composer. (Note: The church baptismal records from Hannover confirm the date of 11 February 1861.) Her compositions were published by G. Schirmer Inc.

== Life ==
Adele aus der Ohe was born in Hanover. She initially studied with Theodor Kullak, where American pianist and chronicler Amy Fay heard her playing. Calling her "a little fairy of a scholar, ten years old," Fay wrote: "I heard her play a concerto of Beethoven the other day with orchestral accompaniment and a great cadenza by Moscheles, absolutely perfectly. She never missed a note all the way through."

Aus der Ohe was one of the few child prodigies accepted as a pupil by Franz Liszt; she began studying with him at the age of 12 and stayed with him for seven years (1877–1884), making her American debut playing his First Piano Concerto in the Steinway Hall in New York on 23 December 1886. She promoted Liszt's music throughout her career; Richard Watson Gilder wrote a poem about such interpretations.

Aus der Ohe was also a friend of Pyotr Ilyich Tchaikovsky, whose First Piano Concerto she performed under the composer's baton at the inaugural concert of Carnegie Hall in New York, as well as at his final concert in St. Petersburg, where the Pathétique Symphony was premiered.

She subsequently settled in the United States, touring there for seventeen consecutive seasons. She returned to Germany in 1906 and died in Berlin in 1937.

== Compositional style ==
Adele aus der Ohe was highly endowed and had a distinctive degree of temperament as a pianist. As already mentioned by magazines and music journals of her time, she was successful not only as such, but also as a composer, as appropriately described in a concert review from Hamburg in January 1910, where she was also honoured by the work she had performed.

Between 1895 and 1906, her name appeared regularly in the renowned publishers catalogue of G. Schirmer (New York) and Ries & Erler (Berlin). Among her compositions are numerous songs, some with words by Richard Watson Gilder (1844–1909), several piano works, and duets for violin and piano. And although further prints after 1906 are not available, a note in the Neue Zeitschrift für Musik suggests that after her retreat from the American musical life, she continued her composing work.

== Repertoire ==
Aus der Ohe's repertory was large and included both Brahms concertos, the second of which she played as early as 1899 in Boston. She specialized in large-scale works; a typical program she played in Boston consisted of Beethoven's Waldstein Sonata, Chopin's Funeral March Sonata, Schumann's Fantasie in C and Liszt's Réminiscences de Don Juan.

== Works for piano ==
Title	Opus	Number	Key	Words	Year	Publishing
Four songs from The new day	1	The birds were singing	—	Richard Watson Gilder	1895	G. Schirmer
Four songs from The new day	1	A birthday song	—	Richard Watson Gilder	1895	G. Schirmer
Four songs from The new day	1	Not from the whole wide World	—	Richard Watson Gilder	1895	G. Schirmer
Four songs from The new day	1	Thistle-down	—	Richard Watson Gilder	1895	G. Schirmer
Suite No. 1 for Piano	2	Bourrée	—	—	1895	G. Schirmer
Suite No. 1 for Piano	2	Sarabande	—	—	1895	G. Schirmer
Suite No. 1 for Piano	2	Menuet	—	—	1895	G. Schirmer
Suite No. 1 for Piano	2	Gavotte	—	—	1895	G. Schirmer
Konzertetüde No. 1 für Klavier	3	—	C major	—	1895	G. Schirmer
Compositions for the Piano	4	Melody	F major	—	1897	G. Schirmer
Compositions for the Piano	4	Slumber Song	—	—	1897	G. Schirmer
Compositions for the Piano	4	Rustic Dance	—	—	1897	G. Schirmer
Five Songs for Soprano or Tenor	5	Rose-dark the solemn Sunset	—	Richard Watson Gilder	1897	G. Schirmer
Five Songs for Soprano or Tenor	5	After Sorrow's Night	F minor	Richard Watson Gilder	1897	G. Schirmer
Five Songs for Soprano or Tenor	5	Cradle-song	—	Richard Watson Gilder	1897	G. Schirmer
Five Songs for Soprano or Tenor	5	I care not if the Skies are white	—	Richard Watson Gilder	1897	G. Schirmer
Five Songs for Soprano or Tenor	5	Winds to the silent Morn	—	Richard Watson Gilder	1897	G. Schirmer
Two Songs with Piano Accompaniment	6	The Orphans	—	Adelbert von Chamisso	1897	G. Schirmer
Two Songs with Piano Accompaniment	6	I grieve to see these Tears	—	Robert Underwood Johnson	1897	G. Schirmer
Two Songs with Piano Accompaniment	7	I begged a Kiss from a little Maid	—	Robert Underwood Johnson	1897	G. Schirmer
Two Songs with Piano Accompaniment	7	Some said they did but play at War	—	Robert Underwood Johnson	1897	G. Schirmer
Suite No. 2 in E major	8	Prelude	—	—	—	Ries & Erler
Suite No. 2 in E major	8	Sarabande	—	—	—	Ries & Erler
Suite No. 2 in E major	8	à la Bourrée	—	—	—	Ries & Erler
Suite No. 2 in E major	8	Air	—	—	—	Ries & Erler
Suite No. 2 in E major	8	Gavotte	—	—	—	Ries & Erler
Suite No. 2 in E major	8	Gigue	—	—	—	Ries & Erler
Vier Klavierstücke	9	Eine Sage	—	—	1901	Ries & Erler
Vier Klavierstücke	9	Walzer	—	—	1901	Ries & Erler
Vier Klavierstücke	9	Novelette	—	—	1901	Ries & Erler
Vier Klavierstücke	9	Spinnlied	—	—	1901	Ries & Erler
Two Pieces for Piano	10	Melodie	—	—	1902	G. Schirmer
Two Pieces for Piano	10	Berceuse	—	—	1902	G. Schirmer
Mazurka	11	—	—	—	1902	G. Schirmer
Three Pieces for Violin and Piano	12	Mazurka	—	—	1903	G. Schirmer
Three Pieces for Violin and Piano	12	Romanze	—	—	1903	G. Schirmer
Three Pieces for Violin and Piano	12	Elfe Tanzt (Dancing Elf)	—	—	1903	G. Schirmer
Konzertetüde No. 2 für Klavier	13	Am Springbrunnen; eine Erinnerung an die Villa d'Este	—	—	1906	G. Schirmer
Fünf Klavierstücke	14	Morgenliedchen	—	—	1906	G. Schirmer
Fünf Klavierstücke	14	Pastorale	—	—	1906	G. Schirmer
Fünf Klavierstücke	14	Walzer	—	—	1906	G. Schirmer
Fünf Klavierstücke	14	Lustiges Intermezzo	—	—	1906	G. Schirmer
Fünf Klavierstücke	14	Am Sommerabend	—	—	1906	G. Schirmer
Concerto for Piano and Orchestra	15	—	—	—	—	—
Sonata for Violin and Piano	16	—	F-sharp major	—	1906	G. Schirmer
Suite for Piano	WoO	—	B minor	—	1910	Printing unknown
