= Adèle Bourgeois =

Canadian author (1870–1935)

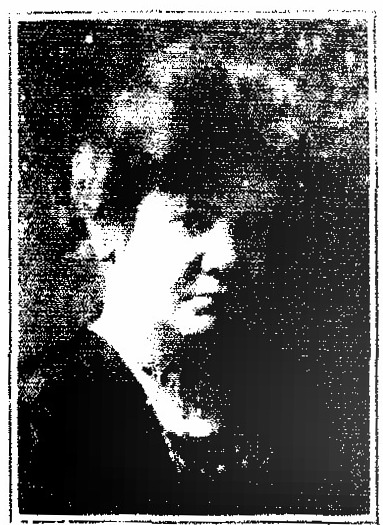
- Bourgeois in 1920
- Born: Emma-Adèle Bourgeois; 5 June 1870; Saint-Hyacinthe, Quebec, Canada
- Died: 21 May 1935 (aged 64); Ottawa, Ontario, Canada
- Burial place: Yamachiche, Quebec
- Education: Hochelaga convent, Montreal
- Occupations: Writer, composer and librettist
- Spouse: Alidé Lacerte

Adèle Bourgeois or Adèle Bourgeois-Lacerte (1870–1935) was a French-Canadian writer, composer and librettist who wrote novels, plays, collections of stories, poems, operettas, skits and musical pieces. She signed many of her works using the pseudonyms "A.B. Lacerte" or "Léda." In a 1935 paper, she was recognized as "the figurehead of the publisher's [Éditions Édouard Garand] sentimental genre, aimed at the French-Canadian public."

== Biography ==
Emma-Adèle Bourgeois was born on 5 June 1870 in Saint-Hyacinthe, Quebec, Canada. Her parents were Frances Gilson and Jean-Baptiste Bourgeois, a lawyer and later a judge. Adèle Bourgeois began her studies with the Ursuline nuns in Trois-Rivières, and finished them at the Hochelaga convent in Montreal.

After she married Alidé Lacerte in 1891, the couple moved to Ottawa, where she spent the rest of her life, publishing her works in French under the pseudonym A.B. Lacerte (or simply AB Lacerte). She devoted her free time to literature, publishing novels, short stories, poems and plays, and even composing an operetta in Italian.

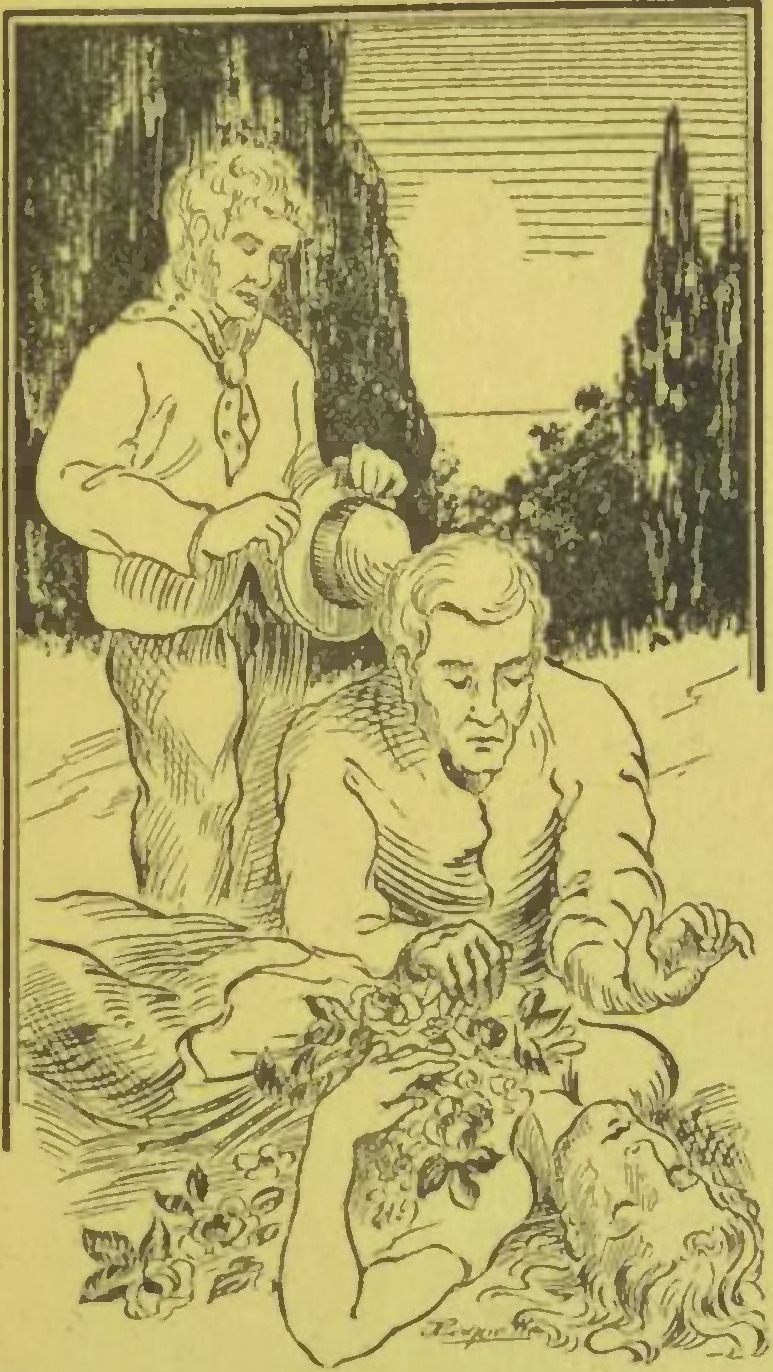
Illustration from her 1932 book, In Pursuit of a Hat.

In 1915, she published Tales and Legends, a children's collection of 19 tales and 27 legends, with poems and prose. Sometimes using the pseudonyms Léda and Magdaléna, she contributed to several French-Canadian newspapers and periodicals, including Le Pays Laurentien, La Revue Nationale, and La Presse.

Her musical contributions were significant. She composed 83 musical pieces, including six operettas, twelve waltzes for piano and 46 vocal pieces, several of which appeared between 1915 and 1933 in the French-Canadian literary and musical magazine Le Passe-Temps.

Adèle Bourgeois died in Ottawa on 21 May 1935, and was buried in Yamachiche, Quebec, with her husband, who predeceased her in 1933.

== Gallery of works ==
Némoville, published in 1917

La Gardienne du Phare, published in 1921

L'ange de la caverne, published in 1922

Roxanne, published in 1924

A la poursuite d'un chapeau, published in 1932
