= M. Adelle Hazlett =

Women's suffrage leader (1837–1911)

- Born: 1837; Wheatland, Michigan
- Died: May 17, 1911 (aged 73–74); Addison, Michigan
- Education: Hillsdale College
- Organization: North Western Women's Suffrage Association
- Known for: Speeches advocating for women's rights
- Movement: Women's suffrage

Mary Adelle Hazlett (1837 – May 17, 1911) was an American suffragist who was elected the president of the North Western Women's Suffrage Association in 1870. From the late 1860s to the 1870s, she was said to be involved in secret societies in the Michigan area. Aligning herself with the Republican Party, Hazlett traveled through the United States, giving speeches advocating for women's rights and Republican candidates. She appeared at several women's rights conventions during the 1870s, such as the Second Decade Meeting for the national women's rights movement, the Allen County Suffrage Society Convention, and the Michigan Convention, appearing alongside other women's suffragists like Elizabeth Cady Stanton. During 1886, she was an orator for Republican presidential candidate James Blaine and vice-presidential candidate John Logan. She was appointed postmistress in the Michigan Legislature in 1893 and continued to make speeches throughout the early 1890s. In 1911, Hazlett died at her niece's house in Addison, Michigan.

== Early life ==
Born the third child out of 7 in Wheatland, Michigan, Adelle Hazlett was exposed to feminist sentiments at her time at Hillsdale College and Albion College. Marrying Mark Hazlett on May 1, 1858, the couple moved to Hillsdale, Michigan shortly after, where she would become most notable. She aligned herself with the Republican Party and advocated for them through speeches.

== Secret society ==
Adelle Hazlett was an advocate for secret societies like the Freemasons. In 1867, the 5th volume of The Voice of Masonry and Tidings from the Craft, wrote that Adele Hazlett was giving a lecture entitled, "Secret Societies, Ancient and Modern." They also quote a contemporary who claimed that Hazlett was known as "the Champion Advocate of Secret Societies." She was also said to participate in secret societies, as later in 1874, The Knoxville Journal claimed that, "The Order of the Temple" was formed by Hazlett as a secret society for women. Three years later in 1877, she was said to have joined the "Sacred Temple," another women's society. Sacred Temple resembled freemasonry in terms of the way that it was organized but its mission was "intellectual and moral improvement of women."

== Activism (1870s–90s) ==
=== Speech endorsing women's enfranchisement 1871 ===
At the Second Decade Meeting in 1871 for the national women's rights movement, Adelle Hazlett was among several other well-known women's rights speakers from around the country, such as Elizabeth Cady Stanton, Susan B. Anthony, and Lucretia Mott. Hazlett made a speech in Apollo Hall calling for women's suffrage. Using rhetorical questions about disrespect and injustice, Hazlett used this speech to support her fight for suffrage. Hazlett compares women to paupers and men to enslavers to make the point on women's disenfranchisement. The speech also compared women's status at the time to that of a caged bird and made the argument that a bird's nature does not change while being free. Hazlett stated,

"The men of this Republic thus declare themselves the champions of liberty. But what of one half of America's own citizens? Bow your heads, oh ye law-makers, and blush for shame that ye place the crown of citizenship upon the brows of men, who are the off-shoots, the dregs, the scum of European Dynasties; yet practically say your own wives and daughters are not worthy to wear it! They have helped you to conquer independence, to protect if from rebellion and treason, and this is their reward."

Hazlett earned herself a reputation for being an impactful orator. The Chicago Tribune reported that Hazlett was the "brightest speaker of the convention," because of this speech.

=== Allen County Suffrage Society convention of 1871 ===
Beulah and Lindley Ninde, temperance and women's rights activists, formed the Allen County Suffrage Society in 1871. The convention that followed in March promoted women's rights and saw suffrage as a solution to women's disenfranchisement. Catharine Waite, a Chicago women's rights activist and journalist, spoke with Adelle Hazlett on equal opportunities for women. They argued that equal rights for women would not disrupt the women's domestic role in society but that they would allow women a way to support themselves. While the convention was successful with a large turnout, they were still met with resistance as Hazlett had expected.

=== Michigan convention of 1874 ===
In 1867, Michigan nearly granted women the right to vote but failed to pass it on a second vote. The question was brought back to public attention when Michigan delegates made women's suffrage a separate ballot question. Tension began to rise between suffrage movement leaders as suffragists from outside of Michigan came to help campaign for the passage of the ballot question. Since the beginning of the women's rights movement in Michigan, homegrown suffragists had led locally. Combining multiple personalities, approaches, and experiences of leaders from national movements complicated the campaign. When Susan B. Anthony attempted to give a speech in Hillsdale, the town Hazlett grew up in, Hazlett did not help organize any of it. After campaigning in the state, Elizabeth Cady Stanton and Susan B. Anthony's actions were not well documented. The belief was that Hazlett had blocked press coverage for the two of them.

== Speeches and political life ==
M. Adelle Hazlett was discussed in newspapers from the Midwest ranging from the 1870s to the 1890s. They announced her upcoming speeches and meetings of the North Western Women's Suffrage Association, to which she was elected the president in 1870. Other speeches were connected to her affiliation with the Republican Party. Though she sometimes claimed to not be partisan, at other times she admitted to having Republican sympathies. In 1876, the Adrian Press accused Hazlett of having been paid to endorse the Republican Party, which she quickly denied in an article in the Hillsdale Standard. Continuing into the 1880s, Hazlett made speeches in favor of Republican candidates. In October of 1886, she was one of the Republican Orators for James Blaine and John Logan's campaign against Grover Cleveland. In 1887, she began holding a position at the general auditor's office. Hazlett was elected the postmistress in 1893 as the Michigan legislature shifted to Republican domination.

== Death ==
Adelle Hazlett had an accidental fall in 1910 and never fully recovered. She eventually died at her niece's house in Addison, Michigan, on May 17, 1911. An article about her death in the Detroit Times described her as a Republican speaker.

== Bibliography ==
- "Bloomingdale Locals." The True Northerner. [Paw Paw, Michigan], 10 August, 1877. Retrieved December 7, 2020,
- Davis, Paulina W, Victoria C Woodhull, Lucy Stone, Susan B. Anthony Collection, and National American Woman Suffrage Association Collection. A National Women's Rights Movement, For Twenty Years. New York: Journeymen Printers' Co-operative Association, 1871. Pdf. .
- "Detroit. The Northwestern Woman's Suffrage Association." Wheeling Daily Register. [Wheeling, West Virginia], 1 December, 1870. Retrieved December 1, 2020, .
- Dewey, Geo M. "The Times., October 03, 1884, Image 2." The Times [Owosso, Michigan], 3 October, 1884. Retrieved December 1, 2020, .
- "Mrs. M. Adele Hazlett Dead." The Detroit Times [Detroit, Michigan], 18 May. 1911, p. 2, .
- Hazlett, Adelle. "M. Adelle Hazlett." The Hillsdale Standard [Hillsdale, Michigan], 28 November, 1876, .
- Hazlett, Adelle. “Speech Endorsing Women’s Enfranchisement.” Speech, Apollo Hall, New York, October 20, 1870. Gifts of Speech.
- "Michigan Legislature." Weekly Expositor [Brockway Center, Michigan], 13 January, 1893, Retrieved December 1, 2020, .
- "Personal and Literary". Knoxville Journal. [Knoxville, Iowa] 2 July, 1874. Retrieved December 7, 2020, .
- Seigel, Peggy. “Winning the Vote in Fort Wayne, Indiana: The Long, Cautious Journey in a German American City.” Indiana Magazine of History 102, no. 3 (2006): 220–257. JSTOR 27792731
- Snodgrass, Mary Ellen. “Hazlett, Adella (1837–1911).” In American Women Speak: An Encyclopedia and Document Collection of Women’s Oratory. 1st vol A-H. Santa Barbara, California: ABC-CLIO, 2016.
- "State News Condensed." Weekly Expositor [Brockway Center, Michigan], 27 January, 1887, .
- Tetrault, Lisa. “The Incorporation of American Feminism: Suffragists and the Postbellum Lyceum.” The Journal of American History 96, no 4 (2010): 1027–1056. JSTOR 40661824
- Tetrault, Lisa. The Myth of Seneca Falls, Memory and the Women’s Suffrage Movement 1848–1898. Chapel Hill: The University of North Carolina Press, 2014.
- The Master Builder. "Clippings from the Quarry." The Voice of Masonry and Tidings from the Craft 5, (1867): 247. .
- "Woman Suffrage." Chicago Tribune [Chicago, Il], 16 January, 1871. Retrieved December 11, 2020, .
