= Adele Raemer =

American-Israeli blogger and educator

- אדל ראמר
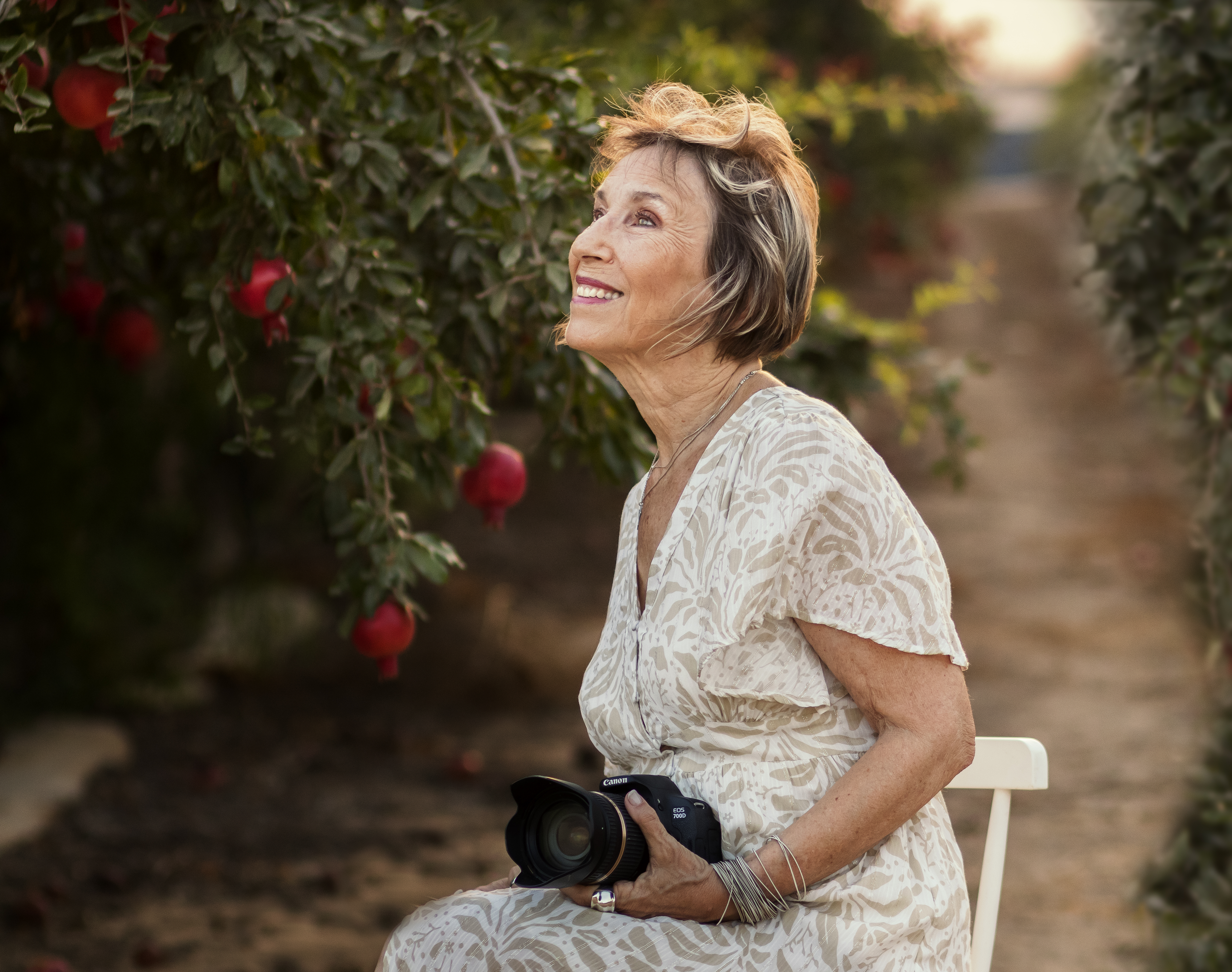
- Born: December 17, 1954 (age 71); The Bronx, New York City
- Citizenship: American–Israeli
- Education: Heriot-Watt University (MATESOL)
- Occupations: EFL teacher, blogger, photographer
- Years active: 1975–2023
- Employer: Israeli Ministry of Education
- Known for: Citizen journalism from Gaza border, testifying at UNHRC and UN Security Council.
- Website: https://blogs.timesofisrael.com/author/adele-raemer/

Adele Raemer (Hebrew: אדל ראמר; born December 17, 1954) is an American–Israeli blogger and educator who is a resident of Nirim, a kibbutz close to Israel's border with the Gaza Strip.

== Early life ==
Raemer is descended from Russian Jews who fled as refugees to the United States.

Raemer grew up in Norwood, a neighborhood of The Bronx in New York City. She was educated in a Zionist Youth Movement, Young Judea and following her high school graduation, in the early 1970s, she went on a gap year program with Young Judea in Israel. After returning to the US, she initially planned to attend NYU and study theatre, but she decided to return to Israel following the outbreak of the Yom Kippur War.

== Life in Israel ==
Raemer made aliyah in August 1973, and within a year was drafted into the Israel Defense Forces. She has lived in kibbutz Nirim since 1975, where she begins teaching that same year. In the early 1980s, Raemer gave birth to her two daughters, Maytal and Lilach, in the kibbutz. She had a son, Adam, from her second marriage.

Raemer was an English teacher for 38 years, before retiring in September 2023. In the 1990s, she worked with some Gazan teachers on cross-cultural programs. Raemer has also worked as a counselor for the Israeli Ministry of Education.

Before 2005, when Israel withdrew from Gaza, Raemer visited regularly to shop at the markets and to visit the beach.

Raemer evacuated from Nirim during Operation Cast Lead in 2008. She remained in the kibbutz during Operation Pillar of Defense in 2012, and during the 2014 Gaza War, in which Raemer's home was damaged. Following the war, she joined the Movement for the Future of the Western Negev, a group pushing for the Israeli government to negotiate a peace with the Gaza Strip.

In 2019 Raemer participated in a cycling marathon organized by the Gaza Youth Committee.

Raemer was in Nirim on October 7, 2023, when it was attacked by Hamas militants. Raemer and her son hid in her home's safe room, while her daughter, son in law and three grandchildren hid in their home's safe rooms. She described hearing rocket impacts and seeing Iron Dome interceptors during the assault. Raemer has said that the October 7 attack was traumatic for her and her community.

Following the attacks, Raemer and her family, together with the rest of her kibbutz population were relocated to a hotel in Eilat. In the middle of February, the members of Kibbutz Nirim decided that to try to preserve the unity of the community, they moved to apartments in Beersheva, where they remain until today until they can return home.

Since the October 7 attacks, Raemer has travelled abroad four different times to share her stories and the stories of her community. She went to the United States in late October with a group of survivors, organized by private US-Israeli businessmen, where she met Senators and Congresspeople. In November, the Israeli Ministry of Foreign Affairs brought her on another delegation to Berlin to speak with lawmakers there. In February 2024, the International Fellowship of Christians and Jews sent her to Nashville, Tennessee to speak with journalists from Evangelical Christian media. She was invited by the Christian Broadcasting Network to the White House Correspondents' Dinner in April as their honored guest. At that time she was interviewed by CBN and Daystar TV. Following that, she participated in the Moral Hearts' Alliance initiative, together with Eagle's Wings in a Solidarity Sunday engagement in the Rock Church and World Outreach Center, telling the stories of October 7th and commemorating Holocaust Remembrance Day.

== Online presence ==
In 2011 Raemer created a Facebook group called Life on the Border With Gaza, in which she and other Israelis share their experiences.

Raemer began blogging for CNN iReport in 2012, during Operation Pillar of Defense. In 2013, Raemer was nominated for a CNN iReport Award. Today she blogs for the Times of Israel.

In 2018 Raemer spoke at the UNHRC's Independent Commission of Inquiry about events that had occurred that year on the Gazan border. She was chosen due to her social media presence, and her posts on and records of the events(including documenting fires caused by incendiary devices). Haaretz named her one of the "10 Jewish Faces Who Made Waves in 2018" for her testimony.

In 2019 Raemer testified to the United Nations Security Council about the events of Operation Protective Edge in 2014 and life on the border. Raemer still believes that there are "good Gazans" in Gaza who do wish to collaborate and live as good neighbors, but tragically, far fewer than she believed before.

In a 2024 interview with Hungarian Conservative, Raemer said she became more skeptical about the possibility of peace with Hamas and the PLO after October 7, stating that fewer Gazans than she had previously believed were willing to live as neighbors with Israelis. She said Israel should maintain security control along the Gaza border. Raemer continues to write for the Times of Israel about life on the border and the October 7 attacks.

== Personal life ==
Raemer has two children from her first marriage (Maytal and Lilach), and another from her second (Adam), from which she inherited a stepson (Daniel). Raemer's second husband, Laurie, died by suicide in 2008. She has 8 grandchildren, all of whom live in Israel.
