= Adele Kurzweil =

Austrian Jewish girl and Holocaust victim

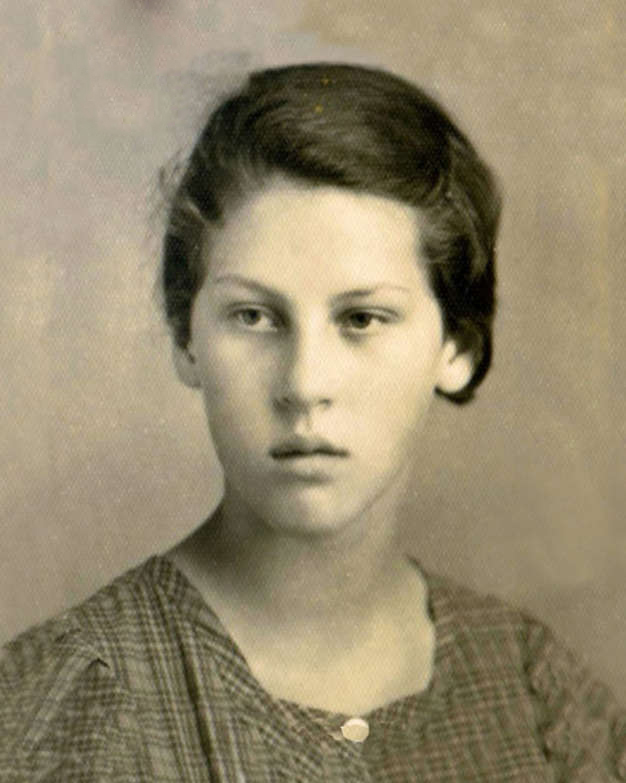
- Photo from Adele's passport (taken in September 1938)
- Born: 31 January 1925; Graz, Styria, Austria
- Died: 9 September 1942 (aged 17); Auschwitz concentration camp, Poland

Adele "Dele" Kurzweil (31 January 1925 – 9 September 1942) was an Austrian girl of Jewish origin who was tracked down by Nazi Germany and murdered in Auschwitz concentration camp at arrival. Her fate became widely known after suitcases had been discovered in 1990 at her family's last refuge in the southern French town of Auvillar.

== Biography ==
=== Childhood in Graz ===
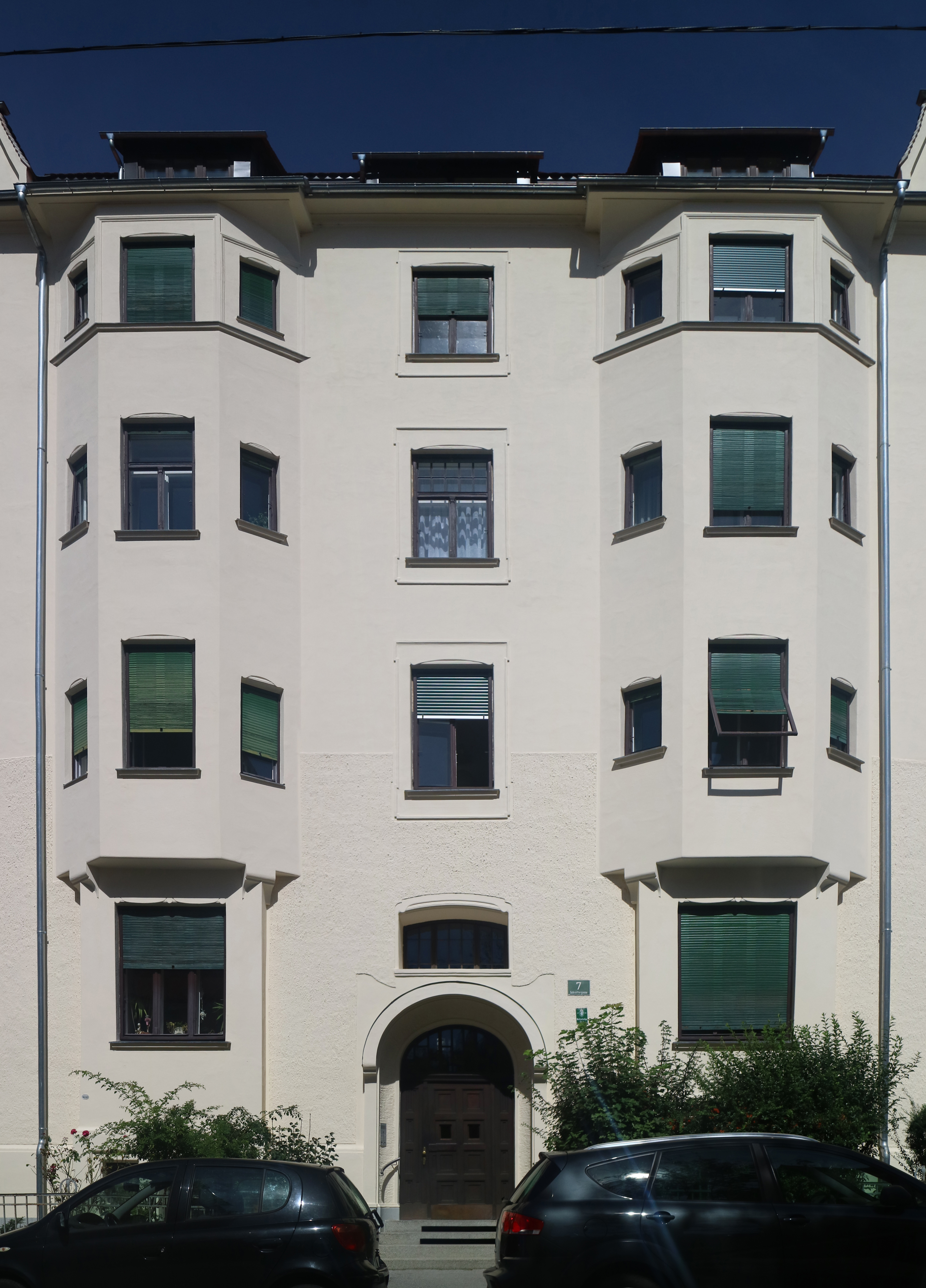
The building where the Kurzweil family was living

Adele Kurzweil was born in the Styrian capital Graz as sole child of social-democratic lawyer Bruno Kurzweil (born 1891 in Josefov Fortress, Bohemia) and his wife Gisela Trammer (born 1900 in Bohumín), both of Jewish descent. In mid-1926 both mother and daughter left the Jewish community, a move the father had already made 14 years ago. Named after her grandmother, Adele grew up well protected in a house in the district of Geidorf. Photos taken in the years 1928 and 1929 show her with children of the same age playing in the family's garden located about a mile from their home. The neighbor's garden which was also a popular playground was dubbed a "children's paradise" by friends of the Kurzweil family. (Note: The biographical text by Heimo Halbrainer is based on several files from the estate of Muriel Gardiner. These have been archived in the Documentation Centre of Austrian Resistance under the numbers 18.882, 18.884 and 18.886. Other sources include the archive of the jewish community Graz as well as documents of the Kurzweil family found in their suitcases that nowadays can be found at the Musée de la résistance et de la déportation in Montauban.)

Adele, called Dele by her friends, went to elementary school (Volksschule) near her family's flat and to girls' school (Oberlyzeum) in the city's old town until her emigration in 1938. Though the family got under pressure because of the Nuremberg Laws, entries in her friendship book show that teachers and classmates were still feeling sympathy for her. Late Harvard graduate and sociologist Hanna Papanek (1927–2017) who got to know Adele in Paris described her as "calm and more introverted".

=== Emigration and murder ===
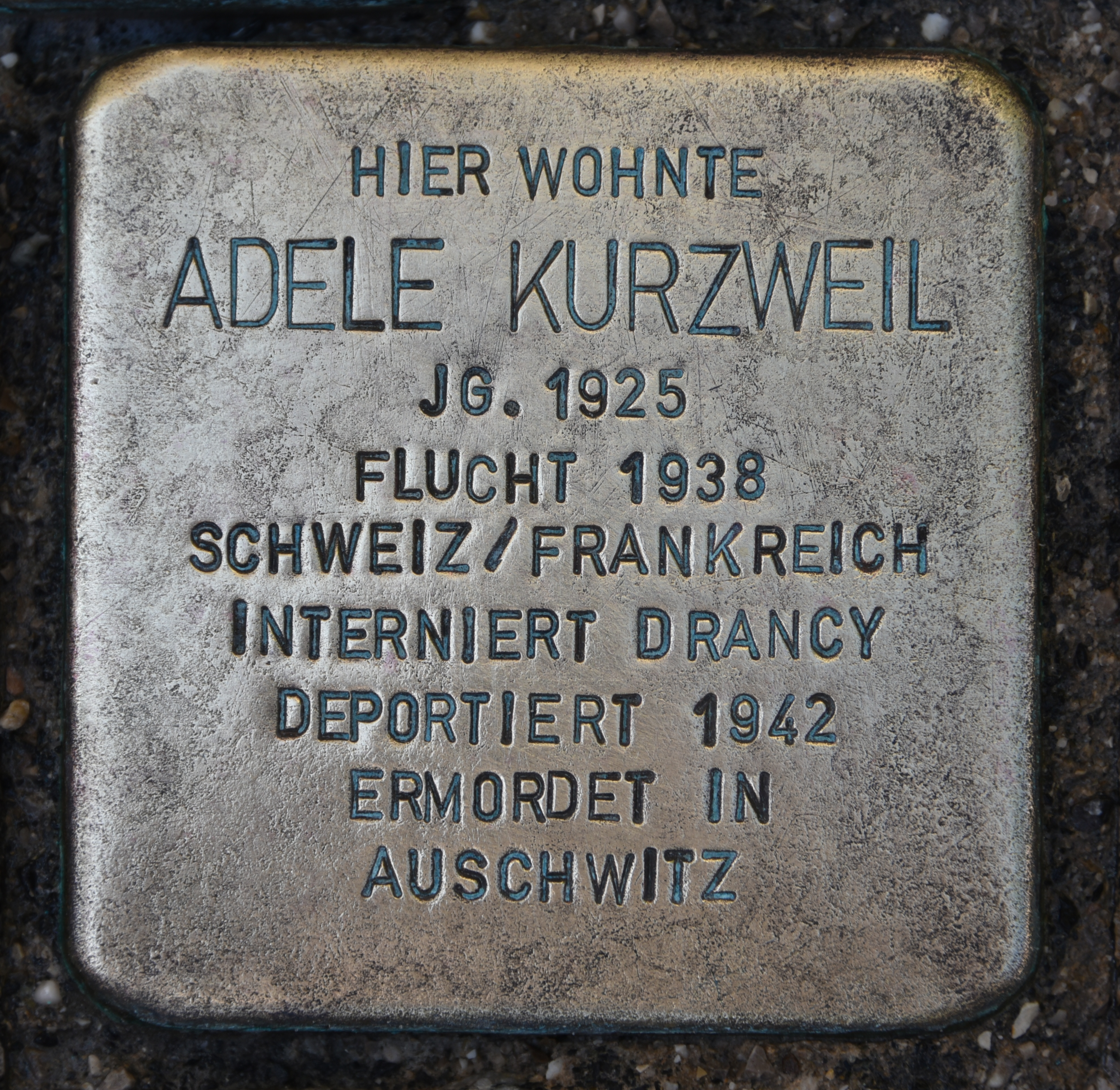
Stolperstein in Graz

Bruno Kurzweil who had been serving as a lawyer for the Social Democratic Party for many years received a professional ban by June 1938. After Adele had finished her term the family left the country and travelled through Switzerland all the way to Paris, France. Around Christmas 1938 a youth group called "Freundschaft" (friendship) was formed within the social-democratic mission in Paris that held weekly gatherings. The following summer Adele spent one month with 13 other children and youths born between 1924 and 1930 in a hostel in Le Plessis-Robinson. According to Hanna Papanek the group members took trips in the near surroundings and learned about Marxist theories. Following the begin of World War II Bruno Kurzweil was temporarily interned in a camp in Meslay-du-Maine. Meanwhile Adele was sent to a children's refugee camp in Montmorency led by the Œuvre de secours aux enfants and went to fourth grade. Mother Gisela stayed in Paris, but kept corresponding with her daughter. Starting in February 1940 the girl finished her letters with the sentences "Furthermore nothing new with us but a lot in the world. Still, I am convinced that everything will be fine."

Reunited, the Kurzweil family followed the social-democratic mission to the south of the country and settled in Montauban where they were registered as refugees from Paris. While her father was helping many of his comrades by organizing exit visas to the United States and Mexico, Adele was welcoming new refugees at the town's railway station. With the so-called Final Solution in sight, the German authorities enforced the search for Jewish refugees in Vichy France and eventually tracked down Adele and her parents. On 26 August 1942 Bruno, Gisela and Adele Kurzweil were arrested in Auvillar alongside 120 other persons and interned in a camp in Septfonds. In early September the family was transferred to Drancy internment camp. On 9 September they were finally deported to Auschwitz concentration camp and murdered at arrival.

== The suitcase of Adele Kurzweil ==
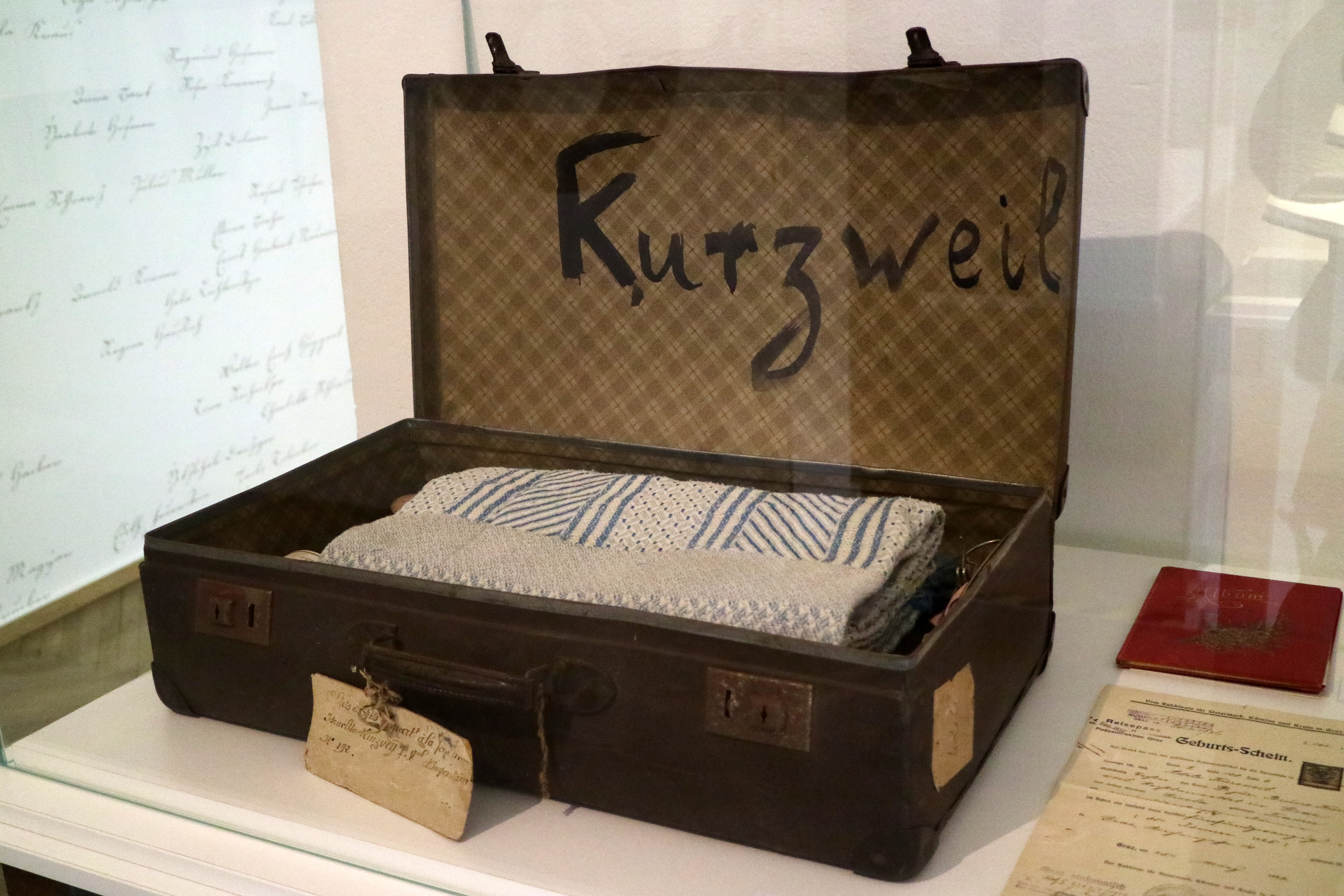
One of the suitcases in the historical museum of Graz (2019)

In 1990 a student of History at University of Toulouse-Jean Jaurès discovered several suitcases and other objects including furniture and a cabinet trunk at Auvillar police station. The suitcases contained passports and other important papers as well as commodities like toothbrushes and towels. After the war the objects had been stored at a depot of the municipal office for decades. Local historians Pascal Caila and Jacques Latu were able to reconstruct the Kurzweil family story based on the documents they found. All documents were handed for preservation purposes to the Musée de la résistance et de la deportation (museum of resistance and deportation) in Montauban where the family had been living between 1940 und 1942.

A history teacher at the Montauban Lycée Michelet initiated a project focusing on the topics of Holocaust and persecution of minorities in 1994. Her students created an exhibition about Adele Kurzweil and eventually got the schoolyard named after the girl. They received the Sorbonne's Prix Corrin for their achievement. The students subsequently cooperated with colleagues in Graz which led to another project in Adele's hometown including archive research plus conversations with Holocaust survivors. The result was an exhibition in the Graz synagogue that was established in November 2001 and became so popular that it was exported to several locations all over Austria.

The pedagogue Peter Gstettner called the suitcases as a whole – they are often summarized as "Koffer der Adele Kurzweil" (suitcase of Adele Kurzweil) – a cultural relict that is a glimpse into the personal context of the escape and thus a valuable contribution to collective memory. The contents of Kurzweil's suitcase illustrate the violence of the refugee and deportation experience. According to Gstettner relicts like these deliver an educational valuable, emotional and personalized approach to the crimes of Nazism.

=== Reception ===
In the years after its historical processing the fate of Adele Kurzweil became a popular model for artistic works. In 2009 German writer Manfred Theisen dedicated a novel to Adele with the title "Der Koffer der Adele Kurzweil" in which he combined the real background of the girl with a fictitious story. Ruth Kaufmann, president of the society for Holocaust remembrance and tolerance promotion, published a variation of Adele's life story the form of a diary.

Based on Theisen's book he and Thilo Reffert wrote a play that premiered on 24 January 2020 at the children and youth theater stage in Graz.

In remembrance of Adele Kurzweil a Stolperstein was paved in front of her Graz home in 2014.

== Bibliography ==
- Ehetreiber, Christian; Halbrainer, Heimo; Ramp, Bettina, eds. (2001). Der Koffer der Adele Kurzweil. Auf den Spuren einer Grazer jüdischen Familie in der Emigration (in German). Graz: CLIO. ISBN 3-9500971-2-0.
- Ehetreiber, Christian; Ramp, Bettina; Ulrych, Sarah, eds. (2009). … und Adele Kurzweil und … Fluchtgeschichte(n) 1938 bis 2008 (in German). Graz: CLIO. ISBN 978-3-902542-19-9.
- Kaufmann, Ruth (2018). Im Netz der Ameisenspinne: Adeles Tagebuch (in German). Createspace Independent Publishing Platform. ISBN 978-1-72974-547-2.
- Theisen, Manfred (2009). Der Koffer der Adele Kurzweil (in German). Aarau: Sauerländer. ISBN 978-3-7941-8089-9.
