= Adele DeLeeuw =

American-Dutch children's story writer

- Born: 1899; Hamilton, Ohio, US
- Died: June 11, 1988 (aged 88–89)
- Occupation: Author
- Notable work: Nurses Who Led the Way

Adele DeLeeuw (pronounced Lew-oo; 1899–1988) was an American–Dutch children's story writer. The New York Times attributes more than 75 children's book to her.

== Biography ==
She was a native of Ohio. She graduated from Hartridge School for Girls in 1918. In her adult life, moved to Plainfield, New Jersey. Here, she worked as a librarian and then as a secretary to her father from 1919 to 1926.

== Legacy ==
After her death she bequeathed her estate to the Plainfield Foundation which in turn generated a scholarship fund for students seeking post-secondary education in the Humanities and Sciences. Members of the Rotary Club of the Plainfields took on the responsibility of managing the selection of scholarship recipients and presenting those awards. DeLeeuw managed to bequeath a total of US$1,000,000 for that cause. Every year since, there has been a scholarship award ceremony. As of 2019, the fund has granted more than the original $1 million bequest, which continues to grow.

After her sister Cateau died, she wrote a book Remembered with Love: Letters to my Sister. The book is a series of chapters for each month of the year. In it, Adele writes to Cateau with remembrances of their lives together and expresses her heartfelt love for the sister she sorely misses. It gives a snapshot of their lives together and is among her last and most important books.

Besides the books mentioned above Adele DeLeeuw has written many children's books about folktales and historical figures like Legends and Folk Tales of Holland, and Anthony Wayne Washington's General.

== Selected works ==
- Remembered with Love: Letters to my Sister. ISBN 0-912650-03-6
- Nurses Who Led the Way. DeLeeuw, Adele & DeLeeuw, Cateau. (1961). Racine, Wisconsin: Whitman Pub. Co.
