= André Caby =

French swimmer

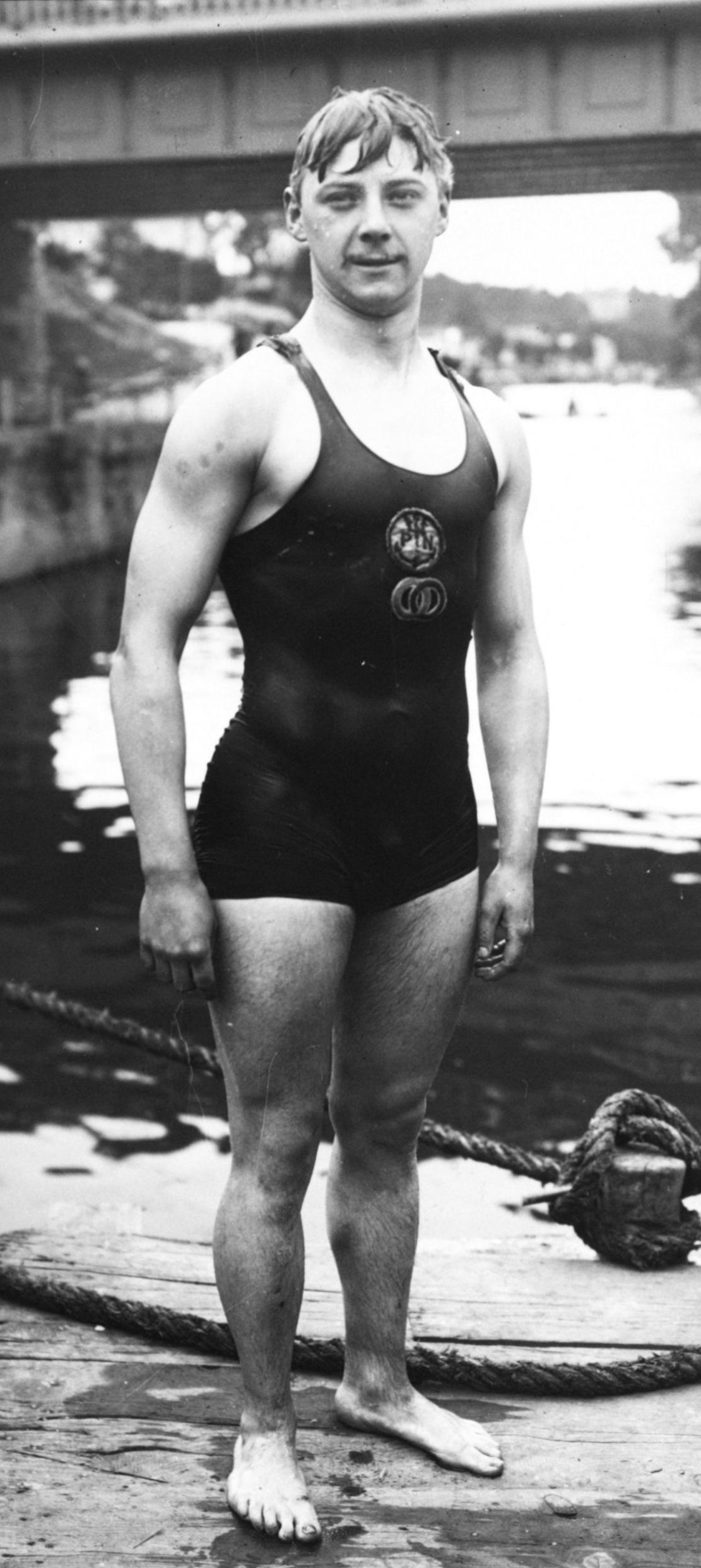
- André Caby in 1912

Personal information
- Born: 15 March 1892 Beauvais, France
- Died: 15 February 1915 (aged 22)

Sport
- Sport: Swimming
- Club: PN Lille

André Caby (15 March 1892 – 15 February 1915) was a French freestyle swimmer. He competed in the 1500 m event at the 1912 Summer Olympics, but failed to reach the final.
