= Adelheid (abbess of Müstair) =

13th century Swiss nun

Adelheid (attested from 1211 to 1233) was abbess of the Benedictine monastery of Saint John Abbey, Müstair, in what is now Switzerland. She is the first abbess of that monastery known by name.

According to 15th century tradition, she belonged to the noble family of von Neiffen. Under her leadership, a blood miracle made the abbey a pilgrimage site, and the hospice of Santa Maria Val Müstair was constructed.
