= Adele Garrison =

American writer

Adele Garrison was the pen name of Nana Belle Springer White (1873 in Clinton Junction, Wisconsin – 1956), an American writer. Her daily newspaper column, a serial story called Revelations of a Wife, ran in multiple American newspapers from 1915 until the Depression.

== Biography ==
Nana Springer White was born in Clinton Junction, Wisconsin. Her career included time as a schoolteacher in Milwaukee. She later worked as an editor for the Milwaukee Sentinel and then a reporter and writer for the Chicago Examiner and the Chicago American. She had one son and one daughter.

Revelations of a Wife told the story of the marital ups and downs of Margaret "Madge" Graham, an independent-minded former schoolteacher, and her husband Dicky, an artist. At the height of the story's popularity, it had one million regular readers.
