= Adèle Bayer =

Belgian missionary

Adèle Parmentier Bayer
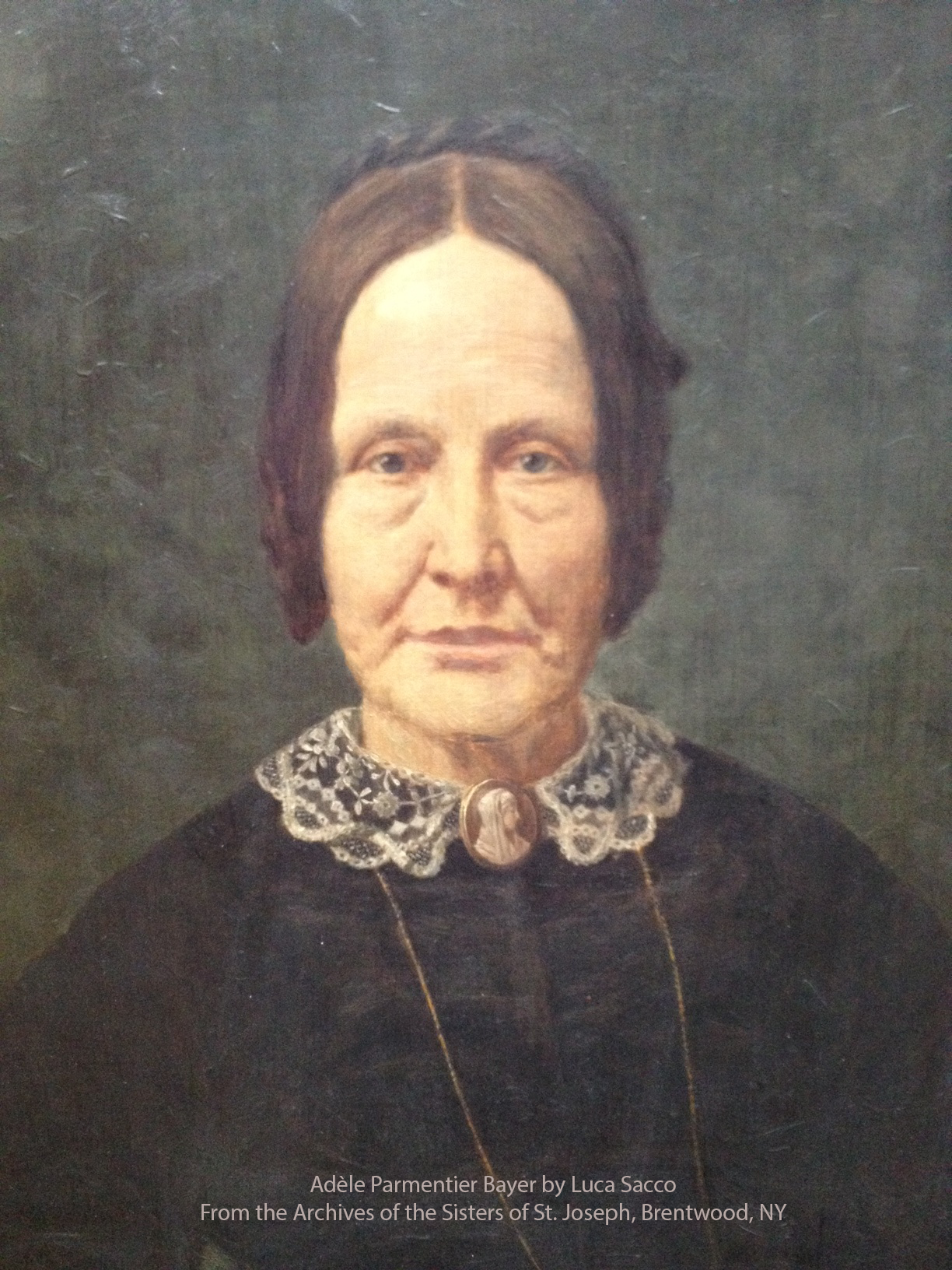
- Painting by Luca Sacco, courtesy of the Sisters of St. Joseph, Brentwood, NY

Adèle Bayer (née Parmentier; 4 July 1814 – 22 January 1892) was a philanthropist who was active in both missionary work to Native Americans and seafarers missions.

== Biography ==
Adèle Bayer was the eldest daughter of Andrew Parmentier (born at Enghien, Belgium, July 3, 1780, and died in Brooklyn, New York, November 26, 1830), a horticulturist and civil engineer. His father, Andrew Joseph Parmentier, was a wealthy linen merchant, and his eldest brother Joseph had a European repute as a horticulturist and landscape gardener. Trained by the latter, Andrew emigrated to New York in 1824, on his way to the West Indies, taking with him his share of the family estate. He was persuaded by friends to remain in New York as a place where his abilities and scientific training would meet with recognition. He purchased a tract of land near Brooklyn which he laid out as a horticultural park. It became famous in a short time and his services as an expert in designing pleasure grounds were sought for in many places North and South. He is said to have exercised a more potent influence in landscape gardening in the United States than any other person of his profession up to that time. He was the first to introduce into the United States the black beech tree and several varieties of shrubs, vegetables, and vines. He was one of the founders and trustees of St. James's, the first Catholic church in the present Diocese of Brooklyn, and was at the height of his influence and repute when he died in Brooklyn, 26 November, 1830.

After the death of Andrew Parmentier, his daughter Adèle and her mother (Sylvia M., born in Louvain, Belgium, 1793; died in Brooklyn, New York, April 27, 1882), carried on his Botanical and Horticultural Gardens until 1832, when they were sold. Thereafter they devoted most of their time and income to works of charity, aided substantially the Indian missions of Father De Smet, S.J., the establishment in Indiana of the Sisters of Providence from Brittany, the Little Sisters of the Poor in Brooklyn, and other good works. Adèle was married, September 8, 1841, to Edward Bayer, a German Catholic merchant (d. 3 Feb., 1894), at the first nuptial Mass celebrated in Brooklyn. During the Civil War Madame Bayer began caring for the spiritual and temporal wants of the sailors at the Brooklyn Navy Yard, a work to which she devoted the remainder of her life. For thirty years she toiled unostentatiously at this voluntary task and was known and revered as a guardian and friend by seamen all over the world.

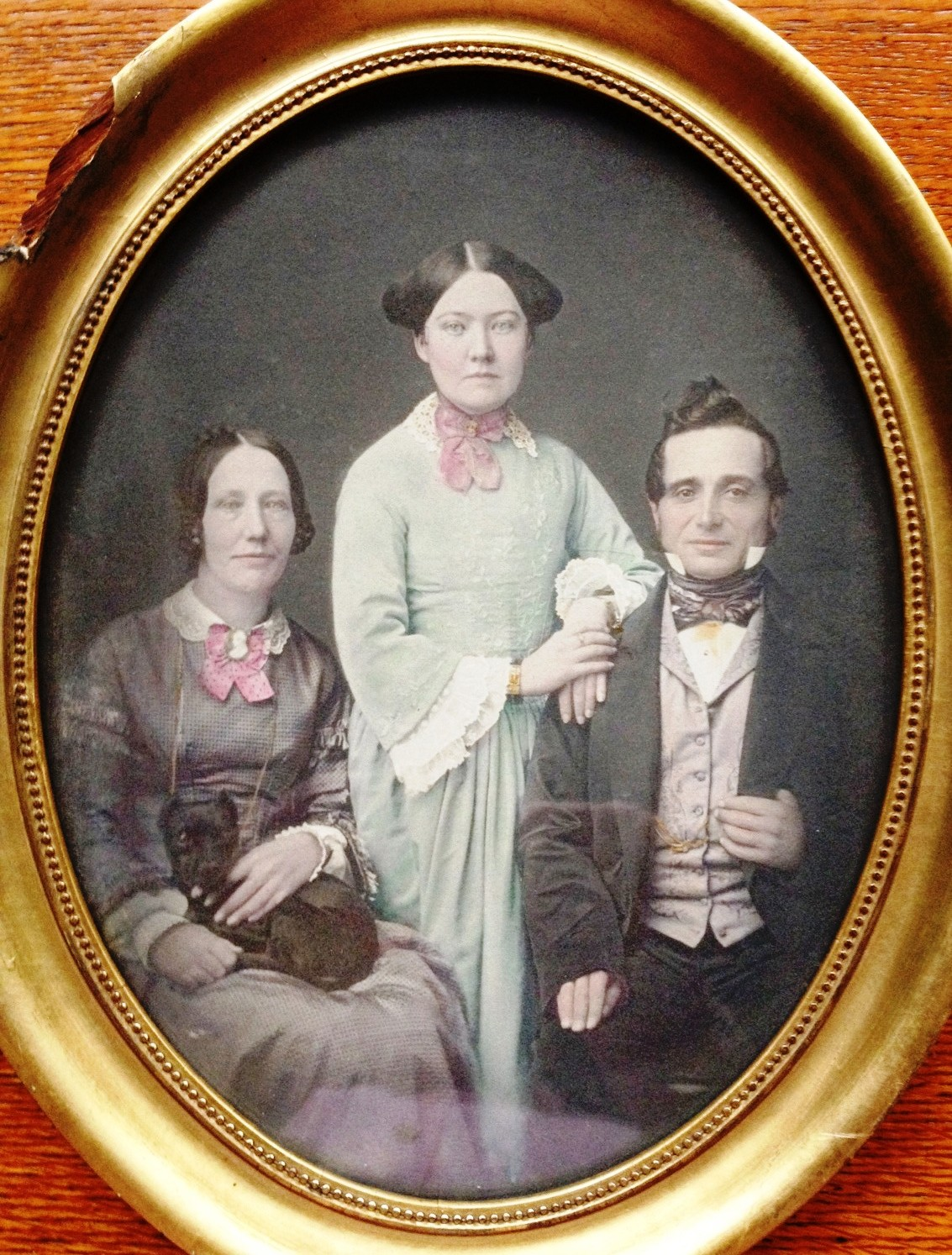
Adèle Bayer, Rosine Parmentier, and Edward Bayer

== Sources ==
- Stiles, History of the City of Brooklyn (Brooklyn, 1870)
- U. S. Cath. Hist. Soc. Records and Studies (New York, 1900), II, pt. I; Ibid (New York, 1904), III, pt. II.
