= Adèle Caby-Livannah =

Congolese writer

- Born: 1957; Congo, Brazzaville
- Education: Higher School Of Commerce And Industry Administration
- Occupation(s): Writer, Storyteller

Adèle Caby-Livannah (born 1957) is a writer from the Republic of the Congo. In 1983, she became a school librarian in Mantes-la-Jolie, France. She is primarily a short fiction writer with at least two collections.

== Biography ==
Adèle Caby-Livannah was born on 1957 in Congo - Brazzaville. She relocated to France in 1982. Continuing her education, she pursued studies at the Higher School of Commerce and Industry Administration (ESACI). After completing her studies, she ventured into the field of school libraries, bringing her skills to this domain a few years later. Working in school libraries and noticing the absence of tales from the Congo on the shelves played a pivotal role in inspiring her debut work, "CONTES ET HISTOIRES DU CONGO"

Presently, she manages her time between crafting written works and orchestrating the initiatives of an association dedicated to promoting African culture and integration in the Paris region. She is additionally recognized as a storyteller. Adèle Caby-Livannah holds membership in the Charter of Children's Literature Authors and is affiliated with the Society of Men of Letters of France.

== Selected works ==
- 2002 : CONTES ET HISTOIRES DU CONGO. ISBN 978-2747525633
- 2003 : Les contes de la Pleine Lune. ISBN 978-2747536967
- 2005 : La case maléfique suivi de Samana et les panthères du Congo.ISBN 978-2747581158
- 2007 : Oufana et le papillon bleu: Conte du Congo - À partir de 6 ans. ISBN 978-2296035867
- 2008 : PLUME D'OISEAU MAGIQUE ET AUTRES CONTES D'AFRIQUE CENTRALE (LA). ISBN 978-2350003399
- 2012 : De l'Alsace à l'Afrique: Le voyage de Chona. ISBN 978-2336001890
