= Adelle Onyango =

Kenyan radio presenter and social activist (born 1989)

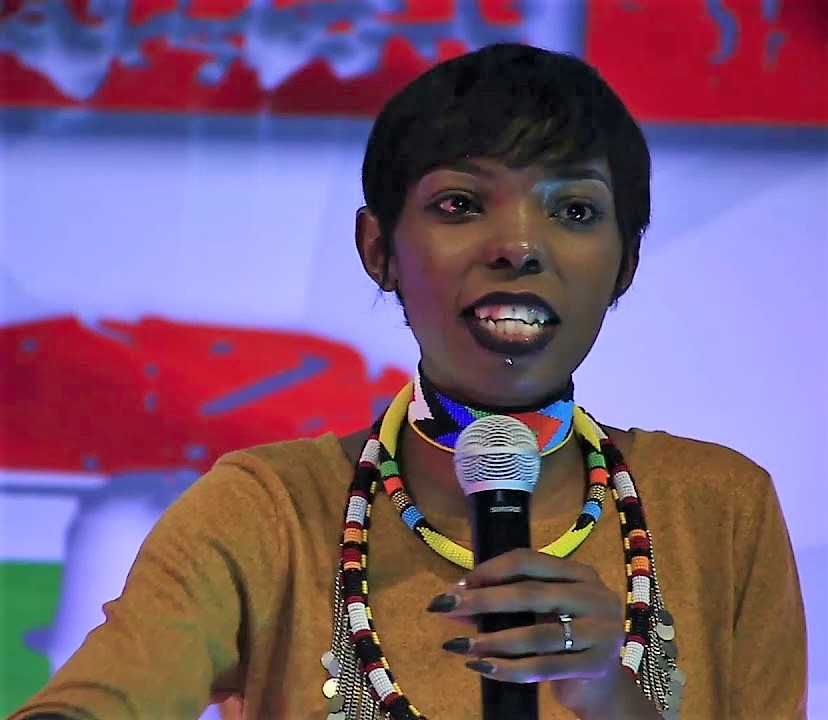
- Adelle Onyango on Hustle Yako in 2017
- Born: 5 February 1989 (age 37); Kenya
- Education: United States International University
- Known for: Social activism Social media
- Awards: BBC 100 Women; Okay Africa 100 Women
- Website: adelleonyango.com

Adelle Onyango (born 5 February 1989) is a Kenyan radio presenter, social activist and media personality. She was selected as one of 2017's BBC 100 Women and one of OkayAfrica's Top Women of 2018.

== Early life and education ==
Onyango is from Kenya, but she attended high school in Botswana. In 2008, she was raped by a stranger in Westlands, Nairobi. Onyango has since supported causes to support the victims of rape, such as founding the campaign No Means No. She studied journalism and psychology at United States International University Africa, where she specialised in public relations. She has always been interested in poetry, but felt there was not enough space for her and her fellow artists. In her final year at university she started an open mic night, where poets and musicians shared their work. While still at university Onyango was headhunted by Then One FM, a Kenyan radio station, and recruited to host their drive time radio programme. She lost her mother to breast cancer in 2012, which has motivated Onyango to becoming involved with campaigns to promote awareness and treatments.

== Career ==
Onyango worked as a presenter for the Kenyan radio station Kiss FM Nairobi, where she presented the Saturday breakfast show for seven years. At Kiss FM she started a Saturday evening programme on which she played African music. During her time at KISS she became a social media influencer, with her followers calling themselves #TeamAdelle. She left Kiss FM in 2019.

Intel announced that Onyango was one of their She Will Connect ambassadors in 2015. In this capacity she has trained women in Africa to be more confident online and use the internet as a tool for empowerment. She has spoken out against online trolls, saying: "...be better or grow up. Deal with your internal issues instead of projecting them on us." In 2016 Onyango established a mentorship programme, the Sisterhood, which offers support for women in Africa. Through No Means No and Sisterhood Onyango helps women access therapies and safe houses, as well as offering confidence classes for victims of rape. She has worked to champion Kenyan women and young people, and launched a new initiative, Unapologetically African, in 2018. As part of this effort she developed a work-experience programme for high-school students.

She started the podcast Legally Clueless in March 2019. The podcast is syndicated by Trace 95.3 FM. The show has both an audio and video format. Meru University of Science and Technology hosted a live episode of Legally Clueless in November 2019. Adelle released her 100th episode of Legally Clueless in February 2021. The podcast was one of the top podcasts on Spotify in August 2021.

She is co-author with Lanji Ouku of the book Our Broken Silence, documenting the voices of survivors of rape, family members, activists, and others, published in March 2022.

=== Awards and honours ===
Onyango was selected as one of the BBC's top 100 Women in 2017. In 2018 she was selected as one of OkayAfrica's top 100 women. She was one of two Kenyans included in the Africa Youth Awards' 100 Most Influential Young Africans in 2019.
