= Adela =

Adela may refer to:

== Arts and entertainment ==
- Adela, a 1933 Romanian novel by Garabet Ibrăileanu
- Adela (1985 film), a 1985 Romanian film directed by Mircea Veroiu
- Adela (2000 film), an Argentine thriller
- Adela (2008 film), a Philippine film

== Other uses ==
- Adela (moth), a genus of fairy longhorn moths
- La Adela, a place in La Pampa Province, Argentina
- USS Adela, an American Civil War steamer
- Adela (brig), a ship launched in 1862
- Adela Investment Company, a former private investment corporation
- Adela (cave), one of the entrances to the Crnopac cave system in Croatia
- Cerro Adela, a mountain in Argentina
- Adela (given name), a female given name, including a list of people with the name

== See also ==
- Adéla, Slovak singer-songwriter
- Adel (disambiguation)
- Adele (disambiguation)
- Adell (disambiguation)
- Adelia (disambiguation)
- Adeia (disambiguation)
