= Adelia (disambiguation) =

Adelia is a genus of flowering plants in the spurge family, Euphorbiaceae, subfamily Acalyphoideae.

Adelia or Adélia may also refer to:

== Given name ==
- Adelia Aguilar, fictional medieval pathologist in books written by Diana Norman under the pen name Ariana Franklin
- Adelia Pope Branham (1861–1917), American writer
- Adelia Di Carlo (1883–1965), Argentine writer, chronicler, founder
- Adelia Sarah Gates (1825–1912), American illustrator of botanical specimens
- Adelia Cleopatra Graves (1821–1895), American poet
- Adelia Field Johnston (1837–1910), American college professor, dean
- Mary Adelia Rosamond McLeod, the first woman Diocesan Bishop in the Episcopal Church
- Adélia Prado (born 1935), Brazilian writer and poet
- Mary Lua Adelia Davis Treat (1830–1923), naturalist and correspondent with Charles Darwin

== Other ==
- Adelia (opera), an 1841 opera in three acts by Gaetano Donizetti
- Adelia (cicada), a genus of cicadas

== Places ==
- Santa Adélia, municipality in the state of São Paulo, Brazil
- Adelia Land, claimed territory in the continent of Antarctica

== See also ==
- Adela (disambiguation)
- Adeli (disambiguation)
- Adelieae, a tribe of the subfamily Acalyphoideae
- Adelina (disambiguation)
- Adelita (disambiguation)
- Delia (disambiguation)
