= Uvala (landform) =

Toponym for a closed karst depression

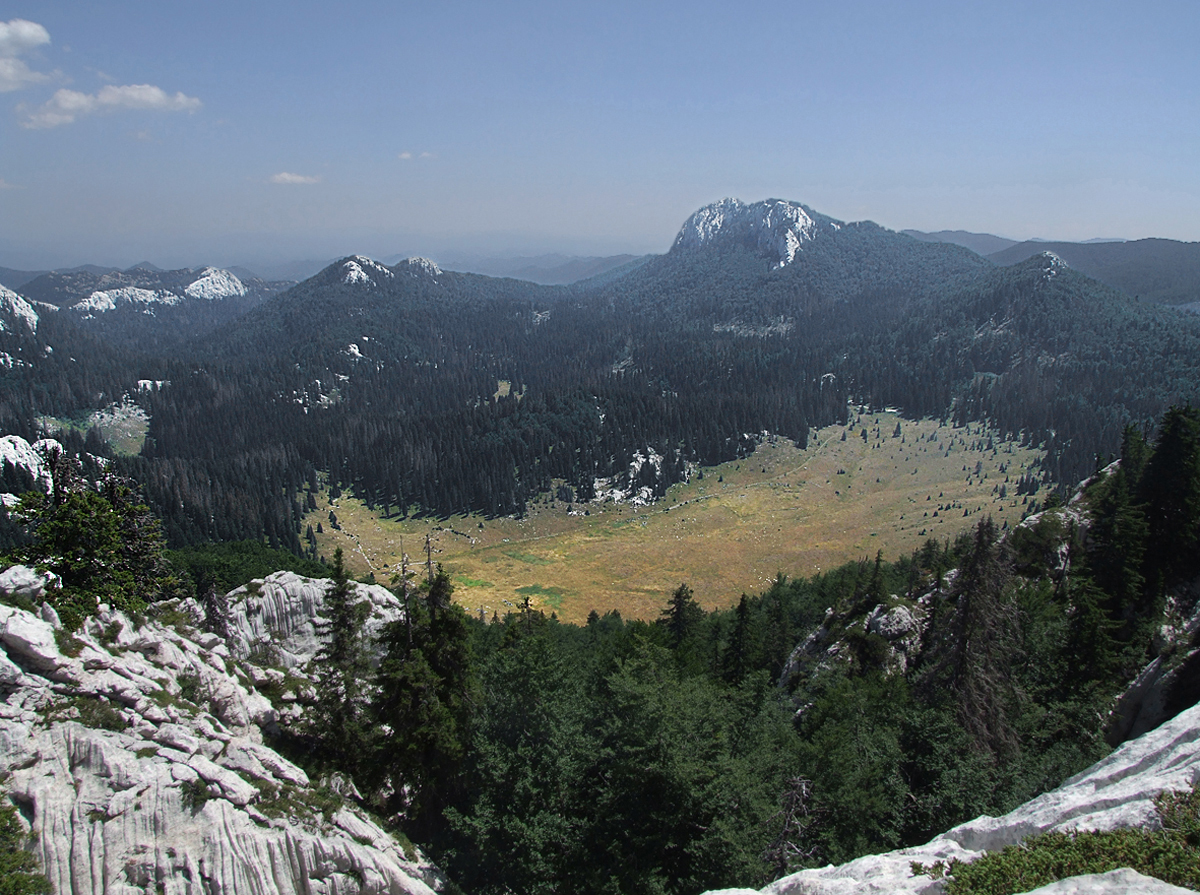
Veliki Lubenovac, in the north of the Velebit mountain range, is a uvala of about 1 km in size

Uvala is originally a local toponym used by people in some regions in Slovenia, Croatia, Bosnia and Herzegovina, Montenegro and Serbia. In geosciences it denotes a closed karst depression, a terrain form usually of elongated or compound structure and of larger size than that of sinkholes. It is a morphological form frequently found in the outer Dinaric Alps anywhere between Slovenia and Greece, but large closed karst depressions are found on all continents in different landscapes and therefore uvala has become a globally established term. It is also used to distinguish such depressions from poljes, which are many square kilometres in size. Definitions of uvalas are often poorly empirically supported. "The coalescence of dolines" (sinkholes) is the dominant and most frequently found definition. However, because of the ongoing dissatisfaction with this definition, the term 'uvala' has often been belittled – occasionally it was even proposed that the term be given up altogether.

However, recent empirical research (~2009) revised poor mainstream definitions, stating that "…uvalas are large (in km scale) karst closed depressions of irregular or elongated plan form resulting from accelerated corrosion along major tectonically broken zones." This is arguing for the "re-introducing of uvalas into modern karstology" – distinguishing them from dolines and poljes in size (typically) and "also in morphology and combination of genetic factors", which give them "a status of a particular karst relief form."

== Uvalas in early karstology ==
Thanks to the research work of the Serbian geographer Jovan Cvijić (1865–1927), the protégé of Albrecht Penck (the Nestor of the Vienna School of Physical Geography), the word uvala – like the words 'karst', 'dolina' or 'polje', popular terms of the Dinarides – became an established international standard. As the father of karst morphology and hydrogeology, Cvijić envisioned the phenomena of karstology in his publications, first in regions of Europe and then all over the world.

Early karstologists like Cvijić (1921) believed the long-term processes of evolution of each karst depression could be explained in cyclic theories:

Dolines evolve into uvalas, and uvalas into poljes.

However, the increasing body of literature and data collected on karst on all continents, and the global insight that climate ought to be considered as an essential genetic factor in all karst analysis, raised growing concern that this definition may be unsatisfactory.

== The mainstream definitions of uvala ==
These days most authors consider theories of cyclic karst evolution as outdated or even as untenable. Some authors, while dismissing cyclic theory, at the same time discard the term uvala altogether: "…This mechanism is no longer accepted and the term uvala has fallen into disuse", Lowe&Waltham (1995). In the comprehensive primer 'Karst Hydrogeology and Geomorphology', written by Ford&Williams (2007) for the English oriented world, likewise in their contributions in English encyclopedias, the uvala is simply not a factor in their karst models (uvalas, they claim, are simply very large dolines).

With his influence and publications the internationally renown German morphologist, Herbert Lehmann, put an end to the focus of karstology on warm temperate climate. Lehmann in 1973: "Der mediterrane Karst, im engeren Sinne der Dinarische Karst, ist nicht das Musterbeispiel der Karstentwicklung überhaupt, sondern eher Ausnahme", Lehmann (1973/1987) (Dinaric karst is an exception).

Nevertheless, the mainstream position of karstology and especially non-European karstology still dominates with the somewhat singular, empirically unsupported, definition:

As solution depressions evolve, some enlarge laterally and coalesce, producing compound closed depressions known as uvalas.

— Williams, P.: 'Karst' in: Goudie (2005)

Large closed depression formed by the coalescence of several dolines which have enlarged towards each other.

— Sweeting, M. M. (1973)

For most English textbooks and encyclopedias and additionally some German equivalents the term uvala is straightforward. When only briefly defined, one of the above cited definitions, in most cases Sweeting's (1973), is used. Yet, the definition 'dolines coalescing into uvalas' is logically the first part of the cyclic theory, claimed to having been little used or abolished!

Most scientific monographs however, such as comprehensive empirical studies, confirm the existence of the authentic type of uvala – yet most monographs analyze European objects only, and most are written and published in languages other than English.

== Technical sciences progress in support of uvala as a particular relief form? ==
=== New contributions of technical sciences ===
The recent progress in methods and measuring techniques in the sciences (measuring radionuclides, nuclear chemistry, climatology, seismology, Information systems) with the regard to geological objects allows dating in dimensions of several hundred thousand or even million years – with high precision. (The samples needed in physics- or chemical labs can be very small, but they must be extremely well purified. All measurements are usually very resource-consuming (expensive). Bosák (2003) lists no fewer than 64 dating methods. But he also describes their limited feasibility for certain geological objects and their variant span of time, which can be measured.)

Some progress in dating was made by ensuring that examined sediment probes and fossils have not only been exposed to surface, where denudation, weathering or corrosion are in effect. Rather "allochthonous" objects, which were moved and washed into cavities, transported into fissures or caves, might be archive elements of early karst activity and tectonic stages of nearby large closed depressions.

=== Dating with modern techniques in the Swabian Alb ===
Results for a reliable age were achieved, e.g., by combining uranium-thorium dating, paleo geological and paleontological dating in sediment beddings (probes and fossils) inside the cave de:Karls- und Bärenhöhle on the Swabian Alb, Germany. The isotope-method yielded an age of ca. 450 thousand years (ka). Taking into account fossil analysis, a denudation rate, the local and regional lithology and the position of the primeval river cave (now dry) high above the recent valley bottom, the age of the cave was determined to be roughly five million years (Ma), Ufrecht/Abel (2003).

In 2006 fossil remains in sediments of unroofed caves of the Middle Swabian Alb were successfully dated, Ufrecht (2006). The remains of large land-mammals of seven genera were lithologically and bio-stratigraphically (paleontologically) classified into the biozones MN1 to MN17 of the European Land Mammal Mega Zones (ELMMZ) table. These found genera overlapped only in MN9, which is ca. eleven Ma.

=== Dating with modern techniques on the Dinarides ===
Recent analysis of sediments in caves and unroofed caves of Slovenia produced in some cases ages of c. 450ka. In the Postojna Caves (Slovenia) the method of paleomagnetism in combination with paleontological studies yielded a dating comparable to that on the Swabian Alb. Thus those caves themselves were estimated to have an age of c. 3.4 Ma.

Carbonate rocks of the Dinarides are 4500 to 8000 m thick and thus reach deep below the current sea level. There are thousands of caves in the Dinarides. Bakšić (2008) published the systematic exploration of eight shafts on Mt. Velebit, the deepest, Lukina Jama, explored down to 1431 m, only 83 m above sea level.

== Extremely retrospective views: The genetic and evolutionary issue ==
If an age of karst depressions larger than dolines beyond 2,6 Ma is possible, that is: depression development may possibly have started in Pliocene or even in Miocene, then depressions were already formed in Europe's (sub-)tropical climates.

However, even if a very high age of a depression is assumed, which karst form will emerge? "Very similar genetic factors can lead to the development of different forms, depending on the conditions within a karst area", Ćalić (2009) p. 166f.

== Uvala revisited: Tectonics. Accelerated corrosion along major tectonically 'broken zones' of regional faults ==
The geographer Jelena Ćalić, chose to analyze large karst depressions using geomorphological (morphometrical) and structural geologic mapping methods. This way Ćalić gained more data of tectonically induced subsurface traces. Forty-three large karst depressions (potential uvalas), sampled by shape, size and elevation in the Dinarides of Slovenia, Croatia, 'Bosnia and Herzegovina', Montenegro, and Serbia were analyzed by digital elevation models (DEM) and field research. The results were published in English in the journal 'Geomorphology, Amsterdam, 2011', Ćalić (2011). In twelve of the forty-three studied depressions detailed structural-geological mapping (following the method of J. Ćar (2001)) was carried out. This mapping "revealed dominant development of uvalas along tectonically 'broken zones' of regional scale", the 'broken zones' being highly permeable.

The Croatian mountain chain Velebit is probably the richest area in karstic uvalas of the Dinarides, Poljak (1951) cited by Ćalić (2009) p. 70. The breccia in this chain – there known as Jelar breccia – show very extensive outcropping. These highly permeable carbonate breccias are a prominent feature of "Middle Eocene to Middle Miocene" age faulting activities in the Velebit area, Vlahovic et al. (2012). The deep incision of Velebit's most prominent uvala Lomska Duliba can be explained by the presence of the Jelar breccias, Ćalić (2009), p. 72.

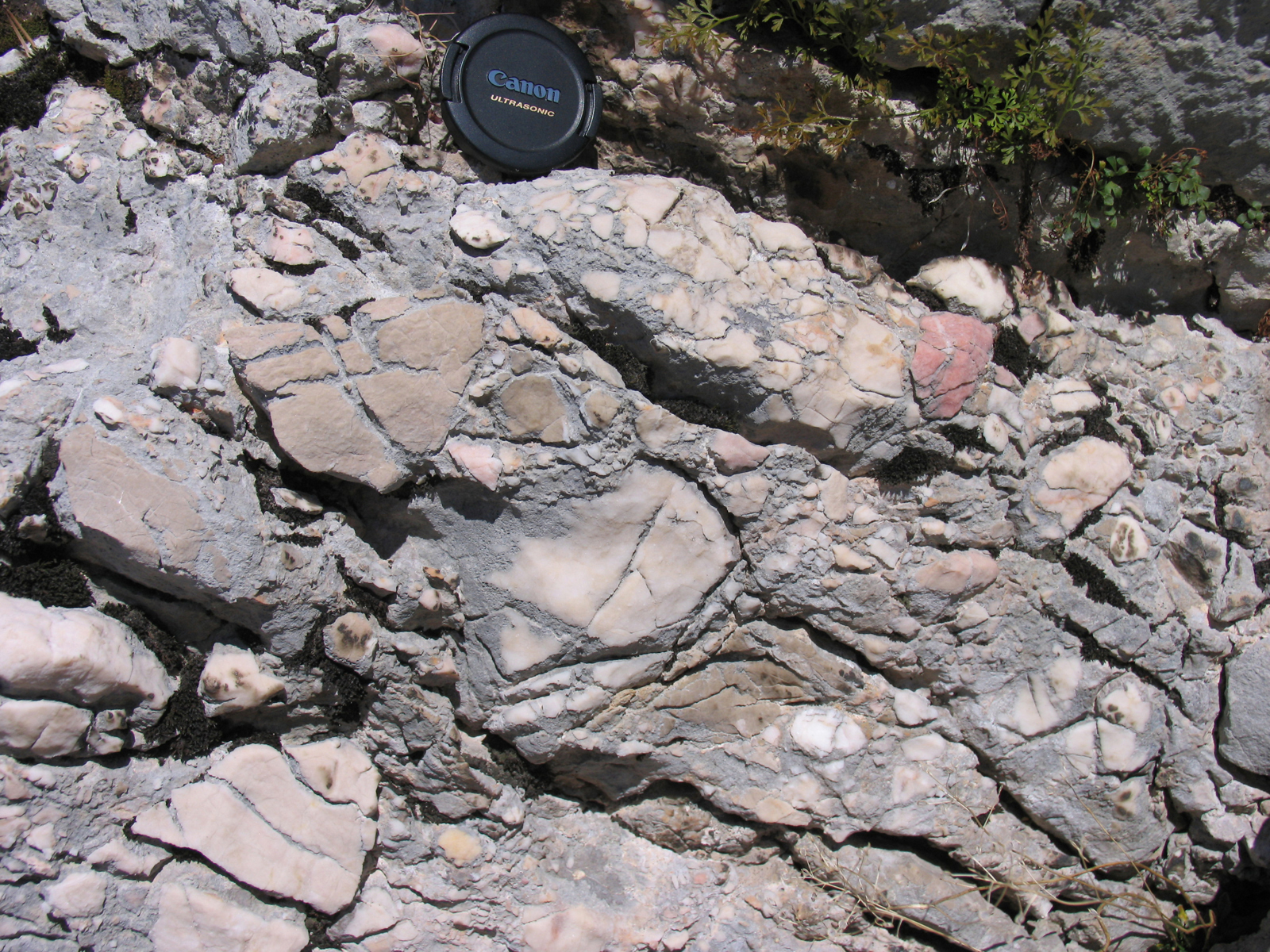
'Jelar breccia', Velebit, extensively outcropping

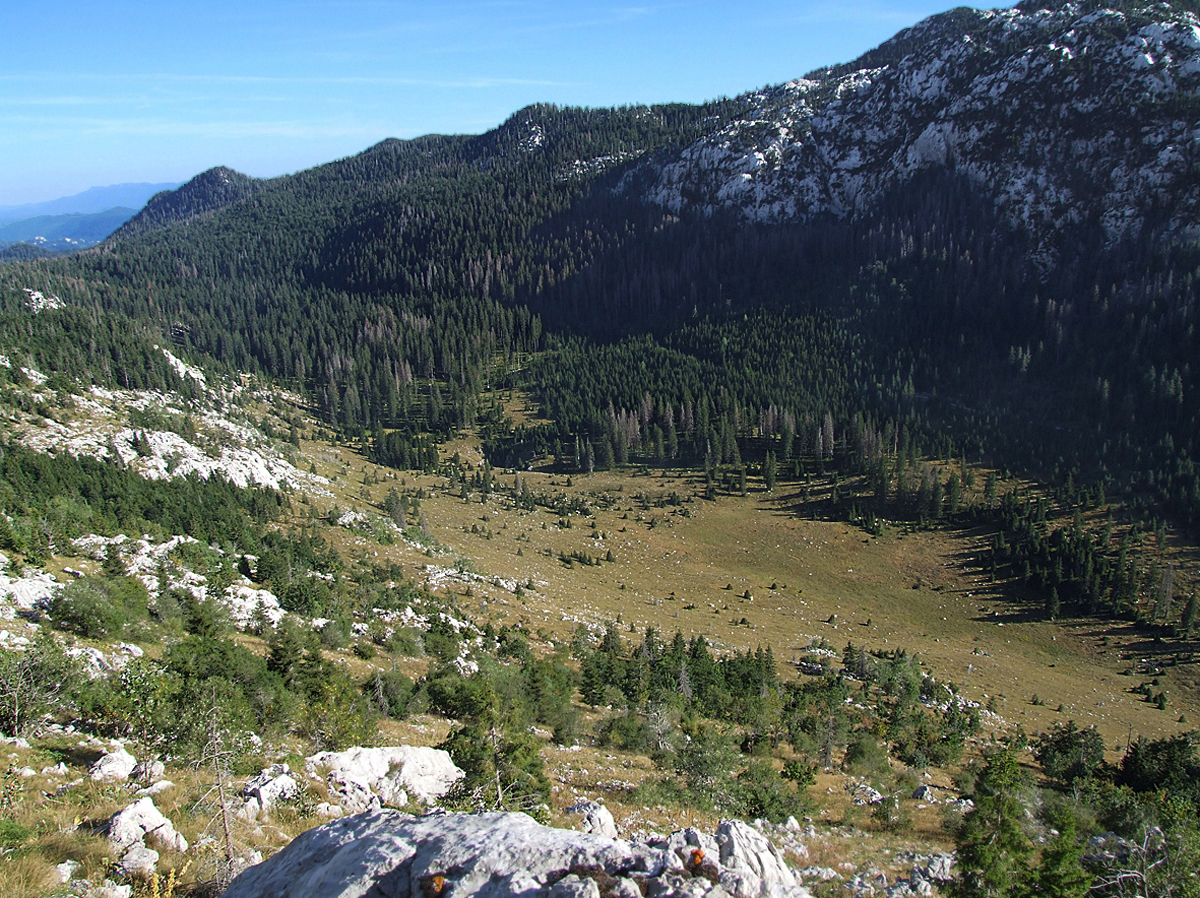
Lomska Duliba, N Velebit, length ca. 7km, altitude: 1,25km

=== New definition of uvala ===
Ćalić (2011) defines uvala as follows:
"The term uvala must be excluded from such contexts," (cyclic concepts) "because they discredit its true meaning." [...] "At this stage of research, it can be concluded that uvalas are large (in km scale) karst closed depressions of irregular or elongated plan form resulting from accelerated corrosion along major tectonically broken zones. Their bottoms are undulating or pitted with dolines, seldom flattened by colluvial sediments and always situated above the karst water table." [(...] "…small seasonal sinking streams or, ponds are very rare, an exception rather than a rule." [...] "The depressions of this kind are not present on karst levelled surfaces, but only in areas with more or less dissected relief;" [...] they "are forms of accelerated corrosion – not as points as dolines, but 'linear' or 'areal' [...]."Ćalić (2009) and Ćalić (2011).

Ćalić in a nut shell: There are deficits in most previous uvala-definitions. The revision was overdue. It re-introduces uvalas into modern karstology!

The second edition of the 'Encyclopedia of Caves', Culver&White (2012), amongst others, added the keyword 'Dinaric Karst, Geography and Geology', Zupan Hanja (2012), while U. Sauro revised his keyword 'Closed Depressions' – in part, so that both authors now fully endorse Ćalić's revival of the term karstic uvala.

== Global relevance of uvalas ==
Ćalić's work and resulting definition affirms that Dinaric uvalas are karst forms in their own right. The question remains whether this is relevant globally and in different climates. Possibly the postulate of Lehmann (1973/1987) that Dinaric Karst is not representative for karst worldwide (see above), with respect to uvalas must be re-examined.

In the comprehensive karst modelling of Ford&Williams (2007) uvalas are irrelevant. Yet, they consider the term uvala indispensable and use it no less than six times to describe karst phenomena found in different epochs, climates and regions of various continents, in some cases with reference to other authors.

A German publication lists fifty-seven 'Karstwannen' on the Swabian Alb, Bayer&Groschopf (1989). Together with a few more on the karstic Franconian Jura, there may well be about 70 large depressions, half of which are 1000-4500m in length. According to Bayer&Groschopf, p. 182 "[...] sind Karstwannen eher mit Uvalas denn mit Poljes zu korrelieren, [...] entsprechen von der geomorphologischen Ausformung dem Uvala Charakter." (They correlate with uvalas rather than with poljes, [...] they correspond to geomorphological forms of uvalas).

Pfeiffer (2010) discusses Karstwannen ("Karst depression","Uvala"," Polje") of the Swabian Alb, the Franconian Jura and those of the Causses (southern France). "Die Karstwannen sind eigenständige Formen, die eine zeitweise großflächige Tieferlegung der Gesteinsoberfläche belegen", S. 210 (Karstwannen are a distinctive form element, confirming, there was a phase of extensive lowering of the rocky plane). Yet considering the terms uvala or polje, he is undecided, mainly because

- of his own findings of shapes,
- "Die Wannen weisen zum Teil sehr mächtige Füllungen auf, die regional sehr unterschiedlich sind und eine Spanne von tertiären Sedimenten über quartäre periglaziale Schichten bis hin zu Kolluvium umfassen", S. 212 (Some of the Wannen have tremendous fillings. The size of the fillings differs from region to region. There are sediments of various ages, ranging from tertiary to quaternary periglacial sediments or even colluvium).
- the lack of correspondence with the mainstream-definition,
- the very sparse literature on a West- or Central European feature of the kind.

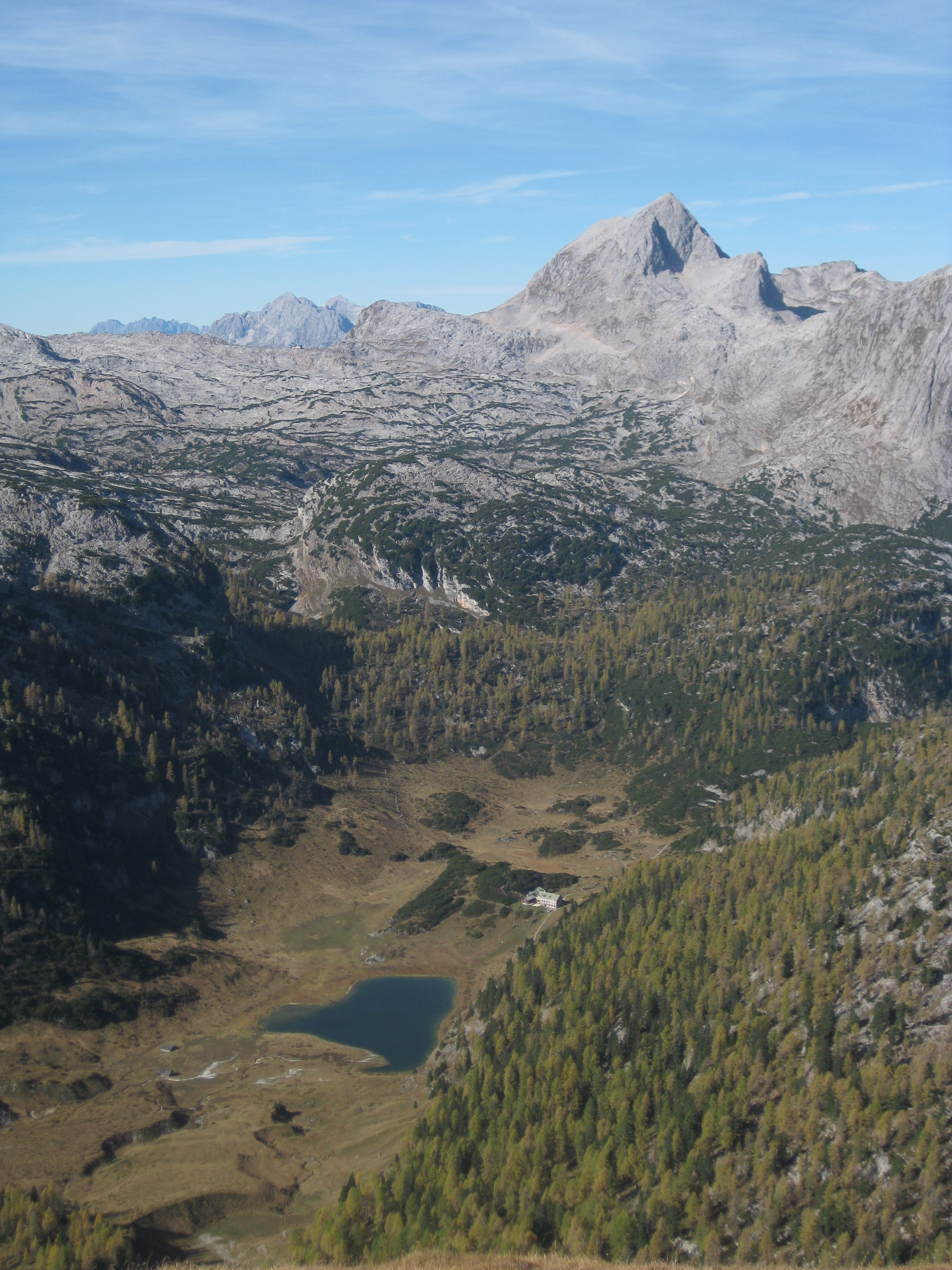
Alpine Funtensee-Uvala of 2000x750 m, uvala and pond with subsurface drainage, Berchtesgaden Alps (Northern Limestone Alps)

Large areas of the Alps, those flanking the central massive on the north and the south (Northern Limestone Alps, Southern Limestone Alps), geologically consist of limestone stratigraphy of various ages. A lot of geological research in speleology, tectonics and petrology has been done, but this rarely focuses on large closed karst depressions like uvalas. The 'Funtensee-Uvala' (Steinernes Meer of the Berchtesgaden Alps) is an exception, which was analyzed and published in the context of a project of the Berchtesgaden National Park.

== World occurrences of uvalas (some examples) ==
=== Europe (examples) ===
- Germany (Swabian Alb, Franconian Jura), Pfeiffer (2010)
- England, Sweeting (1972)
- Ireland, Gunn (2004)

Limestone Alps

- Funtensee, Berchtesgaden, Fischer (1985)
- Venetian Prealps, Sauro (2003)

Spain

- Calaforra Chordi&Berrocal Pérez (2008)
- Palomares Martin (2012)
- Portugal, Nicod (2003)
- France, Les 'Causses', Nicod (2003)
- Romania, (Ford&Williams (2007)
- Greece, Jalov&Stamenova (2005)
- Serbia, Rečke, Busovata, Nekudovo, Igrište, Brezovica (Carpathians, east Serbia)

Dinarides:

- Numerous uvalas in four countries, inter alia, Ćalić (2009):
- Kanji Dol, Mrzli Log, Grda Draga, etc. (Slovenia)
- Lomska Duliba, Veliki Lubenovac, Mirovo, Bilenski Padez, Duboki Dol, Ravni and Crni Dabar, etc. (Croatia)
- Rupa, Ždralovac, Klekovačka Uvala, etc. (Bosnia and Herzegovina)
- Ljeskovi Dolovi, Ubaljski Do, Illinski Do, etc. (Montenegro)

=== Other continents (examples) ===
America

- Appalachian Mountains, (Herak (1972)
- New-Mexiko, (Ford&Williams (2007)
- Oklahoma, Ford&Williams (2007)

Africa

- various, Gunn (2004)
- Marocco, Jennings (1987)

Asia

- Iran, Bosák, et al. (1999)
- China, Gunn (2004)
- South east Asia (Burma, Thailand, Cambodia, Malaysia), Gunn (2004)

Australia

- (Tasmania), Jennings (1987)
- New Zealand, Jennings (1987)
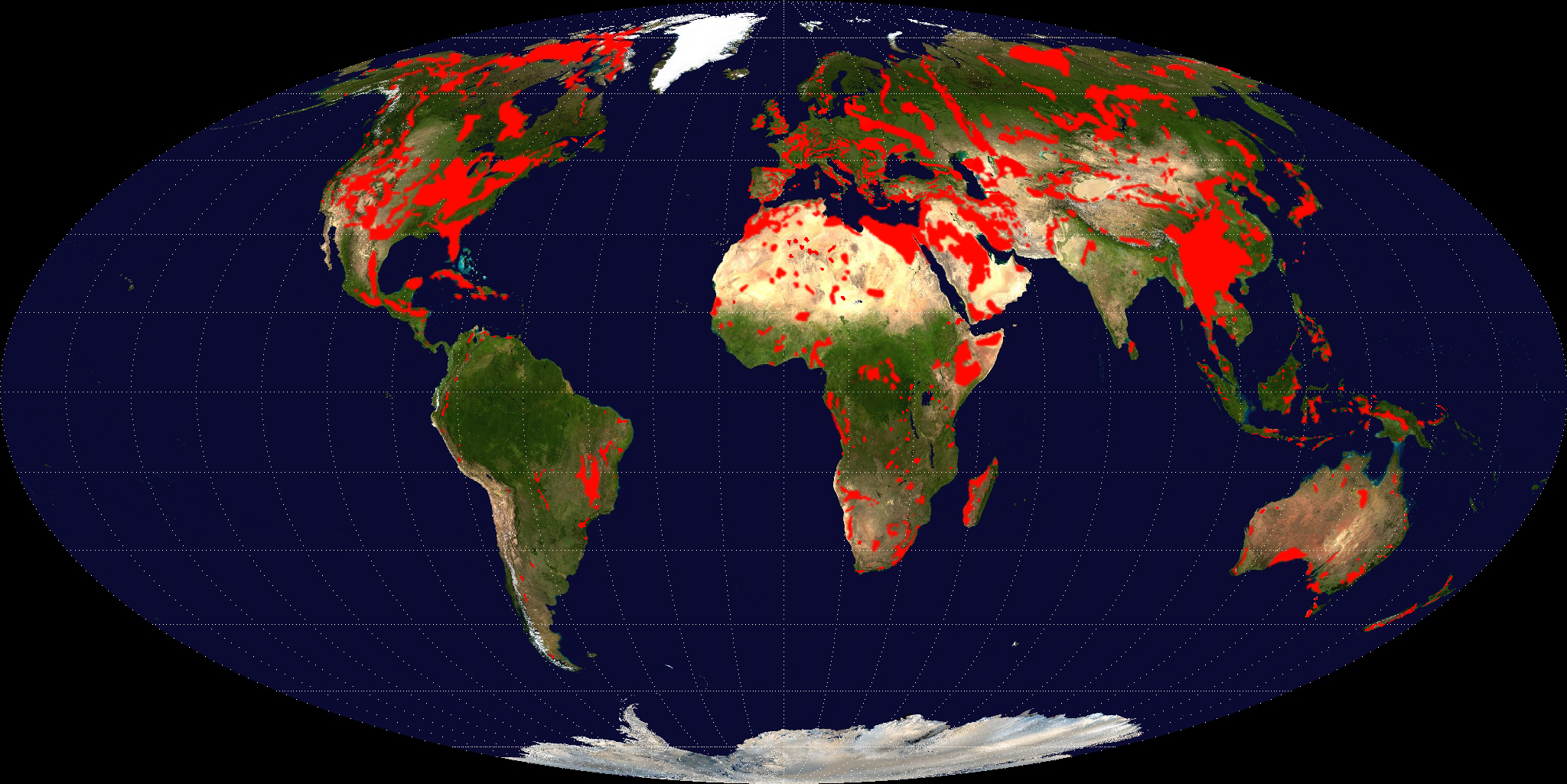
Outcropping limestone (without evaporites), Ca. 20% of icefree land

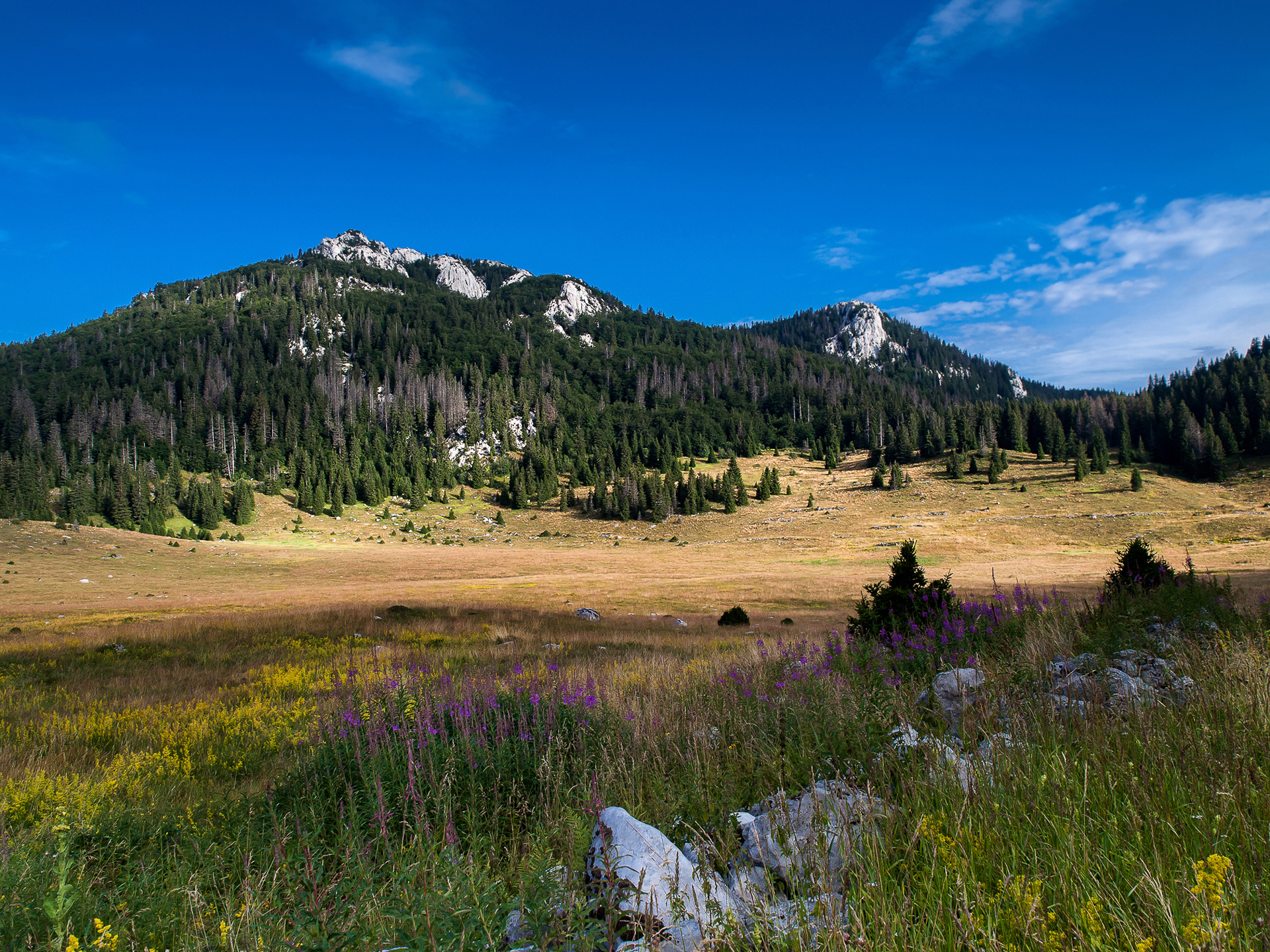
Veliki Lubenovac, North Velebit

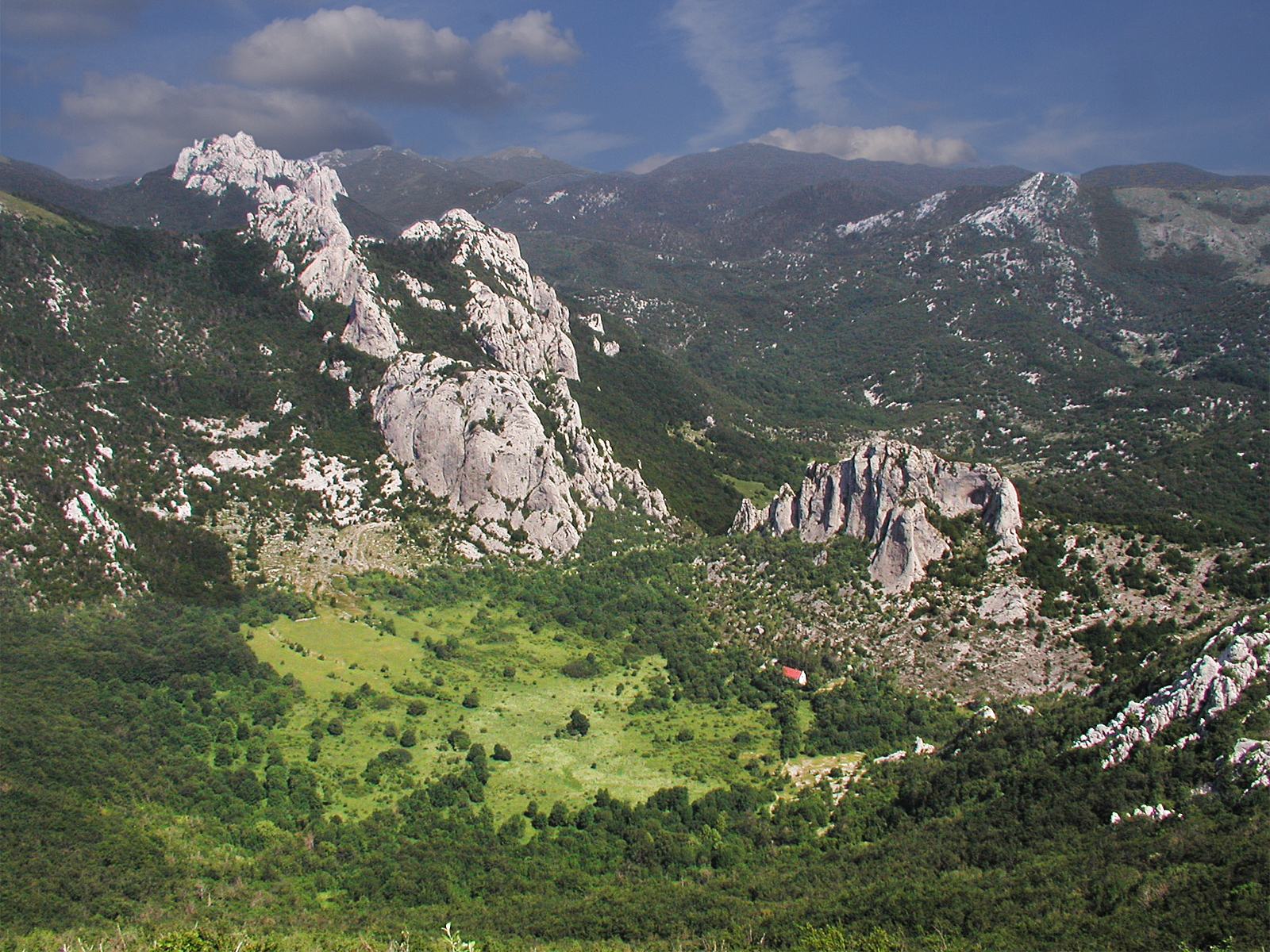
Ravni Dabar, Middle Velebit

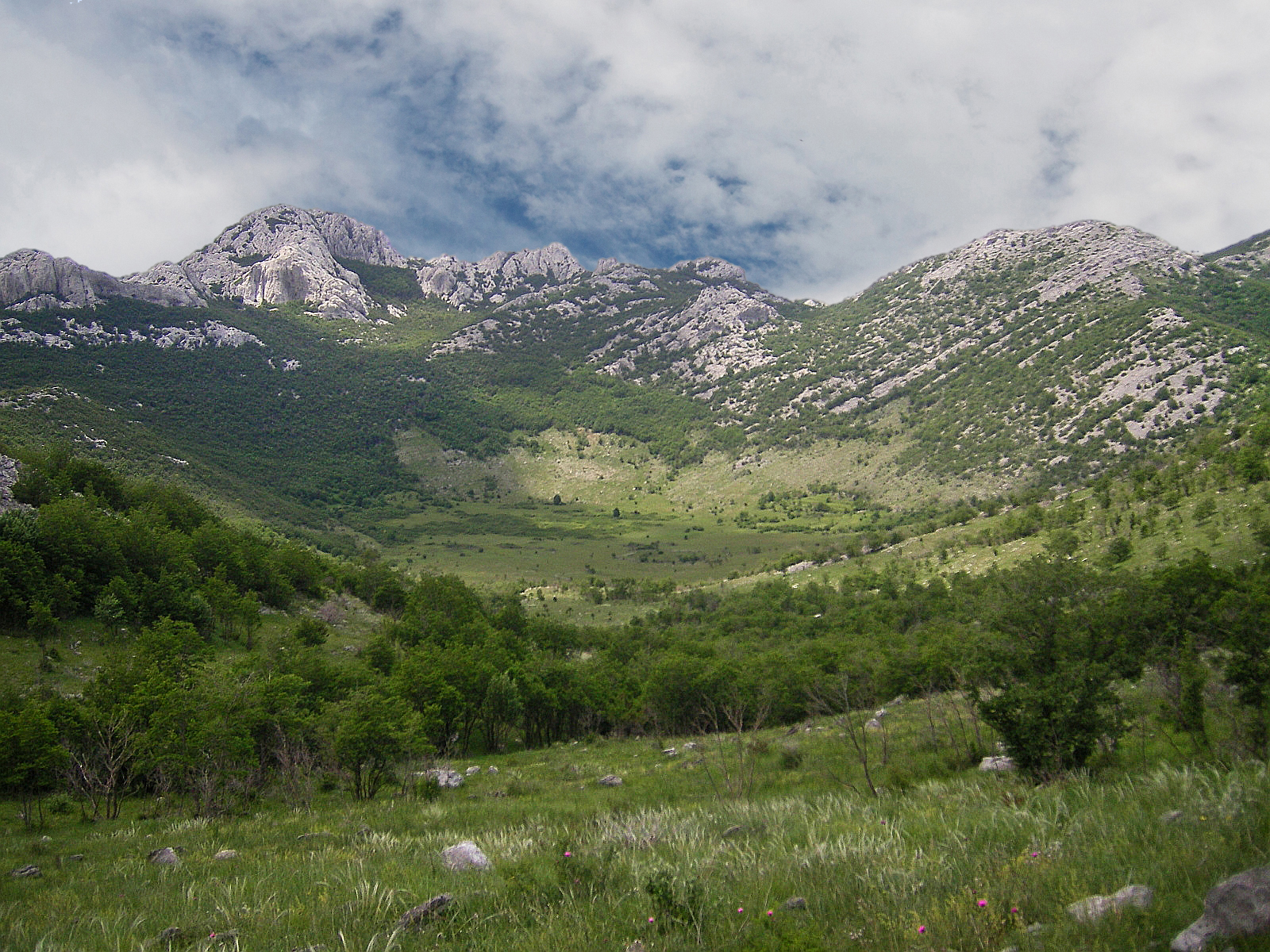
Duboki Dol, South Velebit

== See also ==
- List of karst areas
- Karst Plateau (Italy-Slovenia) – Plateau region across southwestern Slovenia and northeastern Italy
- Slovak Karst – Carpathian geology
- South China Karst
- Wulong Karst – Karst landscape in China
- List of caves in Croatia
- Velebit caves – Caves in Croatia

== Literature ==
Cvijić 1893, Das Karstphänomen. Versuch eine morphologischen Monographie. Cvijić, Jovan. in: Geographische Abhandlungen A. Penck, (Hrsg), Bd. V, Heft 3, Wien

Davies, (1899), The Geographical Cycle, Davis, William M., The Geographical Journal, Vol. 14, No. 5 (Nov., 1899), pp. 481–504

Cvijić (1901), Morphologische und glaziale Studien aus Bosnien, Herzegowina und Montenegro. II Teil, Die Karstpoljen, Cvijić, Jovan. in: Abhandlungen der K. K. Geograph. Gesellsch., Bd. III, Heft 2, Wien 1901

Grund (1903), Die Karsthydrographie: Studien aus Westbosnien. Grund, A., Geographischen Abhandlungen, Band VII, Heft 3, von A. Penck, 7, pp. 103–200.

Grund (1914), Der geographische Zyklus im Karst. Grund, A., Gesellschaft für Erdkunde, 52, 621–40. [Translated into English in Sweeting (1981).]

Cvijić (1921), Souterraine et Evolution Morphologique du Karst, Cvijić, J., Review by Sanders, E.M. in: Geographical Review, Vol. 11, No. 4 (Oct., 1921), pp. 593–604

Cvijić, (1925) Types morphologiques des terrains calcaires. Cvijić, J., Comptes Rendus, Académie des Sciences (Paris), 180, 592, 757, 1038.

Poljak (1951), Is a karst uvala a transitional form between a doline and a karst polje?, Polak, J., Croatian Geographical Bulletin, 13, Zagreb, 1951

Cvijić (1960), La geographie des terrains calcaires. Academie serbe des sciences et des arts, Cvijić, J., Monographie tome CCCXLI, Classe de sciences mathématique et naturelles, 26, 1–212

Fairbridge (1968), The encyclopedia of Geomorphology, Fairbridge, R.W., New York, N.Y., 1968

Herak (1972), Karst, important Karst regions of the northern Hemisphere, Herak, M., Stringfield, V. T., Amsterdam 1972

UNESCO (1972), Glossary and Multilingual Equivalents of Karst Terms. UNESCO, Paris 1972.

Sweeting (1973), Karst Landforms, selected glossary, compiled by K. Addison, Sweeting, M. M., London 1973.

Lehmann (1973/1987), Karstphänomene im Nordmediterranen Raum, (1973), Lehmann, Herbert, in: Fuchs, F., (ed), Beiträge zur Karstmorphologie, Herbert Lehmann; Reprint noch aktueller Beiträge, Stuttgart 1987

Roglic (1974), Contribution to the Croatian karst terminology, Roglic, J., Krs Jugoslavije 9/1, Izdavacki zovod JAZU, Zagreb, 1974.

Gams (1978), The polje: the problem of definition. Gams, I., Zeitschrift für Geomorphologie N.F. 22, Stuttgart 1978

Sweeting, (1981), Karst Geomorphology, Sweeting, M.M. (ed.) Benchmark Papers in Geology 59, Hutchinson-Ross. Stroudsburg, PA.

Chorley (1984), Geomorphology, Chorley, R. J., London, 1984

Trudgill (1985), Trudgill, S., Limestone geomorphology, London, 1985

Fischer (1985), Das Funtensee-Uvala im Steinernen Meer, Fischer, K., Forschungsbericht 7, Nationalpark Berchtesgaden, 1985

Habic (1986), Surface discussion of Dinaric Karst. Habic, P., Acta Carsologica 14/15, 1986

Šušteršič (1986), The closed karst depression, problems of identification and cartography. Šušteršič, F., Acta Carsologica 14–15, Ljubljana 1986

Fuchs et al. (1987), Beiträge zur Karstmorphologie, Herbert Lehmann, Reprint noch aktueller Beiträge, Fuchs, F., Gerstenhauer, A., Pfeffer, K.-H., (ed), Stuttgart 1987

Jennings (1987) Karst Geomorphology, Jennings, J. N., Oxford 1987

White (1988), Geomorphology and hydrology of Karst terrains, White, W.B., Oxford, 1988

Bayer & Groschopf (1989), Karstwannen der Schwäbischen Alb, Bayer, H.-J.& Groschopf, P., Blätter des Schwäbischen Albvereins, 6 1989, Stuttgart

Cocean & Petrescu (1989), Types morphogénétic d'ouvala dans le karst de Mont s Apuseni. Cocean, M., Petrescu, M., Travaux de l'institut de spéléeologie "Emile Racovitza" XVIII

Ford & Williams (1989), Karst Geomorphology and Hydrology, Ford, D.C., Williams, P.W., London 1989.

Lowe & Waltham, (1995), A Dictionary of Karst and Caves: A Brief Guide to the Terminology and Concepts of Cave and Karst Science. Lowe D. & Waltham, T., Cave Studies Series Number 6. British Cave Research Association. London, Britain. 41 pp.

Bosák (1999), Karst and caves in salt diapers, Bosák, P., Bruthans, J., Filippi, M., Svoboda, T., Smid, J., Se Zagros Mts. (Iran)

Kuhta & Baksic (2001), Karstification dynamics and development of the deep caves on the North Velebit Mt. – Croatia. Kuhta, M., Baksic, D., 13. International Congress of speleology, Brasil 2001

Sauro (2001), Aspects of contact karst in the Venetian fore-alps. Sauro, U., Acta Carsologica 30/2, Ljubljana 2001

Čar (2001), Structural basis for shaping dolines. Čar, J., Acta Carsologica 30/2, Ljubljana 2001

EPA (2002), A Lexicon of Cave and Karst Terminology with special Reverence to Environmental Karst Hydrology, Environmental Protection Agency, Washington D.C.. Washington D.C., 2002

Tislar etal (2002), Carbonate platform megafacies of the Jurassic and cretaceous deposits of the Karst Dinarides. Tislar, J., Vlahović, I., Sokač, B., Geologia Croatica 55/2, Zagreb 2002

Bosák (2003), Karst processes from the beginning to the end: How can they be dated?, Bosák, P., 2003

Frelih (2003), Geomorphology of karst depressions: polje or uvala – a case study of Lučki dol. Frelih, M., Acta Carsologica 32/2, Ljubljana 2003

Sauro (2003), Dolines and sinkholes: Aspects of evolution and problems of classification. Sauro, U., Acta Carsologica 32/2, Ljubljana 2003

Nicod (2003), A little contribution to the karst terminology: Special or aberrant cases of poljes?, Nicod, Jean, Acta Carsologica, 32,2 Ljubljana 2003

Abel (2003), Untersuchungen zur Genese des Malmkarsts der Mittleren Schwäbischen Alb im Quartär und jüngeren Tertiär, Abel, Thekla, Tübingen 2003

Ufrecht/Abel (2003): Zur plio-pleistozänen Entwicklung der Bären- und Karlshöhle bei Erpfingen (Schwäbische Alb) unter Berücksichtigung der Sinterchronologie, Ufrecht, W., Abel, Th. & Harlacher, Chr., Laichinger Höhlenfreund, Laichingen 2003

Goudie (2004), Encyclopedia of Geomorphology, Goudie, A.S., New York, N.Y., 2004

Gunn (2004), Encyclopedia of caves and karst Science, Gunn, J., New York, N.Y., 2005

Culver & White (2005), Encyclopedia of Caves, Culver, D. C., White, W. B., Burlington, MA 2005

Sauro (2005), Closed depressions, Sauro, U., in: Culver & White (2005)

Gams (2005), Tectonic impact on poljes and minor basins (case studies of Dinaric karst). Gams, I., Acta Carsologica 34/1, Ljubljana 2005

Jalov &Stamenova (2005), Historical data for karst phenomena in the province of Macedonia, Greece, Jalov, A., Stamenova, M., Greek Cavers Meeting, Karditza 2005

Ufrecht (2006): Ein plombiertes Höhlenruinenstadium auf der Kuppenalb zwischen Fehla und Lauchert (Zollernalbkries, Schwäbische Alb), Ufrecht, W., Laichinger Höhlenfreund, Laichingen 2006

Abel (2006): Zur Verkarstungsgeschichte der Bären und Karlshöhle bei Erpfingen, (Schwäbische Alb), im Plio-Pleistozän unter Berücksichtigung von Sinterchronologie und Paläontologie, Abel, Th.; Harlacher, Chr. & Ufrecht, W., in: Jber. Mitt. oberrhein. geol. Ver., N.F. 88, S. 9–51, Stuttgart 2006

Ford & Williams (2007), Karst Hydrogeology and Geomorphology, Ford, D.C., Williams, P.W., Chichester 2007.

Zupan Hajna et al. (2008), Zupan Hajna, N., Pruner, P., Mihevc, A., Schnabel, P & Bosák, P; Cave sediments from the Postojnska-Planinska caves system (Slovenia): Evidence of multi-phase evolution in epiphreatic zone, Acta Carsologica, 37/1, Ljubljan 2008

Calaforra Chordi & Berrocal Pérez (2008), El Karst de Andalucía, Calaforra Chordi, J.M., Berrocal Pérez, J.A., Sevilla 2008

Bakšić (2008), Cross section through Mt. Velebit, with profiles of deep caves. In: Croatian Speleological Server, Zagreb 2008

Leser (2009), Geomorphologie, Leser, H., Braunschweig 2009

Ćalić (2009), Uvala – contribution to the study of Karst depressions (with selected examples from Dinarides and Carpatho-Balkanides. Ćalić, J., Nova Gorica 2009

Ahnert (2009), Einführung in die Geomorphologie, Ahnert, F., Aachen 2009

Pfeiffer (2010), Karst, Entstehung – Phänomene – Nutzung, Pfeiffer, K.-H., Stuttgart 2010

Murawski (2010), Geologisches Wörterbuch, Murawski, Hans. & Meyer, Wilhelm., Heidelberg, 2010, 12. Auflage

Mihevc et al. (2010), Introduction to the Dinaric Karst, Mihevc, A., Prelovšek, M., Zupan Hajna, N. (Eds.), Postojna 2010

Ćalić (2011), Karstic uvala revisited: Toward a redefinition of the term. Ćalić, J., Geomorphology 134, 2011

Zupan Hanja (2012), Dinaric Karst: Geography and geology, Zupan Hajna, N., Eintrag in: Culver & White (2012)

Culver & White (2012), Encyclopedia of Caves, Culver, D. C., White, W.B., Burlington, MA, 2nd ed. 2012

Vlahović et al. (2012), Marine to continental depositional systems of Outer Dinarides forland in intra-montane basins, Fieldtrip Guide. Vlahović, I, und 8 weitere Autoren. 29th IAS Meeting of Sedimentology, Journal of Alpine Geology, 54, Wien 2012.

Palomares Martin (2012), Los paisajes de la comarca del Jiloca, Palomares Martin, M., Valencia 2012
