= List of caves in Croatia =

This list of caves in Croatia includes 49 which are deeper than 250 m (820 ft), 14 deeper than 500 m (1,640 ft) and three deeper than 1,000 m (3,281 ft). The karst geology includes a total of approximately 7,000 caves and pits.

== Deepest caves ==
Name	Depth	Length	Geology and notes
Velebit Caves - Lukina jama	1,392 m (4,567 ft)		
Velebit Caves – Slovačka jama	1,320 m (4,330 ft)		
Velebit Caves – near Crikvena	1,034 m (3,392 ft)		
Crnopac cave system	830 m (2,720 ft)		
Biokovo caves – Amfora Pit	788 m (2,585 ft)		
Velebit Caves – Meduza	679 m (2,228 ft)		
Biokovo caves – Stara škola	576 m (1,890 ft)		
Biokovo caves – Vilimova jama	572 m (1,877 ft)		
Velebit Caves – Patkov Gušt	553 m (1,814 ft)		
Velebit Caves – Jama Olimp	537 m (1,762 ft)		
Velebit Caves – Ledena jama u Lomskoj dulibi	536 m (1,759 ft)		
Stupina jama	413 m (1,355 ft)	251 m (823 ft)	Deepest cave in Gorski Kotar

== Longest caves ==
Name	Length	Depth	Geology and notes
Crnopac cave system	59.030 km (36.68 mi)	830 m (2,720 ft)	
Medvedica caves – Đulin ponor	16,396 m (53,793 ft)		
Varićakova špilja – Panjkov ponor	12,385 m (40,633 ft)		
Tounj quarry cave	8,487 m (27,844 ft)		
Veternica	7,128 m (23,386 ft)	50 m (160 ft)	
Javornica kod Bizeka	330 m (1,080 ft)	28 m (92 ft)	
Sutinščica	254 m (833 ft)	5.5 m (18 ft)	
Pivnica	180 m (590 ft)	51 m (167 ft)	
Đot	146 m (479 ft)	42 m (138 ft)	
Kranjča špilja	125 m (410 ft)	27 m (89 ft)	

== Other notable caves ==
Name	Depth	Length	Geology and notes
Caves of Barać			
Baredine Cave	60 m (200 ft)	132 m (433 ft)	
Bijele sige	27 m (89 ft)	95 m (312 ft)	
Biserujka		110 m (360 ft)	Near Dobrinj, on the island of Krk
Crveno jezero (the Red Lake)			Near Imotski
Javornica kod Bizeka	28 m (92 ft)	330 m (1,080 ft)	
Velebitaška jama	45 m (148 ft)	70 m (230 ft)	
Vrtare Male	30 m (98 ft)		Contains megafauna remains from the last ice age
Balinka pit	328 m (1,076 ft)		
Romuald’s Cave			Noted for cave paintings

== See also ==
- List of caves
- List of Dinaric caves
- Speleology

== Sources ==
- The Speleological Committee of the Croatian Mountaineering Association, ed. (2011-11-14). "Croatian caves deeper than 250 m / longer than 1000 m". Croatian Mountaineering Association.
