= ADEA =

ADEA may refer to:

- The Age Discrimination in Employment Act of 1967, a US labor law
- Association for the Development of Education in Africa
- American Dental Education Association
- Adeia Inc. (stock ticker symbol "ADEA")

== See also ==
- Adea
