= Adeli =

Adeli may refer to:

- Adeli, Benin
- Adeli suit

== People with the surname ==
- Assadollah Adeli, Iranian fighter pilot
- Mohammad-Hossein Adeli, Iranian diplomat
- Mohsen Adeli (born 1972), Iranian chemist

== See also ==
- Adelia (disambiguation)
- Adele (disambiguation)
