= Danielle (disambiguation) =

Danielle is a feminine given name. It may also refer to:

== People ==
- Adea Danielle, Canadian social media influencer and transgender advocate
- Charles Henry Danielle (1830–1902), American-born Newfoundland costume designer, restauranteur, and resort owner
- Diana Danielle (born 1991), American-born Malaysian actress and singer
- Megan Danielle, runner-up in American Idol season 21
- Suzanne Danielle (born 1957), stage name of English former actress Suzanne Morris
- Danielle (singer) (born 2005), stage name of Australian and South Korean singer Danielle Marsh

== Other uses ==
- List of storms named Danielle
- " Danielle (Smile on My Face)", a track on the 2022 album Actual Life 3 (January 1 – September 9 2022) by Fred Again

== See also ==
- Daniele (disambiguation)
