= Adea =

Adea is a given name. Notable people with the name include:

- Adea Danielle, Canadian social media influencer
- Adea Pirdeni (born 1963), Albanian politician

== See also ==
- ADEA (disambiguation)
- Adeia (disambiguation)
