= Adel =

Adel may refer to:

== Places ==
=== United States ===
- Adel, Georgia
- Adel, Indiana
- Adel, Iowa
- Adel Township, Dallas County, Iowa
- Adel, Oklahoma
- Adel, Oregon
- Adel Mountains Volcanic Field, West-central Montana

=== Elsewhere ===
- Adelaide, Australia
- Adel, Leeds, England
- Adilabad, Telangana, India
- Adilabad district, Telangana, India
- Al-Adel, Baghdad, Iraq
- Adel, Republic of Bashkortostan, Russia
- Adel Sultanate

== People ==
- Adel (name), a unisex first name of northern-European origin, or a last name
- Adil, an Arabic first name (male) and last name

== Other uses ==
- Adel (official), a public official in Morocco
- Adel, German nobility
- Adel, Dutch nobility
- Adel, Danish nobility
- Adel, Swedish nobility
- Adel, Norwegian nobility
- Adel, Finnish nobility
- Adel, Icelandic nobility
- Adel, an Egyptian ferry that capsized and sank in May 1963
- Adel, a game character of Final Fantasy VIII
- Adel, a weevil/beetle genus of the Pentarthrini tribe
- List of storms named Adel

== See also ==
- Adelaide (disambiguation)
- Adele (disambiguation)
- Aedile, an office of the Roman Republic
- Aetheling, an Old English noble title
