= Adele (disambiguation) =

Adele (born 1988) is an English singer-songwriter.

Adele may also refer to:

== People ==
- Adele (given name), a common female given name
- Jan Adele (1936–2000), Australian actor
- Adeniji Adele (1893–1964), Oba (King) of Lagos
- Adele, a character in the operetta Die Fledermaus

== Places ==
- Adele, California or Fields Landing, California
- Adele, Kentucky, an unincorporated community
- Adele Island (Australia), Western Australia
- Adele Island (New Zealand), off the northern coast of South Island of New Zealand
- Adele, Ethiopia, village in the Shinile Zone of Ethiopia
- Adele, town in the Amigna woreda of Ethiopia

== Ships ==
- Australian steamer Adele
- French brig Adèle
- Adele (1952 ship), Swiss merchant ship
- Adèle (1800 brig), privateer brig, later an armed brig for the British East India Company, and a fire ship for the Royal Navy

== Film and theatre ==
- Adele (film), a 1919 film by Wallace Worsley
- Adele (musical), a 1913 musical

== Other uses ==
- Adele language, a language spoken in Ghana and Togo
- Adele people of Ghana and Togo
- 812 Adele, an asteroid
- Adele ring, a concept in topological algebra

== See also ==
- Portrait of Adele Bloch-Bauer I and Adele Bloch-Bauer II, paintings by Gustav Klimt
- Adel (disambiguation)
- Adela (disambiguation)
- Adell (disambiguation)
- Adeli (disambiguation)
- Adélie (disambiguation)
