= Adell =

Adell may refer to:

- Adell, Wisconsin, US, a village
- Adell Township, Sheridan County, Kansas, US, a township
- Adell (surname)
- Adell Vera Hall (1902–1964), American folk singer
- Adell, a main character in the video game Disgaea 2: Cursed Memories

== See also ==
- Adel (disambiguation)
- Adele (disambiguation)
- Adela (disambiguation)
