= Adeia (disambiguation) =

Adeia (fl. 4th – 3rd centuries BCE) was a Greek noblewoman.

Adeia may also refer to:

- Adeia (plant)
- Adeia (company)

== See also ==
- Adea, a given name
- Mugilogobius adeia, a freshwater fish
- Adela (disambiguation)
