= Adelia Field Johnston =

American educator (1837–1910)

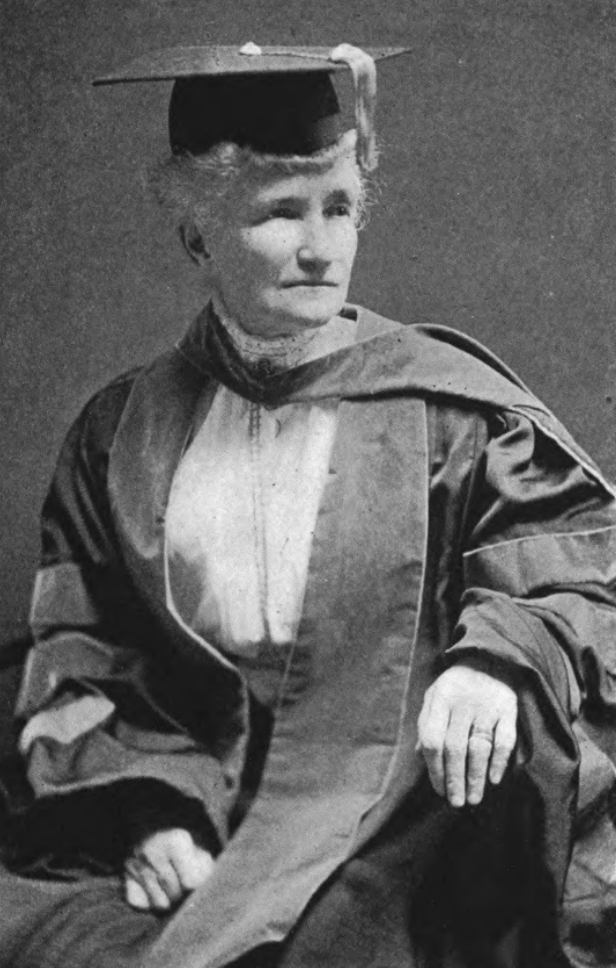
- Adelia Field Johnston, from a 1912 publication
- Born: Adelia Antoinette Field; February 5, 1837; Lafayette, Ohio, US
- Died: July 22, 1910; Oberlin, Ohio, US
- Occupation(s): Educator, college administrator
- Known for: Dean of Women at Oberlin College, 1870-1900; first female faculty member at Oberlin College

Adelia Antoinette Field Johnston (February 5, 1837 – July 22, 1910) was an American educator and college administrator. She was the first female faculty member at Oberlin College, where she taught history, and the school's Dean of Women from 1870 to 1900.

== Early life ==
Adelia Antoinette Field was born in Lafayette, Ohio, the daughter of Leonard Field and Margaret Gridley Field. At age 13, she taught school for three weeks, while the assigned adult teacher was ill with measles. She attended Geauga Seminary and then Oberlin College. She graduated from Oberlin's literary course in 1856. In widowhood in the 1860s, she pursued further studies in Latin and in German, including an extended study trip to Germany. She later received an honorary master's degree from Hillsdale College, and in 1906 an honorary doctor of laws degree from Western Reserve University.

== Career ==
Field taught in Mossy Creek, Tennessee before she married in 1859, and she taught with her husband in Orwell, Ohio. She was principal at schools in Ohio and Rhode Island.

Johnston served as principal and dean of the Women's Department of Oberlin College from 1870 to 1900, and became the college's first female faculty member in 1878, when she began teaching history courses. She was appointed Professor of Medieval History in 1890.

Johnston was also active in the town of Oberlin, Ohio, holding art exhibitions, supporting a natural history club, and cleaning up unsightly lots in the town as a founder of the Oberlin Village Improvement Society. She traveled to Norway, Spain, Egypt and Algeria, and gave a lectures about her travels, including a lecture on Norway at the World's Columbian Exposition in Chicago in 1893. She wrote a novel, Two Sides of a Shield: A Story of the Civil War (1911).

== Personal life and legacy ==
Adelia Field married fellow Oberlin alumnus James Mix Johnston in 1859; he died in 1862. Adelia A. Field Johnston died in 1910, aged 73 years, at her home in Oberlin. Harriet Louise Keeler wrote a biography of Johnston, published in 1912.

Oberlin College has a professorship named for Johnston, and a travel fellowship for Oberlin alumni.
