= Croatian Mountaineering Association =

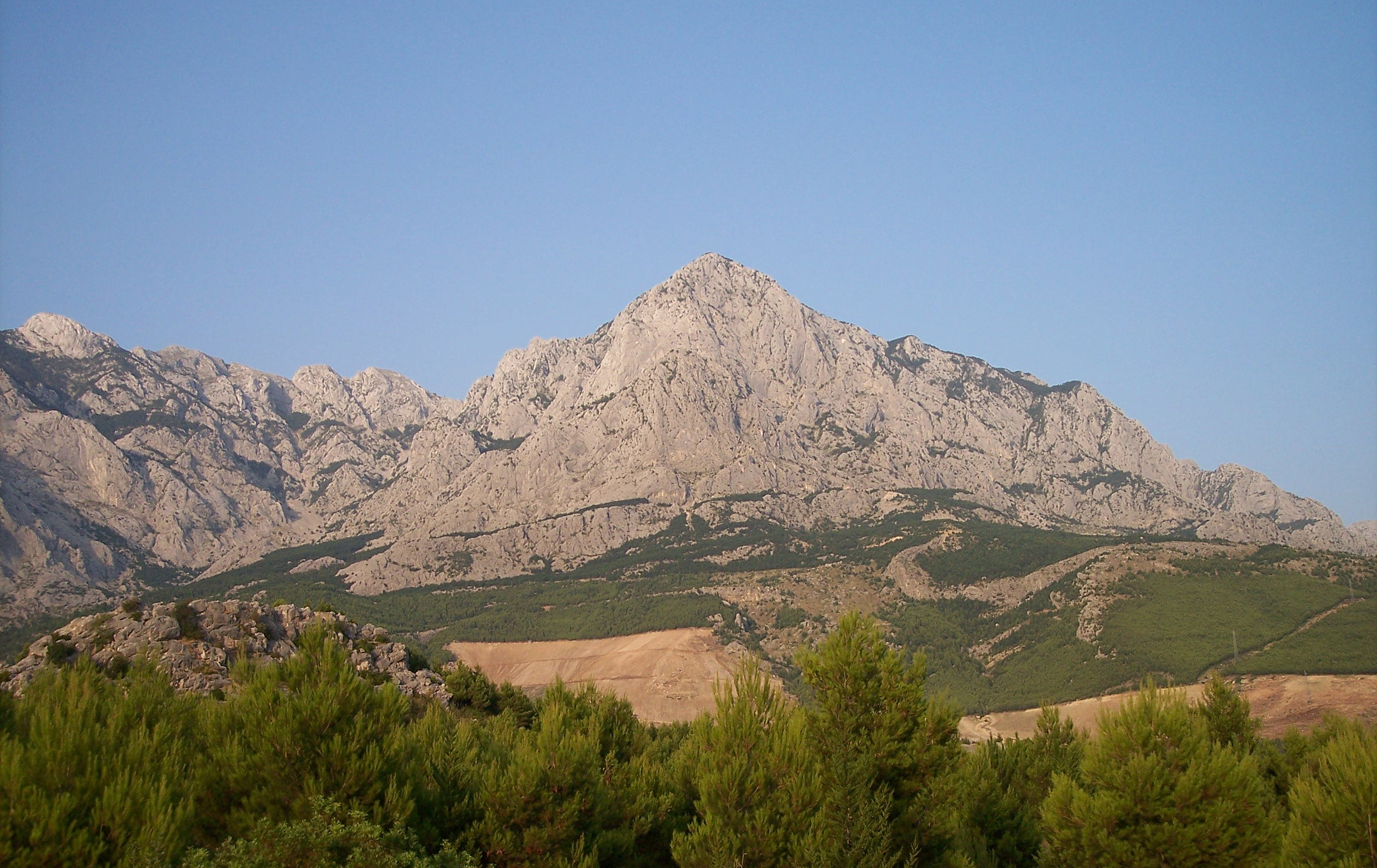
Biokovo Mountain at Baška Voda

The Croatian Mountaineering Association (Croatian: Hrvatski planinarski savez) covers both mountaineering and a broad range of related activities. Unlike the majority of the international mountaineering associations, the association's remit extends to speleology, climbing, orienteering and mountain rescue.

The association is responsible for the maintenance of mountain huts and paths in Croatia, and is the publisher of the magazine Hrvatski planinar (The Croatian Mountaineer) and of other promotional materials. Through schools and courses it provides relevant professional education and training. It is a comprehensive source of information of all kinds relating to Croatian mountains and mountaineering.

The operations of the Croatian Mountaineering Association are managed by its executive committee and its professional work is carried out through the commissions for:

- Mountain Rescue;
- Guiding;
- Caving;
- Alpinism;
- Competition Climbing;
- Orienteering;
- Promotion & Publications;
- Mountain Paths;
- Environment;
- Awards;
- Husbandry;
- Legal matters;
- History of Mountaineering.

Members of the Association and members of the UIAA have a 50% discount on the cost of a night's accommodation in all huts in Croatia. Currently the Association numbers some 20,000 registered members from over 200 clubs and regional associations.

The association has created the Hrvatska planinarska obilaznica (HPO) or Croatian Mountaineering Bypass, a list of the most attractive peaks in all Croatian mountains with the intention of not only to bring as many people as possible to interesting peaks, but also to instruct them to get to know the beauties of the Croatian mountains systematically, in a targeted and thoughtful way. Each of the 153 peaks have a checkpoint and metal stamp which the hiker can record their visit in a log book or passport (as the Croatians call it).

The predecessor organization Croatian Climbing Society (Croatian: Hrvatsko planinarsko društvo, HPD) was founded in 1874, which puts the Croats among the first seven nations in the world with a climbing organization. Organised climbing activity in Croatia was directed in its early days towards scientific research into the natural features of the mountains, rather than towards the conquest of peaks as an end in itself. This focus was one reason for the extent to which leading university professors and scientists were represented in the membership of the society in the 20th century.

== Medal ==
Since 1962, the HPS has been awarding gold, silver and bronze medals to members that have distinguished themselves that year. Formerly also awarded to members of national mountaineering associations of other constituent republics. Gold medal recipients:

- 1962: Petar Armanini, Anton Beučić, Nevenka Bubanj, Stjepan Car Dragan Eger, Đuka Horkić, Branko Kiraly, Ivan Magdić, Petar Šafarik, Aleksandar Vrbaški, Josip Zobunđija
- 1963:
- 1964:
- 1965: Đuro Habdija
- 1966:
- 1967: Nikola Alba, Ante Batinić, Ivan Fraj, Ivan Grubišić, Martin Krivak, Aleksandar Lehpamer
- 1968: Srećko Božičević, Vladimir Božić, Adolf Frančeški, Vjenceslav Jurić, Ivan Kalić, Dragutin Ladenhauzer, Josip Leskovšek, Zvonko Lovreković, Anđelko Lozej, Ivan Meglu, August Mravlja, Velimir Neferović, Vladislav Novak, Stjepan Piljek, Viktor Pompe, Slavko Smolec, Ljudevit Staničić, Dragan Šafar, Zorka Šafar-Gruden, Veljko Šegrc, Ivan Šepl, Hinko Vilfan, Blaž Zadravec
- 1969: Miroslav Ganza, Kamilo Firinger, Miroslav Matošević, Mišo Matošević
- 1970: Anka Dragašević, Božidar Dragašević, Vilma Frančeski, Miroslav Kadić, Dragica Ličina, Justina Lozej, Ivan Marion, Karlo Matz, Vladimir Mirosavljević, Paula Neferović, Stjepan Pernek, Vlado Polchert, Ruža Pompe, Karlo Posarić, Ivan Viličić
- 1971:
- 1972:
- 1973: Ivan Balint, Đuro Kirhmajer
- 1974:
- 1975: Marija Bistrički, Franjo Jerman, Antun Kralj, Ćiril Krešić, Josip Lončarić, Ivan Lutz, Dragutin Malek, Slavko Marjanac, Krešimir Ormanec, Ankica Pondelak, Đuro Pondelak, Juraj Posarić, Stjepan Sirovec, Drago Šafran, Dragutin Turković
- 1976: Marijan Jalžetić, Milivoj Kovačić, Josip Muha
- 1977:
- 1978: Vilko Igrić, Ante Kvaternik, Franciska Majerić, Josip Sakoman, Darko Schmidt, Stanko Šafer, Franjo Znika
- 1979: Vladimir Mesarić, Ivo Oraš
- 1980: Vedran Bubanj, Josip Jung, Đurđica Matošević, Marija Puškarić
- 1981:
- 1982: Zlatko Lončarić
- 1983: Rudolf Jurić, Vladimir Solar
- 1984: Martin Pokas, Rudi Sverak
- 1985: Zdenko Balog, Zoran Bolonić, Zvonimir Brkašić, Branko Čižmeković, Ante Grgić, Branko Jalžić, Marija Koričić, Marija Kovačević, Danilo Lapanja, Nada Majerić, Žarko Mrzljak, Marijan Piljek
- 1986:
- 1987:
- 1988: Josip Pandurić
- 1989: Tomislav Kopečny, Josip Korlaet, Borut Kurtović, Ivo Puharić, Anica Staničić
- 1990: Rudolf Čus, Đuro Duić, Viktor Fon, August Kelnerić, Rudolf Mrzljak, Marko Orešković
- 1991:
- 1992:
- 1993: Juraj Filipić
- 1994:
- 1995: Frida Koren, Josip Kozina, Božena Kralj-Vrsalović, Ljiljana Pleše, Zvonimir Polaček
- 1996: Branko Blažević, Frane Dražin, Drago Erceg, Mario Gojak, Mišo Gojak, Marija Jelačić, Gordana Jurković, Tomislav Pavlin, Lilian Polaček, Davor Visković
- 1997:
- 1998: Marijan Jurić, Aleksandar Kordić, Marija Kordić, Krešimir Kovačić, Ljubica Kovačić, Ana Pleskalt, Berta Rujnić, Vera Sonenšajn
- 1999: Miljenko Spitzer
- 2000: Damir Bajs, Mladen Kuhta, Vladimir Lindić, Bernard Margitić
- 2001:
- 2002: Ivan Bedalov, Stipe Bedalov, Stipe Bušelić, Han Marin, Josip Pejša, Ivan Tadin, Ivo Tadin, Mario Tadin
- 2003: Tomislav Zoričić
- 2004: Rudolf Rukavina
- 2005: Velimir Barišić, Božena Bučar, Boris Lepan
- 2006:
- 2007: Darija Bostjančić, Anita Carević, Karolina Vranješ
- 2008: Zdravko Gazdek, Stanislav Horaček, Ivica Kušek, Josip Mataja, Ivan Rešetar
- 2009: Tonći Lalić, Blaženka Puharić, Samo Puharić, Zoja Puharić, Boris Turina
- 2010: Igor Jelinić, Zdenka Koričančić, Ivan Materljan, Neven Petrović, Robert Smolec
- 2011:
- 2012:
- 2013: Katica Bucifal, Stjepan Hanžek, Verica Havojić, Ivana Kolar, Branka Vrabec
- 2014: Alan Čaplar, Krešimir Milas, Tomislav Zoričić
- 2015: Zvonko Filipović, Dragutin Hanžek, Vladimir Lakuš, Slavko Patačko, Branko Tesla
- 2016: Damir Basara
- 2017: Ante Šarič
- 2018: Miroslav Aleksa, Zdravko Antolković, Miroslav Kanisek, Dinko Novosel, Mladen Pandurić, Miro Valio
- 2019: Tonći Grgasović, Vedrana Letica, Davor Puharić, Slobodan Soldo, Drago Šimić, Dušanka Turić
- 2020: Mea Bombardelli, Ivan Čanadi, Dalibor Jirkal, Željko Novak, Josip Povrženić
- 2021: Nela Bosner, Vitomir Murganić, Božo Pomper
- 2022:
- 2023: Josip Bočkaj, Ivan Burić, Barica Hanžek, Katica Klarić, Ivan Lončar, Boris Majerus, Vibor Sumić, Ivan Tagliaretti
- 2024: Miroslav Mitrović, Domagoj Pavlin, Milivoj Uroić
- 2025: Đuro Gustović

== See also ==
- List of mountains in Croatia
- List of caves in Croatia
