= Mohammad Masbouq =

Iranian military personnel (1950–2021)

- Born: 4 June 1950; Hamadan
- Died: 29 December 2021 (aged 71); Tehran
- Military career
- Allegiance: Iran
- Branch: Islamic Republic of Iran Air Force; Imperial Iranian Air Force
- Rank: Second brigadier general (Iran)
- Conflicts: Iran–Iraq War

Mohammad Masbouq (Persian: محمد مسبوق), (4 June 1950 – 29 December 2021) was an Iranian fighter pilot on the Grumman F-14 Tomcat who served during the Iran–Iraq War. He was an elite pilot in the Iranian Air Force, and he mainly flew with Assadullah Adeli in the rear seat as a pilot and radar intercept officer.

French military historian Pierre Razoux has credited him and his leader Assadullah Adeli with five aerial victories, a record that qualifies them as a flying ace. they hold the record for shooting down three aircraft with one single missile. This took place on 7 January 1981, when they shot down three MiG-23 fighter aircraft of the Iraqi Air Force that were flying in a close formation at around 2,000 feet over Kharg Island in the Persian Gulf. they shot them down with one AIM-54 Phoenix missile, hitting the one in the middle and damaging the other two from the explosion. Cooper and Bishop list the three MiG-23s among confirmed kills by Iranians, without being able to identify the pilots.

== Education ==
In 1968, he was hired by the army's ground force, but after a while, due to his interest in piloting, after passing the relevant tests in 1972, he was sent to Lackland, Texas, to continue. After a long period of illness, Mohammad Mesbouq died on 29 December 2021, in Tehran.
