= Adel, Republic of Bashkortostan =

Adel Адель
- Village
- Location within Bashkortostan Location within Russia
- Coordinates: 51°54′N 58°29′E
- Country: Russia
- Region: Bashkortostan
- District: Khaybullinsky District
- Time zone: UTC+5:00

Adel (Russian: Адель; Bashkir: Әҙел, Äźel) is a rural locality (a village) in Tanalyksky Selsoviet, Khaybullinsky District, Bashkortostan, Russia. The population was 159 as of 2010. There are 3 streets.

== Geography ==
Adel is located 42 km northeast of Akyar (the district's administrative centre) by road. Mambetovo is the nearest rural locality.
