= List of storms named Adel =

The name Adel has been used for one tropical cyclone in the Australian region and one European windstorm.

In the Australian region:

- Cyclone Adel (1993) – a Category 3 severe tropical cyclone that passed over Bougainville Island.

In Europe:

- Storm Adel (2025) – affected Italy, Greece, Albania, and Turkey.

== See also ==
Storms with similar names

- Tropical Depression Abel (1996) – a West Pacific Ocean tropical depression.
- Cyclone Adelaide (1980) – a South-West Indian Ocean tropical cyclone that originated in the Australian region as Cyclone Alice.
