= Adel (official) =

Adel/Adoul

In Morocco, a Adel (plural Adoul) (Arabic: عُدُول : جمع عادِل) is a public official who practices a liberal regulated profession through a set of competencies and conditions defined in Law N⁰. 16.03 related to the justice plan, and in special legal texts. This profession falls within the auxiliary professions of the Judiciary of Morocco

Adoul act in pairs to record Islamic/Shar'i marriages, known as Nikah. They may also draft contracts, prenuptial agreements, inheritance-related documents, divorce settlements and adjudicate testaments. Their office is comparable to that of a civil law notary.

== Controversy ==
On January 23, 2018, women were officially allowed to become Adoul, following a royal decree issued by King Mohammed VI of Morocco. The decision sparked significant controversy - particularly among the existing ranks of Adoul - but also the Moroccan public.

== Pronunciation ==
The term Adoul (Arabic: عُدول) is classically pronounced /ʕuːduːl/, with the voiced pharyngeal fricative ʿAyn (ع) followed by a long "u" vowel. In Moroccan Darija, however, the phonological realization of ʿAyn is often weakened or glottalized, and vowels tend to shift. As a result, the word is typically pronounced /adul/ or /aːdul/, reflecting the broader phonetic tendencies in Maghrebi Arabic to simplify guttural consonants and level short vowels in colloquial usage.

== See also ==
- Islamic/Shar'i marriage (Nikah)
- Islamic/Shar'i divorce (Talaq)
