= Adela (brig) =

1862 brig built by John Chevalier Cobbold

History

Great Britain
- Name: Adela
- Namesake: Adela Harriette Dupuis
- Owner: John Chevalier Cobbold
- Operator: Cobbold and Co.
- Builder: Cobbold
- Yard number: Cobbold Yard
- Laid down: date unknown
- Launched: 1862
- Completed: 05/1862
- Commissioned: 24/06/1862

General characteristics
- Tonnage: 180 tons
- Length: 102.7 ft
- Beam: 22.7 ft
- Armour: iron-hulled

Adela was a brig built in 1862 by John Chevalier Cobbold. It was named after Adela Harriette Dupuis who had married his son John Patteson Cobbold in 1858.
