= Association for the Development of Education in Africa =

Educational network in Africa

The Association for the Development of Education in Africa, previously known as "Donors to African Education", is a "network and partnership" established by a World Bank initiative in 1988. It groups Ministries of Education, international Development Agencies, NGOs and education specialists.

It currently focuses on helping Ministers of Education and funding agencies to coordinate their efforts to create successful education policies based on African leadership. ADEA has also become aware of the informal sector's relevance, and thus recognized the need for increased vocational school training as a way to help the informal sector.

ADEA is based in Tunis at the African Development Bank (AfDB) since August 1, 2008.

ADEA publishes a newsletter ADEA newsletter to inform about its activities.

== Programs ==
Programs include:

- The Africa Education Journalism Award, launched in 2001
- Triennale (formerly Biennial) Meetings of Ministers of Education, development agency representatives and related professionals. Meetings:
  - 2003: held in Grand Baie, Mauritius, with a theme of "Improving the Quality of Education in sub-Saharan Africa"
  - 2001: held in Arusha, Tanzania with a theme of "Reaching Out, Reaching All: Sustaining Effective Policies and Practices for Education in Africa!".
  - 1999: held in Johannesburg, South Africa, with a theme of "What works and Whats new in Education : Africa Speaks!"
- Prospective, Stock-Taking Review of Education in Africa
- Identifying Effective Responses to HIV/AIDS
- Intra-African Exchanges
