= Harriet Louise Keeler =

American teacher, botanist, and writer (1846–1921)

- Harriet Louise Keeler, from a 1937 magazine
- Born: 1846
- Died: 1921 (aged 74–75)
- Occupation: Educator

Harriet Louise Keeler (1846–1921) was an American teacher, botanist, and writer. She wrote 11 books, including plant identification guides and textbooks. The Harriet Keeler Memorial Woods in the Brecksville Reservation are named in her honor.
