= Adelie =

Adelie or Adélie may refer to:

- Adelie Hurley (1919–2010), Australia's first woman press photographer
- Adélie Land, a claimed territory on the continent of Antarctica
- Adelie Land meteorite, a meteorite discovered on December 5, 1912, in Antarctica by Francis Howard Bickerton
- Adélie penguin, a species of penguin common along the entire coast of the Antarctic continent
- Adélie Valley, a drowned fjord on the continental margin of East Antarctica
