= Assadollah Adeli =

Iranian fighter pilot

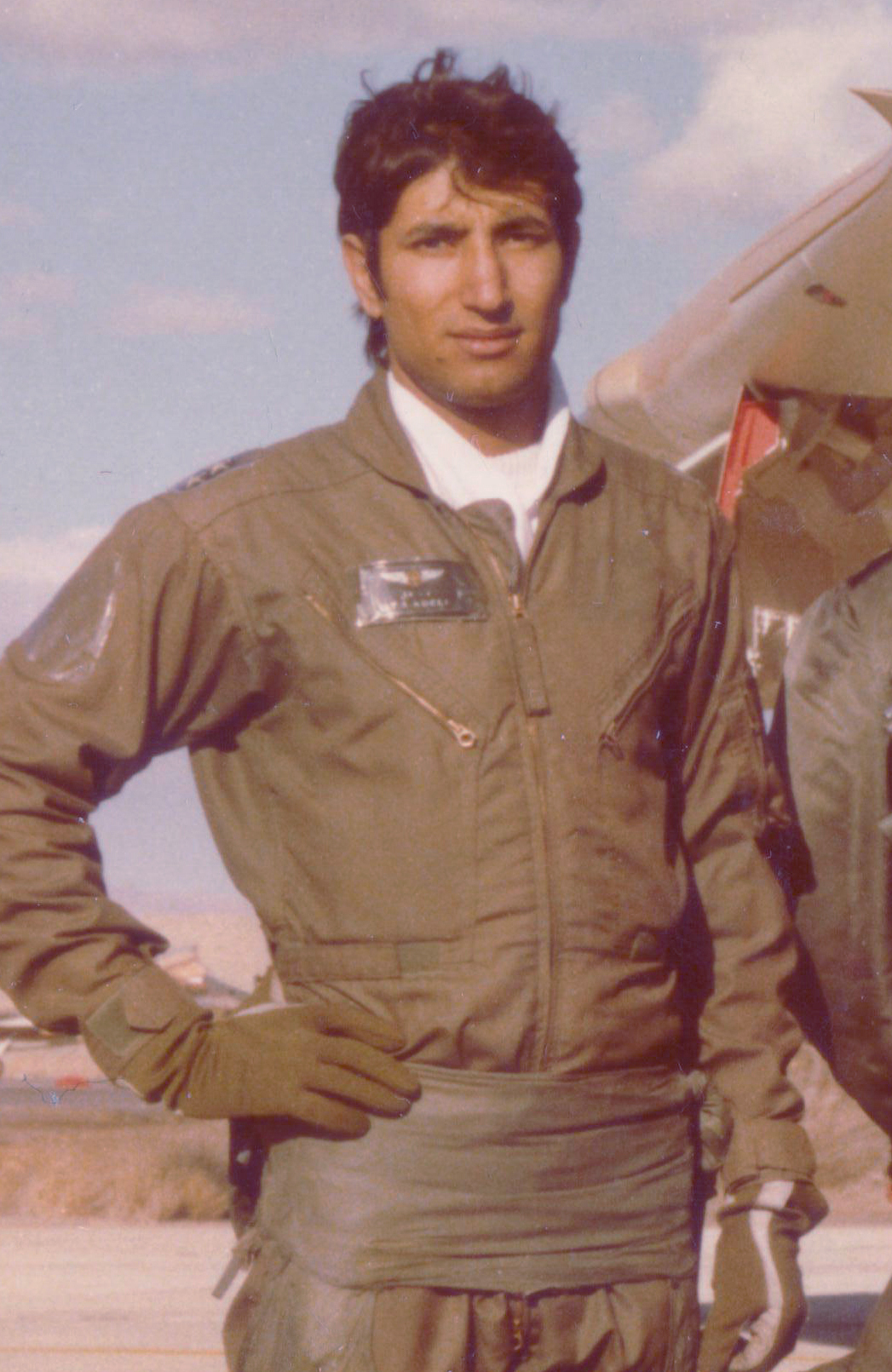
- Military career
- Allegiance: Pahlavi Iran / Islamic Republic of Iran
- Branch: Islamic Republic of Iran Air Force; Imperial Iranian Air Force
- Rank: Colonel
- Nickname: Asad
- Conflicts: Iran–Iraq War

Assadollah Adeli (Persian: اسدالله عادلی) is an Iranian retired fighter pilot on the Grumman F-14 Tomcat who served during the Iran–Iraq War. He was an elite pilot in the Iranian Air Force, and in 1977 he was one of the few pilots in the Imperial Iranian Air Force who were selected to fly the F-14. He flew the aircraft between 1980 and 1988, during the Iran-Iraq war.

French military historian Pierre Razoux has credited him with five aerial victories, a record that qualifies him as a flying ace. Together with his radar intercept officer (RIO) Mohammad Masbuq, they hold the record for shooting down three aircraft with one single missile. This took place on 7 January 1981, when they shot down three MiG-23 fighter aircraft of the Iraqi Air Force that were flying in a close formation at around 2,000 feet over Kharg Island in the Persian Gulf. They shot them down with one AIM-54 Phoenix missile, hitting the one in the middle and damaging the other two from the explosion. Cooper and Bishop list the three MiG-23s among confirmed kills by Iranians, without being able to identify the pilots.

== See also ==
- List of Iranian flying aces
