= Romuald's Cave =

Archaeological site in Croatia

- Romualdova pećina (Croatian)
- Interactive map of Romuald's Cave
- Periods: Upper Palaeolithic
- Cultures: Aurignacian
- Associated with: Early modern human
- Location: Eastern slope of the Lim channel
- Region: Istria County, Croatia

Romuald's Cave (Croatian: Romualdova pećina) is a cave in the western part of Istria County, Croatia, that contains the oldest known cave paintings in southeast Europe, as well as traces of both animal and human Upper Paleolithic habitation. Although the cave has been excavated since late 19th century, the paintings were only found in 2010, by Professor Darko Komšo, while the findings were published in Antiquity in 2019.

== Background ==
Romuald's Cave is located on the eastern slopes of the Lim channel, at an altitude of 106 m (348 ft). Beginning with the end of 19th century, it was excavated multiple times by various archaeologists. It gained notability in the 1980s with the work of Professor Mirko Malez, who was the first to note the existence of Upper Paleolithic stone tools. Subsequent research revealed further stone tools and animal remains from Pleistocene and Holocene, as well as ceramics, fauna and human skeletal remains from both the Bronze and Iron Age.

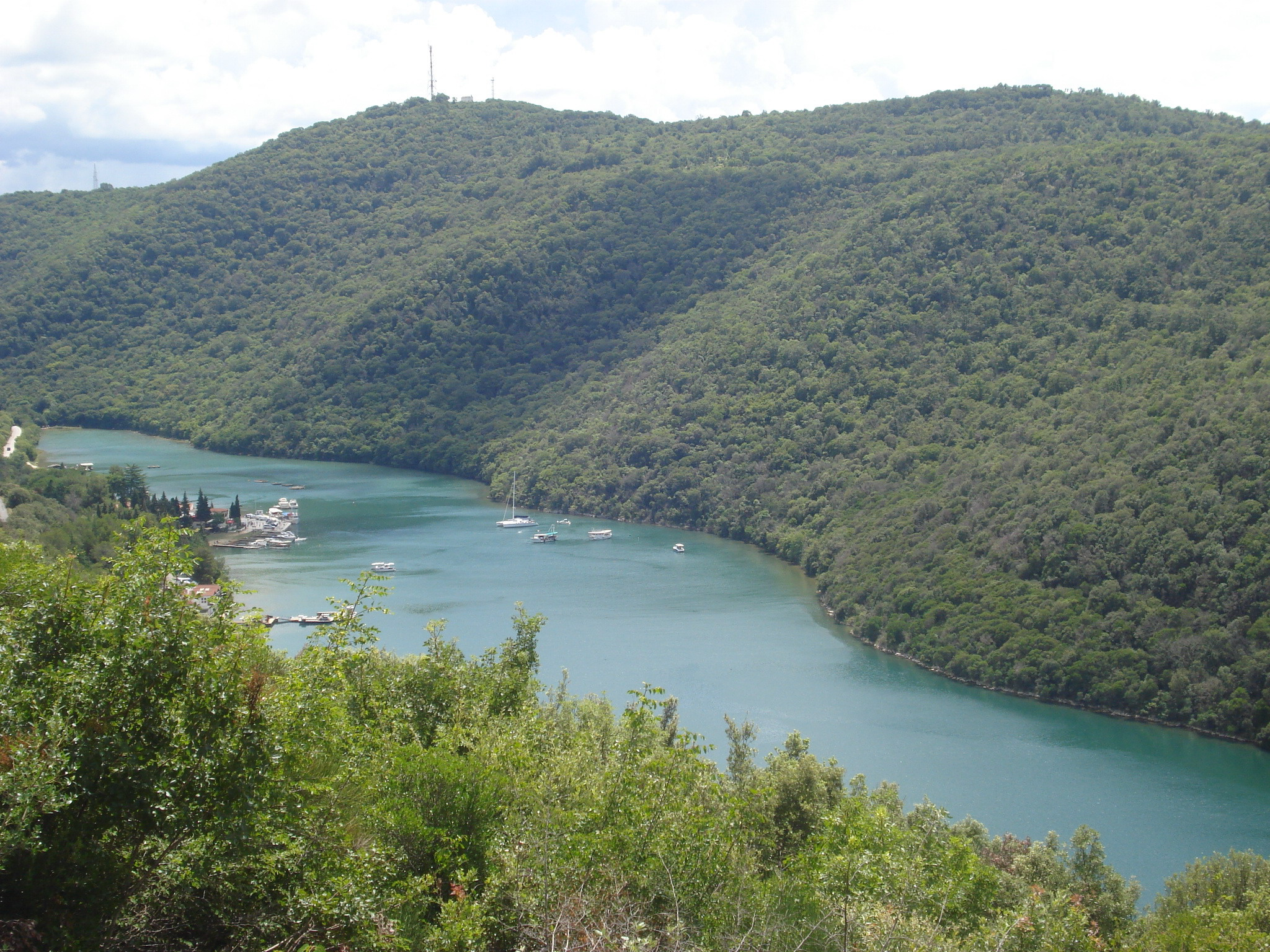
View of the eastern slopes of the Lim channel.

Five basic layers can be differentiated in the cave's stratigraphy:

- Layer A contains ceramics which can be dated to late Bronze and early Iron Age of Istria, most often decorated by grooving, fluting, incisions, fingerprints and by plastic applications in the shape of a horseshoe, zig-zag lines and buttons. Faunal remains are of badgers, rabbits, foxes and sheep. Skeletal remains of two people were found as well, one male adult above the age of 35 and one child below the age of 5, with the remains being dated to 3150 BP.
- Layer B contains rare finds of flint stone tools, which can be dated based on the stratigraphy to early Holocene or the end of Pleistocene.
- Layer C contains rare finds of flint stone tools and numerous finds of fauna, which weren't published.
- Layer D contains stone tools which can be dated back to the Middle Paleolithic, with the age of the layer in which they were found being ~40-50 thousand years old, based on radiocarbon dating. Evidence of fauna is numerous, with remains of animals such as cave bears, red deer, canines etc. being found.
- Layer E is believed to be older than 50 thousand years, with only a few artefacts being found, which were at the border between layers D and E

== Paintings ==
A total of 44 paintings were found in Roumald's Cave. The paintings, all of which were made with red pigment, stretch between 32–46 m (105–151 ft) from the entrance, and are divided into four panels: three on the left and one on the right wall. 28 out of 44 paintings are located on the left panel L2, which also contains all four of the cave's figurative depictions. Two badly preserved depictions are anthropomorphic, depicting humans, one of which appears to have an erection.

Two of the four figurative depictions are of animals: a bison and an ibex. As the bison was extinct in southern Europe by 13.3 to 12 thousand BP, it sets the terminus post quem for the cave art. The U-shaped horns, on both sides of the bison's head, are a convention specific to the Early Upper Paleolithic and can be found in cave art across Europe. The ibex is likewise a common depiction in Upper Paelolithic iconography. The red stain covering both the head and the front of the ibex are a convention of cave art in western Europe, especially those which pre-date the Magdalenian period.

== Dating ==
The dating of the cave paintings was based on three factors: the style of the paintings themselves, the dating of evidence of human habitation at the cave entrance, and radiocarbon dating of three charcoal samples near the paintings.

There is a noted difference in dates obtained from the habitation traces at the cave entrance, and from those obtained through radiocarbon dating of the charcoal samples. The chronology of dates at the cave entrance is dated to 34 to 31.5 thousand BP, while two of the charcoal samples return a date of 17 thousand BP, and one charcoal sample returning a date of 12.7 thousand BP. With the disparity of present evidence, two possible chronological hypotheses are possible for the cave art: they can either be dated to the Early Upper Paleolithic (34-31 thousand BP), or to the Epigravettian (17 thousand BP), although one of the dates gotten through the radiocarbon dating would then have to be assumed as contaminated.

== See also ==
- Art of the Upper Paleolithic
- List of Stone Age art
- List of caves in Croatia
- List of Dinaric caves
