= Biserujka =

Karst cave on the island of Krk, Croatia

Veternica
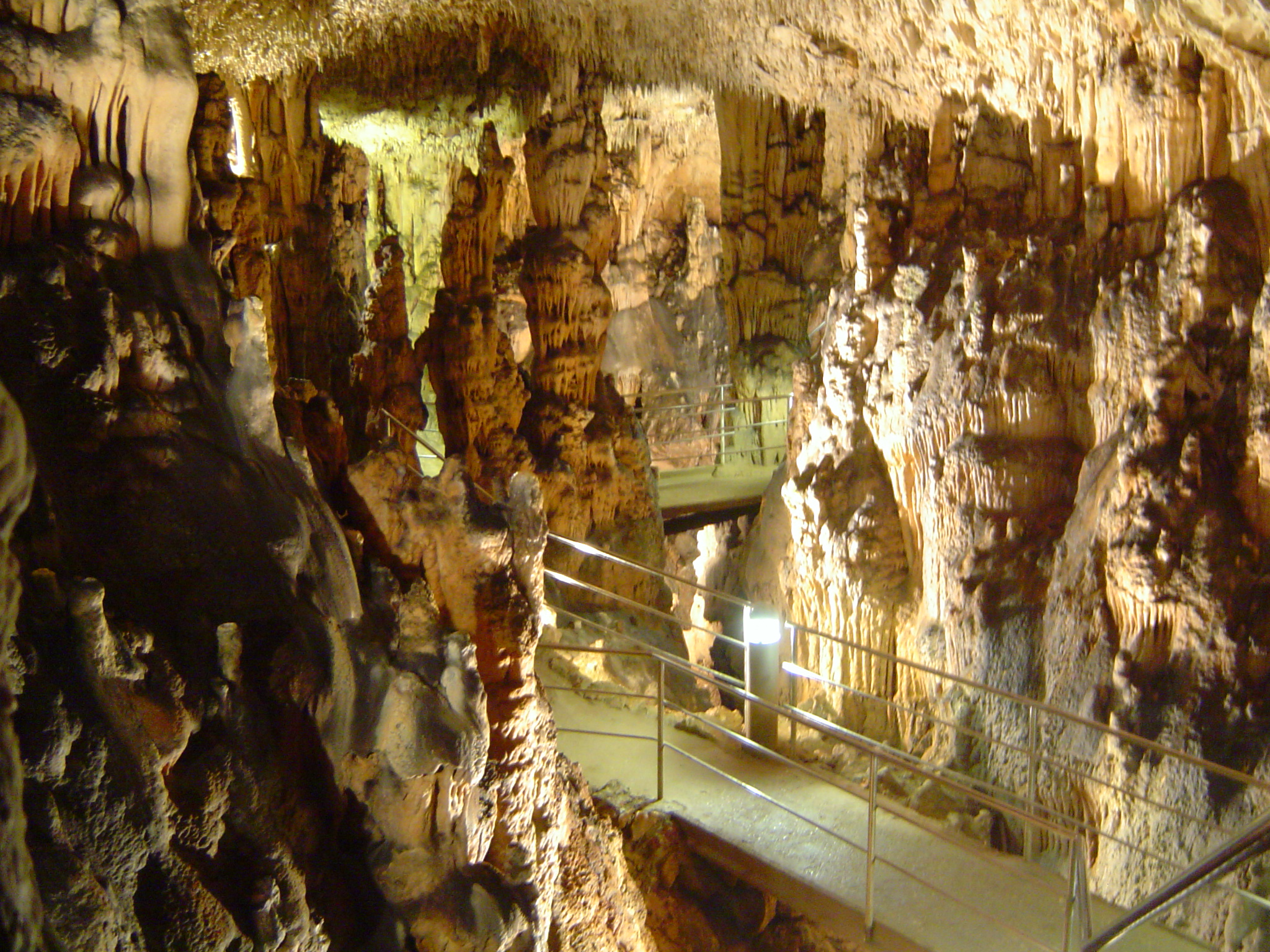
- View inside

- Location within Croatia
- Interactive map of Veternica
- Location: Rudine
- Coordinates: 45.1874°N 14.6098°E
- Depth: 12 metres (39 ft)
- Length: 110 metres (0.068 mi)
- Elevation: 65 metres (213 ft)
- Geology: Karst cave
- Access: Tours available (April – October)
- Lighting: Yes

Biserujka, also known as Omišaljska špilja, Vitezić špilja or Slivanjska jama is a cave located 6 km northeast of Dobrinj, in the village of Rudine, above the Slivanjska Bay, in the island of Krk, Croatia.

An undistinguished stone house in the middle of a bare karst landscape hides the entrance to a cave 12 m under the surface. Although it is not very long if compared to other caves, only 110 m deep, the Biserujka cave has everything that is characteristic of karst phenomena. It has typical features such as stalactites and stalagmites, and also a gallery or hall, which is suitable for the holding of concerts. However, because of the low temperature, about 13 °C, people cannot stand being there for long periods of time, so only short musical pieces are performed. Since 1998, the cave has been arranged for sightseeing and the hosts can take groups of 25 at a time.

== See also ==
- Adriatic Sea
- List of Dinaric caves

== Literature ==
- Božić, Vlado; Malinar, Hrvoje; Malinar, Marta; Brnić, Dragan; Ozimec, Roman; Jalžić, Branko; Randić, Marko; Posarić, Juraj (2009). "Špilja Biserujka na otoku Krku" [Biserujka Cave on the Island of Krk]. Speleolog (in Croatian) (57) (published 2010-04-01): 5–18. ISSN 0490-4109.

=== Biology ===
- Podnar, Martina; Tvrtković, Nikola; Vuković, Marijana; Rebrina, Fran; Grbac, Irena; Hörweg, Christoph (2022-12-30). "Alpiscorpius liburnicus sp. n. with a note on the "Alpiscorpius croaticus group" (Scorpiones: Euscorpiidae) in Croatia". Natura Croatica. 31 (2). doi:10.20302/NC.2022.31.19. eISSN 1848-7386.
- Bedek, Jana; Taiti, Stefano; Bilandžija, Helena; Ristori, Emma; Baratti, Mariella (November 2019). "Molecular and taxonomic analyses in troglobiotic Alpioniscus (Illyrionethes) species from the Dinaric Karst (Isopoda: Trichoniscidae)". Zoological Journal of the Linnean Society. 187 (3). doi:10.1093/zoolinnean/zlz056. ISSN 0024-4082.
- Graham, Matthew R.; Webber, Michael M.; Blagoev, Gergin; Ivanova, Natalia; Fet, Victor (2012-12-31). "Molecular and morphological evidence supports the elevation of Euscorpius germanus croaticus Di Caporiacco, 1950 (Scorpiones: Euscorpiidae) to E. croaticus stat. nov., a rare species from Croatia" (PDF). Revista Ibérica de Aracnología (21): 41–50. ISSN 1576-9518.
- Slapnik, Rajko (2005-07-15). "Rasprostranjenost troglobiontnih puževa iz roda Zospeum na području krša Hrvatske". Subterranea Croatica. 3 (4): 24–29. ISSN 1334-5281.
- Christian, Erhard; Potočnik, Franc (1985). "Ein Beitrag zur Kenntnis der Höhlenfauna der Insel Krk". Biološki vestnik. 33 (1): 13–19. ISSN 0520-1969.
- Potočnik, Franc (1983). "Alpioniscus (Illyrionethes) christiani spec. nov., eine neue Trichoniscinae-Art (Isopoda terrestria) aus Jugoslawien / Alpioniscus (Illyrionethes) christiani, spec. nov., a new Trichoniscinae — species (Isopoda terrestria) from Yugoslawie" (PDF). Annalen des Naturhistorischen Museums in Wien. 84B: 389–395. ISSN 0255-0105.

=== Geology ===
- Šegina, Ela (2021-11-21). Spatial Analysis in Karst Geomorphology: An Example from Krk Island, Croatia (Thesis). Springer Theses. eISSN 2190-5061. ISBN 978-3-030-61449-2.
- Malez, Mirko (1965). "Kvartarološka i speleološka istraživanja u 1965. godini" [Quaternary and Speleological Research in the Year 1965]. Ljetopis Jugoslavenske akademije znanosti i umjetnosti (in Croatian). 72: 405–417. ISSN 0373-9902.
- Božičević, Srećko (1965). Vitezić Špilja na otoku Krku. Zagreb: Hrvatski geološki institut.
- Lončar, Nina (2012). Izotopni sastav siga iz speleoloških objekata istočnojadranskih otoka kao pokazatelj promjena u paleookolišu (Thesis). Zagreb: Prirodoslovno-matematički fakultet.

=== History ===
- Posarić, Juraj (2008-08-01). "Svjetlo, Habib! Svjetlo! Manita peć u Paklenici i Grapčeva špilja na Hvaru - prve hrvatske špilje osvjetljene solarnom energijom" [Light, Habib! Light! Manita peć in Paklenica and Grapčeva špilja on Hvar - the First Croatian Caves Lit with Solar Energy]. Speleolog (in Croatian) (55): 14–23. ISSN 0490-4109.
- Božić, Vladimir (2006-12-29). "Stari natpisi u nekim hrvatskim špiljama" [Ancient Inscriptions in Some Croatian Caves]. Speleolog (in Croatian) (33): 27–43. ISSN 0490-4109.
- Božičević, Srećko (1996). Špilja Biserujka ( Vitezić pećina ) otok Krk: prijedlog za turističko uređenje. Dobrinj: Hrvatski geološki institut.
- Hirc, Dragutin (1905). "Slivanjska jama". Prirodni zemljopis Hrvatske. p. 706.

=== Tourism ===
- Žauhar, Gordana; Čargonja, Marija; Trinajstić, Nina; Mance, Diana; Mekterović, Darko (2024). "Radon levels in Biserujka cave and assesessment of effective dose received by visitors and tourist guides". Twelfth International Conference of Radiation, Natural Sciences, Medicine, Engineering, Technology and Ecology: Conference Book of Abstracts (PDF). ISBN 978-86-901150-7-5. Tirage: 20.
- Valić, Petra (2023-09-25). Mjerenje radona u okolišu (Thesis). Rijeka: Medicinski fakultet Sveučilišta u Rijeci.
- Knežević, Rade; Grbac Žiković, Renata (2011). "Analysis of the Condition and Development Opportunities of Cave Tourism in Primorsko - Goranska County" (PDF). Turizam. 15: 11–25. eISSN 1450-6661.
- Bočić, Neven; Lukić, Aleksandar; Opačić, Vuk Tvrtko (2007-12-01). "Management Models and Development of Show Caves as Tourist Destinations in Croatia". Acta Carsologica. 35 (23): 13–21. ISSN 0583-6050.
- Božić, Vladimir (1999). "Špilja Biserujka (Vitezić špilja)". Speleološki turizam u Hrvatskoj: vodič po uređenim i pristupačnim špiljama i jamama. Zagreb: Ekološki glasnik. pp. 96–99. ISBN 953-97331-8-9.
