= Delia (disambiguation) =

Delia is a feminine given name.

Delia may also refer to:

== Places ==
- Delia, Alberta, Canada, a village
- Delia, Sicily, Italy, a comune in the province of Caltanissetta
- Delia, Kansas, United States, a city
- Delia (crater), a minor crater on the Moon
- 395 Delia, an asteroid

== Surname ==
- Adrian Delia (born 1969), Maltese politician and lawyer
- Carlos César Delía (1923–2014), Argentine Army general and Olympic equestrian
- Collin Delia (born 1994), American ice hockey goaltender
- Marcos Delía (born 1992), Argentine-Italian basketball player

== Other uses ==
- Delia (festival), an ancient Greek festival
- Delia (clothing), a historical item of apparel of Polish nobility
- Delia (fly), a genus of flies
- Delia's, a clothing manufacturer and catalogue
- Delia (sonnet cycle) by Samuel Daniel
- The Delia Group of Schools, an education organisation in Hong Kong
- "Delia" (song) a traditional American folk/blues song
- DeLiA, a German literary prize
- Tropical Storm Delia (1973)

== See also ==
- Delias, butterfly genus
- dELiA*s, a defunct direct marketing and retail company targeting young women aged 13 to 19
- Delian League
- Dalia (disambiguation)
