= Adelita =

Adelita or Adelitas may refer to:

== In people ==
- Adelita Domingo (1930-2012), Spanish dancer, songwriter, concert pianist, teacher
- Adelita Grijalva (born 1970), American politician

== In music ==
- Adelita, a classical guitar piece by Spanish composer Francisco Tárrega
- Adelitas Way, a music group from Las Vegas, Nevada
- "La Adelita", a corrido (folk song) of the Mexican Revolution (1910-1920)

== In other ==
- Adelita (turtle), the first sea turtle tracked across an ocean basin by satellite
- Adelita, the alias of Luisa Espina, a fictional revolutionary who plays a pivotal role in Mayans M.C.
- Adelitas, a synonym for Soldaderas, women in the military who participated in the conflict of the Mexican Revolution, after "La Adelita"
- La Adelita, a 1973 black-and-white film by Gabriel Figueroa
