= Adea Danielle =

Canadian social media influencer

Adea Danielle is a Canadian social media influencer and transgender advocate from Montréal, Québec. She shares her experiences as a transgender woman on online platforms, focusing on education, awareness, and personal stories about transitioning and related challenges.

== Early life ==
Adea Danielle, born in Canada, became aware of her gender identity during her teenage years. At the age of 16, she discovered she was transgender after watching a YouTube video that resonated with her personal experiences. Following this realization, she came out to her mother and began her gender transition process, which included hormone therapy and later undergoing gender-affirming surgery in 2021.

== Career ==
Danielle pursued a career as a social media influencer and content creator, addressing transgender issues through her content. Her work included creating comedy videos with educational elements aimed at increasing understanding of transgender topics. Over two years, she grew her TikTok following to 1.5 million before her account was deleted without warning, an action she believed reflected biases against trans creators on the platform. Although the account was later reinstated, she expressed concerns over the platform's lack of transparency regarding bans.

Danielle has maintained an Instagram following of over 472,000 as of 2026, where she posts content focused on her experiences and perspectives as a transgender woman.

== Personal life ==
Danielle underwent gender-affirming surgery in 2021 but later expressed regret due to post-surgical complications. These complications required her to perform daily dilation to prevent medical issues, which she described as a physically and emotionally demanding routine.

In her personal relationships, Danielle has shared that she experiences challenges related to societal attitudes towards transgender individuals. She often chooses not to disclose her transgender identity early in dating to avoid judgment and to allow potential partners to know her without preconceived notions.

== Internet presence ==
Adea Danielle is associated with a viral TikTok audio known as the "Yes, yes, yes… just like that" meme. The sound, taken from one of her videos, has been widely used across X and TikTok.

She later discussed the meme's origin and rise in popularity in a TikTok video. The clip spread quickly online and circulated notably within X communities, including among gay users.
