= Velebit Caves =

Caves in Croatia

Coordinates: 44°46′01″N 15°01′35″E

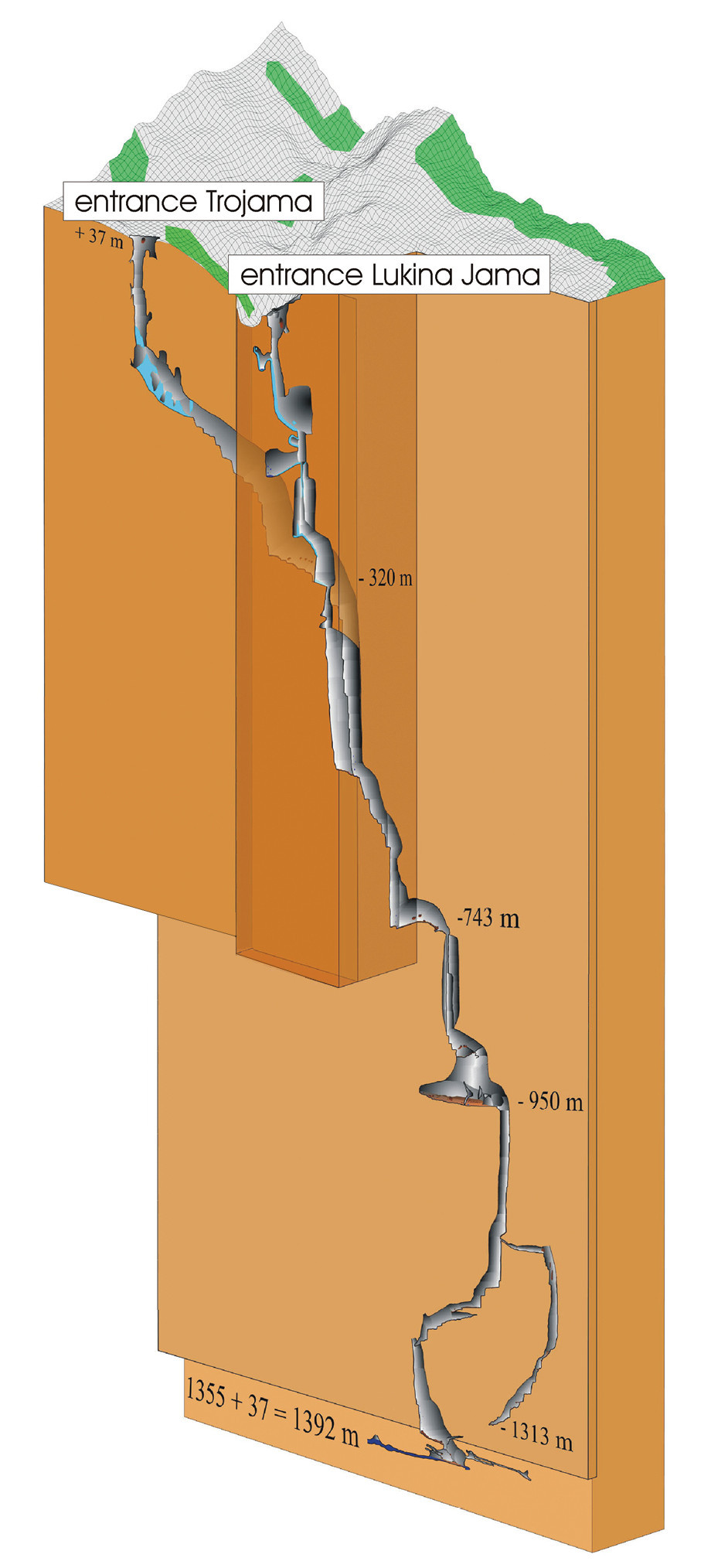
The Lukina Jama–Trojama cave system. Overview of the geographical position and 3D cave cross-section

The Velebit mountains of Croatia have several deep caves with some of the world's largest subterranean vertical drops.

The "Lukina jama" cave is 1431 m deep (2013), the deepest cave in Croatia and 17th deepest cave in the world and the deepest cave in southeast Europe. At its foot, there are ponds and streams including one of the largest known colonies of subterranean leeches (Erpobdella mestrovi), which has been ascertained to represent a new species, genus and also family. Other species discovered in the system, include the air-breathing land snails Zospeum tholussum. Like Lukina jama, Slovačka jama, Velebita and Meduza are also located at the "Hajdučki i Rožanski kukovi" special reserve, a dedicated part of the Sjeverni Velebit national park.

Other notable caves include the "Slovačka jama" (Slovak pit), (1,320 m deep), "Velebita" (1026 m deep with underground free fall vertical drop of 513 metres ) and "Meduza" (679 m deep).

The vertical shaft "Patkov Gušt", named after a deceased Croatian speleologist is 553 meters deep and the second deepest pitch in the world as of 2007.

== See also ==
- List of caves
- List of deepest caves
- List of Dinaric caves
- Speleology
