= Crnopac system =

Cave in Croatia

- Adela, Draženova puhaljka, Kita Gaćešina, Muda Labudova, Oaza, Vlažna Mađarica
- Location within Croatia
- Interactive map of Crnopac system
- Location: Velebit
- Coordinates: 44.26904°N 15.85256°E
- Depth: 842 metres (2,762 ft)
- Length: 67,387 metres (41.872 mi)
- Elevation: 1,043 metres (3,422 ft)
- Geology: Karst cave
- Entrances: 6
- Cadastral code: HR03054 (and others)

The Crnopac system, also known as Jamski sustav Kita Gaćešina, is the longest cave system in Croatia, and the entire Dinaric Alps.

== History ==
On 8 October 2009, the Draženova puhaljka entrance was connected to the Kita Gaćešina cave as its second entrance.

In August 2015, the Oaza entrance was discovered during a reconnaissance by Danijel Malenica and Stipe Tutiš. This entrance was connected to the Crnopac system on 13 August 2019, as the third entrance to the system.

The Vlažna Mađarica entrance was discovered in 2010. On 16 August 2024, the entrance was connected to the Crnopac system, as its sixth entrance.

On 7 November 2020, the Muda Labudova cave was connected to the Crnopac system, significantly increasing its known length.

== See also ==
- List of longest Dinaric caves

== Bibliography ==
- Barišić, Aida (2024-11-27). "Najdulji speleološki objekti u Hrvatskoj: Speleološki objekti dulji od 250 metara" [Cro Deepest Caves: Caves with Total Depth of 250+ Meters]. Hrvatski planinarski savez (in Croatian).
- SO (2024-08-16). "16. 08. 2024". HPK Sv. Mihovil. Archived from the original on 2024-09-18.
- SO (2020-11-07). "7. 11. 2020". HPK Sv. Mihovil. Archived from the original on 2021-01-27.
- Barišić, Aida; Barišić, Teo (2020). Jamski sustav Crnopac 2015. - 2020. (Kita u knjizi II – Izolacija) [Crnopac Cave System 2015–2020 (Kita in a Book II - Isolation)] (PDF) (in Croatian). ISBN 978-953-58386-1-6. Archived from the original (PDF) on 2021-09-23.
- Barišić, Aida; Barišić, Teo (2014). Kita u knjizi: 10 godina sustavnog istraživanja Jamskog sustava Kita Gaćešina - Draženova puhaljka [Kita in a Book: 10 Years of Systematic Exploration of the Cave System Kita Gaćešina - Draženova puhaljka] (PDF) (in Croatian). ISBN 978-953-58386-0-9. Archived (PDF) from the original on 2021-09-23.
