= Adela (given name) =

- Gender: Female

Origin
- Origin: Germanic
- Meaning: noble, serene

Other names
- Related names: Adalia, Adelaide, Adele, Adelheid, Adelia, Adélie, Adelina, Adeline, Adelle, Zélie, Adel

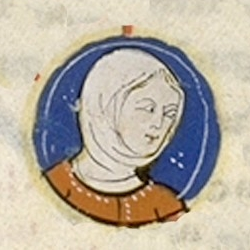
Adela of Normandy, 14th century

Adela (also spelled Adéla or Adella) is a female given name, the latinate form of Adele, meaning 'noble' or 'serene'. Adela is a male name in Ethiopia, meaning 'favours', and a female name in Arabic (عدله).

Notable people named Adela include:

== Saints ==
- Adela of Pfalzel (660-c. 735), saint and founder of convent of Pfalzel
- Adela of France (1009–1079), saint, Duchess of Normandy, and Countess of Flanders
- Adela of Normandy (1062 or 1067–1137), saint, daughter of William I of England
- Adela, mother of Saint Trudo

== Pre-modern world ==
- Adela of Champagne (c. 1140–1206), Queen of France as the third wife of King Louis VII, later regent for her son
- Adela of Flanders (c. 1064–1115), Queen consort of Denmark by marriage to King Canute IV and Duchess of Apulia
- Adela of France (1009–1063), Duchess of Normandy and Countess of Flanders
- Adela of Hamaland (952–after 1021), sovereign Countess of Hamaland in the Netherlands
- Adela of Louvain (died 1083) (died 1083), German noblewoman
- Adela of Meissen (died 1181), Danish Queen consort, spouse of King Sweyn III of Denmark
- Adela of Milan (c. 975–after 1012), Margravine of Milan by marriage
- Adela of Normandy (1062 or 1067–1137), daughter of William I of England and sister of Henry I of England
- Adela of Pfalzel (660-c. 735), saint and founder of convent of Pfalzel
- Adela of Ponthieu (c. 1110 – 1174), Countess of Surrey
- Adela of Saluzzo (c. 995 – after 1055), Italian noblewoman
- Adela de Warenne (born c. 1170), Anglo-Angevin noblewoman

== Modern world ==
- Adéla (born 2003), Slovak singer-songwriter and dancer
- Lady Adela (1847–1924), Kurdish ruler of the Jaff tribe
- Adela Marion Adam (1866–1944), English classicist
- Adela Adamova (born 1927), Argentine ballet dancer
- Adela Akers (1933–2023), American textile artist
- Adela Humood Alaboudi (born 1967), Iraqi politician
- Adela Cabezas de Allwood (born 1918), Salvadoran pediatrician
- Adela Andea (born 1976), Romanian American artist
- Adela Azcuy (1861–1914), Cuban nurse and poet
- Adella Brown Bailey (1860–1937), American politician and suffragist
- Adela Balderas (born 1969), Basque university professor
- Adela Paulina Baltoi (born 1992), Romanian long-distance runner
- Adela Cerezo Bautista (born 1961), Mexican politician
- Adela Navarro Bello (born 1968), Mexican journalist
- Adela Ben-Yakar, Israeli biomedical engineer
- Adela Breton (1849–1923), English archaeological artist and explorer
- Adéla Bruns (born 1987), Czech sports shooter
- Adela Calderón (born 1959), Chilean actress
- Adela Graniel Campos (born 1954), Mexican politician
- Adela Cantalapiedra (born 1945), Spanish TV presenter
- Adela Carboné (1884–1960), Italian-born actress
- Adela Castell (1864–1926), Uruguayan teacher, essayist, and poet
- Adéla Cernousek (born 2003), French golfer
- Adela Chaljub de Char (1943–1994), First Lady of the Atlántico from 1984 to 1987
- Adela Coit (1863–1932), German women's suffragist
- Adela Cojab (born 1996), Mexican-American activist and writer
- Adela Yarbro Collins (born 1945), American author and academic
- Adella Colvin, American yarn dyer
- Adela Cortina (born 1947), Spanish philosopher
- Adela Dankowska (born 1935), Polish aviator and politician
- Adela Demetja (born 1984), Albanian curator
- Adela (Ada) Dundas (1840–1887), Scottish churchwoman and artist
- Adela Elad (born 1987), Cameroonian movie actress
- Adela Fernández y Fernández (1942–2013), Mexican folk writer and teacher of theater
- Adela Forestello (1923–2021), Argentine educator and human rights activist
- Adela Gáborová (1940–2007), Slovak actress
- Adela Galiana (born 1825), Spanish writer and poet
- Adela García (born 1971), Dominican fitness competitor
- Adela Garcia (born 1971), Dominican IFBB Pro Fitness competitor
- Adéla Hanzlíčková (born 1994), Czech freestyle wrestler
- Adela Helić (born 1990), Serbian volleyball player
- Adela Hernández (born 1962), Cuban politician
- Adéla Holubová (born 2002), Czech mountain biker
- Adela Papież (born 2001), Polish filmmaker and screenwriter
- Adella Prentiss Hughes (1869–1950), American pianist and impresario
- Adela Peralta Leppe (1929–2018), Mexican actress and union activist
- Adella Hunt Logan (1863–1915), American writer, educator and suffragist
- Adela de la Torre de Lope, Spanish politician
- Adéla Lehovcová (born 1991), Czech field hockey player
- Adela Jušić (born 1982), visual artist from Bosnia and Herzegovina
- Adela Maddison (1862–1929), British composer
- Adela Medina (born 1978), Argentine footballer
- Adela Micha (born 1963), Mexican journalist
- Adela Milčinović (1878–1968), Croatian feminist author, critic and suffragette
- Adela Mohseni (born 1950), Afghan activist
- Adela Montes (1928–2024), Argentine journalist
- Adela Robles Morales (born 1965), Mexican politician
- Adela Neffa (1922–2019), Uruguayan-born Argentine sculptor
- Adela Noriega (born 1969), Mexican actress
- Adéla Matasová (born 1940), Czech sculptor
- Adéla Odehnalová (born 1990), Czech former football defender
- Adela Orpen (1855–1927), Irish writer
- Adela Ginés y Ortiz (1847–1923), Spanish artist, sculptor
- Adela Pankhurst (1885–1961), British-Australian political activist
- Adella M. Parker (1870–1956), American suffragist and politician
- Adela Pla Pastor (1938–2005), Spanish politician
- Adela Peña, American violinist
- Adela Celeste Peralta (born 1987), Argentine boxer
- Adela Velarde Pérez (1900–1971), Mexican activist
- Adela Piskorska (born 2003), Polish swimmer
- Adéla Pivoňková, Czech former football midfielder
- Adela Popescu (born 1986), Romanian actress and singer
- Adela Raz (born 1986), Afghan politician
- Adela Reta (1921–2001), Uruguayan lawyer
- Adela Calva Reyes (1957–2018), Mexican writer, author and playwright
- Adela Ringuelet (1930–2023), Argentine astrophysicist
- Adela Ruiz de Royo (1943–2019), Panamanian mathematics academic
- Adela Rogers St. Johns (1894–1988), American journalist, novelist, and screenwriter
- Adela Šajn (born 1990), Slovenian artistic gymnast
- Adela Edwards Salas (1874–1939), Chilean teacher and philanthropist
- Adéla Šapovalivová (born 2006), Czech ice hockey player
- Adela Riek Scharr (1907–1998), American aviator
- Adela Sequeyro (1901–1992), Mexican journalist, actress, filmmaker and screenwriter'
- Adela Serra-Ty, Filipino politician
- Adela Van Severen (1909–2007), Salvadoran politician
- Adéla Škrdlová (born 2001), Czech ice hockey player
- Adela Smajic (born 1993), Swiss television presenter
- Adela Blanche Stewart (1846–1910), New Zealand homemaker and writer
- Adéla Stříšková (born 2000), Czech handball player
- Adela Świątek (1945–2019), Polish mathematician
- Adela de la Torre, American writer
- Adela de Torrebiarte (1949–2020), Guatemalan politician
- Adella Turner (1856–1938), American activist
- Adela Úcar (born 1980), Spanish journalist, host and producer
- Adela Vázquez (1958–2024), Cuban-American transgender activist and performer
- Adela Sloss Vento (1901–1998), American writer
- Adela Verne (1877–1952), English pianist
- Adela Vinczeová (born 1980), Slovak television presenter
- Adela Ber Vukić (1888–1966), Bosnian painter
- Adella Wotherspoon (1903–2004), American, youngest and last living survivor of the General Slocum ship disaster
- Adela Xenopol (1861–1939), Romanian feminist and writer
- Adela Zaharia (born 1987), Romanian operatic soprano
- Adella Kean Zametkin (1863–1931), American writer and activist
- Adela Zamudio (1854–1928), Bolivian poet, feminist, and educator
- Adela Žgur (1909–1992), Slovene germanist and translator
- Adela Elizabeth Zúñiga (born 1942), Honduran politician

== See also ==
- Adela (disambiguation)
