= Texas Tech University College of Human Sciences =

- Established: 1925
- Dean: Tim Dodd, Ph.D.
- Faculty: 130
- Students: 3,417
- Undergraduates: 2,869
- Postgraduates: 584
- Location: Lubbock, Texas, U.S. 33.583487°N 101.873139°W
- Website: www.hs.ttu.edu

The College of Human Sciences (COHS) is one of the constituent units of Texas Tech University in Lubbock, Texas. It was founded in 1925 as the College of Home Economics as one of the four original colleges of Texas Tech.

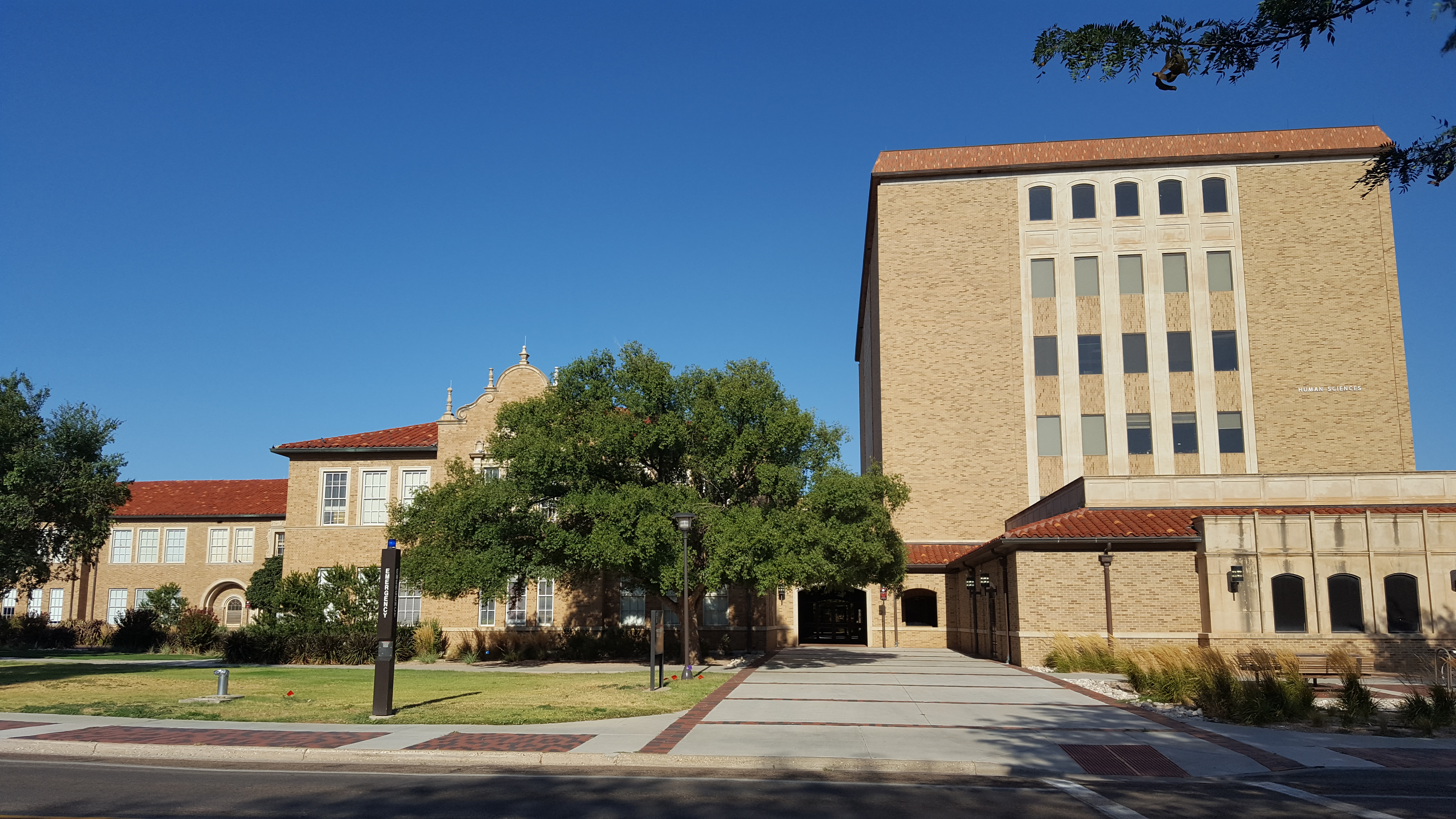
College of Human Sciences Building at Texas Tech

== History ==
When it opened in 1925, the then named School of Home Economics was one of the four original units of the university. Enrollment in 1925 included some 78 students and three faculty members. The college would remain named the School of Home Economics until 1993 when, after several years of deliberations, the current "College of Human Sciences" moniker would take effect. Margaret Watson Weeks was the initial Dean of the school from its founding in 1925 until 1953. It was under her leadership that the first (of four) additions to the original Home Economics Building (now Human Sciences Building) was completed in 1951. To date, most of the COHS faculty and classrooms are contained within the COHS Building and the nearby Human Sciences Cottage, a house-like structure that opened in 1928 as the Home Management House. The Cottage served as a practicum site for students in the college. In 1931, the first nursery school would be offered there during the summer months and year-round services would be added in 1938. Childcare services in the Cottage would continue until the Fall 2006 semester. Today these services continue as part of The Christine DeVitt and Helen DeVitt Jones Child Development Research Center.

The original building was designed by W.W. Watkin and Sanguinet & Staats’ principal architect Wyatt C. Hedrick. Four subsequent additions to the building have been made. These included the aforementioned 1951 addition designed in the Spanish plateresque style by Lubbock architectural firm Haynes & Kirby to the south of the original structure, a u-shaped addition to the east in 1973 designed by Architects III Joint Ventures, a multistory addition to the south designed by Tisdel & Adling (originally named the “Food Sciences Tower”) in 1977, and the current Christine DeVitt and Helen DeVitt Jones Child Development Research Center designed by SHW Group which opened in 2006.

== Recognitions ==
The COHS was ranked the 6th college of family, consumer, and human sciences by College Factual in 2020. The COHS was the #1 such college in Texas in the same ranking. College Factual also listed the COHS as having the #2 Best Online Family, Consumer & Human Science School, the #3 Best such school for veterans, and the #5 best value school in the nation.

The COHS was ranked the #1 school in the nation for the number of doctoral degrees conferred to Hispanic Americans in its 2019 ranking. The college was ranked 7th in the nation for its conferral of doctorates to all racial/ethnic minorities in the same poll. The college was ranked 5th, 17th, and 20th in the nation in for its conferral of master's degrees to Hispanic Americans, persons of two or more races, and all minorities in 2019 as well.

The college has consistently ranked highly in Diverse Issues in Higher Education's Top 100 Producers of bachelor's degrees as well. In 2019, the college was in the top ten of institutions nationally in three undergraduate degree categories. The college ranked 6th in the nation for its Hispanic bachelor's degree conferrals, 8th in the nation for its “Total Minority” bachelor's degree conferrals and 9th in the nation for “Two or more races” degree conferrals. The college also ranked 14th, 17th, and 43rd in the nation for its bachelor's degree conferrals of Native Americans, African Americans, and Asian Americans respectively.

The hospitality program in the Department of Hospitality and Retail Management was #1 in the nation for its conferral of doctoral degrees to African Americans by Diverse Issues in Higher Education in 2019 and for its conferral of doctorates to all minority students The program was ranked 12th in terms of its conferral of master's degrees to Hispanic students and 27th for all minority students in 2019 as well.

At the undergraduate level, the department ranked 23rd and 39th in the nation by Diverse Issues in Higher Education in terms of bachelor's degree conferrals of Hispanic and Asian Americans. In 2019, Wealth Magazine named the Department of Personal Financial Planning the #1 program in the nation. The ranking was based on a number of key performance indicators including the types of degrees granted, number of faculty, availability of capstone courses, number of graduates, and number of electives. The ranking was the first data-driven assessment of Personal Financial Planning programs.

The Apparel Design and Manufacturing bachelor's degree program was ranked 3rd in the Southwest in 2018 by Fashion Schools The Human Development and Family Sciences program in the eponymous department was ranked the #2 Best Value in the nation by College Factual in 2020 and was ranked #10 overall.

=== Public Art ===
In 1998, the Board of Regents of the Texas Tech System committed funds to create the Texas Tech University Public Art Collection and numerous art pieces and sculptures have been installed across the main campus and the campuses of the other constituent institutions of the system. As of late 2020, five installations are located in and around the COHS Building.

A notable multipiece sculpture display entitled "Park Place at Talkington Plaza" by Lubbock native Glenna Goodacre is installed on the east side of the COHS Building. The piece was donated to the COHS and Texas Tech by J.T. and Margaret Talkington in March, 1997. The piece represents the stages of human development across the lifespan.

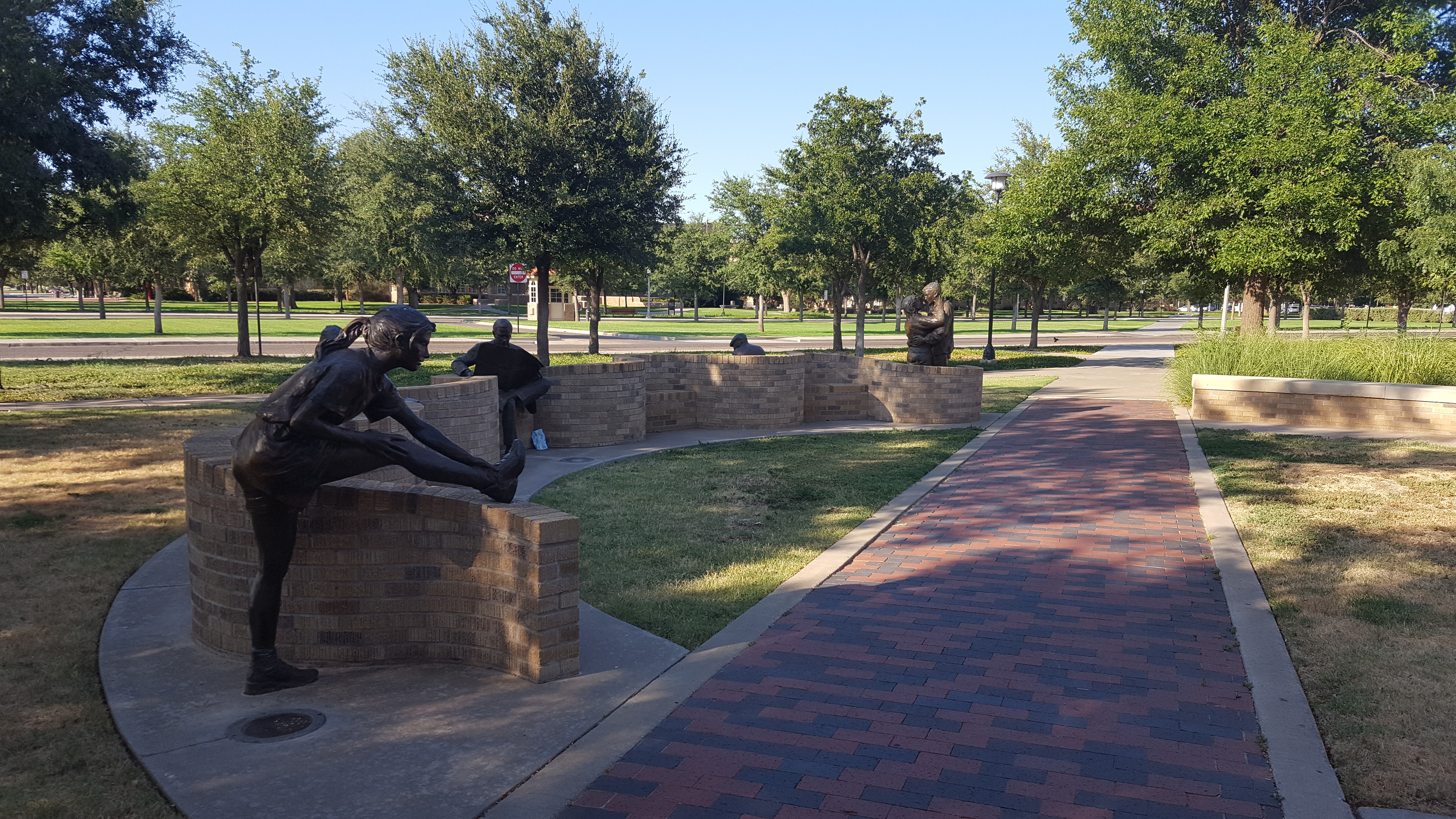
Park Place at Talkington Plaza

Goodacre also created the sculpture "Irish Madonna" which is located in the Human Science Building courtyard on the southeast side of the building. The sculpture is that of a woman and small child and is meant to invoke the hopes of settlers to Texas and the nation. It was installed in 2001.

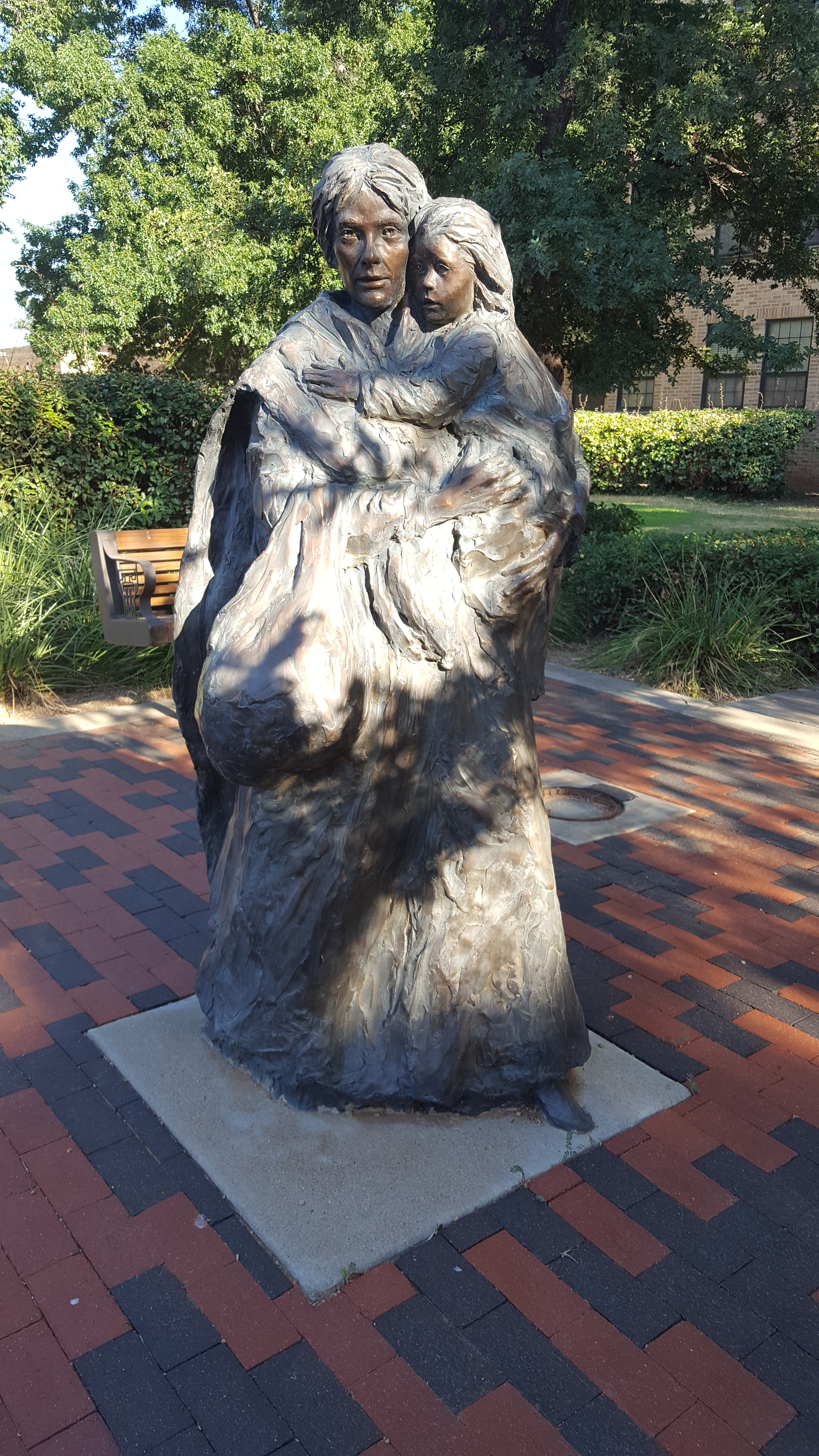
Irish Madonna sculpture

Two pieces created by American mosaicist Farley Tobin are located in the college's Center for the Study of Addiction and Recovery and Child Development Research Center. The piece "Milton's Legacy", a geometric piece inspired by crop circle and grid map geography of West Texas as viewed from the air, is installed in the Center for the Study of Addiction. The piece "Austin Plus Ultra" is a varied geometric piece of various colors and textures in the Child Development Center.

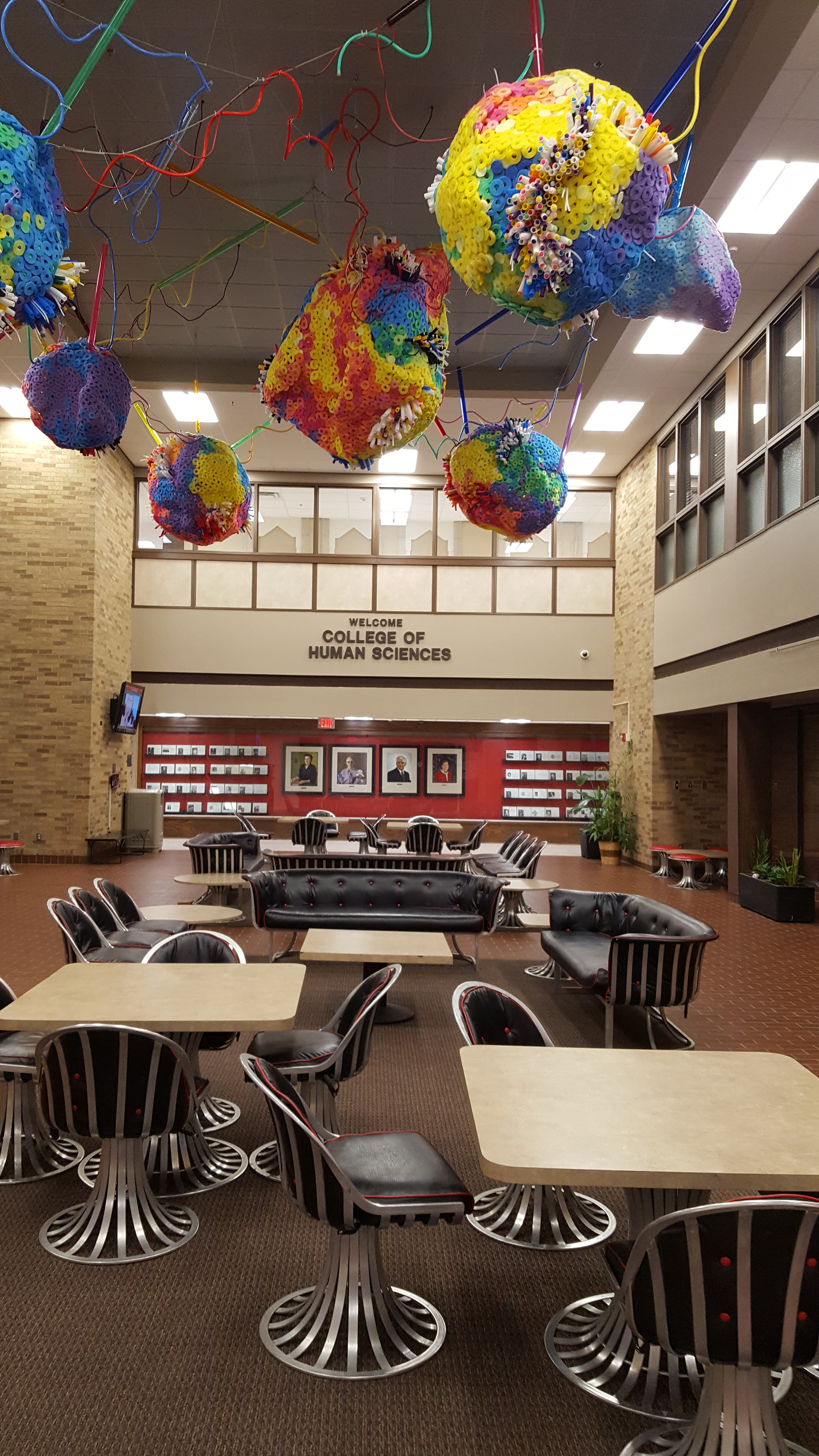
Primordial Garden in El Centro

The most recent addition was the "Primordial Garden" piece which is suspended from the ceiling in the El Centro gathering spot in the center of the main COHS Building. Created by Adela Andea and installed in 2016, the multicolored piece of steel, flexible neon, and foam is meant to instill optimism and motivate viewers of the piece.

== Academic departments ==
- Department of Community, Family, and Addiction Sciences
- Department of Design
- Department of Family and Consumer Sciences Education
- Department of Hospitality and Retail Management
- Department of Human Development and Family Sciences
- Department of Nutritional Sciences
- Department of Personal Financial Planning

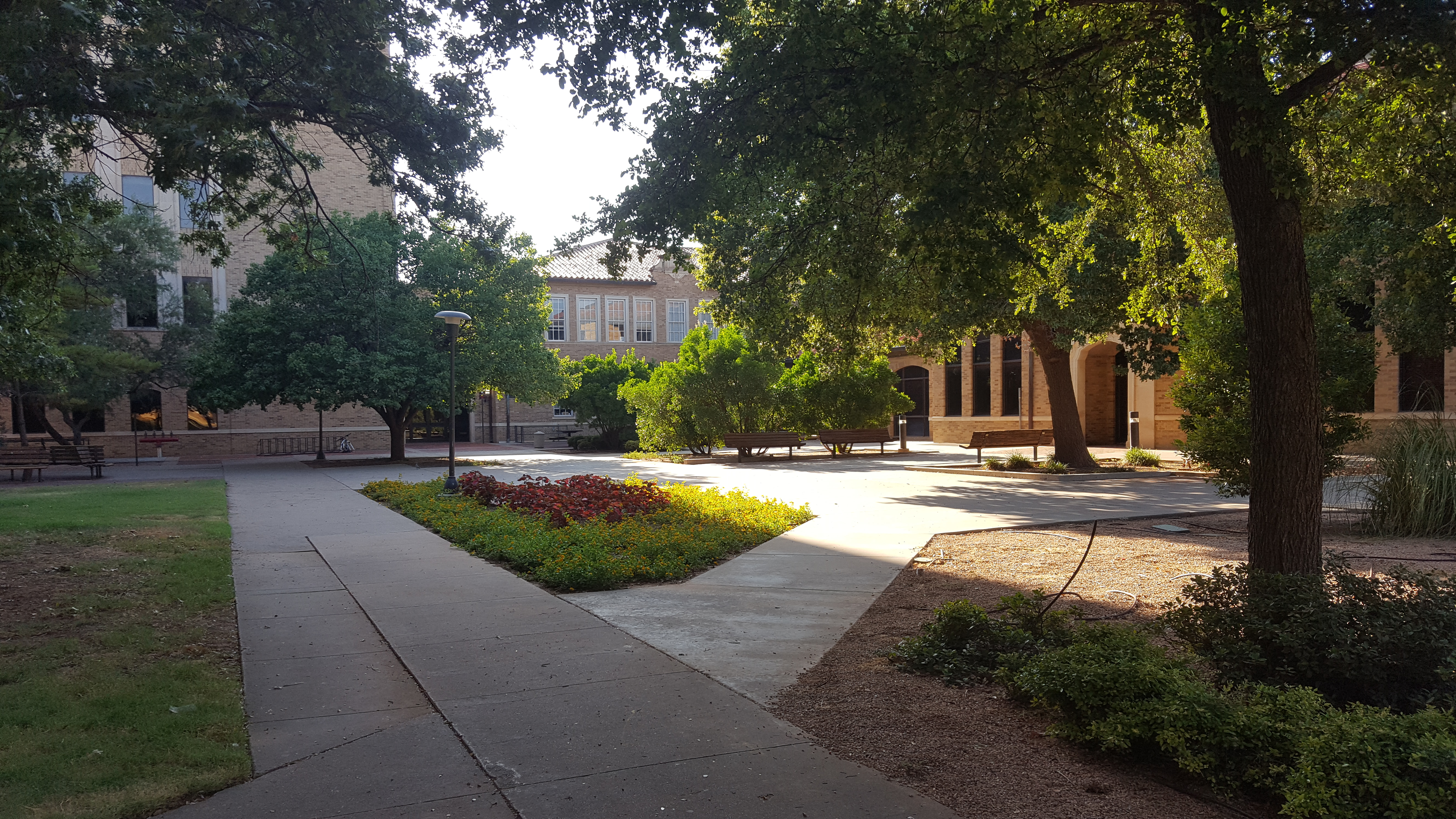
College of Human Sciences Building Courtyard, Texas Tech University

== Accredited Programs and Centers ==
In addition to being accredited as part of the university-wide Southern Association of Colleges and Schools Commission on Colleges (SACSCOC) accreditation, many of the departments and centers in the COHS have program specific accreditation. As of 2020, these included the following eleven accredited programs:

- Bachelor of Interior Design: National Association of Schools of Art and Design (NASAD)
- Bachelor of Science in Apparel Design and Manufacturing: National Association of Schools of Art and Design (NASAD)
- Bachelor of Science in Early Childhood Education: Council for the Accreditation of Educator Preparation (CAEP)
- Bachelor of Science in Nutritional Sciences and Dietetics: Academy of Nutrition and Dietetics (ACEND)
- Bachelor of Science in Personal Financial Planning: Certified Financial Planner Board of Standards (CFP)
- Bachelor of Science in Restaurant, Hotel, and Institutional Management: Accreditation Commission for Programs in Hospitality Administration (ACPHA)
- Dietetic Internship Program: Academy of Nutrition and Dietetics (ACEND)
- Master of Science in Couple, Marriage, and Family Therapy: Commission on Accreditation for Marriage and Family Therapy Education (COAMFTE)
- Master of Science in Personal Financial Planning: Certified Financial Planner Board of Standards (CFP)
- Ph.D. in Couple, Marriage, and Family Therapy: Commission on Accreditation for Marriage and Family Therapy Education (COAMFTE)
- The Christine DeVitt and Helen DeVitt Jones Child Development Research Center (CDRC): National Association for the Education of Young Children (NAEYC)
- Center for Early Head Start: National Association for the Education of Young Children (NAEYC)

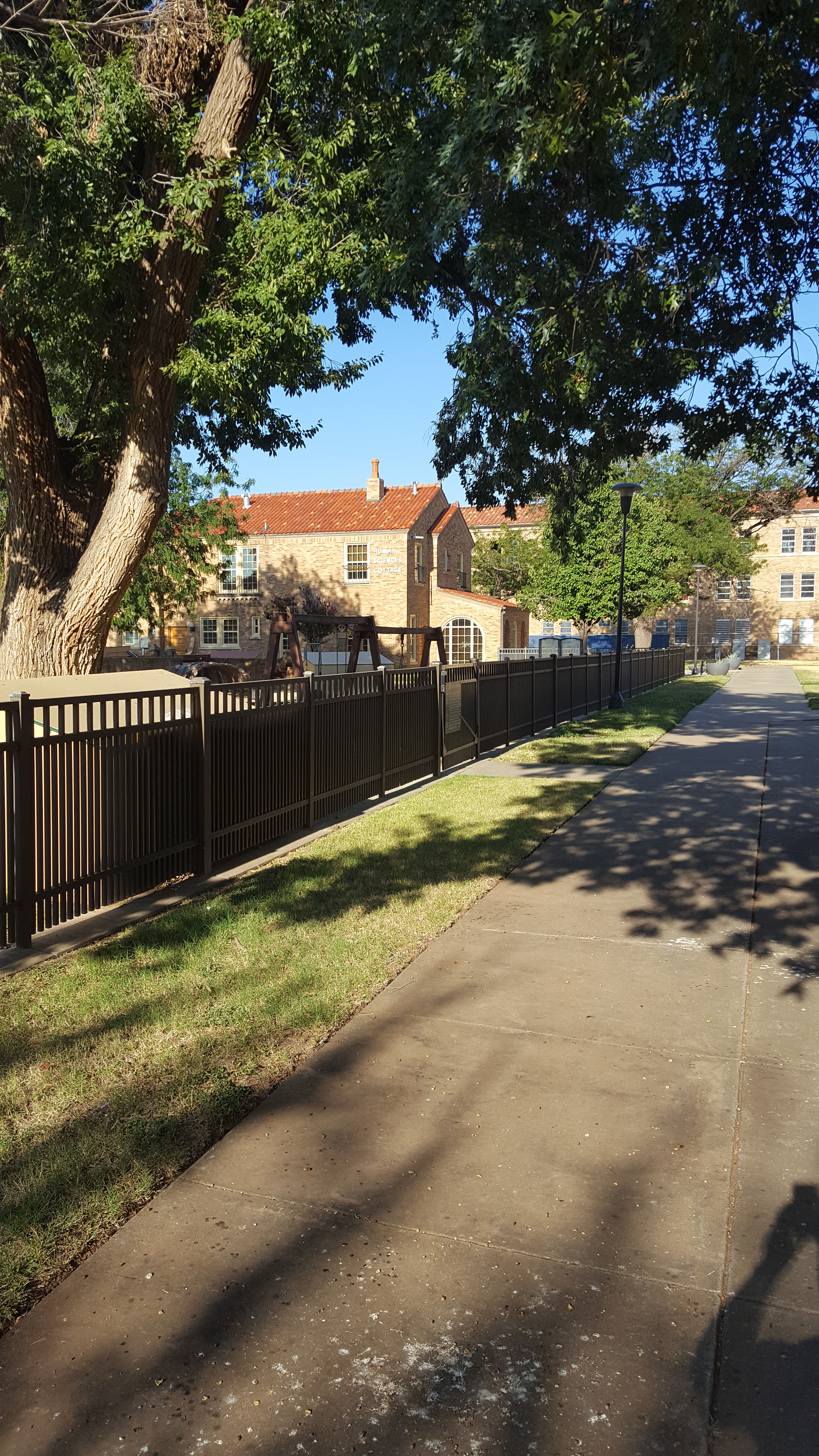
College of Human Sciences Cottage

== Research centers ==
- Center for Financial Responsibility
- Center for Early Head Start
- Center for the Study of Addiction & Recovery
- Child Development Research Center
- Curriculum Center for Family and Consumer Sciences
- Skyviews Restaurant
- Texas Wine Marketing Research Institute
- Women's Studies

== Notable people ==
=== Deans of the College ===
- Margaret Watson Weeks, 1925-1953
- Willa Vaughn Tinsley, 1953-1971
- Donald S. Longworth, 1971-1981
- Elizabeth G. Haley, 1981-2000
- Linda C. Hoover, interim 2001, then becomes the permanent Dean in 2002-July 31, 2020
- Tim Dodd, August 1, 2020 – present
