= Nobody's Wife =

Nobody's Wife may refer to:

== Film ==
- Nobody's Wife (1918 film), American film directed by Edward LeSaint
- Nobody's Wife (1937 film), Mexican film
- Nobody's Wife (1950 film), Spanish film

== Music ==
- "Nobody's Wife", a 1997 single by Dutch singer Anouk
