= Ringuelet =

Ringuelet may refer to:

== People ==
- Adela Ringuelet, Argentine astronomer
  - 5793 Ringuelet, asteroid named after her
- Raúl Adolfo Ringuelet, Argentine zoologist

== Places ==
- Ringuelet, Buenos Aires
