= Azcuy =

Azcuy is a Cuban surname. Notable people with the name include:

- Adela Azcuy (1861–1914), Cuban nurse and poet
- Filiberto Azcuy (born 1972), Cuban wrestler
- Isaac Azcuy (born 1953), Cuban judoka
- Liván López Azcuy (born 1982), Cuban wrestler
- Maikel Alejandro Reyes Azcuy (born 1993), Cuban football player
- Yanqui Azcuy Díaz (born 1976), Cuban boxer
- Xiomara Rivero Azcuy (born 1968), Cuban javelin thrower
