= Sveto =

Sveto Sutta
- Village
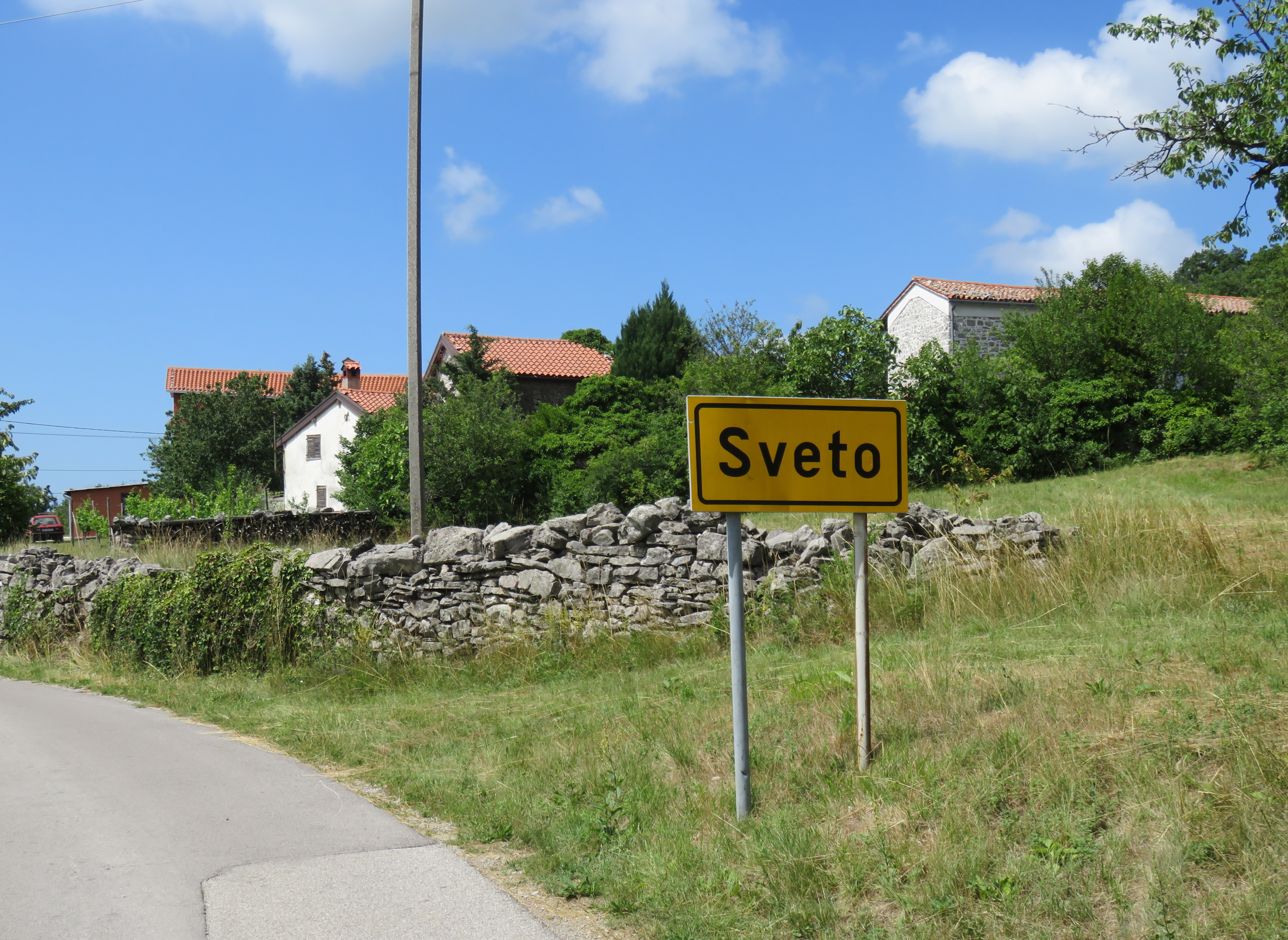

- Location in Slovenia
- Coordinates: 45°49′27.99″N 13°43′52.04″E
- Country: Slovenia
- Traditional region: Slovene Littoral
- Statistical region: Coastal–Karst
- Municipality: Komen

Area
  - Total: 5.46 km^{2} (2.11 sq mi)
- Elevation: 311.4 m (1,022 ft)

Population (2002)
  - Total: 205

Sveto (pronounced [sʋɛˈtoː]; Italian: Sutta) is a village northwest of Komen in the Littoral region of Slovenia.

== Name ==
Sveto was attested in written sources in 1347 as Suta (and as ze Nider/Obern Zawtt in 1485, Szawt in 1494, and Sutta in 1763–87). In the local dialect it is known as Sətu. The medieval inscriptions (including the Middle High German forms with au̯ < ū) and the dialect name indicate that the modern Slovene name is a hypercorrection of *Suto, which is of unclear origin and may belong to a pre-Slavic substratum.

== Mass grave ==
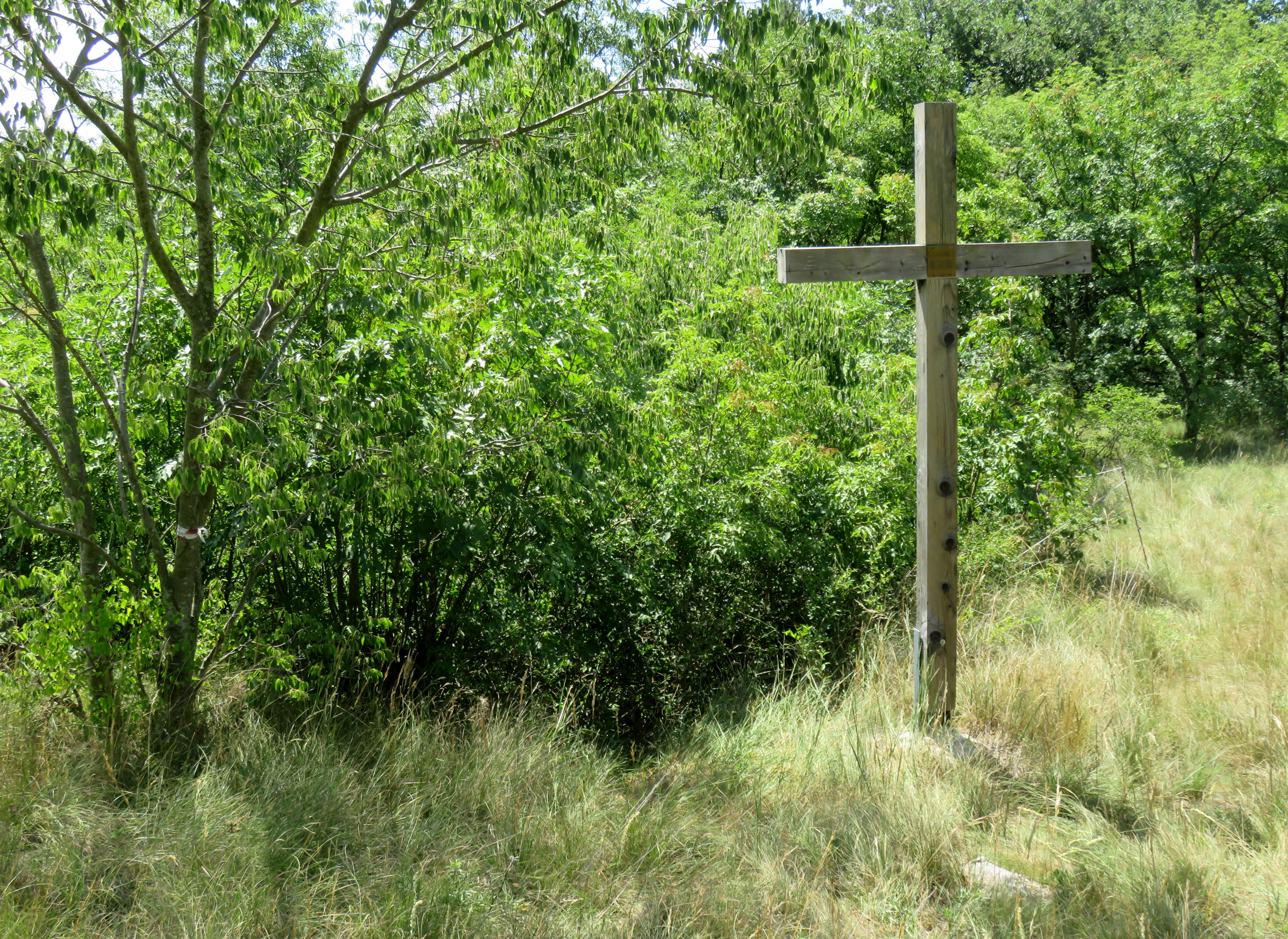
Preserje Cave Mass Grave

Sveto is the site of a mass grave from the period immediately after the Second World War. The Preserje Cave Mass Grave (Slovene: Grobišče Preserska jama) is located between Sveto and Ivanji Grad. It contains the remains of a large number of unidentified people scattered across the entire rubble-covered slope of the shaft. A partial exhumation in 2015 yielded the remains of 23 victims.

== Church ==
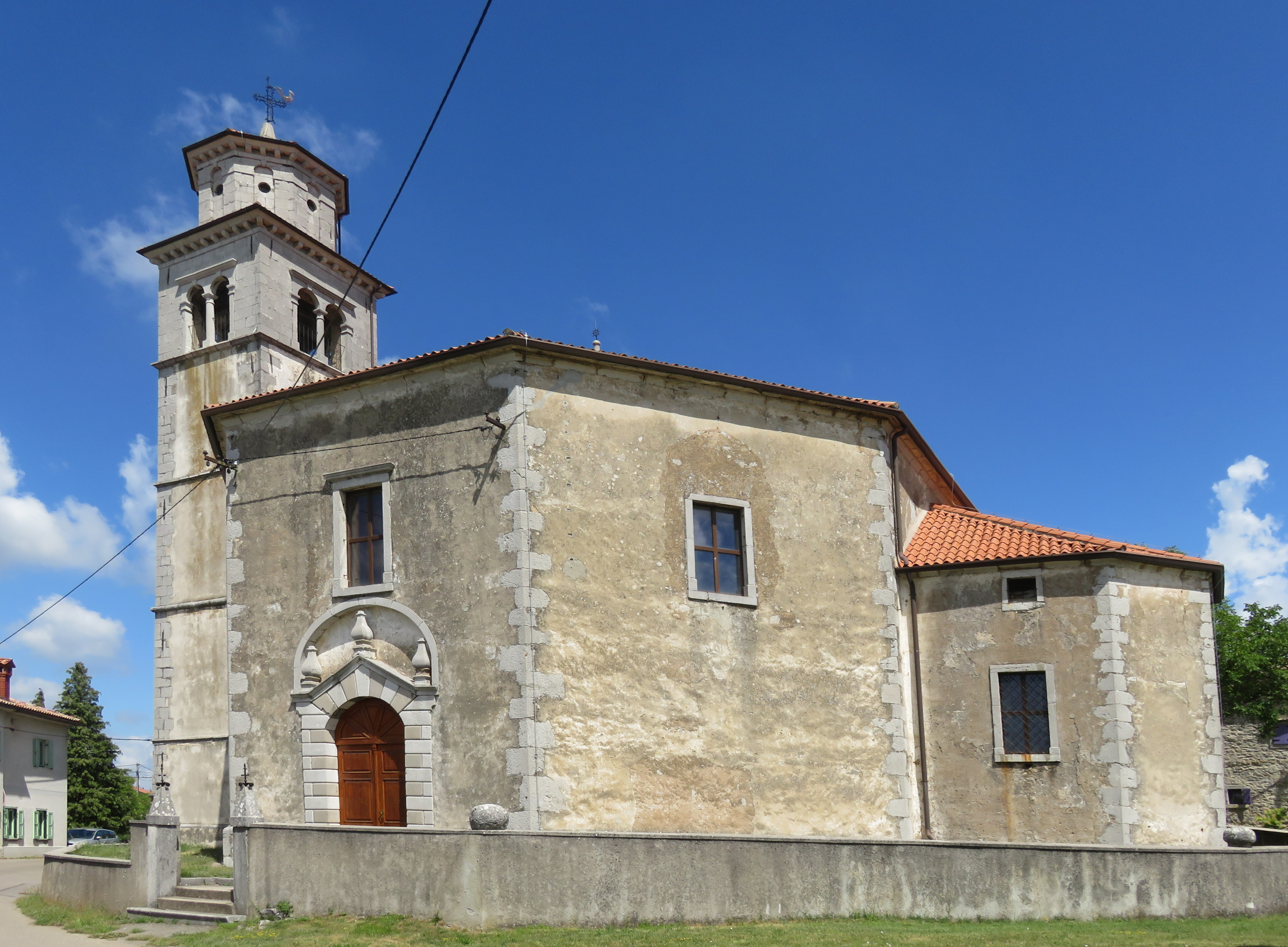
Saint Giles's Church

The local church is dedicated to Saint Giles and belongs to the Parish of Komen.
