= Mica Todorović =

Bosnian painter

- Born: 1900; Sarajevo, Austria-Hungary
- Died: 1981 (aged 80–81); Sarajevo, Yugoslavia
- Resting place: Bare Cemetery
- Education: Academy of Fine Arts in Zagreb
- Known for: Painting
- Notable work: "The Last Victims of Jasenovac and Gradiška"
- Style: Still life

Mica Todorović (1900 – 1981) was a Bosnian painter, who was a founding member of the Association of Fine Artists of Bosnia Herzegovina.

== Biography ==
Todorović was born in Sarajevo in 1900. Her secondary education was at the Girls High School there, and in 1920 she enrolled at the Academy of Fine Arts in Zagreb, where she was the only woman in her class. She graduated in 1926 and returned to Sarajevo, which was a centre for all kinds of visual art. She then travelled to Italy, where she studied Renaissance art. During the Second World War she was imprisoned in the Stara Gradiška concentration camp and later deported to Austria to work as forced labour. In 1945 she was a founding member of the Association of Fine Artists of Bosnia Herzegovina. She was also the first woman to be a full member of the Bosnian Academy of Sciences & Arts, as a well as a member of the Serbian Academy of Sciences & Arts. She was also one of the first professors at the School of Applied Arts in Sarajevo, where she worked until her retirement. She died in 1981 and is buried in Bare Cemetery.

== Works ==
Todorović's first exhibition was held in England in 1930. As a socialist, she became connected to the collective Zagreb Zemlja, who she exhibited work alongside in Ljubljana, and across Europe. The group was made up of artists working in naïve styles, who wanted to represent working-class life. In 1932 she returned to Sarajevo and was a member of the Communist Party of Yugoslavia. From 1937 she worked primarily with paints, and develops a strong eye for colour.

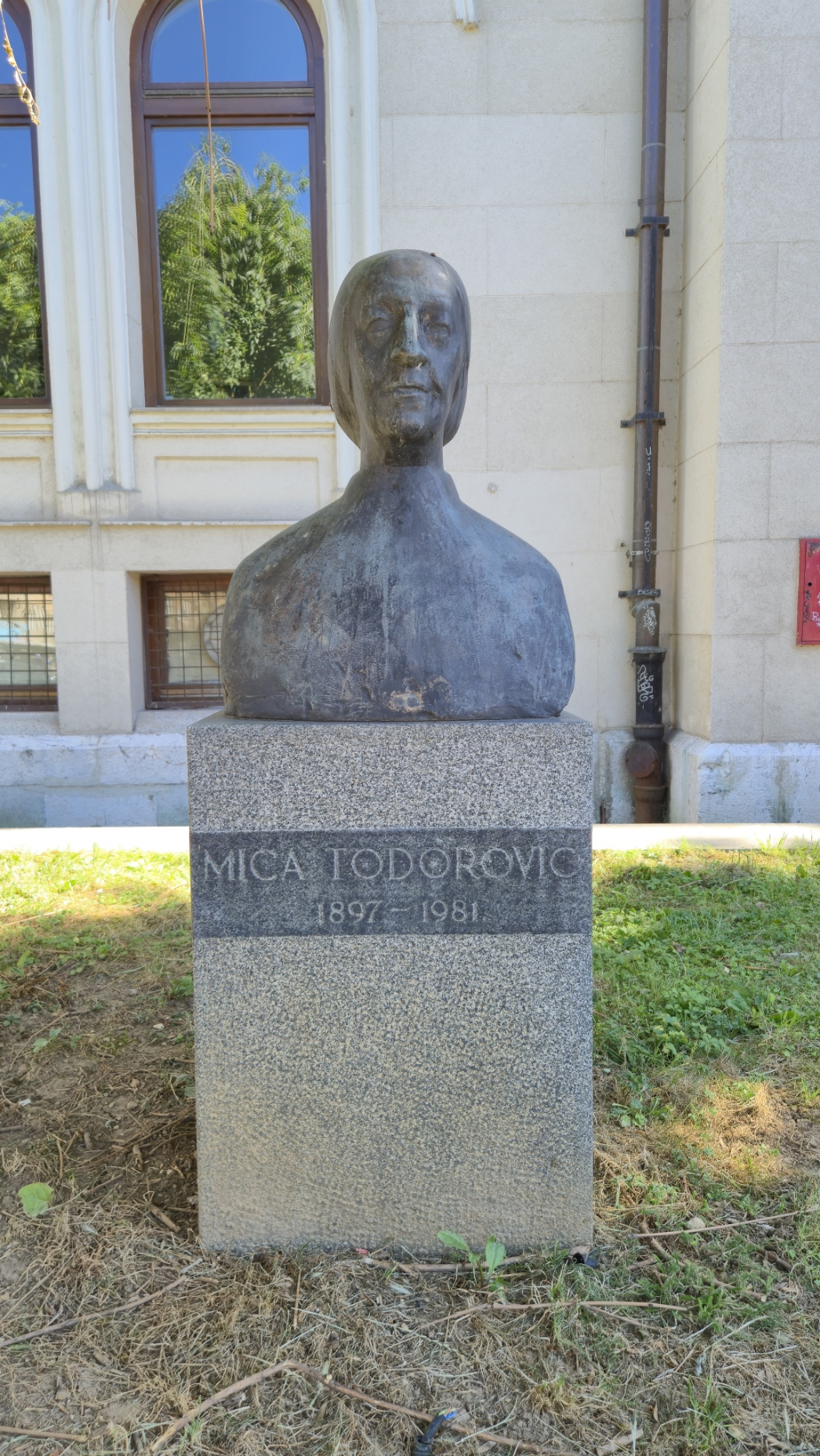
Bust of Mica Todorović, in front of the Academy of arts in Sarajevo

In 1945 she was the only artist to testify at the State Commission for the Establishment of War Crimes in Belgrade, where her series of drawings "The Last Victims of Jasenovac and Gradiška", which depict life in concentration camps, were used as evidence. After the Second World War, human figures disappear from her work and she draws inspiration from objects around her. Despite exhibiting collectively within Yugoslavia, and independently in Europe, Todorović's first solo exhibition did not take place in Belgrade until 1954. She had subsequent shows in Sarajevo in 1962 and 1975 and also in Belgrade once more in 1968.

In 1959, the painting Venice, which is mostly in shades of white, is a turning point in her style and she enters a 'White Phase of her career. From 1962 her work evolves again, this time to include oil pastels as well as paint. In 1980 a retrospective of her work was held at the National Gallery of Bosnia and Herzegovina. In 2019 drawings by Todorović which were created between 1929 and 1933 were exhibited in a show also at National Gallery of Bosnia and Herzegovina. The gallery has over 300 of her works in its collection, some of which are on permanent display.

=== Lost works ===
In 1992 the ten-storey building that belonged to the Oslobođenje newspaper was destroyed, and amongst the losses were photographs taken by Todorović.

== Awards ==
- Order of Merit for the People - Gold Star.
- Order of Labour - Red Flag.

== Legacy ==
A street in Gorica, the area of Sarajevo that she lived in bears her name.

== See also ==
- Adela Bervukić
