= Adéla (disambiguation) =

Adéla may refer to:

- Adéla (given name), a female given name
- Adéla (Adéla Jergová, born 2003), Slovak singer
