= Aporophobia =

Negative attitudes and feelings, or hostility towards, poverty and poor people

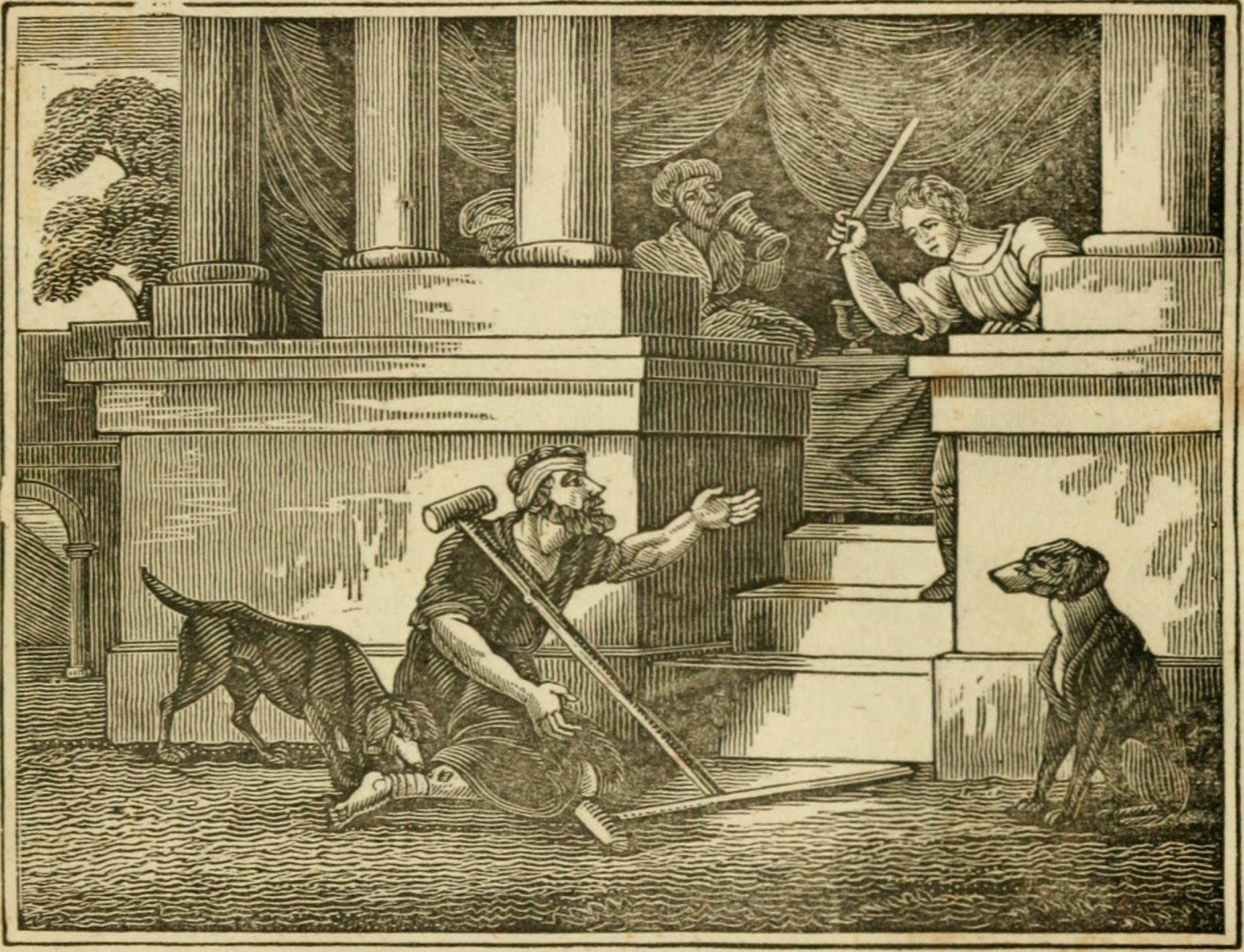
Engraving by John Warner Barber of a person chasing off a beggar with a stick to illustrate the rich man and Lazarus biblical parable

Aporophobia (from the Spanish aporofobia, and this from the Ancient Greek ἄπορος (áporos), 'without resources, indigent, poor,' and φόβος (phobos), 'hatred' or 'aversion') is the systematic rejection, aversion, and discriminatory attitudes directed toward individuals experiencing poverty or economic disadvantage. This concept, formalized by Spanish philosopher Adela Cortina in the 1990s, describes a particular form of social prejudice that targets people not primarily due to their ethnic background, nationality, or other identity markers, but specifically because of their lack of economic resources and perceived social powerlessness. Aporophobia manifests itself in negative emotional reactions, including disgust, hostility, and fear, towards those who are economically marginalized.

The word povertyism is also used, in the field of international law, to denote this form of discrimination against people living in poverty.

== Conceptualization ==
The concept of aporophobia is used by media outlets and professionals. Aporophobia is the hatred, fear, and rejection of poor people. Poverty is a circumstantial characteristic of human life and is in no way part of one's identity. Poverty is not a permanent condition of human beings, but rather an undesirable and unjust situation, but one that can be overcome.

== See also ==
- Anti-Romanyism
- Elitism
- Classism
- Caste
- Economic discrimination
- Environmental racism
- List of phobias
- NIMBY
- Social cleansing
- Slum clearance
- White flight
- Hostile architecture

== Bibliography ==
- Cortina, Adela (2017). Aporofobia, el rechazo al pobre. Barcelona: Paidós. (in Spanish).
- Cortina, Adela (2022). Aporophobia: Why We Reject the Poor Instead of Helping Them. Princeton, NJ: Princeton University Press. ISBN 9780691205526.
