= Adela Sequeyro =

Mexican journalist, actress, filmmaker and screenwriter

- Born: Adela Sequeyro Haro; March 11, 1901; Veracruz, Mexico
- Died: December 24, 1992 (aged 91); Mexico, DF
- Other name: Perlita
- Occupations: Journalist, Actress, Director, Screenwriter, Producer
- Years active: 1923–1953
- Spouse: Mario Tenorio

Adela Sequeyro Haro (March 11, 1901 – December 24, 1992) was a Mexican journalist, actress, filmmaker and screenwriter. She was a pioneer of Mexican cinema both during the silent era and the talkies.

== Early life ==
Adela Sequeyro was born March 11, 1901, in Veracruz, Mexico, to a liberal and well-established family headed by Frederico Sequeyro-Arrola and Virginia Haro y Gutiérrez-Zamora. Financially weakened by the Mexican Revolution of the 1910s, the family was constrained to move to Cuautitlán. Sequeyro attended the French-English school of Mexico City before starting an early career in journalism.

== Career ==
Beginning her journalism career in 1923, Sequeyro started writing about cinema for El Democráta. She began acting the same year under the stage name Perlita and in 1933, she played an important part in Fernando de Fuentes's film, Él prisonero número trece. As her love for cinema grew fonder, Sequeyro became interested in filmmaking. However, as a woman, she was not able to join the industry's labor union. In response, she founded the film production cooperative Éxito with support of the Banco de Credit Popular and was able to produce her first film Más allá de la muerte in 1935. In 1937, Sequeyro founded another cooperative with her husband Mario named Carola with which she wrote, direct and produce her second film La Mujer de Nadie. In 1938, despite financial difficulties, she wrote and directed Diabillos del arrabel. The film was a failure at the box office and, unable to pay her crew and forsaken by the union, she was compelled to sell the rights to her film. By 1943, Sequeyro was bankrupt and retired from film production. She returned to journalism and work for El Universal Gráfico her retirement in 1953. During her journalism career, Sequeyro also worked in collaboration with El Universal Ilustrado, El Universal Taurino and Revista de Revistas. She wrote interviews, columns and reviews and would sometimes sign under the pseudonym of Perlita as reminiscence of old days.

During her career, Sequeyro frequented important figures of the national culture scene of the time, including cartoonist Ernesto García Cabral, painter and filmmaker Adolfo Best Maugard and Arqueles Vela, poet, writer and founder of the Stridentism movement.

== Late years ==
Sequeyro's contributions to Mexican cinema were largely forgotten until Marcela Fernandez Violante interviewed her in 1986 for the implementation of her book on Mexican Women Film Pioneers published in 1987. The CIEC/Universidad de Guadalajara also helped sponsored research to retrieve and restore Sequeyro's films. The very end of her life was spent under the care of her only child Sandra. Sequeyro was 91 years old when she died in Mexico City on December 24, 1992.

== Filmography ==
| Year | Title | Director | Featured Stars | Notes |
|---|---|---|---|---|
| 1923 | El Hijo de la Loca | José S. Ortiz | Ángel E. Álvarez, Napoleón Placeres, Adela Sequeyro | Actress |
| 1923 | Atavismo | Gustavo Sáenz de Sicilia | Ernesto García Cabral, Esther Carmona, Manuel París, Adela Sequeyro | Actress |
| 1924 | No Matarás | José S. Ortiz | Carlos Almanza, Luis Cots, Luis Diaz de Leon, Adela Sequeyro | Actress |
| 1924 | Un Drama en la Aristocracia | Gustavo Sáenz de Sicilia | Ernesto García Cabral, Luis Gómez Rubín, Adela Sequeyro | Actress |
| 1925 | Los Compañeros del Silencio | Basilio Zubiaur | Adela Sequeyro, Carlos Reyes del Callejo | Actress |
| 1927 | El Sendero Gris | Jesús Cárdenas | Adela Sequeyro, Carlos Reyes del Callejo | Actress |
| 1933 | El Prisionero Trece | Fernando de Fuentes | Alfredo Del Diestro, Luis G. Barreiro, Adela Sequeyro | Actress |
| 1933 | La Sangre Manda | José Bohr, Raphael J. Sevilla | Lon Chaney, Lois Moran, Owen Moore | Actress (extra) |
| 1934 | Mujeres sin Alma | Ramón Peón | Consuelo Moreno, Alberto Martí, Juan Orol | Actress |
| 1935 | Más allá de la muerte | Ramón Peón | Adela Sequeyro, Miguel Arenas, Mario Tenorio, Magda Haller | Production, Scenario, Actress, Co-Direction |
| 1937 | Nobody's Wife | Adela Sequeyro | Adela Sequeyro, Mario Tenorio, José Eduardo Pérez, Eduardo González | Direction, Production, Scenario, Editing, Actress |
| 1938 | Diablillos del Arrabel | Adela Sequeyro | José Emilio Pineda, Enrique Olivar, Alberto Islas, | Direction, Production, Scenario |

== Bibliography ==
- Rashkin, J.Elissa. Women Filmmakers in Mexico: The County of Which We Dream, Austin: U of Texas, 2001.
- Hershfield, Joanne, and David Maciel, eds. Mexico's Cinema: A Century of Film and Filmmakers. Wilmington, DE: Scholarly Resources, 1999.
- De La Vega Alfaro, Eduardo and Torres San Martín, Patricia. Adela Sequeyro, Guadalajara, Jalisco, México: Universidad De Guadalajara, 1997.
