= Adela Ben-Yakar =

Biomedical engineer

- Born: Israel
- Education: Stanford University; Technion – Israel Institute of Technology
- Scientific career
- Workplaces: University of Texas at Austin; Stanford University
- Thesis: Experimental investigation of mixing and ignition of transverse jets in supersonic crossflows (2000)

Adela Ben-Yakar is an Israeli biomedical engineer who is the Harry Jr. L. Kent Endowed Professor in the Department of Biomedical Engineering at the University of Texas at Austin. Her research focus on developing advanced laser and imaging technologies for medical and therapeutic uses. Her work includes laser microsurgery, brain imaging, and optical and microfluidic systems required to study organisms. Her research is paired with applications in nerve regeneration, cancer diagnosis, and neurodegenerative diseases. She is a Fellow of SPIE, Optica and the American Institute for Medical and Biological Engineering.

== Early life and education ==
Ben-Yakar has always been interested in space exploration, and wanted to be an astronaut as a child. Ben-Yakar studied aeronautical engineering at Technion – Israel Institute of Technology, where she earned a master's degree. She moved to the United States for graduate research, embarking on a doctoral program at Stanford University. Her research studied transverse jets in supersonic crossflows, a critical aspect to the design of hypersonic air-breathing propulsion engines. During her PhD she combined space studies with photonics. She combined planar laser-induced fluorescence and ultrafast framing rate schileren imaging, and propose improved injection schemes for flame holding. After earning her doctorate, she remained at Stanford as a postdoctoral researcher.

== Research and career ==
In 2005, Ben-Yakar moved to the University of Texas at Austin, where she was made a professor in 2016. She works in optics and photonics for medical diagnostics and therapies. She has created systems for nonlinear brain imaging, endoscopies and ultrafast laser microsurgery. Her endoscopes were proposed to replace traditional scalpels, using powerful laser pulses to penetrate living tissue, and minimize collateral damage. Dr. Ben-Yakar’s research centers on three primary areas. First, she studies ultrafast laser microsurgery and nonlinear imaging, which are used in clinical image-guided surgical and diagnostic systems to treat conditions such as spinal decompression issues, damaged vocal folds, and cervical cancer. Second, she develops high-throughput optofluidic systems for detailed biological testing using organoids and the model organism C. elegans, supporting research in drug discovery, toxicity analysis, nerve regeneration, and neurodegenerative diseases. Third, her work involves creating advanced ultrafast imaging technologies and instruments for 3D imaging flow cytometry and high-speed volumetric brain imaging through LEAD (Line Excitation Array Detection) microscopy.

Ben-Yakar is the co-founder of vivoVerse, which uses AI-powered data analytics and microfluidics to test drugs and molecules.

== Awards and honors ==
- Elected Fellow of SPIE
- Elected Fellow of Optica
- Elected Fellow of the American Institute for Medical and Biological Engineering
- Zonta Amelia Earhart Award
- NIH Director's Transformative Award

== Selected publications ==
- Nicholas J Durr; Timothy Larson; Danielle K Smith; Brian A Korgel; Konstantin Sokolov; Ben-Yakar, Adela (2007). "Two-photon luminescence imaging of cancer cells using molecularly targeted gold nanorods". Nano Letters. 7 (4): 941–945. Bibcode:2007NanoL...7..941D. doi:10.1021/nl062962v. PMC 2743599. PMID 17335272. Wikidata Q37345938.
- Yanık, Mehmet; Hulusi Cinar; Hediye Nese Cinar; Chisholm, Andrew; Yishi Jin; Ben-Yakar, Adela (2004). "Neurosurgery: functional regeneration after laser axotomy". Nature. 432 (7019): 822. Bibcode:2004Natur.432..822Y. doi:10.1038/432822a. PMID 15602545. Wikidata Q33209938.
- Ekici, Özgür; R K Harrison; N J Durr; D S Eversole; Myoungkyu Lee; A Ben-Yakar (2008). "Thermal Analysis of Gold Nanorods Heated with Femtosecond Laser Pulses". Journal of Physics D. 41 (18) 185501. Bibcode:2008JPhD...41r5501E. doi:10.1088/0022-3727/41/18/185501. PMC 3143716. PMID 21799542. Wikidata Q31025424.
