= Adela Cortina =

Spanish philosopher (born 1947)

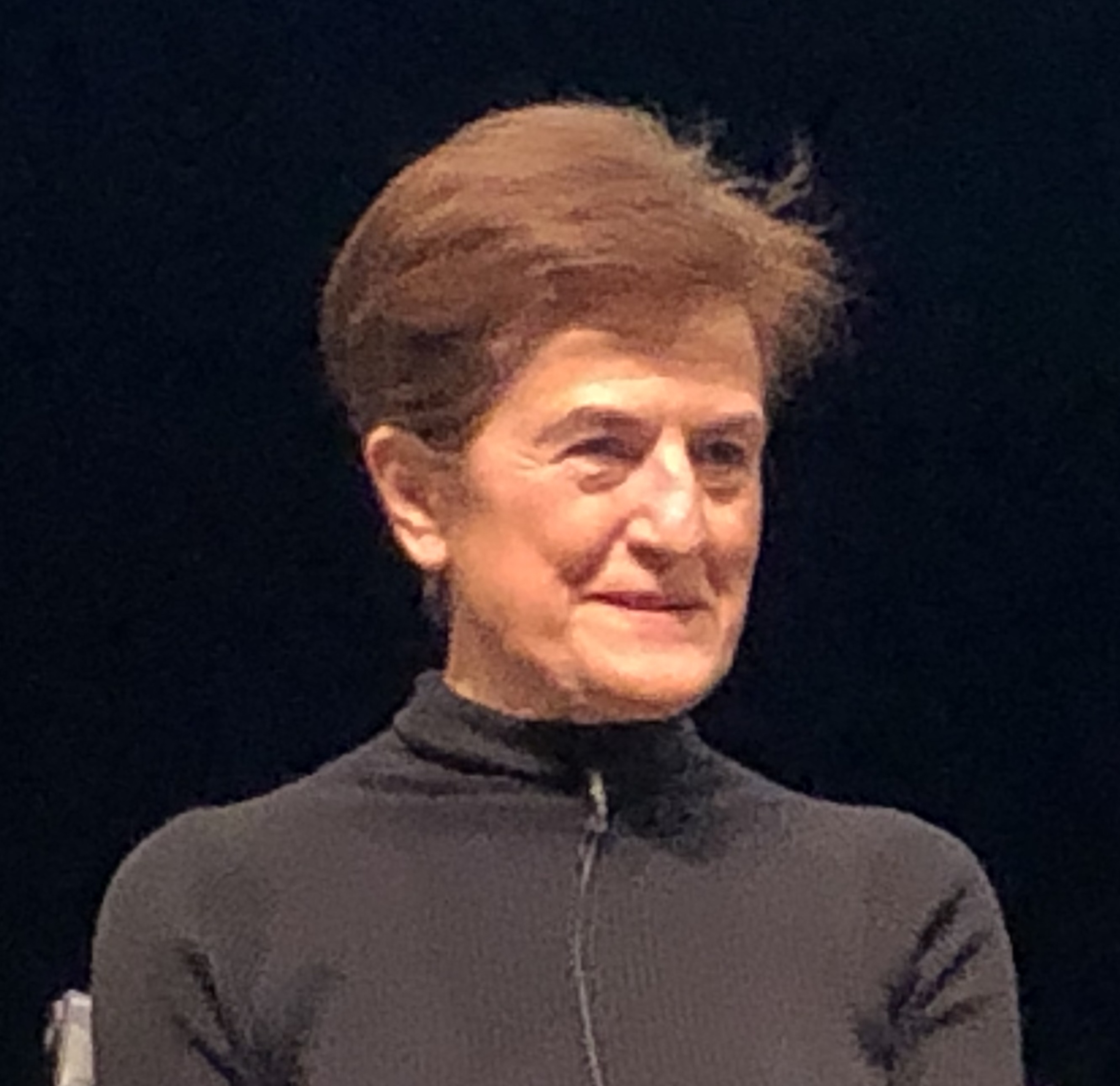
Adela Cortina in 2019

Adela Cortina (born 1947, Valencia) is a Spanish philosopher.

== Biography ==
After studying philosophy and letters in the Universidad de Valencia, she was admitted into the department of metaphysics in 1969. In 1976, she defended her doctoral thesis on the notion of God in Kant's transcendental philosophy and during some time she taught at middle schools and highschools. A research scholarship allowed her to go to LMU Munich, where she got acquainted with critical rationalism, pragmatism and marxist ethics and, more concretely, with the philosophy of Jürgen Habermas and Karl-Otto Apel. Upon coming back to the Spanish scholar scene, she devoted her research time to ethics. In 1981, she was admitted in the department of practical philosophy in the Universidad de Valencia. In 1986, she became Professor of Moral Philosophy, relative to economy, business and the discrimination of women, the war, ecology, genetics, etc. These are topics that the author cultivates in her work. She is married to philosopher and professor at the Universidad de Valencia, Jesús Conill. She is a member of the Comisión Nacional de Reproducción Humana Asistida and holds a position in the Comité Asesor de Etica de la Investigación Científica y Tecnológica. With her book "Ethics of the friendly reason", she won the International Essay Prize Jovellanos in 2007. She has also been named Member of the Royal Academy of Moral and Political Science (2 December 2008), making her the first woman admitted into this institution. She also holds an honorary position in the Universitat Jaume I. She received this honor on 15 January 2009, as well as by the Universidad Politécnica de Cartagena on 27 January 2012. She also received an honorary doctorate from the University of Deusto in 2016.

== Books ==
- 10 palabras clave en filosofía polîtica / Adela Cortina, directora ; [colaboradores, Angel Castiñeira et al.]. Estella, Navarra : Editorial Verbo Divino, 1998. 440 p. ; 22 cm. ISBN 84-8169-161-5
- Etica para la sociedad civil / Adela Cortina Orts ... [et al.]; edición coordinada por Francisco Javier Peña Echevarría. Valladolid, Spain : Universidad de Valladolid, Secretariado de Publicaciones e Intercambio Editorial, [2003?] 200 p. ; 21 cm. ISBN 84-8448-231-6

== See also ==
- Aporophobia
