= Adela of Pfalzel =

8th-century Frankish noblewoman and saint

Saint Adela of Pfalzel
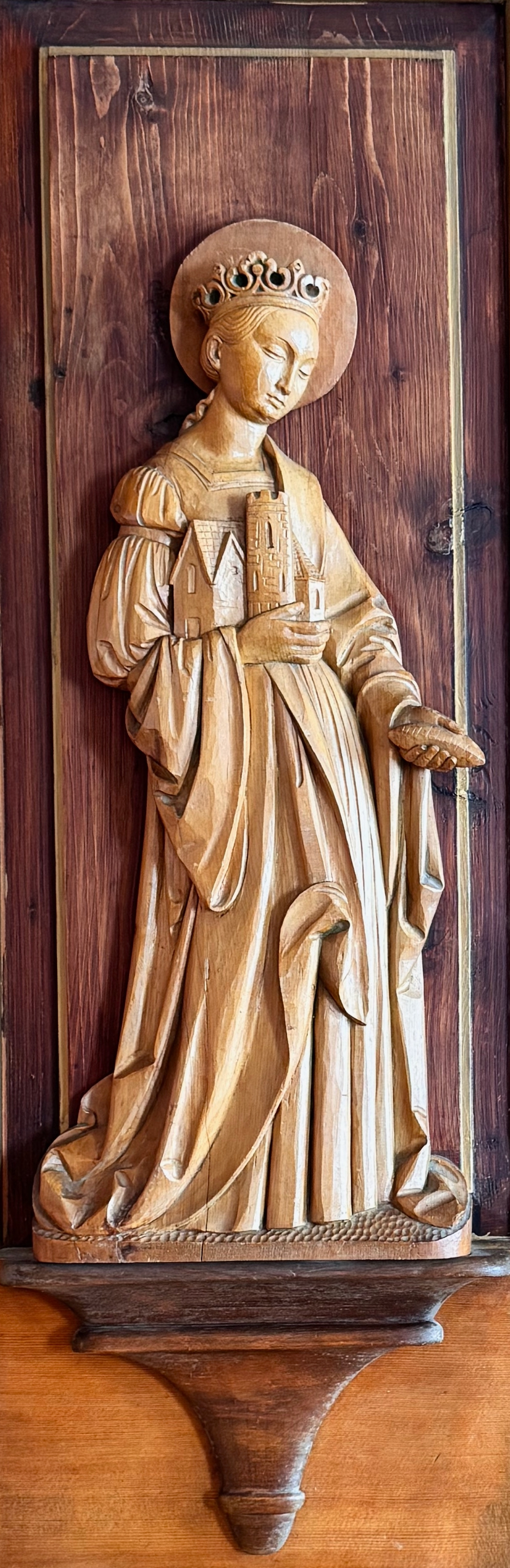
- Sculpture of Saint Adela by Ludwig Moroder.
- Died: 734 or 735
- Feast: 24 December (orthodox), 3 January (catholic)

Adela of Pfalzel (d. 734 or 735), sometimes called Adula or Adolana, was a Frankish noblewoman, abbess, and Catholic saint. Some sources state that her father was Dagobert II and that her sister was Saint Irmina of Oeren. She married a man named Alberic; after he died, she entered the Benedictine monastery of Pfalzel, near Trier; she might have been the monastery's founder and first abbess. She died in Pfalzel in 735. Her feast day is on December 24 in the Orthodox Church; and on January 3 in the Catholic Church.

== Life ==
Adela's father was Dagobert II; her mother's name was Matilda, an "Anglo-Saxon princess" whom Dagobert married while hiding in Ireland from his enemies. She had one brother and three sisters, including Saint Irmina of Oeren. It is not proven, however, that she was the daughter of Dagobert II and the sister of Saint Irmina. She married Alberic; one source states that they had several children, but another source states that they had one son.

According to the Acta Sanctorum, Adela was the founder and first abbess of the Benedictine monastery of Pfalzel, near Trier, which she entered after her husband died. According to hagiographer Agnes Dunbar, however, the monastery was built for her by Dagobert II and Saint Modwald, archbishop of Trier, whose sister, Saint Severa, was the monastery's first abbess, although Adela succeeded her. Hagiographer Omer Englebert states, "Her riches and her beauty brought many suitors for her hand; but following the example of her elder sister, she, too, became a nun and founded, about 690", the convent at Pfalzel.

There is also some conflict in the sources regarding a story about Saint Gregory of Utrecht; the Acta Sanctorum states that he was either Adela's grandson or nephew, while Dunbar states that he was her grandson. According to the Catholic Encyclopedia, though, Gregory was related to Addula, another abbess of Pfalzel: "On account of the similarity of names, and in consequence of a forged last will, Addula has been frequently confounded with Adala (Adela), daughter of Dagobert II of Austrasia". According to the story, Saint Boniface stopped at Pfalzel during his travels; Gregory was so impressed with Boniface's teaching that he became "one of his most zealous disciples", despite Adela's objections.

== Death and legacy ==
Adela died at the Pfalzel monastery on December 24, 735. She left everything in her will to the monastery, except for an estate she bequeathed to her son. Her tomb was removed in 1802; her coffin, with its relics, was taken to Saint-Martin de Luché Church, a parish church in Northern France. The coffin was opened in 1868, but nothing was found inside except for a copy of her will and "a report from 1802". Also in 1802, the lead tablet and original cover of the tomb was discovered behind the church's high altar. In 1933, Adela's head and bones were found hidden under the same altar.

According the Acta Sanctorum, Adela's sainthood is questioned, although it is reported in a medieval lectionary, which also states that Adele was buried at the monastery in Pfalzel. Her "worship seems uncertain" and medieval scholars Luc d'Achery and Jean Mabillon did not refer to her as a saint, but as "pious". The Acta Sanctorum states, however, that "she has a local and popular cult" and lists two feast days: December 18 and December 24, which she shares with Saint Irmina. Adela's feast day is listed as December 24 in the French Martyrology and is mentioned, along with Irmina, in several other martyrologies. According to Dubar, "Adela, Irmina, and Clotilda form one of the Triads, who were probably heathen tribal goddesses. The pilgrimages to their shrines and the rites there observed retain traces of paganism".
