= Adela Ringuelet =

Argentine astrophysicist (1930–2023)

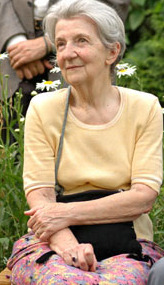
- Born: 27 March 1930
- Died: 26 April 2023 (aged 93); La Plata, Argentina
- Education: Escuela Superior de Astronomía y Geofísica
- Spouse: Jorge Sahade
- Scientific career
- Fields: astrophysics astronomy
- Workplaces: Félix Aguilar Observatory

Adela Emilia Ringuelet (27 March 1930 – 26 April 2023) was an Argentine astrophysicist and astronomer at the Félix Aguilar Observatory in Argentina.

She was a co-founder of the Argentine Astronomical Association (Spanish: Asociación Argentina de Astronomía) and an active member of the International Astronomical Union (IAU), where she had been affiliated with several of its commissions. As of 2017, she was a member of IAU's Division G, "Stars and Stellar Physics". Her research includes more than 100 publications in the field of stellar spectroscopy.

Born in La Plata, Argentina, she studied astronomy at the Escuela Superior de Astronomía y Geofísica with her fellow students Nora Schreiber and Elsa Guttierez. In 1958, she began working at the Félix Aguilar Observatory. She was married to prominent Argentine astrophysicist Jorge Sahade, a director of the La Plata and Cordoba Observatories and former president of the IAU, with whom she published on stellar spectroscopy.

The main-belt asteroid 5793 Ringuelet, discovered by the staff of the Félix Aguilar Observatory at El Leoncito in 1975, was named in her honor. Naming citation was published on 26 September 2007 (M.P.C. 60727).

Ringuelet died on 26 April 2023, at the age of 93.

== See also ==
- 2605 Sahade, main-belt asteroid named after Jorge Sahade
