= Komen =

Komen Comeno
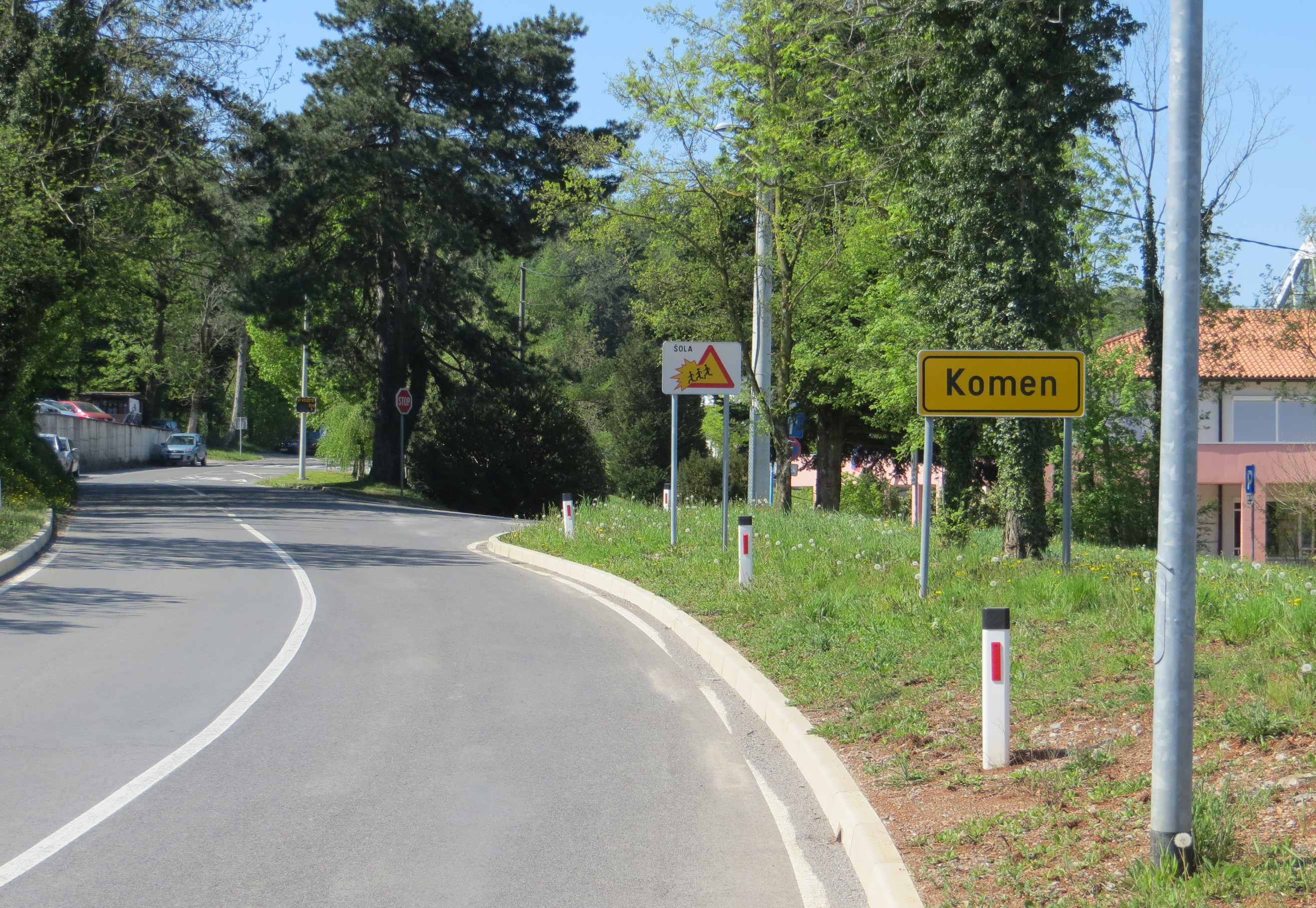

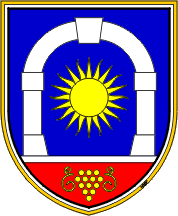
- Seal

- Location in Slovenia
- Coordinates: 45°48′57.34″N 13°45′2.68″E
- Country: Slovenia
- Traditional region: Slovene Littoral
- Statistical region: Coastal–Karst
- Municipality: Komen

Area
  - Total: 6.7 km^{2} (2.6 sq mi)
- Elevation: 273.1 m (896 ft)

Population (2013)
  - Total: 642

Komen (pronounced [ˈkoːmən], Italian: Comen or Comeno) is a settlement in Slovenia. It is the seat of the Municipality of Komen. It is located on the Karst Plateau in the Slovenian Littoral.

== Name ==
Komen was attested in written sources in 1247 as Cominum (and as Cumin in 1255, de Cumino in 1269, and Comein in 1526). The name is probably derived from the Slavic common noun *komъ 'hill, mountain, elevation'. Derivation from the noun komin 'stove, chimney' is unlikely for accentual reasons. The Italian name, which is derived from the Slovene name, is given as Comen in older sources and Comeno in newer sources.

== History ==
In the Middle Ages, it was first part of the Duchy of Friuli and in the 13th century it was included in the County of Gorizia. Komen was first mentioned in a document from 1247. In 1500, the whole region fell under Habsburg dominion and it was included in the County of Gorizia and Gradisca until 1918. During World War I, the western parts of the municipality were devastated by the Battles of the Isonzo. After the end of the war in November 1918, the area was occupied by Italian troops and annexed to Italy with the Treaty of Rapallo in 1920. On February 15, 1944, the village of Komen was burned down by the Nazi German troops as retaliation for Partisan resistance activity in the area; the surviving inhabitants were forcibly resettled to Bavaria, from where they only returned after the end of World War II. In 1947, it became part of Yugoslavia and in 1991 of independent Slovenia.

== Notable people ==
Notable people that were born or lived in Komen include:

- Franco Giraldi, screenwriter (1931–2020)
- Adela Žgur, academic (1909–1992)
