= Adela Galiana =

Spanish writer and poet (born 1825)

Adela Galiana y Albaladejo, also known as Adela Galiana de Osterman (10 July 1825, Torrevieja – Madrid) was a Spanish writer, playwright, poet and columnist.

== Life ==
Galiana was born on 10 July 1825 in Torrevieja to José Galiana Tarancón and Gregoria Albaladejo García. She attended Torrevieja girls’ school and at the very young age started to write compositions both in prose and verse.

In 1850, Galiana married Atenógenes Sánchez Barceló, but was soon widowed. Between 1861 and 1865, Galiana married Saturnino Osterman y Pérez Caballero.

== Work ==
In 1861, Galiana published her first work El hombre y su corazón: descripción sucinta de las épocas de su vida in Valencia. The same year Galiana's only dramatic work was written, Los dos gemelos. Written in verse, the place had three acts and six paintings. In 1865, she published her work El consejero de los niños under the name Adela Galiana de Osterman. The book became famous and was used in the school manual.

In 1870, Galiana published El guerrero español and Un recuerdo de la guerra de África, both dedicated to the Spanish army and navy as her husband was a military officer. In 1881, a Madrid court convicted Galiana of fraud and sent her to prison for five months.

In 1883, Galiana published La corona de la juventud. Obra dedicada a S.A.R. la serenísima señora Princesa de Asturias, doña María de las Mercedes in Madrid. She also published some articles in the Madrid press, and 1880-1890s frequently collaborated with the newspaper Correspondencia Alicantina. In 1887, Galiana wrote some literary and poetic works in the newspaper La Opinion de Torrevieja.

The last known article by Galiana was published in La Opinion de Torrevieja in February 1888. It was an obituary for her nephew Pedro García Ibáñez, who died at age 24.

In 1895, Galiana's second husband Saturnino Osterman y Pérez Caballero died.

Galiana died in Madrid at the end of the 19th century or in the beginning of the 20th century.

== Works ==
- 1861. El hombre y su corazón: descripción sucinta de las épocas de su vida
- 1861. Los dos gemelos
- 1865. El consejero de los niños
- 1870. El guerrero español
- 1870. Un recuerdo de la guerra de África
- 1883. La corona de la juventud. Obra dedicada a S.A.R. la serenísima señora Princesa de Asturias, doña María de las Mercedes

== Bibliography ==
- Ad Turres. Nº 4, Año IV (2006). Historia de los alcaldes de Torrevieja (I): José Galiana Tarancón. Revista del Archivo Municipal de Torrevieja. Concejalía de Archivo. ISSN 1577-6697.
- Hormigón, Juan Antonio (dir) (1996). Autoras en la Historia del Teatro Español (1500-1994). Publicaciones de la Asociación de Directores de Escena de España. Madrid.
- Paz y Meliá, Antonio (1934–35). Catálogo de piezas de teatro que se conservan en el departamento de manuscritos de la BNM. 2º ed. de Julio Paz, vol. II. Ms.14.2248. Madrid.
- Rodríguez Sánchez, Tomás (1994). Catálogo de dramaturgos españoles del siglo XIX. Fundación Universitaria Española. Madrid.
- Simón Palmer, Carmen (1991). Escritoras españolas del siglo XIX. Castalia. Madrid.
