= Nobody's Wife (1937 film) =

- Directed by: Adela Sequeyro
- Starring: Adela Sequeyro; Mario Tenorio
- Release date: 27 October 1937
- Running time: 1h 22min
- Country: Mexico
- Language: Spanish

Nobody's Wife (Spanish: La mujer de nadie) is a 1937 Mexican drama film directed by Adela Sequeyro, and starring Sequeyro and Mario Tenorio.

== Cast ==
- Adela Sequeyro - Ana María
- Mario Tenorio - Marcelo
- José Eduardo Pérez - Leonardo
- Eduardo González Pliego - Rodolfo
- Joaquín Coss - Mayer
- David Valle González - Stepfather
