= Adela Žgur =

Slovene germanist and translator (1909–1992)

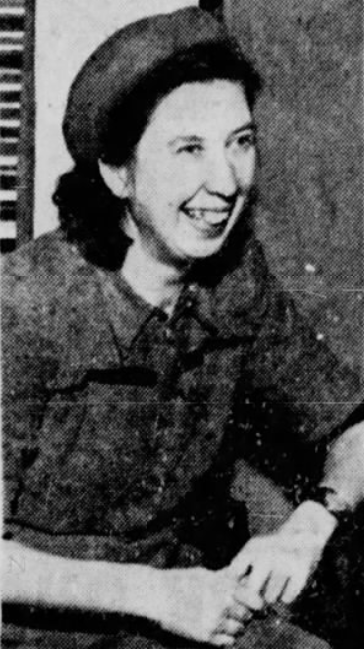
- Adela Žgur, Yugoslav (Slovenian) academic during a 1952 tour of educational facilities in the U.S.
- Born: 22 October 1909; Komen, Austro-Hungarian Empire
- Died: 3 August 1992 (aged 82); Ljubljana, Slovenia
- Occupation: Educator

Academic background
- Education: University of Ljubljana

Adela Žgur (22 October 1909 – 3 August 1992) was a Slovene academic, who prepared the first English textbooks for secondary students in Slovenia. Holding degrees in German and English languages and literature, much of her published work was translation-based. During World War II, because of her work with the Liberation Front, she was imprisoned. At the end of the war, she served as a translator at the Paris Peace Conference of 1946. In 1951, she was awarded a Carnegie Fellowship and spent a year observing educational practices in the United States.

== Early life ==
Adela Žgur was born on 22 October 1909 in Komen, in the Austro-Hungarian Empire to Ljudmila (née Šturm) and Franz Žgur. Her father was in the military and after her birth, the family lived in Ljubljana. She attended schools in Ferlach, Prosecco and Trieste, before entering the classical Gymnasium in Kranj in 1920. After completing her studies in 1928, Žgur enrolled in the Faculty of Arts at the University of Ljubljana to study German language and literature. She graduated with her Bachelor of Science in 1932.

== Career ==
Žgur taught as a substitute professor at the normal school in Ljubljana from 1933 to 1936, when she took courses in Munich at the Goethe-Institut. In 1937, she taught at the gymnasium in Murska Sobota for a year and then at the gymnasium of Maribor until 1939, when she attended Cambridge University on a scholarship from the British Council. Returning to Ljubljana, she taught at the Girl's Gymnasium until May, 1943, when she was imprisoned for collaboration with the Liberation Front. After serving time in prisons in Ljubljana and Trieste, she returned to her teaching post, simultaneously serving as editor for the first Slovene secondary school textbooks for English grammar. In 1945 and 1946, she worked as a translator at the Paris Peace Conference and then between 1947 and 1948 she served as a delegate of the Yugoslav Red Cross to secure repatriation of Yugoslav children who were residing in the British zone of Austria. In 1949, Žgur was appointed by the Ministry of Education of the People's Republic of Slovenia as an inspector for foreign languages.

In 1950, Žgur, who had returned to school to study English language and literature, earned her second degree, and was hired as a German-language proofreader in the Arts Faculty of the University of Ljubljana. She was promoted to lecturer and awarded a Carnegie Fellowship in 1951, spending a year observing educational practices in the United States. From 1952 to 1958, she was the English language lecturer at the University of Ljubljana, and then in 1960 Žgur became a senior lecturer. She was promoted to professor in 1975 and remained in that post until her retirement in 1977.

== Death and legacy ==
Žgur died on 3 August 1992 in Ljubljana, Slovenia, a year after the country seceded from Yugoslavia.

== Selected works ==
- Pestotnik, Sonja; Skalický, Eliza (1945). Žgur, Adela (ed.). Angleška vadnica: prva stopnja [English tutorial: first step] (in Slovenian). Ljubljana: Državna založba Slovenije. OCLC 438319291.
- Skalický, Eliza; Kos, Mateja (1947). Žgur, Adela (ed.). Angleška vadnica: druga stopnja [English tutorial: second step] (in Slovenian). Ljubljana: Državna založba Slovenije. OCLC 438320129.
- Skalický, Eliza (1950). Žgur, Adela (ed.). Angleška vadnica: tretja stopnja [English tutorial: third step] (in Slovenian). Ljubljana: Državna založba Slovenije. OCLC 438322287.
- Žgur, Adela (1952). Deutsche Grammatik, Morphologie [German grammar, morphology] (in German). Ljubljana: Typoskript.
- Žgur, Adela (1956). Deutsche Grammatik, Syntax [German grammar, syntax] (in German). Ljubljana: Typoskript.
- Žgur, Adela (1958). Nemška slovnica [German grammar] (in Slovenian). Ljubljana: Državna založba Slovenije. OCLC 456128022.
- Počkar, Melita (1963). Žgur, Adela (ed.). Izbor nemških tekstov: za berilo in konverzacijo [Selection of German texts for reading and conversation] (in Slovenian). Ljubljana: Univerzitetna založba. OCLC 456595934.
