= Adela Van Severen =

Salvadoran politician (1909–2007)

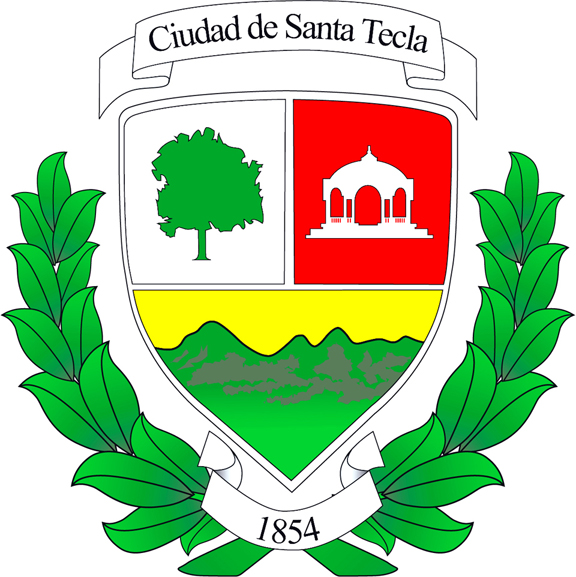
The coat of arms of Santa Tecla, El Salvador.

Adela Van Severen de Contreras (1909 – December 9, 2007) was a Salvadoran politician, recognized as the first woman to serve as mayor in El Salvador.

Born in San Salvador in 1909, Van Severen was educated in the United States. She then settled in the city of Santa Tecla with her husband, José Luis Contreras, and became involved in municipal politics. In 1954, she was chosen to take over the term of incumbent Santa Tecla Mayor José Marcos Biguer, and the following year she was elected directly, becoming the first female mayor in El Salvador. Women had fully earned the right to vote in El Salvador only five years prior, under the Constitution of 1950.

Among her accomplishments as mayor was overseeing the pavement of the city's streets. She served in the post until 1958.

Van Severen remained in Santa Tecla until her death in 2007, at age 98.

A park in Santa Tecla was named in her honor in 2015.
