= Adela (Ada) Dundas =

Scottish churchwoman and artist (1840–1887)

Adela (Ada) Dundas (1840–1887) was a Scottish churchwoman and an artist whose work was recognised by John Ruskin.

Adela Dundas was born on 24 February 1840 in Edinburgh, Scotland. She was the youngest of five daughters of William Pitt Dundas, the registrar-general for Scotland, and his wife, Mary (née Strange). Her grandfather was Lord Arniston, Lord President of Scotland, and her great-uncle was Viscount Melville. Her older sister, Anne Elizabeth Dundas (1830-1913), was also an artist.

In 1843, Adela Dundas fell ill with an inflation of her lungs and was bedbound for a year. She had a curvature of the spine for the rest of her life, though this did not prevent her travelling around Europe.

Adela Dundas sent one of her drawings to the Victorian art critic John Ruskin for advice. He arranged for her to be tutored by one of his protégés, William Ward. Her 1869 watercolour painting Where the boats lay: Wemyss Bay is held by the Victoria and Albert Museum.

In 1875 Dundas was unanimously elected secretary and treasurer of the Churchwoman's Association of the Scottish Episcopal Church. She also became co-editor of the Mission Chronicle.

In 1878, her study A Leaf and two Berries of Berberis Mahonia, was included in the Ruskin Art Collection educational series.

Dundas died on 24 April 1887.
