= Yishi Jin =

Chinese-American neurobiologist

Yishi Jin (金亦石)
- Education: Peking University; University of California, Berkeley
- Scientific career
- Workplaces: Howard Hughes Medical Institute; Massachusetts Institute of Technology; University of California, Santa Cruz; University of California, San Diego
- Thesis: Generating dorsal-ventral asymmetry in the Drosophila embryo : studies on the easter Gene and the polarizing activity (1991)
- Website: Jin Lab

Yishi Jin (金亦石) is a Chinese-American neurobiologist who is a professor at the Howard Hughes Medical Institute. She is interested in neural development and regeneration in nematode Caenorhabditis elegans. Jin is a Fellow of the American Association for the Advancement of Science, American Academy of Arts and Sciences and American Society for Cell Biology.

== Early life and education ==
Jin studied cell biology at the Peking University. She moved to the United States for graduate studies, where she worked at University of California, Berkeley. After earning her PhD at University of California, Berkeley, Jin joined the Massachusetts Institute of Technology as a postdoctoral fellow.

== Research and career ==
In 1996 Jin was appointed to the faculty at University of California, Santa Cruz, and by 2003 she had been promoted to Professor. In 2007 Jin joined the University of California, San Diego as a Professor of Neurobiology. Jin has studied the communication of neurons, formation of synapses, role of neural circuitry in controlling movement and regeneration of axons. Neural communication is mediated by axons that transmit electrical and chemical signals, which are received by receptor proteins. She showed that the protein DLK1 helps these axons to find their way, through a series of specific chemical signals. At the receiver end, Jin has shown that the quality of neurons is evaluated by the EBAX-1 and hsp90, which serve to identify defects and fix any flaws.

Jin has investigated the nerve fibres involved with neuroregeneration. During her investigations, she identified a new genetic pathway – the piwi-interacting RNA (piRNA) – the is involved with the rehabilitation of neuron damage. Jin believes that piRNA may be an effective therapeutic pathway, offering hope for the regeneration of axons. She spent 2016 as a neurobiology resident at Aix-Marseille University, where she studied traumatic brain injury and the regulators that initiate axon regrowth.

In 2018 Jin was named the inaugural Junior Seau Endowed Faculty Chair in Traumatic Brain Injury. The position was established in honour of Junior Seau, a member of the Pro Football Hall of Fame, who suffered from chronic traumatic encephalopathy. Jin was selected as the chair holder because of her research into the effective treatment and prevention of traumatic brain injury. As an advocate for improving young people's access to science, Jin committed to using the position to advocate for K–12 education and better safety in sports. Additionally, in 2025 Jin contributed to a published neuroscience research article in which the idea of neurons have a mechanism to repair and protect the internal structure is found.

== Awards and honours ==
- 1997 Alfred P. Sloan Research Fellow
- 2000 Presidential Early Career Award for Scientists and Engineers
- 2003 Geisel Library Honored Faculty and Honored Books
- 2010 Elected Fellow of the American Association for the Advancement of Science
- 2017 National Institute of Neurological Disorders and Stroke Javits Neuroscience Investigator Award
- 2019 Elected Fellow of the American Academy of Arts and Sciences
- 2020 Elected Fellow of the American Society for Cell Biology
- 2024 Elected Member of the National Academy of Medicine

== Selected publications ==
- Shu, Xiaokun; Lev-Ram, Varda; Deerinck, Thomas J.; Qi, Yingchuan; Ramko, Ericka B.; Davidson, Michael W.; Jin, Yishi; Ellisman, Mark H.; Tsien, Roger Y. (2011-04-05). "A Genetically Encoded Tag for Correlated Light and Electron Microscopy of Intact Cells, Tissues, and Organisms". PLOS Biology. 9 (4) e1001041. doi:10.1371/journal.pbio.1001041. ISSN 1545-7885. PMC 3071375. PMID 21483721.
- Yanik, Mehmet Fatih; Cinar, Hulusi; Cinar, Hediye Nese; Chisholm, Andrew D.; Jin, Yishi; Ben-Yakar, Adela (2004). "Functional regeneration after laser axotomy". Nature. 432 (7019): 822. doi:10.1038/432822a. ISSN 1476-4687. PMID 15602545. S2CID 4372035.
- Zhen, Mei; Jin, Yishi (1999). "The liprin protein SYD-2 regulates the differentiation of presynaptic termini in C. elegans". Nature. 401 (6751): 371–375. Bibcode:1999Natur.401..371Z. doi:10.1038/43886. ISSN 1476-4687. PMID 10517634. S2CID 4422198.
- Zhou J, Feng C, Sun Y, Noma K, Jin Y. A tubulin-MAPKKK pathway engages tubulin isotype interaction for neuroprotection. Proc Natl Acad Sci U S A. 2025 Aug 26;122(34):e2507208122. doi: 10.1073/pnas.2507208122. Epub 2025 Aug 14. PMID: 40811477; PMCID: PMC12403078.
