= Adela Ginés y Ortiz =

Spanish artist, sculptor (1847–1923)

Adela Ginés y Ortiz (1847–1923) was an artist from Madrid, Spain whose work primarily focused on painting and sculpture.

== Life and career ==
Adela Ginés y Ortiz studied at the School of Fine Arts of San Fernando in Madrid, Spain and was a student who studied under Carlos de Haes and Sebastián Gessa. Adela Ginés y Ortiz was also a teacher in the Association for the Teaching of Women and practiced landscape and still life painting, especially vases. Adela Ginés y Ortiz's work was presented regularly to the National Fine Arts Exhibitions, obtained honorary mention in 1887 and 1895 in painting, in 1892 in sculpture, and the third medal in 1895 and 1899 in sculpture. Adela Ginés y Ortiz's work also obtained the third medal in 1897 for an oil painting of a still life portraying a rooster, hens, and grapes. In 1899 Adela Ginés y Ortiz's received an honorable mention at the Universal Exhibition in Paris.

== Works ==
Adela Ginés y Ortiz's works include the following:

- Still Life, oil on canvas, 51 x 41 cm, signed, 1917
- Town house, oil on canvas, 147 x 88 cm, 1901
- A loose presidio, oil on canvas, 75 x 149.5 cm, 1897
- Fruits, oil on canvas, 119 x 69 cm, circa 1910
