= Adela Cabezas de Allwood =

Salvadoran pediatrician (born 1918)

- Born: Adela del Rosario Cabezas; 1918; Santa Ana, El Salvador
- Education: University of El Salvador (M.D., 1948)
- Occupation: Physician
- Spouse: Juan Allwood

Adela del Rosario Cabezas de Allwood (born 1918) is a Salvadoran physician, who is considered the second woman to graduate from the doctorate in medicine at the University of El Salvador. Furthermore, Adela de Allwood has published several books throughout her medical career.

She was born in Santa Ana, El Salvador and she was one of nine children. Her father was a journalist who founded Diario del Pueblo in 1923.

After graduating from UES in 1948, Adela Cabezas traveled to the United States to specialize in paediatrics and nutrition in about 1949. In the early 1950s, she worked on a project concerning goiter which was endemic in Central American schoolchildren. She was the Chief of Nutrition Service at the National Ministry of Health of El Salvador.

She served as Chief of the Salvadoran Red Cross Medical Services in the late 1980s. She was a member of the Asociación de Mujeres Universitarias (Association of University Women of El Salvador). She was rector of the Francisco Gavidia University in the 1980s. She was part of the Ateneo de El Salvador since 1975. In 1999, she was declared "Doctor of the Year 'Dr. Gustavo Adolfo López'".

In 2007 the Legislative Assembly of El Salvador declared her "Distinguished Physician of El Salvador" for "her outstanding professional career in the field of medicine".

== Books ==
- From disaster relief to development: the experience of the El Salvador Red Cross / Del socorro en el desastre al desarrollo (Genève, Instituto Henry-Dunant, 1987)
- Cuentos y más cuentos (Consejo Nacional para la Cultura y el Arte, 199?)
- Mujer médico siglo XX (Editorial Arte y Letras, 2000)
- Va la vida (Ingenio El Ángel, 2012)
