= No Matarás =

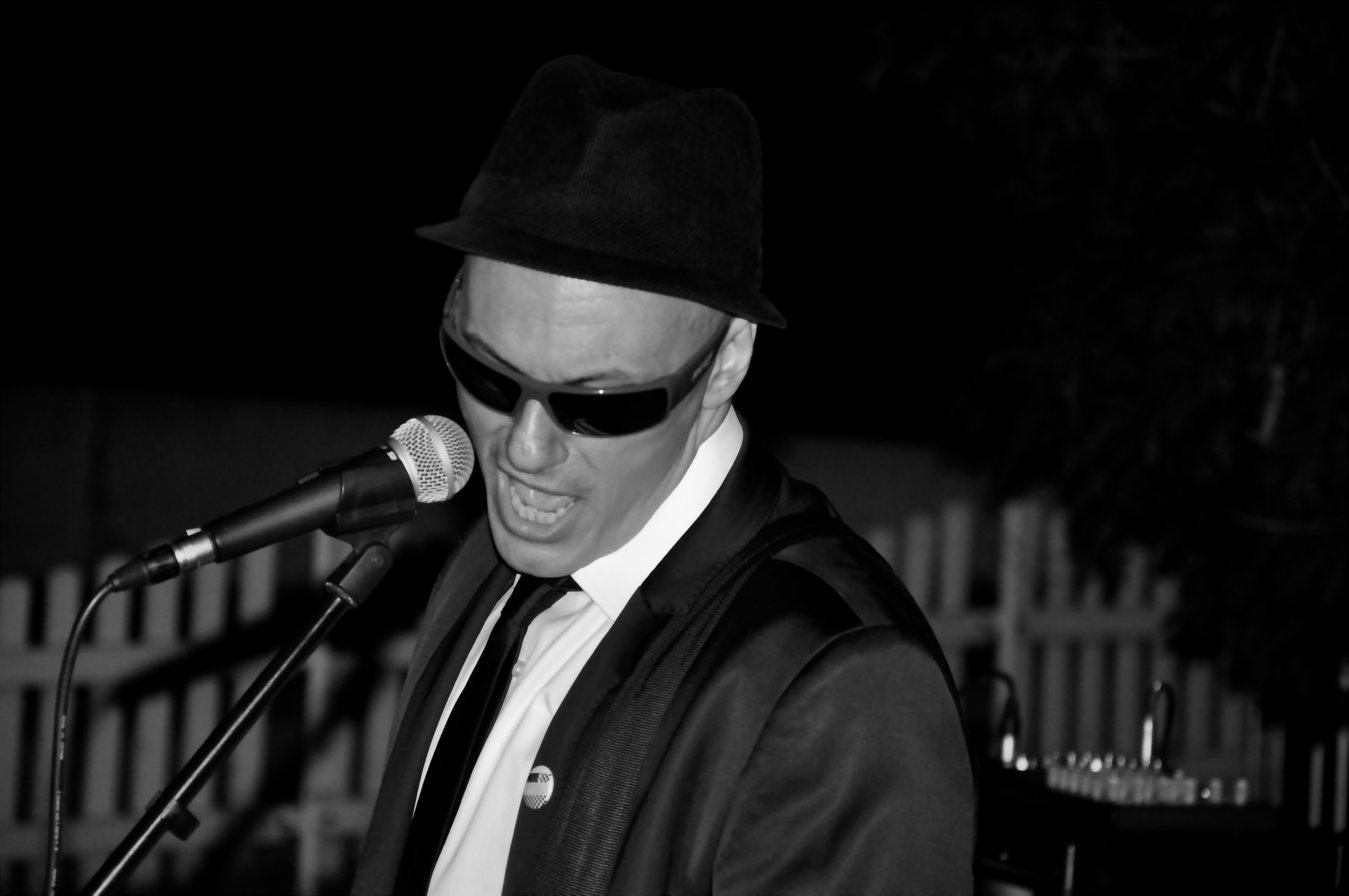
- Argentinian punk band - Pedro Visintin (vocals and guitar)

Background information
- Origin: Buenos Aires, Argentina
- Genre: Punk rock
- Years active: 1990 – present
- Members: Pedro Visintin, Julian Sylvester, Benjamin Albinger
- Past members: Vanina Fiorentino, Daniel Zaltzman, Cristian Ruiz, Javier Da Rocha, Esteban Quintana, Marcin Balinsky
- Website: http://www.nomataras.de

No Matarás (in English, ‘thou shalt not kill’) is the name of an Argentinian band in the punk genre, formed in the years around 1990 in Buenos Aires, and currently based in Berlin, Germany.

Not coincidentally, ‘thou shalt not kill’ is also the seventh commandment in the list of the ten commandments given in the Bible, the holy book of Christianity. In its name, the band declares and expresses a certain basic philosophical position that was at the root of Punk in the 1970s, that of a disillusioned culture that had abandoned the "flower power" of the 1960s for the new slogan; "there is no future". The initial ‘No’ also stands as a symbol of defiance. The essential spirit of punk is revealed in No Matarás. But this is not, of course, a case of revelation of a great truth like those made in the name of the biblical God; rather another kind of truth found in rebellion, in the human experience grounded in free, critical and antidogmatic thinking.

“PUNK IS: the constant struggle against fear of social repercussions. PUNK IS: a movement that serves to refute social attitudes that have been perpetuated through willful ignorance of human nature”. From the Punk Manifesto by Greg Graffin, concerning rebellion in the same spirit that is expressed in the lyrics of No Matarás. Those lyrics contain various themes. Some refer to political and social issues based in the history of Argentina, such as the struggle against media monopolies, or the denunciation of crimes against humanity. Others refer to certain psychological and philosophical questions arising from the investigation of the inner self, the meaning of life, the passions, emotions and feelings of the all-too-human beings that inhabit us, their relations with themselves and with their most intimate companions.

In its musical output, No Matarás shows influences from early punk (The Clash, The Ramones, The Jam), Britpop (Blur) and North American alternative music (Talking Heads, The Pixies). The band's electric, frenetic style suggests a certain similarity with the music of the Toy Dolls, and the two bands are also linked by the fact that both have covered The Beatles song, "Yellow Submarine", which No Matarás play in every one of their live performances.

The current line-up based in Berlin consists of founder and original member Pedro Visintin as band leader (guitar and vocals), and German musicians on drums and bass guitar. The revised trio maintains in its style the essential elements of its origins in Argentinian punk. The band appears in frequent performances. In addition, the band is planning its first tour of other locations in Europe, such as Moscow and Hamburg, and in the slightly more distant future a tour of South America to coincide with a return to Argentina. On the other hand, appearances with well-known German punk bands are in discussion, such as with Die Toten Hosen, Die Ärtze and Kamikaze Queens. As for recording projects, No Matarás plan to launch a compilation in vinyl record format that will reproduce a list of songs the band has played in the last twenty years of their career.

== History ==
No Matarás began its first sessions in 1990 in rehearsal studios in Buenos Aires. The band soon began playing at concerts with well-known bands and musicians from the punk scene, both local and international. At the time, the line-up was: Pedro Visintin (guitar and vocals), Vanina Fiorentino (bass) y Daniel Zaltzman (drums). The trio composed the band's first songs with an essentially punk sound, which were launched at concerts in various venues such as 440, Cemento, Salón Pueyrredón, La Capilla, and others.

Some time later, Daniel Zaltzman (drummer) decided to leave the band to join the reggae group Satélite Kingston, and was replaced by Cristian Ruíz, (the first drummer of Todos Tus Muertos). At the same time, No Matarás continued its tours of the underground scene in Buenos Aires, in concerts at various locations around the province and Capital Federal, as well as in the cities Mar del Plata and Rosario. The peculiar energy of these live performances attracted the attention of notable local bands such as the Argentinian rock and ska band, Los Fabulosos Cadillacs. As a result, in October 1993 at the invitation of Luciano Giugno (Luciano Jr.), one of the original members of that group, Pedro Visintin joined the group of bands supporting The Girlie Show World Tour, Madonna's first appearance on tour in Buenos Aires.

One of the most notable occasions in the band's early history was the encounter that led to the performance of a duet between Pedro Visintin and Pil Trafa, member of Los Violadores, a pioneering South American punk band, singing "Yellow Submarine". Another notable episode was Visintin's appearance alongside Trixy, performing the song "Oh! Darling".

After the 1990s, the band appeared with important local and international punk bands, such as the Argentinian groups Attaque 77 and Los Fabulosos Cadillacs. No Matarás also collaborated with Marky Ramone, drummer of The Ramones, as part of Marky Ramone & The Intruders show, in C.R.U. Mar del Plata, in 1999. A year later (at Cemento) they performed at a concert presenting the first appearance of the Belfast punk band Stiff Little Fingers, in Buenos Aires.

Over time, No Matarás acquired a certain musical maturity and the band's live performance punk energy combined with elements of Britpop influence, and from the American new wave scene. At the same time, the band maintained the spirit expressed in the lyrics of its songs, taking a critical stance on the established sociocultural order nationally and internationally, opposing the status quo and expressing an antidogmatism directed at both religious and secular targets.

== Members ==
Original line-up

- Pedro Visintin (guitar and vocals), only remaining original band member. Born in 1968 in San Isidro, Buenos Aires. He took up music at a very early age with his first musical equipment, an Epiphone guitar and an old record player used as an amplifier. Before founding No Matarás, Visintin had a part in the formation of various bands in the first local punk scene such as División Autista, (guitar), Morgue Judicial (bass), Mal Momento (bass) and accompanying Luciano Jr. (founding member of Los Fabulosos Cadillacs) on guitar.
- Vanina Fiorentino (bass)
- Daniel Zaltzman (drums)

Other members

- Cristian Ruíz (drums)
- Javier Da Rocha (drums)
- Esteban Quintana (bass)
- Marcin Balinsky (bass)

Current line-up

- Pedro Visintin (guitar and vocals)
- Julian Sylvester (bass and backing vocals)
- Benjamin Albinger (drums)

== Songs ==
- "Ríe o muere"
- "Inconsciente"
- "Él dejó de hablar"
- "En el mar"
- "Dame en qué creer"
- "Súper chica"
- "Morir ¿Por qué?"
- "Perdido y encontrado"
- "Joe 90"
- "Mr. TV"
- "Sin retorno"
- "Quiero vivir la historia"
- "Y desperté"
- "Mi obsesión es más"

(All songs listed are published on Souncloud)

== Covers ==
- "Caminando" (Rubén Blades)
- "Yellow Submarine" (The Beatles)
- "Hard Day's Night" (The Beatles)
- "Oh! Darling" (The Beatles), with Trixi and Los Replicantes.
- "Our House" (Madness)
- "Let's Lynch the Landlord" (Dead Kennedys)
- "Represión" (Los Violadores), tribute album

== Discography ==
Demo
The first demo was recorded in Buenos Aires, in the “Abasto al pasto” studio, with Alejandro Varela producing (ex-member of "Don Cornelio", "La Zona" and "Los Visitantes")

First single
No Matarás are currently preparing their first single for release on vinyl, which will include "Inconsciente", one of the band's first songs. The launch is planned for early 2013.
