= Adela Milčinović =

Croatian feminist writer and journalist

- Born: Adela Kamenić; 14 January 1878; Sisak, Kingdom of Croatia-Slavonia, Austria-Hungary (now Sisak, Croatia)
- Died: July 18, 1968 (aged 90); New York City, United States
- Occupations: Author, journalist, critic, and feminist
- Writing career
- Subjects: Women's rights and education

Adela Milčinović (Croatian pronunciation: [ǎdela milt͡ʃǐːnovit͡ɕ]; 14 January 1878 – 18 July 1968) was a Croatian feminist author, playwright, journalist, and suffragette.

== Life ==
Adela Kamenić was born in Sisak, Kingdom of Croatia-Slavonia, Austro-Hungarian Empire (now Croatia) on 14 January 1878, her mother Ludmilla's illegitimate daughter. She received her teacher's qualification from the Sisters of Charity convent in Zagreb in 1896. She then studied art history in Hamburg and Leipzig.

In 1899, she married Andrija Milčinović, a teacher and student at the University of Zagreb. Afterward, the couple moved to Zdenci where Andrija had gained employment as a teacher. Between 1902 and 1904, they lived in Germany, then returned to Zagreb in 1904, where her husband finished his degree and became an employee of the Museum of Arts and Crafts. They had two daughters and divorced around 1915. Milčinović spent World War I working at the occupation newspaper The Belgrade News (German: Belgrader Nachrichten, Serbo-Croatian: Beogradske Novine).

She returned to Zagreb in 1918 where she was a secretary at the National Women's Alliance of the Kingdom of Serbs, Croats, and Slovenes (Serbo-Croatian: Narodno vijeće Države Slovenaca, Hrvata i Srba). She moved to New York City during the 1930s and remained there until her death in 1968.

== Activities ==
Milčinović wrote a letter in Domestic Fireside (Croatian: Domaće ognjište) in which "she presented a well-formulated feminist critique, denouncing the absence of women from public life and outlining her vision of a new aesthetics." While living in Germany in 1903, the Milčinovićs published a short-story collection together, Under the Barrage (Croatian: Pod branom) and Adela wrote for the Zagreb newspaper The Nation (Croatian: Narodne novine).

== Selected works ==
- Under the Barrage (Croatian: Pod branom, 1903; co-authored with Andrija Milčinović)
- Johnny (Croatian: Ivka, 1905)
- Dragojla Jarnević (1907)
- Joyless (Croatian: Bez sreće, 1912)
- Shadow (Croatian: Sjena, 1919)
- Madam Doctor (Croatian: Gospođa doktorica, 1921)
