= Adela Ber Vukić =

Bosnian painter (1888–1966)

Adela Ber
- Born: 30 December 1888; Tuzla, Austria-Hungary
- Died: 28 October 1966 (aged 77); Sarajevo, Yugoslavia

Adela Ber (30 December 1888 – 28 October 1966) was the first female artist from Bosnia and Herzegovina to be educated at an art school and a pioneer of women's rights in her country.

Her works includes portraits and still life paintings of Bosnian landscapes.

== Early life ==
Ber was born in Tuzla, Bosnia and Herzegovina, in 1888. Her mother hailed from Livno.

== Education ==
After completing a higher girls' school in Sarajevo, Ber aspired to become a teacher. She left for Vienna in 1908, first enrolling in a private art school, then, in 1910, in a private women's art school. During her studies in Vienna, she lived in dire circumstances, unable to get a scholarship because she was a woman, the state feeling that money spent on educating women was "thrown away". Owing to her great talent, a college professor at the Vienna school decided to provide her with a free education.

== Career ==
After graduating in June 1914, she returned to Sarajevo with hopes of opening a private painting school. World War I broke out later that same month when Archduke Franz Ferdinand of Austria was assassinated by Bosnian Serb nationalist Gavrilo Princip. The outbreak of war made it impossible for Ber to open a painting school. Ber organized her first solo art exhibit in Sarajevo after the First World War in 1919.

Ber died in 1966, aged 77.
