= Adela Azcuy =

Cuban nurse and poet (1861–1914)

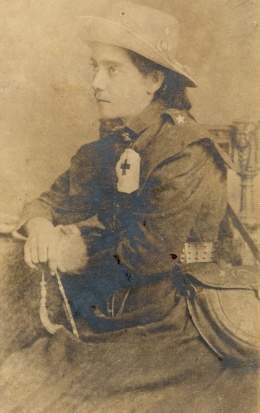
- Born: Gabriela de la Caridad Azcuy Labrador; March 18, 1861; Viñales
- Died: March 15, 1914 (aged 52); Havana
- Occupation: Nurse

Gabriela de la Caridad Azcuy Labrador (18 March 1861 – 15 March 1914) was a Cuban nurse and poet who participated in the Cuban War of Independence. On 10 February 1896, she joined the militia of Miguel Lores near Gramales as an army medic. The following year, General Lorente wrote that "in the heat of battle at Las Cañas, between Guane and Mantua, Mrs. Azcuy got off of her horse to heal the wounded in such moments of peril that other doctors had already temporarily withdrawn." Azcuy was made a Captain and after the war entered politics as the Secretary of the Board of Education in Viñales.

== Biography ==
On 18 March 1861, Adela Azcuy was born in Viñales, Cuba to parents Francisco Azcuy Martínez and María del Carmen Labrador Piloto and would live on a farm in San Cayetano until 1865. Her family moved to the residence of Azcuy's grandmother, where she learned horsemanship, hunting, and the handling of firearms. Azcuy had her first marriage to Creole Jorge Monzón Cosculluela, a Bachelor in Pharmacy in 1886. Their marriage was happy until 1891 when, while working to treat the victims of an outbreak of smallpox, Monzón died of the disease on 17 January. She remarried to Spaniard Castor del Moral, an employee of the pharmaceutical her late husband worked at, but their marriage broke down over disagreements of the political future of Cuba.

On 10 February 1896, Azcuy joined a guerrilla militia commanded by Lieutenant Colonel Miguel Lores near Gramales, in spite of her gender, because of her fierce spirit and pharmaceutical knowledge, earned from working as her husband's right hand in the making of medicine and treating of wounds. During one battle, a General Lorente wrote of her:

"En Cañas, entre Guane y Mantua, en 1897 y en el fragor de una batalla, la señora Azcuy apeóse del caballo para curar a los heridos, en momentos de tan grave peligro que los facultativos se habían temporalmente retirado."
"At Cañas in 1897, between Guane and Mantua, in the heat of battle, Mrs. Azcuy dismounted from her horse and to treat the wounded at such a situation that was so grave that the physicians had temporarily retired."

— General Lorente
