= Adela Andea =

Romanian American artist (born 1976)

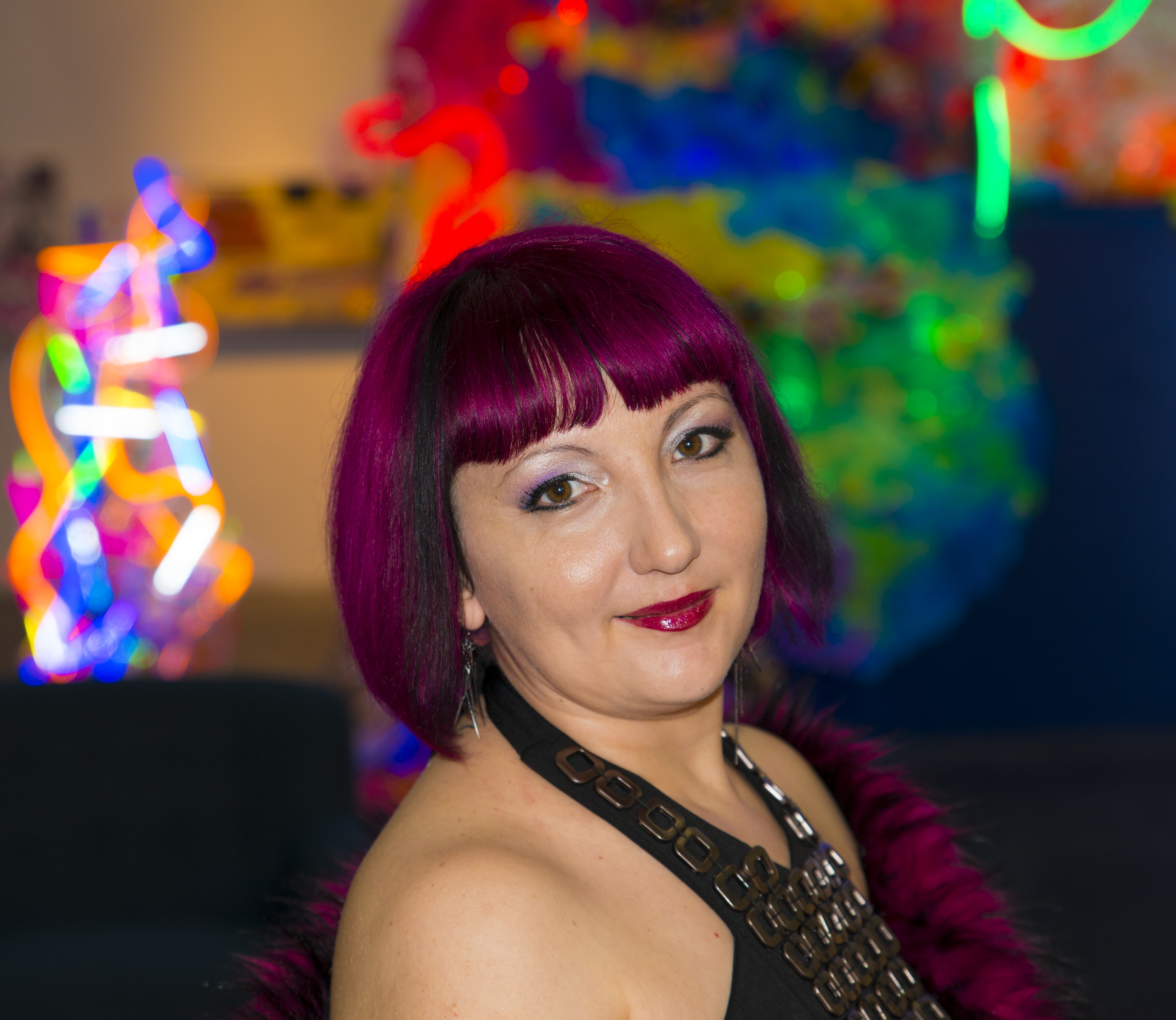
- Born: 1976 (age 49–50); Romania
- Education: University of Houston (BFA); University of North Texas (MFA)
- Website: adelaandea.com

Adela Andea (born 1976) is a Romanian-American artist.

== Early life and education ==
Born in 1976 in Romania, Adela Andea immigrated to the United States with her husband in the late 1990s. She obtained a Bachelor of Fine Arts in painting from the University of Houston and later a Master of Fine Arts in new media from University of North Texas.

During her studies, Andea expanded upon the work of light artists such as James Turrell and Dan Flavin by incorporating robotics and mechanical components into her installations.

== Career ==
Andea began her career as a paralegal in Los Angeles and pursued painting as a hobby. In 2005, she moved to Texas to complete her art studies.

In 2018, Steve Madden invited Andea to create an installation for a pop-up shopping experience in New York City.

== Work ==
Andea's work uses LED lights, CCFL, computer components, plastics, and electronic elements to create large-scale light installations. Her first major installation, The Green Cyberweb, was presented in 2009 at the Lawndale Art Center in Houston, Texas. Her installations have since been exhibited at various institutions, including the Art Museum of Southeast Texas, Art League Houston, Blue Star Contemporary Art Center, the Centre for International Light Art, the McKinney Avenue Contemporary, the Museum of Geometric and MADI Art, the Pearl Fincher Museum of Fine Arts, The Grace Museum, Women & Their Work, and Zebra 3 (Crystal Palace). She is also involved as a contributing artist for the Meow Wolf Houston project.

Her artworks are included in the permanent collection of the Centre for International Light Art in Unna, Germany. Additional installations are housed at Drewery Place in Houston and as part of the Public Art Collection at Texas Tech University in Lubbock.
