= Adelaide (given name) =

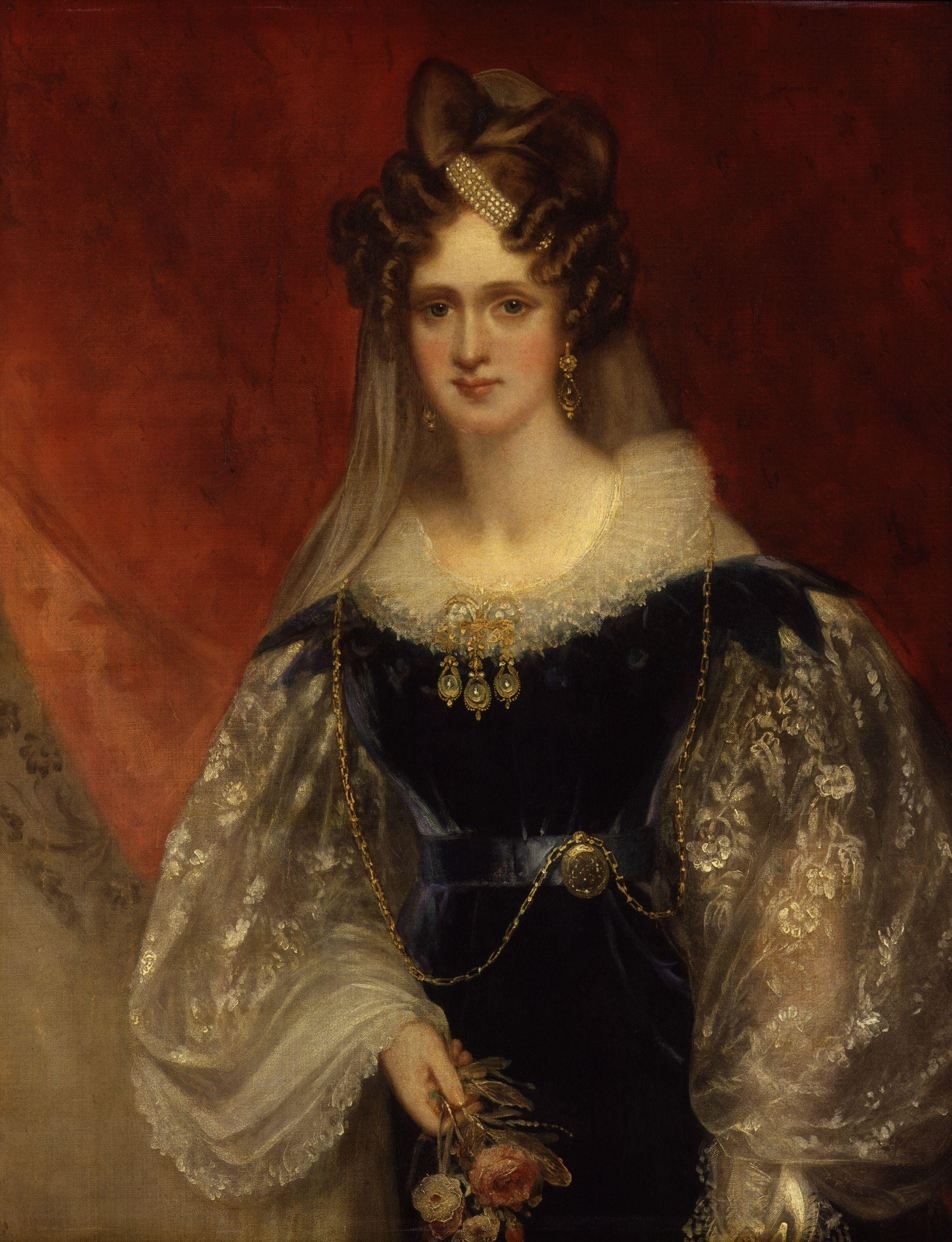
- Adelaide of Saxe-Meiningen
- Pronunciation: /ˈædɪleɪd/
- Gender: Female
- Language: English
- Name day: December 16

Origin
- Origin: Old High German
- Meaning: nobility
- Region of origin: World wide

Other names
- Nicknames: Addie, Della, Aida, Lainey, Adele, Delly, Leda, Adela, and Aley
- Related names: Addie, Addy, Adi, Adelheid, Adel, Heidi, Adelle, Adèle, Adela, Adelina, Adeline, Adolat, Alice, Alida, Alison, Ethel, Zélie, Alix
- Popularity: see popular names

Adelaide is a feminine given name from the English form of a Germanic given name, from the Old High German Adalheidis, meaning "noble natured".

The modern German form is Adelheid, famously the first name of Queen Adelaide, for whom many places throughout the former British Empire were named.

The French form is Adélaïde or Adélaide, and Czech is Adéla or Adléta. The name Addie is a diminutive of Adelaide and Heidi is a nickname for Adelheid, which became internationally popular on its own as a result of Johanna Spyri's novel Heidi (1880).

== People with the name ==
=== Nobles ===
- Saint Adelaide of Italy (died 999), wife of Otto the Great
- Adelaide of Aquitaine (died 1004)
- Saint Adelaide, Abbess of Vilich (died 1015)
- Adelaide of Susa (died 1091)
- Adelaide del Vasto (died 1118)
- Adelaide, Countess of Vermandois (died 1120 or 1124)
- Adelaide of Maurienne (1092–1154)
- Adelaide of Poland (died 1211)
- Adelaide of Holland (1230–1284)
- Adélaïde of France (1732–1800), daughter of King Louis XV
- Marie-Adélaïde de La Touche-Limouzinière (1760–1794), French aristocrat and counter-revolutionary
- Adélaïde d'Orléans (1777–1847)
- Adelaide of Saxe-Meiningen (1792–1849), Queen Consort of William IV of the United Kingdom
- Adelaide of Löwenstein-Wertheim-Rosenberg (1831–1909), Queen Consort of Miguel I of Portugal
- Adelaide Guinness, Viscountess Iveagh (1844–1916), Irish aristocrat

=== Other people ===
- Adelaide Steele Baylor (1860–1935), American educator and school administrator
- Adelaide George Bennett (1848–1911), American poet and botanist
- Adelaide Avery Claflin (1846–1931), American woman suffragist and ordained minister
- Adelaide Clemens (born 1989), Australian actress
- Adélaïde Dufrénoy (1765–1825), French poet and painter
- Adelaide Dutcher (fl. 1901), American physician and public health worker
- Adelaide Easley (1902–1974), American physicist
- Adelaida Ferré Gomis (1881–1955), historian, teacher, and folklorist of Catalan lace-making
- Adelaide Fischer (1889–c.1950), American soprano singer
- Adelaide Hall (disambiguation) (many people)
- Adelaide Hawkins (1914–2008), American cryptologist
- Adelaide Hoodless (1858–1910), Canadian educational reformer
- Adelaide Kane (born 1990), Australian actress
- Adelaide Knight (1871–1950), British suffragette
- Adélaïde Labille-Guiard (1749–1803), French history and portrait painter
- Adélaïde Leroux (born 1982), French actress
- Adelaide Miethke (1881–1962), Australian educator
- Adelaide Neri (1940–2018), Brazilian teacher and politician
- Adelaide Anne Procter (1825–1864), English poet and philanthropist
- Adelaide Day Rollston (1854–1941), American poet and author
- Adelaide Thompson Spurgeon (c.1826–1907), American Civil War nurse
- Adelaide Cilley Waldron (1843–1909), American author, editor, clubwoman
- Adelaide Wallerstein (1869–1942), American translator, medical doctor, lawyer and clubwoman
- Mary Adelaide Dickey (1884–1960), American vaudeville performer known as 'La Petite Adelaide'
- T. Adelaide Goodno (1858–1931), American social reformer

== Fictional characters with the name ==
- Adelaide, a character on the television series Over the Garden Wall
- Miss Adelaide, a character in the musical Guys and Dolls
- Adelaide Brubaker, a character on the television series Diff'rent Strokes
- Adelaide "Addy" Wilson, a character on the television series Gimme a Break!
- Adelaide "Addy" Wilson, née Thomas, a character in the 2019 movie Us
- Adelaide Brooke, base commander in Doctor Who episode "The Waters of Mars"
- Madame Adelaide Bonfamille, a character in the Disney movie The Aristocats
- Adelaide Chang, the younger sister of Sid Chang in The Casagrandes
- Aunt Adelaide, a character from the 2005 movie Nanny McPhee
- Adelaide "Ada-1" Meyrin, an Exo gunsmith and head of the Black Armory in Destiny 2
- Adelheid, a character from the 2015 movie “Heidi”
- Adelaide "Addy" Muchmore, a character from Taffy, the granddaughter of Mrs. Muchmore
- Adelaid Adams, the exalted singer and performer in Calamity Jane
- Adelaide Prentiss, in Karen McManus's One of Us Is Lying
- Queen Adelaide Washington in Katharine McGee's American Royals

== See also ==
- Adelais
- Adelheid
- Alice (name)
- Marie Adelaide (disambiguation)
