= Adelina (given name) =

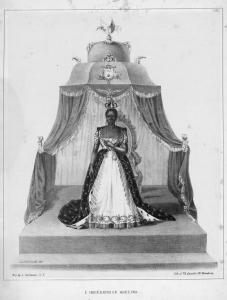
Empress of Haiti, Adélina Soulouque

Adelina is the Italian variant of Adeline, meaning 'noble' or 'nobility'. Its other variants are Adtelina, Adela, Adelia, Della, Adalyn, Adalynn, Adelyn, Alene, Aline, Delia, Aada and Ada.

Notable people with the name include:

- Adelina of Holland (c. 990 – c. 1045), Dutch noblewoman
- Saint Adelina (died 1125), French Benedictine nun
- Adelina Abranches (1866–1945), Portuguese stage actress
- Adelina Adalis (1900–1969), Soviet poet, prose writer, and translator
- Adelina Akhmetova (born 1998), Kazakhstani hurdler
- Adelina Barrion (1951–2010), Filipino entomologist
- Adelina Beljajeva (born 2003), Estonian rhythmic gymnast
- Adelina Boguș (born 1988) Romanian rower
- Adelina Budai-Ungureanu (born 2000), Romanian volleyball player
- Adelina Catalani (fl. 1818–1832), Franco-Italian soprano
- Adelina Chilica, Angolan politician
- Adelina Cojocariu (born 1988), Romanian rower
- Adelina Covián, Spanish painter
- Adelina Dematti de Alaye (1927–2016), Argentine human rights activist
- Adelina Domingues (1888–2002), American supercentenarian
- Adelina Munro Drysdale (1896–1942), Argentine socialite
- Adelina Engman (born 1994), Finnish footballer
- Adelina von Fürstenberg, Swiss art curator
- Adelina Galyavieva (born 1996), Russian-French ice dancer
- Adelina Garcia (1923–1999), American singer
- Adelina García Casillas (c. 1920–1939), member of the Las Trece Rosas
- Adelina Gavrilă (born 1978), Romanian triple jumper
- Adelina Gonzalez (born 1964), Spanish sailor
- Adelina Gurrea (1896–1971), Filipino journalist
- Adelina Gutiérrez (1925–2015), Chilean scientist
- Adelina Ibatullina (born 1999), Russian pentathlete
- Adelina Ismajli (born 1979), Albanian-Kosovar singer
- Adelina Kondrátieva (1917–2012), Argentine-Russian translator
- Adelina de Lara (1872–1961), British pianist
- Adélina Lévêque (c. 1795 – after 1859), Empress Consort of Haiti
- Dóris Monteiro or Adelina Dóris Monteiro (born 1934), Brazilian singer
- Adelina Murio-Celli d'Elpeux (1844–1900), Polish opera singer, music teacher, and composer
- Adelina Nicholls, Mexican sociologist
- Adelina Otero-Warren (1881–1965), American suffragist
- Adelina Paschalis-Souvestre (1847–1925), Polish singer and music teacher
- Adelina Pastor (born 1993), Romanian sprinter
- Adelina Patti (1843–1919), Italian opera singer
- Adelina Razetdinova (born 2000), Russian Paralympic swimmer
- Adelina Santos Rodriguez (1920–2021), Filipina politician and civil leader
- Adelina Sotnikova (born 1996), Russian figure skater
- Adelina Stehle (1860–1945), Austrian opera singer
- Adelina Tattilo (1929–2007), Italian magazine editor
- Adelina Thaçi (born 1980), Albanian-Kosovar singer
- Adelina Tuitt, Montserratian politician
- Adelina Lopes Vieira (1850–1922/1933), Brazilian poet, playwright, and writer
- Adelina Zagidullina (born 1993), Russian fencer
- Adelina Zandrino (1893–1994), Italian artist and illustrator
- Adelina Zendejas (1909–1993), Mexican teacher, journalist, and feminist

== Fictional characters ==
- Adelina, in Lorien Legacies, a young adult science fiction book series
- Adelina of Naples, in one segment of Yesterday, Today and Tomorrow, a 1963 anthology film

== See also ==
- Adelina (disambiguation)
