= Adeline =

Adeline may refer to:

== People ==
- Adeline (given name)
- Yves-Marie Adeline (born 1960), French Catholic writer

== Places ==
- Adeline, Illinois, village in Maryland Township, Ogle County, Illinois, USUALLY for

== Arts and entertainment ==
- Adeline Records, recording label in the US
- Adeline Software International, discontinued video game developing company situated in France
- Ballade pour Adeline, 1976 instrumental
- Portrait of Mary Adeline Williams, the title of two separate oil on canvas paintings by Thomas Eakins
- "Adeline" (song), a song by British indie rock band alt-J

== Other uses ==
- Adelines, Adeleorina blood parasites of the families Adeleidae and Legerellidae
- Cyclone Adeline, two tropical cyclones near Australia: 1973 and 2005
- Pépinières Arboretum Adeline, commercial nursery with arboretum in France
- Adeline (rocket), a reusable rocket concept from Airbus

== See also ==
- Sweet Adeline (disambiguation)
- Adaline (disambiguation)
