= Azalea (disambiguation) =

The azalea is a flowering shrub.

Azalea may also refer to:

== Places ==
- Azalea, Oregon, United States, an unincorporated community
- Azalea State Natural Reserve, a nature reserve in California
- Isahaya Park or Azalea, a park in Nagasaki Prefecture, Japan
- 1056 Azalea, an asteroid

== Ships ==
- Azalea-class sloop, a class of minesweeping sloops in the UK Royal Navy including HMS Azalea (1915)
- HMS Azalea (K25), a corvette in the UK Royal Navy
- USS Azalea (1864), a Civil War armed tugboat
- USLHT Azalea (1891) or USS Azalea, a lighthouse tender in the US Navy
- USS Azalea (1915), a United States Navy ship

== Sports ==
- Azalea Open Invitational, a PGA Tour golf tournament last played in 1971
- Azalea Stakes, a thoroughbred horse race in Miami Gardens, Florida
- Azalea Trail Run, an annual road running event in Mobile, Alabama
- Palatka Azaleas, a minor league baseball team based in Palatka, Florida, up to 1953

== Arts and entertainment ==
- Iggy Azalea, stage name of Australian rapper and former model Amethyst Amelia Kelly (born 1990)
- "Azaleas", a Korean poem by Kim Sowol
- "Azalea", a song by Duke Ellington & Louis Armstrong
- "Azalea", a song by Boa Kwon
- "Azalea", a song by Nano Ripe
- Azalea, a subunit of Aqours from Love Live! Sunshine!!, a Japanese multimedia project
- Azalea Berges, a character in Poison Ivy: The Secret Society, a 2008 made-for-television film
- Azalea Kathryn Wentworth, protagonist of the novel Entwined

== Publications ==
- Azalea: A Magazine by Third World Lesbians, a quarterly published between 1977 and 1983
- Azalea, a journal of Korean literature published by the University of Hawaiʻi Press

== Other uses ==
- Azalea (chimpanzee), a chimpanzee at the Korea Central Zoo that smokes cigarettes
- Azalea Pictures, a film company responsible for B movies such as Mars Needs Women
- Azalea (given name)

== See also ==
- Azala (disambiguation)
- Azalia (disambiguation)
- Azealia Banks (born 1991), American rapper
