= Mary Adelaide =

Mary Adelaide may refer to:

- Mary Adelaide Dickey (1882–1960), American vaudeville performer
- Mary Adelaide Eden Phillpotts, birth name of Adelaide Phillpotts (1896–1993), English novelist, poet, and playwright
- Mary Adelaide Hare (1865–1945), English teacher of deaf children, and suffragist
- Mary Adelaide Nutting (1858–1948), Canadian nurse, educator, and pioneer
- Mary Adelaide Virginia Thomasina Eupatoria FitzPatrick, birth name of Patsy Cornwallis-West (1854–1920), Irish aristocrat and mistress of King Edward VII
- Mary Adelaide Walker, 19th-century English writer
- Princess Mary Adelaide of Cambridge (1833–1897), later Duchess of Teck, by marriage
- Princess Marie Adélaïde of France (1732–1800), daughter of Louis XV
- Marie-Adélaïde, Grand Duchess of Luxembourg (1894–1924), sovereign of Luxembourg
- Marie Adélaïde of Savoy (1685–1712), mother of Louis XV
