= Adeline (given name) =

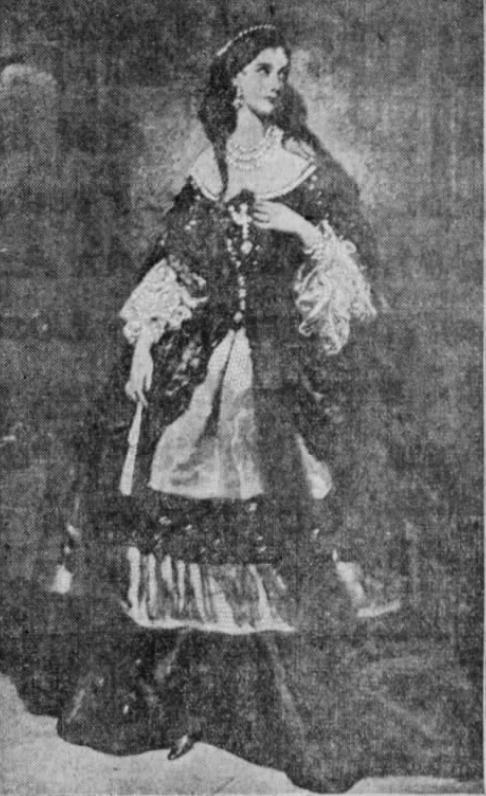
- Adeline, Countess of Cardigan and Lancastre, the second wife of James Brudenell; a British noble.

Origin
- Origin: German
- Meaning: "Noble"

Other names
- Variant forms: Adaline, Adalyn, Adalynn, Adelyn, Adalene, Adeleine, Adylene, Adilynn, Adelynn, Adelin
- Nicknames: Addie, Addi, Addy, Lynn
- Related names: Ada, Alina, Zélie, Adele, Adelina

Adeline is a feminine given name meaning 'noble' or 'nobility'; it is of German origin and derived from Old High German adal "noble". The root lives on in the New High German words Adel "nobility," edel "noble," and adelig "noble." It is related to the given name Adelaide and its diminutive Adèle. Adeline was introduced to England by the Normans in the 11th century and was very common in the Middle Ages. Its variants include Adelin, Adelina, Adaline, Adalyn, Adalynn, Adelyn, Adalene, Adeleine, Adylene, Aada, Ada, Alina, Aline, Adelita and Alita, Zélie.

Notable people with the name include:

- Adeline Pond Adams (1859–1948), American writer and wife of Herbert Adams
- Adeline, Countess of Cardigan and Lancastre (1825–1915), wife of James Brudenell, 7th Earl of Cardigan
- Adeline André, French fashion designer and the head of one of the ten haute couture design houses in Paris
- Adeline Bourne (1873–1965), Anglo-Indian actress, suffragette, and charity worker
- Adeline Canac (born 1990), French pair skater, currently skating with Yannick Bonheur
- Adeline Chapman (1847–1931), English campaigner for women's suffrage
- Adeline Genée DBE (1878–1970), Danish/British ballet dancer
- Adeline Geo-Karis (1918–2008), Republican politician and a member of the Illinois Senate for the 31st District
- Adeline Hazan (born 1956), French politician, MEP for the east of France, and mayor of Reims since March 2008
- Adeline Kerrar (1924–1995), infielder and catcher, played in the All-American Girls Professional Baseball League in 1944
- Adeline Knapp (1860–1909), American journalist, author, social activist, environmentalist, and educator
- Adeline Masquelier (born 1960), Associate professor of anthropology at Tulane University in New Orleans, Louisiana
- Adeline McKinlay, American tennis player of the end of the 19th century
- Adeline Miller, alias Adeline Furman, American madam and prostitute
- Adeline Rittershaus (1876–1924), philologist, a scholar in Old Scandinavian literature, and champion for the equality of women
- Frances Adeline "Fanny" Seward (1844–1866), daughter of United States Secretary of State William H. Seward
- Frances Adeline Seward (1805–1865), born in 1805, the daughter of Judge Elijah Miller and Hannah Foote Miller
- Louise Adeline Weitzel (1862–1934), German-American writer
- Adeline Dutton Train Whitney (1824–1906), American poet and writer of books for girls
- Adeline Virginia Woolf (1882–1941), British modernist author
- Adeline Wuillème (born 1975), French foil fencer who competed in three Olympic games
- Adeline Yen Mah, Chinese-American author and physician
- Adeline Zachert (1876–1965), Russian-born American librarian
- Lisa Adeline Mainiero, American writer and management professor

== See also ==
- Adeline (disambiguation)
