= Marie Adelaide =

Marie Adelaide or Marie-Adelaide may refer to:

- Marie Adélaïde of Savoy (1685–1712), Duchess of Burgundy and Dauphine of France, mother of King Louis XV
- Princess Marie Adélaïde of France (1732–1800), daughter of King Louis XV
- Marie-Adélaïde, Grand Duchess of Luxembourg (1894–1924)
- Princess Marie-Adélaïde of Luxembourg (1924–2007), niece of the above
- Marie-Adélaïde Barthélemy-Hadot (1763–1821), French novelist and playwright
- Marie-Adélaïde Baubry-Vaillant (1827–1899), French painter
- Marie-Adélaïde de La Touche-Limouzinière (1760–1794), French aristocrat and counter-revolutionary

== See also ==
- Marie-Louise-Adélaïde Boizot (1744–1800), French engraver
