= Robert-Fleury =

Robert-Fleury may refer to:

- Joseph-Nicolas Robert-Fleury (1797 – 1890), French painter
- Tony Robert-Fleury (1837 – 1911), French painter
