= Zélie (given name) =

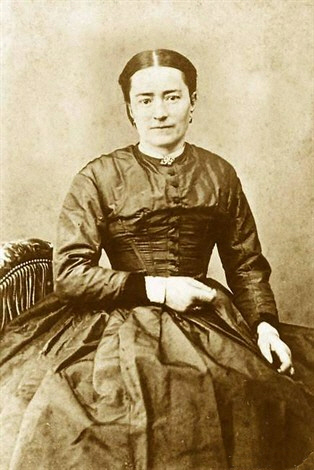
- Marie-Azélie "Zélie" Guérin (1833–1877) was canonized as a Roman Catholic saint in 2015.
- Gender: Feminine

Origin
- Origin: French, Germanic, or Latin.
- Meaning: azalea or noble or solemn or heaven or zeal.

Other names
- Related names: Ada, Adela, Adele, Adelaide, Adeline, Alice, Alison, Azalea, Azaylee, Azélie, Celia, Célie, Solange, Solenne, Zaylee, Zelia, Zelie, Zéline, Zellie

La Belle Zélie, an 1806 portrait by Jean-Auguste-Dominique Ingres.

Zélie is a French short form of the name Azélie. Anglicized spellings and pronunciations of the name also in use include Zelie and Zellie. In some instances the name Zaylee and its spelling variants are intended as phonetic versions of Zélie.

== Etymology ==
Derived from the Occitan Azalaïs, the name Azélie evolved from Adelais, which had itself been shortened from the same ancient Germanic source Adalheidis, meaning noble, as the other modern English forms Ada, Adela, Adele, Adelaide, Adeline, Alice, Alicia, and Alison and other variants.

The name Zélie also has other origins.

A connection to the French names Solange and Solenne, meaning solemn, via the short form Zéline, has also been suggested.

It has also been considered a French form of the flower name Azalea. The French word for the flower is azalée.

It has also been considered a form of the name Célie, a French version of the name Celia, likely derived from the Latin caelum meaning heaven.

The name is also considered a variant of Zelia, which is a Basque variant of Celia or a feminine version of the Greek name Zelos, meaning intense zeal.

== Popularity ==
The name has gained in usage due to the canonization of Roman Catholic saints Louis Martin and Marie-Azélie Guérin in 2015.

== Notable people ==
- Zélie de Lussan (1861-1949), American opera singer of French descent
- Zelie Emerson (1883-1969), American suffragette active in England
- Marie-Azélie “Zélie” Guérin (1833-1877), French woman and a recently canonized Roman Catholic saint
- Zélie Lardé (1901-1974), Salvadoran painter
