= Adelina =

Adelina may refer to:

== Places ==
- Adelina, Hrubieszów County, Poland, a village
- Adelina, Gmina Chodel, Poland, a village
- Adelina, Maryland, United States, an unincorporated community

== Other uses ==
- Adelina (name), including a list of people and fictional characters with the name
- Adelina (alveolate), a genus of parasitic, eukaryotic microorganisms
- Adelina (beetle), a genus of darkling beetles
- Adelina (opera), an 1810 opera farsa by Pietro Generali, libretto by Gaetano Rossi

== See also ==
- Adelina Patti Theatre, a Welsh opera house
- Adeline (disambiguation)
- Villa Adelina, Argentina
