= Marguerite Jacquelin =

French painter

- Born: 1850; Paris, France
- Died: 1 February 1941 (aged 90–91); Bordeaux, France

Marguerite Jacquelin (1850s – 1 February 1941) was a French flower painter.

Jacquelin was born in Paris and trained with the painters Louis-Auguste Auguin, Léon Bonnat, Maxime Lalanne, and Joseph Nicolas Robert-Fleury. She showed works at the Paris Salon from 1879.

Jacquelin moved to Bordeaux by 1937, where she exhibited works along with her sister Marthe at the Salon there, listing their address as "Rue Emile-Zola 2".

Works by Marguerite Jacquelin

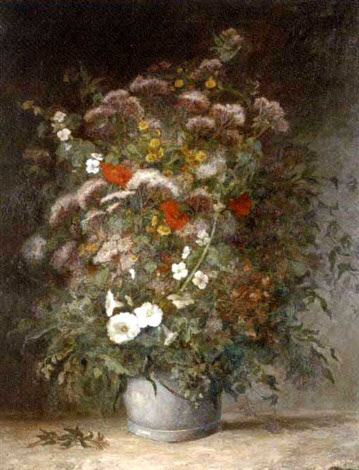
Bouquet of flowers, 1878

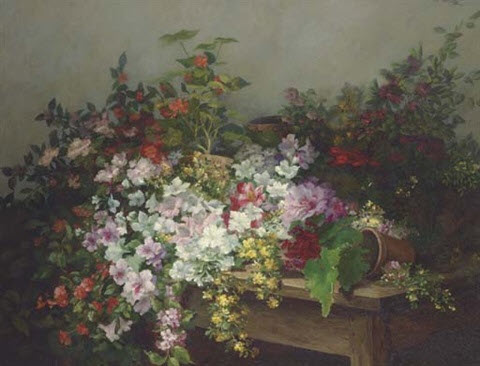
Still life of flowers, circa 1900

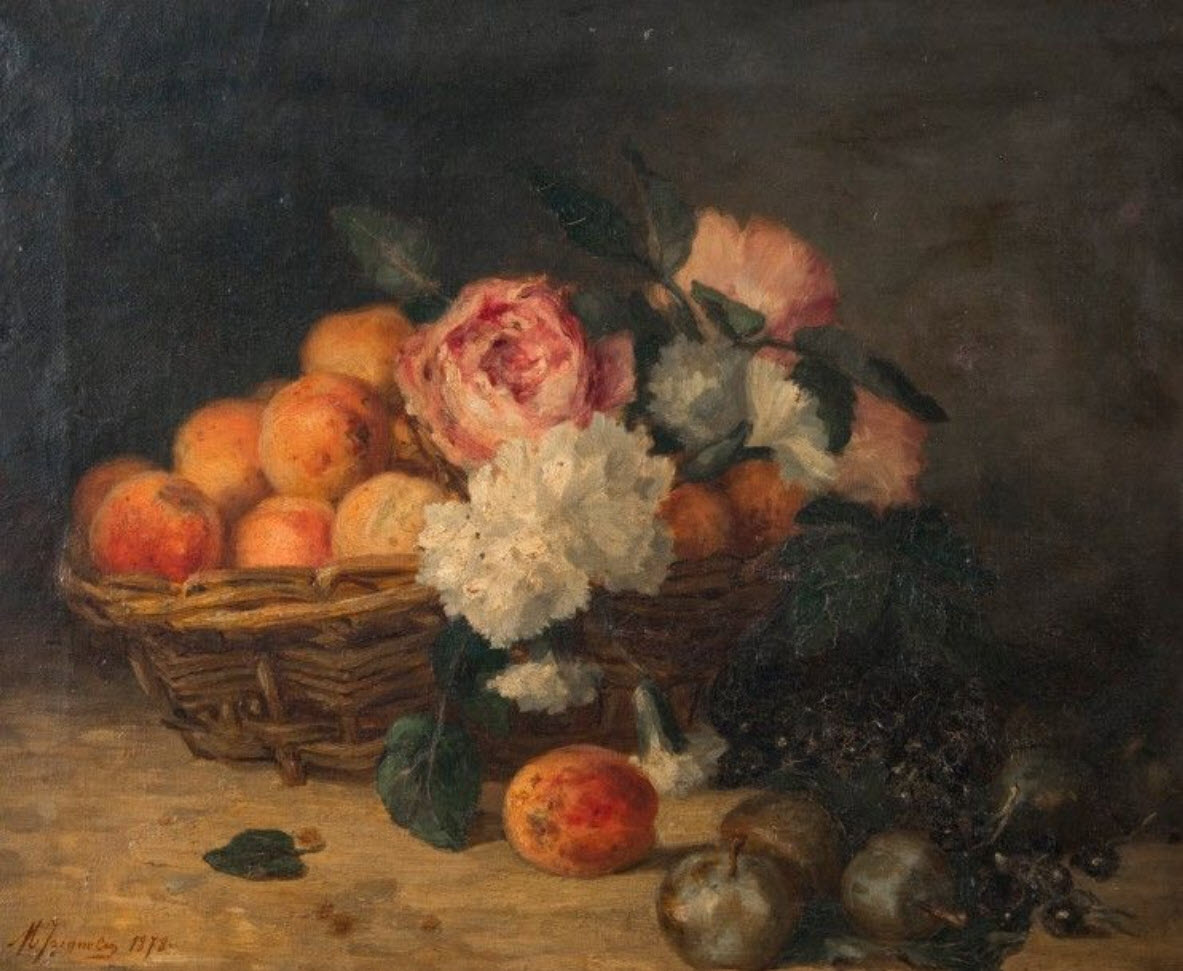
Still life with a basket of plums, peaches, black currants and peonies, circa 1900
