= Azalia =

Azalia may refer to:

- Azalia, Indiana, United States
- Azalia, Michigan, United States
- Azalia Snail, musician
- Emma Azalia Hackley (1867–1922), African-American concert soprano, newspaper editor, teacher, and political activist.
- Intel High Definition Audio, by codename
- A brand name of desogestrel

== See also ==
- Azala (disambiguation)
- Azalea (disambiguation)
