= La Chapelle-Montlinard =

- Commune
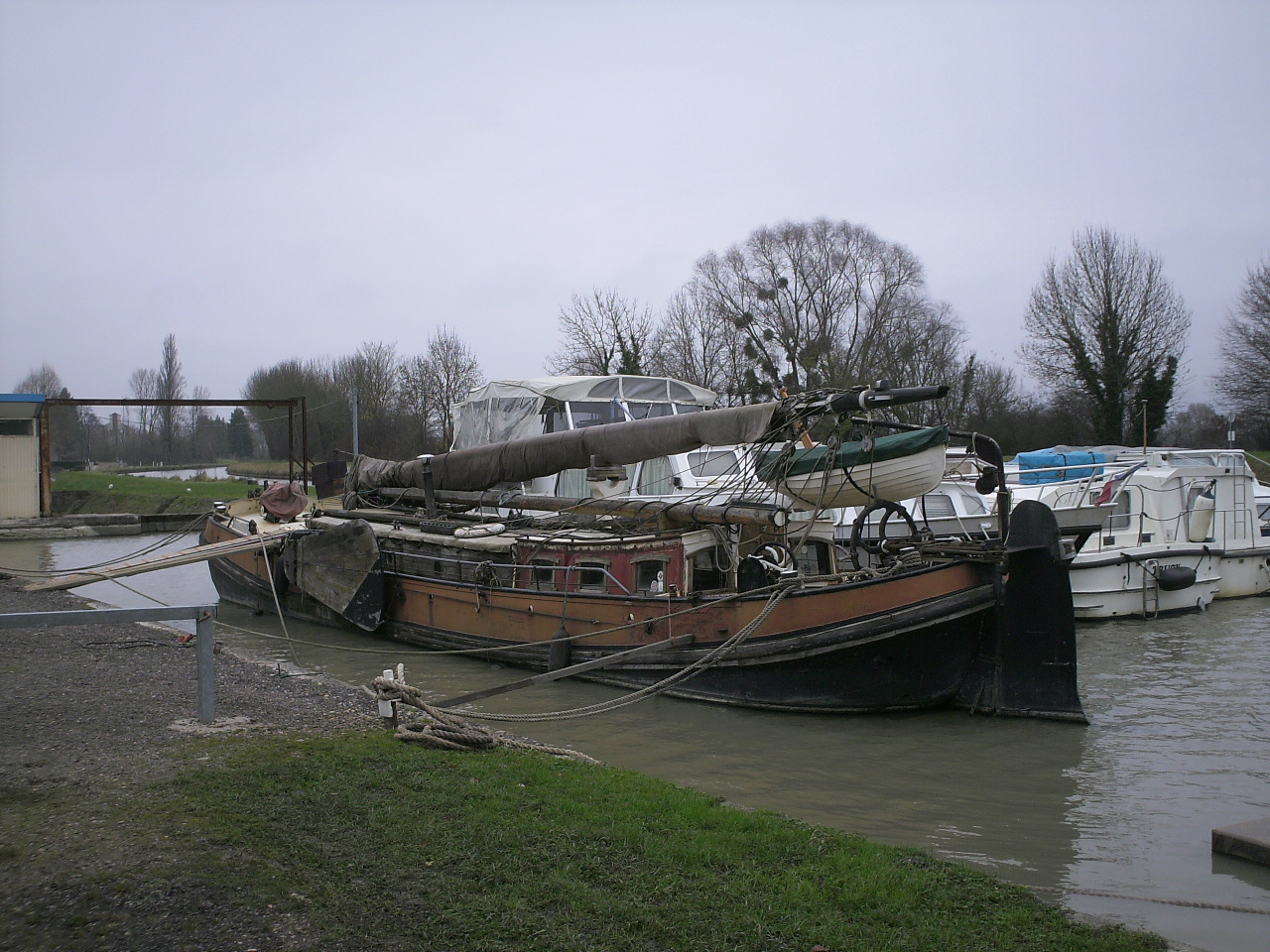
- The port at La Chapelle-Montlinard
- Location of La Chapelle-Montlinard
- Location within France Location within Centre-Val de Loire
- Coordinates: 47°10′21″N 2°59′22″E
- Country: France
- Region: Centre-Val de Loire
- Department: Cher
- Arrondissement: Bourges
- Canton: Avord

Government
  - Mayor (2023–2026): Bernadette Daroux
- Area^{1}: 17.14 km^{2} (6.62 sq mi)
- Highest elevation: 188 m (617 ft)
- Lowest elevation: 150 m (490 ft)
- Population (2023): 491
  - Density: 28.6/km^{2} (74.2/sq mi)
- Time zone: UTC+01:00 (CET)
  - Summer (DST): UTC+02:00 (CEST)
- INSEE/Postal code: 18049 /18140
- ^{1} French Land Register data, which excludes lakes, ponds, glaciers > 1 km^{2} (0.386 sq mi or 247 acres) and river estuaries.

La Chapelle-Montlinard (French pronunciation: [la ʃapɛl mɔ̃linaʁ]) is a commune in the Cher department in the Centre-Val de Loire region of France.

== Geography ==
A farming area, comprising the village and a couple of hamlets situated in the Loire valley, some 29 miles (47 km) east of Bourges, at the junction of the N151 with the D7, D53 and the D45 roads. The Loire lateral canal runs through the village, which lies on the pilgrimage route known as St. James' Way.

== Population ==
Historical population
Year	Pop.	±% p.a.
1968	477	—
1975	497	+0.59%
1982	515	+0.51%
1990	506	−0.22%
1999	494	−0.27%
2007	495	+0.03%
2012	499	+0.16%
2017	471	−1.15%
2023	491	+0.70%
Source: INSEE

== Sights ==
- The Val de Loire National Nature Reserve, opened in 1995.
- The Pépinières Arboretum Adeline horticultural nursery.

== See also ==
- Communes of the Cher department
