= Joseph-Nicolas Robert-Fleury =

French painter (1797–1890)

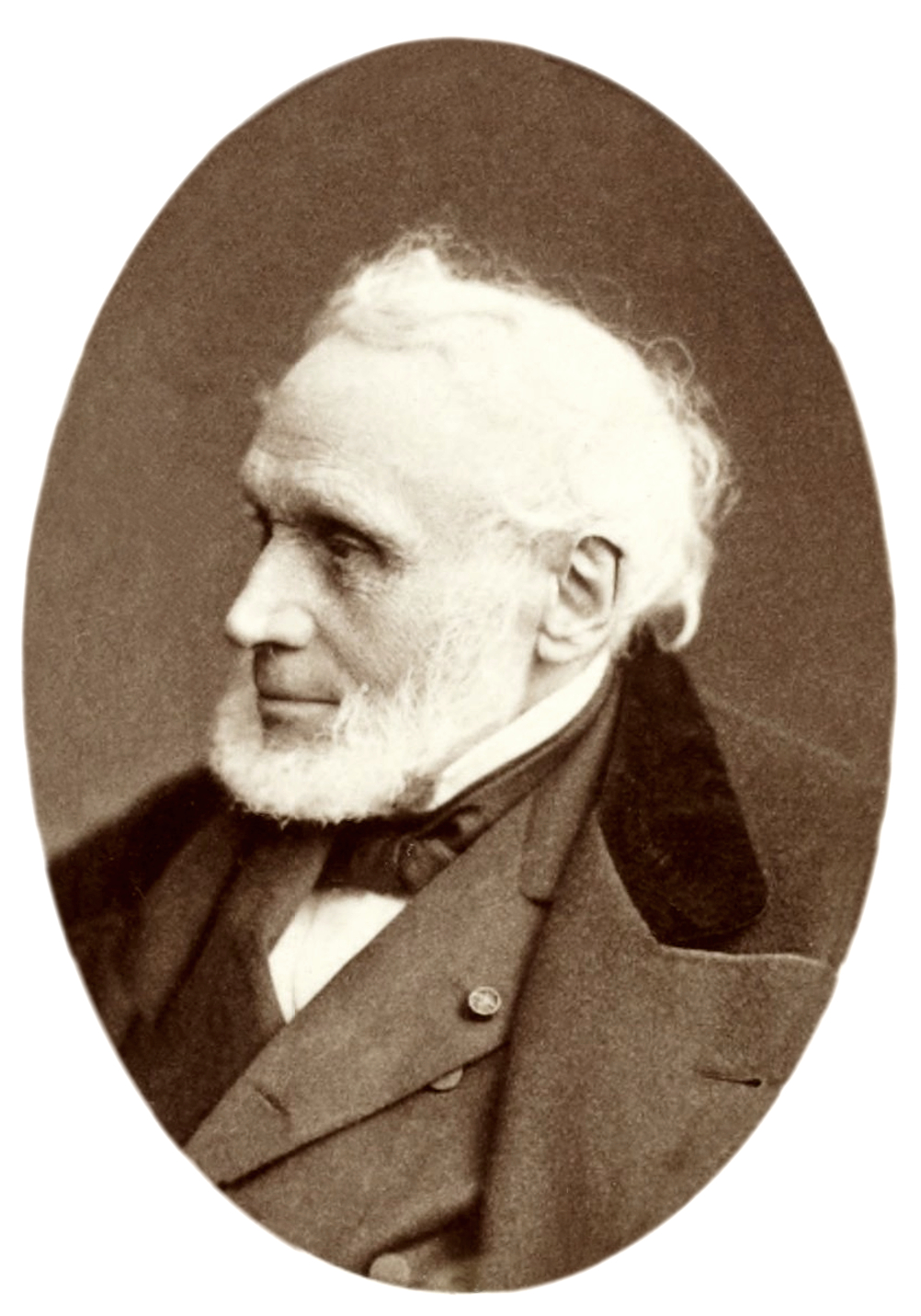
- Photograph by René Dagron (1880)
- Born: 8 August 1797; Cologne
- Died: 5 May 1890 (aged 92); Paris
- Known for: Painting

Joseph-Nicolas Robert-Fleury (8 August 1797 – 5 May 1890) was a French painter.

== Biography ==
Born in Cologne, he was sent by his family to Paris, and after travelling in Italy returned to France and made his first appearance at the Salon in 1824; his reputation, however, was not established until three years later, when he exhibited Tasso at the Convent of Saint Onophrius.

Endowed with a vigorous original talent, and with a vivid imagination, especially for the tragic incidents of history, he soon rose to fame, and in 1850 succeeded François Granet as member of the Académie des Beaux-Arts. In 1855, he was appointed professor and in 1863 director of the École des Beaux-Arts, and in the following year he went to Rome as director of the French Academy in that city.

His pupils included Marie-Adélaïde Baubry-Vaillant, David Bles, Marguerite Jacquelin, Charles-Désiré Hue, Leon Kapliński and Henri Le Riche. His son, Tony Robert-Fleury, was also a painter.

== Honours ==
1887: Knight in the Order of Leopold.

== Selected paintings ==
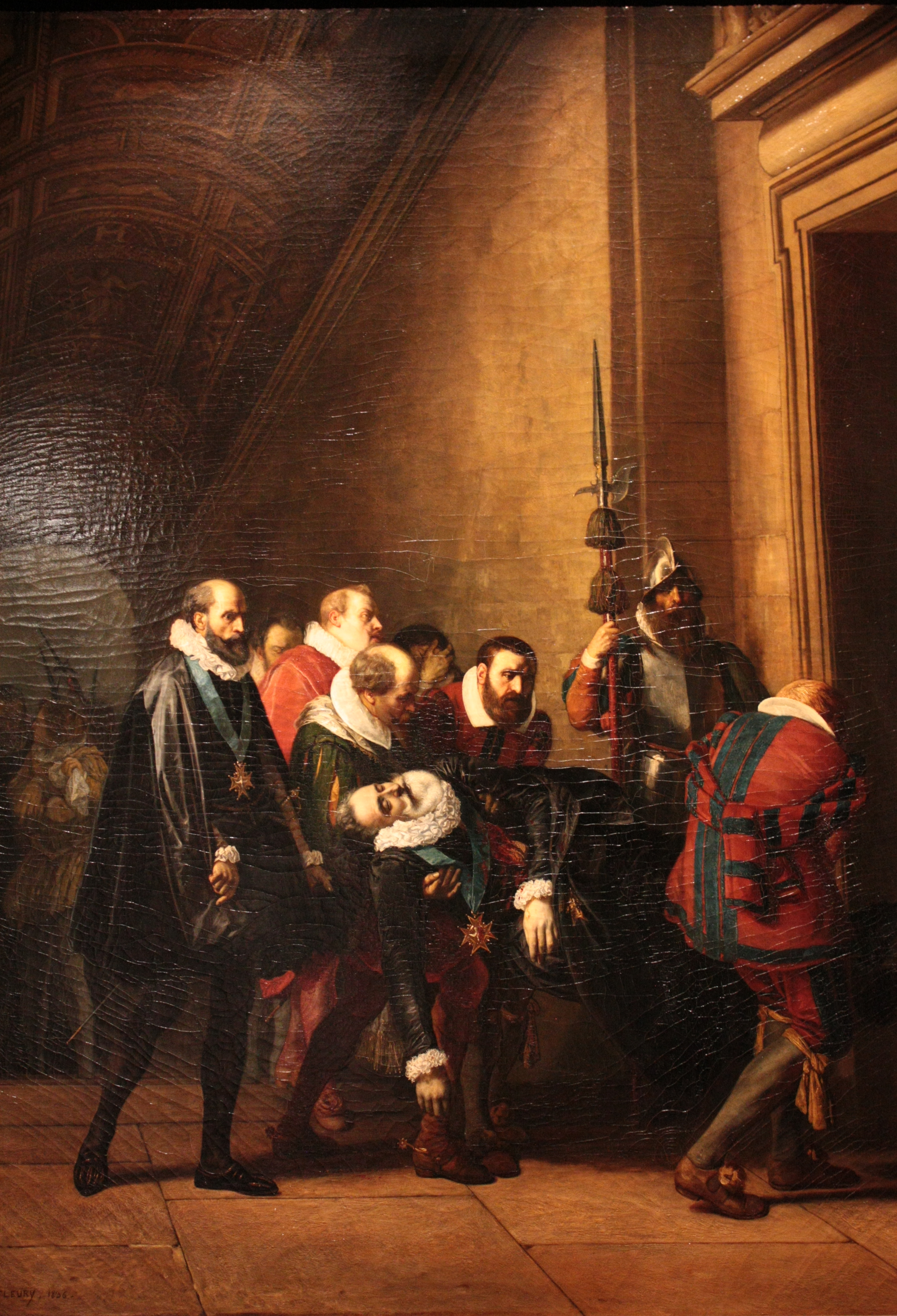
Henry IV, After his Assassination

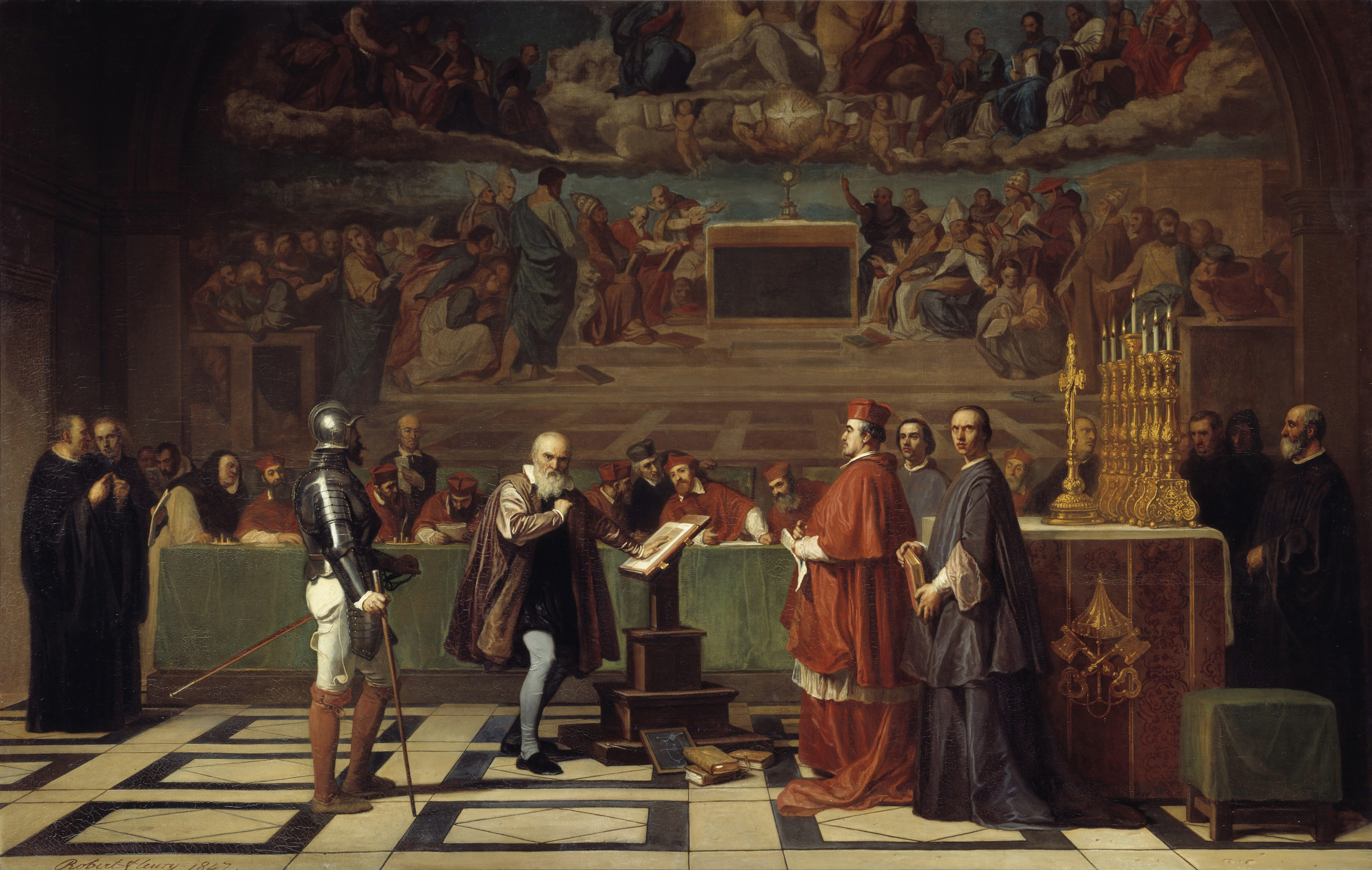
Galileo before the Holy Office

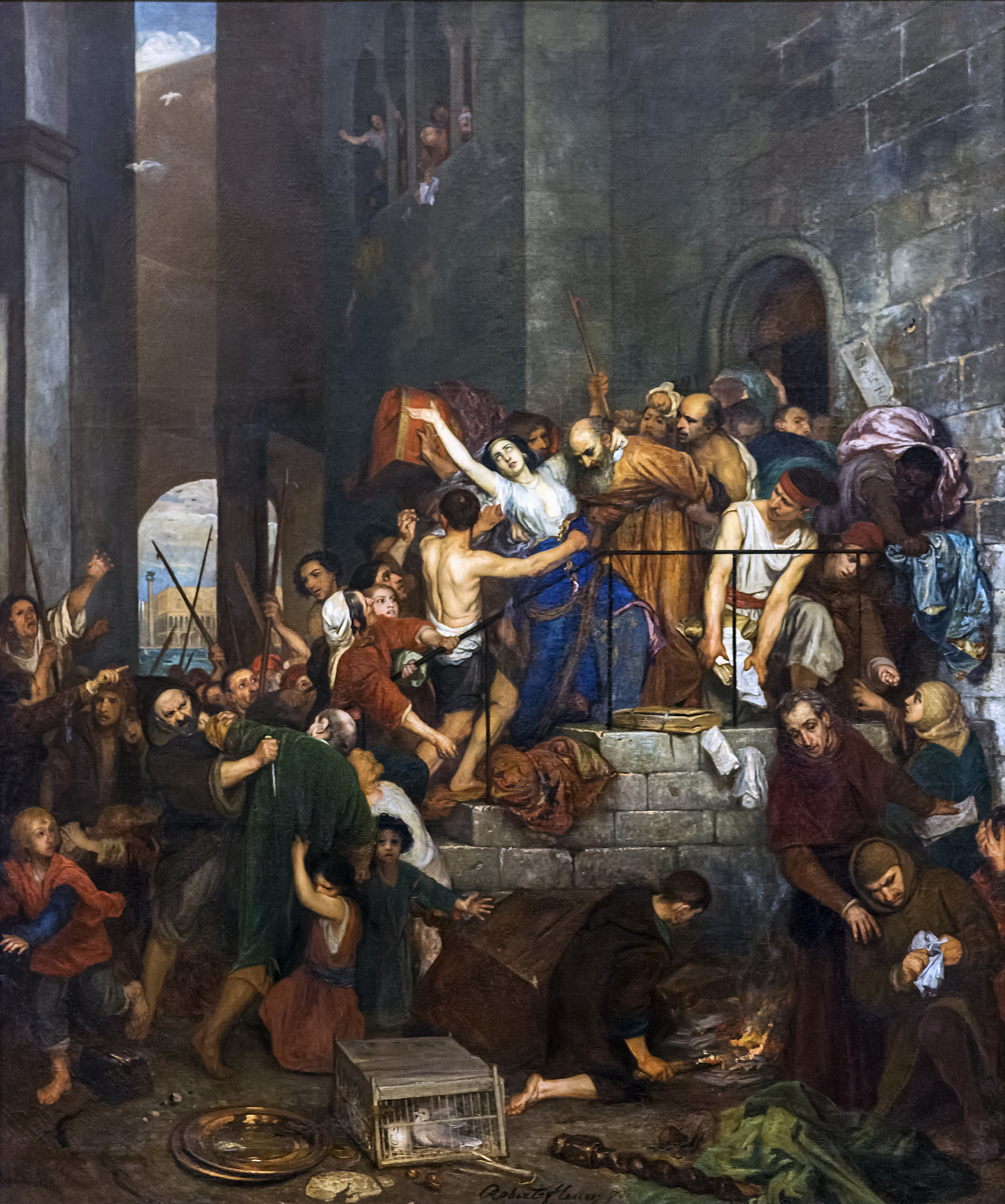
Looting of a house in Giudecca

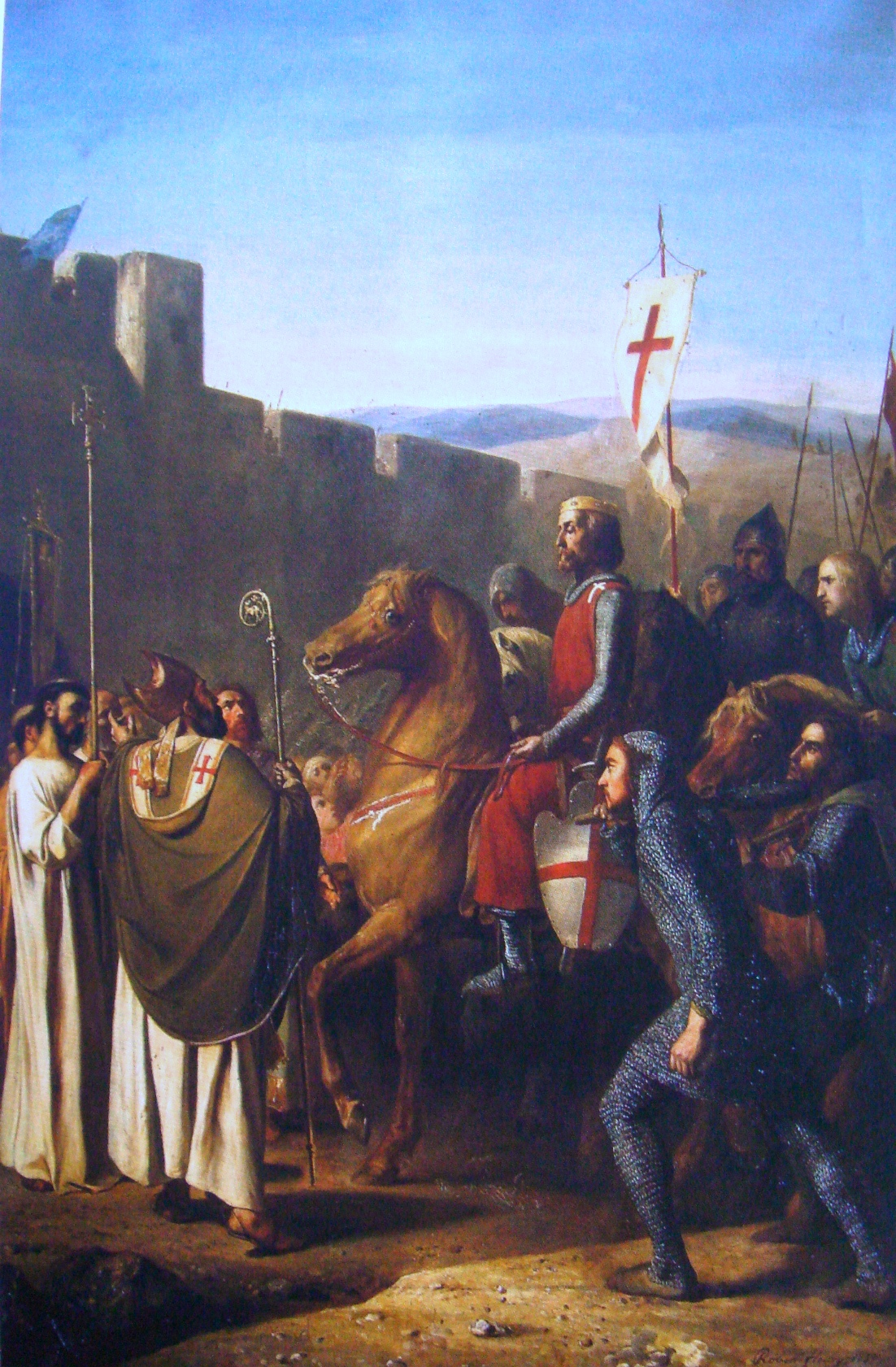
Baldwin I Enters Edessa

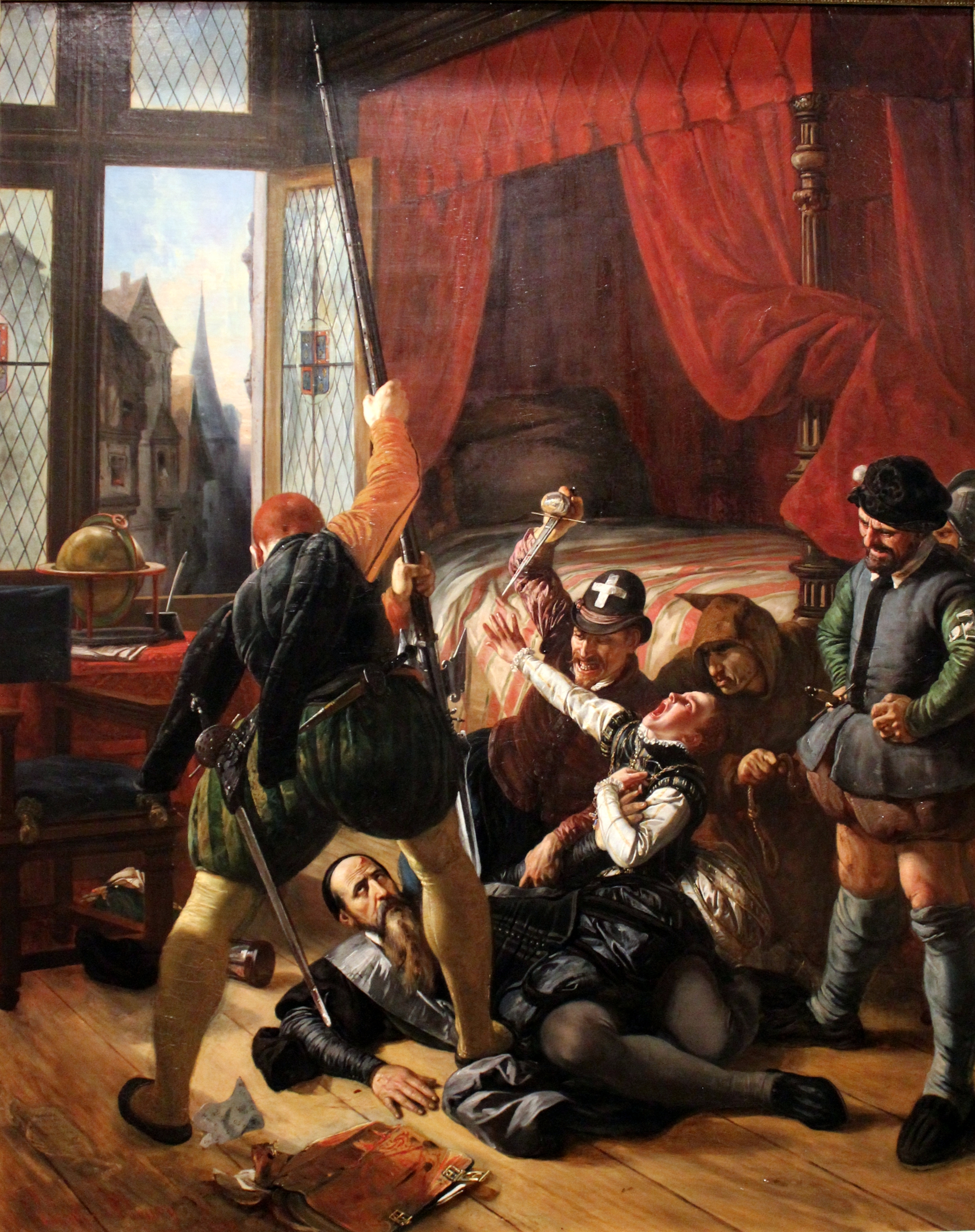
Scene from the St. Bartholomew's Day massacre
