= Adléta =

- Gender: Female
- Name day: 2 September

Origin
- Region of origin: Czech

Adléta is an Old Czech form of the German name Adelaide. In the Czech calendar, it is celebrated on 2 September.

== Famous bearers ==
- Adléta of Meissen, the first Queen consort of Přemysl I of Bohemia
- Adléta von Braunschweig-Grubenhagen, daughter of Jindřich I. von Braunschweig and Anežka Durynská
