= Azala =

Azala may refer to:

- Azala, an Ancient Babylonian cartographer. See: History of cartography#Ancient Near East
- Azala, a character from the video game Chrono Trigger. See: Characters of Chrono Trigger#Ayla
- Azala, the goddess of air in the Cirque du Soleil production Dralion
- Azala, main page in the Basque Wikipedia
- Princess Azala, a character from the 1944 Colombian film serial The Desert Hawk

== See also ==
- Azalea (disambiguation)
- Azalia (disambiguation)
- Azela Robinson (born 1965), British-born Mexican actress
- Azula, antagonist in Avatar: The Last Airbender
