= Júlia Lopes de Almeida =

Brazilian writer

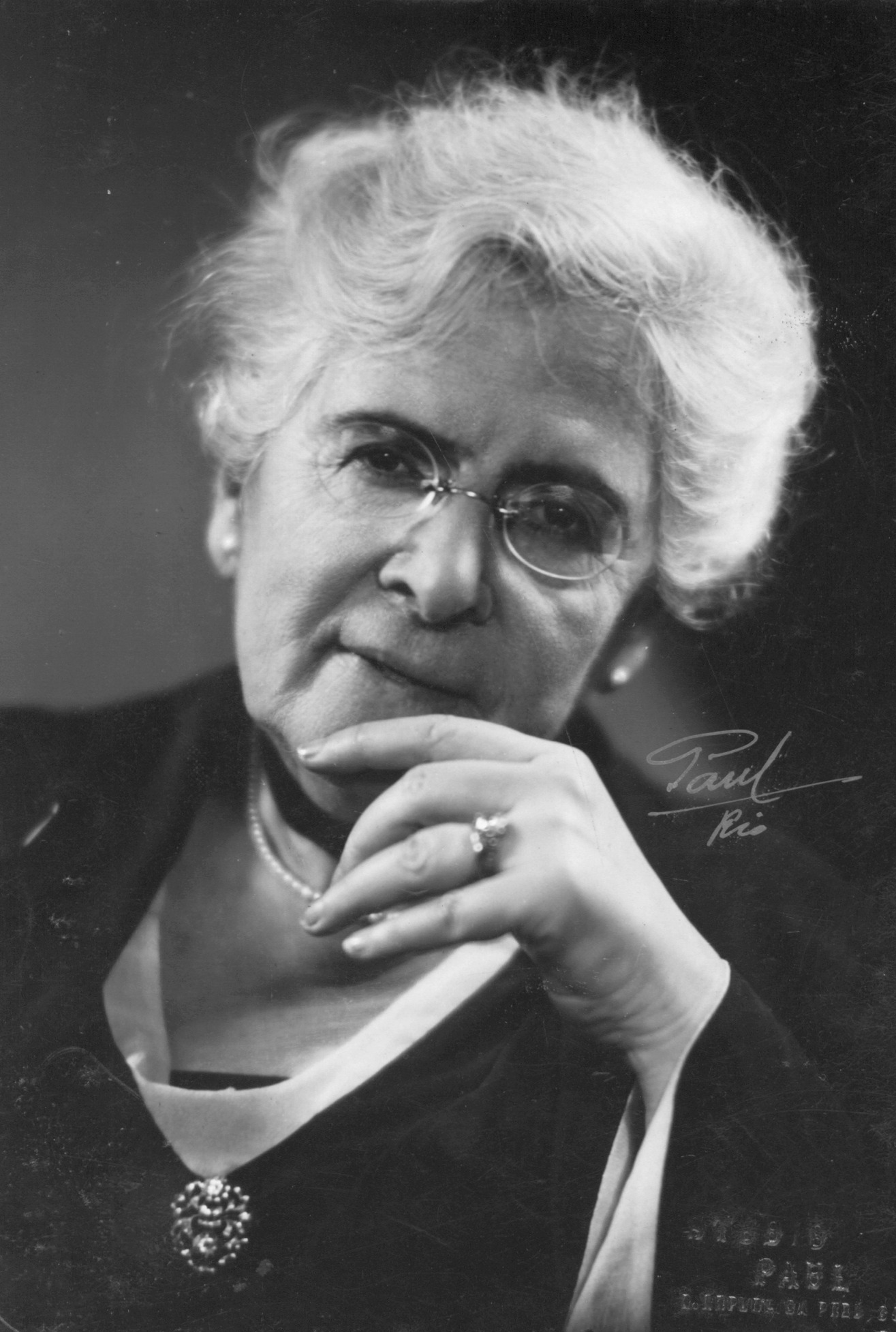
- Sketch included in the first edition of Ância Eterna
- Born: September 24, 1862; Rio de Janeiro, Brazil
- Died: May 30, 1934 (aged 71); Rio de Janeiro, Brazil
- Occupations: Writer, journalist, Lecturer and Women's Rights Advocate.
- Writing career
- Notable works: Memórias de Marta, A Família Medeiros, Livro das Noivas, A Falência, Ância Eterna, Eles e Elas, Correio da Roça

Júlia Valentina da Silveira Lopes de Almeida (September 24, 1862 – May 30, 1934) was one of the first Brazilian women to earn acclaim and social acceptance as a writer. In a career that spanned five decades, she wrote in a variety of literary genres; however, it is her fiction, written under the influence of the naturalists Émile Zola and Guy de Maupassant, that has captured the attention of recent critics. Her notable novels include Memórias de Marta (Marta's Memoirs), the first Brazilian novel to take place in an urban tenement, A Família Medeiros (The Medeiros Family), and A Falência (The Bankruptcy). Immensely influential and appreciated by peers like Aluísio Azevedo, João do Rio and João Luso, she is remembered as an early advocate of modernized gender roles and increased women's rights, as a precursor to later women writers like Clarice Lispector, and for her support of abolition. She was married to the poet Filinto de Almeida.

== Life ==
Almeida was born on September 24, 1862, in Rio de Janeiro. She was daughter of the Visconde de São Valentim (in English "Viscount of Saint Valentine"). Her career started in a newspaper of Campinas, the Gazeta de Campinas, in 1881. That year brought several shifts to Brazilian literature, namely the work Memórias Póstumas de Brás Cubas of Machado de Assis. Lopes de Almeida followed the new trends; however, her fame was ephemeral.

In Imperial Brazil, a woman that was dedicated to literature was seen with certain prejudice. In an interview conceded to João do Rio she said:

Pois eu em moça fazia versos. Ah! Não imagina com que encanto. Era como um prazer proibido! Sentia ao mesmo tempo a delícia de os compor e o medo de que acabassem por descobri-los. Fechava-me no quarto, bem fechada, abria a secretária, estendia pela alvura do papel uma porção de rimas... De repente, um susto. Alguém batia à porta. E eu, com a voz embargada, dando volta à chave da secretária: já vai, já vai! A mim sempre me parecia que se viessem a saber desses versos, viria o mundo abaixo. Um dia porém, eu estava muito entretida na composição de uma história, uma história em verso, com descrições e diálogos, quando ouvi por trás de mim uma voz alegre: – Peguei-te, menina! Estremeci, pus as duas mãos em cima do papel, num arranco de defesa, mas não me foi possível. Minha irmã, adejando triunfalmente a folha e rindo a perder, bradava :– Então a menina faz versos? Vou mostrá-los ao papá! Não mostres! – É que mostro!

When I was a young girl, I wrote verses. Oh! You can't imagine the charm. It was like a forbidden pleasure! I felt both the delight of writing and the fear that someone would discover them. I would shut myself in the bedroom, with the door shut all the way, open the desk, extended by the whiteness of the paper were countless rhymes... Suddenly, something would startle me. Somebody knocked at the door. And I, with a trembling voice, while spinning the desk-key: I'm coming, I'm coming! To me, it seemed that if anyone found out about those verses, the world would fall apart. One day, however, I was very entertained with writing a story, a verse-story, with descriptions and dialogues, when I heard behind me a happy voice: – I got you girl! I trembled, I put my two hands on the paper, in a defensive jerk, but it was impossible. My sister, fluttering the sheet triumphantly and laughing, shouted: – So, the girl writes verses? I'm gonna show them to papa! – Don't show them! I will!

Her first article in Gazeta de Campinas was an article about theater. Although she was one of the first Brazilian women to write, she did not achieve the same success that European female authors had, like George Sand and Jane Austen.

She married the poet Filinto de Almeida. Her most famous works are Família Medeiros ("Medeiros Family") and A Herança ("The Heritage"), both psychological romances. But she also wrote children's literature, specifically between 1900 and 1917. Her main works for children were Histórias de nossa Terra ("Histories of our Land") and Era uma vez ("Once upon a time")

She came from a privileged background and supported the domestic elements of female life. Although she also emphasized the education of woman as better for the family and tried, but failed, to join the Brazilian Academy of Letters.

== Works ==
Almeida authored many works. Her novels and short stories were deeply influenced by Émile Zola and Guy de Maupassant. Particularly notable is her children's literature. In an era when most books destined for children were mere translations of European books, she and her sister, Adelina Lopes Vieira, were amongst the first to write original texts. Her work fell into obscurity after the spread of Brazilian Modernism. Thanks to the recent republication of several of years by Brazil's Editora Mulheres press, her books have been made available to new readers and scholars. However, none have yet been translated in full into English.

=== Novels ===
- ---. Memórias de Marta (Marta's Memoirs). Sorocaba: Durski, 1889. (Serialized in Tribuna Liberal.)
- ---. A Família Medeiros (The Medeiros Family). Rio de Janeiro: Publisher unnamed, 1892. (Serialized in Gazeta de Noticias, 10/16-12/17, 1891.)
- ---. A Viúva Simões (The Widow Simões). Lisbon: António Maria Pereira, 1897. (Serialized in Gazeta de Noticias, 1895.)
- ---. A Falência (The Bankruptcy). Rio de Janeiro: Oficina de Obras d'A Tribuna, 1901.
- ---. A Intrusa (The Intruder). Rio de Janeiro: Francisco Alves, 1908. (Serialized in Jornal do Commercio, 1905.)
- ---. Cruel Amor (Cruel Love). Rio de Janeiro: Francisco Alves, 1911. (Serialized in Jornal do Commercio, 1908.)
- ---. Correio da Roça (Letters from Roça). Rio de Janeiro: Francisco Alves, 1913. (Serialized in O País, 9/7/1909 – October 17, 1910.)
- ---. A Silveirinha. Rio de Janeiro: Francisco Alves, 1914. (Serialized in Jornal do Comércio, 1913.)
- Almeida, Filinto de, and Júlia Lopes de Almeida. A Casa Verde. São Paulo: Companhia Editora Nacional, 1932. (Serialized in Jornal do Commercio, 12/18/1898 – March 16, 1899.)
- ---. Pássaro Tonto (Dizzy Bird). São Paulo: Companhia Editora Nacional, 1934.

=== Short fiction ===
- Vieira, Adelina Lopes, and Júlia Lopes de. Contos Infantis. Lisbon: Companhia Editora, 1886.
- ---. Traços e Illuminuras. Lisbon: Typographia Castro & Irmão, 1887.
- ---. Ância Eterna. Rio de Janeiro: H. Garnier, 1903.
  - Revised edition: Rio de Janeiro: A Noite: 1938.
- ---. Histórias da Nossa Terra. Rio de Janeiro: Francisco Alves, 1907.
- ---. Era uma Vez.... Rio de Janeiro: Jacintho Ribeiro dos Santos, 1917.
- ---. A Isca. Rio de Janeiro: Leite Ribeiro: 1922.
  - Includes four novellas: A Isca, O Homen que Olha para Dentro, O Laço Azul, and O Dedo do Velho

=== Theater ===
- ---. A Herança. Rio de Janeiro: Typographia do Jornal do Commercio, 1909. (Performed at the Teatro de Exposição Nacional, 9/4/1908.)
- ---. Teatro. Porto: Renascença Portuguesa, 1917.
  - Includes: Quem Não Perdoa, Doidos de Amor, and Nos Jardins de Saul.

=== Other ===
- ---. Livro das Noivas. Rio de Janeiro: Publisher unnamed, 1896.
- ---. Livro das Donas e Donzellas. Rio de Janeiro: Francisco Alves, 1906.
- ---. Eles e Elas. Rio de Janeiro: Francisco Alves, 1910.
- ---. "Cenas e Paisagens do Espíritu Santo." Revistaa do Instituto Histórico e Geográfico Brasileiro 75 (1911): 177–217.
- Almeida, Júlia Lopes de, and Afonso Lopes de Almeida. A Árvore. Rio de Janeiro: Francisco Alves, 1916.
- ---. Jornadas no Meu País. Rio de Janeiro: Francisco Alves, 1920.
- ---. Jardim Florido, Jardinagem. Rio de Janeiro: Leite Ribeiro: 1922.
- ---. "Brasil – Conferência Pronunciada por la Autora en la Biblioteca del Consejo Nacional de Mujeres de la Argentina." Buenos Aires, 1922.
- ---. "Oração a Santa Dorotéia". Rio de Janeiro: Francisco Alves, 1923.
- ---. Maternidade. Rio de Janeiro: Olivia Herdy de Cabral Peixoto, 1925. (Serialized in Jornal do Commercio, 8/19/1924 – August 24, 1925.)
- ---. Oração à Bandeira. Rio de Janeiro: Olivia Herdy de Cabral Peixoto, 1925.
