= Adelaide Easley =

American research scientist (1902–1974)

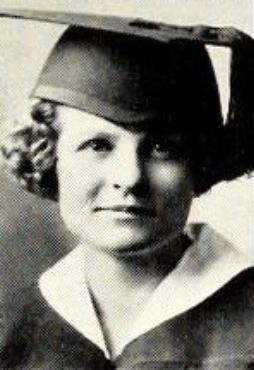
- Adelaide Easley, from the 1923-1924 yearbook of Colorado College
- Born: Mary Adelaide Easley; December 18, 1902; Colorado Springs, Colorado
- Died: October 8, 1974 (aged 71); Wichita, Kansas
- Occupation: Research scientist
- Employer: General Electric

Mary Adelaide Easley (December 18, 1902 – October 8, 1974) was an American research scientist who worked for General Electric in Ohio from 1928 to 1961, developing flashbulbs and strobe lighting for photography and the crystalline quartz spectrometer, among other projects.

== Early life and education ==
Easley was born in Colorado Springs, Colorado, the daughter of Ogden Hamilton Easley and Bessie Stagg Easley. Bessie Easley died in 1906, and Adelaide Easley was raised by her stepmother, Georgia Seabrook Hoss Easley, a former teacher. She graduated from Colorado College in 1924, and she earned a master's degree at Northwestern University in 1926.

== Career ==
Easley taught physics at Northwestern University from 1926 to 1928. In 1928, she began working for General Electric in Ohio, as a research physicist in the Lamp Development Laboratory, "one of the first women to enter the lamp research field", according to a 1948 profile. She especially worked on developing flashbulbs and strobe lighting for photography, and on the crystalline quartz spectrometer. She retired in 1961, in part because she needed time to care for her widowed stepmother.

== Publications ==
Much of Easley's published research was co-authored with William E. Forsythe, who was president of the Optical Society of America. She also contributed chapters to Willard D. Morgan's The Encyclopedia of Photography. Morgan wrote that he considered Easley one of the notable women in the photography field in the 1940s, for doing "such important research in the photo lamp laboratory at General Electric."

- "The Infra-Red Absorption Spectra of the Halogen Derivatives of Methane" (1928, with L. Fenner and B. J. Spence)
- "The Near Infra-Red Absorption Spectra of Some Halogen Derivatives of Ethane" (1929, with B. J. Spence)
- "Some Pecularities of the Spectrum of the Tungsten Mercury Arc" (1930, with W. E. Forsythe)
- "Characteristics of the General Electric Photoflash Lamp" (1931, with W. E. Forsythe)
- "A Falling Plate Flashometer" (1931, with W. E. Forsythe)
- "Characteristics of A New Ultraviolet Lamp" (1931, with W. E. Forsythe and B. T. Barnes)
- "A Method of Measuring the Maximum Intensity of Light from the Photoflash Lamps or from Other Sources of Short Duration" (1932, with W. E. Forsythe)
- "Ultraviolet Sources and Their Radiation" (1934, with W. E. Forsythe and B. T. Barnes)
- "Time Intensity Relation and Spectral Distribution of the Radiation of the Photo-Flash Lamps" (1934, with W. E. Forsythe)
- "Photographic Effectiveness of the Radiation from a Number of Photographic Sources" (1936, with W. E. Forsythe)
- "Time Constants of Incandescent Lamps" (1938, with W. E. Forsythe and D. D. Hinman)
- "Gas Temperatures and Elastic Losses in Low Pressure Mercury-Argon Discharges " (1951, with C. Kenty and B. T. Barnes)
- "Probe Technique for the Measurement of Electron Temperature" (1951)
- "Electron Temperature vs Noise Temperature in Low Pressure Mercury-Argon Discharges" (1951, with W. W. Mumford)

== Personal life ==
Easley lived with her stepmother in the 1940s and 1950s, until Georgie Easley died in 1962. Easley lived in a nursing home in Wichita, Kansas, in her later years. She died there in 1974, at the age of 71.
