= Mary Adelaide Walker =

English writer and illustrator

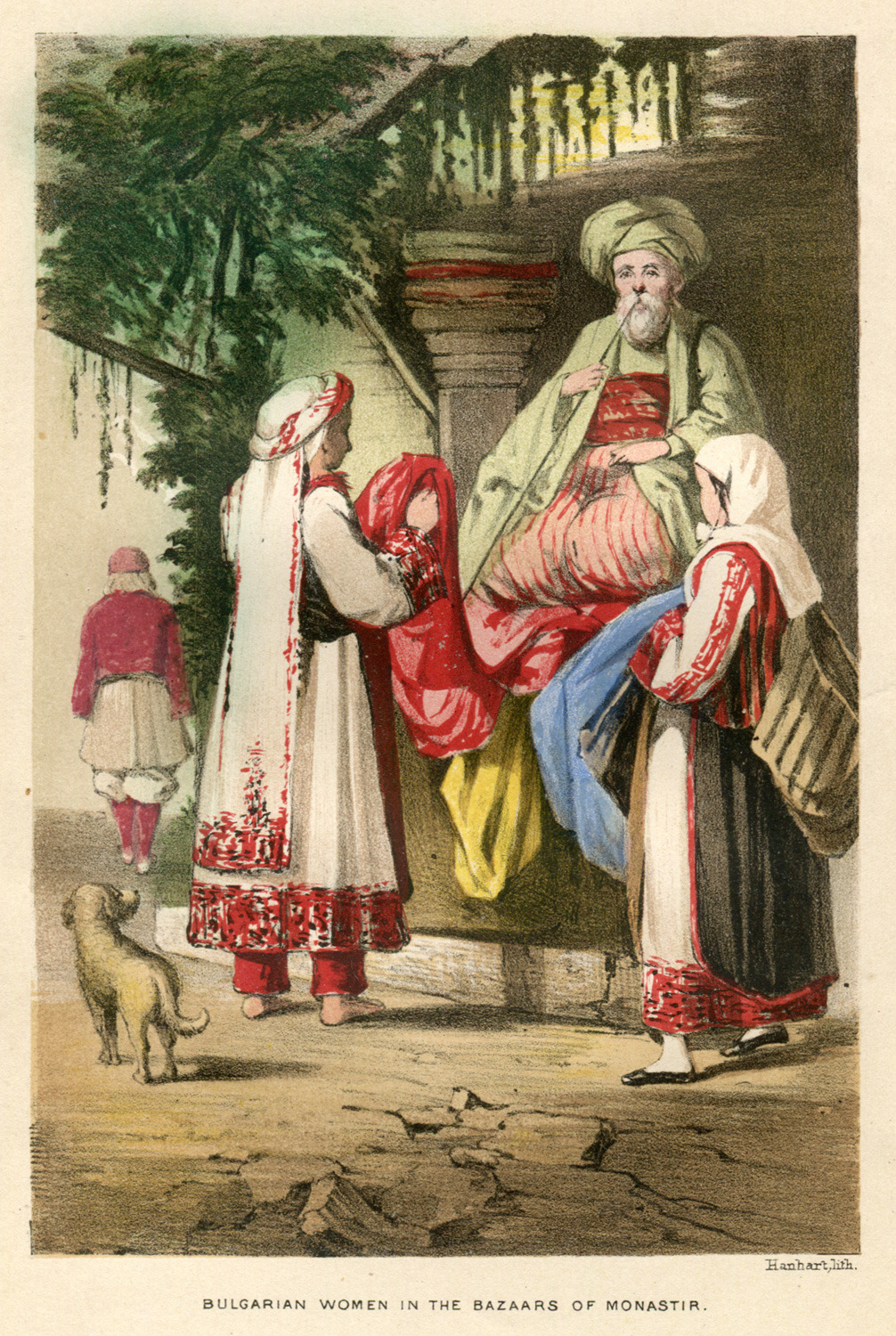
1864 Illustration titled "Bulgarian women in the bazaars of Montasir" by Mary Adelaide Walker

English writer Mary Adelaide Walker published four books detailing her travels in the Balkans during the second half of the nineteenth century. Her books provide detailed descriptions of Southeastern European and Western Asian cultures from her own perspective as an English traveler. Among the places she describes are Romania, Greece, Albania, Turkey, Bulgaria, and Macedonia. In her books, Walker also included original illustrations of the people and places she saw on her travels.

Some scholars estimate that she lived away from England for about 40 years after joining her brother, a British chaplain, in Istanbul in approximately 1856.

== List of works ==
- Eastern Life and Scenery, With Excursions in Asia Minor, Mytilene, Crete, and Roumania (1886; published in two volumes)
- Old Tracks and New Landmarks: Wayside Sketches in Crete, Macedonia, Mitylene, etc. (1897)
- Through Macedonia to the Albanian Lakes (1864)
- Untrodden Paths in Roumania (1888)
