= Azalea (given name) =

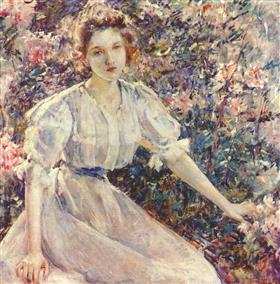
- Azaleas by Robert Lewis Reid.
- Gender: feminine

Origin
- Origin: Greek
- Meaning: flower name

Other names
- See also: Azélie, Zélie

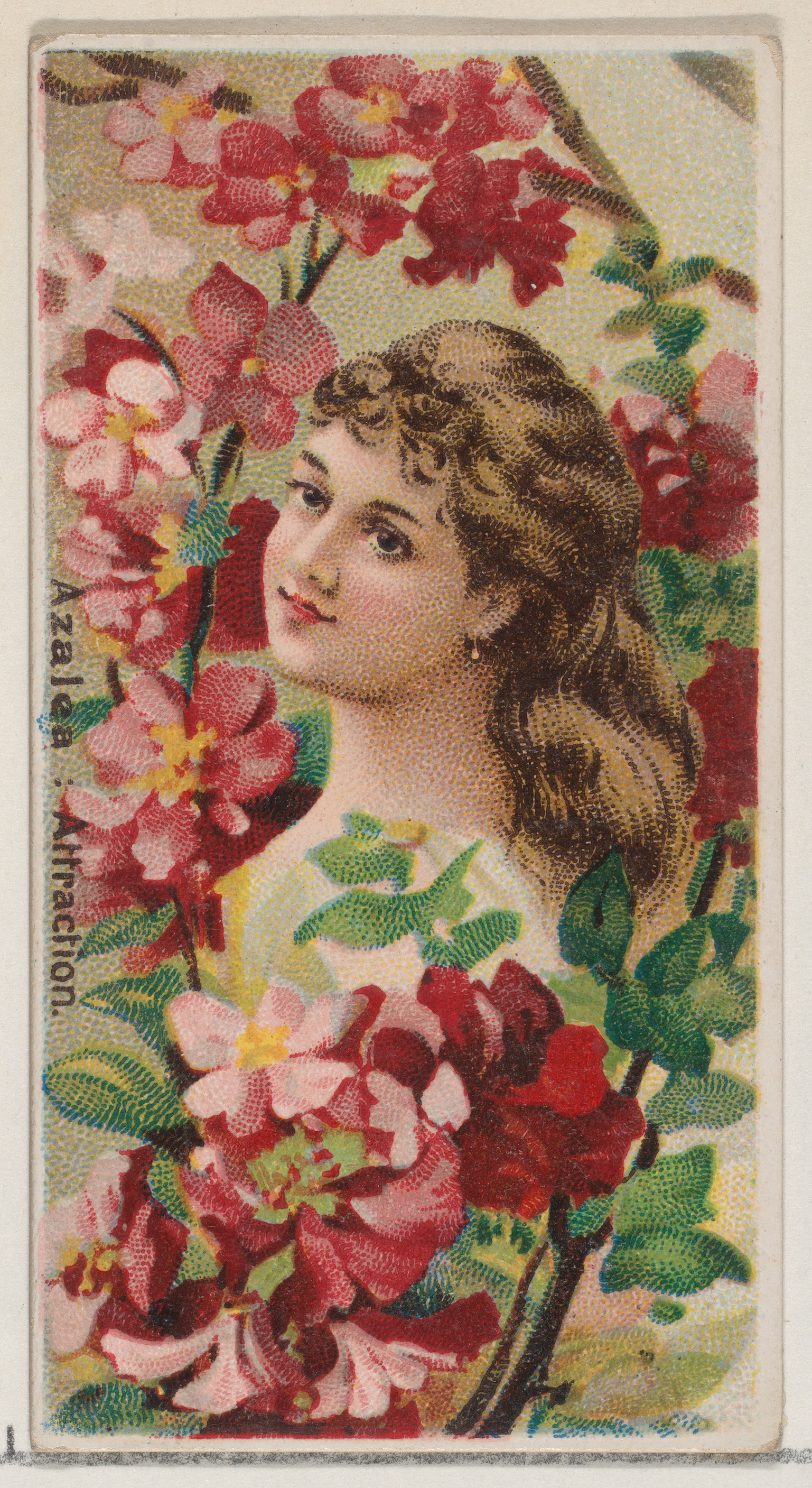
An azalea is said to signify attraction in the language of flowers.

Azalea is an English name taken from the flower name, which is derived from the Greek word azaleos, meaning dry.

== Popularity ==
The name was in occasional use by the early 1900s along with other plant and flower names that were then in vogue for girls, but was never common. The fame of the rapper Iggy Azalea drew attention to the name in the 2010s and it has been increasing in use for girls in recent years. The recent canonization of Roman Catholic saints Louis Martin and Marie-Azélie Guérin might also have inspired namesakes as Azélie and its short form Zélie are both sometimes considered French forms of the name. The name was among the one thousand most popular names for newborn girls in the United States for the first time in 2012. It has ranked among the top five hundred names for American girls since 2020.

Variants of the name also in use in the United States include: Azaela, Azaelia, Azala, Azalaya, Azalayah, Azaleah, Azaleia, Azalee, Azaleya, Azalia, Azaliah, Azalie, Azaliya, Azaliyah, Azalya, Azayla, Azaylah, Azaylea, Azaylee, Azaylia, Azayliah, Azealia, Azelea, Azelia, Azelie, Azella, Azelya, Azyla, and Azylah.

== Notable people ==
- Azealia Banks (born 1991), American rapper
- Helen Azalea “Poppy” Baring (1901–1980), British-American socialite
- Iggy Azalea, stage name of Amethyst Amelia Kelly (born 1990), Australian rapper
- Azalea Quiñones (born 1951), Venezuelan painter and poet
- Azalea Sinclair (born 1930), former New Zealand netball player
- Azalea Thorpe (1911–1988), Scottish-born American weaver and textile designer
