= Pépinières Arboretum Adeline =

Commercial nursery with arboretum in Centre-Val de Loire, France

Coordinates: 47°10′21″N 2°59′22″E

The Pépinières Arboretum Adeline (18 hectares) is a commercial nursery with arboretum located at 33 rue du Pont de la Batte, La Chapelle-Montlinard, Cher, Centre-Val de Loire, France. It is open weekdays without charge.

The nursery's arboretum has been recognized by the national collection of the Conservatoire des Collections Végétales Spécialisées (CCVS) for its collections of Ginkgo biloba (28 varieties) and Liquidambar (26 varieties). It also contains oaks (144 varieties), maples (110 varieties), Japanese maples (50 varieties), viburnums (50 varieties), magnolias (35 varieties), hawthorns (30 varieties), and lilacs (30 varieties), as well as Metasequoia, Picea, Sequoia, and Taxodium specimens.

== See also ==
- List of botanical gardens in France
