= Adelaide Hall (disambiguation) =

Adelaide Hall (1901–1993) was an American jazz singer.

Adelaide Hall may also refer to:

== People ==
- Adelaide S. Hall (1857-1924), American art connoisseur, curator, promoter, critic
- Adélaïde Victoire Hall (1772–1844), Swedish-French artist and noble

== Buildings ==
- Adelaide Town Hall, landmark building in Adelaide, South Australia, Australia
- Adelaide Trades Hall, building in Adelaide, South Australia, established in 1896
