= Adelaide Fischer =

20th-century American singer

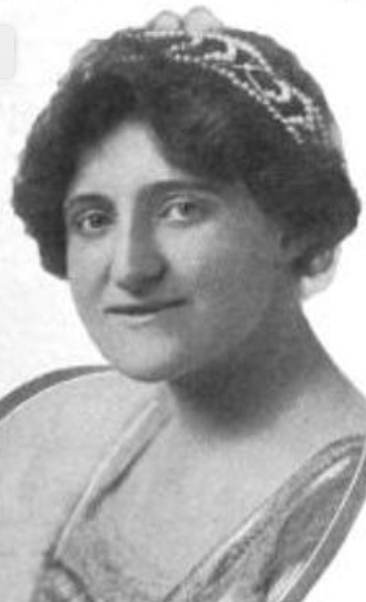
- Adelaide Fischer, from a 1915 publication
- Born: September 1889; Brooklyn, New York
- Died: Unknown
- Occupation: Soprano singer

Adelaide L. Fischer Federlein (born September 1889 – died after April 1950) was an American soprano singer, based in New York.

== Early life ==
Fischer was from Brooklyn, the daughter of Otto Fischer and Adelaide Freitag Fischer. Her brother, Otto L. Fischer, was a pianist, educator, composer who was based in Wichita, Kansas in adulthood.

== Career ==
Fischer, "a charming light soprano", sang in recitals and churches, mostly in the mid-1910s and 1920s, including appearances at New York's Aeolian Hall. In 1915, she joined Florence Hinkle and Inez Barbour Hadley as soprano soloists in a performance of a Mahler's Eighth Symphony with the Philadelphia Orchestra, conducted by Leopold Stokowski. She toured in the southern United States in 1918. During World War I she sang for the troops and gave benefit concerts, accompanied by her husband. In 1921, she gave a joint recital with Mario Laurenti at the Brooklyn Academy of Music.

Fischer made a number of recordings in 1914 and 1917, mostly for the Edison label. Linn Seiler and Karl Ino dedicated a song, "Butterflies" (1916), to Fischer.

She was a church soloist and taught music later in her life, in New York City.

== Personal life ==
Fischer married organist and composer Gottfried Harrison Federlein in 1918. They had a daughter, Norma Adelaide, born in 1919; they divorced in the 1920s, and he remarried. She lived with her brother in Brooklyn in her later years, and survived him when he died in 1950.
