= Lisa Mainiero =

American writer and academic

- Born: Lisa Adeline Mainiero; January 18, 1957 (age 69)

Academic background
- Education: Yale University (Ph.D., 1983)
- Thesis: Coping With Powerlessness: Power Balancing Strategies Employed by Men and Women Under Conditions of Related Dependency in Organizational Settings (1983)
- Doctoral advisor: J. Richard Hackman

Academic work
- Discipline: Management; Women's studies
- Institutions: Fairfield University Dolan School of Business

Lisa Adeline Mainiero (born January 18, 1957) is an American writer and academic in the field of management. Her career focuses on the careers of women and men, and workplace romance. Mainiero is one of the first researchers to investigate romance in the workplace, and crafted the Kaleidoscope Career Model (the KCM) with her co-author Sherry E. Sullivan.

== Education ==
Mainiero completed a doctorate in organizational behavior from Yale University. In 1983, Maniero completed her dissertation titled Coping With Powerlessness: Power Balancing Strategies Employed by Men and Women Under Conditions of Related Dependency in Organizational Settings. J. Richard Hackman was the chair of her dissertation committee along with members, Rosabeth Moss Kanter, and Martha Glenn Cox. She also worked with Victor Vroom on a pre-dissertation project.

== Career ==
Mainiero is a Full Professor of Management at Fairfield University Dolan School of Business. Her research focuses on women in management, career paths for women and men, gender and diversity, workplace romance, and sexual harassment issues. Mainiero is one of the first researchers to investigate romance in the workplace. She is also well known for her career model, the Kaleidoscope Career Model (the KCM), co-authored with Sherry E Sullivan, which describes the parameters of authenticity, balance, and challenge for women and for men as they move through their careers. She has appeared on Good Morning America, The Oprah Winfrey Show, CNN, Fox News with Neal Cavuto, Larry King Live and numerous other television talk shows and programs. She is frequently contacted by journalists all over the world for her expertise and has been noted as a source in The New York Times, USA Today, Time Magazine, Business Week, and many other publications. She served on the editorial board for the Academy of Management Perspectives journal and was division and program chair of the Woman in Management division, now the Gender and Diversity division of the Academy of Management.

== Selected works ==
=== Books ===
- Mainiero, Lisa (1989). Office Romance: Love, Power & Sex in the Workplace. Macmillan. ISBN 1501109677. OCLC 894026258.
- Mainiero, Lisa A.; Tromley, Cheryl L. (1994). Developing Managerial Skills in Organizational Behavior (2 ed.). Englewood Cliffs: Prentice Hall. ISBN 013226028X. OCLC 402350565.
- Brindle, Margaret; Mainiero, Lisa A. (2000). Managing Power Through Lateral Networking. Westport, Conn.: Quorum. ISBN 0585385807. OCLC 49569484.
- Mainiero, Lisa; Sullivan, Sherry E. (2006). The Opt-Out Revolt: Why People are Leaving Companies to Create Kaleidoscope Careers. Mountain View, Calif.: Davies-Black Pub. ISBN 9780891063322. OCLC 243598672.

=== Articles ===
- Mainiero, L. A. (1986). "Coping with Powerlessness: The Relationship of Gender and Job Dependency to Empowerment-Strategy Usage". Administrative Science Quarterly. 31 (4): 633–653. doi:10.2307/2392967. JSTOR 2392967.
- Mainiero, L.A. & Sullivan, S.E. (2005). "Kaleidoscope Careers: An Alternate Explanation for the 'Opt-Out' Revolution." The Academy of Management, 19(1), 106-123.
- Mainiero, L.A. & Jones, K.J. (2013). “Sexual Harassment Versus Workplace Romance: Social Media Spillover and Textual Harassment in the Workplace.” The Academy of Management Perspectives, 27(3), 1-17.
- Mainiero, L.A. & Gibson, D.E. (2017). "The Kaleidoscope Career Model Revisited: How Midcareer Men and Women Diverge on Authenticity, Balance and Challenge." Journal of Career Development, 45(4), 361-377. https://doi.org/10.1177/0894845317698223
- Mainiero, L.A. & Gibson, D.E. (2003). "Managing Employee Trauma: Dealing with the Emotional Fallout from 9-11." Academy of Management Executive, 17(3), 130-143.
- Mainiero, L.A. & Jones, K.J. (2012). “Developing a Communication Ethics Model to Address Potential Sexual Harassment from Inappropriate Social Media Contacts Between Coworkers.” Journal of Business Ethics, 114(2), 367-379. DOI 10.1007/s10551-012-1349-8
- Mainiero, L. A.; Williamson, A. P.; Robinson, G. S. (1994). "Getting Anointed for Advancement: The Case of Executive Women [and Executive Commentary]". The Academy of Management Executive. 8 (2): 53–67. doi:10.5465/ame.1994.9503101081. JSTOR 4165188.
- Mainiero, L. A. (1994). "On breaking the glass ceiling: The political seasoning of powerful women executives". Organizational Dynamics. 22 (4): 5–20. doi:10.1016/0090-2616(94)90075-2. ISSN 0090-2616.
