= Henri Le Riche =

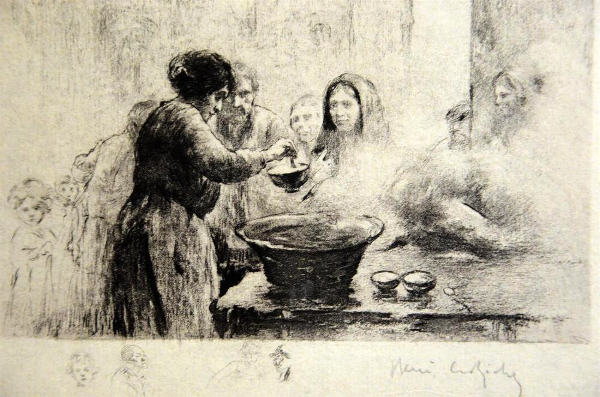
Morning Coffee

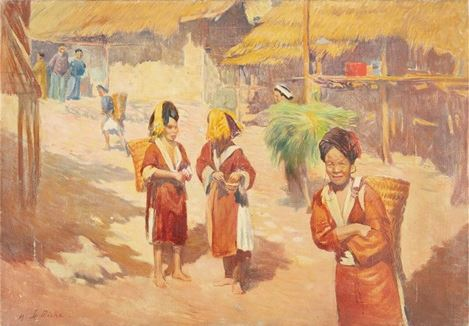
Illustration from L'Indo-Chine, by Claude Farrère

Henri Le Riche, also known as Hirné (12 April 1868, Grenoble - 26 March 1944, Neuilly-sur-Seine) was a French painter, sculptor, engraver and illustrator.

== Life and work ==
He studied with Eustache Bernard for three years, at the École supérieure d'Art de Grenoble. Then, in 1887, he enrolled at the École des Beaux-Arts in Paris, where his primary instructors were William Bouguereau and Tony Robert-Fleury (for painting), and Louis Pierre Henriquel-Dupont (for engraving).

In 1888, he won the Prix de Rome for engraving, and spent three years at the Villa Medici. Upon completing his studies there, he visited North Africa with one of his fellow students, the architect Albert Tournaire.

His first individual exhibit was at the Salon in 1894, but it was only in 1922 that he won his first silver medal. Some of his sculptures were signed with the name "Hirné".

In 1935, he was elected to the Académie des Beaux-Arts, where he took Seat #4 for engraving, succeeding Frédéric Laguillermie (deceased); serving as its President in 1943.

He illustrated works by Jean d'Esme, Claude Farrère, Arthur de Gobineau, and Charles Baudelaire, among many others. Some of his original plates may be seen at the Musée de Grenoble.

== Sources ==
- Marcus Osterwalder (Ed.), Dictionnaire des illustrateurs, 1890-1945, Éditions Ides et Calendes, 2001, pg.690 ISBN 978-0-7859-8038-4
- Biographical data and references from the Comité des travaux historiques et scientifiques @ La France Savante
