= Sweet Adeline =

Sweet Adeline may refer to:

- "Sweet Adeline" (song), a 1903 ballad best known as a barbershop standard
- Sweet Adeline (musical), a 1929 Broadway musical by Jerome Kern and Oscar Hammerstein II
- Sweet Adeline (1934 film), a Warner Brothers film based on the Broadway musical
- Sweet Adeline (1926 film), starring Charles Ray
- "Sweet Adeline", a song by Elliott Smith from his album XO

== See also ==
- Sweet Adelines International, a worldwide organization of women singers of barbershop harmony
