= Marie-Adélaïde Baubry-Vaillant =

French painter

Adélaïde-Marie Baubry-Vaillant
- Born: Adélaïde-Marie Baubry; 7 April 1827; Paris, France
- Died: 5 July 1899 (aged 72)

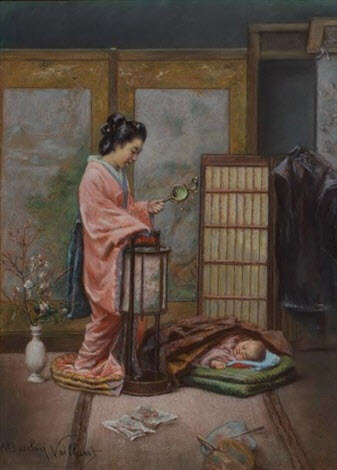

Marie–Adélaïde Baubry Vaillant (née Baubry; 7 April 1827 – 5 July 1899) was a French painter. She was born in Paris and was a pupil of Joseph Nicolas Robert-Fleury and Alphonse Louis Galbrund. She married Jean-Baptiste Vaillant.
