= USS Azalea (1864) =

Gunboat of the United States Navy

History

United States
- Laid down: date unknown
- Launched: 1864
- Acquired: 31 March 1864
- Commissioned: 7 June 1864
- Decommissioned: 13 July 1865
- Stricken: 1865 (est.)
- Fate: Sold, 10 August 1865

General characteristics
- Displacement: 176 tons
- Length: 110 ft (34 m)
- Beam: 21 ft 6 in (6.55 m)
- Draught: depth of hold 8 ft 3 in (2.51 m); draft 10 ft (3.0 m)
- Propulsion: steam engine; screw-propelled
- Speed: 10 knots
- Complement: 42
- Armament: one 30-pounder Parrott rifle; one 20-pounder Dahlgren rifle

USS Azalea was a steamer acquired by the Union Navy during the American Civil War. She was used by the Union Navy as an armed tugboat in support of the Union Navy blockade of Confederate waterways.

== Azalea constructed in Boston in 1864 ==
Azalea—a wooden-hulled, screw tug built at Boston, Massachusetts, by McKay and Aldus—was purchased by the Union Navy upon her completion on 31 March 1864. After her fitting out at the Boston Navy Yard, the tug was placed in commission on 7 June 1864.

== Assigned to the South Atlantic blockade ==
Assigned to the South Atlantic Blockading Squadron, the new tug arrived off the bar outside Charleston, South Carolina, on 17 June 1864 and immediately took station in the outer cordon of Union warships striving to seal off that major port which, as the birthplace of secession, held great symbolic significance for the Confederacy in addition to its substantial strategic value.

=== Assisting in the capture of runner Pocahontas ===
The highlight of this duty—which she performed until March 1865—came half an hour before midnight on 8 July 1864 when her boats joined those of the tug Sweet Brier in boarding and taking possession of the blockade-running ". . . schooner Pocahontas, of and from Charleston, South Carolina, bound to Nassau, New Providence . . ."with a cargo of cotton and tobacco.

From time to time during her ensuing months off Charleston, Azalea had brushes with blockade runners which were attempting to enter or leave port, but she did not score again before she retired to Port Royal, South Carolina, just before the arrival of spring. When this work had been completed, late in March 1865, she headed for waters near Savannah, Georgia, and was on duty in Ossabaw Sound by 1 April.

=== Preventing the escape of Confederate political leaders ===
By this time, the Confederacy was collapsing. General Robert E. Lee's army evacuated Richmond, Virginia, and Confederate President Jefferson Davis and his cabinet retired into the Deep South in the hope of continuing the struggle. However, Lee surrendered the Army of Northern Virginia on the 9th and General Joseph E. Johnston realized that his army, the only significant body of Confederate troops left in the field, could not prevail.

On the 25th, Gen. William Tecumseh Sherman informed Rear Admiral John A. Dahlgren that he expected General Johnston to surrender the next day and asked the commander of the South Atlantic Blockading Squadron to ". . . watch the east coast and send word round to the west coast ..." lest Davis and his cabinet escape to Cuba.

Azalea was one of the nine steamers that Dahlgren promptly sent to sea to intercept the former Southern chief of state. However, Union cavalrymen captured Jefferson Davis at Irwinville, Georgia, on 10 May; and Azalea returned to Port Royal 15 May.

=== Azalea captures British brig Sarah M. Newall ===
Nevertheless, the war was not yet quite over for the tug. On 23 May, she seized Sarah M. Newall while that British hermaphrodite brig was attempting to run through the blockade into Savannah, Georgia.

== Post-war decommissioning, sale, and subsequent maritime career ==
Azalea continued blockade duty into June and, by mid-month, was back at Port Royal receiving repairs. She got underway north on 27 June and was decommissioned on 13 July 1865. Sold at auction at Philadelphia, Pennsylvania, to Samuel C. Cook on 10 August 1865, the tug was redocumented as Tecumseh on 6 October 1865. Operating, at least originally, out of Boston, Massachusetts, she remained in documentation until 1890.
