= Adelina Nicholls =

Mexican-American human rights activist

- Born: Mexico
- Education: National Autonomous University of Mexico
- Organization: Georgia Latino Alliance for Human Rights
- Known for: Immigration activism

Adelina Nicholls is a sociologist and one of the co-founders of the Georgia Latino Alliance for Human Rights (GLAHR). She advocates and protests for the protection and extension of rights for immigrants in America, with particular focus on those from Latin American countries. She marched in Atlanta, Georgia in protest against an immigration reform law, HB 87 in 2011. In addition to being opposed by Nicholls and GLAHR, the law was also protested by the Mexican government. She has also marched to the Immigration and Customs Enforcement (ICE) building in Atlanta.

She has collaborated with the National Day Laborer Organizing Network. She has worked with the activists and police officers in Warner Robins, Perry City, Athens, Doraville, Forest Park, Fairburn, and Albany.

She attended the National Autonomous University of Mexico. She was a teacher in rural México before moving to the United States where she became a community organizer.
