= Adaline =

Adaline may refer to:

== Film ==
- The Age of Adaline, a 2015 film, alternative working title Adaline

== Places ==
- Adaline, West Virginia
- Adaline Hornbek Homestead, known as Hornbek House, Colorado, U.S.

== People ==
- Adaline Hohf Beery (1859–1929), American writer
- Adaline Glasheen (1920–1993), author and scholar
- Adaline Kent (1900–1957), sculptor
- Adaline Shepherd (1883–1950), composer
- Adaline Emerson Thompson (1859-1951), American educational worker and reformer
- Adaline Weston Couzins (1815–1892), suffragist, American Civil War nurse
- Adaline, musician

== Other uses ==
- ADALINE, an artificial neural network
