= Adelina Lopes Vieira =

Brazilian writer, poet, and teacher

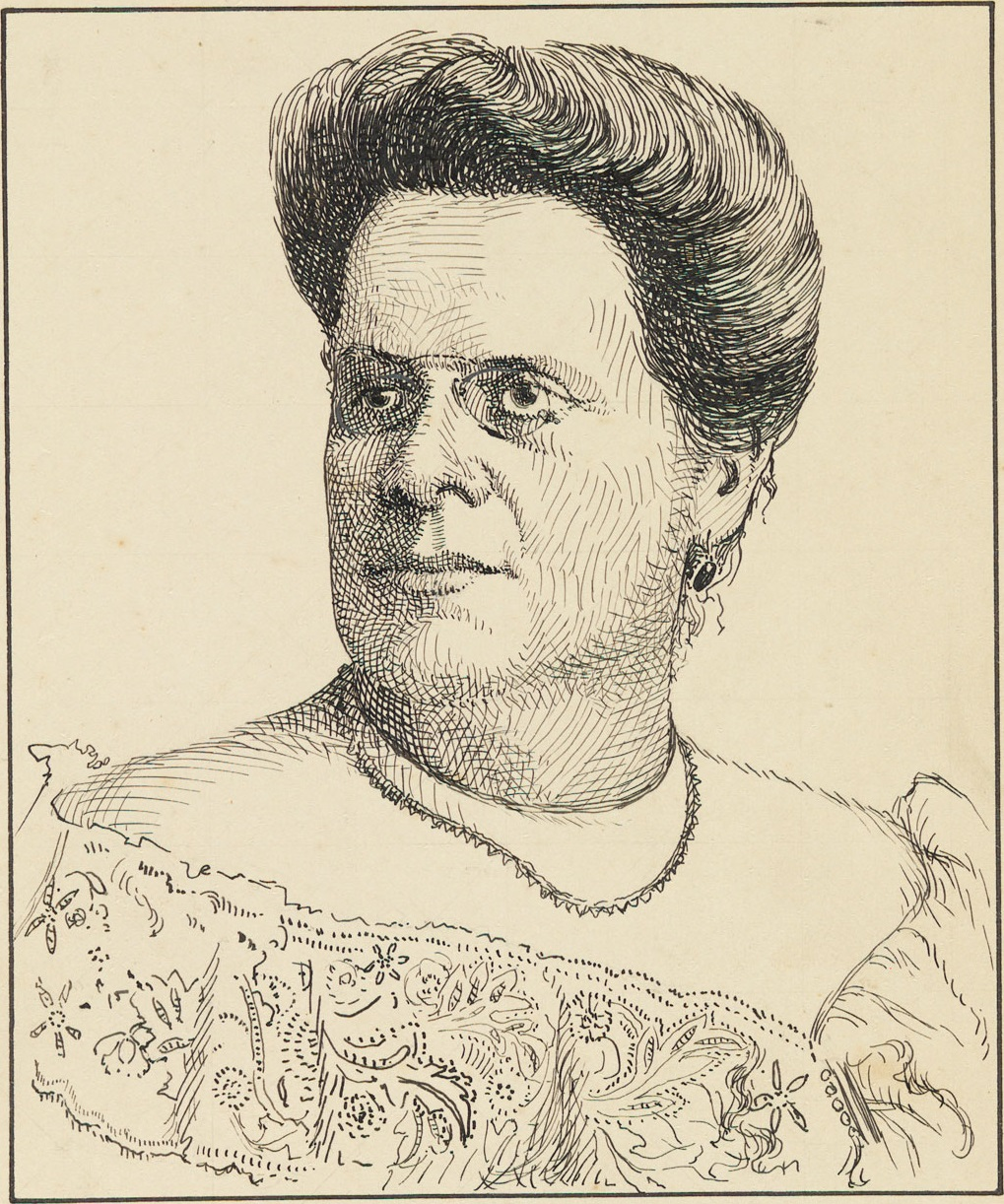
Adelina Amélia Lopes Vieira (1850 – 1922 or 1933)

Adelina Amélia Lopes Vieira (1850 – 1922 or 1933) was a Brazilian poet, playwright and children's writer.

== Life ==
Born in Lisbon, she came to Brazil as a young child, and graduated as a teacher around 1870. Contos Infantis (1886) was written with her sister Julia Lopes de Almeida. In 1899 she contributed to A Mensageira, a literary magazine edited by Presciliana Duarte de Almeida which was aimed at Brazilian women. At the start of the twentieth century she wrote and translated several plays.

== Works ==
- Saudade de palmeiras e No echo das damas, 1879
- Margaritas, 1879
- (with Julia Lopes de Almeida) Contos Infantis [Children's Tales], 1886.
- Destinos, 1890
- A viagem de Murilo
- As duas doses
- Expiação
- (trans.) A terrina by Ernest d’Hervilly, 1907
