= Adelina Dematti de Alaye =

Argentine human rights activist (1927–2016)

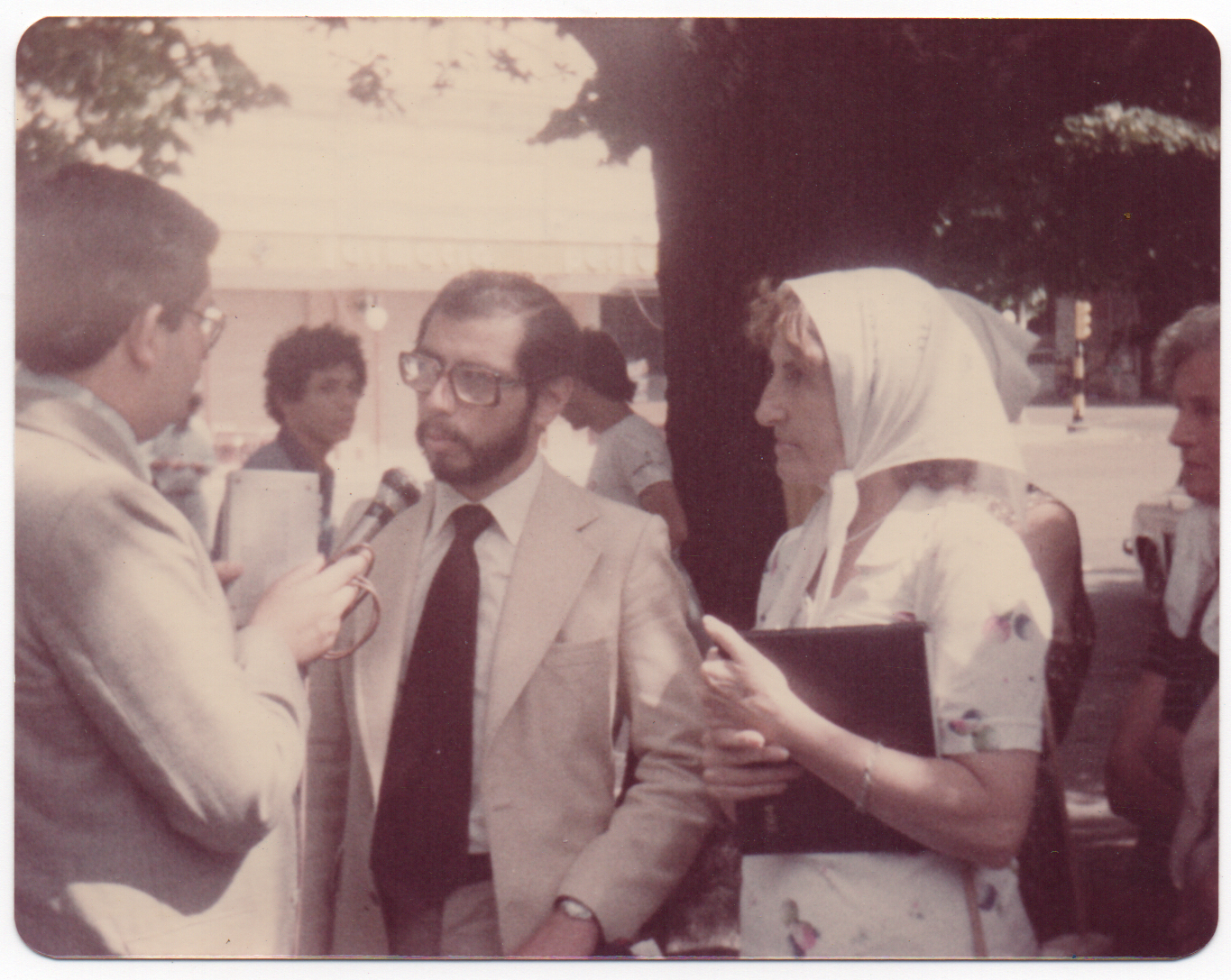
- Alaye (far right) in conversation with a journalist, 1984
- Born: June 5, 1927; Chivilcoy, Buenos Aires, Argentina
- Died: May 24, 2016 (aged 88); La Plata, Buenos Aires, Argentina
- Occupations: Activist, photographer
- Known for: Co-founder of Mothers of the Plaza de Mayo

Adelina Ethel Dematti de Alaye (June 5, 1927 – May 24, 2016) was an Argentine human rights activist who co-founded the Mothers of the Plaza de Mayo, an organization of mothers whose children disappeared during the Dirty War of the 1970s and early 1980s. She became known as "la madre fotógrafa," or "the mother photographer," for her documentation of the Argentine dictatorship and the Mothers of the Plaza de Mayo through her photography. Her collection was later declared a "Memory of the World" by UNESCO. In addition to her work with the Mothers of the Plaza de Mayo, Dematti was also active within the Permanent Assembly for Human Rights (APDH).

== Biography ==
Dematti was a native of Chivilcoy, Buenos Aires Province, where she was born in 1927. She lived in Carhué, Azul, and Brandsen before moving to La Plata with her family.

Her 21-year-old son, Carlos Esteban, was kidnapped on May 5, 1977, while riding his bicycle in the Ensenada neighborhood of Buenos Aires during the Dirty War. The kidnappers, dressed in civilian clothing, were recognized as members of the Argentine Navy. Her son's disappearance led to her involvement with the Mothers of the Plaza de Mayo. Later on, she was engaged in Madres de Plaza de Mayo Línea Fundadora.

In 2009, the National University of La Plata awarded Dematti an honorary doctorate for her activism on behalf of human rights. She was also honored as an illustrious citizen by the cities of Chivilcoy and La Plata.

Adelina Dematti de Alaye died in La Plata, Buenos Aires Province, on May 24, 2016, at the age of 88.

== Works ==
- La marca de la infamia. Asesinatos, complicidad e inhumaciones en el cementerio de La Plata [The Mark of Infamy: Murders, Complicity, and Burials in the La Plata Cemetery]. Ministerio de Justicia y Derechos Humanos de la Nación. 2014. ISBN 978-987-3720-03-1.
