= Adelaide Hawkins =

American cryptologist (1914–2008)

- Born: Mulheran; March 6, 1914.
- Died: July 10, 2008 (aged 94)
- Occupation: Cryptologist
- Known for: Managed the Office of Strategic Services’ message center in Washington DC, specializing in secret codes, or ciphers

Adelaide Hawkins (née Mulheran) (March 6, 1914- July 10, 2008) was a cryptologist at the Office of Strategic Services (OSS) during World War II and the Central Intelligence Agency (CIA) during the Cold War Era.

== Biography ==
Hawkins was born in Wheeling, West Virginia. Her father was a machinist, but his work was not enough to support the family, so she lived with an aunt to ease financial strain. One year after graduating high school, Hawkins married Ed Hawkins. The couple had three children.

Ed Hawkins worked for the Army Signal Corps Reserves and was assigned in Washington, D.C., where he began studying cryptography and cryptanalysis for the signal intelligence group's extension program. Hawkins joined her husband in his training after she became interested with the work of the crypto analysis community in Washington.

== Career ==
When a new unit was being set up at her husband's workplace, she was asked to join as the coordinator of information. Her first briefing was given by James Roosevelt, son of President Franklin Delano Roosevelt.

Beginning in December 1941, Hawkins managed the agency's message center in Washington DC, specializing in secret codes, or ciphers. In March 1942, she was approved to become a Junior Cryptanalyst in the Office of Coordinator of Information. She helped train spies working behind enemy lines in communications. She went on to work with the CIA. At one point during her time at the CIA, she became acting Chief of the Branch of Cryptology. However, she was only promoted to this position because they were holding it for someone more qualified. She was a member of the “petticoat panel,” an effort by the CIA in 1953 to “to study the problems of professional and clerical advancement to determine…whether they believe there is any discrimination as such against women for advancing professionally.”

Many of Hawkins' documents and reports from her time at the CIA are included in the declassified CIA database titled "From Typist to Trailblazer: The Evolving View of Women in the CIA's Workforce."
