= Adelaide Day Rollston =

American poet and author (1854–1941)

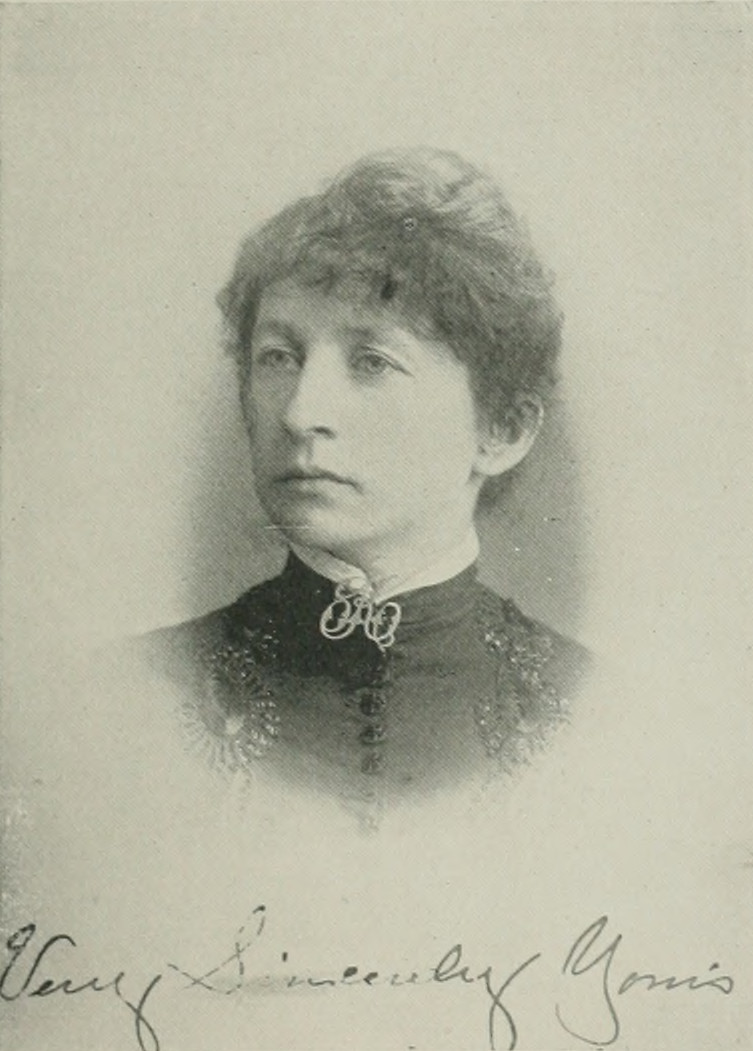
- "A Woman of the Century"
- Born: Adelaide Day Kidd; February 23, 1854 near Paducah, Kentucky, U.S.
- Died: January 7, 1941 (aged 86); Paducah, Kentucky
- Resting place: Oak Grove Cemetery, Paducah, Kentucky
- Occupations: poet; author
- Spouse: Joseph L. Rollston (m. 1874; died 1931)
- Children: 4
- Writing career
- Language: English
- Genres: novelette; periodical literature; poetry

Adelaide Day Rollston (née, Kidd; February 23, 1854 – January 7, 1941) was an American poet and author. Born near Paducah, Kentucky, she began writing verse at the age of 12, with her earliest poems appearing in the local press. Although her writing career involved early struggles, she later gained wide recognition as a contributor to major eastern periodicals, including Once a Week and Godey's Lady's Book. Rollston also authored several novelettes and published notable poems such as "One Woman's Story" and "His Second Wife."

== Early life and education ==
Adelaide Day Kidd was born near Paducah, Kentucky, February 23, 1854. Her earliest years were spent in the countryside. Her parents were, William Henry Kidd (1819–1864), a physician of good standing, and Elvira (Roberts) Kidd (1823–1895). Her siblings were, Sarah, Mary Marcellus, Cincinnatus, Eliza, Fannie, Edmonia, William, and John.

At the age of 12, her talent for writing verse began to manifest itself in brief poems published in the local press. Later, several appeared in the Saturday Star-Journal, of New York City. After the family moved to Paducah when Adelaide was 12 years old, she was educated in that city's St Mary's Academy.

== Career ==
After completing her education, Rollston continued her contributions to the neighboring press, and frequently verses over her name appeared in The Courier-Journal of Louisville, Kentucky. They attracted little or no attention, until she found a friend and helper in the veteran of the Kentucky press, Col. H. M. McCarty, who provided her with critical review of her work. Still, her writing career was a struggle. In 1877, she began to contribute to the Current, and later received wide recognition as a contributor to Once a Week, The Youth's Companion, Godey's Lady's Book, and other eastern periodicals. She also wrote several novelettes. Her poems of note included, "His Second Wife", "One Woman's Story", "A Fragment", "If I Had Known", and "The Wanderers".

== Death ==
In December 1874, in Massac County, Illinois, she married Joseph L. Rollston (1850–1931). They had four children, Guy, Vera, Ina, and Edward.

Adelaide Day Rollston died at her home in Paducah, Kentucky January 7, 1941. Burial was in the city's Oak Grove Cemetery.
