= Adelina Zandrino =

Italian artist and illustrator (1893–1994)

- Born: 1893
- Died: 1994 (aged 100–101)
- Known for: Painting
- Movement: Art Nouveau

Adelina Zandrino (19 September 1893 – 1994) was an Italian artist and illustrator. She was encouraged by the Mostra Internazionale d'Arte Femminile of 1913 to take up a career in the arts.

In 1913, Zandrino went to Paris with her father, Francesco Maria Zandrino, a journalist and theatre critic. While there she met such figures as Auguste Rodin and Gabriele D'Annunzio, through her father. She produced illustrations for the manuscript of D'Annunzio's Canzone del Sangue.

During the war, Zandrino carried out some propaganda illustration work. In 1917 she created a famous series of postcards, featuring illustrations of women. She continued with similar work during the 1920s and 1930s, also producing posters in the same Art Nouveau style; some of her work was in an erotic vein. Her posters included advertisements for tennis tournaments and sportswear.
