= Adelina Gutiérrez =

- Carmen Adelina Gutiérrez Alonso
- Adelina Gutiérrez
- Born: Carmen Adelina Gutiérrez Alonso; May 27, 1925; Santiago, Chile
- Died: April 11, 2015 (aged 89); Santiago, Chile
- Education: University of Chile; Indiana University Bloomington
- Occupations: Astrophysicist; professor
- Spouse: Hugo Moreno León (m. 1951–2000)
- Parents: Ramón Gutiérrez (father); Carmen Alonso (mother)

Carmen Adelina Gutiérrez Alonso (aka Adelina Gutiérrez, 27 May 1925 – 11 April 2015) was a Chilean scientist, academic and professor of astrophysics. She was the first Chilean to obtain a doctoral degree in astrophysics and the first woman to become a member of the Chilean Academy of Sciences.

== Biography ==
Carmen Adelina Gutiérrez Alonso, was born on 27 May 1925, in Santiago, Chile. She was the daughter of Ramón Gutiérrez and Carmen Alonso. Gutiérrez studied at the Liceo Maria Auxiliadora de Santiago, from which she graduated in 1942. Later, she began pursuing a career as a physics and mathematics teacher by studying at the Pedagogical Institute of the University of Chile, from which she graduated as a state-approved teacher in 1948. While Gutiérrez was studying at the university, she met the scientist Hugo Moreno León, whom she married in 1951 and with whom she had three children.

Gutiérrez began working as a science teacher at the Liceo Dario Salas and the Faculty of Physical and Mathematical Sciences (FCFM) of the University of Chile. From 1 June 1949, Gutiérrez worked at National Astronomical Observatory of Chile. At that observatory, her work was initially restricted to analyzing astronomical data obtained by other scientists. While working there, Gutiérrez developed an interest in the photoelectric photometry of austral stars, a subject which she addressed in numerous publications. During the time that she was working at the National Astronomical Observatory, Gutiérrez also became a full faculty member in Faculty of Physical and Mathematical Sciences of the University of Chile.

In the late 1950s, Gutiérrez traveled to the United States to study for a PhD in astrophysics, which she obtained in June 1964, becoming the first Chilean to obtain such a degree. In 1965, after having returned to Chile, Gutiérrez, Hugo Moreno León and Claudio Anguita founded a bachelor's degree course in astronomy at the University of Chile. Gutiérrez was responsible for overseeing the course. In 1976, Gutiérrez also founded a master's degree course in astronomy at the University of Chile.

In 1967, Gutiérrez began working with Hugo Moreno León in the newly opened Cerro Tololo Observatory. That same year she was named a full member of the Chilean Academy of Sciences Institute. She was the first woman and the first astronomer to join that select group of scientists.

Adelina Gutiérrez died on 11 April 2015.

== Tribute ==
On 27 May 2020, Google celebrated her 95th birthday with a Google Doodle.

== Works ==
English title	Original title	Years	Ref.
Astronomical Measurements Made with Theodolite	Determinaciones astronómicas realizadas con teodolito	1953	
The Accuracy of Extinction Determinations		1966	Department of Astronomy, Faculty of Physical and Mathematical Sciences (FCFM), University of Chile
A System of Photometric Standards		1966	Santiago de Chile
The Atmospheric Extinction at Cerro Tololo		1967	Department of Astronomy, FCFM, University of Chile
Spectrophotometric Parameters of Early-Type Stars		1968	FCFM, University of Chile
A Photometric Investigation of the Scorpio-Centaurus Association		1968	University of Chicago Press
Watching the Stars: Development of the Techniques of Astrophysics	Observando los astros: desarrollo de las técnicas de astrofísica	1978	
The Sun	El sol	1978	
General Astrophysics	Astrofísica general	1980	with Hugo Moreno
Low Dispersion Spectrophotometry of Late-Type Stars		1982	Santiago de Chile: Observatorio Astronomico Nacional
