= Adelaide Dutcher =

American physician and public health worker

- Education: Johns Hopkins School of Medicine (M.D.)
- Scientific career
- Fields: Medicine

Adelaide Dutcher (fl. 1901) was an American physician and public health worker who was the first American to stress the social origins of tuberculosis.

== Life ==
When Adelaide Dutcher was a student in the Johns Hopkins School of Medicine, she worked with William Osler, head of the department of medicine, on a research project to study the environmental causes of tuberculosis. During this study, she interviewed 190 outpatients, both white and black, who lived in the slums of Baltimore, Maryland, and were so poor that they needed to work regardless of their health. "Dutcher identified the elemental problems: crowding, filth, darkness, lack of ventilation, appalling ignorance of the contagiousness of tuberculosis, and carelessness with infectious materials. She thought that education could correct many of the sanitary deficiencies of the poor" and published her conclusions in Where the Danger Lies in Tuberculosis that appeared in the Philadelphia Medical Journal in 1900. In the article she urged the formation of an educational campaign about the nature and prevention of tuberculosis and stressed that housing represented a primary source of infection. She reported that many patients stated they became ill only after moving into quarters known to have been occupied previously by victims of the disease. Nothing is known of her further life.
