= Adelina Chilica =

Angolan politician

Adelina Chilica is an Angolan politician for the MPLA and a member of the National Assembly of Angola.
