= Adelaide Thompson Spurgeon =

American nurse and philanthropist (c.1826–1907)

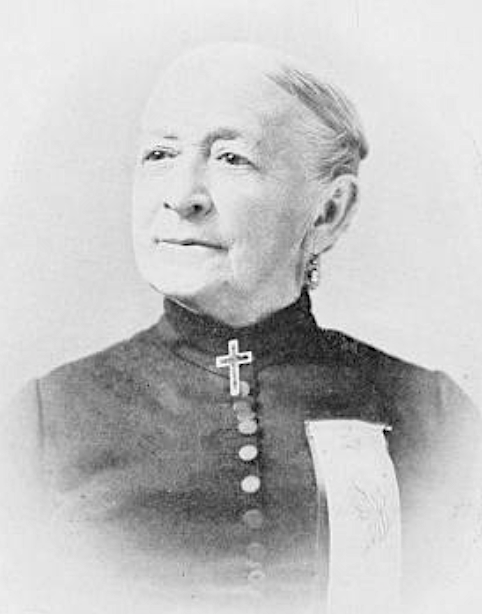
- Adelaide Thompson Spurgeon, from an 1895 publication
- Born: Adelaide E. Thompson; New York
- Died: March 4, 1907; Washington, D.C.
- Other name: Ada Spurgeon
- Occupations: Nurse during American Civil War, philanthropist

Adelaide Elizabeth Thompson Spurgeon (born about 1826 – died March 4, 1907) was a nurse during the American Civil War, and a philanthropist in Washington, D.C.

== Early life ==
Adelaide Elizabeth Thompson was born in England about 1826. She lived in New York before moving to Washington, D.C. in 1861.

== Career ==
In May 1861, began volunteering as a nurse and cook at a smallpox hospital in Washington, D.C. She collected donations for the hospital from New York friends. When she became ill herself, she had to resign from the hospital, but she continued as a "secret service" agent at the provost general's headquarters. She told of interviewing two young women who enlisted in disguise, "They both wept bitterly, not only at the disgrace [of being discovered], but at being obliged to return to their homes, leaving their loved ones, perhaps never to see them again." She later petitioned Congress for compensation for her wartime service, and was granted a pension in 1890, when the Senate committee found her to be "very clearly ... a meritorious case".

Later in life, Spurgeon took an interest in the lives in children in Washington, D.C., and the work of the city's Church of the Epiphany. She sponsored about 150 baptisms at the church in the 1880s. In the 1880s and 1890s, she served as a missionary at the city's Freedmen's Hospital, helping patients find homes after discharge.

== Personal life ==
Adelaide Thompson married a soldier from New York, Thaddeus C. Spurgeon, in 1863. They had a daughter, Ella Virginia Spurgeon (later Neely). Spurgeon was widowed when her husband died in 1897, and she died in 1907, in Washington. Her grave is in Arlington National Cemetery, with the inscription "Adelaide E. Spurgeon, Army Nurse". Her death was one of seven marked in August 1907 at the annual convention of the Army Nurses of the Civil War.
