= List of storms named Adeline =

The name Adeline has been used for two tropical cyclones in the Australian region:

- Cyclone Adeline (1973) – which formed in the Gulf of Carpentaria and made landfall in the easternmost part of the Northern Territory
- Cyclone Adeline (2005) – which formed near the Cocos Islands and churned in the open ocean; renamed Juliet when it moved west of 90°E

== See also ==
- Tropical Storm Adelinina (1988) – a South-West Indian Ocean tropical cyclone with a similar name
