= T. Adelaide Goodno =

American suffragist, temperance activist (1858–1931)

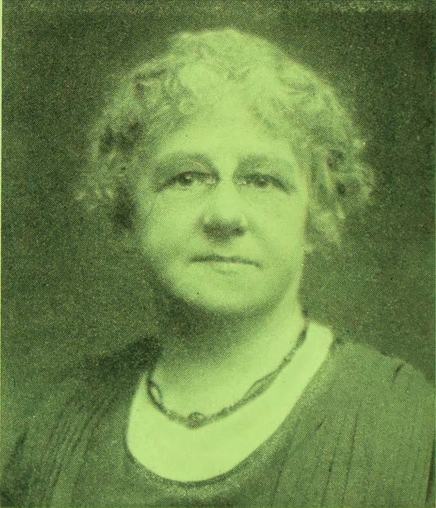
- Born: Therese Adelaide Hansbury; January 3, 1858; Philadelphia, Pennsylvania, U.S.
- Died: July 9, 1931; Greensboro, North Carolina, U.S.
- Occupation: Social reformer
- Title: President, North Carolina Woman's Christian Temperance Union
- Term: 1911-24
- Movement: temperance; women's suffrage
- Spouse: Charles F. Goodno (m. 1882)
- Children: 3

T. Adelaide Goodno (née Hansbury; January 3, 1858 – July 9, 1931) was an American social reformer associated with the suffrage and a temperance movements. She served as president of the North Carolina Woman's Christian Temperance Union (WCTU).

== Biography ==
Therese Adelaide Hansbury was born in Philadelphia, Pennsylvania, January 3, 1858.

She was educated in the public schools of that city.

After her graduation, in 1877, she served as a teacher until 1882. In that year, she married Dr. Charles F. Goodno, a Philadelphia physician. In that city, she became identified with the WCTU, and served for a time as president of the Belmont local Union. In 1892, the failing health of her husband led to a change of residence, and the home was established at Tyrone, Pennsylvania, where Goodno again took up temperance work, and served for several years as president of the local Union.

In 1903, she located at Raleigh, North Carolina, where she at once identified herself with temperance work. In 1905, she was appointed State Superintendent of Medical Temperance. From 1911 to 1924, she was president of the North Carolina WCTU. In 1925, she was corresponding secretary of the same Union. Goodno's leadership was instrumental in the educational work and the progressive legislation of that era.

Goodno also supported women's suffrage. In February 1915, with Anna Howard Shaw and others, Goodno was a speaker before the joint committees of the House and Senate, pleading the cause of equal suffrage.

T. Adelaide Goodno died in Greensboro, North Carolina, July 9, 1931.
