= Adelina Covián =

Spanish painter

- Born: Oviedo, Asturias, Spain
- Known for: Painting

Adelina Covián (born Oviedo) is a Spanish painter whose brightly colored landscapes reflect a message of love and optimism. Her first exhibition took place in Madrid in 1964. Since then she has had solo exhibitions in San Sebastián, Barcelona, Torremolinos, Paris, and Gijón, and has contributed to collective exhibitions in Spain and abroad.
