= William E. Forsythe =

American physicist

- Born: August 22, 1881; Blue Rock, Muskingum County, Ohio, United States
- Died: June 30, 1969 (aged 87); Cleveland, Ohio, United States
- Education: Denison University, University of Wisconsin
- Scientific career
- Fields: Physics

William Elmer Forsythe (August 22, 1881 — June 30, 1969) was an American physicist and president of the Optical Society of America.

Forsythe received his bachelor's degree from Denison University and went on to obtain a Master's and PhD at the University of Wisconsin. He was awarded the honorary degree of doctor of science from Kenyon College in 1926. In 1924 he was appointed director of the NELA Research Laboratory in Cleveland, Ohio. During World War II he was associated with the Office of Scientific Research and Development as well as the National Defense Research Committee. He was elected member emeritus and fellow of the Illuminating Engineering Society. He served as president of the Optical Society of America from 1926 to 1927.

He died on June 30, 1969.

== See also ==
- The Optical Society
