= Mary Adelaide Dickey =

American vaudeville performer (1882–1960)

Mary Adelaide Dickey (1882-1960) was an American vaudeville performer, who performed as Adelaide or La Petite Adelaide. She was best known in the 1910s and 1920s as half of 'Adelaide and Hughes', a husband-and-wife dance partnership with Johnny J. Hughes.

== Life ==
Mary Adelaide Dickey was born in Cohoes, New York, in 1882, the oldest of three girls born to W. James and Josephine Dickey. She studied dance under C. H. Van Arnum in Troy, and by 1894 was toe dancing as La Petite Adelaide in New York City. In 1897 she made a movie, La Petite Adelaide, for American Mutoscope Company. Her speciality dance was a Doll Dance.

Around 1900 Adelaide married a fairground agent, William A. Lloyd. However, within a year Lloyd was arrested for stealing and pawning her clothes and jewelry, and the pair divorced. Adelaide performed for theater operators including B. F. Keith, Lee Shubert and Oscar Hammerstein. She appeared with James T. Power in The Blue Moon, and with Eddie Foy in The Orchid (1907). In 1908 she performed a toe dance on horseback at the New York Hippodrome. Only four foot five in height, she continued to be able to perform child roles.

Adelaide began dancing with Johnny J. Hughes, and toured Europe with him in 1911. Their act mixed genres: it was "operatic, ballet, and stage dancing, dashed through with the paprika of the Cakewalk and the Tango". On their return to the US, they appeared with Charlotte Greenwood in The Passing Show of 1912. The pair opened a dance studio in Brooklyn and married in 1913, touring together in an 8,000 mile honeymoon across the United States.

Adelaide and Hughes appeared together on Broadway in Monte Christo Jr. (1919) and Town Topics (1915). Together, the pair choreographed dances for vaudeville shows including Pierrot and Pierette (1914), The Dancing Divinities (1917), Classics of an Age (1917) and The Garden of the World (!917). They continued dancing together until Hughes's death in 1927. She retired from dancing and lived on until 1960.
