= Marie-Adélaïde de La Touche-Limouzinière =

French aristocrat and counter-revolutionary (1760–1794)

- Countess of La Roche
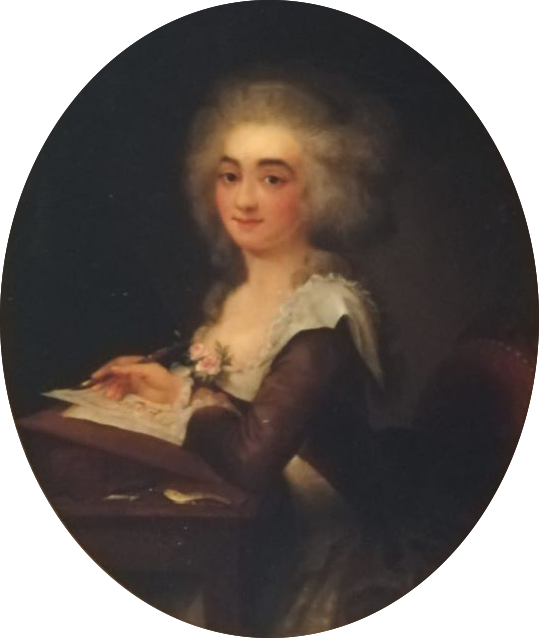
- Born: 5 March 1760; Grenada, French West Indies
- Died: 24 January 1794 (aged 33); Les Sables-d'Olonne, France
- Cause of death: Execution by shooting
- Wars and battles: War in the Vendée
- Spouse: Pierre Louis Marie de La Rochefoucauld-Bayers (m. 1778)
- Issue: 2
- Father: Henri-Louis de la Touche
- Mother: Jeanne-Marie Cocu, Lady of Greix
- Occupation: Counter-revolutionary and combatant

Marie-Adélaïde de La Touche-Limouzinière (married name de La Rochefoucauld-Bayers, 5 March 1760 – 24 January 1794), Countess of La Roche, was a French aristocrat, counter-revolutionary and combatant in the War in the Vendée.

== Early life and family ==
Marie Adélaïde de La Touche Limouzinière was born on the island of Grenada, a colony in the French West Indies, on 5 March 1760. Her father was Sir Henri-Louis de la Touche and her mother was Jeanne-Marie Cocu de la Fouchardière, Lady of Greix. Her family returned to France a few years after she was born.

On 4 June 1778, de La Touche Limouzinière married nobleman Pierre-Louis-Marie de la Rochefoucauld-Bayers in Nantes. He was a naval captain and Knight of Saint-Louis. She was styled after her marriage as Countess of La Roche. They had two children together, Louis Marie François de La Rochefoucauld-Bayers and Pierre François Marie de La Rochefoucauld-Bayers.

== War in the Vendée ==
Shortly after the outbreak of the War in the Vendée (a conflict between French revolutionaries and royalists), on 13 March 1793 the Countess of La Roche led a group of her sharecroppers, sabre in her hand, in a rally and captured La Garnache in Pays de la Loire. She set up a counter-revolutionary committee in the village, assisted by Joseph Thoumazeau of the Coudrie Commandery.

By the end of March, the Countess of La Roche had joined Alexandre Joseph Pierre Guerry du Cloudy's headquarters in Commequiers and was living in the home of her relative, the Countess Lespinay de La Roche d'Avau. She possibly took part in the attack on Les Sables-d'Olonne and the Battle of Palluau [fr] on 15 May 1793. Later in May 1793, the Countess of La Roche was received by counter-revolutionary military officer and leader François Athanase Charette de La Contrie, as recounted by officer Pierre-Suzanne Lucas de La Championnière, and they allegedly had a love affair.

In September or October 1793, the Countess of La Roche went into hiding in the marshes of the Challans region, before setting up a stronghold in Belleville. She was captured by revolutionaries on 16 January 1794 and was taken for questioning to Jean-François-Elie Hillereau, justice of the peace of La Roche-sur-Yon. She was sent to Les Sables-d'Olonne and was tried in court by the revolutionary military commission. She denied any involvement in the counter-revolutionary cause, but her testimony was contradicted by witnesses, such as Laurent Davy-Desnorois.

The Countess of La Roche was executed on 24 January 1794 at Les Sables-d'Olonne, aged 33. As the guillotine had been damaged and was unusable, she was shot to death.
