= Alice (name) =

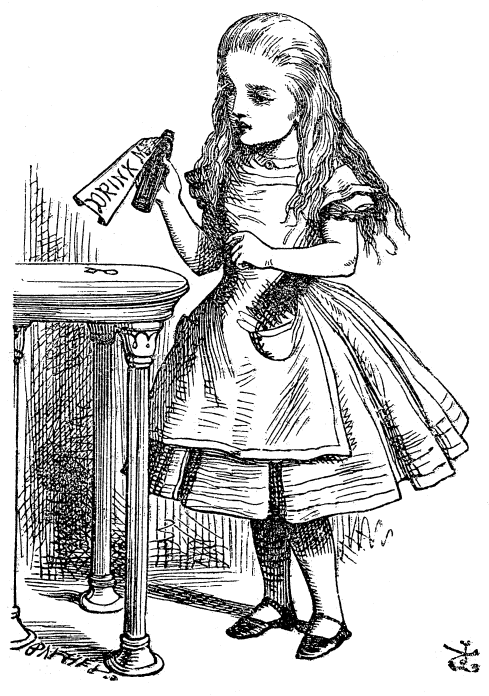
- Alice's Adventures in Wonderland, illustrated by John Tenniel, is an inspiration for the popularity of the name Alice.
- Pronunciation: /ˈælɪs/ German: [aˈliːsə] French: [alis] Italian: [aˈliːtʃe]
- Gender: Feminine
- Language: English, German, French, Italian

Origin
- Language: Old French
- Meaning: 'nobility'

Other names
- Variant forms: Alaïs, Alicia, Alisha, Alisa, Alissa, Alix, Aliz, Alíz, Alyce, Alys
- Related names: Adalheidis, Adalheide, Adelheide, Alitha, Alita, Zélie

Alice is a feminine first name with roots in the French and German languages.

== Etymology ==
Alice is a form of the Old French name Alis / Alys (older Alais), short form of Adelais, which is derived from the Old High German Adalhaidis (see Adelaide), from the Proto-Germanic words *aþala-, meaning 'noble' and *haidu-, meaning 'appearance; kind' (compare German Adel 'nobility', edel 'noble', nominalizing suffix -heit '-hood'), hence 'of noble character or rank, of nobility'. Alaïs is the Old French form of the name; Alys of Vexin was also known as Alaïs.

== Popularity as a given name ==
In 2015, the name appeared in the top 100 most popular names for baby girls in Australia, Belgium, France, Canada, Ireland, Scotland, England and Wales, and Northern Ireland. In England and Wales, it was ranked the 24th most popular name in 2015, but it has been less popular in the US until a recent resurgence. Some sources cite the resurgence starting in 2000, while others showed an up swing starting in 2010 One source attributes this to Tina Fey having named her daughter Alice in 2005, though this is more likely a case of coincidence than causality. Other sources attribute the rise in popularity to media sources such as the Twilight books by Stephenie Meyer. In Sweden and Italy it has appeared in the top ten names in recent years. In 2022, it was the 11th most popular name given to girls in Canada.

The name was most popular in the US in the Victorian era and at the turn of the 20th century. It has been popularized by Alice in Wonderland, by Lewis Carroll. It was also popular in the Victorian era due to The Princess Alice, a daughter of Queen Victoria. In the US, Alice Roosevelt Longworth, daughter of Theodore Roosevelt, was occasionally known as "Princess Alice" in the press and inspired a song called "Alice Blue Gown".

== Variants ==
Variants of the given name today include Alicia, Alison, and a short form, Allie, with many spelling variants. Alisa is a form of the name in popular use in Russia, Estonia and other countries. Aliki is the form used in Greek. Eilish (/ˈaɪlɪʃ/) may be the Irish form. There is also a variant from Hebrew origine, עליזה (Alee-zuh) which means cheerful (female.)

== People with the first name Alice ==
=== Royalty and nobility ===
- Alice of Antioch (c.1110 – after 1136), princess consort of Antioch by marriage to Bohemond II of Antioch
- Alice of Armenia (c.1182 – after 1234), ruling Lady of Toron from 1229 to 1234 as the eldest daughter of Ruben III, Prince of Armenia and his wife Isabella of Toron
- Alice of Champagne (c.1193 – 1246), queen consort and later regent of Cyprus, later regent of Jerusalem
- Alice of Hainault (died 1317), Hainault noblewoman and Countess of Norfolk
- Alice of Namur (died 1169), Lotharingian noblewoman and Countess of Hainault
- Alice of Saluzzo, Countess of Arundel (died 1292), Savoyard noblewoman and English countess
- Alice of Vergy, (1182–1251), Duchess of Burgundy
- Alice Cherleton, Baroness Cherleton (1378–1415), English noblewoman; alleged mistress of Cardinal Beaufort
- Alice de la Roche (died 1282), Burgundian noblewoman and regent of Beirut
- Alice de Lacy, Countess of Lincoln (1281–1348), English peeress in her own right
- Princess Alice, Duchess of Gloucester (née Lady Alice Christabel Montagu Douglas Scott) (1901–2004), member of the British royal family
- Alice FitzRoy (died bef. 1141), illegitimate daughter of King Henry I of England
- Alice Heine (1872–1918), princess consort of Monaco, wife of Albert I of Monaco
- Alice Holland, Countess of Kent (1350–1416), English noblewoman; wife of the half-brother of King Richard II
- Alix of Hesse (1872–1918), Empress Alexandra Feodorovna of Russia, daughter of Princess Alice of the United Kingdom
- Countess Alice Széchenyi (1911–1974), Hungarian-American heiress and Countess
- Princess Alice of Battenberg (1885–1969), aka Princess Andrew of Greece and Denmark, mother of Prince Philip, Duke of Edinburgh
- Princess Alice of Parma (1849–1935), Grand Duchess of Tuscany
- Princess Alice of the United Kingdom (1843–1878), Grand Duchess of Hesse and by Rhine, daughter of Queen Victoria
- Princess Alice, Countess of Athlone (1883–1981), member of the British royal family

=== Authors and poets ===
- Alice Adams (1926–1999), American author
- Alice Albinia (born 1976), British author
- Alice Birch, British playwright and screenwriter
- Alice Buckton (1867–1944), British poet, community playwright, feminist and mystic
- Alice Cary (1820–1871), poet
- Alice Childress (1916–1994), American novelist and playwright
- Alice Kingsbury Cooley (1839–1910), British-born American actress, author, and poet
- Alice Arnold Crawford (1850–1874), American poet
- Alice Turner Curtis (1860–1958), American writer
- Alice Williams Brotherton (1848–1930), American writer
- Alice Culler Cobb (1843-1918), American educator, missionary
- Alice May Douglas (1865–1943), American poet, author, editor
- Alice Olin Dows (1881–1963), American author and socialite
- Alice Dunbar Nelson (1875–1935), American poet, journalist and political activist
- Alice Eyton (1874–1929), New Zealand screenwriter
- Alice Flowerdew (1759–1830), English teacher, hymnwriter, religious poet
- Alice Fulton (born 1952), poet and author
- Alice Gossage (1861–1929), American newspaperwoman and journalist
- Alice Greenwood (1862–1935), British historian, teacher and writer
- Alice Rogers Hager (1894–1969), American writer, journalist, and traveler
- Alice Hayes (1657–1720), English Quaker preacher and autobiographer
- Alice Hoffman (born 1952), author of Practical Magic
- Alice Emma Ives (1876–1930), American dramatist, journalist
- Alice Eleanor Jones (1916–1981), American science fiction writer and journalist
- Alice Kuipers (born 1979), British–Canadian author
- Alice La Mazière (1880–1962), French journalist, socialist, and feminist activist
- Alice Elinor Lambert (1886–1981), American romance writer
- Alice MacDonell (1854–1938), Scottish poet
- Alice Marriott (1910–1992), American historian
- Alice Meynell (1847–1922) – British editor, writer, and poet
- Alice Moore McComas (1850–1919), American author, editor, lecturer, reformer
- Alice McDermott (born 1953), author
- Alice Duer Miller (1874–1942), author and poet
- Alice Munro (1931–2024), Canadian author
- Alice Naylor-Leyland, British fashion writer
- Alice Oseman (born 1994), British author and illustrator of young adult fiction
- Alice Oswald (born 1966), British poet
- Alice Parizeau (1930–1990), Polish journalist
- Alice Hobbins Porter (1854–1926), British–born American journalist and editor
- Alice Priestley (born 1962), Canadian writer and illustrator
- Alice Rivaz (1901–1998), Swiss author
- Alice Sebold (born 1963), American author of The Lovely Bones
- Alice Spigelman, Hungarian–born Australian clinical psychologist, writer, and human rights advocate
- Alice Tawhai, New Zealand writer
- Alice Thompson, Scottish novelist
- Alice Bellvadore Sams Turner (1859–1915), American physician and writer
- Alice Voinescu (1885–1961), Romanian writer
- Alice Walker (born 1944), novelist, short story writer, poet, and social activist
- Alis Wen (born c. 1520), Welsh language poet
- Alice Willard (1860–1936), American journalist and businesswoman
- Alice Robinson Boise Wood (1846–1919), American classicist and poet
- Alice Zimmern (1855–1939) British writer, translator, and suffragist

=== Musicians ===
- Alice (Visconti, born Carla Bissi) (born 1954), Italian singer-songwriter
- Alice (born Song Joo-hee), South Korean singer, a member of Hello Venus
- Alice Babs (1924–2014), Swedish singer and actress
- Alice Bag (born 1958), American punk rock singer
- Alice Boman (born 1987), Swedish singer-songwriter and musician
- Alice Caymmi (born 1990), Brazilian singer
- Alice Cohen (born 1958), American singer-songwriter and musician also known by the stage name Alice Desoto
- Alice Coltrane (1937–2007), American jazz pianist also known as Swamini Turiyasangitananda
- Alice Cooper (born 1948), American male rock musician
- Alice Coote (born 1968), British mezzo-soprano opera singer
- Alice Longyu Gao (born 1994), Chinese singer, songwriter, and disk jockey
- Alice Glass (born 1988), Canadian singer
- Alice Herz-Sommer (1903–2014), Czech–born Israeli classical pianist and music teacher
- Alice Ivy (born 1993), Australian musician and producer
- Alice Levine (1986), British radio disk jockey and presenter
- Alice Phoebe Lou (born 1993), South African–born German singer and songwriter
- Alice Martineau (1972–2003), British singer and songwriter
- Alice Merton (born 1993), German–Canadian singer and songwriter
- Alice Nielsen (1872–1943), American operatic lyric soprano
- Alice Nutter (born 1962), English musician
- Alice on the Roof (born 1995), Belgian singer
- Alice Prin (1901–1953), French singer and actress
- Alice Russell (born 1975), English singer
- Alice Carter Simmons (1883–1943), American pianist, organist, and music educator
- Alice Smith (born 1977), American singer and songwriter
- Alice Mary Smith (1839–1884), English composer
- Alice Verlet (1873–1934), Belgian operatic coloratura soprano
- Alice Verne-Bredt (1864–1958), English piano teacher, composer, and violinist
- Alice Vinette (1894–1989), Canadian composer
- Alice Ivy Wigmore (1895–1982) Australian violinist and philanthropist

=== Actresses and filmmakers ===
- Alice Amter (born 1966), English actress
- Alice Atherton (1854–1899), American burlesque dancer and actress
- Alice Barrett (born 1956), American actress
- Alice Bellagamba (born 1987), Italian actress and dancer
- Alice Bendová (born 1973), Czech actress
- Alice Bier Zandén (born 1995), Danish–Swedish actress
- Alice Bird, British actress
- Alice Brady (1892–1939), American actress
- Alice Braga (born 1983), Brazilian actress and producer
- Alice Calhoun (1900–1966), American actress
- Alice Carvalho (born 1996), Brazilian actress, screenwriter and singer
- Alice Chan (born 1973), Hong Kong actress
- Alice Cocéa (1899–1970), French actress
- Alice Connor (born 1990), English actress
- Alice Davenport (1864–1936), American actress
- Alice Day (1906–1995), American actress
- Alice Dinnean (born 1969), American puppeteer
- Alice Diop (born 1979), French filmmaker
- Alice Dixson (born 1969), Filipino–American actress, commercial model, and beauty queen
- Alice Dovey (1884–1969), American actress
- Alice Dwyer (born 1988), German actress
- Alice Englert (born 1994), Australian actress, filmmaker, singer, and songwriter
- Alice Evans (born 1968), British–American actress
- Alice Eve (born 1982), English actress
- Alice Faye (1915–1998), American actress and singer
- Alice Fearn (born 1983), English actress and singer
- Alice Gale (1858–1941), American actress
- Alice Ghostley (1923–2007), American actress and singer
- Alice Greczyn (born 1986), American actress and model
- Alice Guy-Blaché (1873–1968), French filmmaker
- Alice Haig (born 1985), English actress
- Alice Hirson (1929–2025), American actress
- Alice Hollister (1886–1973), American actress
- Alice Howell (1886–1961), American actress
- Alice Isaaz (born 1991), French actress
- Alice Joyce (1890–1955), American actress
- Alice Kremelberg, American actress and writer
- Alice Krige (born 1954), South African actress
- Alice Lake (1895–1967), American actress
- Alice Lowe (born 1977), English actress, comedian, and filmmaker
- Alice Lloyd (1873–1949), English music hall artist and vaudevillian
- Alice Mann (actress) (1899–1986), American actress
- Alice Marriott (1824–1900), English actress
- Alice G. McGee (1869–1895) American actress and lawyer
- Alice Moran, Canadian actress
- Alice Nellis (born 1971), Czech filmmaker
- Alice Norin (born 1987), Norwegian–Indonesian actress
- Alice O'Fredericks (1899–1968), Swedish–born Danish actress and filmmaker
- Alice Ong (born 1994), Burmese actress and model
- Alice Ormsby-Gore (1952–1995), English aristocrat
- Alice Pearce (1917–1966), American actress
- Alice Playten (1947–2011), American actress
- Alice Ripley (born 1963), American actress
- Alice Robitaille (1923–2011), Canadian actress
- Alice Rohrwacher (born 1981), German–Italian filmmaker
- Alice B. Russell (1889–1985), American actress
- Alice St Clair (born 1988), English actress and poet
- Alice Taglioni (born 1976), French actress
- Alice Teghil (born 1989), Italian actress
- Alice Terry (1899–1987), American actress
- Alice Waddington (born 1990), Spanish filmmaker
- Alice White (1904–1983), American actress
- Alice Winocour (born 1976), French filmmaker
- Alice Wu (born 1970), Chinese–American filmmaker
- Aliki Vougiouklaki (1934–1996), Greek actress

=== Science and medicine ===
- Alice Mary Barry (1880–1955), Irish doctor
- Alice M. Dimick (1878–1956), American mathematician
- Alice Harvie Duden (1873–1926), first woman lecturer at the Indiana Dental College
- Alice Catherine Evans (1881–1975), American microbiologist
- Alice Fitzgerald (1875–1962), American nurse
- Alice Hamilton (1869–1970), American toxicologist
- Alice Leigh-Smith (née Prebil) (1907–1987), Croatian born British nuclear physicist
- Alice Masaryková (1879–1966), Czech sociologist and politician
- Alice Miller (1923–2010), Swiss psychologist
- Alice Pataxó (born 2001), Brazilian indigenous climate activist
- Alice Morgan Person (1840–1913), American patent medicine entrepreneur
- Alice Pruvot-Fol (1873–1972), French opisthobranch malacologist
- Alice Recoque (1929–2021), French computer scientist, computer engineer and computer architecture specialist
- Alice Rivlin (1931–2019), American economist
- Alice Roberts (born 1973), British anatomist, osteoarchaeologist, anthropologist, television presenter and author
- Alice Săvulescu (1905–1970), Romanian botanist
- Alice G. Schirmer (1875–1935), American nurse and cookbook writer
- Alice Sollier (1861–1942), first Black French woman to qualify as a medical doctor
- Alice Whitley (1913–1990), Australian chemist and educator
- Alice Wilson (1881–1964), Canadian geologist and palaeontologist
- Alice Withrow (1907–1998), American botanist, plant physiologist and researcher of plant photochemistry
- Alice Vickery (1844–1929), British physician and activist
- Alice Vrielink, researcher in crystallography

=== Activists ===
- Alice of Dunk's Ferry (died 1802), African–American enslaved woman and oral historian
- Alice Abadam (1856–1940), Welsh suffragette, feminist, and public speaker
- Alice M. Birdsall (1880–1958), attorney, an expert in bankruptcy law, and a female rights advocate
- Alice Schiavoni Bosio (1871–1931), Italian suffragette
- Alice Bunker Stockham (1833–1912), American suffragist
- Alice A. W. Cadwallader (1832–1910), American philanthropist and temperance activist
- Alice Barbee Castleman (1843–1926), American social leader, philanthropist, and suffragist
- Alice Davies (born 1870 – alive in 1919), British suffragette and nurse
- Alice Drakoules (c. 1850–1933), British social reformer
- Alice Embleton (1876–1960), British suffragette and zoologist
- Alice P. Gannett (1875–1962), American settlement house worker and social reformer
- Alice Garoute (1874–1950), Haitian suffragist and advocate for women's rights
- Alice Sudduth Byerly (1855–1904), American temperance activist
- Alice Hamilton (1869–1970), American peace activist during World War I
- Alice Hawkins (1863–1946), British suffragette
- Alice Herz (1882–1965), German feminist and anti-war protester
- Alice Hoagland (1949–2020), American flight attendant and activist
- Alice Jouenne (1873–1954), French teacher and socialist activist
- Alice Little (born 1990), Irish–American sex-worker and advocate
- Alice Meynell (1847–1922), English suffragist and poet
- Alice Cary McKinney (1865–1928), American temperance and social reformer
- Alice Milligan (1865–1953), Irish nationalist
- Alice Moderno (1867–1946) – Portuguese writer, and campaigner for women's rights and animals rights
- Alice Mofflin (1878–1961), Australian philanthropist and charity worker
- Alice Morrissey (died 1912), British Catholic, socialist leader and suffragette
- Alice Wairimu Nderitu (born 1968), Kenyan United Nations Special Adviser on the Prevention of Genocide to UN Secretary-General
- Alice Paul (1885–1977), American suffragist and British suffragette
- Alice E. Heckler Peters (1845–1921), American social reformer
- Alice Pollard, Solomon Islander women's rights and peace advocate
- Alice Schwarzer (born 1942), German feminist and publisher
- Alice Sheppard, British choreographer, dancer and disability activist
- Alice Bhagwandai Singh (1891–1970), Surinamese activist and proto-feminist
- Alice Ames Winter (1865–1944), American litterateur, author, clubwoman, suffragist
- Alice Wolfson, American activist and attorney who specializes in women's health
- Alice Wong (born 1974), American disability rights activist

=== Athletes ===
- Alice Arnott (born 1998), Australian field hockey player
- Alice Blom (born 1980), Dutch volleyball player
- Alice Cast (born 1900), British sprinter
- Alice D'Amato (born 2003), Italian artistic gymnast
- Alice Duncalf, Canadian lawn bowler
- Alice Griffiths (born 2001), Welsh footballer
- Alice Kertész (born 1935), Hungarian-born Olympic gymnastics medalist
- Alice Kinsella, (born 2001) British artistic gymnast
- Alisa Kleybanova (born 1989), Russian tennis player
- Alice Mason (born 1987), New Zealand long-distance runner
- Alice Mills (born 1986), Australian Olympic swimmer
- Alice Noháčová (born 1967), Czech tennis player
- Alice Pignagnoli (born 1988), Italian footballer
- Alice Pirsu (born 1979), Romanian tennis player
- Alice Pollitt (1929–2016), American baseball player
- Alice Powell (born 1993), British racing driver
- Alice Pumphrey (born 2006), English boxer
- Alice Schlesinger (born 1988), Israeli judoka
- Alice Tai (born 1999), British paralympic swimmer
- Alice Tortelli (born 1998), Italian footballer
- Alice Volpi (born 1992), Italian right-handed foil fencer
- Alice Whitty (1934–2017), Canadian high jumper
- Alice Zeimann (born 1998), New Zealand beach volleyball player
- Poker Alice (1851–1930), American poker and faro player

=== Artists ===
- Alice Adams (born 1930), American sculpturer
- Alice Avery (1868–1957), New Zealand artist
- Alice Aycock (born 1946), American sculptor and installation artist.
- Alice D. Engley Beek (1876–1951), American watercolor painter
- Alice Boner (1889–1981), Swiss painter and sculptor, art historian, and Indologist
- Alice Brusewitz, New Zealand photographer
- Alice Burr (1883–1968), American photographer
- Alice Robertson Carr de Creeft (1899–1996), American sculptor
- Alice A. Casneau, (1866–1953), American dressmaker and clubwoman
- Alice Chapman (1860–1929), Australian artist known for portraits and genre paintings
- Alice Cohn (1914–2000), German-Jewish graphic artist and forger for the Dutch resistance during World War II
- Alice Creischer (born 1960), German artist, writer and theorist
- Alice Mary Hagen (1872–1972), Canadian ceramic artist
- Alice Hanratty (1939–2025), Irish artist
- Alice Julius (1846–1918), New Zealand artist
- Alice Jacobsen (1928–1993), American sculptor
- Alice Könitz (born 1970), German-born American sculptor and collage artist
- Alice Ngayu Lai (born 1976), Hong Kong artist
- Alice Maher (born 1956), Irish painter and sculptor
- Alice Mason (1904–1971), American artist, writer, and cofounder of the American Abstract Artists group (AAA)
- Alice Mak, Hong Kong artist and cartoonist
- Alice Maude-Roxby (born 1963), British multidisciplinary artist
- Alice Michaelis (1875–1943), German painter
- Alice Neel (1900–1984), American visual artist
- Alice Nordin (1871–1948), Swedish sculptor
- Alice O'Malley (born 1962), American photographer
- Alice Rahon (1904–1987), French-born Mexican abstract expressionist painter and writer
- Alice Ruggles Sohier (1880–1969), American painter
- Alice Tangerini (born 1949), American botanical illustrator and curator
- Alice Trübner (1875–1916), German artist
- Alice Wadowski (1935–2008), Polish-American artist and creator of wycinanki (paper-cutting)
- Alice Beach Winter (1877–1968), American suffragist artist of portraiture and post-impressionistic landscapes
- Alice B. Woodward (1862–1951), British artist and illustrator

=== Miscellaneous ===
- Alice of Schaerbeek (c. 1220–1250), Cistercian lay sister venerated as patron saint of the blind and paralyzed
- Alice Arnold (1881–1955), politician, trade unionist and first female mayor of Coventry, England
- Alice Auma (1956–2007), Ugandan spiritualist and medium
- Alice Austen (1866–1952), photographer
- Alice Ayres (1859–1885), an English nursemaid honoured for her bravery in rescuing children from a house fire
- Alice Bailey (1880–1949), theologist and lecturer
- Alice Barnham (1592–1650), wife of Francis Bacon
- Alice Bentinck (born 1986), co-founder and COO of Entrepreneur First, London
- Alice Brask (born 1938), Danish politician
- Alice Broad (fl. 1661–1664), first female printer in York, England
- Alice Brock (1941–2024), owner of the Massachusetts eatery that inspired the Arlo Guthrie tune Alice's Restaurant Massacree
- Alice Willson Broughton (1889–1980), First Lady of North Carolina
- Alice Pollard Clark (born 1940), American jurist
- Alice Brown Davis (1852–1935), Seminole tribal chief
- Alice Burdeu (born 1988), Australian fashion model
- Alice Cambridge (1762–1829), early Irish Methodist preacher
- Alice Delahunty (born 1981), Irish chartered electrical engineer
- Aliki Diplarakou (1912–2002), Greek Miss Europe winner
- Alice Elizabeth Doherty (1887–1933), known for her rare condition of hypertrichosis lanuginosa
- Alice Gainer, American news anchor
- Alice Guo (born 1990), Filipino politician
- Alice Halstedt (1920–2012), American politician
- Alice la Haubergere (1271–1310), English blacksmith
- Alice Henley (died 1470), English abbess
- Alice Houghton (1849–1920), Canadian–born American broker
- Alice Kasai (1916–2007), Japanese–American civil rights leader
- Alice Keppel (1868–1947), mistress of Edward VII of the United Kingdom
- Alice Elisabeth Kotelawala, Sri Lankan Sinhala businesswoman and philanthropist
- Alice Kyteler (1263–1325), first recorded person condemned for witchcraft in Ireland
- Alice Lau (disambiguation), several people
- Alice Liddell (1852–1934), the real person upon whom the eponymous heroine of Alice's Adventures in Wonderland is based
- Alice Lisle (1617–1685), a judge at the trial of Charles I of England
- Alice Litman, English transgender woman (2002–2022)
- Alice Roosevelt Longworth (1884–1980), only child of Theodore Roosevelt and his first wife, Alice Hathaway Lee
- Alice Mahon (1937–2022), British politician
- Alice Manfield (1878–1960), Australian mountain guide, naturalist, photographer, chalet owner, and early feminist
- Alice Marriott (1907–2000), American businesswoman
- Alice Marsh (1911–1976), American socialite
- Alice Nutter (died 1612), English noblewoman hanged as a result of the Pendle witch hunt
- Alice Orlowski (1903–1976), high-ranking Nazi SS officer
- Alice Panikian (born 1985), Bulgarian–born Canadian model
- Alice Prin (1901–1953), French model, memoirist, and painter
- Alice Roberts (born 1973), British historian and television presenter
- Alice Hathaway Lee Roosevelt (1861–1884), wife of Theodore Roosevelt
- Alice Strike (1896–2004), Canadian military veteran
- Alice B. Toklas (1877–1967), paramour of writer Gertrude Stein and member of the Parisian avant-garde
- Alice Walton (born 1949), the daughter of Walmart founder Sam Walton
- Alice Wang (born 1964), Taiwanese politician
- Alice Waters (born 1944), American chef and restaurateur
- Alice Woods (educationist) (1849–1941), British educationist
- Alice Young, first "witch" to be executed during the Salem witch trials

== People with the surname Alice ==
- Antonio Alice (1886–1943), Argentine portrait painter
- Beatrice Kamuchanga Alice (born 1997), a long-distance runner from the Democratic Republic of the Congo
- Georgia Mannion (born 2003), professionally known as George Alice, Australian singer/songwriter
- Jocelyn Alice, Canadian singer and songwriter of indie soul pop duo Jocelyn & Lisa
- Maria Alice de Fátima Rocha Silva (born 1971), known as Maria Alice, Cape Verdean singer
- Mary Alice (1936–2022), American film, television, and stage actress
- Wolf Alice, British rock band

== Fictional characters ==
As single name

- Alice, a character commonly featured in cryptography books together with her partner Bob
- Alice, the eponymous heroine of the Lewis Carroll novels Alice's Adventures in Wonderland and Through the Looking-Glass
- Alice, a caffeine-crazed engineer from Scott Adams' comic strip Dilbert
- Alice (DC Comics), a character in DC Comics
- Artificial Labile Intelligent Cybernated Existence, an AI in the Japanese light novel series Sword Art Online
  - Alice (Sword Art Online), a character in that series

As given name

- Alice Abernathy, a character in the Resident Evil film series, portrayed by Milla Jovovich
- Alice Branning, a character in the BBC soap opera EastEnders, played by Jasmyn Banks
- Alice Cooper, Betty Cooper's mother in Archie Comics and TV show Riverdale
- Alice Cullen, vampire character in Stephenie Meyer's Twilight (novel series)
- Alice Elliot, a character from the Shadow Hearts series
- Alice the Fox, a crook fox from The Golden Key, or the Adventures of Buratino fairy tale
- Alice Green, the main character from Big City Greens
- Alice the Goon, a character in the Popeye comic strip
- Alice Gunderson, a character, the Quartermaines' maid on the American soap opera General Hospital
- Alice Hardy, a character in the Friday the 13th series
- Alice Horton, a character, a matriarch on the American soap opera Days of Our Lives
- Alice Johnson, a character in the Nightmare on Elm Street film series
- Alice Kelly, a character from the animated series Wylde Pak
- Alice Kramden, long-suffering wife of Ralph on the American sitcom The Honeymooners
- Alice Nelson, the housekeeper for the Bradys on The Brady Bunch
- Alice Pieszecki, a character from Showtime's lesbian drama series The L Word
- Alice (Alisa) Selezneva, the main heroine of Kir Bulychov's children's science fiction book series
- Alice Squires, a character in Nexo Knights
- Black Alice, a DC Comics superhero character with magical powers, first introduced in Birds of Prey #76
