= Aliki =

Aliki may refer to:

- Aliki (name), a given name, usually Greek
  - Aliki, the penname of Aliki Brandenberg (born 1929) children's book author
- Ariki, a Polynesian chief
  - Amelia Tokagahahau Aliki (1845–1895), queen of Uvea (Pacific Island)
- Alyki, a village and beach in Agkairia, Paros, Greece
- Aliki My Love a 1963 film directed by Rudolph Maté

== See also ==
- 'Aliki, term to denote social rank in Wallisian and Futunan Polynesian languages
