= Brusewitz (surname) =

Brusewitz is a German surname. Notable people with the surname include:

- Joachim Wilhelm Friedrich Carl Oscar von Brüsewitz (1891–1966), German podium dancer
- Axel Brusewitz (1881–1950), Swedish professor of political science
- Helmut Brüsewitz (born 1925–1999), German bassist, composer and arranger best known through his works for Bert Kaempfert's special sound
- Oskar Brüsewitz (1929–1976), East German Lutheran pastor
- Ellen Maria Brusewitz (née Holmström, 1878–1952), Swedish tennis player
- Alice Brusewitz (née Palmer), New Zealand commercial photographer
- Karl-Friedrich von Brüsewitz (1738–1811), Prussian army officer

== See also ==
- Brüsewitz, a municipality in the Northwestern Mecklenburg district
