= Dorothy Price (endocrinologist) =

American endocrinologist (1899–1980)

- Born: 1899; Aurora, Illinois
- Died: November 17, 1980 (aged 80–81)
- Education: University of Chicago
- Scientific career
- Fields: endocrinology

Dorothy Price (1899–1980) was an American physiologist and endocrinologist. She is best known for her discovery of the principle of negative feedback in endocrine axis regulation, in work done alongside Carl Moore. She is considered one of the early pioneers in the field of neuroendocrinology.

== Biography ==
Price was born in Aurora, Illinois in 1899, and received her Bachelor of Science from the University of Chicago in 1922. After graduating, she briefly pursued graduate work in embryology, but financial difficulties caused her to leave graduate school. Searching for work, she was offered a position as a histological technician in the lab of endocrinologist Carl R. Moore, who was studying sexual development at the time. Price would continue to work for, and with, Moore for the rest of his career at the University of Chicago. In 1935, she earned her PhD from the University of Chicago studying the development of male prostate and seminal vesicles in rodents. In 1947, she became an assistant professor at the University of Chicago, nearly 25 years after entering the department as a technician. Before her retirement in 1967, Price collaborated with researchers at the University of Leiden, University of Puerto Rico, and Johns Hopkins University for the rest of her academic career, and served on many editorial and review boards.

== Research contributions ==
When Price joined the lab of Carl Moore as a technician, Moore was researching "antagonistic" effects between the male and female sex steroids, testosterone and estradiol in the male reproductive system, with often confusing results. While analyzing this data, Price laid out the principle of "reciprocal influence", now known as negative feedback, where the hormone produced by the gonad could also regulate its own stimulation via its effects on the anterior pituitary. Together Moore and Price conducted experiments to show that gonadal hormones could indeed regulate the anterior pituitary (as well as vice versa), and first published the framework in 1930. The negative feedback framework would later be expanded to include the hypothalamus by Geoffrey Harris, and is currently considered a "cornerstone" of endocrinology. The principles discovered by Price and Moore were later used to design and develop hormonal birth control.

Although Price originally came up with the negative feedback theory to explain her and Moore's contradictory data, the framework was termed "Moore-Price theory" and Moore was first author on all published papers. Later, Price would be quoted saying that at that time, "women were not really considered scientifically equal to men", Moore was a "male chauvinist" but "did not realize the depth of his own prejudice". However, Moore and Price had a positive research relationship, and she wrote his memorial biography for the National Academy of Sciences.

Later in her career, Price studied sexual differentiation and development. She extended the organizational-activational hypothesis, showing that fetal androgens can "masculinize" the brain and lead to male sexual behavior in rodents.
