= Aliki (name) =

Aliki (Αλίκη) is a feminine given name, the Greek form of Alice.

== People with Greek feminine given name ==
- Aliki Diplarakou (1912–2002), also known as Aliki, Lady Russell, was a winner of Miss Europe
- Aliki Kayaloglou is a Greek singer
- Aliki Konstantinidou, born 1989, Greek volleyball player
- Aliki Liacouras Brandenberg, pen name Aliki, born 1928, Greek-American children's book author
- Aliki Stamatina Vougiouklaki, 1934–1996, Greek actress
- Aliki Stergiadu, born 1972, Uzbekistan-born Soviet ice dancer
- Aliki Theofilopoulos Kiriakou, born 1972, Greek-American television animator and producer

== Other people with given name ==
- Aliki Fakate, born 1985, French rugby player

== See also ==
- Ariki, a Polynesian social rank
  - Amelia Tokagahahau Aliki (1845–1895), queen of Uvea (Pacific Island)
- Alyki, a village and beach in Agkairia, Paros, Greece
