= Alice Morgan =

Alice Morgan is the name of:

- Alice Morgan Person (1840–1913), maiden name Alice Morgan, American patent medicine entrepreneur
- Alice Morgan (Luther), fictional character played by Ruth Wilson
- Alice Morgan (1865–1933), wife of American diplomat John R. Carter
- Alice Morgan (c. 1901–1951), British woman murdered by James Inglis
- Alice Mary Morgan (1850–1890), married name of English painter and illustrator Alice Havers

== See also ==
- Alice Morgan Wright (1881–1975), American sculptor and suffragist
