= Withrow =

Withrow may refer to:

== People with the surname ==
- Alice Withrow (1907–1998), American botanist, and author
- Cal Withrow 1945–2011), NFL football player
- Chris Withrow (born 1989), American professional baseball player
- Cory Withrow (born 1975), NFL football player
- Gardner Robert Withrow (1892–1964), a former member of the United States House of Representatives
- Glenn Withrow (born 1953), American actor
- John Jacob Withrow (1833–1900), Canadian businessman and politician
- John L. Withrow (1837–1909), American Presbyterian minister
- Mary Ellen Withrow (born 1930), former Treasurer of the United States
- William Henry Withrow (1839–1908), a Canadian Methodist minister, journalist, and author

== Places ==
=== Canada ===
- Withrow, Alberta, a hamlet
- Withrow Park, Toronto, Ontario

=== United States ===
- Withrow Springs State Park in NW Arkansas
- Withrow, Minnesota
- Withrow, Washington
- Withrow Moraine and Jameson Lake Drumlin Field, Douglas County, Washington

== See also ==
- Witherow
