= Pignagnoli =

Pignagnoli is an Italian surname. Notable people with the surname include:

- Alfredo Pignagnoli (born 1951), Italian record producer, composer and musician
- Alice Pignagnoli (born 1988), Italian footballer
