= Alice Mary Barry =

Irish Doctor

Alice Barry
- Born: Alice Mary Barry; 8 April 1880; Cork, Ireland
- Died: 2 July 1955 (aged 75); Dublin, Ireland
- Occupation: Physician

Alice Mary Barry (8 April 1880 – 2 July 1955) was an Irish medical doctor, the first woman to be nominated for a fellowship of the Royal College of Physicians of Ireland.

== Early life and career ==
Barry was born in Cork, Ireland, to Richard Barry and Mary Mahony. She gained her medical licence in 1906 from the Royal College of Physicians of Ireland graduating from the Apothecaries Hall. She was one of only six women to do this between 1885 and 1922.

Her residency was with the Mater Hospital in Dublin. She gained a Diploma in Public Health in 1905. As one of the early women doctors, Barry was an active and founding member of the Women's National Health Association which began in 1908. Through the association Barry became the medical officer for nine Babies Clubs in Dublin from 1912 to 1929.

Barry was one of the founders of St Ultan's Infant Hospital that was first opened in 1919 in Dublin, and one of the benefactors and fundraisers for the hospital. She worked with the various government-established councils on public health and medical services in Ireland.

While based in Cork, Barry worked in Kilbrittain as the dispensary district medical officer until she was succeeded there by Dorothy Stopford Price. She was a supporter of the republican movement and was known to give shelter to republicans seeking shelter during the war of independence. On one occasion, by pretending to be visiting a sick patient, Barry prevented one arrest of Michael Collins and walked out of a house of British soldiers with his papers under her jumper.

Later, Barry began to focus on TB, and was running sanatoria, one in Rossclare, County Fermanagh and then the Peamount Sanatorium in Newcastle, County Dublin, where she developed treatments and care routines for the children sent there. She was involved in the foundation of the Peamount Industries.

== Fellowship ==
Barry was a member of the Royal College of Physicians of Ireland (RCPI) from 1911 and was the first woman to be nominated for a fellowship in 1914. However her nomination was withdrawn when a ruling by the college restricted the award to men. This caused the college to review and then update the rules which then permitted women to become fellows but it took until 1930 for Barry to be elected.

== Death ==
Poor health caused Barry to resign from full-time work in 1946 but she continued to devote her time to St. Ultan's. She died on 2 July 1955 in Dublin and is buried in Glasnevin.
