= Dorothy Price =

Dorothy Price may refer to:

- Dorothy Price (physician), Irish physician
- Dorothy Price (endocrinologist), American physiologist and endocrinologist
- Dorothy Price (art historian), British art historian and academic
- Dorothy Carnegie, née Price, American writer
