= Lo Hesse =

German dancer

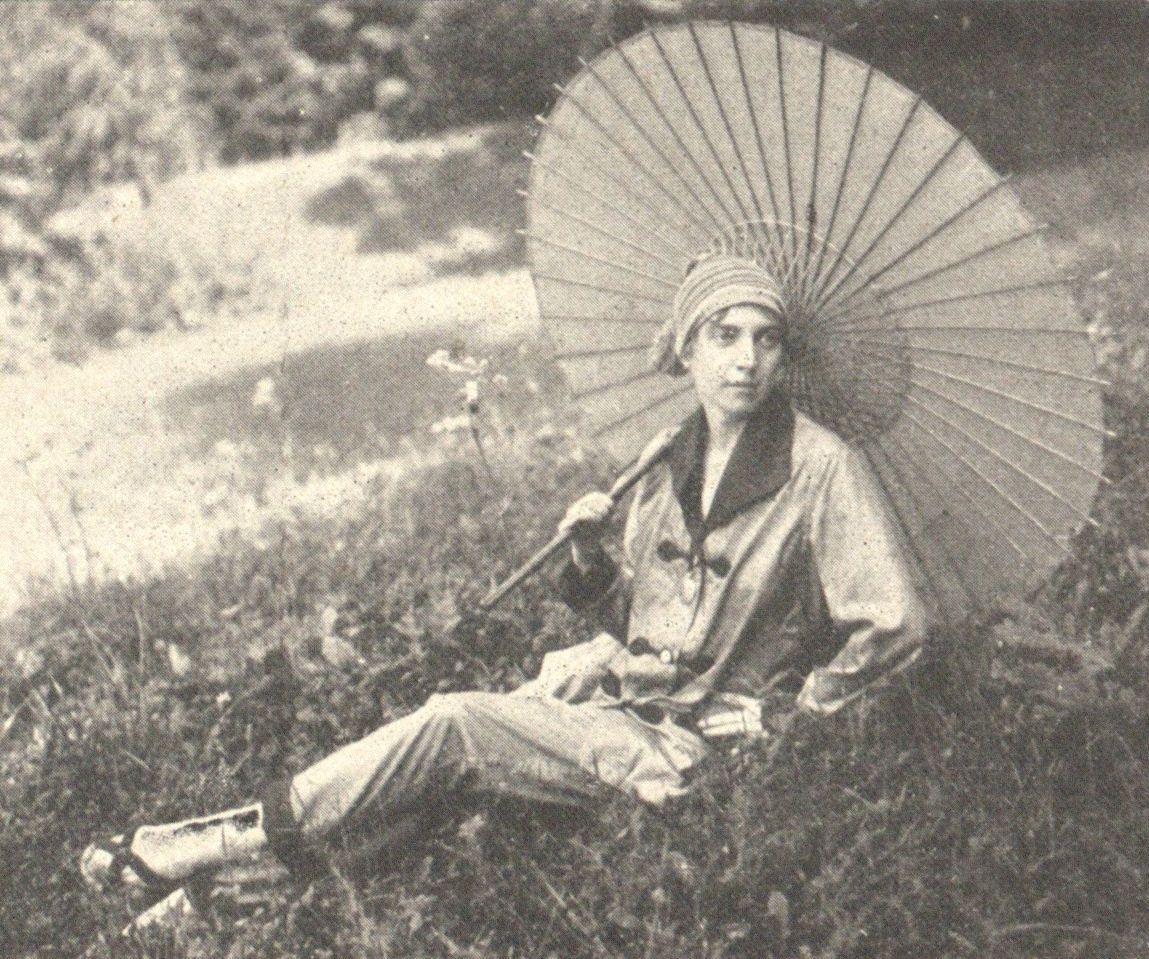
Photo taken in 1918

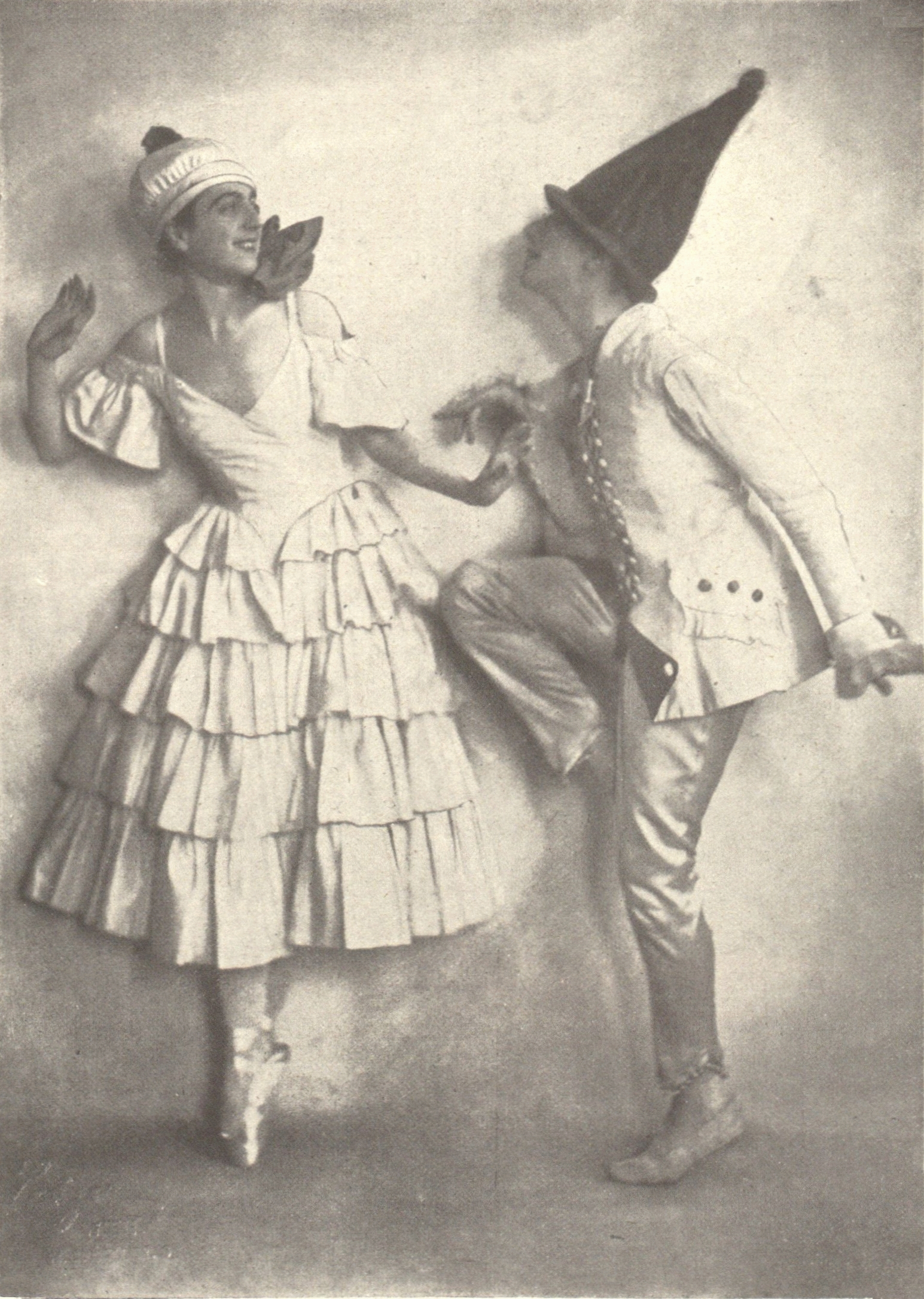
Lo Hesse and Joachim von Seewitz (Sport & Salon; February 14, 1918)

Lo Hesse (born 6 August 1889 in Berlin; died 1983?) was a German dancer.

== Biography ==
She was the dancing partner of Joachim von Seewitz and was employed at the Staatsoper Berlin. In 1919 she refused a commitment at the Vienna State Opera and went on tour to South America.

Her biographical legacy is kept in the German Dance Archive Cologne.

She also worked as an actress and a model for Ernst Stern.
