= Witherow =

Witherow is a surname, and may refer to:

- Charles Witherow (1852–1948), American baseball pitcher
- John Witherow (born 1952), British journalist,
- Peter Witherow (born 1987), Irish Gaelic football player

== See also ==
- Withrow (disambiguation)
