= Brüsewitz =

- Municipality
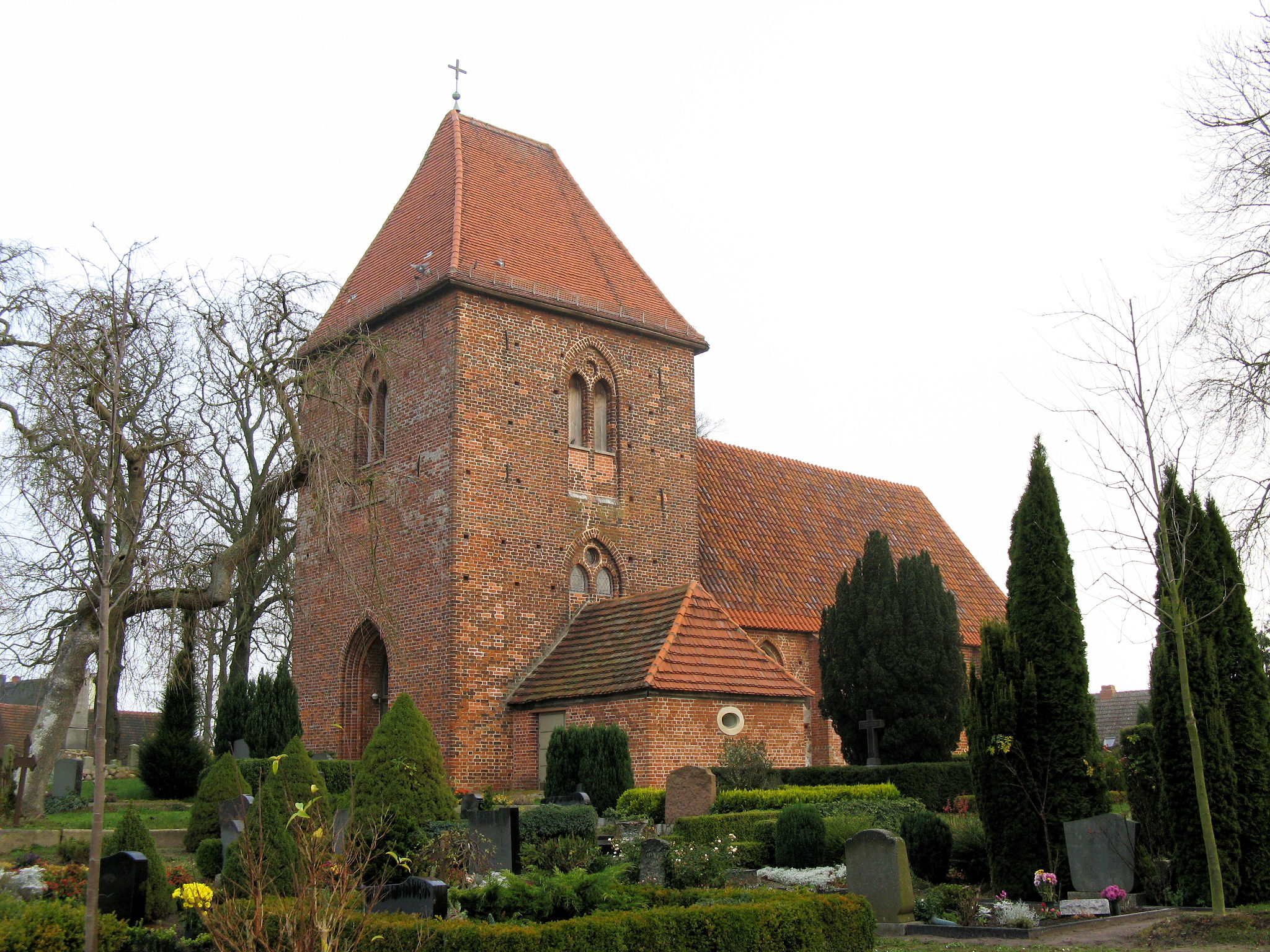
- Church

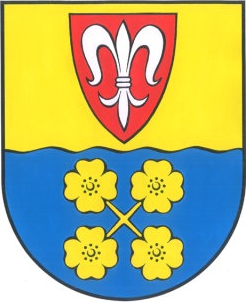
- Coat of arms

- Location of Brüsewitz within Nordwestmecklenburg district
- Interactive map of Brüsewitz
- Location within Germany Location within Mecklenburg-Vorpommern
- Coordinates: 53°40′N 11°15′E
- Country: Germany
- State: Mecklenburg-Vorpommern
- District: Nordwestmecklenburg
- Municipal assoc.: Lützow-Lübstorf

Government
  - Mayor: Manfred Dutz

Area
  - Total: 29.88 km^{2} (11.54 sq mi)
- Elevation: 54 m (177 ft)

Population (2025-12-31)
  - Total: 1,818
  - Density: 60.84/km^{2} (157.6/sq mi)
- Time zone: UTC+01:00 (CET)
  - Summer (DST): UTC+02:00 (CEST)
- Postal codes: 19071
- Dialling codes: 038874
- Vehicle registration: NWM

Brüsewitz is a municipality in the Nordwestmecklenburg district, in Mecklenburg-Vorpommern, Germany. Besides the village of Brüsewitz, the municipality includes the villages of Gottmannsförde, Groß Brütz and Herren Steinfeld.

== See also ==
- Brusewitz (surname), for people with the surname
