= Marion Tylee =

New Zealand artist

Marion Elizabeth Tylee
- Born: Marion Elizabeth Tylee; 25 May 1900; Pahiatua, New Zealand
- Died: 27 February 1981 (aged 80)
- Education: Slade School of Fine Art, Académie Colarossi
- Known for: Painting – oils, watercolour, and linocuts

Marion Elizabeth Tylee (25 May 1900 – 27 February 1981) was a New Zealand artist.

== Private life ==
Born at Makuri near Pahiatua, New Zealand, she was the daughter of Walter Edward Charles Tylee and his wife Katherine Anne née Perry. Her aunt, Alice Lethbridge Avery (née Perry) was also a New Zealand artist. After the Second World War she settled in Palmerston North, New Zealand.

== Career ==
Tylee studied in New Zealand with D. K. Richmond at Miss Barber's Academy in Wellington. In 1923 she attended the Canterbury College School of Art, and she won a New Zealand Academy of Fine Arts award for a watercolour. She later trained with T. A. McCormack. From 1926 to 1929 she attended the Slade School of Fine Art in London and in 1937 at Académie Colarossi in Paris.

She worked primarily in linocuts, watercolour, and oils. Works by Tylee are held at the Museum of New Zealand Te Papa Tongarewa including: Crimson plums (1953); Village in the hills (c. 1930); Mount Tarawera, New Zealand (1935); and Rooftops (c. 1928).

After moving to Palmerston North she played a major role in the development of the Manawatu Art Gallery (now part of the Te Manawa Museum of Art, Science and History).

=== Exhibitions ===
Tylee exhibited with the:

- Auckland Society of Arts
- Canterbury Society of Arts
- New Zealand Academy of Fine Arts
- Rutland Group
- The Group (1934)
