= Alice Könitz =

German artist

- Born: 1970 (age 55–56); Essen, West Germany
- Education: California Institute of the Arts; Düsseldorf Art Academy
- Known for: Sculpture

Alice Könitz (born 1970, Essen, Germany) is an artist based in Los Angeles. Her sculptures, films, and collages use a formal language that is influenced by the contemporary built environment and early modernism. Könitz studied at the Kunstakademie in Duesseldorf and at Cal Arts.

She received an Akademiebrief from the Kunstakademie in Duesseldorf in 1996 and an MFA from California Institute of the Arts in 1999.

Her work has been shown widely in the US and internationally. It was included in the Hammer Museum's biennial Made in L.A 2014, the 2008 Whitney Biennial, the 2008 California Biennial, Half Square Half Crazy at the Villa Arson in Nice, France, 2007, 'If the Hippies Cut Their Hair, I Don't Care, I Don't Care' at Galerie Michael Hall, Vienna, 'Play it as it Lays: 17 Artists from Los Angeles' at The London Institute, London, and the 2001 Tirana Biennial in Albania.

== The Los Angeles Museum of Art ==
Founded in 2012 by Alice Könitz, The Los Angeles Museum of Art (LAMOA) is an experimental exhibition space that the artist describes as a "platform for an organic institution that lives through participation." In 2014, The Los Angeles Museum of Art was included in the Hammer Museum's biennial Made in L.A 2014, winning the Mohn Award.
