= Alice Lau (disambiguation) =

Alice Lau is a Malaysian politician.

Alice Lau may also refer to:

- Alice Lau (actress), Hong Kong stage performing artist; see I Have a Date with Spring
- Alice Lau (civil servant), former Commissioner of Inland Revenue of Hong Kong; see Hong Kong order of precedence
