= 'Aliki =

Term to denote social rank in Polynesian culture

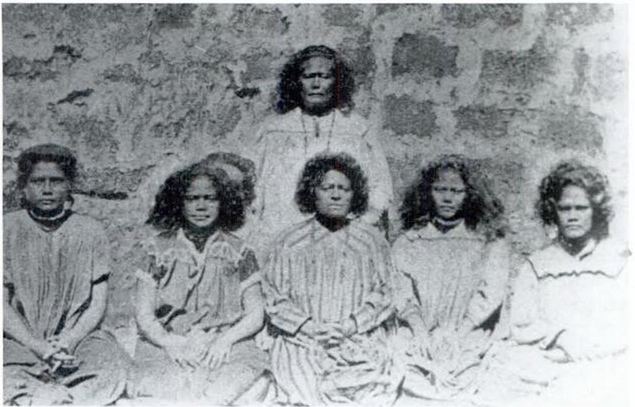
Queen Amélia (center, second row) in 1887 with young 'aliki girls in front of the Royal Palace of Wallis.

'Aliki is a term in the Wallisian and Futunan Polynesian languages that refers to a category of people related to the chieftaincy of Wallis and Futuna and its members. In English, it is often translated as "noble" or "nobility," though this is an imperfect translation.

== Terminology ==
The term 'aliki has several meanings. Generally, it means "of a higher order" or "above the common people". It refers to a title of nobility, the descendants of customary kings, and the aristocratic order formed by these individuals. The translation of 'aliki into English can only be approximate, as there is no equivalent status in the Western world. While it is similar to a title of nobility, there are still differences compared to the Western context. Anthropologist Sophie Chave-Dartoen defines it as follows:

a title that, inherited from a prestigious ancestor, grants authority, responsibilities, and privileges to its holder [...] The title is given by the "elders" of the descent group to the one who is considered the most worthy and capable of serving the community.

While the genealogical link to a founding ancestor of a lineage is very important, the personal abilities of an 'aliki are also taken into account; in cases of unrest causing dissatisfaction among the population with the person, they can be deposed.

Depending on the role one holds in this social organization, the term 'aliki may be accompanied by different particles, such as 'aliki hau for the customary king or 'aliki fau to refer to the king's advisors. This allows distinctions to be made regarding the social scale. Among the 'aliki, some people are designated by the royal families to be customary kings: the Lavelua in Uvea, the Tu'i Sigave and the Tuiagaifo in Futuna.

Wallisian and Futunan society is divided between the 'aliki category and the tua (which could be translated as "commoners"), the latter being at the bottom of the social scale.

Since the Christianization of Wallis and Futuna in the 1840s, the term 'Aliki (with a capital A) also refers to God; it is translated as "Lord" in English.

== History ==
Before the Christianization of the islands in the 1840s, the 'aliki were a true aristocratic order above the rest of the population. Men were called tama‘aliki and women fine‘aliki. They married among themselves and did not mix with the rest of the population. These customary chiefs 'aliki were often in competition or even in conflict with each other.

Upon the arrival of the Marist Fathers in 1837 in Wallis, the Lavelua (customary king) Soane Patita Vaimua relied on the Catholic clergy to strengthen his authority. The bishop (Pierre Bataillon) became second after the Lavelua, and gradually, the 'aliki lost their prerogatives (notably polygamy). Mixed marriages were allowed to weaken the local aristocracy and level social differences, as many Wallisians could now claim royal ancestry. The Bataillon Code, enacted in 1871, formalized the organization of the chieftaincy following the model of the French monarchy and established Christian-inspired rules.

== Hierarchy ==
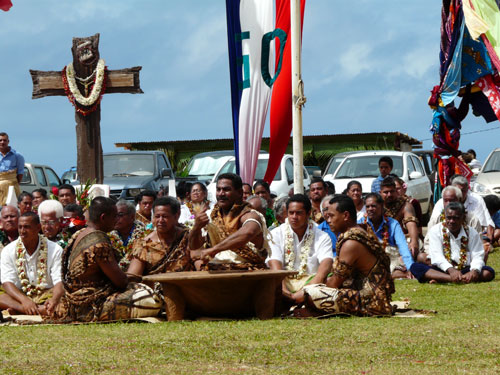
The seating position during the katoaga ceremony depends on the hierarchy as an 'aliki.

The customary kings of Wallis and Futuna ('aliki hau), at the top of the hierarchy, are surrounded by a court including counselors, ministers, 'aliki or nobles, and the king's family. (Note: Anthropologist Françoise Douaire-Marsaudon considers "noble" an improper translation of the word aliki.) This group of people holds an important place in the customary hierarchy. The 'aliki can be customary ministers (kau ’aliki), former kings, district and village chiefs, and also members of the territorial assembly. In Futuna, one attains the title of 'aliki through a rite called the Kava rite in reference to this plant, symbolic in the customary world. This group advises the king in his decisions and keeps him informed of the kingdom's affairs. The 'aliki do not retain this status for life because kings change, and courts are then renewed. Only former customary kings retain this title until their death. These titles are also found in the family names of some former kings, such as Amelia Tokagahahau Aliki.

Royal families also have a specific status. A family is called Fono Aliki, meaning "important family" or "royal family," if one of its members has previously held the royal crown. These families are present in the three kingdoms (Uvea, Alo, and Sigave), and each king belongs to one or two families comparable to clans. It is among these powerful clans that the royal throne or the kingdom's most important tasks are shared. Being part of a Fono Aliki grants a respected status throughout the kingdom, leading to significant competition to have a family member elected as a customary king. The royal family, whose member is currently king, is part of his court. For example, King Tomasi Kulimoetoke was part of the Takumasiva clan, and his family held the throne for 48 years.
