= Alice Harvie Duden =

American dentist

Alice Gertrude Harvie Duden (1873–1926) became the first woman lecturer at the Indiana Dental College in Indianapolis in 1908. She lectured about oral prophylaxis, a teeth cleaning procedure. Her research focused on the link between oral hygiene and kidney disease. Born in Great Britain, she emigrated to the United States in the 1890s, alongside her sister Marion Harvie Barnard, and began working for a Dr. Brackett in a dental lab in Newport, Rhode Island. She attended the Philadelphia Dental College for three years and worked in Boston before establishing a dental practice in New Hampshire. Following her marriage in 1907 to Hans Duden, a German-born chemist who was working in Indianapolis, she moved her dental practice to Indianapolis in 1909.
