= Alice Ngayu Lai =

Hong Kong artist (born 1976)

Alice Nga Yu LAI (賴雅如) is a Hong Kong artist specialized in painting and installation art.

She was born in 1976 in Hong Kong. Alice attended the University of California, Davis, USA from 1998 to 1999 through an Education Abroad programm, and also pursued a Degree in Fine Arts in The Chinese University of Hong Kong from 2000. She studied at the University of Leeds, MA in Fine Art in 2005 to 2006 on a Hong Kong Arts Development Council, FCO Chevening scholarships. She worked as an art administrator at the Hong Kong Museum of Art and Art in Hospital after graduation.

Exhibitions

Year	group/solo	exhibition name	venue
2013	Group	ARTram Shelters	Wan Chai tram station, Hong Kong
2013	Group	One Day...	Red Elation Gallery, Hong Kong
2013	Group	Tai Gang Yi Yuan	The National Sun Yat-Sen Memorial Hall, Taipei
2011	Group	Touching Art: Louvre's Sculptures in Movement- Artist response section “Dimension of Touching”	Hong Kong Museum of Art, Hong Kong
2009	Individual	Artists in the Neighbourhood Scheme IV: Ordinary Game	Hong Kong Central Library, Hong Kong
	Individual	Blossoms & Raindrops: Painting Exhibition	Gallery by the Harbour, Hong Kong
2008	Individual	Floating	Stage 1 Art Space, Hong Kong
2008	Group	Artists in the Neighbourhood Scheme IV Launching Exhibition	Exhibition Hall, Hong Kong City Hall Low Block, Hong Kong
2007	Group	Big Happy Heart	Exhibition Gallery, Tsuen Wan Town Hall & Yau Tong MTR station, Hong Kong
2006	Group	Fouroom	
2004	Group	Fotanian 2004: Open Studio	Yue Cheung Centre, Wah Luen Industrial Centre, Goldfield Industrial Centre, Hong Kong
2003	Group	Dream Garden – Art & Environment Programme	
2003	Group	An Exhibition of A To Z	
2000	Group	Berlin in Hong Kong – MTR Roving Art – "Test Tube Bears"	Admiralty station, Hong Kong
