= Alice Kasai =

Japense-American civil rights activist

Alice Fumiyo Kasai (September 17, 1916 – January 6, 2007) was a Japanese-American civil rights leader in Utah who advocated for Japanese Americans and other disenfranchised groups.

== Biography ==
Born in Seattle, Washington on September 17, 1916, Kasai was the child of Japanese immigrants. As a young child she was sent to live with her grandmother in Japan until she was six years old, before rejoining her family who had moved to Utah. Kasai graduated from Carbon High School in 1935, and married Henry Kasai two years after. During World War II, her husband was arrested and placed in a Japanese American internment camp.

== Work ==
After her husband was sent to an internment camp, Kasai became the first woman president of the Japanese American Citizens League (JACL) in Salt Lake City, Utah. In 1983, the JACL awarded Kasai awarded her a medallion for 60 years of service.

She also served as President of the Utah United Nations between 1985 and 1988.

== Death ==
Kasai died on January 6, 2007 in Salt Lake City. Graveside services was held Tuesday, January 9 at Redwood Memorial Cemetery.

== Additional Resources ==
Interviews with Japanese in Utah: Alice Kasai, University of Utah
