= Alice Maude-Roxby =

British multidisciplinary artist

Alice Maude-Roxby (born 1963) is an English multidisciplinary artist known for her fine art, photography, curation and authorship.

== Biography ==
Maude-Roxby was born in London and did a foundation course at Brighton Polytechnic during 1981 and 1982 and took a fine art degree at the school of sculpture at Newcastle-upon-Tyne Polytechnic between 1982 and 1985. She studied at the Kunstakademiet in Trondheim in Norway during 1989 and 1990 before shifting her educational focus onto photography in Berlin where she studied under Dieter Appelt at the Hochschule der Kunste in 1990 and 1991. Grants and scholarships awarded to Maude-Roxby allowed her to research and create artworks internationally with various institutions and art councils. Her work has been exhibited throughout the UK and Europe, including at the Victoria and Albert Museum in London. A current Fine Art Programme Leader at Middlesex University, Maude-Roxby has previously taught at Winchester School of Art, Sheffield Hallam University, Kingston University and Falmouth University. Much of her work is focused on the position of the photographer when creating artworks and the collaborative process of photographer and live artist. Her creative process has been described as the utilisation of 'live' and 'site specific' investigations such as interview and the examination of archives.

== Works ==
- Maude-Roxby, A., O'Dell, K. and Clausen, B. (2008). Live art on camera: performance and photography. Southampton, UK : John Hansard Gallery. 154p.
- Maude-Roxby, A. (2014). Anti-academy. John Hansard Gallery: UK.
- Maude-Roxby, A. (2003) Lost properties. London, U.K. : England & Co.
- Maude-Roxby, A. (2003) The delicate art of documenting performance. In: George, Adrian, (ed.) Art, lies and videotape: exposing performance. London, UK : Tate Publications. pp. 66–78.
- Maude-Roxby, A. (2004) On Record: Advertising, Architecture and the Actions of Gina Pane. Artwords Press: London.
- Maude-Roxby, A. (2009) 12 approaches to 12 shooters. In: Maizlish, J, (ed.) Marcia Farquhar's 12 shooters. London, UK : Live Art Development Agency. pp. 177–190
- Maude-Roxby, A. (2015). Past- Present- Future. In: Double Exposures: Performance as photography, photography as performance. In; Vason, M. and Evans, D. (eds) Intellect with Live Art Development agency. London, pp. 31–34.
