= Alice O'Malley =

American photographer (born 1962)

Alice O’Malley (born 1962) is an American photographer. She is known for her queer portraits, and is a self-taught photographer based in New York City.

== Life and career ==
O'Malley was born in 1962, in Buffalo, New York.

Her photography work showcases queer artists and residents of Manhattan's Lower East Side, shot in her studio on black and white film. O'Malley is a teacher at International Center of Photography. Her work has also been published in The New Yorker, Vogue and The New York Times Style Magazine.

Her work was part of the large group exhibit, a field of bloom and hum (2025) at The Frances Young Tang Teaching Museum and Art Gallery at Skidmore College in Saratoga Springs, New York, organized by Ian Berry.

O'Malley's work is in museum collections, the piece titled Kenny and Sabrina, NYC 2004 (2007) is part of the collection at the Philadelphia Museum of Art; and the gelatin silver print on paper titled Self Portrait, New York (2002) is part of the collection at Burchfield Penney Art Center at Buffalo State University.

== Publications ==
- O'Malley, Alice; Gangitano, Lia; Myles, Eileen; Anohni (2008). Alice O'Malley: Community of Elsewheres (exhibition catalogue). Isis Gallery (London), Participant Inc. (New York City). Isis Editions. ISBN 978-0955877414.
