= Alice M. Dimick =

American mathematician (1878–1956)

- Born: Alice Madeleine Elsie McKelden; December 6, 1878; Washington, D.C.
- Died: July 13, 1956 (aged 77); Tryon, North Carolina
- Burial place: Arlington National Cemetery
- Education: Columbian University; University of Pennsylvania
- Occupation: Mathematician
- Known for: Earning her PhD before the 1940s
- Spouse: Chester Edward Dimick

Alice M. Dimick (1878–1956) (née McKelden), was an American mathematician and one of the few women in the United States to earn a doctorate in mathematics before World War II.

== Biography ==
Alice Madeleine Elsie McKelden was born to Alice Maria McIntosh and William Blagrove McKelden in Washington, D.C., on December 6, 1878, as the seventh of the family's nine children.

=== Education ===
Alice McKelden graduated from Central High School in Washington, D.C., in 1895. After taking a competitive examination, she won a four-year scholarship to Columbian University (now called George Washington University) where she graduated in 1899 with awards in mathematics and Greek. That same year, she enrolled at the University of Pennsylvania in Philadelphia to study mathematics. During that 1899 school year, she took seven courses in mathematics, six in Greek, and one in classical philology, and she passed written examinations in Greek, modern analytical geometry, and complex variables before receiving her master's degree in 1900. During the summer session of 1901, McKelden studied at Harvard followed the next year with enrollment at Johns Hopkins University in Baltimore, although her coursework there remains unknown. In 1902–1903 and 1903–1904, McKelden completed two fellowships at the University of Pennsylvania and finished her PhD studies there in 1905 submitting a dissertation that described the theory of finite groups, supervised by George Hervey Hallett Sr. Like many other women who had earned doctorates at that time, McKelden's advanced degree merely qualified her to become a secondary school teacher in at least one preparatory school and at the Philadelphia High School for Girls.

=== Marriage ===
On June 12, 1907, she married Chester Edward Dimick (1880–1956) and she took the name Alice M. Dimick. The couple never had children. Chester was a mathematics professor and dean and became a faculty member at the school that later became the United States Coast Guard Academy (USCG), located in Maryland before moving to its current place New London, Connecticut. In 1944, Alice funded a mathematics award in Chester's name, and Dimick Hall on the academy's campus is named for him.

During the ensuing years, Alice sometimes worked as a substitute teacher in the New London High School and was a private tutor, but for the most part, she volunteered with social, church, and civic activities. She belonged to the social sorority Kappa Kappa Gamma and was a member of its subgroup of alumnae whose husbands, like hers, served in the US armed forces. She also belonged to the Daughters of the American Revolution, the International Association of University Women, and was involved with the YWCA.

=== Later years ===
In 1951, the local newspaper in Tryon, North Carolina, announced that Alice had assembled a class reunion of the 1899 graduates from Columbian University, but only 8 of the class of 21 were represented.

Alice Dimick died July 13, 1956, in Tryon, and was buried in Arlington National Cemetery in Washington, D.C. with her husband, Chester Dimick USCG (retired), who had died only six months before.
