= Joachim von Seewitz =

German dancer

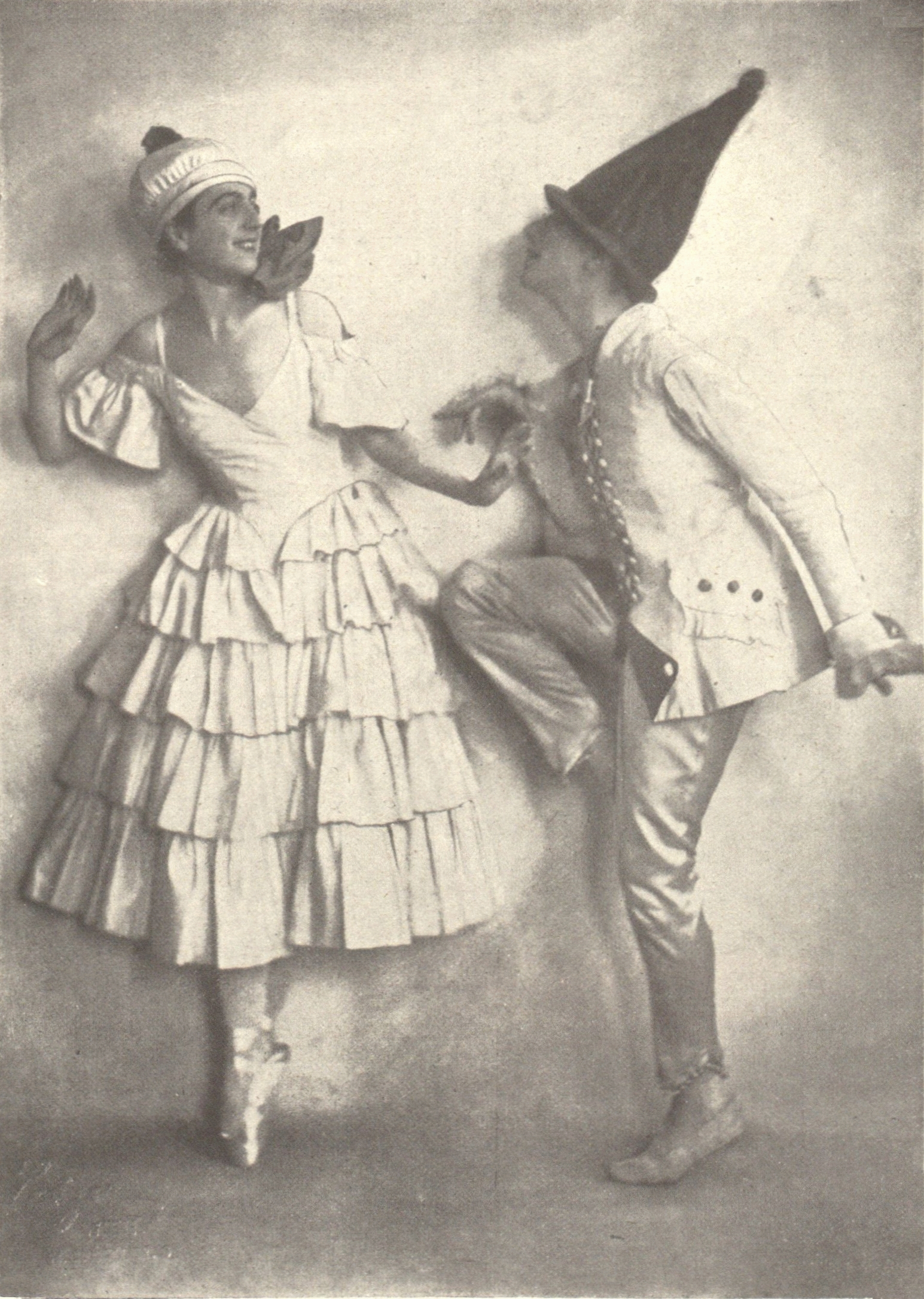
Lo Hesse and Joachim von Seewitz (by FX Setzer in Sport & Salon, 1918)

Joachim von Seewitz (full name: Joachim Wilhelm Friedrich Carl Oscar von Brüsewitz, born 15 August 1891 in Karlsruhe; died 23 February 1966 in Hückeswagen) was a German podium dancer.

== Biography ==
His father was the captain of the 1st Badische Leib Grenadier Regiment No 109, Hans von Brüsewitz (1853–1919), who later became lieutenant general and his wife Emmy (née Luchtenberg) (1864–1948); he married with one of the granddaughters of the Hückeswagen cloth manufacturer Justus Friedrich Wilhelm Bockhacker (1797–1872).

Joachim began to dance in Munich in 1913 and performed under the name of Joachim von Seewitz. In 1919, Richard Strauss recommended him and his dance partner Lo Hesse to the Vienna State Opera. Both decided to renounce this in order to tour South America. In 1921, the dancer made several promotional drama films with FW Koebler, the director of the Berlin Clarisse Ballet, as part of the opening credits for major feature films. In 1934 he was the first solo dancer in the newly founded Berlin Florence Ballet. As a dancer, he was photographed in an expressive style by the Berlin photographer Frieda Riess.

After the end of his career as a dancer, he returned to his parents in Bachstr. 26 back in Hückeswagen. He was active as a leader of the local cultural community. He was buried in the family grave of Brüsewitz. His main estate is in the German Dance Archive Cologne.

== Works ==
- The dream of the Torero, commercial 1921
