= Organizational-Activational Hypothesis =

The Organizational-Activational Hypothesis states that steroid hormones permanently organize the nervous system during early development, which is reflected in adult male or female typical behaviors. In adulthood, the same steroid hormones activate, modulate, and inhibit these behaviors. This idea was revolutionary when first published in 1959 because no other previous experiment had demonstrated that adult behaviors could be determined hormonally during early development.

The Phoenix et al. study sought to discover whether gonadal hormones given during the prenatal period had organizing effects on guinea pigs’ reproductive behavior. It was found that when female controls, gonadectomized (removal of gonads) females, hermaphrodites, and castrated males were injected prenatally with testosterone propionate, the mean number of mounts increased. This increase in male-typical reproductive behavior shows that prenatal androgens have a masculinizing effect. Moreover, the organizing effects of hormones can have permanent effects. Phoenix et al. found that females injected with testosterone propionate while pregnant, instead of neonatally, did not have any effect on lordosis. This demonstrates that when testosterone is given postnatally in females, there may not be lasting effects as compared to prenatally administered testosterone. The data from this study supports the organizational hypothesis that states when androgens are given prenatally there is an organizing effect on sexual behavior, permanently altering normal female mating behavior as adults.

== Mechanisms in sexual differentiation ==
Sexual behavior in rats is organized prenatally and activated with steroids hormones in adulthood. In males high levels of testosterone produced by testes and travel to the brain. Here, testosterone is aromatized to an estradiol and masculinizes and defeminizes the brain. Thus, estradiol is responsible for many male-typical behavior. In females, the ovaries produce large amounts of estrogen during gestation. Rats have alpha-fetoprotein that binds to the estrogen before it can reach the brain. The estrogen is eventually metabolized in the liver. This protein has a low affinity for androgens. Therefore, testosterone can reach the brain without being taken up by alpha-fetoprotein. Due to fact that males have different levels of androgens in the brain, this can lead to organizing effects from androgen exposure with the expression of masculine behaviour.

== Main points of organizational-activational theory ==
The organizational-activational theory has three main components.

1. Organizational effects are permanent. A study by Gomes et al. showed that organizational effects can last a lifetime. Newborn female mice were exposed to either endured one minute of the neonatal handling stress procedure for the first ten days postpartum or were not handled at all. As adults, sexual receptiveness was recorded and handled female mice showed less lordosis than non-handled female mice and had less serum progesterone. Neonatal handling not only affected reproductive behavior, but also affected sympathetic nerve activity and glucocorticoid levels into adulthood, indicating that emotional stress during developmentally sensitive periods can permanently change behavior.
2. Organizational effects occur just prior to or after birth, but before neural tissues have matured. Gorski et al. demonstrated the importance of the timing of hormonal influence in a study involving rats and the size of their medial preoptic nucleus (MPON). MPON size is a sexually dimorphic trait in that the MPON of male rats is larger than the MPON of female rats. But when male rats were castrated neonatally, their MPON was significantly smaller than male rats that were castrated after their brains were sexually differentiated. Despite both groups of males being castrated, the timing of the castration affected MPON size, indicating that organizational effects occur prior to maturation of neural tissues.
3. Organizational effects take place during a critical period. Results from studies indicate that organizational effects are maximized during sensitive periods of brain development. One critical period is weeks 8-24 of gestation. Another sensitive period shortly after birth may exist with a peak in testosterone in male infants during postnatal months 1–5. Auyeung et al. tested for an association between fetal and postnatal testosterone and autism in children. The results supported the idea that there is a critical period during which organizational effects occur. Fetal testosterone levels (taken from amniotic fluid during second trimester amniocentesis) and postnatal testosterone levels (from 18- to 24-month-olds' saliva) were compared with the Quantitative Checklist for Autism in Toddlers (Q-CHAT), a measure of autistic traits in children. The authors found that only fetal testosterone was positively associated with Q-CHAT scores, signifying that fetal testosterone exposure during the critical period for sexual differentiation of the brain is associated with the development of autistic traits whereas postnatal androgens are not.

== Evidence ==
=== Facts of 2D:4D ratio ===
Finger ratio has been examined in relation to a number of physical traits that show sex differences and evidence suggests it is influenced by the prenatal environment, although there is no direct evidence for the latter. Studies in men have been motivated by two conflicting hypotheses. On the one hand, homosexual men were hypothesized to be exposed to high levels of testosterone in utero, which would be associated with a lower 2D:4D ratio than that found in heterosexual men. On the other hand, homosexual men have been hypothesized to have low prenatal testosterone exposure.

=== Ovulation and gonadal secretion ===
The hormonal control of ovulation is also related to the organizational/activational hypothesis. Both males and females rats exhibit luteinizing hormone (LH) pulses in which LH is released from the anterior pituitary due to the secretion of gonadotropin releasing hormone (GnRH) from the hypothalamus. Females, however, show an increase in LH pulse frequency around ovulation due to the positive feedback mechanism. When estrogen is increased in the blood, the anteroventral periventricular nucleus (AVPV) of the hypothalamus causes the release of GnRH. The GnRH surge brings about a surge in LH and follicle stimulating hormone (FSH). Since females have a cyclic gonadal function, there may be a sexual dimorphism in the gonadal secretion. When female rats are injected with testosterone there is no positive feedback occurring and no LH surge. Moreover, castrated males will exhibit LH surges, similar to female cyclic gonadal behavior.

== Sources ==
- Phoenix CH, Goy RW, Gerall AA, Young WC. Organizing action of prenatally administered testosterone propionate on the tissues mediating mating behavior in the female guinea pig. Endocrinology. 1959;65:369–382.
- Nelson, R. An Introduction to Behavioral Endocrinology (4th ed.). Sunderland, Mass.: Sinauer Associates. 1995. Print.
- Wallen, Kim. “The Organizational Hypothesis: Reflections on the 50th anniversary of the publication of Phoenix, Goy, Geral, and Young (1959).” Hormones and Behavior. 561. Web. 24 Mar. 2015.
- Arnold A. (1985) “Organizational and activational effects of sex steroids on brain and behavior: a reanalysis.” Hormones and Behavior. 469–498. Web. 24 Mar. 2015
- Gomes C. (2012). “Neonatal handling induces alteration in progesterone secretion after sexual behavior but not in angiotensin II receptor density in the medial amygdala: implications for reproductive success.” Life Sciences. 2867–2871. Web. 24 Mar. 2015.
- Nugent BM. (2012). “Hormonal Programming Across the Lifespan.” Hormone and Metabolic Research. 577–586. Web. 24 Mar. 2015
- Gorski R. (1978). “Evidence for a morphological sex difference within the medial preoptic area of the rat brain.” Brain Research. 333–346. Web. 24 Mar. 2015.
- Auyeung B. (2012). “Prenatal versus postnatal sex steroid hormone effects on autistic traits in children at 18 to 24 months of age.” Molecular Autism.17. Web. 24 Mar. 2015.
- Nottebohm F. (1980). “Testosterone triggers growth of brain vocal control nuclei in adult female canaries.” Brain Res.429-436. Web. 24 Mar. 2015.
