= Alice Cohn =

German-Jewish graphic artist and forger

- Born: 1914; Breslau
- Died: 2000 (aged 85–86)
- Occupations: Graphic artist; master forger
- Known for: Forgery in the Dutch Resistance
- Spouse: Rudolf Bermann (m. 1947)
- Children: 2

Alice Cohn (1914–2000) was a German-Jewish graphic artist and master forger for the Dutch resistance during World War II.

== Career ==
Cohn left Lichtenstein in 1936, to live in the Netherlands on a student visa. Initially settling in Amsterdam, Cohn learned Dutch and worked on commission creating cinema posters and children's toys.

At the beginning of the war, Cohn found a position with Amsterdam's Jewish Council as a doctor's assistant, which granted her more freedom than other Jewish residents. She used this freedom to rescue a 3-year-old child. Léonie de Picciotto, (Note: Léonie de Picciotto is referred to as Lonnie Lesser in most source material.) an International Council of Jewish Women's United Nations representative, recalls Cohn leading her out of the nursery at Plantage Middenlaan Street in her nurse's uniform. After seeing the child to safety, she fled to Utrecht, going into hiding in an attic in Wilhelmina Park. The rescued child was eventually reunited with her parents, thanks to forged passports.

In 1947, she returned to Lichtenstein, and continued her graphic arts career, designing children's books, posters and toys.

=== Dutch Resistance ===
Once in Utrecht, she founded the Forgery Agency with Rutger Mathijssen and Siem Buddingh. In 1941, after the German invasion of the Netherlands, identity cards signifying Jewish status became compulsory for anyone over the age of 14. A civil servant of the Ministry of the Interior, Jacob Lentz, developed a sophisticated identity card, the first to have a photograph, a fingerprint of its holder, and, for Jewish residents, a large letter J. Despite the belief that Lentz' persoonsbewijs (PB), as he named them, would be impossible to forge, Cohn was able to create some of the only identity cards that surpassed Nazi scrutiny. The agency referred to the forged documents they created, including PB's, food stamps, and other important documents imperative to survival as wild papers. Her and her co-resisters, called The Utrecht Children's Committee, rescued hundreds of Jews from being deported to Nazi concentration camps and genocide.

During the war's final year, 1945, Cohn's forgery work helped prevent young Dutch men from being sent to Germany as forced laborers.

In 2017, Cohn became the first Liechtenstein citizen to receive the Jewish Rescuer's Citation award. The award was given posthumously to Cohn, along with Mathijssen and Buddingh, by B'nai B'rith for rescuing Picciotto and for their work forging documents. Cohn's daughter still has much of her tools, including a notebook containing exercises for forging a signature, and donated the collection temporarily for display at the National Holocaust Museum in Amsterdam.

== Personal life ==
Cohn was born in Breslau in 1914.

After liberation, Cohn learned that all of her relatives from Breslau had been murdered, including her parents. As she moved forward in her career, Cohn began obtaining fabrics from a Lichtenstein-based merchant named Rudolf Bermann. They married in 1947, and had two children, a son and a daughter.

Cohn died in 2000.
