= Alice Elinor Lambert =

American novelist (1886–1981)

- Born: 1886; Corvallis, Oregon, US
- Died: 1981 (aged 94–95); Marysville, Washington, US
- Occupation: Romance novelist

Alice Elinor Lambert (1886–1981) was an American romance writer.

== Biography ==
Lambert was born in Corvallis, Oregon, in 1886. Her father, Charles Edward Lambert, was born in Ireland in 1843. He came to the United States prior to the Civil War and enlisted to be a Union Soldier. After the war, he became a missionary. In 1876, he married Ella Amelia Northrup in Lafayette, Indiana. Her father, Samuel Lathrop, was the first Methodist missionary bishop in Montana. After living and teaching in Indiana, they moved to Salem, Oregon where he was the president of Willamette University. In 1886 he became a Congregational minister in Yaquina City, Oregon. There were six other children in the family with Alice being the middle child. In 1896, they moved to Tacoma, Washington and later to Seattle, Washington.

In 1904, she enjoyed a brief summer romance with Canadian landscape painter Tom Thomson. Thomson was quiet, but Lambert would later write, "We knew without words that we loved each other. We had ESP, hardly needing words, and I know he felt the same towards me." Despite this, she laughingly rejected his marriage proposal.

Lambert later became a writer; in her 1934 self-published novel, Woman Are Like That, she describes a young girl who refuses an artist's proposal and later regrets her decision. Specifically, the main character, Miss Juliet Delany, remembers,

For one disturbing year she had been desperately in love with a tall, dark boy named Tom, a commercial artist, who in the summer used to take her on streetcar rides to Alki Point and in the wintertime to the dusty dimness of the public library, where he would pore over prints and reproductions of the masters. When finally, darkly morose and determined to succeed, Tom had gone east, the girl, unversed as she was in the art of pursuit and capture, had let him go, powerless to hold him back... When later she learned that Tom had been drowned while on a sketching trip in Canada, she sealed up a section of her heart, never again to open it. Tom had been tall and slender, with thin, nervous hands and flashing eyes. Instinctively, since his death, Juliet had avoided men of similar build and appearance.

Reports conflict about whether or not Lambert ever married. David Silcox and Harold Town wrote that she never married, while Roy MacGregor wrote that she married a man and had two daughters with him.

She died in Marysville, Washington, in 1981, aged 95.
