= Alice Arnold Crawford =

American writer (1850–1874)

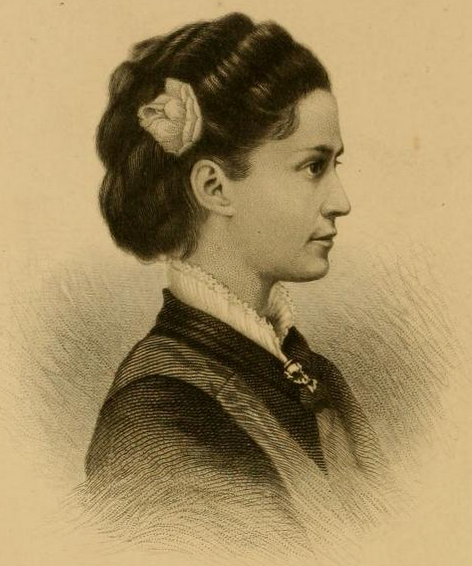
- Photo in A Woman of the Century
- Born: Alice Arnold; February 10, 1850; Fond du Lac, Wisconsin, U.S.
- Died: September 1874 (aged 24)
- Resting place: Fond du Lac, Wisconsin, U.S.
- Occupation: author
- Spouse: Charles A. Crawford (m. 1872)
- Writing career
- Language: English
- Genres: poetry; short stories
- Notable work: A Few Thoughts For a Few Friends

Signature
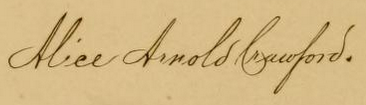

Alice Arnold Crawford (née, Arnold; February 10, 1850 – September 1874) was a 19th-century American author of poetry and short stories. She furnished articles in prose and verse for the leading publications of the day. After her death, an unedited collection of her writings, totaling almost two hundred pages, mostly in verse, was published in 1875 by Jansen, McClurg & Co., of Chicago.

== Biography ==
Alice Arnold was born in Fond du Lac, Wisconsin, on February 10, 1850. Her father died when she was four years old. At sixteen, she was graduated from the high school in Fond du Lac, with honors.

For several years after her graduation, she taught in the public school and gave lessons in music. At the same time, she wrote for the papers of her city, in one of which she had a regular department, besides furnishing several continued stories. Her poems and short sketches were published by various periodicals. When the Grand Duke Alexei Alexandrovich of Russia visited Milwaukee, Wisconsin, she was called upon and furnished the poem of welcome.

In September, 1872, she married Charles A. Crawford, a banker of Traverse City, Michigan, and that place was her home for two years before her death, which occurred in September, 1874. The year following, an edition of her poems was issued in Chicago, and a second edition was published a few years later. She was survived by a daughter. She was buried at Fond du Lac, Wisconsin.

== Selected works ==
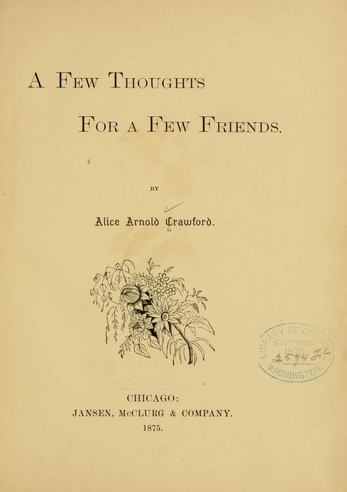
A Few Thoughts For a Few Friends

- A Few Thoughts For a Few Friends
