= Alice Halstedt =

American politician (1920–2012)

Member of the Connecticut House of Representatives from Cromwell
- In office 1963–1967 Serving with J. Frank Palmer
- Preceded by: J. Frank Palmer; John W. Bradley
- Succeeded by: Seat eliminated

Personal details
- Born: Alice Ruth Molander; May 31, 1920
- Died: June 18, 2012 (aged 92) Middletown, Connecticut, U.S.
- Party: Republican
- Spouse: Ernest Halstedt
- Children: 3
- Education: Russell Sage College; Gibbs College

Alice Ruth Halstedt (May 31, 1920 – June 18, 2012) was an American politician who served in the Connecticut House of Representatives from 1963 to 1967, representing the town of Cromwell as a Republican.

== Personal life ==
Alice Ruth Molander was born on May 31, 1920. She graduated from Northfield Seminary in Gill, Massachusetts, and later attended Russell Sage College and Gibbs College. She was married to Ernest Halstedt and had three children.

== Political career ==
Halstedt was elected to the Connecticut House of Representatives in 1962 and served until 1967, representing the town of Cromwell alongside J. Frank Palmer. She did not run for reelection in 1966 and had no successor as Connecticut's 1965 redistricting eliminated the use of single-town districts. In 1968, Halstedt ran to represent the 33rd district of the Connecticut State Senate, but was defeated by Democratic incumbent John F. Pickett.

== Death ==
Halstedt died on June 18, 2012, at Middlesex Hospital in Middletown, Connecticut. She was 92.
