= Alice G. McGee =

American lawyer

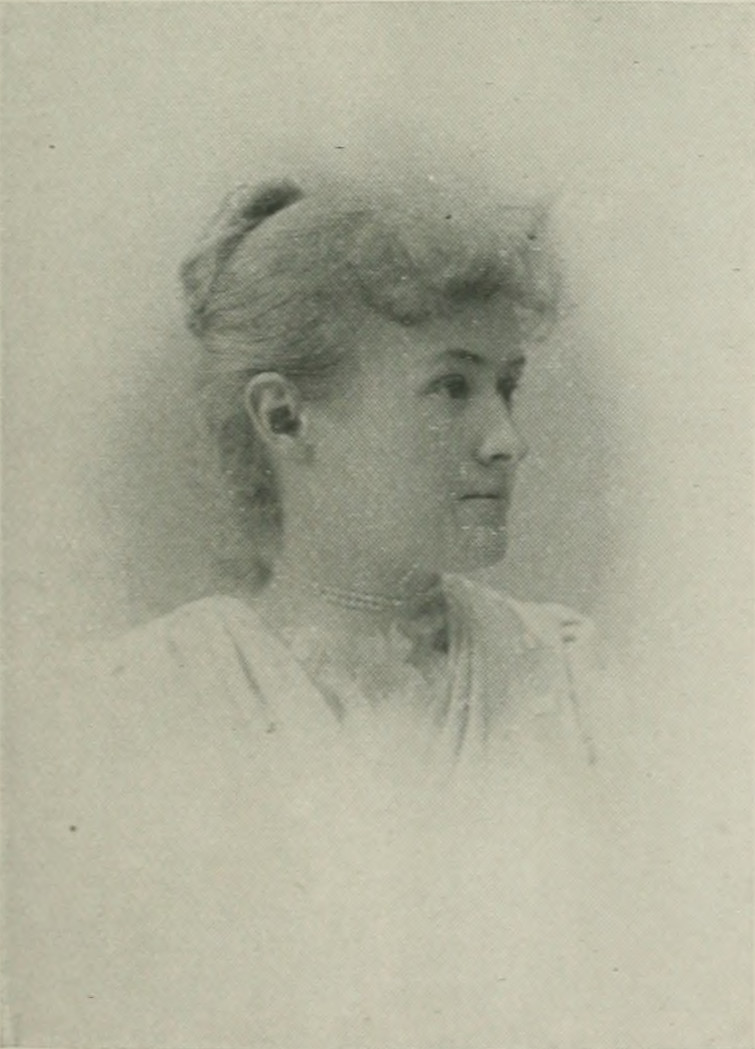
- Born: February 10, 1869; Warren, Pennsylvania, US
- Died: August 1, 1895 (aged 26)
- Known for: Second woman lawyer admitted to the Pennsylvania Bar

Alice G. McGee (1869–1895) was a lawyer included in A Woman of the Century and the second woman admitted to the Pennsylvania Bar, She was born in Warren, Pennsylvania and graduated from Warren High School in 1886. McGee studied for three years as a student in the law office of Wetmore, Noyes & Hinckley and was admitted to the Bar after she turned twenty-one on May 13, 1890.

== Early life ==
McGee was the only daughter of Joseph A. McGee and Catherine McGee and spent most of her life on a farm. She was educated in music and painting, which McGee had planned to pursue as a career. After graduating from Warren High School in 1886, she worked as a librarian and teacher.

== Gaining admission ==
In 1887, she decided to pursue a career in law, and by February 16, 1887, had registered as a student lawyer at Wetmore, Noyes & Hinckley, a prominent firm that had argued two cases in front of the Pennsylvania Supreme Court only a few years earlier.

On May 13, 1890, after McGee turned twenty-one, she was admitted to the Pennsylvania Bar by Judge Brown. McGee was only the second woman to be admitted to the Pennsylvania Bar after Caroline Burnham Kilgore, who persevered sixteen years before she became a recognized member of the Bar. McGee, on the other hand, only worked as a student lawyer for three years and did not attend law school before gaining admission.

McGee's assent from student lawyer to member of the Bar in three years was not only faster than other women at the time, but is also comparable to her male counterparts. Although law school was an option in 1890, law school was not required, and many were reluctant to admit women.

== As a lawyer and actor ==
Although McGee was a successful counselor and pleader, she found the practice of law slow and unprofitable, so she started an acting career, appearing in "The Queen of Sheba" in 1893–1894. She died at the age of twenty-six in 1895.
