= Alice Willard =

American journalist and businesswoman

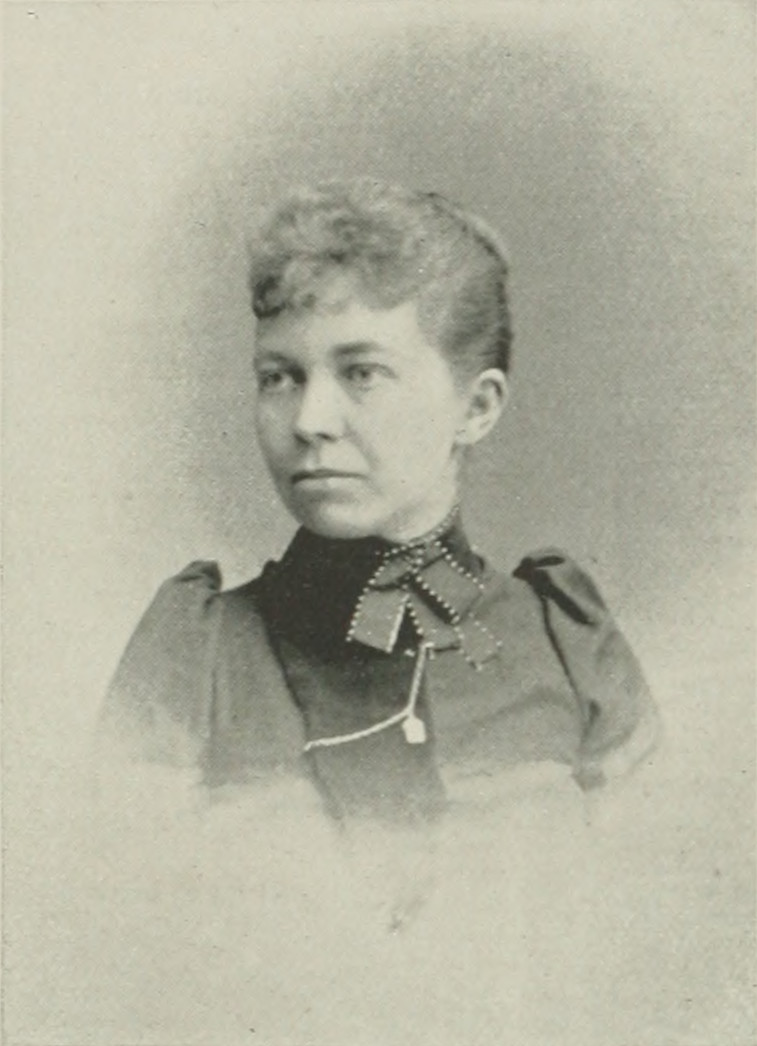
- "A Woman of the Century"
- Born: Alice Capitola Rosseter; April 13, 1860 near Nauvoo, Illinois, U.S.
- Died: February 12, 1936 (aged 75); Chicago, Illinois, U.S.
- Other name: Allie
- Occupations: journalist; newspaper editor; businesswoman
- Spouse: Osman Bailey Willard (m. 1881; died 1887)
- Writing career
- Notable works: "Our own lady", a sketch

Alice Capitola Willard (née Rosseter; April 13, 1860 – February 12, 1936) was an American journalist and businesswoman. She served as editor of the Times (Loup City, Nebraska), manager of the Woman's Signal (London), and managing editor of Woman's Signal Budget (London).

== Early life and education ==
Alice (nickname, "Allie") Capitola Rosseter was born near Nauvoo, Illinois, April 13, 1860, the oldest of ten children. Her parents were Cyrus E. Rosseter and Lydia A. (Williams) Rosseter. In 1872 the family removed to Grand Island, Nebraska, and from there to Loup City, Nebraska, in 1873, where the greater part of her early life was spent.

Willard's health was frail and was the cause for her to miss the advantages of a good education outside of the home. The extent of her opportunities was five summers in school until the age of 12, after which 15 months in school were added to her experience. At the age of 17, she had fitted herself to teach. Then she earned the means for a nine-months' course in an academy presided over by J. T. Mallalieu, of Kearney, Nebraska.

== Career ==
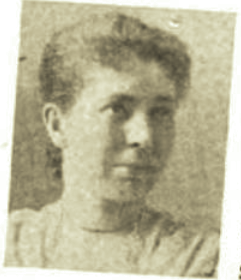
Allie Capitola Willard

She began her business career under the guidance of L. B. Fifield, of Kearney. She studied some months with Mr. Fifield, during which time she entered a printing office, where she worked at proof-reading, attended to the mail list, reviewed books, did paragraph editing and performed some of the outside business duties.

Appointed postmaster in Loup City at the age of 21, for five years she served the public in that capacity.

Since 1880, she was a constant writer for the press in the line of news articles, sketches, temperance reform, and politics.

In 1881, she married Osman Bailey Willard (1854–1887). He was a successful politician and newspaperman, under whose training she developed as a writer. The husband was assassinated in May 1887.

Prostrated for a time from the shock, Willard eventually rallied and took up her husband's work. As editor of the Loup City Times, she became a member of the Nebraska Editorial Association. She was also a member of the Nebraska Press Association.

During a part of the year 1889, she took a course in the business college of Lincoln, Nebraska, and served three months as clerk in the Nebraska State Senate. Late in 1889, she entered the employ of the Western Newspaper Union in Omaha, Nebraska. She was later manager of that company's Chicago office, but resigned because physically unable to bear the strain.

Willard was a member of the Woman's Christian Temperance Union (WCTU) and active in the temperance movement cause. In 1893, she went to Europe for study and travel. For 18 months, she was manager of the business office of Lady Henry Somerset's newspaper, The Woman's Signal, at Memorial Hall, London, England, in which city she also edited for a year The Woman's Signal Budget, the organ of the British Women's Temperance Association (BWTA) (now known as the White Ribbon Association).

In politics, she supported the Republican party. After 1896, and for several years, she was the secretary of the National Federation of Republican Women. In 1931, she published "Our own lady", a sketch (Chicago, P. F. Pettibone & company, 1931), a biography of Bertha Baur of Illinois.

== Personal life ==
A few years after his death, she paid debts of thousands of dollars which her husband's political career had entailed. She was not a member of any church.

Alice Capitola Rosseter Willard lived in Chicago for three decades before dying in that city's Mapletier Sanitarium, February 12, 1936.

== Selected works ==
- "Our own lady", a sketch (1931) (Text)
