= Maria Alice =

Maria Alice may also refer to a Portuguese fadista

Maria Alice de Fátima Rocha Silva (born 23 October 1971), better known as Maria Alice, is a Cape Verdean singer. In 2017 she was condecorated with the Praia Government Merit Medal

== Biography ==
She was born and raised on the island of Sal. Cape Verde's international airport is based on Sal, and her voice drew the attention of many Cape Verdean musicians who passed through the island on their way to and from Europe, America, and Africa. She soon moved to Lisbon, Portugal and began performing and recording with established artists such as the renowned clarinettist Luís Morais. She first sang at several Lisbon clubs including Ritz Club and B.Leza. Her first album was released in 1993 and was named Ilha d'Sal. Her second solo album D'zencontre was recorded in Lisbon in 1995 with top local musicians.

== Festivals ==
She appeared in numerous international festivals in France, the Netherlands, Spain, Greece, Italy, the USA, San Marino, Switzerland, and Germany. She also appeared at international expos including Expo 94 in Seville and Expo 98 in Lisbon and recently the Shanghai Expo, and at other festivals including the Montreal Jazz Festival, Festival de Santa Maria. She took part in a spectacle in honor of "Cesária Évora and Friends", which toured other countries including England, Switzerland, Sweden, Germany, France, China at the Shanghai Expo, etc. She recorded a CD in Paris. She sang in Moscow with Cesária Évora and took part in England in the Women of Cape Verde tournament with Lura and Nancy Vieira.

== Discography ==
- Ilha d'Sal (1993)
- D'Zemcontre (1998)
- Lágrima e Súplica (2002)
- Tocatina (2008)
