= Alice Jacobsen =

Chicago sculptor (1928–1993)

Alice "Zani" Jacobsen
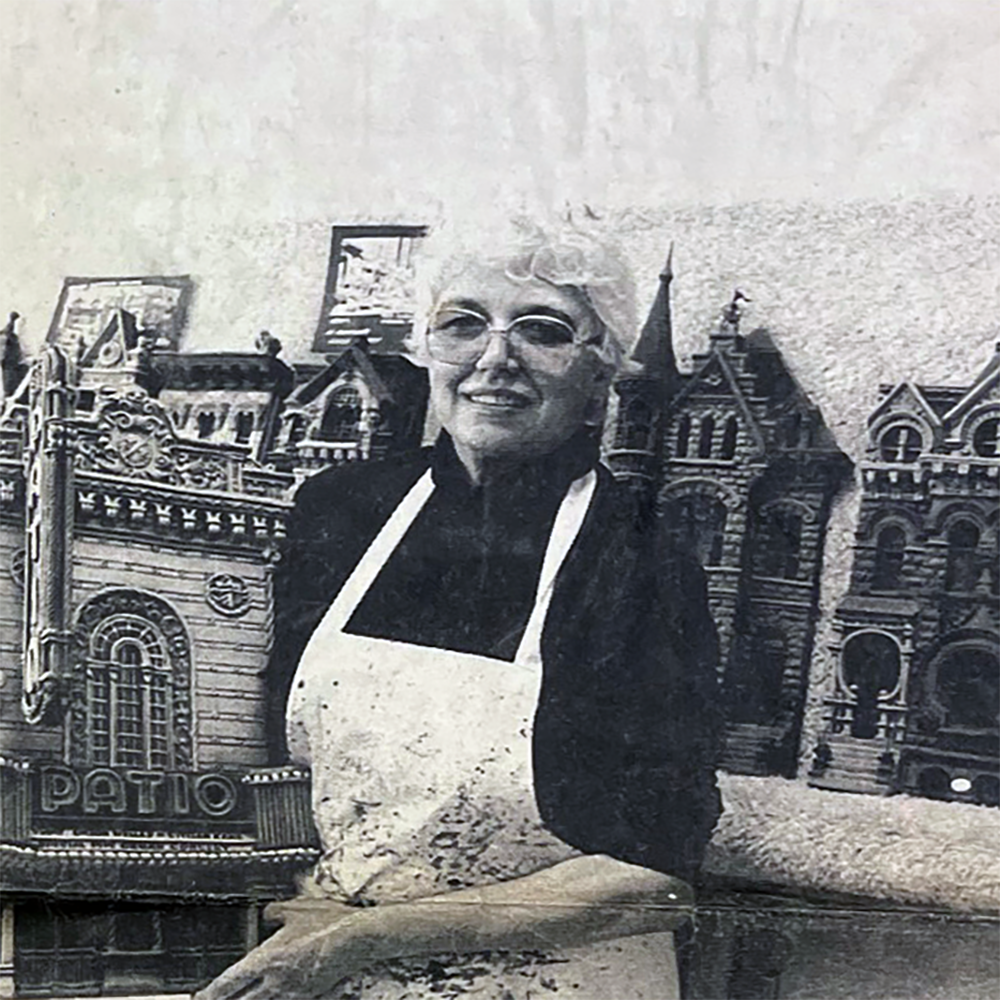
- Alice "Zani" Jacobsen
- Born: Alice Jacobsen; 1928
- Died: September 4, 1993 (aged 64–65)
- Education: School of the Art Institute of Chicago
- Known for: Sculpting plaster reliefs of Chicago architecture built in the middle to late 1800s and early 1900s
- Notable work: Chicago Water Tower, Comiskey Park, Riverview Amusement Park
- Spouse: Albert "Nix" Jacobsen

Alice "Zani" Jacobsen (1928–1993) was an American postwar and contemporary sculptor who resided on the North Side of Chicago. She is known for her plaster sculptural reliefs of buildings, structures, and famous landmarks that she felt "'represent an important Chicago style' or demonstrate an innovative solution to technical construction problems."

== Early life and education ==
Jacobsen was a graduate of the School of the Art Institute of Chicago (SAIC).

== Career ==
=== Subjects and style ===
Her subjects include local taverns, popular theaters, neighborhood fire stations, and private homes that were built in the middle to late 1800s and early 1900s and represent Victorian architecture. She depicted extant buildings in Logan Square, Humboldt Park, Wicker Park, Old Town Triangle, the Gold Coast, Prairie Avenue, Pilsen, Kenwood, Hyde Park, and Pullman neighborhoods. Some of her more popular subjects include the Chicago Water Tower, Riverview Amusement Park, and Comiskey Park.

=== Design process ===
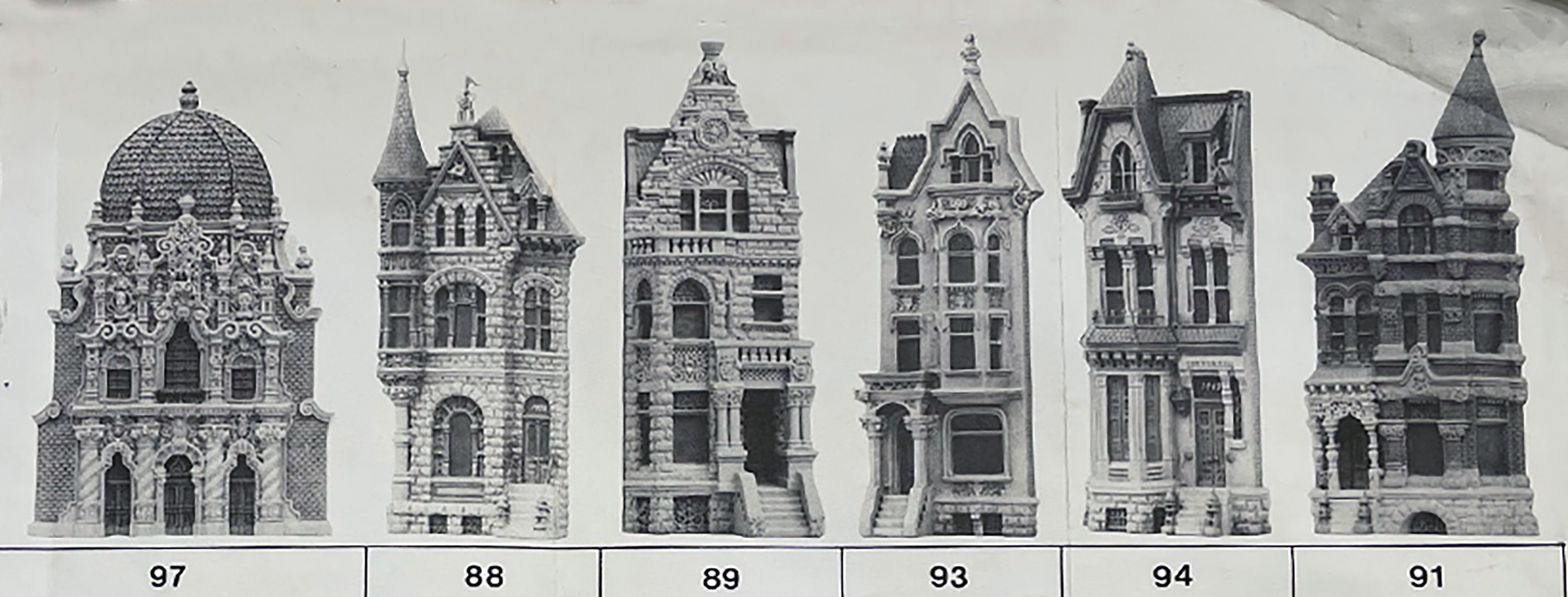
Alice "Zani" Jacobsen plaster reliefs

Jacobsen's design process started with her and her husband driving the streets of Chicago in search of potential subjects. They navigated their way through the city by using a grid map that distinguished the boundaries of the then 176 neighborhoods of Chicago. When she found a potential subject, she would photograph it in detail before using the photos as a reference to recreate an authentic scaled down version. Before starting any work, Jacobsen would thoroughly research each subject, including building styles and materials popular during that era. Her biggest source of information for this was The Chicago Historical Society, neighborhood groups, and local nostalgia enthusiasts.

When she began a new piece she sculpted a "master" or original model by using a wax-based clay. This was a tedious process; Zani frequently had to fill in visual blanks as subjects were often missing some of their original details due to theft and decay. In these instances she relied on structural advice from her husband, a carpenter, and on historical photographs of the neighborhood, utilizing information on similarly styled buildings to reconstruct the missing pieces. After completing the original model, she would create a latex mold to cast a limited edition run of models (often 10 to 40 castings). Zani used a gypsum cement to obtain an accurate reproduction, hand painting each piece in typical colors of the building materials used. After creating a limited number of copies she would destroy the mold.

=== Sales ===
Jacobsen's pieces were sold at Chicago's Gold Coast Art Fest and from her studio at 5005 W. Fullerton Ave. in Chicago.

== Notable works ==
Jacobsen sculpted the Belmont Theater, the Avalon Theater, and the Schootz Tied House.

Jacobsen's recreation of the Old Paradise and Chicago Theaters were featured in an exhibit at the Cooper Hewitt Smithsonian Design Museum in New York.

== Professional affiliations ==
She was a member of the Theatre Historical Society.

== Personal life and death ==
Alice "Zani" Jacobsen, 65, died September 4, 1993, of cancer at her home in Chicago. Survivors include her husband, Albert "Nix" Jacobsen; and two sisters.

== Archives ==
The Chicago Public Library holds an archive of her artist files under the name "Zani Jacobsen".
