= Alice Broad =

British printer (fl. 1661–1664)

Alice Broad (fl. 1661–1664), was the first female printer in York, England. She was also known as Alice Broade.

== Early life ==
Alice Broad was the assumed widow of Thomas Broad (seventeenth century York printer) and took over the family printing business on his death in 1661. The press was located opposite the Ye Olde Starre Inne on Stonegate, York.

Broad was York's first female printer, and indeed the only printer in York from 1661 to 1664. She remained the only female printer in the city for the duration of her career.

== Printed publications ==
Works produced by Broad included religious publications, instructional books, visitation articles, local interest and a range of other subjects.

The last extant printing is generally considered to be Scarbrough-Spaw, or a Description of the Nature and Vertues of the Spaw at Scarbrough, Yorkshire, published 1667. There is no definitive evidence of any further publications until the publication of Northumberland visitation articles followed by a book of poetry with John White in 1680. John White married Hannah, the assumed daughter of Alice in 1680.

York Minster Library houses eleven of the seventeen extant publications by Broad.

== Later life ==
Broad's tools and presses went with Hannah Broad into her marriage with John White.
