= Carl Richard Moore =

American endocrinologist

Carl Richard Moore (December 5, 1892 – October 16, 1955) was an American endocrinologist.

He was born in rural farm region of Greene County, Missouri, and received his early education in nearby Springfield. After graduating from High School, he attended Drury College where he acquired an interest in biology. In 1913, he obtained his B.S. degree, then worked as an assistant at Drury to earn his M.S. in 1914. With the granting of a fellowship, he attended the University of Chicago where he was awarded his Ph.D. in 1916, with a thesis on the fertilization and parthenogenesis in sea urchin eggs. He became an associate in the university's zoology department from 1916 to 1918, then an instructor, a full professor in 1928 and chairman of the department in 1934. He was married to Edith Naomi Abernethy in 1920.

Carl Moore is noted for his studies of the reproductive tract of male mammals and the physiology of spermatozoa. In 1929, Carl Moore, T. F. Gallagher and F. C. Koch became the first to extract the male sex hormone androsterone.

During his career, he served as vice president of the American Society of Zoologists (1926); president of Section F, the American Association for the Advancement of Science (1943) and president of the American Association for the Study of Internal Secretions 1944). He served as editor of the Biological Bulletin and the Physiological Zoology journals. In 1948 he was awarded an honorary Sc.D. by Drudy College in 1948. In 1941 he received the Francis Amory Award by the National Academy of Arts and Science. He received the award of the American Urological Association in 1950 and the Medal and Certificate of Award from the Endocrine Society in 1955.
