= Alice Avery =

New Zealand artist (1868–1957

- Born: Alice Lethbridge Perry; 2 September 1868; Masterton, New Zealand
- Died: 29 September 1957 (aged 89); Hastings, New Zealand
- Resting place: Havelock North Cemetery
- Spouse: Alfred Avery (m. 1895; died 1917)
- Children: 2

Alice Lethbridge Avery (née Perry; 2 September 1868 – 29 September 1957) was a New Zealand artist.

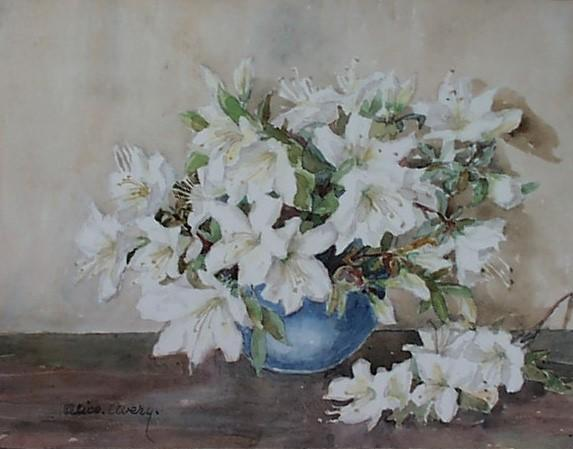
White Azaleas, painted by Avery

Avery was born Alice Lethbridge Perry in Masterton on 2 September 1868, the sixth daughter of Bennet Pascoe Perry and Mary Ann Perry (née Masters). On 18 September 1895, she married Alfred Avery, who worked for the Government Life Insurance Department, in Masterton. They had two sons, including Norman Alfred Avery. They lived in Napier and later in Hastings.

Avery exhibited at Auckland Society of Arts, Canterbury Society of Arts (1909 and 1925) and New Zealand Academy of Fine Arts (1905–1948). She exhibited at local clubs and societies, including the Masterton Sketch Club's annual exhibition, Havelock North Arts and Crafts exhibition, and the first exhibition of the Hawke's Bay Art Society. She sold four paintings at the New Zealand Academy of Fine Arts 1922 and 1930 exhibitions. Her artist files are held at Te Papa and one of her paintings is in MTG Hawke's Bay.

Her niece, Marion Tylee, who was also an artist, included a biography of her aunt in her papers, deposited at the National Library of New Zealand.

Avery died in Hastings on 29 September 1957, having been predeceased by her husband in 1917, and her ashes were buried in Havelock North Cemetery.
