= Alice Mofflin =

Australian philanthropist (1878–1961)

Alice Maude Mofflin MBE
- Born: 26 May 1878; Blackwood, Victoria, Australia
- Died: 23 March 1961 (aged 82); Mount Lawley, Perth, Western Australia, Australia
- Occupations: Methodist lay leader, charity worker

Alice Maude Mofflin MBE (26 May 1878 – 23 March 1961) was an Australian Methodist lay leader and charity worker. She helped establish the Methodist Children's Home in Victoria, Australia, and oversaw its management as the head of the Women's Auxiliary committee for thirty eight years. She served many other charitable causes through the Methodist church, including serving for thirty years as president of the Victoria chapter of the Methodist Women's Auxiliary to Overseas Missions. For the Queen's birthday honours in 1958, she was appointed a Member of the British Empire. She died on March 23, 1961, at her home in Mount Lawley, Western Australia.

== Biography ==
Mofflin was born Alice Maude Burridge on 26 May 1878, in Blackwood, Victoria. Her father, Rev. William Burridge, an English born immigrant to Australia, was a Wesleyan minister. Her mother was Margaret Alice Burridge, née Neale, and also an English-born immigrant to Australia. Alice was their second-born child. After graduating from the Methodist Ladies' College in Kew, a suburb of Melbourne, she moved west to Western Australia to assist her father in his work. He served churches in Fremantle and Claremont. She married Horace Elgar Mofflin, a merchant and former mayor of Claremont, on 15 August 1906. In addition to raising his four children from his first marriage, Alice Mofflin had eight children with her husband.

Beginning in 1910, Mofflin began charitable work to assist orphaned children through the Methodist church. She housed children in her own home, and raised funds for a Methodist Children's Home. In 1921, Mofflin became president of the Methodist women's auxiliary that would manage the home, which was opened on 14 October 1922 in Victoria Park. As president, Mifflin was responsible for general oversight of the facility, as well as fundraising for its operating expenses. She also assisted on occasion as the matron in charge of the children. In addition to her work at the Home for Children, Mofflin was a leader in the Sunday School movement and in Methodist church camp activities. She served as a camp mother for Easter programs at Glen Forrest camp for twenty years.

Mofflin also had an interest in mission work, and served for thirty years as president of the Victoria chapter of the Methodist Women's Foreign Missions Auxiliary. The name was later changed to Women's Auxiliary for Overseas Missions in the 1930s. Mofflin helped raise funds for Methodist mission projects overseas; she was a key supporter of the Methodist church located in Rabaul, Papua-New Guinea, after the end of the Second World War. Her husband was also active in mission work with the Western Australia Methodist Conference, serving as a lay treasurer. An avid horticulturalist, Horace Mofflin developed an extensive rose garden at their home in Darlinghurst, and the couple began a tradition of hosting a fête each year in the garden to raise funds to support a medical sister at an overseas mission. By 1938, they had hosted eleven annual rose fundraisers, held even during the war years.

In 1954, she was given the honorary title of "President for Life" in recognition of her many years of service to the Home for Children in Victoria Park. In 1958, at the Queen's Birthday Honours, she was appointed a member of the British Empire, in recognition of her charitable work for children. In 1959, she stepped down as president of the women's auxiliary after 39 years of service. The home was renamed the Mofflyn Home for Children in 1959, to honor both Mofflin and R. J. Lynn, who had donated funds for the founding of the home.

Mofflin died on 23 March 1961 at home in Mount Lawley. Her husband had died in 1939, and two sons also pre-deceased her. She had six surviving daughters at the time of her death.
