= Aliki Kayaloglou =

Singer

Aliki Kayaloglou or Alice Kayaloglou (in Greek Αλίκη Καγιαλόγλου) is a Greek singer and performer and has had a long international career.

She has collaborated with two of the most important Greek composers, Mikis Theodorakis and Manos Hadjidakis. Appeared starting 1982 in recitals in Greece and abroad. Interpreted songs by Greek poets Giorgos Seferis, Odysseas Elytis, Constantine P. Cavafy, Yiannis Ritsos, Manolis Anagnostakis, Nikos Gatsos etc. She has also sung songs from Spanish poet Federico García Lorca and from Argentinians Astor Piazzolla Horacio Ferrer and others.

== Selective discography ==
(Original Greek titles followed by English translations in parentheses)

- Τραγούδια από την Ισπανία και την Λατινική Αμερική (Songs from Spain and Latin America)
- Η Αλίκη Καγιαλόγλου διαβάζει και τραγουδά Παπαδιαμάντη (Aliki Kayaloglou reads and sings Papadiamanti)
- Η Αλίκη Καγιαλόγλου τραγουδά Μάνο Χατζιδάκι (Aliki Kayaloglou sings Manos Hadjidakis)
- Τα νησιά του ουρανού (The skies of the Islands)
- Αέρας φυσάει τα τραγούδια
- Αντικατοπτρισμοί (Reflections)
- Επιλογή
- Στο Σείριο γράφουνε παιδιά

Interpreta canciones con textos de y no “canta canciones de”.
