= Alice Delahunty =

Irish electrical engineer

- Born: 1981 (age 44–45)
- Education: University College Dublin
- Known for: Electricity transmission, low-carbon technologies
- Awards: Fellow of the Royal Academy of Engineering (2021)
- Scientific career
- Fields: Electrical engineering
- Workplaces: National Grid

Alice Delahunty (born 1981) is an Irish chartered electrical engineer who is President of Electricity Transmission at National Grid.

== Early life and education ==
Delahunty holds a BEng in Electrical and Electronics Engineering and a Master's in Management Science from University College Dublin. In 2007, while working as an electrical engineer at E.ON, she won the Institution of Engineering and Technology’s (IET) Young Woman Engineer of the Year award.

== Career ==
She held a variety of roles at E.ON, transitioning from an electrical test engineer into research and development, focusing on low-carbon technologies. She eventually became the Head of Offshore UK Wind Operations.

Delahunty joined National Grid in April 2018 as Head of Network Optimisation. In 2020, she became the first President of the Electricity Transmission business. She is responsible for overseeing the electricity transmission network in England and Wales, including overseeing Phase 2 of the London Power Tunnels initiative, and is involved in advancing the UK government’s net-zero commitments.

Delahunty was elected a Fellow of the Royal Academy of Engineering in 2021. She has also served as a member of the Board of Trustees of the Institution of Engineering and Technology.

== Awards and honours ==
- 2007 – Institution of Engineering and Technology (IET) Young Woman Engineer of the Year
- 2021 – Fellow of the Royal Academy of Engineering
