= Alice Brusewitz =

New Zealand photographer

- Born: 29 July 1858; Nelson
- Died: 20 November 1927 (aged 69); Wellington

Alice Brusewitz (née Palmer 1858-1927) was a New Zealand commercial photographer.

Born in Nelson, in around 1887 Brusewitz married photographer Henry Elis Leopold Brusewitz, who had been born in Sweden and migrated to New Zealand. The couple lived in Nelson and ran a photographic business there from about 1893. They also both exhibited photographs, for example for the opening of the Suter Art Gallery in 1899.

She joined the Nelson Camera Club in the mid 1890s and regularly showed in their exhibitions from 1899.

In 1911 Brusewitz moved to Perth, while her husband remained in Nelson where he died 1922. She returned to Nelson in 1919.
