= Alice Pignagnoli =

Italian footballer (born 1988)

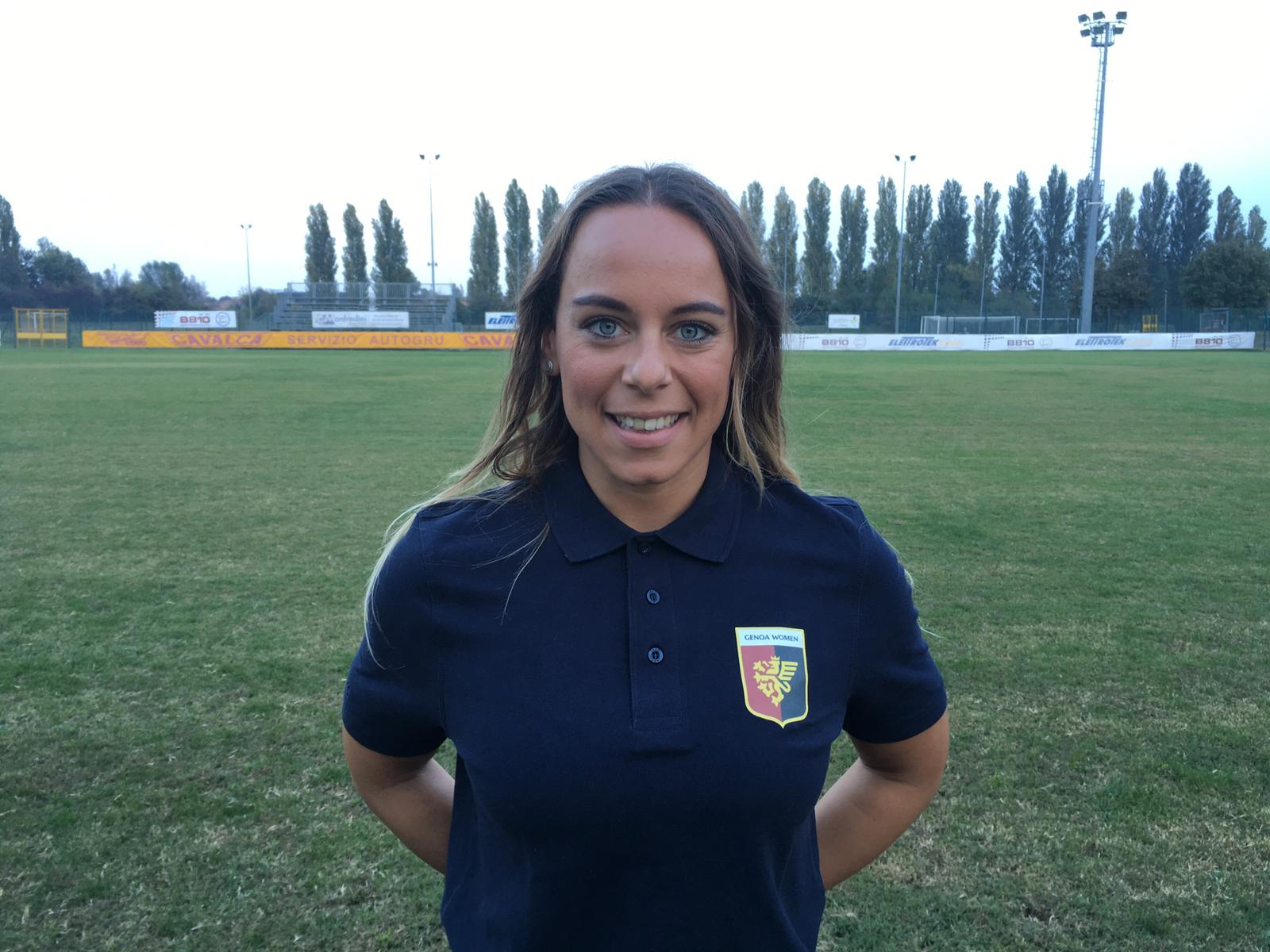
- Pignagnoli in 2018

Personal information
- Date of birth: 14 March 1988 (age 38)
- Place of birth: Reggio Emilia, Italy
- Height: 1.70 m (5 ft 7 in)
- Position: Goalkeeper

Team information
- Current team: Padova

Senior career*
Years	Team	Apps	(Gls)
2006–2007	Galileo Giovolley	21	(0)
2007–2008	Tradate Abbiate	1	(0)
2008–2009	ACF Milan	12	(0)
2009–2010	Como 2000	20	(0)
2010–2011	Napoli	21	(0)
2011–2012	Torres	7	(0)
2012–2013	Riviera di Romagna	16	(0)
2013–2014	Atletico Oristano	26	(0)
2014–2015	Valpolicella	21	(0)
2015–2016	Riviera di Romagna	9	(0)
2016–2017	Imolese	14	(0)
2017–2018	Mantova	29	(0)
2018–2019	Genova Women	20	(0)
2019–2022	Cesena	34	(0)
2022–2023	Lucchese		
2024	Ravenna		
2024	Pro Palazzolo		
2025–	Padova		
- * Club domestic league appearances and goals

Alice Pignagnoli (born 14 March 1988) is an Italian professional footballer and manager who plays as a goalkeeper for Padova Woman.

== Club career ==
Born in Reggio Emilia, Pignagnoli approached football from an early age, first as an outfield player and, only around the age of 15, due to an injury to the starting goalkeeper of the Primavera team, she wore the number 1 shirt.

After her first experiences in mixed teams, Pignagnoli grew up as a footballer in the youth sector of Reggiana, with whose first team (which would then finish fourth in the Serie A championship, gaining access to the UEFA Women's Cup) she would be aggregated for the first time in the 2004-2005 season, collecting two benches in the top division.

The following year she was included in the first team squad as a permanent third goalkeeper and played in the National Primavera championship as the starting goalkeeper.

In the 2006-2007 season, Pignagnoli was loaned to Galileo Giovolley in Serie B, a team with which she played 21 matches out of 22 as a starter, finishing in third place, just a hair's breadth from promotion to Serie A2. From this moment on, Alice went on several loans around Italy, until her debut in Serie A with Milan and her arrival at Torres, a team with which she also played in the Champions League and won an Italian Supercup (in 2011) and a Scudetto in 2012.

In July 2019, after a year at Genoa Women and the consequent relegation to Serie B, Pignagnoli moved to Cesena, in the same category. However, at the beginning of December she suspended her football career, as she was pregnant. In agreement with the club, her employment contract was terminated (as indicated by the federation at the time), but with the guarantee of being able to benefit from a reimbursement for expenses. In the summer of 2020, while she was in the seventh month of pregnancy, Cesena renewed her contract, the first known case in Italian women's football. On 19 November of the same year, just 100 days after giving birth to her daughter Eva, she returned to the field in the Coppa Italia match against Milan, losing 2-0. From that day onwards, she was always available, making 17 appearances as a starter in the rest of the championship.

In the summer of 2022, after being released for a short period, Pignagnoli reached an agreement with Lucchese, a Serie C club. The following October, she suspended her career again, after discovering her second pregnancy. However, despite the support of the coach and her teammates, the club refused to pay the player the remaining monthly wages, going as far as to exclude her from the squad: after a few weeks, Pignagnoli decided to publicly denounce the incident. Lucchese, although finally agreeing to pay the goalkeeper's outstanding wages, denied her version of events. In the meantime, among others, the MP Laura Boldrini intervenes in the case, presenting together with other colleagues an official parliamentary question to the Meloni government, and the management of Ternana, who offers to hire the player and cover her expenses. In the meantime, Pignagnoli confirms her desire to leave the club in the following summer, taking advantage of a federal solidarity fund for maternity from February 2023 until the end of the season.

On 30 December of the same year, Pignagnoli was officially signed by Ravenna, in Serie B.

On 22 September 2024, the newly formed club Pro Palazzolo Women officially presented Pignagnoli, participating in the Eccellenza Lombardia championship.

== Managerial career ==
In June 2023, Pignagnoli was hired as the new team manager of Beach Soccer Terracina, a team in the top division of the Italian beach soccer championship.

== Personal life ==
In 2010, Pignagnoli graduated in Communication Sciences at IULM in Milan, with a thesis on the representation of women in the media, obtaining a grade of 110/110.

She is the mother of two children, born in 2020 and 2023 respectively.

In February 2023, Pignagnoli published her autobiography, entitled I Just Wanted to Be a Footballer, where she recounts her journey of struggle and emancipation both in life and in her football career. The volume features a preface by Laura Giuliani.

== Honours ==
Torres

- Serie A: 2011–12
- Supercoppa Italiana: 2012
