= Alice Morgan Person =

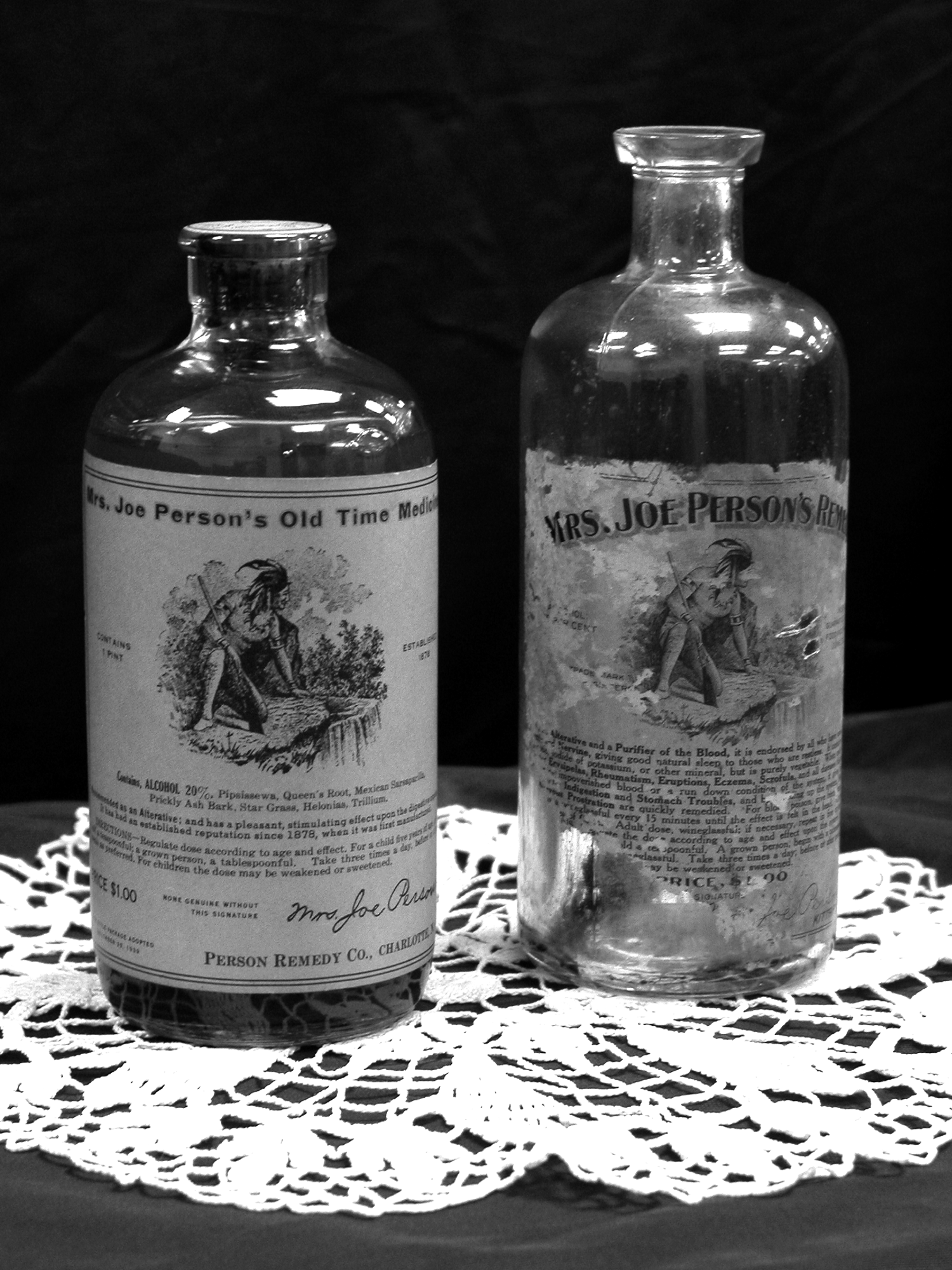
Two Mrs. Joe Person's Remedy bottles. The empty one on the right (from the private collection of Thilbert Pearce) dates to before 1906. The unopened one on the left (from the private collection of Wyatt and Libby McGhee III) was produced after 1939.

Alice Morgan Person (July 28, 1840 – June 12, 1913), known professionally as Mrs. Joe Person, was an American medicine entrepreneur and musician. She manufactured and marketed a patent medicine called Mrs. Joe Person’s Remedy, which was of Native American origin, from 1878 until her death. Her third son, Rufus, continued to manufacture and distribute the medicine until 1943.

Alice supplemented her patent medicine activities by using her musical skills to demonstrate pianos for keyboard instrument vendors at county fairs and state expositions throughout the South. As a result, visitors to the exhibits at which Alice played requested she publish her folk-tune arrangements, which she did in 1889.

== Biography ==
The second of five children, Alice was born and raised in Petersburg, Virginia. Though financial woes plagued her parents, they still managed to provide Alice and her siblings with a high-quality education. In 1857, Alice married Joseph Arrington Person, and by doing so became part of a prominent North Carolina family. The couple settled on Joseph’s estate in Franklinton, North Carolina, just north of Raleigh, where they raised their nine children.

A neighbor introduced Alice to the medicine that would make her famous when her third daughter, Josephine, became seriously ill. Alice credited the Native American elixir with saving her daughter, and continued to make and share it until she realized it could provide desperately-needed income. Her husband’s stroke and the Civil War left the family with no way to make a living from their farm. Alice christened the medicine Mrs. Joe Person’s Remedy and set out across the state of North Carolina selling it door-to-door and in drug stores, later supplementing this income with piano playing engagements and the sale of her published folk-tune arrangements.

Alice traveled widely, including multiple trips to the western United States. She died in Santa Fe, New Mexico, during her third western excursion.

== Medicine ==
The medicine was a bitters (i.e., a mixture of herbs and alcohol) that preserved and suspended the processed stems, leaves, or roots of seven native plants in a 20 percent alcohol base. The medicine was especially effective for scrofula, a form of tuberculosis which inflames the glands of the neck causing painful sores. Alice also developed an herbal wash to assist with healing these sores.

== Music ==
Much of Alice’s performing repertoire had its roots in the music of blackface minstrelsy. She published two collections of her piano arrangements of songs that harkened back to pre-Civil War days. The first contained fifteen pieces and was titled A Collection of Popular Airs as Arranged and Played Only by Mrs. Joe Person at the Southern Expositions. The second contained only three pieces and was titled A Transcription of the Beautiful Song Blue Alsatian Mountains! Also “Down-Town Girls” and “Boatman Dance” as Arranged and Played by Mrs. Joe Person.
