= Agkairia =

Agkairia Αγκαιριά
- Community
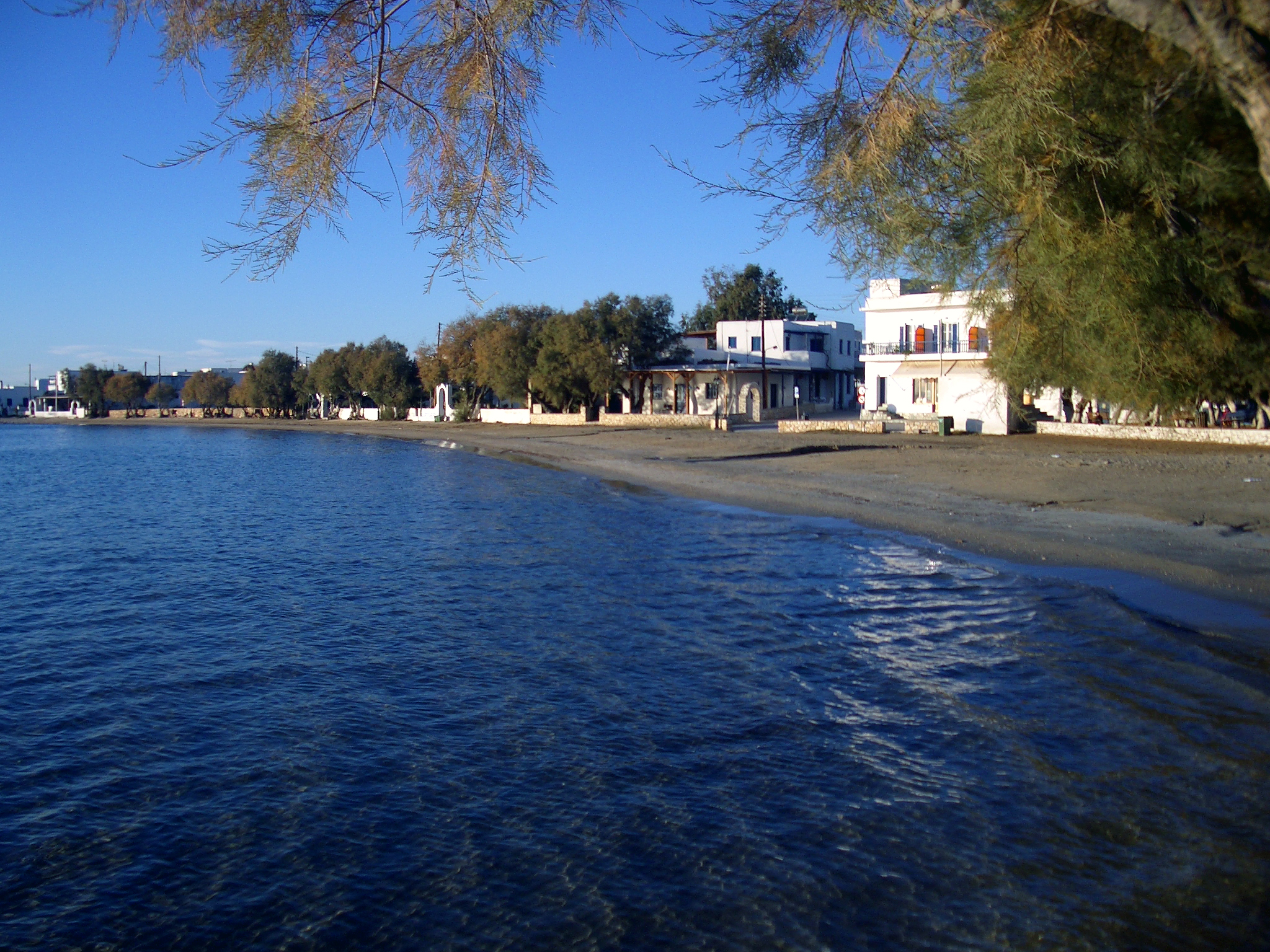
- Aliki Beach

- Location within Greece
- Coordinates: 37°0′N 25°9′E
- Country: Greece
- Administrative region: South Aegean
- Regional unit: Paros
- Municipality: Paros

Population (2021)
  - Community: 1,302
- Time zone: UTC+2 (EET)
  - Summer (DST): UTC+3 (EEST)

Agkairia (Greek: Αγκαιριά) is a village and a community in the Cyclades. It is located in the southwestern corner of the island of Paros. At the 2021 census, the population of the village was 343, and of the community 1,302. The community consists of several villages and uninhabited islets. The main villages are Alyki (Greek: Αλυκή, pop. 708), Agkairia, Kamari (pop. 88) and Voutakos (pop. 81).

== Overview ==
Alyki is one of the larger villages on the island of Paros. Located on a small bay at the southwest corner of the island Alyki is home to several active fishermen. Some semi-retired fishermen and taverna owners catch octopus through the winter to supply the increased activity during the tourist season, primarily June through September.

For the village festival, 6 August, a large dance stage is set up on the central beach. Local musicians provide live music and all ages participate in the traditional and modern dancing. Other locals provide free food and drink, usually grilled small fish and local wine.

Alyki has a beach and an airport. The beach of Alyki is wide and sandy, with tamarisk trees. Due to the site, the beach is well protected from the winds. It is accessible by bus or by car.
