= Alice Withrow =

American botanist (1907–1998)

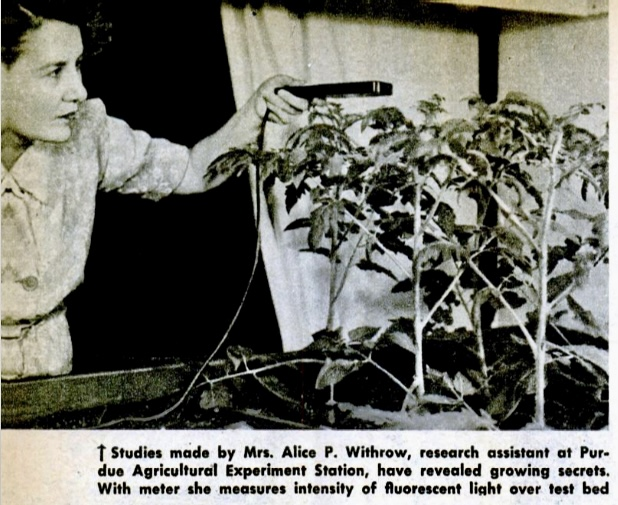
- Popular Mechanics, Oct. 1946
- Born: Alice Victoria Phillips; September 5, 1907; Louisville, Kentucky
- Died: April 28, 1998; Montgomery County, Maryland
- Occupation: Botanist

Alice Victoria Phillips Withrow (September 5, 1907 – April 28, 1998) was an American botanist, plant physiologist and researcher of plant photochemistry. Her focus of study was "the effect of light on the flowering and reproduction of plants" and along with her husband she developed a pioneering method of hydroponics.

== Biography ==
Withrow was born on September 5, 1907 in Louisville, Kentucky to Roscoe M. and Ollie (Snawder) Phillips. She attended Butler University (B.A. degree, botany, 1929) and University of Cincinnati (M.A. degree, 1931), where her master's thesis "Life forms and leaf size classes of certain plant communities of the Cincinnati region" was overseen by Emma Lucy Braun and published 1932 in the journal Ecology. In 1931, she married Robert Bruce Withrow. Their honeymoon trip was the journey to Purdue University where they both had new jobs and she later completed her Ph.D.

During World War II Withrow and her husband were consulting scientists for the U.S. Air Force on the problem of growing plants without soil, in part so that the military could "grow perishable vegetables on sandy bases in the Pacific." In May 1945 Withrow was preparing hydroponics kits for shipment to Canton Island, Espiritu and Ascension Island, with later installations planned for Port Moresby and Karachi. A 2006 timeline of the history of hydroponic growing credited Withrow and her husband with introducing "inert gravel" as a growing medium, and noted that in 1945 the Air Force constructed a hydroponic farm on Wake Island that produced tomatoes, string beans, sweet corn and lettuce. In late 1945 she lectured in Chicago on "soil-less culture and the effect of various spectrum colors on the growth rate of plants." After the war, the Withrows published a paper comparing the use of mercury, incandescent and the new fluorescent lamps for growing plants. The Withrows' research was featured in the science magazine Popular Mechanics in October 1946.

In 1948 the Withrows relocated to the Smithsonian. In 1956 they co-authored a book chapter on "Generation, control, and measurement of visible and near-visible radiant energy" that was considered an "excellent and thorough review of the problems concerned with lighting."

Withrow wrote the preface to a posthumously published book edited by her husband, Photoperiodism and related phenomena in plants and animals. In the 1960s and 1970s, Withrow led the educational materials and instruction development division of the U.S. National Science Foundation.

Withrow had one child, Anne V. Withrow-Dalager (1934–1996). Withrow died on April 29, 1998, in Montgomery County, Maryland.

== Selected works ==
- Withrow, Alice (April 1, 1945). "Interrelationship of nitrogen and photo-period on the flowering, growth, and stem anatomy of certain long day and short day plants". Butler University Botanical Studies (PDF). 7 (1).
- Withrow, Alice P.; Withrow, Robert B. (October 1, 1947). "Plant Growth with Artificial Sources of Radiant Energy". Plant Physiology. 22 (4): 494–513. doi:10.1104/pp.22.4.494. ISSN 0032-0889. PMC 405889. PMID 16654118.
- Withrow, Alice P.; Withrow, R.B. (1943). "Translocation of the Floral Stimulus in Xanthium". Botanical Gazette. 104 (3): 409–416. doi:10.1086/335150. JSTOR 2471979. S2CID 84018891.
- Withrow, Alice P.; Withrow, Robert B. (October 1949). "Photoperiodic Chlorosis in Tomato". Plant Physiology. 24 (4): 657–663. doi:10.1104/pp.24.4.657. ISSN 0032-0889. JSTOR 4258250. PMC 437415. PMID 16654255.
- Withrow, R.B.; Withrow, Alice P. (1948). Extension Circular: Nutriculture (Report). Indiana: Purdue University Agricultural Experiment Station – via Purdue University Libraries and School of Information Studies E-Archives.
- Withrow, R.B.; Withrow, A.P. (1956). "Generation, control, and measurement of visible and near-visible radiant energy". In Hollaender, A. (ed.). Radiation Biology. Vol. III: Visible and Near-Visible Light. New York: McGraw Hill. pp. 125–258. doi:10.5962/bhl.title.6279. LCCN 53006042. OCLC 594754626. OL 6133378M – via Biodiversity Heritage Library.
