= Alicia (given name) =

- Pronunciation: /əˈlɪʃ(i)ə, -liː-, -siə/ Spanish: [aˈliθja]
- Gender: Female
- Language: Spanish

Origin
- Meaning: Nobility

Other names
- Variant forms: Alecia (Alisia), Alycia, Alisha, Alesha
- See also: Alice, Alyssa, Alix, Alison, Allison, Adelaide, Adelaida, Adele, Adela, Adelia, Adelina, Zélie

Alicia is a feminine given name. It is a variant of Alice, which comes from the Germanic name Adalheidis (Adelaide), meaning "noble natured" (noble of kind).

== People with the given name ==
- Alicia Abella, American engineer
- Alicia Aberley (born 1984), Australian swimmer
- Alicia Agneson (born 1996), Swedish actress
- Alicia Agut (1929–2017), Spanish actress
- Alicia Albe (born 1977), American rhythmic gymnast
- Alicia Alfonso (born 1963), Uruguayan actress
- Alicia Alonso (1920–2019) Cuban dancer
- Alicia Alonzo (born 1946), Filipino actress
- Alicia Amatriain (born 1980), Spanish ballet dancer
- Alicia Amherst (1865–1941), English horticulturist, botanist, and author of the first scholarly account of English gardening history
- Alicia Andrews (born 1966 or 1967), American politician
- Alicia Appleman-Jurman (1930–2017), Polish memoirist of the Holocaust
- Alicia Arango (born 1958), Colombian politician and businesswoman
- Alicia Armendariz, known as Alice Bag (born 1958), American punk rock singer and author
- Alicia Ashley (born 1967), Jamaican boxer
- Alicia Atout (born 1995), Canadian interviewer and YouTube personality
- Alicia Austin (born 1942), American fantasy and science fiction artist and illustrator
- Alicia Austria-Martinez (born 1940), Filipina judge
- Alicia Banit (born 1990), Australian actress and dancer
- Alicia Brännback (born 2000), Swedish taekwondo athlete
- Alicia Bárcena (born 1952), Mexican United-Nations official
- Alicia Barker (born 1998), professional footballer who plays as a defender
- Alicia Barnett (born 1993), British professional tennis player
- Alicia Barney (born 1952), Colombian artist
- Alicia Barrancos (born 1972), Argentine freestyle swimmer
- Alicia Barrié (1915–2002), Chilean actress
- Alicia Bellán (1931–2018), Argentine film actress
- Alicia Berneche (born 1971), American lyric coloratura soprano
- Alicia Bertone, American academic, administrator, researcher, and veterinary surgeon
- Alicia Bezuidenhout (born 1967), South African former cricketer
- Alicia Blagg (born 1996), British former diver
- Alicia Blomberg (born 1989), Canadian ball hockey player
- Alicia Bobadilla (born 1994), Paraguayan professional footballer
- Alicia Boole Stott (1860–1940), British mathematician
- Alicia Borinsky, US-based Argentine novelist, poet and literary critic
- Alicia Borrachero (born 1968), Spanish actress
- Alicia Boscatto (born 1960), Argentine breaststroke swimmer
- Alicia Boutilier (born 1968), Chief Curator and Curator of Canadian Historical Art at the Agnes Etherington Art Centre in Kingston
- Alicia Boyle (1908–1997), Irish abstract marine and landscape artist
- Alicia Bozon (born 1984), French former freestyle swimmer
- Alicia Brandet, American actress
- Alicia Brandt, television and film actress
- Alicia Bridges (born 1953), American pop singer
- Alicia Brown (born 1990), Canadian track and field athlete
- Alicia Bruce, Edinburgh-based photographer, lecturer and freelance educator
- Alicia Bruzzo (1945–2007), Argentine actress
- Alicia Burke, Jamaican fashion model
- Alicia Candiani (born 1953), Argentine artist specializing in printmaking and digital media
- Alicia Cárdeñas (born 1943), Mexican volleyball player
- Alicia L. Carriquiry, Uruguayan statistician
- Alicia Caro (born 1930), Colombian retired film actress
- Alicia Castro (born 1949), Argentine diplomat
- Alicia Castro (volleyball) (born 1994), Mexican female volleyball player
- Alicia Beatriz Casullo (1940–2019), Argentine psychoanalyst
- Alicia Cazzaniga (1928–1968), Argentine modernist architect
- Alicia Cebrián (born 1983), Spanish Real Club Náutico de Tenerife sailor
- Alicia Cervantes (born 1994), Mexican football forward
- Alicia Cervera (born 1930), Peruvian-American businesswoman, real estate broker and philanthropist
- Alicia R. Chacón (1938–2025), American politician and judge
- Alicia Chong Rodriguez, engineer and inventor
- Alison Cockburn (1712–1794), Scottish poet, wit and socialite
- Alicia Collins, American politician
- Alicia Coppola (born 1968), American actress
- Alícia Correia (born 2003), Portuguese professional footballer
- Alicia Coutts (born 1987), Australian medley, butterfly and freestyle swimmer
- Alicia Craig (born 1982), American distance runner
- Alicia Creus (born 1939), Argentine artist
- Alicia Crossley, Australian recorder player
- Alicia Cuarón (born 1939), Mexican-American educator and human rights activist
- Alicia D'Amico (1933–2001), Argentine photographer
- Alicia D'Anvers, English poet known for her satires of academic life
- Alicia Dana (born 1969), American Paralympian
- Alicia Daneri (born 1942), Argentine Egyptologist
- Alicia Boler Davis, American engineer and businesswoman
- Alicia Delibes (born 1950), Spanish politician and teacher
- Alicia DeShasier (born 1984), American track and field athlete
- Alicia Drake (born 1968), British fashion journalist
- Alicia Fabbri (born 2003), Canadian ice dancer
- Alicia Craig Faxon, American art historian, author, curator and educator
- Alicia Ferguson (born 1981), Australian football (soccer) player
- Alicia Flórez (born 2004), Spanish basketball player
- Alicia Foster, better known as Jodie Foster, American actress
- Alicia Fox (born 1986), American model and professional wrestler
- Alicia Fulford-Wierzbicki, New Zealand actress
- Alicia García-Salcedo González (1903–2003), Asturian lawyer
- Alicia Garza (born 1981), American civil rights activist
- Alicia Gaspar de Alba (born 1958), Mexican-American academic and poet
- Alicia Gironella D'Angeli (born 1931), Mexican chef
- Alicia Goranson (born 1974), American actress
- Alicia Gorey (born 1981), Australian news presenter and reporter
- Alicia Graf Mack (born 1979), American dancer
- Alicia Guerrero (born 2003), American para athlete
- Alicia Hall (born 1985), American model
- Alicia Hannah-Kim (fl. 2010s–2020s), Australian actress
- Alicia K. Harris, Canadian director and screenwriter
- Alicia Herrera Rivera (1928–2013), Chilean feminist lawyer
- Alicia Holloway (born 1996), American ballerina
- Alicia Hollowell (born 1984), American softball player
- Alicia Hoskin (born 2000), New Zealand flatwater canoeist
- Alicia Hospedales, Trinidad and Tobago politician
- Alicia Iturrioz (1927–2021), Spanish portraitist and painter
- Alicia Jurado (1922–2011), Argentine writer and academic
- Alicia Kaye (born 1983), Canadian-American professional triathlete
- Alicia Kearns (born 1987), British politician
- Alicia Kersten (born 1988), German football player
- Alicia Keys (born 1981), American R&B singer and pianist
- Alicia Killaly (1836–1908), Canadian watercolour painter
- Alicia Kirchner (born 1946), Argentine politician
- Alicia Koplowitz, Marquise of Bellavista (born 1952), Spanish businesswoman
- Alicia Kozameh (born 1953), Argentine author
- Alicia de Larrocha (1923–2009), Spanish pianist
- Alicia Liu (born c. 1980), Taiwanese model
- Alicia Liu (born 2010), American rhythmic gymnast
- Alicia Lucas (born 1992), former professional Australian rugby union player
- Alicia Luciano (born 1983), title-holder of Miss New Jersey 2002
- Alicia Machado (born 1976), former Miss Universe 1996 from Venezuela
- Alicia Malay, American politician
- Alicia Catherine Mant (1788–1869), English writer of children's stories
- Alicia Markova (1910–2004), British dancer
- Alicia Mastandrea, Argentine politician
- Alicia Mayer (born 1976), Filipina model and actress
- Alicia Menendez (born 1983), American television commentator
- Alicia Minshew (born 1974), American actress
- Alicia Molik (born 1981), Australian tennis Player
- Alicia D. Monroe, American physician and the Provost of the Baylor College of Medicine
- Alicia Monson (born 1998), American long-distance runner
- Alicia Gómez Montano (1955–2020), Spanish journalist
- Alicia Moore (1790–1873), English novelist
- Alicia Moreda (1912–1985), Puerto-Rican soap-opera actress
- Alicia Morton (born 1987), American actress
- Alicia Ostriker (born 1937), American Jewish, feminist poet
- Alicia Parla (1914–1998), Cuban rhumba dancer
- Alicia Parlette (1982–2010), American journalist and cancer survivor
- Alicia Partnoy (born 1955), Argentine human-rights activist
- Alicia Patterson (1906–1963), American newspaper editor
- Alicia Perales Ojeda (1922–1994), Mexican librarian and writer
- Alicia O'Shea Petersen (1862–1923), Tasmanian suffragist and social reformer
- Alicia Reece (born 1971), member of the Ohio House of Representatives
- Alicia Rhett (1916–2014), American actress and portrait painter
- Alicia Rickter (born 1972), American model, actress and Playboy playmate
- Alicia Rio (born 1971), Mexican-American pornographic actress
- Alicia Rodriguez (born 1935), Spanish actress
- Alicia Sacramone (born 1987), American gymnast
- Alicia Sánchez (born 1948), Peruvian volleyball player
- Alicia Sánchez-Camacho (born 1967), Spanish politician
- Alicia Shepard (1953–2023), American journalist
- Alicia Silverstone (born 1976), American actress
- Alicia Smith (cricketer) (born 1984), South Africa cricketer
- Alicia Ann Spottiswoode (1810–1900), Scottish songwriter and composer
- Alicia St. Germaine, American politician from Michigan
- Alicia Boole Stott (1860–1940), Irish mathematician
- Alice Tai (born 1999), British paralympic swimmer
- Alicia Tan (born 2010), Australian rhythmic gymnast
- Alicia Thompson (born 1976), American basketball player
- Alicia Thornton (1780s – 1800s), British horsewoman
- Alicia Tournebize (born 2007), French basketball player
- Alicia Vela-Bailey (born 1982), American stunt performer, stunt double, actress, dancer, and choreographer
- Alicia Vergel (1927–1993), Filipina actress
- Alicia Vikander (born 1987), Swedish actress and dancer
- Alicia Villarreal (born 1974), Mexican singer
- Alicia Vitarelli (born 1978), American television-news correspondent
- Alicia Warrington (born 1980), American drummer
- Alicia Webb (born 1979), American wrestler
- Alicia Roth Weigel, American intersex activist
- Alicia D. Williams (born 1970), American author and teacher
- Alicia Witt (born 1975), American actress
- Alicia Lynn Yarbrough (died 1993), American murder victim

== Fictional characters ==
- Alicia, the protagonist in Thomas Hardy's short story "Alicia's Diary"
- Alicia, the protagonist in the videogame Valkyrie Profile 2: Silmeria
- Alicia, choir member in the 2003 film School of Rock
- Alicia, daughter of Inés in the 2006 film Goya's Ghosts
- Alicia Abshire, sister of the title character in The Time Traveler's Wife
- Alicia Alarcon, a protagonist in the TV series Gran Hotel
- Alecia Alcott, from the TV series All About Us
- Alicia Baker, supporting character in the television series Smallville
- Allicia Botti, human character in the children's television series Thomas the Tank Engine and Friends
- Alicia Charlotte, a character in the anime Aikatsu Friends!
- Alicia Clark, from the television series Fear the Walking Dead
- Alicia Claus, the protagonist in the videogame Bullet Witch
- Alicia Dessendre, an important character in the video game Clair Obscur: Expedition 33.
- Alicia Dewares, from the film Me Before You
- Alicia Fennel, from the television series Veronica Mars
- Alicia Florence, from the manga Aria
- Alicia Florrick, the protagonist in the television series The Good Wife
- Alicia "Al" Lambert, from the American television sitcom Step by Step
- Alicia Marquez, from the television series Go, Diego, Go!
- Alicia Masters, a supporting character to the Fantastic Four in Marvel Comics
- Alicia McGuire, an American woman searching for her lost son in The Power of Five series
- Alicia Melchiott, the main female protagonist in the video game Valkyria Chronicles
- Alicia Rivera, the beta of Massie in The Clique book series
- Alicia the Snow Queen Fairy, from the book series Rainbow Magic (originally named Alyssa the Snow Queen Fairy)
- Alicia Spinnet, from the Harry Potter series
- Alicia Testarossa, from Magical Girl Lyrical Nanoha
- Alicia Western, the main female protagonist in the novel Stella Maris, also appears in The Passenger
- Alicia Winston, a playable character in the video game Time Crisis 3

== See also ==
- Alisha, Alysha, Alycia, and Leisha, variant spellings or variant forms of the name
- Ana Alicia (born 1956), Mexican actress with this surname
- Alicia (disambiguation)
