= Alicia =

Alicia may refer to:

== People ==
- Alicia (given name), list of people with this name
- Alisha (singer) (born 1968), US pop singer
- Melinda Padovano (born 1987), a professional wrestler, known by her ring name, Alicia

== Places ==
- Alicia, Bohol, Philippines
- Alicia, Isabela, Philippines
- Alicia, Zamboanga Sibugay, Philippines
- Alicia, Arkansas, United States

== Biology ==
- Alicia (cnidarian), a genus of sea anemones in the family Aliciidae
- Alicia (plant), a genus of plants in the family Malpighiaceae

== Others ==
- Alicia (album), a 2020 album by Alicia Keys
- Alicia (Alicia Myers album), a 1981 album
- Alicia (film), a 1974 Dutch film
- Alicia (submarine), 6-seater submarine
- Alicia's Diary, short story by Thomas Hardy
- Hurricane Alicia, devastating hurricane in 1983

== See also ==
- Alisha
- Alycia
