= Women in the automotive industry =

Women began finding work when World War I began in 1914; they had to take the jobs of men who had gone to war. A wide range of jobs needed filling. Automotive machines were in large production around this time to supply the United States and other countries with vehicles for war. This was the start of women playing important roles in the automotive industry.

As at 2016, only 11% of the global workforce in the automotive industry were women, with large national industries such as Japan facing shortages in female engineers.

== Notable women linked to the automotive industry ==
- Bertha Benz- A German automotive pioneer. She was the business partner and wife of automobile inventor Karl Benz. She was known as the first person in history to drive an automobile over a long distance
- Mrs. Alice Huyler Ramsey- founded and became president of the first "Women's Motoring Club" in the United States. On June 9, 1909, this 22-year-old housewife and mother began a 3,800-mile journey from Hell Gate in Manhattan, New York, to San Francisco, California, in a green, four-cylinder, 30-horsepower Maxwell DA.
- Florence Lawrence - Actress and car enthusiast born in 1886. Lawrence came up with an early form, though not the first form, of "turn signals". Using flags on either side of the car, she could remotely lift them to signal that she was turning a certain direction. Lawrence also came up with an early example of a system to alert drivers behind her that she was slowing down, which automatically held a sign out of the driver's side window that read "Stop" whenever the brake was pressed. Although Lawrence never patented this, she is still given credit for playing an important role which has lasted into modern-day automotive design.
- Charlotte Bridgwood - Mother of Florence Lawrence and automotive enthusiast. Bridgwood was responsible for developing an early form, though not the first form, of windshield wiper in 1917.
- Michelle Christensen - Christensen is the first woman to lead of a "supercar" design team, working on Honda/Acura's most expensive car, the NSX. No other women had previously had a lead design on an exotic car.
- Mary Barra - The first female CEO of a major global automaker, at General Motors.
- Alicia Boler Davis- First African-American women to become a GM manufacturing plant manager. Current, Executive VP of Global Manufacturing at General
- Barb Samardzich - COO of Ford Europe.
