= Kersten =

Kersten is a German given name and a Dutch/Low German surname.

== Given name ==
A German male or female given name

- Kersten Artus (born 1964), female German journalist and politician
- Kersten Meier (1954–2001), male German swimmer at the 1972 Summer Olympics
- Kersten Neisser (born 1956), female German rower
- Kersten Reich, German educator and cultural theorist

== Surname ==
A Dutch and Low German patronymic surname, meaning "son of Kerst/Kersten/Kerstijn/Kerstiaen", archaic forms of the name Christian.

People with this surname include:

- Adam Kersten (1930–1983), Polish historian
- Alicia Kersten (born 1988), German football player
- Ben Kersten (born 1981), Dutch-Australian racing cyclist
- Carool Kersten (born 1964), Dutch historian
- Charles J. Kersten (1902–1972), American politician from Wisconsin
- Christoph Kersten (1733–1796), German missionary in Suriname
- Claire Kersten (born 1989), New Zealand netball player
- Dagmar Kersten (born 1970), East German gymnast
- Felix Kersten (1898–1960), Himmler's masseur who aided people persecuted by Nazi Germany
- Frank L. Kersten (1870–1950), American politician
- Franziska Kersten (born 1968) German politician
- Gerrit Hendrik Kersten (1882–1948), Calvinist minister and Dutch politician (SGP)
- Holger Kersten (born 1951), German writer on the lost years of Jesus in India
- Ina Kersten (born 1946), German mathematician
- Joke Kersten (1944–2020), Dutch politician
- Krystyna Kersten (1931–2008), Polish historian
- Mark Kersten (born 1950), Australian politician
- Martin Kersten (1906–1999), German physicist and metallurgist
- Martin L. Kersten (1953–2022), Dutch computer scientist
- Mik Kersten (born 1975), Polish-born Canadian computer scientist
- Otto Kersten (1839–1900), German explorer, chemist and geographer
- Peter Kersten (born 1958), German rower
- Ryan Kersten (born 1986), Australian basketball player
- Sam Kersten (born 1998), Dutch football player
- Trent Kersten (born 1993), American volleyball player and coach

== See also ==
- Kerstens
