= Alesha =

Alesha may refer to:

- "Alesha" (Law & Order: UK), an episode of the British television show Law & Order: UK
- Alesha-class minelayer, ships used by the Soviet Navy in the 1960s
- Alesha Dixon (born 1978), English singer, dancer, actress, and author
- Alesha Oreskovich (born 1972), American model
- Alesha Zappitella (born 1995), American mixed martial artist

== See also ==
- Aleesha, a female given name
- Alisha and Alysha, female given names
- Alyosha (disambiguation)
- Olesha (disambiguation)
