= Kerst =

Kerst is a German and Dutch surname, a variant of Kirst. Notable people with the surname include:

- Alexander Kerst (1924–2010), Austrian actor
- Donald William Kerst (1911–1993), American physicist

== See also ==
- Kersten
