= Alisha =

- Pronunciation: /əˈliːʃə/ ə-LEE-shə, /əˈlɪʃə/ ə-LISH-ə
- Gender: Female
- Language: Indo-European and Arabic

Origin
- Derivation: Old English
- Meaning: Noble/nobility; protected by God

Other names
- Variant forms: Alesha, Aleesha, Alysha, Allysha
- Related names: Alicia, Alycia, Alice

Alisha (Arabic: ,علیشا أليشا Alīshā) also refer as protected from God is a cognate of the Spanish-language feminine given name Alicia, a variant of the French/German-language name Alice, which comes from Old English Æthelhādas or Æðelhādas, meaning noble or nobility.

Both meanings do not share the same origin. The protected by God derives from Old Arabic which may have been incorporated into Spanish during Muslim rule.

Variant forms of this name include Alesha, Alysha, and Allysha.

== Notable people with this name ==
- Alisha (singer), American singer
- Alisha Boe (born 1997), Norwegian actress
- Alysha Boekhoudt (born 1993), Aruban model
- Alysha Brilla (born 1988), Canadian musician
- Alysha Burnett (born 1997), Australian athlete
- Alisha Butchers (born 1997), Welsh rugby player
- Allysha Chapman (born 1989), Canadian soccer player
- Alisha Chinai (born 1965), Indian pop singer
- Alysha Clark (born 1987), African-American professional basketball player
- Alesha Dixon, English singer
- Alisha Edwards (born 1987), American professional wrestler
- Alisha Evanson (born 2002), British gymnast
- Allisha Gray (born 1995), American basketball player
- Alisha Kramer (born 1990), American physician and health activist
- Alisha Lehmann (born 1999), Swiss footballer
- Alysha Newman (born 1994), Canadian Olympic athlete
- Alisha Palmowski (born 2006), British racing driver
- Alisha Weir (born 2009), Irish actress
- Alisha Choudhary, Indian Karateka

== See also ==
- Alicia (given name)
- Elisha (given name)
- Alisha (Alisha Chinai album), 2001
- Alisha's Attic, band
