= Alycia =

- Pronunciation: ə-LIS-yə, ə-LIS-ə, ə-LISH-ə
- Gender: Female

Origin
- Meaning: noble/nobility

Other names
- See also: Alicia, Alisha, Alice

Alycia is a feminine given name. The name is variant of Alicia, a form of Alice, and is ultimately from the Germanic name Adalheidis (Adelaide), meaning "noble-kind".

== People ==
- Alycia Debnam-Carey, Australian actress
- Alycia Delmore, American actress
- Alycia Dias, Pakistani playback singer
- Alycia Halladay, Chief Science Officer at the Autism Science Foundation
- Alycia Lane, American television journalist
- Alycia Moulton, retired American professional tennis player
- Alycia Parks, American tennis player

== Fictional characters ==
- Alycia, character in the British film The Voice of Merrill

== See also ==
- Alicia, Alisha and Leisha, variant forms of the name
- Alicia (disambiguation), other meanings
