= Parlette =

Surname list

Parlette is a surname. Notable people with the surname include:

- Alicia Parlette (1982–2010), American journalist
- Linda Evans Parlette (born 1945), American politician
