= Changed Man =

Changed Man may refer to:

- A Changed Man and Other Tales, a 1913 short story collection by Thomas Hardy, and its title story
- The Changed Man, a 1998 Iranian romantic comedy film
- The Changed Man, the first volume of Orson Scott Card's 1990 short story collection Maps in a Mirror
- "Changed Man", a 2009 single by Chris Brown

== See also ==
- "Finally Got Myself Together (I'm a Changed Man)", a 1974 song by the Impressions
- Strange Man, Changed Man, a 1979 album by Bram Tchaikovsky
