= Stacey Toran =

American football player (1961–1989)

No. 30
- Position: Safety

Personal information
- Born: October 11, 1961; Indianapolis, Indiana, U.S.
- Died: August 5, 1989 (aged 27); Marina Del Rey, California, U.S.
- Listed height: 6 ft 2 in (1.88 m)
- Listed weight: 200 lb (91 kg)

Career information
- High school: Broad Ripple (Indianapolis)
- College: Notre Dame
- NFL draft: 1984: 6th round, 168th overall pick

Career history
- Los Angeles Raiders (1984–1988)

Career NFL statistics
- Interceptions: 6
- Sacks: 9
- Fumble recoveries: 2
- Stats at Pro Football Reference

Stacey Toran (October 11, 1961 – August 5, 1989) was an American professional football defensive back. He played for the Los Angeles Raiders for five seasons. A native of Indianapolis and a graduate of Broad Ripple High School, Toran was a member of the school's 1980 Indiana High School Boys Basketball Tournament championship team. His 57-foot (17 m) shot with one second remaining in the semifinal game against Marion High School put them into the final game. After high school, he played football for the University of Notre Dame before being selected by the Raiders in the 1984 NFL draft. He was killed in an automobile accident, speeding around a turn on Glencoe Avenue, near Alla Park in Marina Del Rey. He was buried in Crown Hill Cemetery and Aboretum, Section 225, Lot 167A, 39.8265831°N 86.1783762°W in Indiana

== See also ==
- List of gridiron football players who died during their careers
