= Broad Ripple High School =

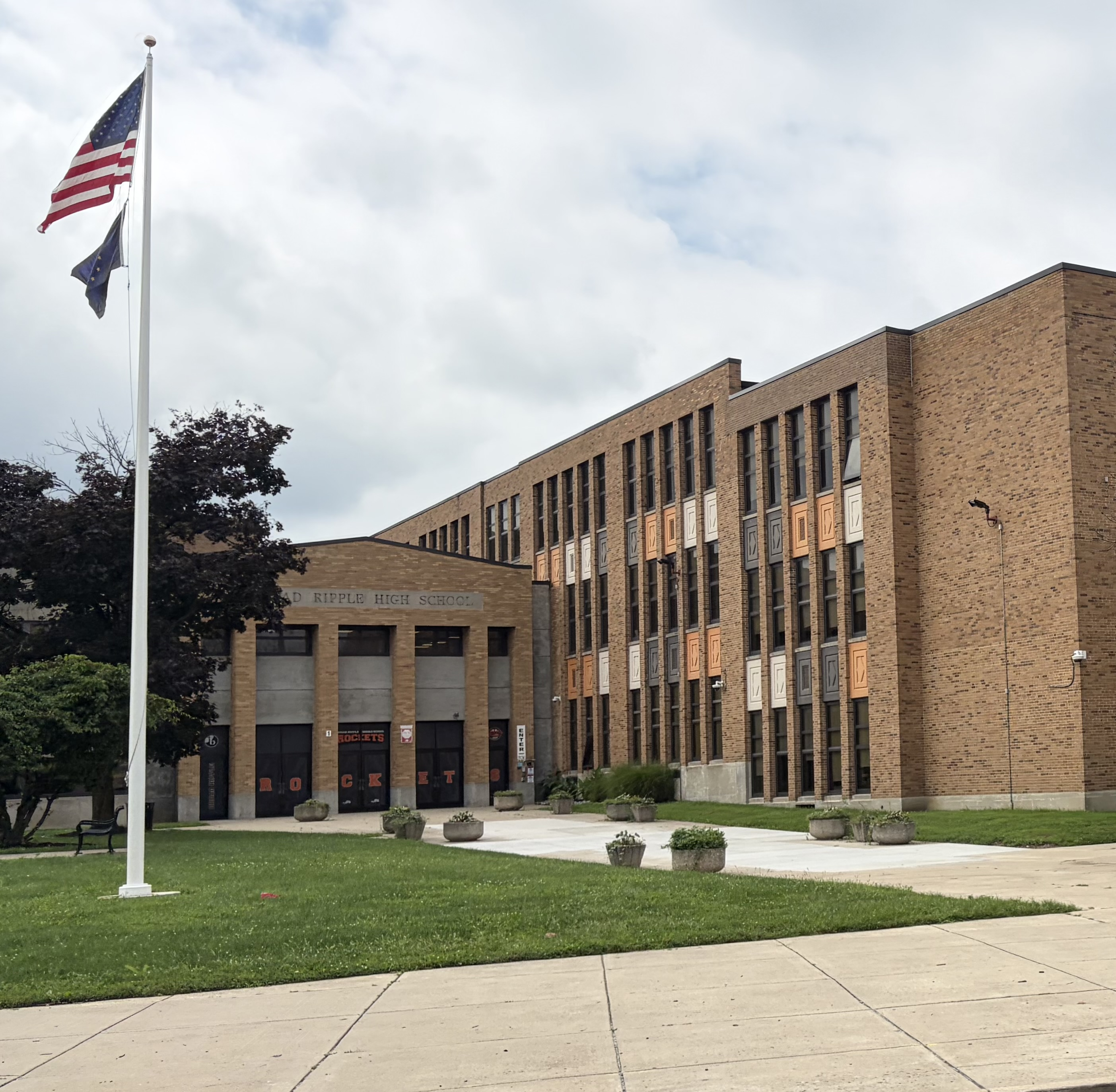
- The former Broad Ripple High School in 2026

Location
- 1115 Broad Ripple Avenue; Indianapolis, Indiana 46220; United States; 39°52′07″N 86°08′15″W

Information
- Type: Public
- Established: 1886
- School district: Indianapolis Public Schools
- Grades: 9–12
- Enrollment: 502 (2014-15)
- Colors: Black and orange
- Athletics conference: Indianapolis Public School Conference
- Team name: Rockets
- Accreditation: North Central Association
- Website: Archived website

Broad Ripple Magnet High School for the Arts & Humanities, established in 1886, is a magnet school of the Indianapolis Public Schools. It was closed as a public high school in 2018, but continued to be used as both an administrative building and a host for a Purdue University charter school. The building is planned to reopen again for the 2024–25 school year as the new public Broad Ripple Middle School.

== History ==
Originally built in 1886 in the town of Broad Ripple, the school started with seven students. The campus was destroyed by fire near the start of the 20th century but was rebuilt. In 1923, the school joined the Indianapolis Public Schools when the town of Broad Ripple was annexed into Indianapolis. Through the 1930s and 1940s, the school continued to grow. In 1961, the school became a haven for high school education in Indianapolis. Once a predominantly white, middle class school, and the last high school in the Indianapolis Public Schools to integrate, Broad Ripple gradually integrated in the 1950s and the first class to graduate African Americans was 1953.

In 1976, the Center for Performing & Visual Arts was created within the school. Two years later, the Center for Humanities became the second magnet program offered at Broad Ripple High School. The Center for Performing & Visual Arts and Center for Humanities at Broad Ripple High School offered students the opportunity for specialized study in the areas of arts and humanities. Both magnet programs provided college preparatory and individualized instruction designed to develop the skills and knowledge necessary to compete and succeed as productive citizens.

== Today ==
Additions, renovations, and annexations took place in 1896, 1913, 1935, 1939, 1949, 1960, 1970, 1988, 1991, and 2003. Enrollment reached its peak at 2,500 in 1995 after the closure of Washington and Howe high schools in Indianapolis. The campus consisted of four buildings attached to each other. The official mascot of the school is the rocket; the school colors are orange and black. The school was accredited by the North Central Association.

Along with the Marching Rockets, Broad Ripple High School also had a dance department where students studied both the fundamentals and advanced forms of dance. Another department within Broad Ripple's Center for Performing Arts was the theatre department. Past performances included Othello, Chicago, and others, held in the Gene Poston Auditorium and the Studio 55 blackbox theatre. The theatre department provided education in acting, directing, stage design and technology, and theatre history. Broad Ripple High School's longest-standing tradition, Ripples Acts, originated from the theatre department.

== Demographics ==
The demographic breakdown of the 538 students enrolled in 2013 was:

- Hispanic – 14.1%
- White – 13.6%
- Multiracial – 4.6%

83.1% of the students were eligible for free or reduced lunch.

== Athletics ==
Sports offered students at Broad Ripple included:

- Baseball (boys)
- Basketball (boys and girls)
  - Boys state champion 1979–80
- Cross Country (boys)
- Football (boys)
- Golf (boys and girls)
- Gymnastics (girls)
- Soccer (boys and girls)
- Softball (girls)
- Swimming (boys and girls)
- Tennis (boys and girls)
  - Boys state champion 1972–73
- Track (boys and girls)
- Volleyball (girls)
- Wrestling (boys)
  - State champion 1957–58 (tied with Richmond)

== Notable alumni ==
- Abraham Benrubi (1987) – Actor
- Rosevelt Colvin (1995) – Former Purdue Boilermakers All-American football player. Former NFL linebacker for the New England Patriots and Chicago Bears
- Michael Graves (1950) – Architect most known for his design and commissioning of the Portland Building and the Denver Public Library
- Wayne Gretzky (~1978) – Considered one of the best NHL players of all time.
- Stephen Goldsmith (1964) – Former Marion County Prosecutor, Indianapolis Mayor and Deputy Mayor of New York City.
- John Hiatt - Singer-songwriter
- George Hill (2004) – NBA player who last played for the Indiana Pacers.
- Stuart Hyatt (1993) – Musician and multimedia artist
- David Letterman (1965) – David Letterman, an iconic figure in late-night television, is best known for his 33-year run as the host of Late Night with David Letterman and The Late Show with David Letterman, where his sharp wit and innovative comedy set a new standard for the genre. Outside of television, Letterman is a co-owner of Rahal Letterman Lanigan Racing, an IndyCar team that competes in the prestigious IndyCar Series.
- John Sheldon Lyman (1949) – Lieutenant Commander, United States Navy, Engineering Officer, USS Thresher (SSN-593)
- Curtis Maxey – NFL player
- Arnold Mickens – Former NFL running back for the Indianapolis Colts
- Alicia D. Monroe – American physician
- Dohn Norwood (1993), actor, Hell on Wheels (TV series)
- Marilyn Quayle, (1967) – Wife of former Vice President of the United States Dan Quayle, mother of Arizona Congressman Ben Quayle.
- Stacey Toran (1980) – Former Notre Dame Fighting Irish football All-American. Former NFL defensive back for the Los Angeles Raiders
- Cory Wade (2001) – Former MLB relief pitcher for the New York Yankees and Los Angeles Dodgers
- Mike Woodson (1976) – Former Indiana University Men's Basketball Head Coach. Previously NBA assistant coach for the New York Knicks. Former coaching positions include time with the Los Angeles Clippers, Atlanta Hawks, Detroit Pistons, Philadelphia 76ers, Cleveland Cavaliers and Milwaukee Bucks. Former NBA player (1980–1990) for the Cleveland Cavaliers, Houston Rockets, Los Angeles Clippers, Sacramento Kings, New Jersey Nets and New York Knicks.

== See also ==
- List of schools in Indianapolis
- List of high schools in Indiana
