= Carolina Castro =

Argentine trade unionist

- Born: 1979 (age 46–47)
- Citizenship: Argentina
- Education: University of Buenos Aires
- Occupations: Businessperson; trade unionist
- Awards: 100 Women (BBC) – 2020

Carolina Castro (born 1979) is an Argentine businessperson and trade unionist. She was the first woman to join the Executive Committee of the Argentine Industrial Union and was named by the BBC as one its 100 Women in 2020.

== Biography ==
Castro has a degree in political science from the University of Buenos Aires. During the government of Mauricio Macri, she served as the undersecretary in the Ministry of Production, for small and medium-sized businesses. During G20 in 2018 she worked on the global business forum strand.

In 2019 she was elected by the Asociación de Fábricas Argentinas de Componentes (Association of Argentine Component Factories, AFAC) to represent the automotive sector on the executive committee of the Argentine Industrial Union (UIA). She is the first woman to get a managerial position in the UIA in its 130-year history. Her activism has helped drive changes towards greater gender equality in the workplace.

Castro is the third generation to work in the family business, Industrias Guidi, which manufactures automotive components and supplies them to Toyota and General Motors. The company has broken stereotypes by employing women in the production area at a higher average than in the rest of the workforce. She recently published Rompimos el Cristal (We Broke the Glass), an anthology of conversations with 18 Argentine women who excel in business, arts, politics and science.

== Awards ==
Castro was named as one of the BBC 100 Women of the Year, in 2020.
