= Olesha (disambiguation) =

Olesha is the surname of Yury Olesha, a Russian writer.

Olesha may also refer to:

- Olesha, Ivano-Frankivsk Oblast, a village in Ukraine
- Olesha, Ternopil Oblast, a village in Ukraine

== See also ==
- Olesh, a moshav in central Israel
- Alesha (disambiguation)
