= Kerstens =

Kerstens is a Dutch patronymic surname, meaning "son of Kersten", archaic form of the name Christian.

People with this surname include:

- Cornelis Corneliszn. Kerstens (1651–1703), mayor of Essen-Kalmthout 1685, alderman at Essen-Kalmthout 1693–1695
- Johann Christian Kerstens (1713–1801), German chemist and physicist
- Jacobus Adrianus Antonius Kerstens (1813–1888), Dutch industrialist, founder in 1857 of cloth factory J.A.A. Kerstens' Lakenfabrieken (Tilburg)
- Andries Kerstens (1818–1870), mayor of Breda 1862–1870
- Piet Kerstens (1896–1958), Dutch teacher and politician (KVP)
- Hendrik Kerstens (born 1956), Dutch photographer
- John Kerstens (born 1965), Dutch politician (PvdA) and trade union leader
- Benny Kerstens (born 1983), Dutch footballer
- Vera Kerstens (born 1987), Dutch pianist
- Tom Kerstens, Dutch classical guitarist

Kerstens is also the surname of the descendants of Kersten Jan Simons (c. 1531 - after 1609) and of three of his sons who had issue: Jan Kersten (c. 1561 - before 1639), Jacob Kersten (before 1570 – 18 July 1645) and Adriaan Kersten (c. 1577 - before 20 December 1611).

Until 1698 the name was alternately spelt with and without a final “s”, but from then on the spelling “Kerstens” prevailed.

Kersten Jan Simons lived in modern-day Zundert, famous for being Vincent van Gogh’s birthplace.

Many descendants still live in the southern Netherlands in the province of North Brabant and in northern Belgium in the province of Antwerp.

== See also ==
- Kersten
