= A Mere Interlude =

1885 short story by Thomas Hardy

- Short story by Thomas Hardy
- Country: United Kingdom
- Language: English
- Genre: Short story

Publication
- Published in: The Bolton Weekly Journal
- Publication type: Periodical literature
- Media type: Print
- Publication date: 1885

"A Mere Interlude" is a short story by Thomas Hardy. It was first published in The Bolton Weekly Journal in October 1885. The story was reprinted in the collection A Changed Man and Other Tales (1913).

== Plot summary ==
Baptista Trewthen is the daughter of a small farmer in St Maria's, one of the Isles of Lyonesse. She works as a schoolmistress in a village near Tor-upon-Sea. During the Easter holidays she accepts a marriage proposal by Mr David Heddegan, a rich man from Giant's Town who is at least 20 years older than herself.

On a Saturday at the end of July, four days before her wedding, she misses the steamboat from Pen-zephyr to St Mary's, and the next boat is only on Tuesday. She meets Charles Stow, her former boyfriend. He persuades her to marry him. The ceremony takes place on Tuesday morning in Trufal. Back in Pen-zephyr Charles takes a plunge in the sea and drowns.

One day later Baptista marries Mr Heddegan as planned, without telling anyone about the brief interlude on the mainland. They spend their wedding night at an inn in Pen-zephyr, accidentally the same place where Charles' corpse is kept.

After less than a month a decayed glazier, who witnessed Baptista's first wedding, starts blackmailing her. When he keeps asking for more and more money she finally decides to tell the truth to her husband. He confesses to be a widower himself and father of four daughters. After this she gradually begins to love her stepdaughters and husband.

== Location ==
Of all Hardy's stories this is the one with the westernmost location. The Isles of Lyonesse are really the Isles of Scilly. St Maria's is the largest island, St Mary's, and Giant's Town its capital Hugh Town. Pen-zephyr is Penzance in Cornwall. Tor-upon-Sea is Torquay.
