= University of Belgrano =

Private university in Buenos Aires, Argentina

Coordinates: 34.5641°S 58.4437°W

- Universidad de Belgrano
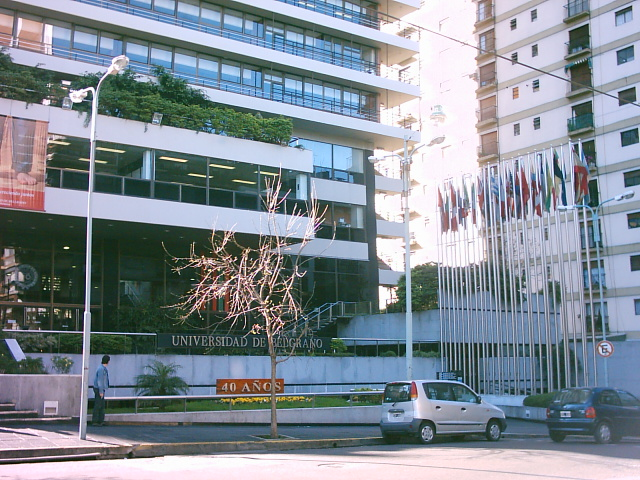
- Motto: Ad omnes pro scientia et cultura (Latin)
- Motto in English: "Science and culture to all"
- Type: Private
- Established: September 11, 1964
- President: Dr. José Luis Ghioldi
- Students: 10,944
- Location: Buenos Aires, Argentina
- Colors: Crimson
- Website: ub.edu.ar
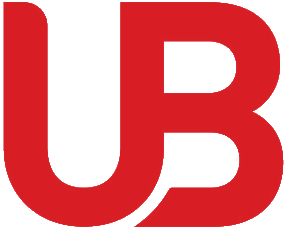

The University of Belgrano (Spanish: Universidad de Belgrano, commonly referred to as UB) is a private university in the Belgrano district of the city of Buenos Aires, Argentina. It was established in 1964.

== Overview ==
The university has nine departments:

- Architecture and Urban Planning
- Law and Political Science
- Economics
- Humanities
- Engineering and Computer Technology
- Agricultural Sciences
- Language and Foreign Studies
- Health Sciences
- Applied Sciences

The school operates 90.9 FM, a station featuring eclectic programming and daily BBC News broadcasts.

The school offers an international program called The Argentine and Latin American Studies Program (PEAL) which is a five-week term consisting of two courses in Spanish at intermediate and advanced level, and four upper-division survey courses in Latin American Studies at the 300 level.

== Ranking ==
According to the QS World University Rankings, UB is the seventh-best private university in the country and is ranked fifth in Buenos Aires.

University rankings

Global – Overall
- QS World: 951-1000 (2026)

== Notable people ==
- Diana Cabeza (1954–2024), designer
- Alicia Beatriz Casullo (1940–2019), psychoanalyst
- Javier Milei (born 1970), president of Argentina
- Soledad Rosas (1974–1998), anarchist
- Martín Rappallini (1968), president of Argentine Industrial Union
