= Argentine Industrial Union =

- Founded: 1887
- Type: Employer federation Advocacy group
- Purpose: Business advocacy
- Location(s): Avenida de Mayo 1157; Buenos Aires
- Region served: Argentina
- Method: Political lobbying
- Key people: Martín Rappallini, President
- Website: Unión Industrial Argentina

The Argentine Industrial Union (Spanish: Unión Industrial Argentina, or, UIA) is the leading industrial employer federation and advocacy group in Argentina. The UIA is a member of the International Organisation of Employers.

== History ==
=== Early development ===
A precursor to the Argentine Industrial Union was founded on August 29, 1875, by a group of Buenos Aires manufacturers. The Argentine Industrial Club was organized to "establish a society at the disposal of local manufacturers in their efforts to secure the adoption of economic reforms." Overshadowed during the 19th century by the dominant wool and hides merchants, local industry was further marginalized by the 1876 advent of transatlantic chilled beef and cereals shipping.

The Industrial Club's early supporters in Congress included such distinguished figures as Miguel Cané, José Hernández, Vicente Fidel López and Carlos Pellegrini, and through their support the Club obtained the passage of a customs reform bill that included protective tariffs on an array of consumer non-durables (such as processed foods and textiles). The Industrial Club organized its first exposition in 1877; but differences among its membership over support for President Nicolás Avellaneda led to the group's 1878 division. An initiative led by Corrientes Province Senator Antonio Cambaceres resulted in the February 7, 1887, establishment of the UIA, whose membership reflected a reunified industrial lobby.

=== From marginalization to influence ===
The UIA, to be sure, represented at best a secondary sector in the Argentine economy at the time. An 1887 industrial census taken by the group revealed 400 industrial establishments, and 11,000 production workers (these figures exclude a considerable amount of cottage industry). The UIA, which initially represented domestic manufacturers, was also overshadowed by the small, but growing, numbers of foreign industrial subsidiaries (mainly British). The group enjoyed increasing support among the nation's lawmakers, however, and the inaugural of Carlos Pellegrini as President following a political crisis made the UIA a powerful influence for the first time. One of the first milestones in this new era was the 1891 customs law, which for the first time in Argentine history set tariffs on a number of imported industrial supplies at or below those of finished goods.

The return to Julio Roca to the Presidency in 1898 signalled a rollback in pro-industry government policy, however. The UIA reacted quickly, and in 1899, a rally of 70,000 industrial workers and supporters (in a city of half a million) gathered in front of Congress, where UIA President Francisco Seguí submitted a petition for a return of higher import tariffs. Upon receiving said petition, a member of the Congressional leadership stated that: "your banner is union, and seeing you united dispels all doubts as to your strength. The united hands of the worker and his boss is also on our national emblem."

Benefiting from its position as the world's leading recipient of investment from the British Empire, and the resulting expansion in railway lines, Argentine industry and agriculture both grew markedly in the late nineteenth and early twentieth centuries, and economic growth overall averaged 8% in the generation after 1880. Representing a sector which had grown to over 300,000 industrial workers by 1914, the UIA had become a fixture in policy discussions, and this presence was symbolized by the 1922 opening of their new headquarters on the Avenida de Mayo (at a roughly equidistant point between Congress and the presidential offices at the Casa Rosada).

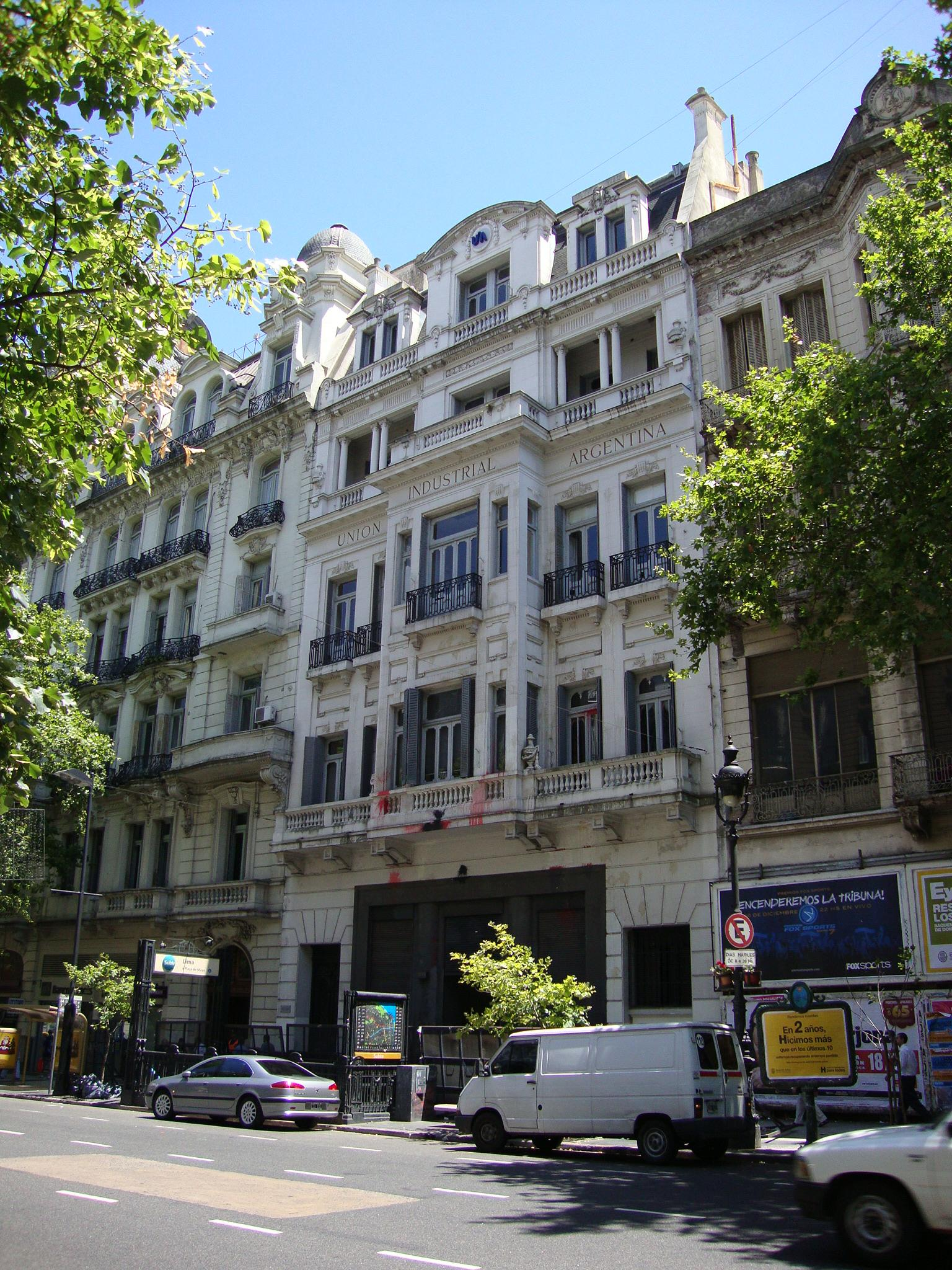
Headquarters of the Argentine Industrial Union on Avenida de Mayo, Buenos Aires

The UIA's influence continued to grow with the nation's manufacturing sector, whose output doubled between 1918 and 1929, alone. A 1930 coup d'état and the onset of the Great Depression erased many of these gains, initially. Saved from collapse by a resilient consumer sector, industry was hampered by a virtual halt in capital goods investment - almost all of which had to be imported. The 1933 Roca-Runciman Treaty, which further impeded the import of U.S.-made production machinery, was vocally opposed by the UIA (though without effect). Most long-standing, protective tariffs stood, however, and the economic recovery that began in the mid-1930s was fully extended to manufacturing.

Industrial production grew by 50% between 1935 and 1945, and its profile became more diversified, as well. Food processing, which had long dominated industry in Argentina, was rivaled by the textile industry in the 1940s. Industry employed nearly a million, and in 1943, its contribution to GDP had exceeded agriculture for the first time.

=== Political friction ===
The sudden prominence of the populist Labor Minister, Col. Juan Perón, was welcomed by the country's leading labor union, the CGT; but was looked upon warily by the UIA, which feared Perón support would embolden labor demands. Presented with national elections in 1946, the UIA vigorously supported the populist leader's opponent, José Tamborini. Perón's election that February handed the UIA its most serious setback since its establishment, however, when the President ordered it shuttered in 1947.

A faction led by smaller manufacturers established the General Economic Council (CGE), instead. The CGE enjoyed Perón's support, and helped shape his largely pro-industry agenda in subsequent years. Perón's 1955 overthrow, however, led to the UIA's reauthorization that December. Ongoing rivalry from the CGE led a faction of the UIA to coalesce with conservative interests once opposed to it (such as the Argentine Chamber of Commerce, the Buenos Aires Stock Exchange, and the Sociedad Rural Argentina) to establish ACIEL, a business roundtable, in 1959. ACIEL was also fostered by President Arturo Frondizi's Law of Foreign Investment, which helped usher in a wave of new, foreign industrial subsidiaries in the early 1960s. The rivalry between the CGE, the UIA, and ACIEL was stoked not only by the CGE's Peronist stance; but also by geographic rivalries between the UIA's increasingly Buenos Aires-centric membership and the CGE's more provincial one. Ultimately, however, foreign subsidiaries' disproportionate influence in the Juan Carlos Onganía dictatorship led to disputes with the UIA's domestic membership, and most of these subsidiaries withdrew from the UIA in favor of ACIEL in 1967.

Manufacturing continued to grow in Argentina: it nearly doubled in output between 1945 and 1960, and again from 1960 to 1974. Perón's return from exile in 1973 helped lead to a fusion of the UIA and the industrial wing of the CGE into the Argentine Industrial Confederation (CINA). In contrast to his previous presidency, Perón enjoyed good relations with the group; they figured prominently in discussions leading to Economy Minister José Ber Gelbard's 1973 Social Pact, and Perón, in turn, worked with the CGT to keep left-wing unions in check. Positioned more strongly amid a renewed economic boom, the UIA inaugurated its new headquarters in November 1974—a 31-story building named after their influential early supporter, President Carlos Pellegrini.

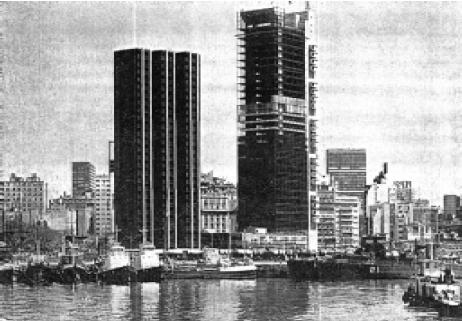
The new headquarters nears completion in 1973. A symbol of Argentine industrial growth, the building was sold to Pérez Companc in 2001.

This understanding soured after Perón's July 1974 death, however, and in 1975, his widow and successor (Isabel Perón) ordered CINA dismantled. The CGE retained a measure of support for Mrs. Perón, who was facing violent left-wing opposition, impeachment and the threat of a military coup. The much-anticipated March 1976 coup resulted in the CGE's ban, as well as in policies adverse to the nation's industrial sector.

The dictatorship's new Minister of the Economy, José Alfredo Martínez de Hoz, ordered wages frozen (amid 30% monthly inflation) and achieved an initial exchange rate stabilization. This led to a recovery in industrial production in 1977; but the effects of a series of wage freezes on consumer demand and the Economy Minister's strong peso policy helped lead to an uneven industrial performance in the late 1970s, and ultimately to crisis. Manufacturing declined by 20% in 1981-82, and in some sectors, such as the textile and motor vehicle industries, by more than half.

A decade of severe stagflation was followed by new Economy Minister Domingo Cavallo's Convertibility Plan, in April 1991. The plan was initially endorsed by the UIA, which in return was able to obtain significant concessions from Cavallo, a free trade supporter. Cavallo responded to an increase in dumping by restricting clothing imports, for instance, and the sudden, initial boom in GDP (which grew by a third in four years) was shared by manufacturing. The Mexican peso crisis of 1995 exposed industry to the combined effects of a recession, an uncompetitive Argentine peso and low import tariffs - though they maintained a cordial, if more critical, alliance with the free market-oriented President Carlos Menem. Lacking real influence in the Menem administration, particularly after Cavallo's 1996 removal, the UIA relied increasingly on its access to the Argentine press (notably Clarín, the nation's premier news daily).

The Convertibility Plan eventually became unsustainable, however, and a severe crisis led to the UIA's sale of the Carlos Pellegrini building to local conglomerate Pérez Companc in 2001, and to their relocation to their Belle Époque Avenida de Mayo headquarters.

=== Recovery and new challenges ===
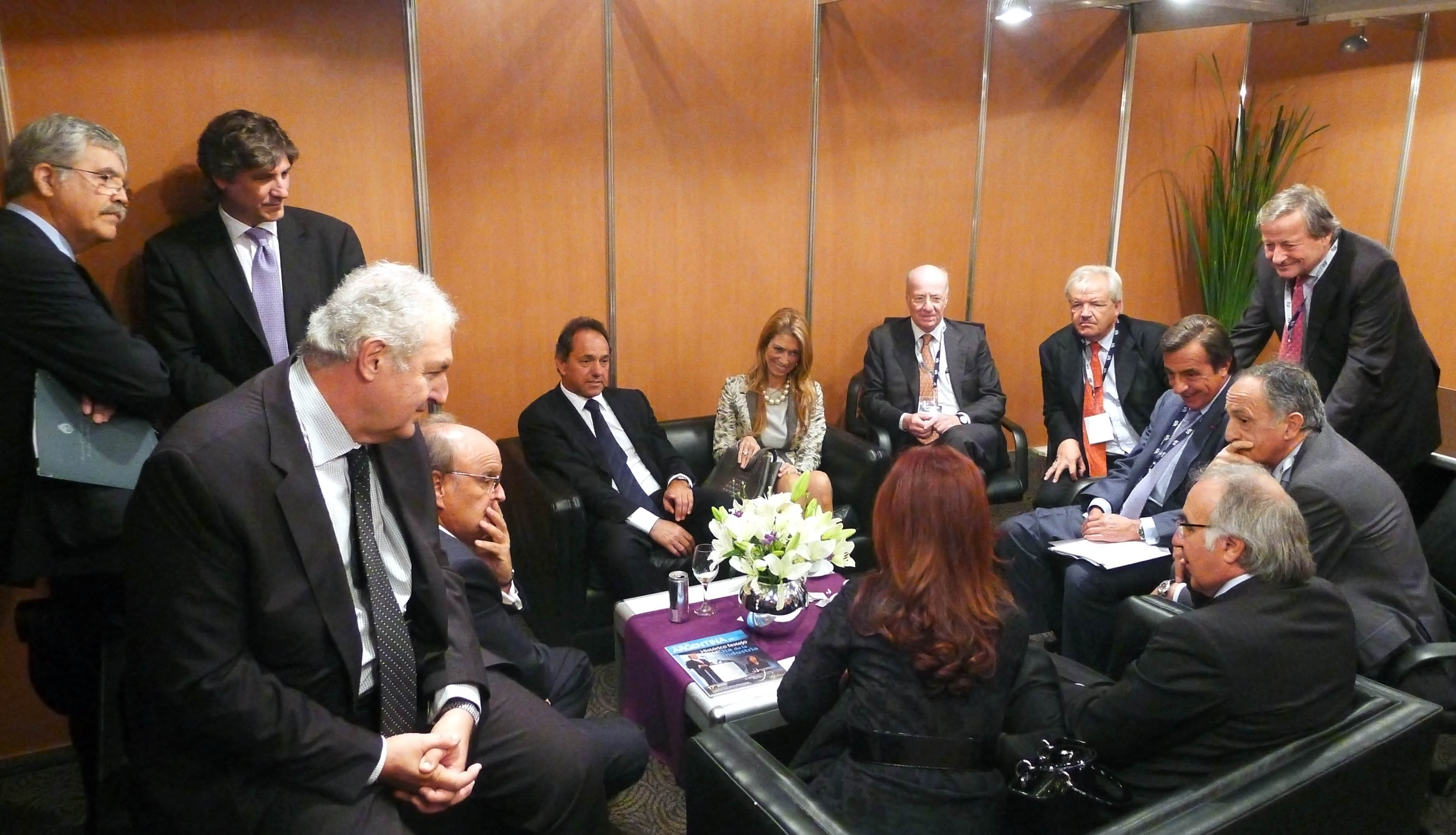
President Cristina Fernández de Kirchner confers with UIA leadership and public officials. The UIA remained broadly supportive of policies they see as pro-industry, while advocating for greater flexibility in these.

Following a chaotic and depressed 2002, the economy recovered beyond most observers' expectations. The appointment that April of a center-left economist who had helped shape the 1973 Social Pact, Roberto Lavagna, earned the UIA's support with his heterodox policy of regular wage increases, vigorous infrastructure investment, and a weak peso (which the Central Bank of Argentina maintained relatively undervalued by buying over 50 billion U.S. dollars in subsequent years). The economy and industry grew by over 60% between 2002 and 2008, and UIA's relationship with the two Kirchner administrations remained positive.

Subsequent evidence that the state statistical bureau, the INDEC, has had inflation and industrial production data altered prompted UIA demands for greater transparency in the hitherto highly respected bureau. Another point of contention arose with the administration's unwillingness to challenge Venezuelan President Hugo Chávez's nationalization of a Techint subsidiary (Techint is a leading steel and industrial parts producer). The dispute also led to the UIA's resistance to Venezuela's entry into the Mercosur Common Market, further distancing the influential group from the administration for a time. The UIA continued to support the Kirchner administration's expansionary policies in general, while maintaining differences with the administration over import restrictions that limited manufacturers' access to foreign-made parts and supplies.

In 2019 Carolina Castro was elected by the Asociación de Fábricas Argentinas de Componentes (Association of Argentine Component Factories) or AFAC to represent the automotive sector on the Executive Committee of the Argentine Industrial Union (UIA). She was the first woman to get a managerial position in the UIA in its 130 year-history.
