= Martín Rappallini =

Argentine lawyer and business executive

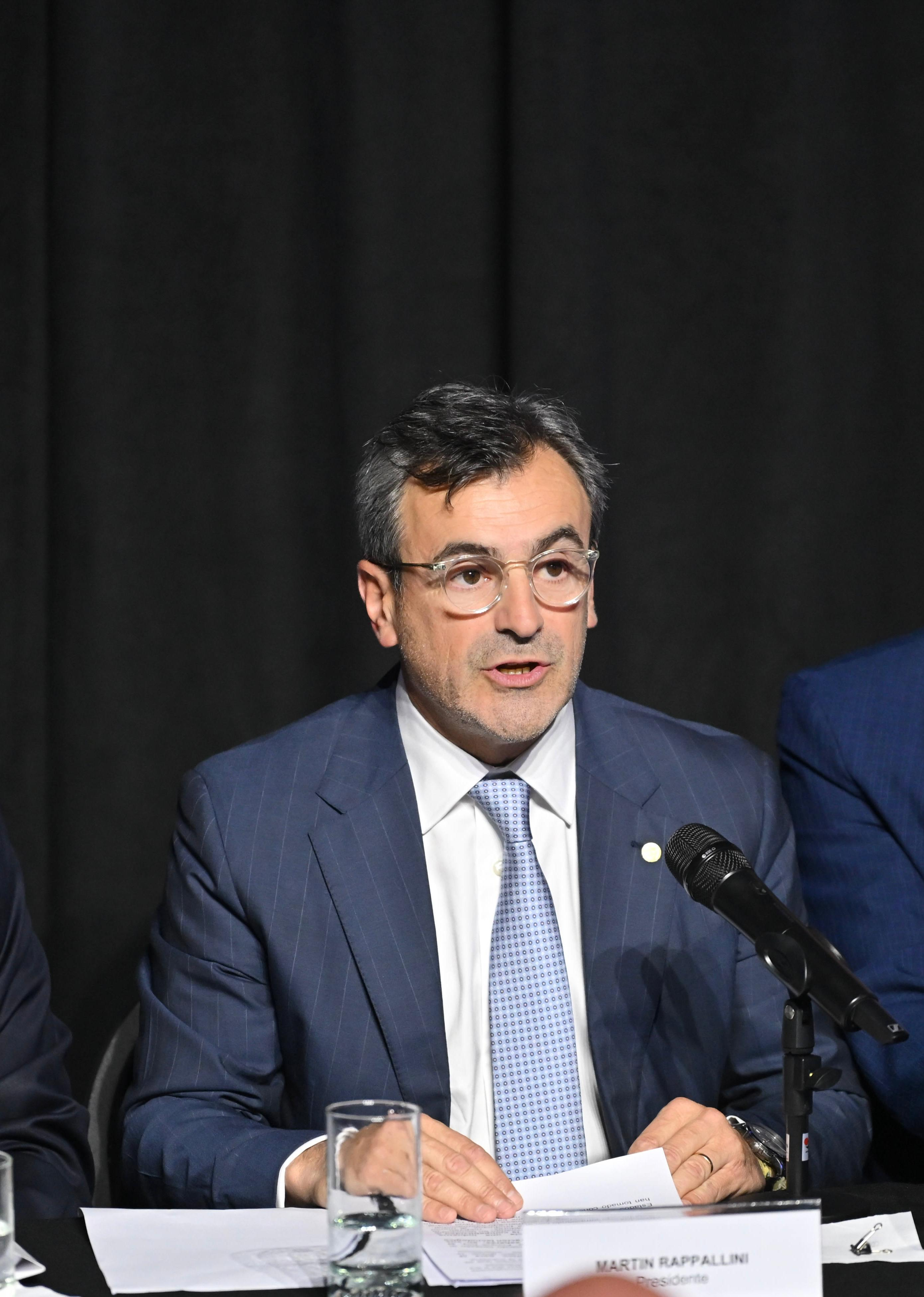
- Rappallini at the UIA headquarters, 2025

President of the Argentine Industrial Union (UIA)
- Incumbent
- Assumed office 29 April 2025
- Preceded by: Daniel Funes de Rioja

Personal details
- Born: November 1, 1968 (age 57) Maipú, Buenos Aires Province, Argentina
- Education: University of Belgrano (LL.B.)
- Occupation: Lawyer; business executive
- Known for: Leadership of the Argentine Industrial Union (2025–)

Martín Rappallini (born 1 November 1968) is an Argentine lawyer and business executive who has served as president of the Argentine Industrial Union (Unión Industrial Argentina, UIA) since April 2025. The UIA describes itself as Argentina’s largest manufacturing business association and the main voice of the industrial sector.

== Early life and education ==
Martín Rappallini was born on 1 November 1968 in Maipú, Buenos Aires Province. He studied law at the University of Belgrano from 1987 to 1992 and earned his law degree.

== Business career ==
In 1993, Rappallini acquired and began leading Cerámica Alberdi, a construction-materials company founded in 1907 and based in Greater Buenos Aires, later consolidating it within Grupo Alberdi. In 2025, trade publications reported technology upgrades at the company’s plants using SACMI Continua+ lines.

Beyond ceramics, he has worked in industrial real estate and park development through Alberdi Desarrollos and the Industrial Parks association RedPARQUES Industriales, which co-organises the Buenos Aires Industrial Parks Exposition (EPIBA).

== Argentine Industrial Union ==
Rappallini has been involved with the UIA and provincial industry bodies for decades. He served as president of the Industrial Union of Buenos Aires Province (Unión Industrial de la Provincia de Buenos Aires, UIPBA) from 2018, and within the UIA he chaired the Department of SMEs and Regional Development (2018–2021) and was treasurer (2021–2023).

On 29 April 2025, the UIA General Council elected him president for the 2025–2027 term, succeeding Daniel Funes de Rioja; the new leadership slate emphasised a federal industrial agenda including tax simplification and labour-market modernisation. International outlets later quoted him as UIA head in coverage of President Javier Milei’s post-election reform plans.

The UIA is Argentina’s principal manufacturing employers’ association and a member of the International Organisation of Employers. Its headquarters are on Avenida de Mayo in Buenos Aires.

== Government advisory role ==
In May 2025, the national government appointed Martín Rappallini as one of six counsellors to the Consejo de Mayo (May Council), designating him as the representative of "Entidades Gremiales Empresarias de Tercer Orden" (third-tier business guild entities). The appointment was made by Decree No. 382/2025 and published in the Official Gazette on 4 June 2025.

== Personal life ==
Rappallini as married to Inés, with whom he has five children. He has stated that he grew up in Maipú in a family involved in cosmetics manufacturing and that this background, together with his interest in industry from a young age, shaped his later career choices.

In addition to his law degree, he completed postgraduate studies in marketing and ontological coaching.

== Selected interviews ==
- Interviews and statements as UIA president on industry, taxation and labour during 2025, including pieces in La Nación, Ámbito Financiero, Infobae and El Diario AR.

== See also ==
- Argentine Industrial Union
- Economy of Argentina
- Javier Milei
