= Aleesha =

Aleesha is a female given name, which may refer to:

== People ==
- Aleesha Barber (born 1987), Trinidadian sprint hurdler
- Aleesha Rome, (born 1981), Australian pop singer
- Aleesha Young (born 1984), American bodybuilder

== Fictional characters ==
- Aleesha Cook, a Shortland Street character
- Aleesha Miller, an EastEnders character

== Film ==
- Aleesha (film), a 2004 Konkani language film

== See also ==
- Alesha
- Alyosha
