= Curtis Maxey =

American football player (born 1965)

No. 96, 71
- Positions: Defensive end, defensive tackle

Personal information
- Born: June 28, 1965 (age 61); Indianapolis, Indiana, U.S.
- Listed height: 6 ft 3 in (1.91 m)
- Listed weight: 298 lb (135 kg)

Career information
- High school: Broad Ripple (Indianapolis)
- College: Grambling State (1984–1987)
- NFL draft: 1988: 8th round, 195th overall pick

Career history
- Cincinnati Bengals (1988); Washington Redskins (1989)*; Atlanta Falcons (1989); Tampa Bay Buccaneers (1992)*
- * Offseason or practice squad member only

Career NFL statistics
- Games played: 5
- Stats at Pro Football Reference

Curtis Wilson Maxey (born June 28, 1965) is an American former professional football player who was a defensive end and defensive tackle in the National Football League (NFL) for the Cincinnati Bengals and Atlanta Falcons. He was selected by the Bengals in the eighth round of the 1988 NFL draft after playing college football for the Grambling State Tigers.

== Early life and college ==
Curtis Wilson Maxey was born on June 28, 1965, in Indianapolis, Indiana. He attended Broad Ripple High School in Indianapolis.

He played college football for the Grambling State Tigers from 1984 to 1987.

== Professional career ==
Maxey was selected by the Cincinnati Bengals in the eighth round, with the 195th overall pick, of the 1988 NFL draft. He signed with the team on May 5. He was placed on injured reserve on August 29 with an ankle injury. Maxey was activated from injured reserve on November 26, and played in three games for the Bengals during the 1988 regular season. He also appeared in one playoff game. He became a free agent after the season.

Maxey signed with the Washington Redskins on April 1, 1989. He was waived on September 4, 1989.

He was claimed off waivers by the Atlanta Falcons on September 5, 1989. Maxey appeared in two games for the Falcons before being released on September 26, 1989.

Maxey signed with the Tampa Bay Buccaneers on February 18, 1992. He was released on August 24, 1992.
