= Alicia Killaly =

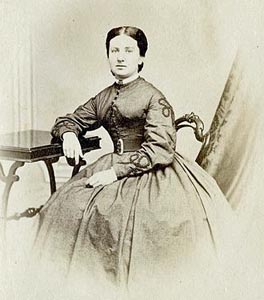
- Born: 1836; London, Ontario
- Died: 1908 (aged 71–72); Grantham, United Kingdom
- Known for: Painter
- Spouse: C. H. Turner

Alicia Killaly (also called Alice Killaly (Note: The Toronto Public Library has two watercolours listed as "Killaly, Alice Margaret, 1836–1916, attributed to", which does not match the 1908 date of death of Alicia Killaly. One of them has handwritten information on the back: "by A Killaly / Later Mrs Thackwell" in one hand and "By Mrs A Kilaly / Toronto." in another hand. These details also do not match Alicia Killaly. However, the dates of these two paintings as well as their medium and subject are similar to Alicia Killaly.); 1836–1908) was a Canadian watercolour painter. She was born in London, Upper Canada in 1836. She lived in Quebec City, Montreal and Toronto during the 1840s and 1850s. Killaly married Christopher Hatton Turnor, a former British soldier, in 1871 and moved to England. Killaly died in 1908 in Grantham, Lincolnshire.

A watercolour from the sketchbook of an unknown artist in the collection of the Toronto Public Library is titled Camping Out No. 2: Alice Killaly Sketching in a Canoe, Sparrow Lake, Ontario. May 1867. It shows the subject alone in a canoe in a lake, mostly hidden under a large umbrella.

Her work depicts outdoor scenes in Canada, such as canoe trips, frozen rivers and Niagara Falls, and she may have been a student of Cornelius Krieghoff. Her watercolour, Quebec From Across the St. Lawrence, from about 1867, is in the collection of the Royal Ontario Museum. An 1868 series of chromolithographs, A Picnic at Montmorency, on the subject of a humorous winter picnic is her only known commercial venture. Copies of these lithographs are held at the National Gallery of Canada, McCord Museum of Canadian History and the Royal Ontario Museum, where they were part of the 2013 exhibit, Brushing It in the Rough: Women, Art and Nineteenth Century Canada. She is not known to have produced any artworks after her marriage.

== Gallery ==
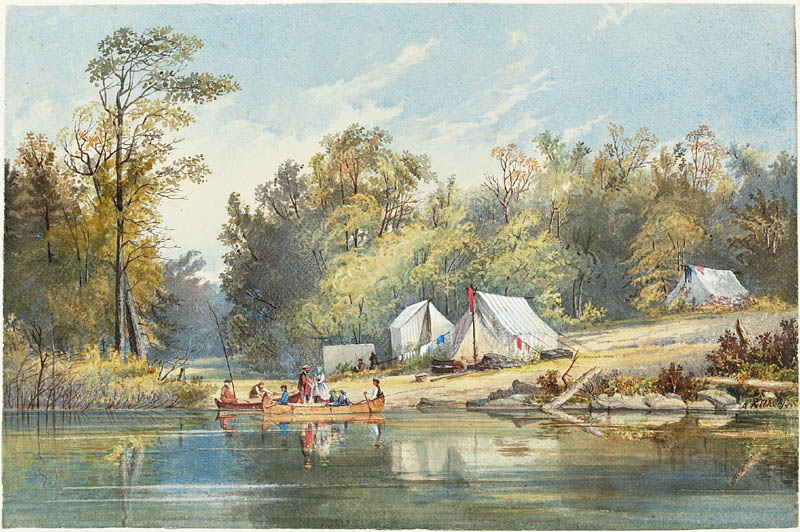
A Tenting Party, circa 1860. Watercolor, in the Peter Winkworth Collection, Library and Archives Canada

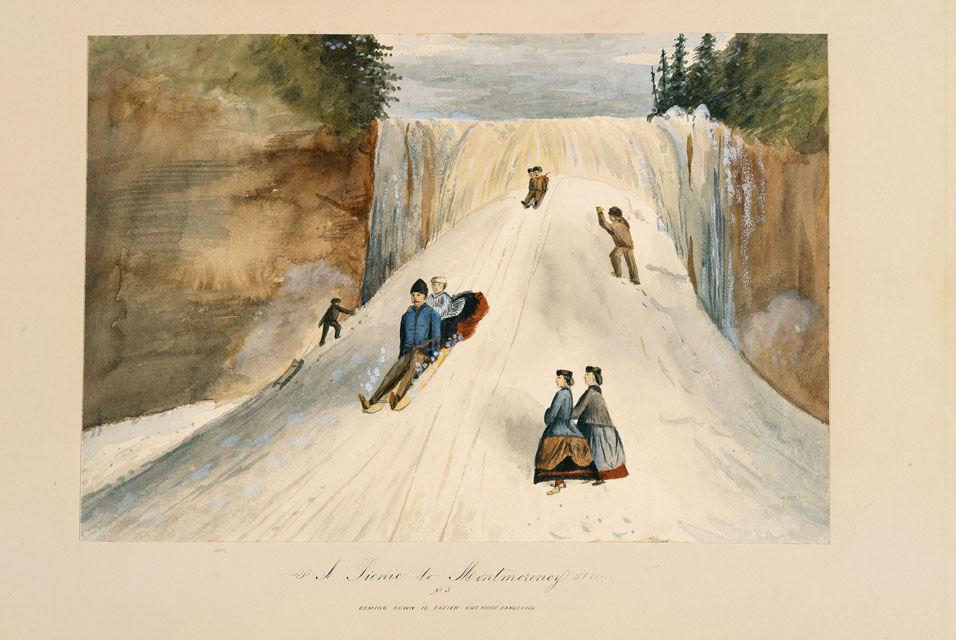
A Picnic at Montmorency - Coming down is easier but more dangerous, lithograph, 1868

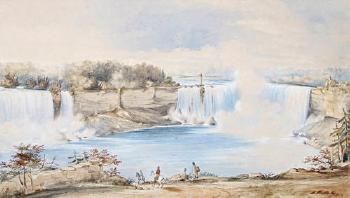
The Horseshoe Falls, 1857

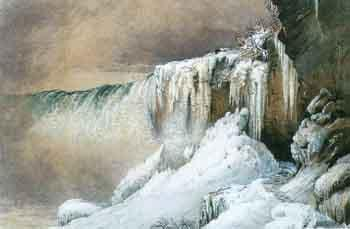
View of Horseshoe Falls, winter, circa 1860
