= Alicia's Diary =

1887 short story by Thomas Hardy

"Alicia's Diary" is a short story written by Victorian novelist Thomas Hardy in 1887. Presented as the diary of a young woman named Alicia, it recounts a tragic romance through her own entries. The story was first published in the Manchester Times on 15 and 22 October 1887, with American rights later sold to S. S. McClure. It was subsequently included in the 1913 collection A Changed Man and Other Tales.

== Plot ==
Her sister, Caroline, and their mother have gone to France, and eventually Alicia's suspicions are confirmed that Caroline has become engaged to an artist named Charles, who keeps postponing the wedding. Alicia's mother dies. Due to the death of their mother and the coldness and procrastination of Charles to her, Caroline is dying. Also, Alicia tries to leave them alone to catalyse the romantic process and to avoid charming Charles, who catches a glimpse of Alicia, and they soon fall in love with each other. Alicia then feels great guilt because of her incestuous feelings toward the fiancée of her sister. Alicia and Charles make a deal that Charles should marry the dying Caroline, but not tell her that it was not a legitimate marriage. If Caroline dies, Alicia and Charles can be married. If Caroline lives and does not want to marry Charles (after they tell her it was not a legitimate wedding), Alicia is free to marry Charles. The third option comes to pass, so Alicia must sacrifice her love for Charles and yield to her sister marrying Charles. Caroline and Charles get married. Shortly following the wedding, Charles leaves and does not return. Four months later, Alicia discovers that Charles drowned himself. Five years later, Alicia adds a final note that Caroline married a man named Higham, who was the one who pretended to marry Caroline and Charles. Alicia ends the short story by concluding that everyone involved in deceiving her sister has now repented (Higham by love, she says).
