= Alicia D. Monroe =

American physician

Alicia D. H. Monroe
- Born: Indianapolis
- Education: Brown University; Indiana University School of Medicine
- Scientific career
- Workplaces: Baylor College of Medicine; University of South Florida

Alicia D. H. Monroe is an American physician and the Provost of the Baylor College of Medicine. Her research considers physician-patient communication and medical education.

== Early life and education ==
Monroe was born in Indianapolis. Her mother was a beautician and her father worked for the United States Postal Service, and neither of her parents attended college. Monroe attended Broad Ripple High School, a public high school in Indiana. She has said that she was inspired by her childhood paediatrician, an African-American woman who mentored her throughout her time at high school. Monroe experienced a lot of premature death in her family, including her grandfathers and uncles. She lost her mother to Hodgkin's Disease and her father to lung cancer. Monroe has said that her mother's original symptoms were dismissed by her physician as being psychosomatic, which motivated Monroe to work on new ways to improve the patient-physician relationship. Monroe earned her bachelor's degree at Brown University in 1973. She studied medicine at the Indiana University School of Medicine, and remained in Indianapolis for her residency. Whilst at medical school Monroe was named Outstanding Medical Student of the Year. Monroe was a medical intern at the Georgetown University Medical Center.

== Research and career ==
Monroe joined the Alpert Medical School at Brown University. She was named Associate Dean for Minority Affairs in 1996. In 2007 she was made Associate Dean for Diversity within the Division of Biology and Medicine. Her research considered ways to improve physician-patient communication.

From 2008 Monroe was based at the University of South Florida where she led novel undergraduate medical programs. She worked with Lehigh Valley Health Network to create the SELECT program (Scholarly Excellence, Leadership Experiences, and Collaborative Training), which trains physicians to bring change into healthcare. The highly-selective programme launched in 2011 and used leadership training techniques to prepare medical students for the dynamic healthcare system of America. Whilst at USF Monroe was awarded the Diversity Leadership award from Brown University and the Indiana University School of Medicine Elise M. Coletta Leadership Award.

Monroe moved to Baylor College of Medicine in 2014. At Baylor, Monroe oversees academic affairs, K–12 education programmes at faculty development.

== Selected publications ==
- Wald, Hedy S.; Davis, Stephen W.; Reis, Shmuel P.; Monroe, Alicia D.; Borkan, Jeffrey M. (July 2009). "Reflecting on Reflections: Enhancement of Medical Education Curriculum With Structured Field Notes and Guided Feedback". Academic Medicine. 84 (7): 830–837. doi:10.1097/ACM.0b013e3181a8592f. ISSN 1040-2446. PMID 19550172. S2CID 10833063.
- Reis, Shmuel P.; Wald, Hedy S.; Monroe, Alicia D.; Borkan, Jeffrey M. (2010-08-01). "Begin the BEGAN (The Brown Educational Guide to the Analysis of Narrative) – A framework for enhancing educational impact of faculty feedback to students' reflective writing". Patient Education and Counseling. 80 (2): 253–259. doi:10.1016/j.pec.2009.11.014. ISSN 0738-3991. PMID 20056370.
