= Alicia Moore =

British novelist

Alicia Moore (born Alicia Ann Radford, Sheffield, England; 1790–1873) was a British novelist. She was the daughter of clergyman Thomas Radford (1748–1816) and Elizabeth (Gunning) Radford. She was the ninth of ten children with six brothers and three sisters, and married Robert Moore.

Moore was the author of Eveleen Mountjoy; or, Views of Life (1819), Rosalind and Felicia; or, The Sisters (1821) (later published as The Leycesters), and Historical Pictures of the Middle Ages (1846).

Henry Rowland Brown (1837–1921) dedicated his illustrated guide book The Beauties of Lyme Regis and Charmouth to her.
