= Kersten Artus =

German journalist and politician

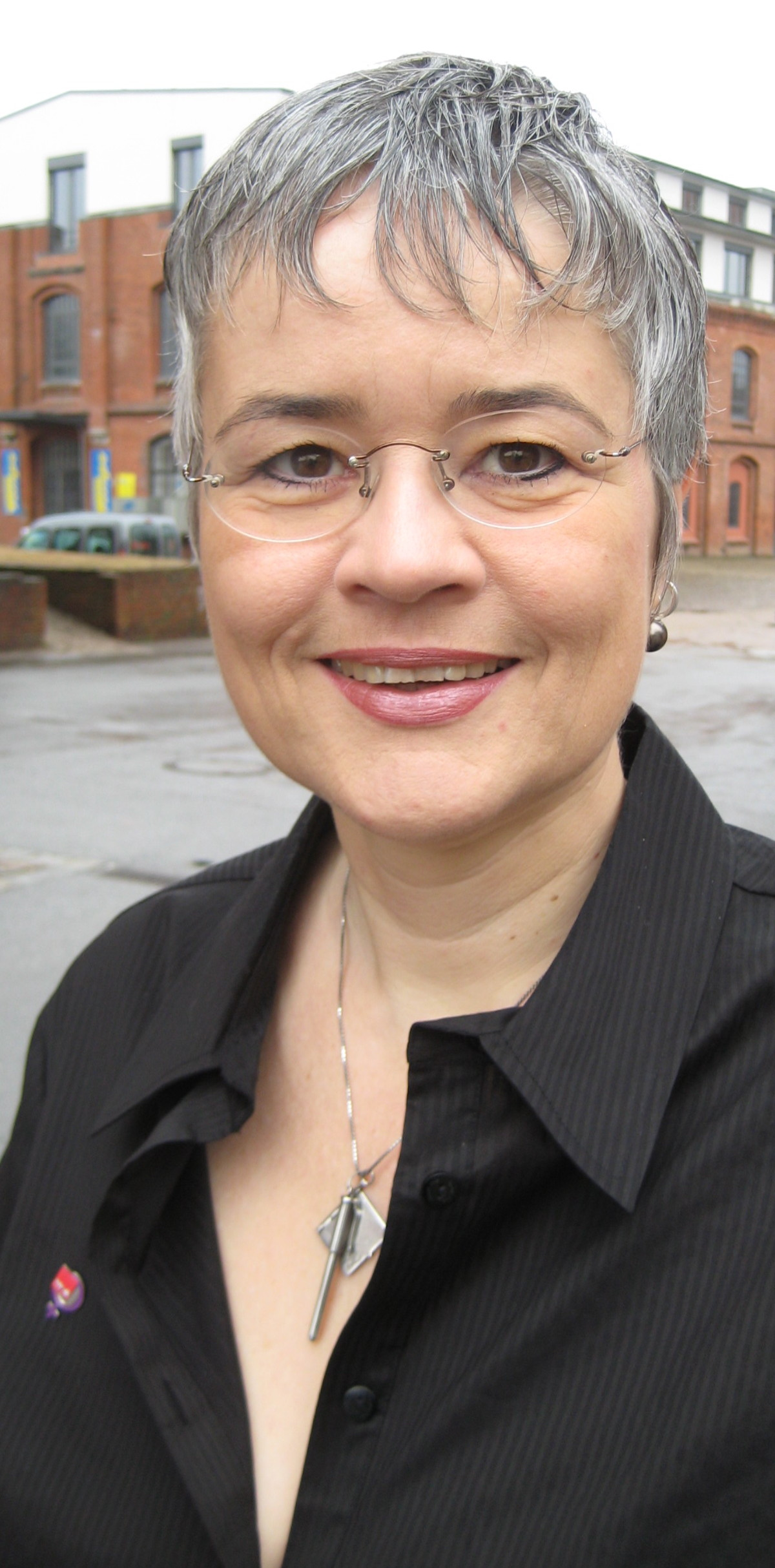
- Kersten Artus

Member of the Hamburg Parliament
- Incumbent
- Assumed office 2008

Personal details
- Born: April 1, 1964 (age 62) Bremen
- Party: The Left

Kersten Artus (née Westphal, born April 1, 1964) is a German journalist and politician. She is a member of The Left and a member of the Hamburg Parliament.

== Life ==
Kersten Artus was born in Bremen. She moved to Hamburg in 1982 and worked as a Merchant and Documentalist. In 1998 she became editor in Bauer Media Group. Since 1893 she has been a member of Works councils within the Bauer Media Group and chairwoman since 1994. She is member of Vereinte Dienstleistungsgewerkschaft.

Karsten Artus started her political career in the German Schülerbewegung (pupil's movement) in Bremen and in the Peace movement. She was a member of the Socialist German Workers Youth and a member of the German Communist Party from 1983 to 1989. In the 1990. she was a member of the Party of Democratic Socialism for two years. She became a member of The Left. In the Hamburg state election 2008 she was elected to the Hamburg Parliament.
