= Alisha (Alisha Chinai album) =

Studio album by Alisha Chinai
- Released: 2001
- Genre: Indipop
- Label: Tips
- Producer: Sandeep Chowta

Alisha Chinai chronology
Dil ke Rani (1998)	Alisha (2001)	Soniya (2002)

Alisha is a 2001 punk rock alternative album by Alisha Chinai. The album was an attempt by the singer to reinvent herself, and was a moderate commercial success. It was composed by Sandeep Chowta.

== Track listing ==
1. Seulement-Vous (Only you)
2. Ishq Se Ishq
3. Dilbar Jaaniya
4. Maashuka
5. Woh Pyaar Meraa
6. Soniyaa
7. Don't Want Your Love
8. Aayi Teri Yaad
9. Dhuaan Dhuaan
10. Can You Dance
