= Alicia Berneche =

American lyric coloratura soprano

Alicia Berneche (born January 1, 1971) is an American lyric coloratura soprano who has sung leading roles in operas throughout the United States.

Berneche was born in Kokomo, Indiana and went to Kokomo High School where she played violin and starred in school plays. Intending to major in Acting and Poetry Composition in college, a last-minute decision to take voice lessons changed her major mid-year to singing.

She studied voice with Vergene Miller, theatre, and poetry at DePauw University (1989–1993) and was the only voice major in her class. She then became the inaugural candidate for the Graduate Performance Diploma at the Peabody Institute (1993–1995), mentored by the late John Lehmeyer. She directly performed at Ohio Light Opera. She continued her professional training apprenticing at the Orlando Opera (1995), the joining the Lyric Opera Center for American Artists (1996–1998) in Chicago.

She performed frequently at Lyric Opera of Chicago, culminating in her popular and critical success as Daisy Buchanan in the second performance of John Harbison's The Great Gatsby after Dawn Upshaw bowed out of the production. She subsequently performed in the world premiere of Galileo Galilei by Philip Glass and Mary Zimmerman at the Goodman Theatre in Chicago, the Brooklyn Academy of Music in New York City, and the Barbican Centre in London.

Berneche specializes in new music, performing and premiering works by Schulamit Ran, Aaron Jay Kernis, John Harbison, Hugo Weisgall, Philip Glass, Mathew Rosenblum, Lita Grier (b.1937), Robert Kritz, Luciano Berio, Benjamin Britten, Francis Poulenc, Drew Hemenger, Kirke Mechem, Richard Wargo, Michale John LaChiusa, Ricky Ian Gordon, Marc Blitzstein, Robert Ward, Arenski, Szymanowski, Arnold Schoenberg, and Jacob Druckman.

Alicia Berneche has sung in houses all over the United States, including Austin Lyric Opera, Arizona Opera, Kentucky Opera, Opera Pacific, Virginia Opera, Orlando Opera, Skylight Opera, Sarasota Opera, and has been on the roster of the New York Metropolitan Opera
