= Alicia Herrera Rivera =

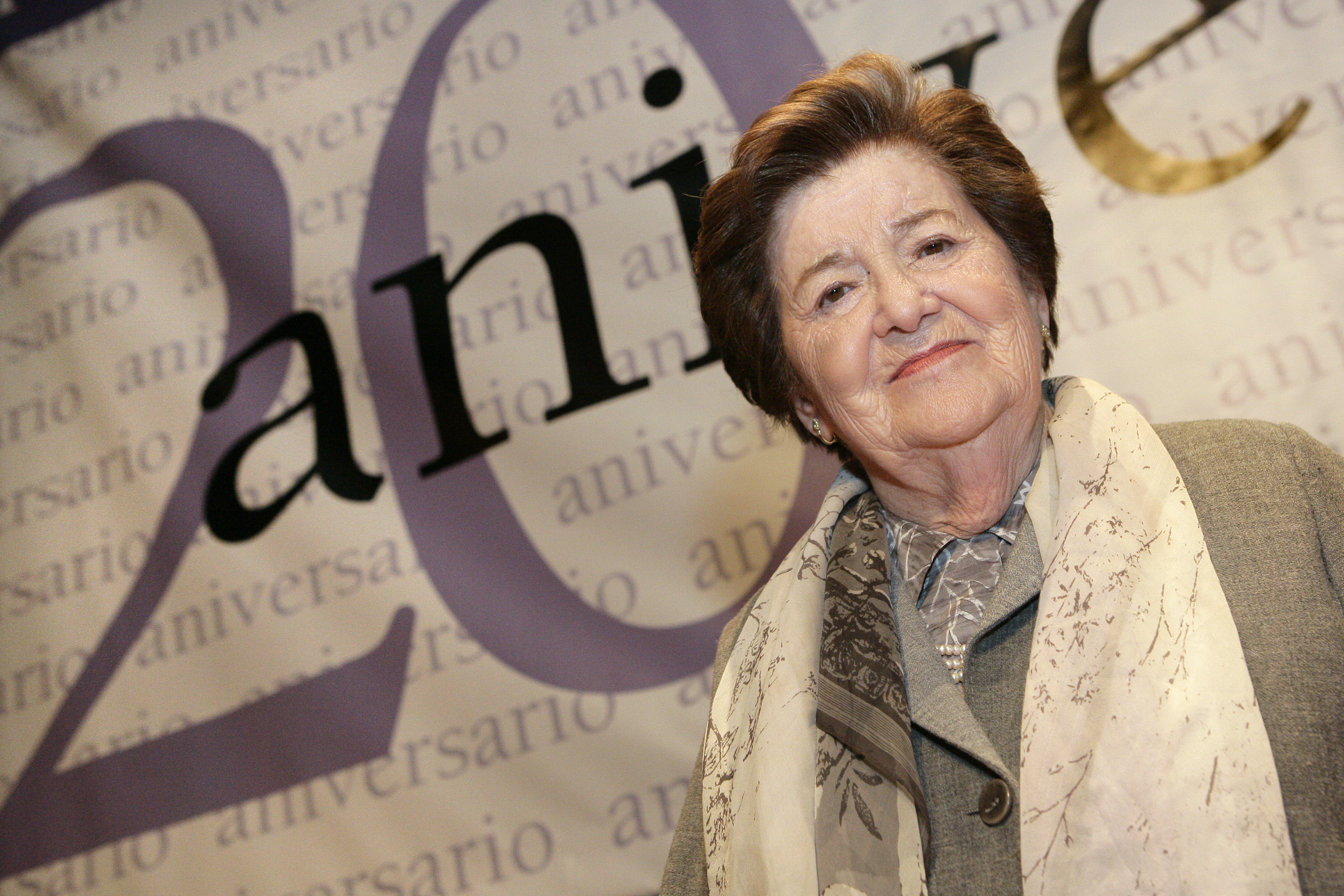
Alicia Herrera Rivera

Alicia Herrera Rivera (May 12, 1928 - April 6, 2013) was a Chilean feminist lawyer and minister of the Court of Appeals of Santiago.

== Biography ==
Alicia Herrera Rivera was born in Valparaíso, May 12, 1928. She believed that her origin in the seaport town deeply determined her way of being and her own history. She grew up enjoying reading, music and studies. Both she and her three sisters and two of her brothers were raised in an environment of respect, solidarity and humanism where the freedom and trust granted by her parents forged her determined and independent personality .

She studied law at the University of Santiago, Chile, where she graduated in 1954. A month later, she married the lawyer and socialist politician, Alejandro Jiliberto Zepeda.

After Pinochet's 1973 Chilean coup d'état, she suffered dictatorial oppression, was the victim of kidnapping by agents of the Dirección de Inteligencia Nacional (DINA), and was finally forced into exile in Europe, living in Romania, East Germany, and finally, in Spain.

A pioneer in the fight for the rights against mistreatment and discrimination of women, Rivera and a group of lawyers co-founded, in 1987, the Asociación de Mujeres Juristas Themis (Association of Women Jurists Themis), dedicated to promoting gender equality and make the constitutional principle of legal protection of women's rights a reality.

In March 1987, Pinochet issued several decrees granting authorization to return to Chile for some exiles. Among the lists appeared the name of Alicia Herrera Rivera, who flew to Santiago on April 3, twelve years after she left for exile. After spending a season there, she participated in the 1988 Chilean national plebiscite, in which the "No to Pinochet" triumphed. After that, Alicia Herrera returned to Spain convinced that her return to Chile would soon become a reality and forever. Rivera died on April 6, 2013, in Santiago.

== Awards ==
In 2000, as honorary president of Themis, she was awarded the Silver Cross of the Civil Order of Social Solidarity of the Ministry of Labor.

== Selected works ==
- "La mujer, objeto y sujeto de culturización", Jornadas de feminismo socialista. Editorial Mariarce, Madrid. (1984)
- "La mujer chilena ante el derecho". Araucaria de Chile. No. 30. Madrid. (1985)
