= Barb Samardzich =

American business executive (born 1958)

- Born: September 21, 1958 (age 66); Long Beach, New York
- Occupation: business executive

Barbara Jean "Barb" Samardzich (born September 21, 1958) is an American business executive who worked for Ford from 1990 to 2016. From November 2013 to 2016, she served Chief Operating Officer of Ford of Europe.

== Early life ==
Samardzich received a bachelor's degree in mechanical engineering from the University of Florida and master's degrees in mechanical engineering (Carnegie-Mellon University) and industrial engineering (Wayne State University).

== Career ==
At the beginning of her professional life, Samardzich worked at Westinghouse Electric. In 1990 she moved to Ford, where she held various management positions in the areas of product development, quality and powertrain development.

She had been working in Europe since 2011, first as Vice President for Product Development, and from Autumn 2013 to October 1, 2016, as Chief Operating Officer of Ford of Europe.

== Honors and awards ==
- 2005 and 2010 recognition as Leading Woman in the North American Automotive Industry (Automotive News)
- 2006 Distinguished Women Award from Northwood University
- 2007 Recognized as one of the Most Influential Women (Crain’s Detroit Business)
- 2009 and 2010 Automotive News All Star
- 2011 Top 50 women in the automotive industry (Automobilwoche)
