= Alicia Chong Rodriguez =

Engineer and inventor

- Born: San José, Costa Rica
- Education: Massachusetts Institute of Technology; Costa Rica Institute of Technology; Monterrey Institute of Technology and Higher Education; Singularity University
- Employer: Teradyne

Alicia Chong Rodriguez is an engineer and inventor who is founder of Bloomer Tech. She designs wearable technologies that can allow for personalized healthcare, particularly in the treatment of cardiovascular disease in women. She was named a TED fellow in 2021.

== Early life and education ==
Chong Rodriguez is from San José, Costa Rica. She visited Massachusetts Institute of Technology as a high school student. She filled out an application to attend, but realized that her family could not handle the financial pressure. Chong spent two years at the Costa Rica Institute of Technology, before completing her Bachelor's degree in electronic engineering at the Monterrey Institute of Technology and Higher Education. As an undergraduate student, she founded a group called Mujeres en Tecnología to help woman engineers empower one another. After graduating, Chong Rodriguez returned to Costa Rica, where she worked as an engineer at Teradyne. She spent six years in industry before returning to a three-month summer program at Singularity University, where she started to appreciate the potential social impacts of technology. Chong Rodriguez learned that women were underrepresented in research about heart disease, which impacts around 44 million women in the United States. Chong Rodriguez became concerned that as women were underrepresented in clinical trials and scientific research teams, women's symptoms of heart disease were often missed or overlooked. Whilst a student on Singularity University's Global Solutions program, Chong Rodriguez identified that the electrocardiogram devices used to monitor heart abnormalities in women did not provide reliable data. She returned to the Massachusetts Institute of Technology as a Master's candidate, where she worked toward an integrated design and management program. She partnered with her classmates Monica Abarca and Aceil Halaby to use a bra as a tracking advice.

== Career ==
Chong Rodriguez founded Bloomer Tech after graduating from Massachusetts Institute of Technology. The company is named after Amelia Bloomer, an activist for women's rights who encouraged women to wear loose-fitting pants. The Bloomer bra, which is designed to fit the curvature of a woman's body, went into clinical trials in 2018. The bras embedded washable, stretchable and modular sensors. Chong Rodriguez explained that the biggest challenge was achieving a medical-grade signal in the absence of noise, as well as creating a bra that was aesthetically pleasing and comfortable to wear. She oversaw the creation of a mobile app that could collect data and provide activity reports. As part of her 2021 TED fellowship described her design of the smart bra.

In addition, Chong Rodriguez is committed to improving diversity in engineering. Alongside launching Mujeres en Tecnología, Chong Rodriguez launched an engineering programme for at-risk young women.

== Innovation ==
Chong Rodriguez is most well-known for partnering with Bloomer Tech Company to develop a bra that is able to record vital data including heart rate and heart rhythm. This was monumental because traditional heart monitors weren't very adaptable or comfortable for women, causing doctors to misunderstand female cardiovascular data and women's heart problems. By putting sensors in a bra, which is something women already wear every day, Bloomer Tech made it easier to get accurate health data in a more natural way. This innovation was significant because it addressed a real pain point that women were facing, and it helped to make healthcare more comfortable and effective for the female body. What stands out about Rodriguez's invention is that she kept women's bodies at the forefront of her mind from the outset; traditionally, women have been treated as second-class citizens in the medical field, but this time around, things were different. The invention was both a groundbreaking innovation and a solution for tackling the injustice of the way healthcare services functioned because the device had women in mind from the get-go. In other words, Rodriguez managed to increase awareness when it comes to women's value and rights, and that their health concerns should be considered when developing any kind of healthcare technology.

== Legacy and Impact ==
The work of Chong Rodriguez aims to make it easier to detect and monitor heart disease in women. Heart disease is still one of the top causes of death for women, but for a long time, women have not been included enough in research and testing when it comes to heart health. Bloomer Tech brought attention to this problem by creating a product designed for women. Bloomer Tech is one of several female-led startups working on women's heart health.

Rodriguez' technology was first introduced to the public over a decade ago, but it's no less relevant today. National Heart, Lung, and Blood Institute reports, “Bloomer Tech's smart bra for women to improve detection and prevention of heart disease in women.”. Rodriguez, however, made more than a ripple effect in the field of wearable technology. Her work and designs affected many industries throughout her career. She touched many bases by bringing awareness to an important aspect of innovation and the importance of fairness and equality in health, research and many other areas. She attacked gender inequality when it came to health and technology.

== Awards and honors ==
- MIT Legatum Fellowship
- MIT Graduate Women of Excellence Award
- Medtech Boston 40 under 40 Healthcare Innovator
- Inc. (magazine) Top 100 Female Founders
- TED fellow
