= Alicia Drake =

British fashion journalist and author

Alicia Drake (born 1968), is a British fashion journalist and author. She is best known for her 2007 non-fiction work The Beautiful Fall : Fashion, Genius and Glorious Excess in 1970s Paris which focused on the rise of designers Karl Lagerfeld and Yves Saint-Laurent. She has lived and worked in Paris for the last 10 years.

== Biography ==
Alicia Drake was educated at Cambridge University.

She has been a fashion journalist, writing regularly for a variety of publications, including the International Herald Tribune, Travel and Leisure, W Magazine and British Vogue, for which she was a contributing editor.

Drake's non-fiction book, The Beautiful Fall : Fashion, Genius and Glorious Excess in 1970s Paris is the story of two fashion designers living and working in Paris during the 1970s. The "deliciously dramatic" book "sets the concentrated world of couture against the always-on social scene of 1970s Paris". After the release of the book, designer Karl Lagerfeld sued for "damages for intrusion into his private life" in the French court. Drake rejected the claims and the case was dismissed by the Court in a judgment on 15 January 2007, with an order that Lagerfeld pay Drake's costs. The French version of the book was published by Denoël, under the title “Beautiful People” in 2008. Beautiful People was named non-fiction book of the year by RTL Lire 2008.

In 2018, Drake published her debut novel, I Love You Too Much, about a young Parisian boy adjusting to life after the divorce of his narcissistic upper-class parents.

== Selected works ==
- The Beautiful Fall : Fashion, Genius and Glorious Excess in 1970s Paris (2007)
- I Love You Too Much (2018)
