= Alicia Burke =

Jamaican fashion model

- Born: 1993 or 1994 (age 31–32); Saint Catherine Parish, Jamaica
- Occupation: Model
- Modeling information
- Hair color: Brown
- Eye color: Brown
- Agency: Pulse Models (Kingston); Elite Model Management (New York City); Supreme Model Management (New York City, Paris, Milan); Models 1 (London); Le Management (Copenhagen, Stockholm)

Alicia Burke is a Jamaican fashion model.

== Career ==
Before modeling, Burke planned to become a midwife. Burke was discovered by Pulse Models at their Caribbean Model Search competition, which she won; Pulse connected her to other agencies in the United States and Europe. A year later debuted at the F/W 2016 Bottega Veneta show, and walked for Miu Miu, Gucci, Schiaparelli, Dolce & Gabbana, Tommy Hilfiger, Stella McCartney, Ralph Lauren, Prabal Gurung, Blumarine, and Emporio Armani among others. Burke has also walked for Valentino, Chloé, Jason Wu, La Perla, Anna Sui, Diane von Fürstenberg, Oscar de la Renta, and Carolina Herrera.

In addition to appearing on the covers of Vogue Italia and Harper's Bazaar UK, she has appeared in multiple beauty advertisements for Bobbi Brown, Gucci, Laura Mercier, NARS Cosmetics, Saks Fifth Avenue, and Tom Ford, for which models.com ranks her as a "Money Girl". She has done editorials for WSJ, Vogue Japan, Harper's Bazaar, Marie Claire, Interview, V, and Vogue Paris.
