= A Changed Man and Other Tales =

A Changed Man and Other Tales is a collection of twelve tales written by Thomas Hardy. The collection was originally published in book form in 1913, although all of the tales had been previously published in newspapers or magazines from 1881 to 1900. There are eleven short stories and a novella The Romantic Adventures of a Milkmaid. At the end of the book there is a map of the imaginary Wessex of Hardy's novels and poems. Six of the stories were published before 1891 and therefore lacked international copyright protection when the collection began to be sold in October 1913.

== Table of contents ==
- A Changed Man
- A Waiting Supper
- Alicia's Diary
- The Grave by the Handpost
- Enter a Dragoon
- A Tryst at an Ancient Earthwork
- What the Shepherd Saw
- A Committee-Man of 'The Terror'
- Master John Horseleigh, Knight
- The Duke's Reappearance
- A Mere Interlude
- The Romantic Adventures of a Milkmaid
