= Alicia (submarine) =

Research and tourism submarine

History
- Name: Alicia
- Builder: Marlin Submarines
- Cost: $2 million
- Completed: 2004

General characteristics
- Class & type: AP6
- Displacement: 18 tonnes
- Length: 11.2 m (36 ft 9 in)
- Propulsion: 98 kW diesel engine (surfaced); 15 kW electric motor (submerged)
- Endurance: 72 hours max. time submerged
- Test depth: 410 m (1,350 ft)
- Capacity: 6 persons

Alicia (Marlin Submarines AP6) is a 6-seater submarine designed and built by Marlin Submarines of Plymouth, England. It was designed primarily for research and tourism purposes and could reach depths of up to 305 m (1,001 ft). It includes a forward section constructed from transparent acrylic panes for greater visibility, as compared to the portholes of traditional submarine vehicles. Alicia was pressure tested down to 410 m (1,350 ft) (required is 375 m (1,230 ft)). The budget was US$1.5 million, and the final cost ended at US$2 million. Adjusting the dive angle is partially accomplished by sliding the battery holder, weighing 1,750 kg (3,860 lb), back and forth on rails.

== Visibility ==
The passenger section of the pressure hull consists of two intersecting transparent acrylic spheres produced by Stanley Plastics Ltd, West Sussex. The spheres have an internal diameter of 1.85 m (6 ft 1 in) and are 100 mm (3.9 in) thick, allowing passengers to have a wide field of view.

The vessel is the first ever to employ this twin-sphere geometry. The craft is a 30% larger version of the US Submarine Discovery's design concept, also created by Marlin Submarines in 1995 prior to the Alicia's development. Discovery's internal diameter is just 1.44 m (4 ft 9 in) to reduce the crane weight. The passenger section of the Alicia, at 1.85 m (6 ft 1 in) internal diameter, has just over twice the volume.

== Diesel-electric versatility ==
The diesel-electric configuration of the Alicia allows the submarine to be placed on station at the dive site relatively rapidly, without the need for a large towing vessel and without eating into battery reserves. In addition, it is possible to charge the air banks (used to "blow" the main ballast tanks) when under way on the surface, reducing maintenance time at the dock. Charging the main battery using the diesel engine to drive the main motor as a generator is also possible. The next generation will use the same rare-earth motor technology as S201. The motor will take the full power from the diesel generator set and, like S201, drives the propeller without the need for a reduction gear.

== Vessel status ==
Commanded by Richard Dawson, a member of the design team, the Alicia, AP6 prototype successfully completed sea trials in 2004. These started in No. 2 Basin in Devonport Dockyard and then continued in open water south of Plymouth Breakwater. 25 dives were successfully completed. The test dives reached 180 feet (55 m) with the surveyor on board. The vessel proved very easy to control and could hover a few inches above the seabed. At slow speed, a great variety of sea life could be observed. A final dive took a World War 2 U-Boat veteran to visit the last ship he had sunk, the James Egan Lane. The submarine is now in the US.
