= Alesha-class minelayer =

- An Alesha-class minelayer

Class overview
- Operators: Soviet Navy
- Built: 1967–1969
- In commission: 1967–1996
- Completed: 3
- Scrapped: 3

General characteristics
- Type: Minelayer
- Displacement: 2,900 t (2,900 long tons) standard; 3,740 t (3,680 long tons) full load
- Length: 99 m (324 ft 10 in)
- Beam: 13.5 m (44 ft 3 in)
- Draught: 5.4 m (17 ft 9 in)
- Propulsion: 4 diesels, 2 shafts producing 8,000 bhp (6,000 kW)
- Speed: 17 knots (31 km/h; 20 mph)
- Range: 4,000 nmi (7,400 km; 4,600 mi) at 16 knots (30 km/h; 18 mph)
- Complement: 190
- Sensors & processing systems: Search radar: Strut Curve; Fire control radar: Muff Cob; Navigation: Don 2 radar; IFF: High Pole B
- Armament: 1 × quad 57 mm (2.2 in)/80 cal. guns; 4 × stern-mounted mine tracks equipped with 300 naval mines

The Alesha-class minelayers, known in the Soviet Union as Project 317 or the Alyosha Popovich class, were a class of three ships in service with the Soviet Navy beginning in 1967. Designated minelayers (Russian: zagraditel minny) by the Soviet Navy, they could also be used as netlayers, command ships and act in a general support role. Equipped with naval mines, one ship of the class was assigned to each major fleet, one with the Northern Fleet, one with the Pacific Fleet and one with the Black Sea Fleet. All three ships were deleted in the 1990s.

== Background and description ==
The Project 137 ships, designated minelayers (Russian: zagraditel minny) by the Soviet Navy, measured 99 metres (324 ft 10 in) long with a beam of 13.5 m (44 ft 3 in) and a draught of 5.4 m (17 ft 9 in). They had a standard displacement of 2,900 metric tons (2,900 long tons) and a full load displacement of 3,740 t (3,680 long tons). (Note: Other sources have the ships measuring 97.0 m (318 ft 3 in) long with a beam of 14.0 m (45 ft 11 in) and a full load displacement of 3,500 t (3,400 long tons).) The ships were powered by four Kolomna 37D diesel engines powering two generators and turning two shafts creating 6,000 kilowatts (8,000 bhp). This gave the ships a maximum speed of 17 knots (31 km/h; 20 mph) and a range of 4,000 nautical miles (7,400 km; 4,600 mi) at 16 knots (30 km/h; 18 mph) or 8,500 nmi (15,700 km; 9,800 mi) at 8 kn (15 km/h; 9.2 mph).

The minelayers were armed with four 57-millimetre (2.2 in)/80-calibre guns situated in a single quad mount forward. At the stern were four tracks for deploying naval mines. They carried up to 300 mines. The ships were equipped with Strut Curve surface search radar operating on the F band, Don 2 navigational radar operating on the I band, Muff Cob fire control radar operating on the G/H bands and High Pole B identification friend or foe. At some point, the High Pole B was replaced with Cage Flask and Salt Vat masts.

== Construction and career ==
Three ships were constructed between 1967 and 1969. They were named Pripyat, Sukhona, and Vychegda. Dubbed Project 137 by the Soviet Navy, the class was given the name Alyosha Popovich class in Russian, but were assigned the reporting name Alesha by NATO. Pripyat was assigned to the Soviet Black Sea Fleet, while Sukhona operated with the Northern Fleet. Vychegda was stationed with the Pacific Fleet. Constructed as minelayers, the vessels were used as multi-purpose support ships, operating as netlayers, rescue ships, tender ships, and command ships. The first ship taken out of service, Pripyat, was deleted in 1994. The other two were deleted in 1996.
