= Alicia Cárdeñas =

Mexican volleyball player (born 1943)

Personal information
- Born: 30 October 1943 (age 81); Tamaulipas, Mexico

Sport
- Sport: Volleyball

Alicia Cárdeñas (born 30 October 1943) is a Mexican volleyball player. She competed in the women's tournament at the 1968 Summer Olympics.
