= Alicia Bruce =

British photographer

- Born: 1979; Aberdeen
- Education: Edinburgh Napier University
- Known for: Photography
- Website: https://aliciabruce.co.uk/

Alicia Bruce is an Edinburgh-based photographer, lecturer and freelance educator.

== Early life and education ==
Bruce was born in Aberdeen in 1979. She studied Photography, Film and Imaging at Edinburgh Napier University, graduating in 2006.

== Career ==
Bruce's work focuses on the collaboration between artist and sitter in portrait photography. Her most recent projects have involved communities, such as ‘Menie: A portrait of a North East community in conflict’. Alongside her work as a practicing photographer, Bruce is a Teaching Fellow at Edinburgh College of Art and was previously a freelance educator at the National Galleries of Scotland.

She has worked on several commissions and campaigns, including those from: Edinburgh World Heritage, NewsDirect, National Galleries of Scotland, Royal Scottish Academy, University of St Andrews, The European Parliament, NHS, V&A Dundee.

She won the Royal Scottish Academy Morton Award in 2014.

=== Selected solo exhibitions ===
2018 ‘Violence Unseen’ Stills, Edinburgh, UK (Touring commission for Zero Tolerance)

2016 ‘Menie: TRUMPED’ St Andrews Photography Festival, UK

2015 ‘The Sim Project’, The Royal Scottish Academy, Edinburgh, UK

2015 ‘Digging for Diamonds’, EU Buildings, Brussels, Belgium

2013 ‘Encore’ Royal Welsh College of Music & Drama, Cardiff, Part of Diffusion Festival

2013 ‘Menie’ The Scottish Parliament, Edinburgh, UK

2008 ‘Alicia Bruce: Artist in Residence’, Aberdeen Art Centre, Aberdeen, UK

=== Collections ===
Bruce's work is held at: MoCP Chicago, University of St Andrews Photography Collection, National Galleries of Scotland, Robert Mapplethorpe Photography Collection, Royal Scottish Academy, Edinburgh Napier University Photography Collection, Ffotogallery, Dovecot Studios, Zero Tolerance, and various private collections.

== Publications ==
- Menie: Trumped. Daylight books, 2023.
