= Alicia García-Salcedo González =

Asturian Catholic lawyer

Alicia García-Salcedo González (1903, Uviéu - 2003, Llanes), was an Asturian Catholic lawyer known for becoming in 1935 the first lawyer of Asturies.
