= Leisha =

Leisha /ˈliːʃə/ is a feminine given name of Old Germanic origin, a variant of Alice via Alicia. It may also be linked with the name of the male prophet Elisha in the Old Testament. The meaning of Leisha is noble or exalted. Leisha is a relatively uncommon name, the highest position it has reached in the United States being 1235th in the 1960s.

== Notable people ==
- Leisha Hailey (born 1971), American actress and musician
- Leisha Harvey (born 1947), Australian politician
