= Alicia Creus =

Argentine artist (born 1939)

- Born: 1939 (age 86–87); La Plata, Argentina
- Education: Escuela Nacional Normal de San Fernando, Argentina
- Known for: Fabric artwork

Alicia Creus (born 1939) is an Argentine artist who currently resides in the United States. She is known for using unusual media such as fabric and lace to create her pieces.

== Biography ==
Alicia Creus was born in 1939 in La Plata, Argentina. She grew up writing poetry and sculpting. This would have a huge effect on the rest of her work. Many of her pieces were based on poetry, or included verses in the art. In 1976, the president of Argentina was overthrown during a right-wing military coup. In the ensuing years, thousands of people would be "disappeared" by the government. To flee the unrest, Creus left the country and moved to New York City. She studied art at multiple schools in New York, before becoming a professor of painting at the University of North Carolina, Greensboro in 1991.

== Education ==
While in Argentina, Creus attended the Escuela Nacional Normal de San Fernando and the Universidad de Buenos Aires. After moving to New York, she studied painting at the New York Studio School in Greenwich and The Art Student's League in New York.

== Artwork ==
At first, Creus focused her efforts into poetry and writing. After she moved to New York in the late 70s, she became interested in the study of color and began painting organic subjects like flowers and fruits. The New York Times likened her pieces in the "Beyond the Surface" exhibition to paintings done by Matisse in Morocco and Nice. In the 1990s, she changed her style again and began using fabric to create her paintings. Many records of her work are of these fabric and textile pieces. She frequently implements poetry and verses from other poets in her pieces.

=== The Velázquez Series ===
The Velázquez Series is a collection of two of Creus' works, where she aimed to recreate parts of the influential 17th century painting "Las Meninas" by Diego Velázquez. She focuses on two figures central to Velázquez's original painting: the Infanta princess and the Dwarf Maribárbola.

In the first work, "The Desires of Maribárbola", Creus uses embroidery, fabric, and lace to recreate the image of the old court dwarf. In the background of the piece, embroidered a quote from Argentine poet Alfonsina Storni as a message from the dwarf to Diego Velázquez: "Espíritu divino, que de mi nada sabes... No podrias tomarme en tus manos suaves, y decirme en voz baja, desdichada críature?" Translated to English, the quote says "Divine spirit who knows nothing about me... Couldn’t you hold me in your soft hands, and whisper to me, unfortunate creature?"

The second work, "The Princess and her Keeper", she uses similar materials including linen, artificial flowers, and other fabrics to create the image of the Princess. In the original painting, the princess was the then 5-year-old Margeret Theresa, daughter of King Philip IV of Spain. In Creus' rendition, the princess symbolizes the "wishes of all girls to become princesses". She embroidered a verse from Nicaraguan poet Rubén Darío: "The princess is sad, what ails the princess. Sighs escape from her strawberry mouth."

=== The Dark Series ===
The alternate title of Creus' "Dark Series" is "a Oscuridad es otro Sol", or "Darkness is another Sun". This was based on the title of a series of stories by Olga Orozco, an Argentinean poet. This series of artworks are entirely black and white. Creus used handmade black paper and created figures using white crayon and layers of fabrics. Creus combined multiple pieces of paper asymmetrically to form a whole image from its component parts. Many images in the series feature "nomads", small hooded spirits that are present all throughout reality but rarely choose to show their presence.

=== Buenos Aires Suite ===
Creus' Buenos Aires series also feature the black hooded spirits known as "nomads". In this series, the nomads are shown in various photographs Creus took of parks in Buenos Aires. She uses a verse from Italian poet Giuseppe Unagaretti to describe the series: "Far far/like a blind man/they have taken me by the hand". These nomads are a recurring theme in Creus' work, including many of her drawings, prints, poems, and books.

== Exhibitions and collections ==
=== Exhibitions ===
Creus has had her works featured in many exhibitions since 1983. In particular, the city of Greensboro displayed many of her works alongside other UNCG faculty members in their yearly exhibitions.

- 1990 – "Beyond the Surface" @ Americas Society, New York
- 1996 – Weatherspoon Art Gallery
- 1997 – Weatherspoon Art Gallery
- 1997 – "The Veiled Mirrors" @ El Museo del Barrio, New York
- 2007 – UNCG Department of Art Faculty Biennial

=== Collections ===
Creus' work is held in many locations, including museums, archives and personal collections.

- Bronx Museum of Art, New York City
- Duke University Museum of Art, Durham, North Carolina
- Museum of Modern Art, New York
