= Alicia Bertone =

American academic, veterinary surgeon

Alicia L. Bertone
- Born: September 3, 1956 (age 70); New York, US
- Occupations: Academic administrator, researcher, and veterinary surgeon
- Title: ENGIE-Axium Endowed Dean’s Chair

Academic background
- Education: B.S., Life Sciences; D.V.M Veterinary Medicine; M.S., Pathology; Ph.D., Biomedical Sciences
- Alma mater: Cornell University; Colorado State University

Alicia L. Bertone is an American academic, administrator, researcher, and veterinary surgeon. She is a professor and a provost in the Office of Academic Affairs at the Ohio State University. Bertone has worked as the Vice-Provost of Graduate Studies, Associate Vice Provost of Data and Analysis, the ENGIE-Axium Endowed Dean of the Graduate School, and the Trueman Family Endowed Chair at the Ohio State University. Bertone is a Professor of Veterinary Clinical Sciences, and, as the Trueman Endowed Chair, established and directed the Comparative Orthopedic Research Laboratory at the University.

Bertone has published over 400 research papers, proceedings, and abstracts in the fields of biomedical science including gene therapy for the treatment of cartilage injury and bone repair. Specifically, her research has focused on the progressive translation of basic science in molecular engineering, cell therapy, ortho-biologic therapies, as well as preclinical and clinical animal models of pharmaceuticals and biologics. She designed and patented the first commercial equine microarray.

Bertone is board-certified in equine surgery and equine sports medicine and rehabilitation and is a member of university research initiatives such as the Consortium for the Advancement of Neuromusculoskeletal Science and Locomotion and the Center for Clinical and Translational Science.

== Education ==
Bertone started her initial education in the Fine Arts at the School of American Ballet in New York and later transitioned to the sciences. She studied at Cornell University and received her B.S. degree in Life Sciences with Honors and her D.V.M degree in 1977 and 1982, respectively. She was then enrolled at Colorado State University where she completed her M.S. degree in Pathology in 1986, and her Ph.D. degree in Biomedical Sciences the following year. In 2001, Bertone completed an NIH Fellowship at Harvard in Gene Therapy from the Center for Molecular Orthopaedics.

== Career ==
Following her doctoral studies, Bertone was an Assistant Professor and Director of the Equine Research Laboratory at Louisiana State University as an Assistant Professor of Clinical Sciences before joining Ohio State University in 1989. She reached full Professor in 1997 and was appointed to the Trueman Family Endowed Chair for two consecutive terms in translation and interdisciplinary research. Bertone has also been appointed as an adjunct professor within the University's Department of Orthopedics in the College of Medicine for over 25 years.

Bertone has also held several administrative appointments. From 2007 till 2013, she directed industry research at OSU Sports Medicine Center, and was appointed as Chair of the Post-professional Education Committee in 2011. Bertone was elected to the President's & Provost's Leadership Institute in 2017. She also served as an Orthopedic Surgeon at Galbreath Equine Center from 1990 till 2018. In 2022, Bertone was appointed at the University of North Carolina at Charlotte as provost and vice chancellor for academic affairs and served from January 3rd, 2023 before stepping down in May 2023.

== Research ==
Bertone's Google Scholar index reports an h-index of 49 with over 6300 citations. Bertone has collaborated with industry partners on novel therapies, both pharmaceutical and biotherapeutics.

=== Joint disease ===
Bertone studied the response of the joint after a repetitive injury and the rest period along with the physiological processes involved in the repairing of the damage. She highlighted the changes and complex interactions within the joint during the inflammatory process, and the available therapeutic modalities. She conducted study to evaluate various synovial fluid cytokines and eicosanoids for the diagnosis of joint disease and categories of joint disease. She found interleukin-6 to be an efficient screening test for the presence of joint disease when lameness is difficult to identify. Bertone conducted randomized controlled clinical trials to compare efficacy of firocoxib and phenylbutazone paste formulations in horses with osteoarthritis, and found comparable efficacies of both drugs. She published a paper in early 2010s regarding the reduction in interleukin-1β (IL-1β) signaling by RNA interference-based transcript reduction and receptor blockade method, and the quantification of changes incurred on transcript expression of additional mediators. She provided evidence for the in vivo role of IL-1β in spontaneous osteoarthritis.

=== Gene and stem cell therapy for bone repair and cartilage injury ===
Bertone studied the healing of rabbit bilateral ulnar osteotomies after surgery, in response to percutaneous injection of transgenic adenoviral (Ad) bone morphogenetic protein-6 (BMP-6) vector. She found BMP-6 to be osteo-inductive in vivo resulting in acceleration of bone repair. She conducted a study to investigate the feasibility of osteogenic differentiation of bone marrow–derived mesenchymal stem cells using two BMP genes and 3D alginate culture systems. Her research indicated that transduction of BMDMSC with bone morphogenetic proteins-2 or -6 can accelerate osteogenic differentiation and mineralization of stem cells in culture. She also achieved the repair of articular fractures in vivo using direct stem cell injection transduced with BMP-2, however, the treatment was found to be insufficient to provide long-term quality osteochondral repair.

In late 2000s, Bertone published a paper regarding a study on Standardbred racehorses having moderate to severe midbody suspensory ligament desmitis (MSD). She found positive results regarding treatment by intralesional injection of a single dose of platelet-rich plasma, followed by gradual increase in exercise.

In August 2026, Bertone published a paper detailing a clinical trial involving the use of injecting Equicenta® CTM to improve lameness in performance horses.

== Awards and honors ==
- 2000 – National Gamma Award in recognition of distinguished service to the veterinary profession
- 2004 – Distinguished Alumni Speaker, Cornell University Centennial Conference
- 2004 – Pfizer Research Award, College of Veterinary Medicine, The Ohio State University
- 2014 – Charles C. Capen Teaching Excellence Award for Graduate Education, OSUCVM
- 2017 – President's and Provost's Advisory Council on Women, The Ohio State University
- 2025 – University of Ohio Proteometrics Best Researcher Award

== Bibliography ==
- Palmer, Jan L.; Bertone, Alicia L. (July 1994). "Joint structure, biochemistry and biochemical disequilibrium in synovitis and equine joint disease". Equine Veterinary Journal. 26 (4): 263–277. doi:10.1111/j.2042-3306.1994.tb04386.x. PMID 8575393.
- Bertone, A. L.; Palmer, J. L.; Jones, J. (December 2001). "Synovial fluid cytokines and eicosanoids as markers of joint disease in horses". Veterinary Surgery. 30 (6): 528–538. doi:10.1053/jvet.2001.28430. PMID 11704948.
- Waselau, Martin; Sutter, W. Wesley; Genovese, Ronald L.; Bertone, Alicia L. (15 May 2008). "Intralesional injection of platelet-rich plasma followed by controlled exercise for treatment of midbody suspensory ligament desmitis in Standardbred racehorses". Journal of the American Veterinary Medical Association. 232 (10): 1515–1520. doi:10.2460/javma.232.10.1515. PMID 18479242.
- Santangelo, K.S.; Nuovo, G.J.; Bertone, A.L. (December 2012). "In vivo reduction or blockade of interleukin-1β in primary osteoarthritis influences expression of mediators implicated in pathogenesis". Osteoarthritis and Cartilage. 20 (12): 1610–1618. doi:10.1016/j.joca.2012.08.011. PMC 3478416. PMID 22935786.
