= Kersten Reich =

German educator

Kersten Reich (born August 14, 1948, in Hamburg) is a German educator and cultural theorist. He was Professor of General Pedagogy from 1979 to 2006 and Professor of International Learning Research at the University of Cologne from 2007 to 2017.

== Career ==
Reich studied art and political science with a state examination for teaching as well as main studies in psychology, education, and philosophy. He achieved his PhD at TU Berlin in 1976. His dissertation Theories of Teaching discussed German concepts of teaching. He completed his habilitation in 1978 with a thesis on Philosophy of Education and Knowledge Theories. He occupied his first full professorship in 1979.

=== Research work ===
Kersten Reich became known in pedagogy with his dissertation Theories of Teaching in the 1970s. In a comparison of the prevailing instructional schools in Germany, he criticized in particular the insufficient orientation towards a comprehensive understanding of the psychology of learning. In his habilitation thesis, a turn toward Erlangen constructivism is evident. In the 1990s, he founded interactionist constructivism. This approach is understood as a socioculturally oriented constructivism, which in particular is connected with John Dewey's pragmatism. Reich also founded the Cologne Dewey Center in direct cooperation with the American Dewey Center. Together with Jim Garrison and Stefan Neubert, he has published two fundamental works on "John Dewey's Philosophy of Education" and on "Democracy and Education reconsidered".

In 1998 Reich's main work on interactionist constructivism "Die Ordnung der Blicke" was published in two volumes. In an engagement with currents of recent epistemological criticism, he argues why constructivists should not only rely on observer theories, but must always consider the role of participants and agents in their interactive context.

The 2012 work "Inklusion und Bildungsgerechtigkeit" and 2013's "Chancengerechtigkeit und Kapitalformen," which also appeared in English in 2018, comprehensively address educational disadvantages in both the German and international education and teacher training systems. Reich expands Bourdieu's theory of forms of capital by elaborating the added value of forms of capital like "body capital" and "learning capital."

He has published more than 120 essays, including e.g., articles in English on the relationship between constructivism and pragmatism, on interactionist constructivism and education, on the roles of observers, participants, and agents in discources, on questions of language construction, on the social as an inclusive idea, on the connection between Berger & Luckmann (social constructivism) with Dewey's constructivist pragmatism, on Zygmunt Bauman with Stefan Neubert.

== See also ==
- Learning Research and Development Center

== Works ==
- Paul Heimann : Didactics as a teaching science. Edited and introduced by Kersten Reich and Helga Thomas. Klett, Stuttgart 1976.
- Theories of General Didactics. On the basic lines of didactic scientific development in the Federal Republic of Germany and in the German Democratic Republic. Klett, Stuttgart 1977 (dissertation, TU Berlin, 1976).
- Education and Knowledge. Studies on the Methodology of Educational Science. Klett-Cotta, Stuttgart 1978 (habilitation thesis, TU Berlin).
- Teaching, condition analysis and decision making. Approaches to the new foundation of the Berlin School of Didactics. Klett-Cotta, Stuttgart 1979.
- Houses of Reason. My Conversations with Philosophical Thinkers of the West. Lang, Bern 1988.
- Systemic-Constructivist Pedagogy. Luchterhand, Neuwied 1996; 6th edition: Beltz, Weinheim 2010. ISBN 978-3-407-25535-8
- with Yuqing Wei: Relationships as a Way of Life. Philosophy and Education in Ancient China. Waxmann, Münster 1997.
- The order of the Observing. 2 volumes. Luchterhand / Beltz, Neuwied et al. 1998. Online
- Hickman, Larry A.; Neubert, Stefan; Reich, Kersten (2013). John Dewey between pragmatism and constructivism. New York: Fordham University Press. ISBN 978-0-8232-5182-7. OCLC 820531089.
- Constructivist didactics. Luchterhand, Neuwied 2012; 5th edition: Beltz, Weinheim 2012. ISBN 978-3-407-25689-8
- Inclusion and equity in education. Beltz, Weinheim 2012. ISBN 978-3-407-25681-2
- with Judith M. Green, Stefan Neubert: Pragmaitism and Diversity. Dewey in the Context of Late Twentieth Century Debates. New York: Palgrave Macmillan 2012, ISBN 9781137010605
- with Jim Garrison/Stefan Neubert/Kersten Reich: John Dewey’s Philosophy of Education - An Introduction and Recontextualization for Our Times. New York (Palgrave Macmillan) 2012, ISBN 978-1-137-02617-0
- Equal opportunities and forms of capital. Springer VS, Wiesbaden 2013. In English: Surplus Values – A New Theory of Forms of Capital and Social Justice in Our Times.
- Inclusive Teaching. How to Form an Inclusive School. Beltz, Weinheim 2014, ISBN 978-3-407-25710-9
- An Inclusive School for Everyone. The Model of the Inclusive University School of Cologne. Beltz, Weinheim / Basel 2015, ISBN 978-3-407-25725-3
- Garrison, James W.; Neubert, Stefan; Reich, Kersten (2016). Democracy and education reconsidered : Dewey after one hundred years. London. ISBN 978-1-317-38053-5. OCLC 945764861.
- Der entgrenzte Mensch und die Grenzen der Erde. Vol 1: Wie Erziehung und Verhalten die Nachhaltigkeit erschweren. Frankfurt a.M.: Westend, ISBN 978-3-86489-318-6 18-6
- Der entgrenzte Mensch und die Grenzen der Erde. Vol 2: Wie Ökonomie und Politik die Nachhaltigkeit verhindern. Frankfurt a.M.: Westend, ISBN 978-3-86489-319-3
- Das Nachhaltige Manifest - Lasst uns den Planeten retten! Frankfurt a.M.: Westend 2021, ISBN 978-3-86489-332-2
- The Sustainable Manifesto - A Commitment to Individual, Economical, and Political Change. London & New York: Routledge 2022 in print
