= Alicia Beatriz Casullo =

Argentine psychoanalyst (1940–2019)

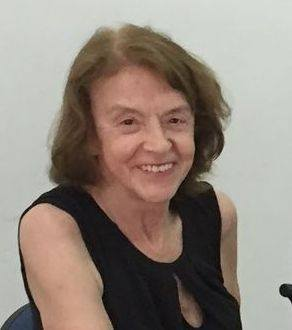
Alicia Beatriz Casullo

Alicia Beatriz Casullo (September 15, 1940 – April 15, 2019) was an Argentine psychoanalyst. She served as president of International Psychoanalytical Studies Organization (IPSO), and was a founding member and head of the Sociedad Argentina de Psicoanálisis ("Argentine Society of Psychoanalysis") (SAP). She was also a member of the Federación Psicoanalítica de América Latina ("Latin American Psychoanalytic Federation"; FEPAL), and the International Psychoanalytical Association (IPA).

== Biography ==
Alicia Beatriz Casullo was born in Buenos Aires, September 15, 1940. She studied at the University of Buenos Aires, receiving degrees in education sciences (1963) and in psychology (1970) before doing postgraduate studies in clinical psychology (1972-1976) at the University of Belgrano.

Casullo served as the head of the Department of Educational Psychology in the Career of Educational Sciences at the Faculty of Philosophy and Letters, University of Buenos Aires. She was the author of the book Psicoanálisis y Educación ("Psychoanalysis and Education").

She was a founding member of the Argentine Society of Psychoanalysis where she held various positions, including Secretary of the Training Institute, Seminar Teacher, and Coordinator of the Publications and Library Area, as well as the director and editor of the society's magazine. She also served as president of International Psychoanalytical Studies Organization (IPSO), from 1991 to 1993, having been elected during the 11th IPSO Congress held at Psychoanalytic Association of Buenos Aires (APdeBA). She was a tireless traveler who participated in numerous congresses in the country and abroad.

Casullo died in Buenos Aires, April 15, 2019.

== Selected works ==
=== Books ===
- Psicoanálisis y Educación, Editorial Santillana

=== Articles ===
- "La paradoja del sufrimiento" Casullo, Alicia Beatriz; Tabacznik, Marcos A. Psicoanálisis; 35(2): 223-247, sep. 2013.
- "Conversamos con Rafael Paz", Casullo, Alicia Beatriz. Revista de la Sociedad Argentina de Psicoanálisis; 11/12: 315-326, 2008.
- "Conversamos con Eduardo Issaharoff"; Casullo, Alicia. Revista de la Sociedad Argentina de Psicoanálisis; 11/12: 327-344, 2008.
- " Recordatorio Juan Antonio Cabanne"; Casullo, Alicia. Psicoanálisis, Buenos Aires; 27(3): 385-389, 2005. Artículo en Español | Bivipsil | ID: psa-84951
- "Jornadas del IPSO: un cambio real"; Casullo, Alicia Beatriz. Moción: Revista del Claustro de Candidatos; 3(6): 13–16, 1990.
- "Resumo: La interpretación en el análisis de familia" Caso de Leverato, Beatriz; Casullo, Alicia; Fermepin de Pisani, Eloisa. Psicoanálisis, Buenos Aires; 9(2): 210, 1987.
- "Pertenencia e Identidad: dialéctica de un cambio": Casullo, Alicia Beatriz; Gutman de Kaufman, Juana; López de Illa, Olga Leonor; Tabacznik, Marcos A.
- Moción: Revista del Claustro de Candidatos; 4(7): 26–31, 1991. Artículo en Español | Bivipsil | ID: psa-71838
- "Supervisión psicoanalítica: enfoque clínico o reflexiones clínicas compartidas": Casullo, Alicia; Resnizky, Silvia. Revista de Psicoanálisis, Buenos Aires, Buenos Aires; 50(4/5): 1043–1052, 1993.
- "Psicología y educación: Encuentros y desencuentros en la situación educativa"; Casullo, Alicia Beatriz. Buenos Aires; Santillana; ene. 2003. 652 p.
- Monografía en Español | Bivipsil | ID: psa-133916
