= Alicia Boler Davis =

American engineer and businesswoman

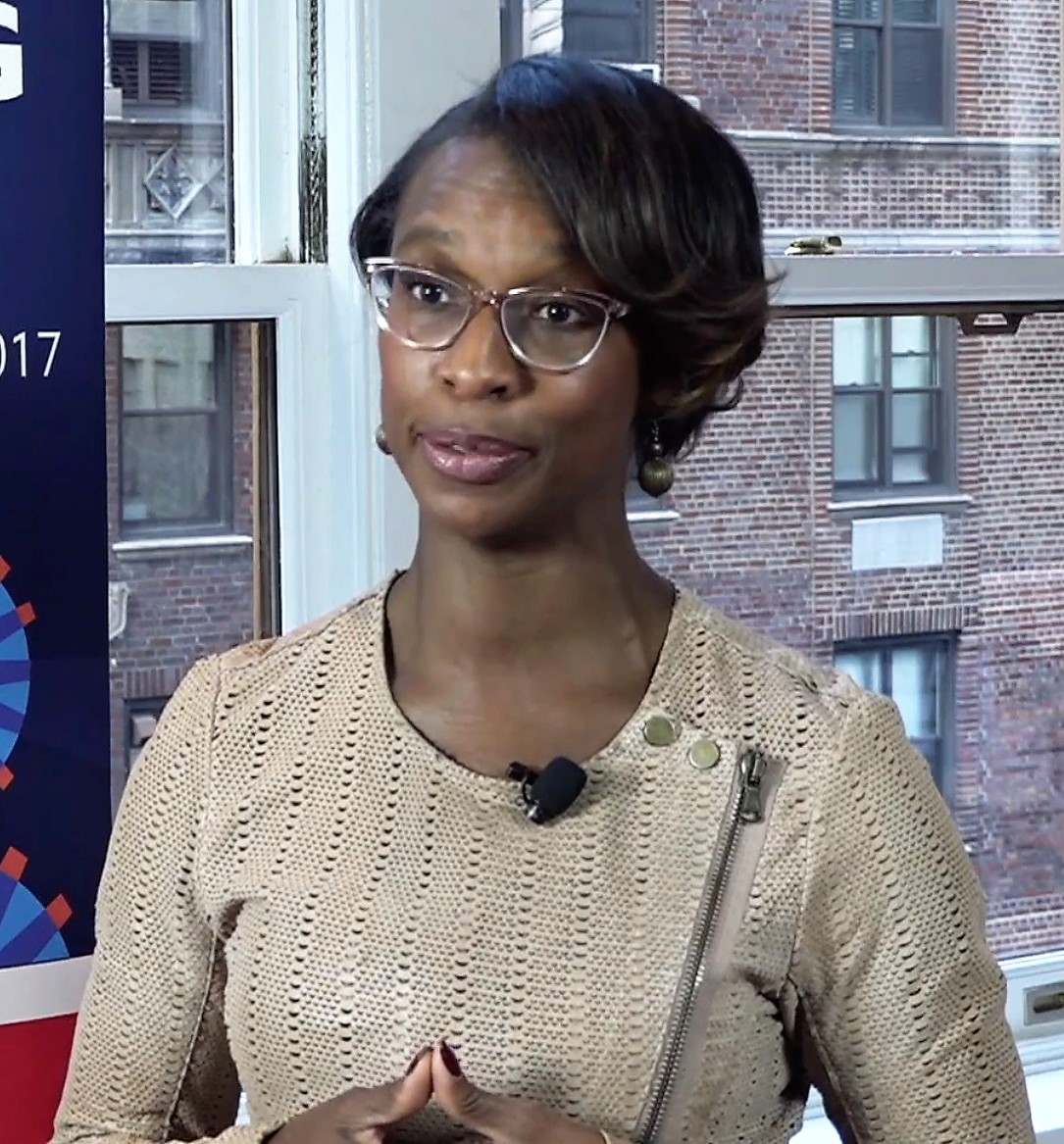
- Alicia Boler Davis speaks for Brightline Project Management Institute in 2017
- Education: Rensselaer Polytechnic Institute; Northwestern University; Kelley School of Business
- Occupation: CEO
- Employer: Alto Pharmacy
- Known for: Operations and Engineering

Alicia Boler Davis is an American engineer and businesswoman. Boler Davis began her career at General Motors, rising to the rank of executive vice president of global manufacturing in 2016. In 2019, she joined Amazon as senior vice president of global customer fulfillment. During her time at Amazon, she led much of the company's response to the COVID-19 pandemic and became the first Black executive to join its senior leadership (known internally as the S-team).

In late June 2022, Davis announced she would become the new CEO of Alto Pharmacy, a digital pharmacy startup with about $1 billion in revenue and 1,200 employees, starting in September 2022.

== Early life and education ==
Boler Davis spent her childhood fixing broken items in her home, where she grew up with her mother Denise and 3 siblings. She attended a high school program at the General Motors Institute and she decided she wanted to work there. She completed her bachelor's degree in chemical engineering at Northwestern University. She was the first generation of her family to attend college, following her sister Kimberly Boler who studied at Harvard University and became an attorney. She followed this with a master's degree in engineering science at Rensselaer Polytechnic Institute. She received a Master of Business Administration from Kelley School of Business at Indiana University Bloomington.

== Career ==
In 1994 Boler Davis joined General Motors as a manufacturing engineer. She was plant manager at the Michigan Orion Assembly facility. She was the first black woman to become a plant manager. She simultaneously led the plant at Pontiac Stamping.

She was appointed Vice President of Customer Experience at General Motors in 2012. She was promoted to Senior Vice President for Global Customer Experience in 2013. She was part of the Forbes Most Powerful Women Next Gen Summit in 2014. That year she spoke at the University of California, Berkeley Haas School of Business. She was promoted to Executive Vice President of global manufacturing in 2016 and leads 180,000 employees. Since 2016 she has served on the board of directors at General Mills. She joined the board of Beaumont Health in 2017.

In 2018 Boler Davis became the sixth woman to be named Black Engineer of the Year. She has championed and mentored women in the automotive industry, and serves as the Executive Liaison for the GM WOMEN leadership board.

On April 1, 2019, Boler Davis Joined Amazon as VP of Global Customer Fulfillment and was subsequently promoted to SVP of Global Customer Fulfillment. Her role included leading fulfillment, customer service, and robotics globally. She quickly became one of Amazon's most high-profile executives, especially in leading much of the response to the COVID-19 pandemic, including doubling the fulfillment network, overhauling more than 150 warehouses, and hiring 275,000 people.

In June 2022, Boler Davis was named CEO of Alto Pharmacy, a digital pharmacy startup with about $1 billion in revenue and 1,200 employees. Boler Davis turned down offers to run Fortune 500 companies to lead the digital telehealth startup seeking to improve prescription delivery access.

== Boards ==
2016 - 2019 General Mills

2017 - 2019 Beaumont Health

2023 - pres. JPMorgan Chase & Co.

== Awards and honors ==
2021: Fortune Most Powerful Women, #17

2020: Fortune Most Powerful Women, #12

2018: US Black Engineer Magazine - Black Engineer of the Year

2018: Business Insider - Most Powerful Female Engineers in the World

2017: Automotive News - All Star in Manufacturing

2016: Trumpet Awards - Corporate Executive of the Year

2014: Women of Color Magazine - Technologist of the Year

2013: Fortune - Top 10 most powerful women in the automotive industry

2011: Michigan Chronicle - Woman of Excellence

2010: Automotive News - 100 Leading Women in the North American Automotive Industry
