= Alicia Parlette =

American journalist and copy editor

- Born: January 11, 1982
- Died: April 22, 2010 (aged 28); San Francisco, California, U.S.
- Cause of death: Alveolar soft part sarcoma
- Occupations: Journalist; copy editor

Alicia Rose Parlette (January 11, 1982 – April 22, 2010) was an American journalist and copy editor who was diagnosed with alveolar soft part sarcoma in 2005 while employed by the San Francisco Chronicle newspaper.

At the age of 16, Parlette began experiencing pain in the area of her right hip that forced her to drop out of cross country running. An MRI scan revealed a spot that was interpreted as a hemangioma. Six years later, after she developed a severe cough, further scans showed spots in her lungs. Half a year later, she developed a lump in her right breast, which was excised and biopsied, leading to the correct diagnosis of the cancer she had probably been carrying for at least seven years.

After learning of being afflicted with this rare form of cancer, Parlette began a diary of her treatment titled "Alicia's Story", the first installment of which was carried by the San Francisco Chronicle on June 5, 2005. The series won Parlette the Laxalt Distinguished Writer Award in 2005. The first seven installments of the series were published as a book of the same name in 2005.

On March 9, 2007, the San Francisco Chronicle published the final installment of "Alicia's Story" under the title "Cancer. Despair. And now, a blog." In this installment, Parlette explained that she no longer would remain a "full-fledged employee of Hearst Newspapers" and instead would be continuing to share her story as a public blog on the Chronicle's website. On August 17, 2007, Parlette posted her last entry on the website.

== Appearances and health updates ==
On November 13, 2008, Parlette attended a book reading by Kelly Corrigan and was reported by another cancer survivor as doing well, "she looks healthy and vibrant".

== Decline in health ==
In early April 2010, Parlette's health took a turn for the worse. Her friends set up a site to gather donations and give updates on her health.

On April 13, 2010, a post on the page described Parlette's current condition:

"...her lung tumors have grown to the point where she needs to be on oxygen full time to function...Even with the oxygen, she is struggling to breathe. In addition, Alicia has a fracture in her right hip, the side where her large tumor is. Consequently, she is in bed 24/7. Neither the breathing nor the hip problems are fixable or reversible. Her oncologist has recommended no further treatment."

"Parlette is conscious, eating and drinking, chatting with visiting friends, snuggling with her dog Clarabelle, and napping. Her pain is well-managed and she is comfortable, considering the circumstances."

"To be perfectly blunt, it's hard to say how much time she has left. Her doctor explained that her health problems are compounded further each day."

== Death ==
On April 22, 2010, Parlette died at the University of California, San Francisco Medical Center, at the age of 28. During her final days, her friends read her favorite book, To Kill a Mockingbird, aloud to her; she died twenty minutes after the last chapter was finished.

== Public memorial ==
A public memorial was held for Parlette at Lafayette Park in San Francisco on the evening of May 10, 2010. During the reading of an excerpt from To Kill a Mockingbird, there was a break in the rainy weather, with the skies opening and the sighting of a rainbow to the east over downtown San Francisco.
