= Alyosha =

Alyosha (Russian: Алёша), also transliterated as Aliosha, Aliocha, etc., is an affectionate diminutive (hypocorism) of the name Alexey. It may refer to:

== People ==
- Aliocha (born Aliocha Allard; 1984), French film director
- Aliocha Itovich, French actor, director, screenwriter and producer
- Aliocha Schneider (born 1993), Canadian actor
- Aliocha Wald Lasowski (born 1979), French journalist, essayist and university professor
- Aljoscha Kemlein (born 2004), German football player
- Alyosha (singer) (born 1986), Ukrainian pop singer
- Alyosha Abrahamyan (1945–2018), Armenian football player
- Alyosha Andonov (born 1961), Bulgarian football coach
- Alyosha Dimitrievich (1913–1986), Russian gypsy singer
- Alyosha Dzhaparidze (1880–1918), Georgian Bolshevik
- Alyosha Efros, American computer scientist
- Alyosha Svanidze (1886–1941), Georgian Bolshevik

== Fictional characters ==
- Alyosha Karamazov, protagonist of Dostoyevsky's The Brothers Karamazov
- Alyosha Kravinoff, real name of comic book villain Kraven the Hunter II
- Alyosha Popovich, Russian folk hero
- Alyosha Skvortsov, protagonist of the 1959 film Ballad of a Soldier
- Alyosha the Pot, protagonist of Tolstoy's short story of the same name
- Alyosha, a character in Genshin Impact

== Monuments ==
- Alyosha Monument, Murmansk, Russia World War II monument
- Alyosha Monument, Plovdiv, Bulgarian World War II monument
  - "Alyosha" (song), a 1966 song inspired by the Plovdiv monument
- Bronze Soldier of Tallinn, Estonian World War II monument sometimes called Alyosha

== Other ==
- Alyosha, a song by Norwegian singer Susanne Sundfør on her 2023 album Blómi

== See also ==
- Ivan & Alyosha, an American indie rock band
- Aljoša
