= Alicia Kersten =

German footballer

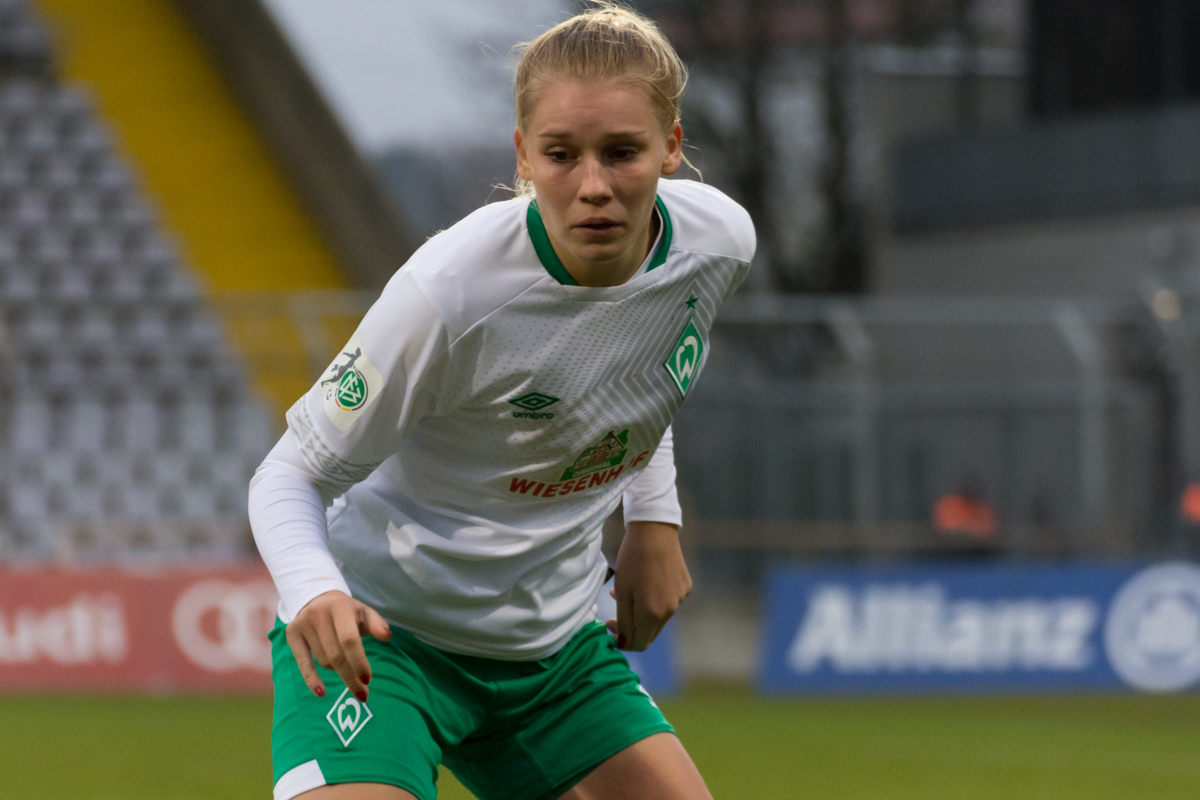
- Kersten with Werder Bremen

Personal information
- Date of birth: 22 July 1998 (age 28)
- Place of birth: Cuxhaven, Germany
- Height: 1.70 m (5 ft 7 in)
- Position: Midfielder

Youth career
- –2015: Werder Bremen

Senior career*
Years	Team	Apps	(Gls)
2015–2020	Werder Bremen	41	(1)
2019–2020	Werder Bremen II		
- * Club domestic league appearances and goals

Alicia Kersten (born 22 July 1998) is a German footballer who played as a midfielder for Werder Bremen.
