= List of minelayer ship classes =

This is a list of minelayer ship classes by country

== Australia ==
- HMAS Bungaree −1 ship in service 1941 to 1946

== China ==
- Wolei-class minelayer – 1 ship in service from 1988

== Denmark ==
- Falster-class minelayer – 4 ships (in Danish) all scrapped
- Lindormen-class minelayer – 2 ships (sold to Estonia)

== Finland ==
- Finnish minelayer Louhi 1 ship in service 1918 to 1945
- Finnish minelayer Keihässalmi 1 ship in service from 1957 to 1994
- Hämeenmaa-class minelayer 2 ships in service from 1992
- Pansio-class minelayer 3 ships in service from 1991
- Finnish minelayer Pohjanmaa 1 ship in service from 1979 to 2013
- Pukkio-class minelayer 3 ships in service from 1947 to 1991
- Ruotsinsalmi-class minelayer 2 ships in service 1940 to 1975
- Teplokhod-class motor minelayer 8 ships 1914 to 1952? ( 3? also used by the Estonian Navy)

== France ==
- French cruiser Pluton 1 ship in service 1929 to 1939
- Pluton-class minelayer (1912) 2 ships in service 1914 to 1921

== Germany ==
=== Imperial German Navy ===
- Brummer-class cruiser – 2 ships
- Nautilus-class minelayer – 2 ships
- SMS Deutschland (1914) – 1 ship
- SS Königin Luise (1913) – 1 ship

=== Kriegsmarine ===
- German training ship Bremse – 1 ship
- German training ship Brummer – 1 ship
- Drache – 1 ship (ex Yugoslav)
- Brummer (ii) – 1 ship (ex Norwegian)

== Iran ==
- Iran Ajr – 1 ship

== Italy ==
=== Regia Marina ===
- Italian minelayer Fasana – 1 ship
- Azio-class minelayer – 6 ships

== Japan ==
=== Imperial Japanese Navy ===
- Hatsutaka-class minelayer – 3 ships
- Japanese minelayer Itsukushima – 1 ship
- Japanese minelayer Kamishima – 1 ship
- Japanese minelayer Minoo – 1 ship
- Natsushima-class minelayer (1933) – 3 ships
- Japanese minelayer Okinoshima – 1 ship
- Japanese minelayer Shirataka
- Sokuten-class auxiliary minelayer (1913) – 13 ships
- MV Tenyo Maru (1935) – 1 ship
- Japanese minelayer Tsugaru – 1 ship
- Japanese minelayer Yaeyama – 1 ship

== Korea (ROK) ==
- Nampo-class minelayer

== Netherlands ==
- Douwe Aukes-class minelayer – 2 ships
- Hydra-class minelayer – 2 ships
- Prins van Oranje-class minelayers – 2 ships

== Norway ==
- HNoMS Frøya – 1 ship
- Vale-class gunboat – 5 ships (4 captured by Germany)
- Glommen-class minelayer – 2 ships (1 captured by Germany)
- HNoMS Olav Tryggvason – 1 ship (captured by Germany)
- Gor-class Former US Navy Auk-class.
  - «Brage» ex. USS «Triumph» (1961–1991)
  - «Gor»
  - «Uller»
  - «Tyr»
- Vidar-class Two ships built in Norway.
  - HNoMS Vidar (1977–2006) Sold to Latvia in 2006.
  - HNoMS Vale (1978–2003) Donated to Latvia in 2003.

== Poland ==
- ORP Gryf (1936) – 1 ship

== Romania ==
- NMS Aurora – 1 ship
- NMS Alexandru cel Bun – 1 ship
- NMS Amiral Murgescu – 2 ships
- NMS Regele Carol I – 1 ship
- OMm35-class minelayer – 2 ships (ex Czech)

== Russia (Soviet Union) ==
=== Imperial Russian Navy ===
- Amur-class minelayer (1898)

=== Soviet Navy ===
- Alesha-class minelayer – 3 ships
- Marti −1 ship (former imperial yacht)

== Spain ==
- Júpiter-class minelayer – 4 ships

== Sweden ==
- HSwMS Älvsborg – 1 ship (sold to Chile)
- HSwMS Älvsnabben (M01) – 1 ship
- HSwMS Carlskrona (P04) – 1 ship
- HSwMS Visborg – 1 ship

== Taiwan ==
- Min Jiang-class minelayer – 4 ships

== Turkey ==
- Ottoman minelayer Nusret – 1 ship

== United Kingdom ==
- HMS Abdiel (1915)
- HMS Adventure (M23) 1 ship in service 1922 to 1944
- Abdiel-class minelayer – 6 ships in service 1941 to 1972
- Linnet-class minelayer – 3 ships in service 1938 to 1964
- HMS Plover (M26) – 1 ship in service 1927 to 1969
- HMS Agamemnon (M10)
- HMS Abdiel (N21) – 1967 to 1988

== Yugoslavia ==
- Silba-class landing ship-minelayer −3 ships (subsequently to Croatia)

== Bibliography ==
- Jentschura, Hansgeorg; Jung, Dieter & Mickel, Peter (1977). Warships of the Imperial Japanese Navy, 1869–1945. Annapolis, Maryland: United States Naval Institute. ISBN 978-0-87021-893-4.
