= List of mine warfare vessels of the Ottoman steam navy =

This is a list of mine warfare vessels of the Ottoman Steam Navy:

== Mine depot ship (Mayın depo gemisi) ==
=== Giresun ===
Name (Namesake)	Builder Dimensions Displacement, Hull Speed Complement	Machinery Boiler, Bunkers Engines Armament	Ordered Laid down Launched Trials	Commissioned Decommissioned Afterward
Giresun (Giresun)	Robert Napier and Sons, Glasgow Yd No 362; L 106.3m, B 11.3m, D 8.7m 4663tdw, 3065gt, Iron; 10kts (1910), 7kts (1916); 90 (1914)	Steam 1 shaft 2,- 1 triple expansion 3 cyl., vertical, 2400ihp, Fairfield Co. 1x88 L/45 QF K (1910), disarmed (1917)	1877; 1877; 1877; Oct. 1877	Oct. 1877 as Warwick Castle D Currie & Co., London; 1896 Warwick Castle Union Castle Line, London; 1897 Jerome, Booth S.S.Co., London; 1910 sold to the Ottoman government 1910 commissioned as mine transport Giresun; 1916 collier 1917 laid up at Constantinople; 15 May 1919 released by the French government and transferred to Osmanlı Seyr-i Sefain İdâresi; 6 Dec. 1924 Türkiye Seyr-i Sefain İdâresi; 1926 out of service 1927 sold for breaking up to İlhami Söker.

=== Minelayer (Mayın dökme gemisi) ===
==== Selânik ====
Name (Namesake)	Builder Dimensions Displacement, Hull Speed Complement	Machinery Boiler, Bunkers Engines Armament	Ordered Laid down Launched Trials	Commissioned Decommissioned Afterward
Selânik (Thessaloniki)	- - 270t, Steel -	Steam 1 shaft 1, - 1 triple 3 cyl. 1x37mm QF, 25 mines (1911)	- - - -	1900s tug of Selânik Liman İşlemesi, Salonika; Sep. 1911 seized by Ottoman Navy, converted to minelayer Sep. 1911 commissioned 1927 decommissioned, laid up at Gölcük; Mar. 1915 transported mines to Nusret at Çanakkale.

==== Samsun ====
Name (Namesake)	Builder Dimensions Displacement, Hull Speed Complement	Machinery Boiler, Bunkers Engines Armament	Ordered Laid down Launched Trials	Commissioned Decommissioned Afterward
Samsun (Samsun)	W. A. Stevens, Birkenhead; L 43.8m, B 6.8m, D 3.5m 275t, 48nt, Iron - -	Steam, 2 shafts 2, - 2 triple 3 cyl. vertical Unarmed (1911), 1x76mm QF, 30 mines	1883; 1884; 1884; 1884	1884 Knight of St. Jophn Knight of St. John Tug Co., Liverpool; 1894 Knight of St. John Knight Steamship Co., Liverpool; 1896 Knight of St. John Empreza Insulana de Nav., Lisbon; 1897 Knight of St. John Vincent Stephan Emmanuel Grech, London (based at Gelibolu); 1897 Samsun İdâr-i Mahusa, Constantinople; 28 Aug. 1910 Samsun Osmanlı Seyr-i Sefain, Constantinople; Sep. 1911 transferred to Ottoman Navy converted to minelayer by Tersâne-i Âmire; 23 Nov. 1914 commissioned as minelayer sunk by British HMS E2 at Erdek.

==== İntibâh ====
Name (Namesake)	Builder Dimensions Displacement, Hull Speed Complement	Machinery Boiler, Bunkers Engines Armament	Ordered Laid down Launched Trials	Commissioned Decommissioned Afterward
İntibâh ("Vigilance")	R. Duncan & Co., Glasgow Yd No 233; L 61.2m, B 9.1m, D 4.7m 70t, - 8kts (1915); 12 officers, 46 ratings	Steam, 1 shaft -, - - 10 mines (1915)	1886; 1886; 1886; 1886	1886 Warren Hastings Patrick Keith, J. H. Mudie, Greenock; 21 Dec. 1981 Warren Hastings J. H. Mudie, Greenock; 2 Jun. 1899 Warren Hastings Clive Steam Tug. Co. Ltd., London; 20 Apr. 1903 Warren Hastings Vincent Stephen Emanuel Grech, London (based at Gelibolu); 4 Mar. 1912 sold to Ottoman government Apr. 1914 commissioned İntibâh as salvage tug Dec. 1914 converted to minelayer by Tersâne-i Âmire, Istanbul; Oct. 1918-Oct. 1923 laid up at Constantinople; 1923 renamed Uyanık; 1933 renamed İntibâh; 1933-34 refitted by Gölcük Shipyard; 1956 decommissioned, laid up Gölcük; 1958 sold privately 1959-64 converted to general cargo motorship 1964 Ararat M. Okan (Mustafa Okanoğulları Gemicilik San. ve Tic. A.Ş), Istanbul.

==== Muzaffer ====
Name (Namesake)	Builder Dimensions Displacement, Hull Speed Complement	Machinery Boiler, Bunkers Engines Armament	Ordered Laid down Launched Trials	Commissioned Decommissioned Afterward
Muzaffer ("Triumphant")	- 70t, - 8kts (1915) -	Steam, 1 shaft -, - - 10 mines (1914)	- - - -	1913 commissioned as tug Aug. 1914 converted to minelayer by Tersâne-Âmire, Istanbul; 1915 pilot vessel in the Bosporus; Oct. 1918 decommissioned.

==== Nusret ====
Name (Namesake)	Builder Dimensions Displacement, Hull Speed Complement	Machinery Boiler, Bunkers Engines Armament	Ordered Laid down Launched Trials	Commissioned Decommissioned Afterward
Nusret ("God's help")	Schiff & Maschinenbau Germania, Kiel; LPP 40.2m, B 7.5m, D 3.4m 365t, Steel; 15kts (trial), 12kts (1914) -	Steam, 2 shafts 2 Schultz water tube, - 2 triple 3 cyl. vertical, 1200ihp, Gremania; 2x47mm QF K, 40 mines (1913), 2x57mm QF, 60 mines (1927)	1910; 1911; 4 Dec. 1911; 1912	1913; Oct. 1918-1926 laid up at Constantinople; 1926-27 refitted by Gölcük Shipyard; 1937 renamed Yardım diver vessel 1939 renamed Nusret tender 1955 decommissioned, laid up at Gölcük; 1962 sold privately 1962-66 converted to general cargo ship 1966 Kaptan Nusret K. Kalkavan ve İsmaili Kaptanoğlu, Istanbul; 1979 Kaptan Nusret A. Tombul, Istanbul; 1980 Kaptan Nusret M. Okan, Istanbul; Apr. 1989 sunk.

==== Gayret ====
Name (Namesake)	Builder Dimensions Displacement, Hull Speed Complement	Machinery Boiler, Bunkers Engines Armament	Ordered Laid down Launched Trials	Commissioned Decommissioned Afterward
Geyret ("Endeavour")	Wigham Richardson & Co., Newcastle Yd No 86; L 30.6m, B 5.8m, D 3.4m 144gt, 37nt, 130t, Iron; 9kts (1914) -	Steam, 1 shaft 1 Scotch, - 1 compound 2 cyl., vertical, A. Shanks & Son; 15 mines (1914)	1885; 1885; 1885; 1885	1885 Shannon E.A. Gore, Limerick; 24 Apr. 1890 Shannon B. Nicholson, Limerick converted to salvage tug 20 Jul. 1890 Harlequin G.A. Courtenay Schenley, Limerick; 1891 Harlequin R. Grech, Limerick (based at Gelibolu); 27 Oct. 1896 Harlequin Alfred, William & Richard Grech, Limerick; 19 Nov. 1901 Harlequin Vincent Stephen Emanuel Grech, Limerick; 18 Jun. 1907 sold to Ottoman government Jul. 1907 Gayret İdâre-i Mahusa, Constantinople; 28 Aug. 1910 Gayret Osmanlı Seyr-i Sefain İdâresi, Constantinople; 30 Jul. 1914 transferred to Ottoman Navy converted to minelayer by Tersâne-i Âmire, Istanbul; 30 Jul. 1914 commissioned Oct. 1918 returned to Osmanlı Seyr-i Sefain İdâresi, Constantinople; 1927 out of service, sold for breaking up.

==== Nilüfer ====
Name (Namesake)	Builder Dimensions Displacement, Hull Speed Complement	Machinery Boiler, Bunkers Engines Armament	Ordered Laid down Launched Trials	Commissioned Decommissioned Afterward
Nilüfer ("Lotus")	J & G Thompson, Glasgow; LOA 80.7m, LPP 77.1m, B 10.6m, D 3.6m 1088gt, 753nt, 1545ts, Steel; 15kts (1914); 55	Steam, 2 shafts 2, J & G Thompson, 95t coal 2 triple 3 cyl. vertical, 5500ihp, J & G Thompson; 1x57mm QF 60 mines	1889; 1890; 5 Jun. 1890; 21 Jul. 1890	Jul. 1890 Frederica London & South Western Railway Co., Southampton; Jun. 1911 sold to Ottoman; Jul. 1911 Nilüfer Osmanlı Seyr-i Sefain İdâresi, Constantinople; Jul. 1914 transferred to Ottoman Navy; 7 Aug. 1914 converted to minelayer by Tersâne-i Âmire, Istanbul; 4 Sep. 1914 commissioned 17 Nov. 1914 left for the Black Sea; 19 Nov. 1914 sunk by Russian mine about 10 miles northwest of the Bosporus, 55 lives lost.

==== Ron ====
Name (Namesake)	Builder Dimensions Displacement, Hull Speed Complement	Machinery Boiler, Bunkers Engines Armament	Ordered Laid down Launched Trials	Commissioned Decommissioned Afterward
Ron	J. P. Rennoldson & Co., South Shields Yd No 150; L 36.7m, B 6.4m, D 3.2m 216t, 33nt, Steel; 9kts (1914); 2 officers, 12 ratings	Steam, 2 shafts 2 surface condenser, - 2 triple expansion 3 cyl., 600ihp, Rennoldson; 20 mines	1895; 1895; 1895; 1895	1895 Flying Coot Clyde Shipping Co., Glasgow; Rhône Cie de Ramorquage, de Pilotage et du Sautage, Marseille; 1911 S. Bandermaly, Constantinople (French flag); Sep. 1914 seized by Ottoman government 11 Sep. 1914 commissioned Ron; 30 Dec. 1914 sunk by Russian mine off the Bosporus; 3 lives lost.

=== Minesweeper ship (Mayın tarama gemisi) ===
==== Castor class ====
Name (Namesake)	Builder Dimensions Displacement, Hull Speed Complement	Machinery Boiler, Bunkers Engines Armament	Ordered Laid down Launched Trials	Commissioned Decommissioned Afterward
Castor	Stettiner AG für Schiffs und Maschinenbau, Stettin; LPP 22.6m, B 4.7m, D 1.6m 52t, Steel; 6kts (1914); 1 officer, 5 ratings (1914)	Steam, 1 shaft 1 locomotive type, Stettiner AG; 1 compound 2 cyl.m 120ihp, Stettiner AG; 1x37mm QF (1914), Disarmed (1915)	1889; 1890; 1890; 1890	1890 Pollux Kaiserliche Marine; Aug. 1913 decommissioned 1914 sold privately and sen to Constantinople; Aug. 1914 seized y the Ottoman government Aug. 1914 commissioned as minesweeper Oct. 1918 decommissioned.
Pollux	Stettiner AG für Schiffs und Maschinenbau, Stettin; LPP 22.6m, B 4.7m, D 1.6m 52t, Steel; 6kts (1914); 1 officer, 5 ratings (1914)	Steam, 1 shaft 1 locomotive type, Stettiner AG; 1 compound 2 cyl.m 120ihp, Stettiner AG; 1x37mm QF (1914), Disarmed (1915)	1889; 1890; 1890; 1890	1890 Pollux Kaiserliche Marine; Aug. 1913 decommissioned 1914 sold privately and sen to Constantinople; Aug. 1914 seized y the Ottoman government Aug. 1914 commissioned as minesweeper Oct. 1918 decommissioned.

=== Minesweeper boat (Mayın tarama botu) ===
==== MTB 1 class ====
Name (Namesake)	Builder Dimensions Displacement, Hull Speed Complement	Machinery Boiler, Bunkers Engines Armament	Ordered Laid down Launched Trials	Commissioned Decommissioned Afterward
MTB 1	Kremer Sohn, Elmshorn - 10t, - - -	1 diesel, 1 shaft -, - - Unarmed	Jul. 1915 - 1915 -	Oct. 1916; 1919
MTB 2	Kremer Sohn, Elmshorn - 10t, - - -	1 diesel, 1 shaft -, - - Unarmed	Jul. 1915 - 1915 -	Oct. 1916; 1919
MTB 3	Kremer Sohn, Elmshorn - 10t, - - -	1 diesel, 1 shaft -, - - Unarmed	Jul. 1915 - 1915 -	Oct. 1916; 1919
MTB 4	Kremer Sohn, Elmshorn - 10t, - - -	1 diesel, 1 shaft -, - - Unarmed	Jul. 1915 - 1915 -	Oct. 1916; 1919
MTB 5	Kremer Sohn, Elmshorn - 10t, - - -	1 diesel, 1 shaft -, - - Unarmed	Jul. 1915 - 1915 -	Oct. 1916; 1919
MTB 6	Kremer Sohn, Elmshorn - 10t, - - -	1 diesel, 1 shaft -, - - Unarmed	Jul. 1915 - 1915 -	Oct. 1916; 1919

==== MTB 7 class ====
Name (Namesake)	Builder Dimensions Displacement, Hull Speed Complement	Machinery Boiler, Bunkers Engines Armament	Ordered Laid down Launched Trials	Commissioned Decommissioned Afterward
MTB 7	- LPP 8.0m, B 1.8m, D 0.7m 2.5t, - - 4	1 diesel, 50 bhp, 1 shaft -, - - Unarmed	1916; 1916 - -	1917; 1919
MTB 8	- LPP 8.0m, B 1.8m, D 0.7m 2.5t, - - 4	1 diesel, 50 bhp, 1 shaft -, - - Unarmed	1916; 1916 - -	1916; 1919
MTB 9	- LPP 8.0m, B 1.8m, D 0.7m 2.5t, - - 4	1 diesel, 50 bhp, 1 shaft -, - - Unarmed	1916; 1916 - -	1916; 1919
