= Tarsus Çanakkale Park Museum =

Museum in Turkey

Çanakkale Park Museum
- Çanakkale Park Müzesi
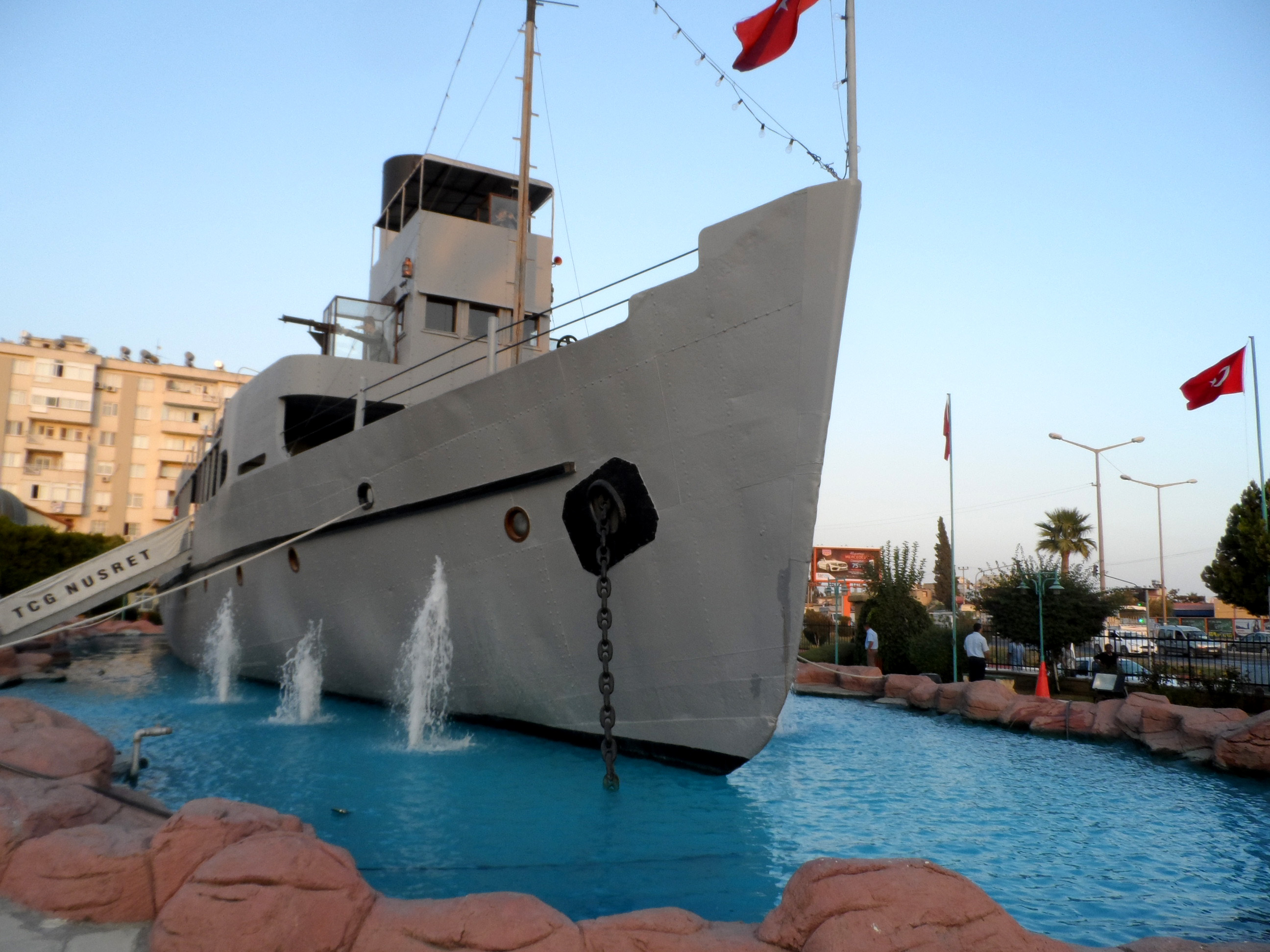
- Nusret minelayer

- Çanakkele Museum
- Established: 2013; 13 years ago
- Coordinates: 36°54′26″N 34°53′04″E
- Type: History
- Owner: Tarsus municipality

Tarsus Çanakkale Park Museum is a museum in Turkey. The main exhibition of the museum is Nusret minelayer. The museum is free of charge.

== Location ==
The museum is an 6,000 square metres (65,000 sq ft) - open air museum in Tarsus ilçe (district) of Mersin Province at 36°54′26″N 34°53′04″E. The minelayer is situated in a park laying at the north side of the Turkish state highway D.400 to Mersin. The auxiliary building is situated to the east of the ship.

== Nusret ==
Nusret is a famous ship for her services during the naval operations in the Dardanelles Campaign of World War I. The length of the ship is 40 metres (130 ft) and width is 7.5 metres (25 ft). (Although the original name was Nusret, she is also called Nusret). Her service life as a minelayer ended in 1955. In 1962 it was sold to a private firm to be used as a dry cargo ship. In 1990 she was sunk in Mersin Harbor.

== Rescue operation ==
In 1999 she was rescued by a group of volunteers in Mersin. But her fate was to be sold to be used as a raw material in industry. Tarsus municipality decided to keep the minelayer as a commemorative of the naval victory. On 4 October 2002, she was carried to Tarsus from Mersin. Although the distance between Mersin and Tarsus is only 27 kilometres (17 mi), it took 4.5 hours to carry it. Tarsus mayor (and 2014-2019 Mersin metropolitan municipality mayor) Burhanettin Kocamaz said; "Now hero Nusret, you can sleep properly in your place Çanakkale Park, this is your place. Your destiny is changed. Tarsus and people in Tarsus owned you" during the naval victory celebrations held on 18 March 2003, on the 88th anniversary of the naval victory He added that Tarsus municipality was awarded a certificate of appreciation from Turkish Naval Forces.

During her usage as a cargo ship she had been modified. Thus a group of experts were sent to Çanakkale (theatre of the naval battle) to learn the details of the original vessel. Accordingly, the ship was repaired. She was opened to visits on 27 December 2003, during the anniversary of liberation of Tarsus from French occupation following the First World War.

== Other exhibits ==
In the auxiliary building there are other exhibits about Gallipoli Campaign (including land battles). Tophaneli Hakkı Bey (the commander of the minelayer) has a special section in this building. There is a symbolic military cemetery including Seyit Onbaşı (Seyit Çabuk) who was famed as a very strong corporal carrying a 275 kilograms (606 lb) shell during a crucial moment in the naval battle.

== Gallery ==
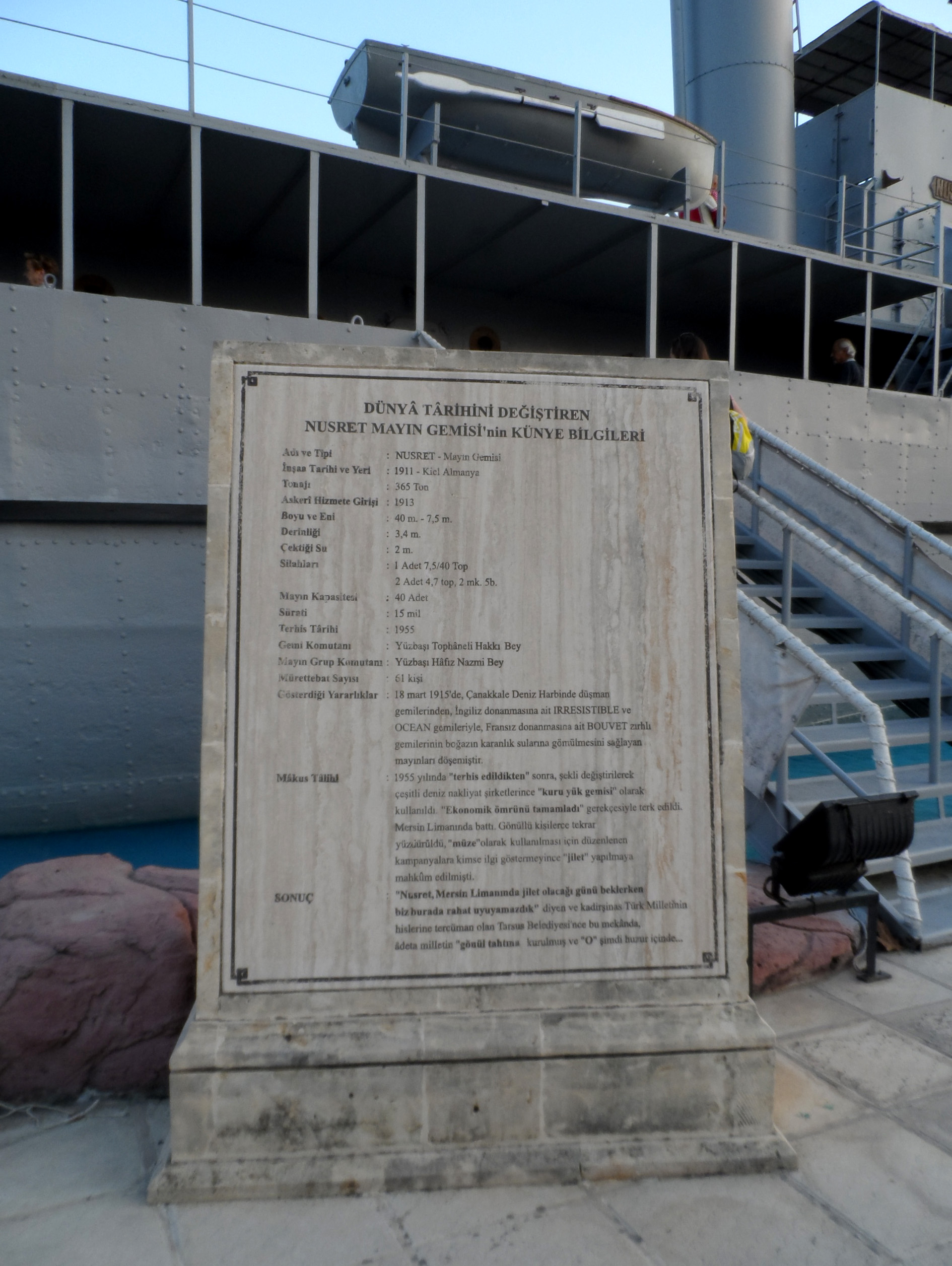
Name plate of Nusret minelayer

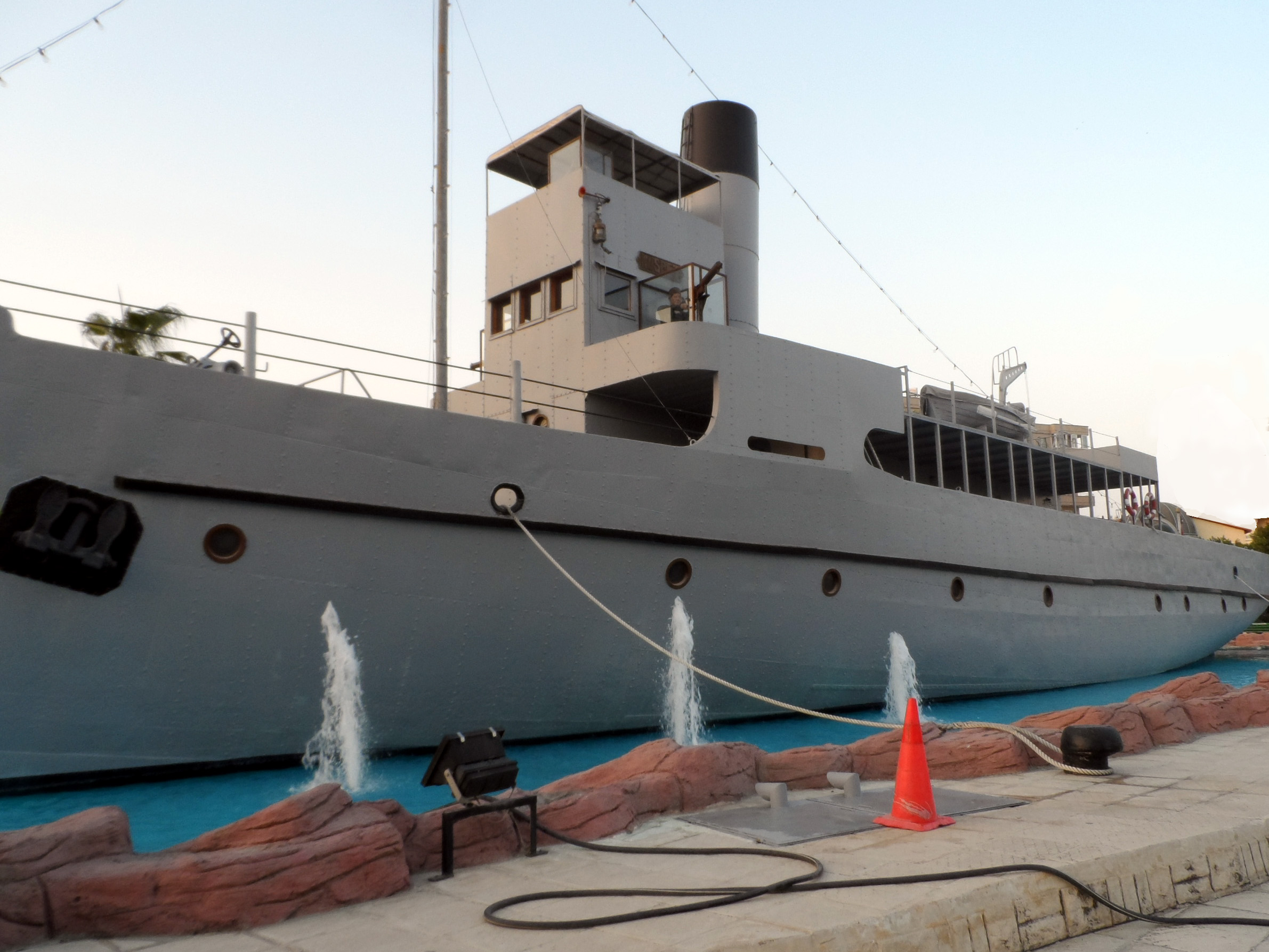
Nusret minelayer

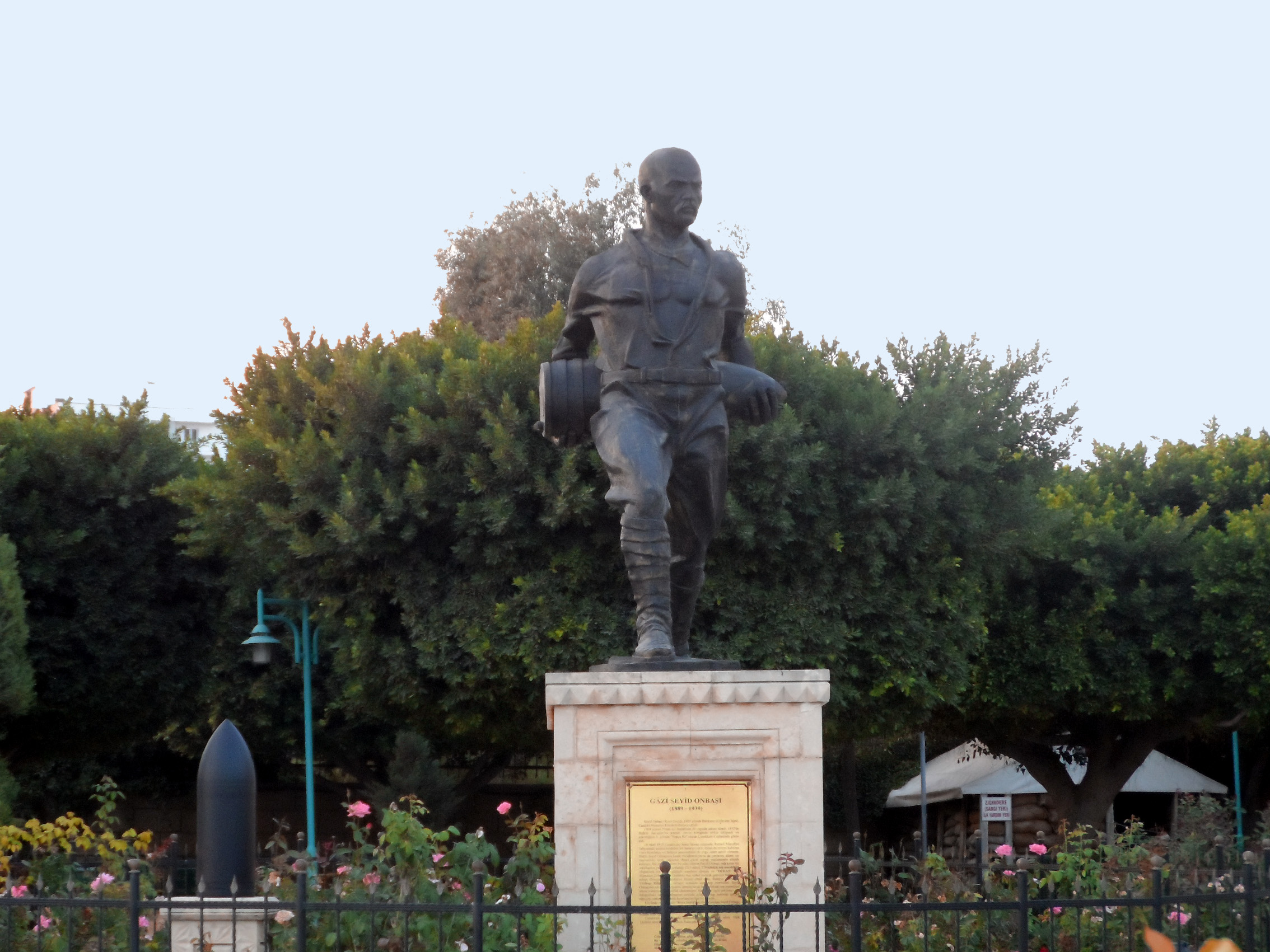
Seyit Onbaşı statue in Tarsus
