= Seyit Çabuk =

Turkish corporal in World War I

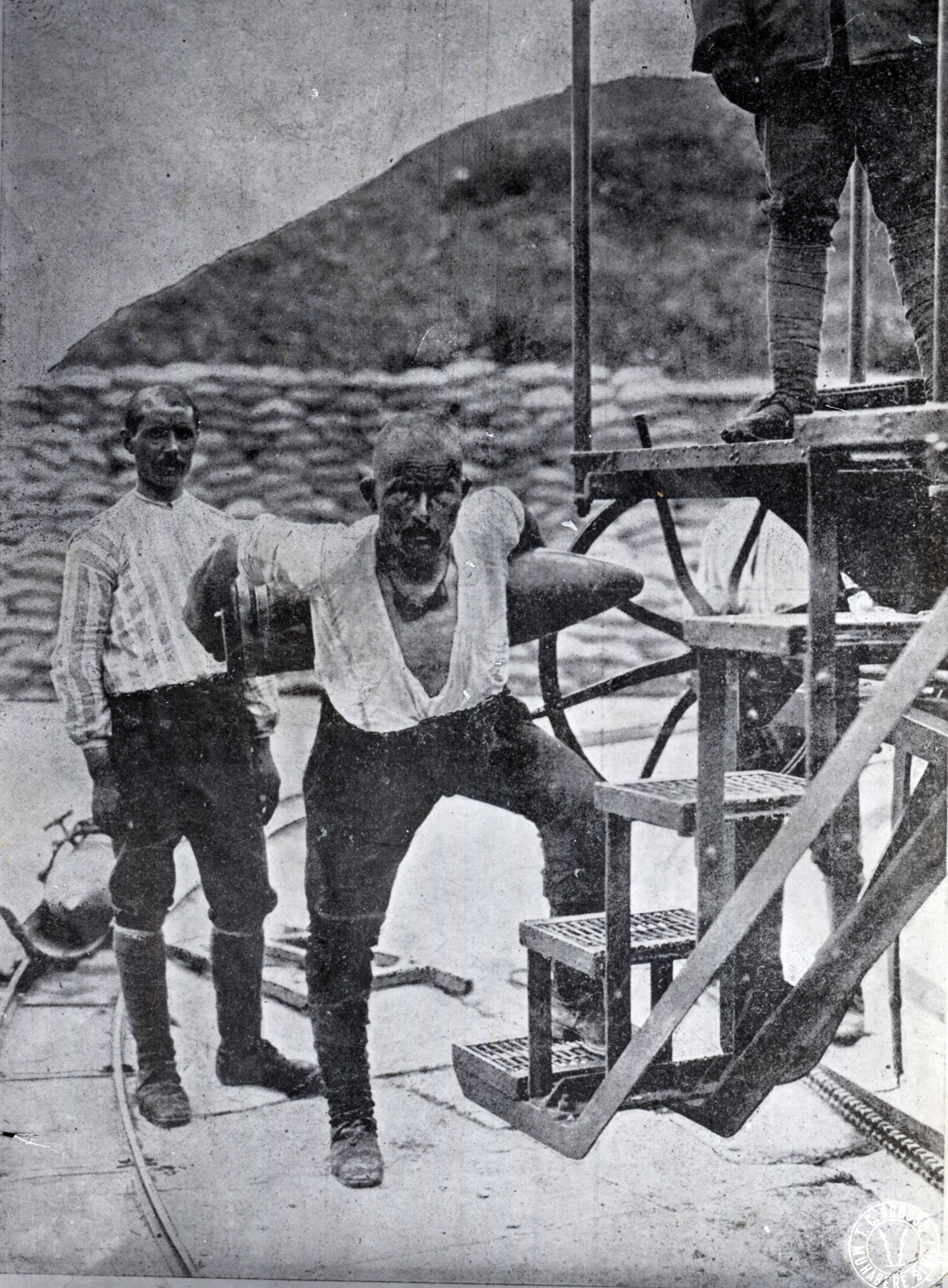
- Corporal Seyit posing with a wooden replica of the shell. After the battle he was not able to reenact his deed for the photographer.
- Born: 1889; Havran, Hüdavendigâr vilayet, Ottoman Empire (now Havran, Balıkesir, Turkey)
- Died: 1939 (aged 49–50)
- Military career
- Allegiance: Ottoman Empire
- Branch: Artillery
- Service years: 1909–1918
- Rank: Corporal
- Nicknames: Havranlı, Koca Seyit (Big Seyit)
- Unit: Mecidiye Coastal Battery
- Conflicts: Balkan Wars; Gallipoli campaign
- Awards: Gallipoli Star
- Memorials: Seyit Onbaşı Memorial, Gallipoli

Seyit Ali Çabuk (1889–1939), usually called Corporal Seyit (Turkish: Seyit Onbaşı) was a First World War gunner in the Ottoman Army. He is famous for having carried three shells to an artillery piece during the Allied attempt to force the Dardanelles on 18 March 1915.

== Personal life and military career ==
Born in the village of Havran, he enlisted into the army in April 1909. After serving in the Balkan Wars of 1912–1913, he was transferred to Mecidiye Coastal Battery defending the Mediterranean entrance to Çanakkale.

Following the heavy naval bombardment of the forts guarding the Narrows on 18 March 1915, the gun he was serving in the Mecidiye fort remained operational, but its shell crane had been damaged and the other gunners in the area were injured.

Corporal Seyit, by himself, is said to have carried three artillery shells each weighing 276 kg to the 240/35 mm gun and enabled it to continue firing on the Allied Fleet. He shot three rounds at the British pre-dreadnought HMS Ocean which was trying to rescue sailors of HMS Irresistible that had been hit and disabled by a mine earlier. His first two shots didn’t inflict much damage but his third shot inflicted a severe injury to HMS Ocean. The shot landed under the waterline of the ship, causing the ship to drift towards and hit one of the mines that the mine crew of Nusret had laid. HMS Ocean capsized shortly after.

Following the repulsion of the naval assault, Seyit was promoted to corporal and publicized as an iconic Turkish hero. After the Battle of Çanakkale, he was asked to have his picture taken with the shell which he famously carried. Corporal Seyit could not move the shell no matter how hard he tried. Afterwards, Corporal Seyit uttered the famous words "If war breaks out again, I'll lift it again." After that, his photo was taken with a wooden shell.

He was discharged in 1918 and became a forester and later a coal-miner. He took the surname Çabuk in 1934 with the passing of the Surname Law. He died of pneumonia in 1939. A statue of him carrying a shell was erected in 1992, just south of Kilitbahir Castle on the Gelibolu Peninsula.
