= HSwMS Visborg =

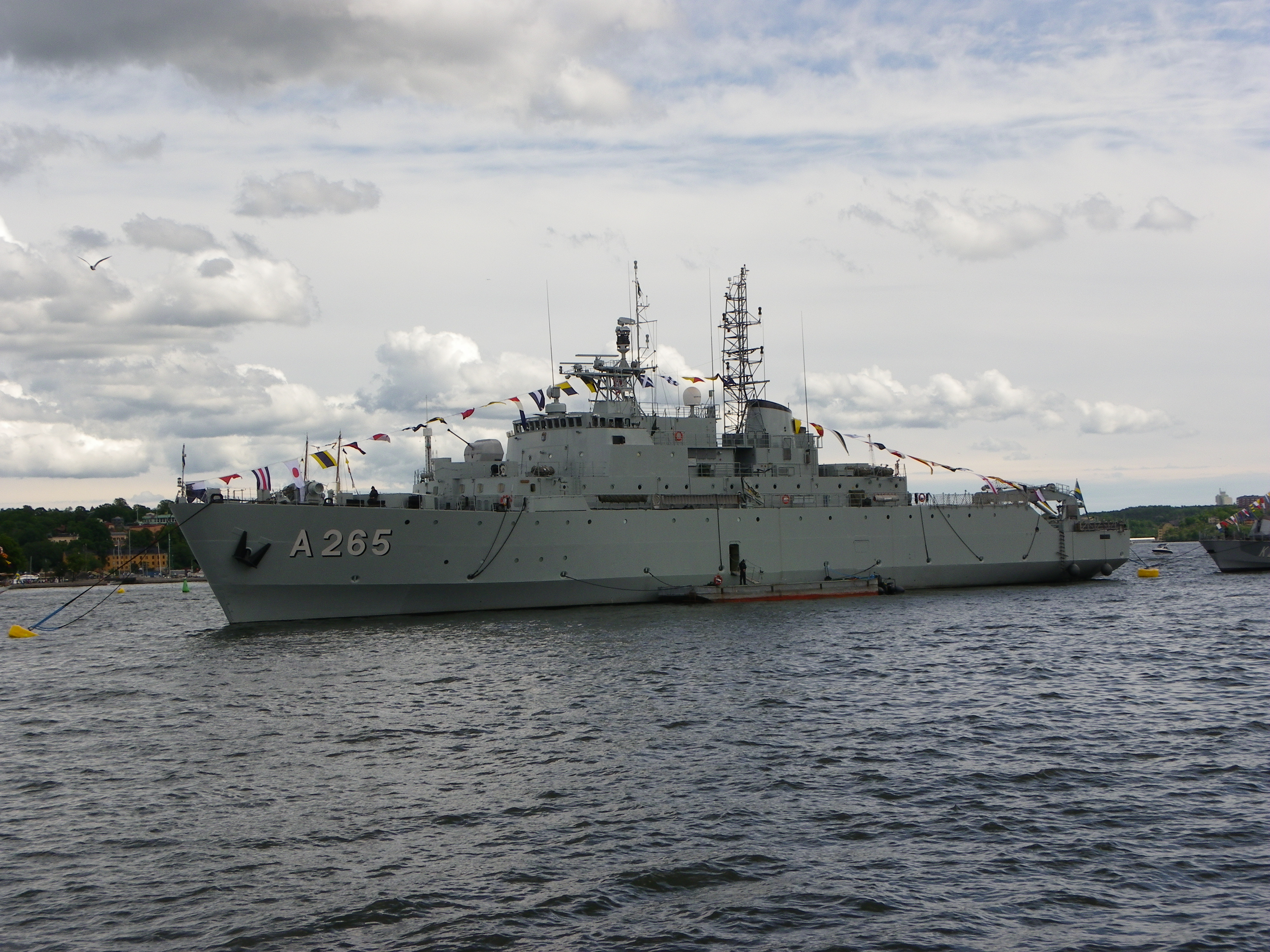
- HSwMS Visborg during the wedding of Victoria, Crown Princess of Sweden, and Daniel Westling.

History

Sweden
- Name: Visborg
- Namesake: Visborg
- Builder: Karlskronavarvet AB
- Laid down: 16 October 1973
- Launched: 22 January 1974
- Commissioned: 6 February 1976
- Decommissioned: 30 December 2010
- Identification: MMSI number: 265500300; Callsign: SCID
- Fate: Broken up in 2013
- Notes: As M03 from 1976-1999 with the role as a minelayer.
- Badge

General characteristics
- Class & type: Auxiliary
- Displacement: 2590 tonnes
- Length: 92.4m
- Beam: 14.7m
- Draft: 4m
- Propulsion: 2x NOHAB V12-diesels @ 1545 kW each
- Speed: 16 knots
- Complement: 20 Officers; 20 Seamen
- Sensors & processing systems: PN-613; PN-619; PS-726; PE-727
- Electronic warfare & decoys: PQ-826
- Armament: 3 × Bofors 40mm m/48; 4 Machinegun groups

HSwMS Visborg (A265) previously (M03), was a command/auxiliary ship in the Swedish Navy and was a part of the 4th Naval Warfare Flotilla. She was decommissioned 2010. HSwMS Trossö replaced her role as a support ship at the 4th Naval Warfare Flotilla.

== History ==
She served as a minelayer from 1976 until 1999 when she was refitted to her current role as a command ship. Her sister ship HSwMS Älvsborg was sold to the Chilean Navy 1997 and renamed Almirante José Toribio Merino Castro. The last conscripts served during the year 2010 and also honoured the royal wedding with their presence the same year. She was then taken out of active duty and her planned replacement is HSwMS Trossö which returned from the EUNAVFOR operation Atalanta 2010.

In 2013 Visborg was delivered to Oresund Dry Docks in Landskrona, Sweden, for breaking.
