= Pluton-class minelayer (1912) =

Pair of minelayers

- Line-drawing of the Pluton class

Class overview
- Name: Pluton class
- Operators: French Navy
- Preceded by: None
- Built: 1912–1914
- In commission: 1914–1921
- Completed: 2
- Scrapped: 2

General characteristics
- Type: Minelayer
- Displacement: 565 long tons (574 t)
- Length: 199 ft 5 in (60.8 m) o/a; 193 ft 7 in (59.0 m) p/p
- Beam: 27 ft 3 in (8.3 m)
- Draught: 14 ft 2 in (4.3 m)
- Installed power: 2 water-tube boilers; 6,000 ihp (4,500 kW)
- Propulsion: 2 shafts; 2 triple-expansion steam engines
- Speed: 21 knots (39 km/h; 24 mph)
- Range: 1,900 nmi (3,500 km; 2,200 mi) at 16 knots (30 km/h; 18 mph)
- Complement: 52
- Armament: 1 × 75 mm (3 in) gun; 140 × mines

The Pluton-class minelayers were a pair of ships built just before World War I for the French Navy as their first purpose-built minelayers. They spent the first few months of the war laying minefields off captured Belgian ports and in the English Channel in conjunction with British ships. Pluton remained there for the rest of the war, but Cerbère was transferred to the eastern Mediterranean Sea in 1915. The ship laid minefields off the Syrian coast and the Dardanelles. Later in the war she laid minefields in the southern Adriatic as well. Both ships were struck from the Navy List in 1921 and sold for scrap.

== Design and description ==
The French Navy noted the effectiveness of mines during the Russo-Japanese War of 1904–05 and experimented with them by converting two elderly torpedo-gunboats in 1911–12. They were not very successful and the French concluded that specially designed ships were necessary. Two new minelayers were ordered as part of the 1912 Naval Program, Pluton and Cerbère, the first purpose-built minelayers of the French Navy.

=== General description ===
The Pluton-class ships had an overall length of 199 feet 5 inches (60.8 m) and a length between perpendiculars of 193 feet 7 inches (59.0 m). They had a beam of 27 feet 3 inches (8.3 m), and a draft of 14 feet 2 inches (4.3 m). The ships displaced 565 long tons (574 t) at normal load and 594 long tons (604 t) at deep load.

Pluton and Cerbère were given rudders at bow and stern for the precision maneuvering deemed by the navy to be necessary for their mission. Their hulls were subdivided into ten watertight compartments by transverse bulkheads. They had a crew of three officers and 49 men.

=== Propulsion ===
They were powered by two vertical triple-expansion steam engines, each driving a single propeller shaft. The engines developed a total of 6,000 indicated horsepower (4,500 kW) from two water-tube boilers. On sea trials the ships reached a maximum speed of 21.5 knots (39.8 km/h; 24.7 mph). The Pluton-class ships carried a maximum of 180 long tons (180 t) of coal which gave them a range of 1,900 nautical miles (3,500 km; 2,200 mi) at 16 knots (30 km/h; 18 mph).

=== Armament ===
The Pluton-class ships were armed with a single 75-millimeter (3 in) gun mounted in front of the bridge. They carried 140 550-kilogram (1,213 lb) Sauter-Harle mines. The mines were carried on trolleys that ran on four rails on the mine deck that led to two doors in the stern of the ship, from which they were dropped.

== Service ==
Cerbère was laid down in August 1911 and launched on 13 July 1912 by Chantiers Normand in Le Havre. Pluton was launched on 10 March 1913 by Ateliers et Chantiers de Bretagne in Nantes. Both ships were completed in 1914 and were assigned to the Northern Squadron (French: Escadre du Nord) in the English Channel under the command of Admiral Rouyer when World War I began. Pluton captured the German merchant ship SS Porto in the Channel on 5 August 1914. For the rest of 1914 they laid minefields off Ostend, Zeebrugge and other ports in German-occupied Flanders, often in conjunction with, and at the request of, the Royal Navy. While Pluton spend the rest of the war in the Channel, Cerbère was transferred to the Mediterranean in 1915. She laid minefields mostly off the Syrian coast and the Dardanelles before joining the Anglo-French naval force on 31 May 1916 that pressured the Greek government into acceding to Allied demands for control of Greek communications and transportation infrastructure. The ship spent the rest of the war operating in the southern Adriatic as well as the eastern Mediterranean. Both ships were deemed surplus to requirements after the end of the war and were scrapped in 1921.

== Bibliography ==
- Couhat, Jean Labayle (1974). French Warships of World War I. London: Ian Allan. ISBN 0-7110-0445-5.
- Newbolt, Henry (1996). Naval Operations. History of the Great War Based on Official Documents. Vol. IV (reprint of the 1928 ed.). Nashville, TN: Battery Press. ISBN 0-89839-253-5.
- Roberts, Stephen S. (2021). French Warships in the Age of Steam 1859–1914: Design, Construction, Careers and Fates. Barnsley, UK: Seaforth Publishing. ISBN 978-1-5267-4533-0.
- Simpson, Lloyd P. (1969). "France's First Real Minelayers: Cerbere and Pluton". Warship International. VI (3): 228–231.
- Smigielski, Adam (1985). "France". In Gray, Randal (ed.). Conway's All the World's Fighting Ships 1906–1921. Annapolis, Maryland: Naval Institute Press. pp. 190–220. ISBN 0-87021-907-3.
