= Gonca (ship) =

Turkish steamship

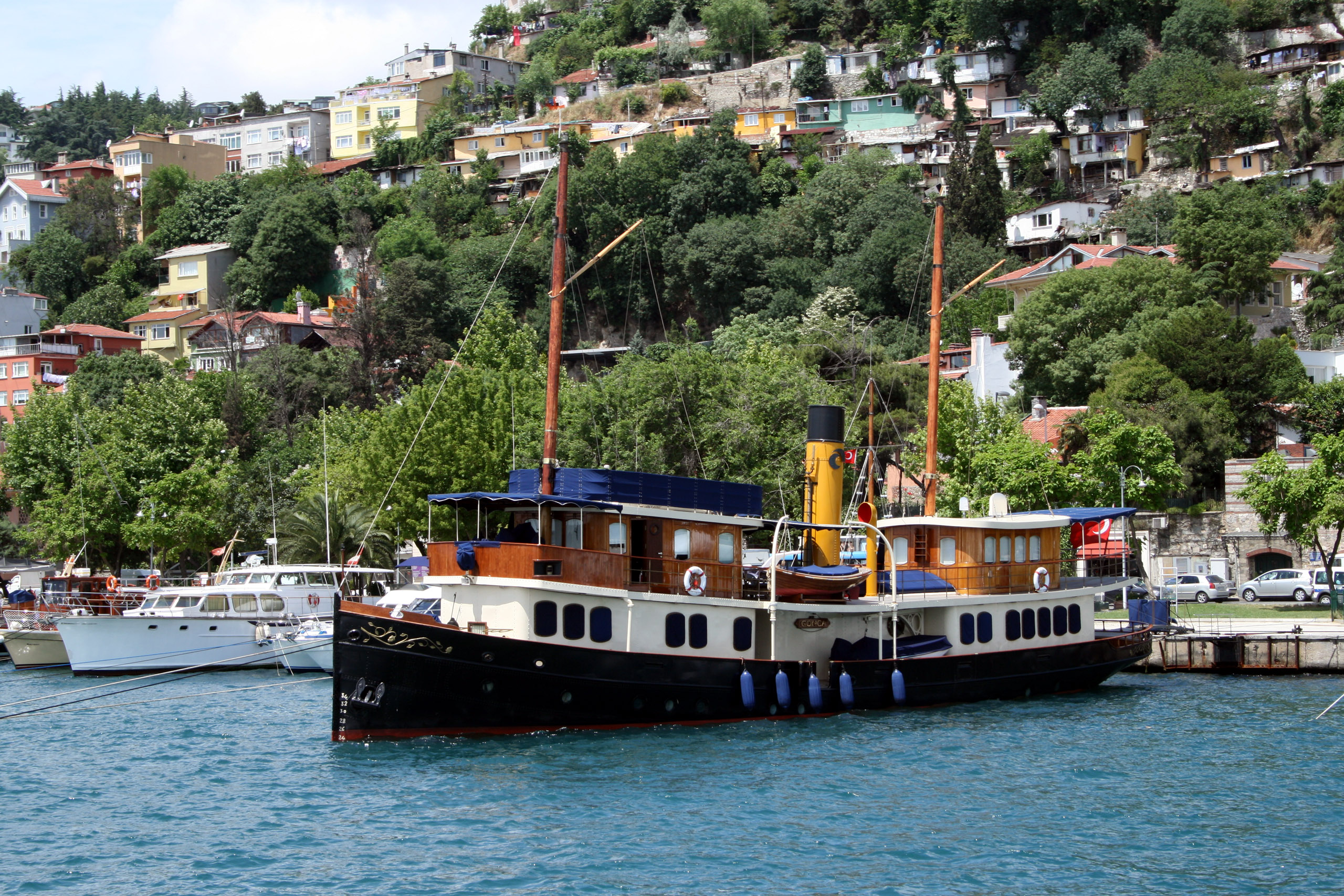
- Gonca in 2007

History

Ottoman Empire
- Name: Selânik
- Builder: Unknown
- Commissioned: c. 1907 - 1909
- Fate: Converted to a transport ship.

Turkey
- Name: Gonca (1927)
- Status: Active as of 2020

General characteristics
- Length: 108.21 ft (32.98 m)
- Beam: 6.00 m
- Draft: 3.25 m
- Propulsion: Triple expansion reciprocating steam engines, single propeller.
- Speed: 8 knots
- Complement: 6 crew and 6 passengers
- Armament: 1x37mm Quick-firing gun, 25 mines (Ottoman Navy configuration)

Gonca is a Turkish steamship built sometime between 1907 and 1909 and homeported in Istanbul. The ship currently serves as an excursion ship and steam yacht for charter. It is unknown where the ship was built, but markings on the ship's engine suggest that at least that part of the ship and potentially other machinery was built in Britain. Gonca was constructed as the support ship Selânik for the French harbor management company in charge of developing modern infrastructure for the port of Salonica on behalf of the Ottoman authorities. In the final years of Ottoman rule, the Société Anonyme Ottomane de Construction et Exploitation du Port de Salonique was tasked with developing several modern commercial shipping piers as well as railroad connections and others support infrastructure for the port of Salonica.

The ship was pressed into service as a minelayer by the Ottoman navy in September 1911 during the Italo-Ottoman War and was not returned to her owners due to the fall of Salonica to Greece in the First Balkan War in 1912. In order to prevent the ship's capture by the Greeks, the Ottoman commander of the Salonica minelaying flotilla briefly transferred the ships to French registry, prompting an immediate diplomatic protest by the neutral French observers when the ships came under attack by the Greeks. Selânik and the other minelayers were then allowed safe passage out of the surrendering city by the Greeks before returning to the Ottoman flag upon passing through the Dardanelles.

During the First World War, the ship continued to serve as a minelayer at Çanakkale and is one of only two surviving ships to have served in this role (the other being the purpose-built minelayer Nusrat in Tarsus). With the end of the First World War the ship was laid up in Gonca Bay at Gölcük Naval Base until 1927, when she was converted into a transport ship and given her current name Gonca. After 1944 the ship was used by the Turkish Navy as a work ferry and served for many years carrying workers between Izmit and Gölcük before being decommissioned in 1989. In 1993, the ship was saved from scrapping by the Rahmi M. Koç Museum, which moved the ship to Tuzla, Istanbul to begin work to restore her Ottoman-era Edwardian fittings. Gonca was relaunched in 1997 and is currently owned by the Rahmi M. Koç Museum.
