= Amur-class minelayer (1898) =

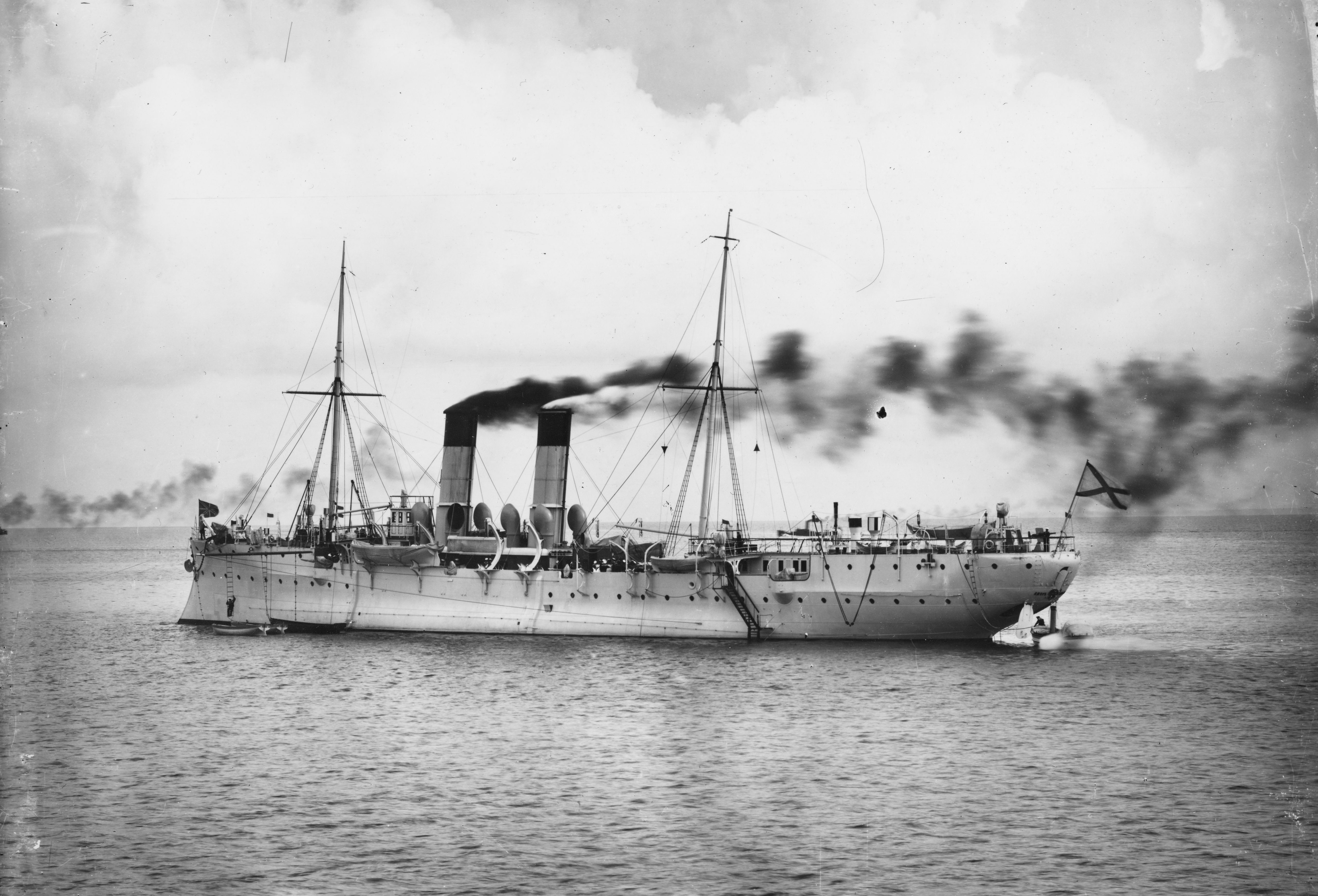
- Amur at anchor, the door for her center mine rail is visible in the stern

Class overview
- Builders: Baltic Works, Saint Petersburg
- Operators: Russian Navy
- Preceded by: None
- Succeeded by: Amur-class minelayer of 1905
- Built: 1898–1899
- In commission: 1899–1904
- Completed: 2
- Lost: 2

General characteristics
- Type: minelayer
- Displacement: 3,010 long tons (3,058 t)
- Length: 300 ft (91.4 m)
- Beam: 41 ft (12.5 m)
- Draft: 18 ft (5.5 m)
- Installed power: 4,700 ihp (3,505 kW)
- Propulsion: 2 shafts, 2 Vertical triple expansion steam engines; 12 coal-fired water-tube boilers
- Speed: 18 knots (33 km/h; 21 mph)
- Range: 2,000 nmi (3,700 km; 2,300 mi) at 10 kn (19 km/h; 12 mph)
- Complement: 317
- Armament: 5 × 3-inch (76 mm) guns; 7 × 47-millimeter (1.9 in) guns; 1 × 15-inch (381 mm) torpedo tube; 300 mines

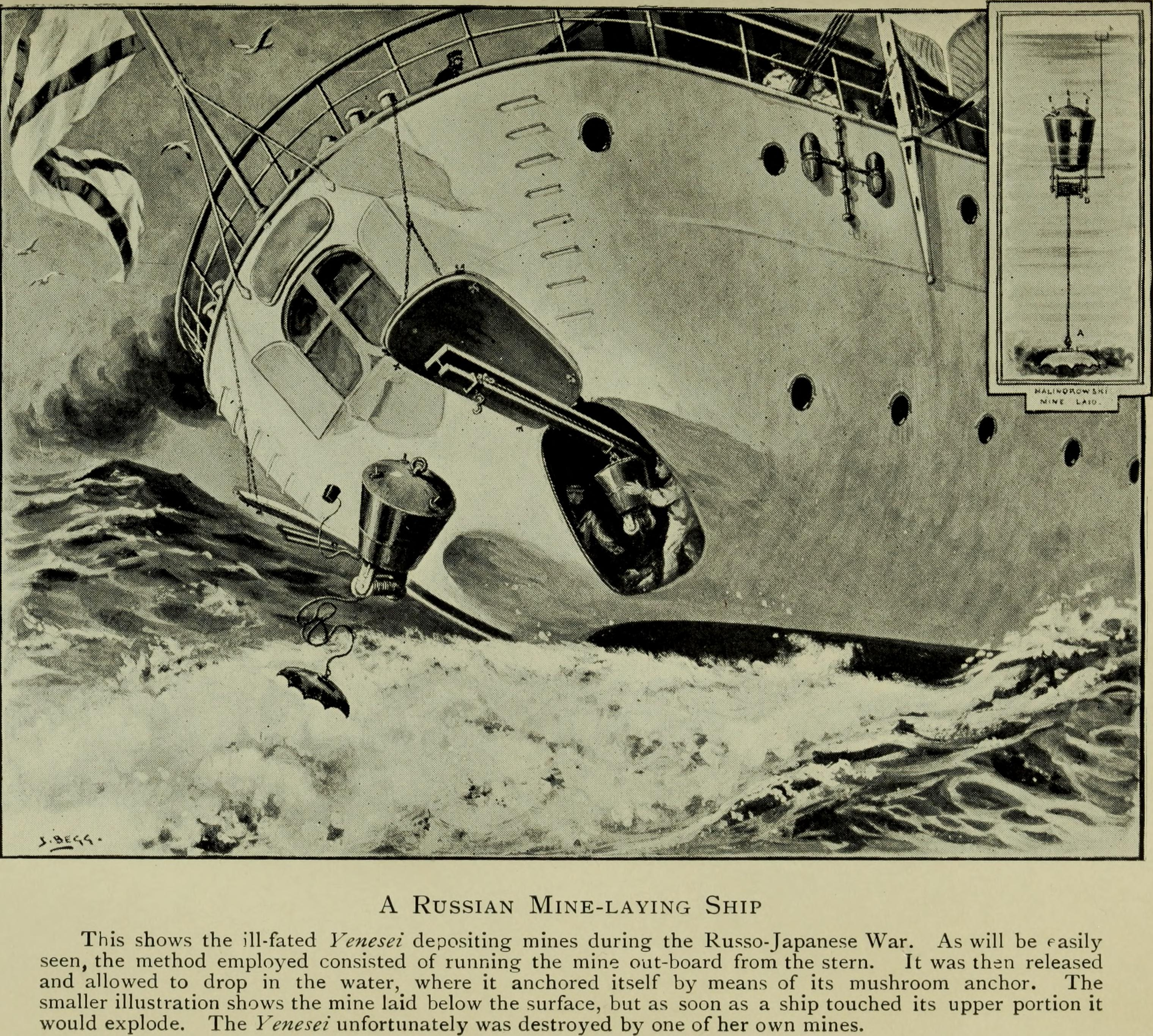
The Yenisei

The Amur-class minelayers were the first purpose-built, ocean-going minelayers in the world. The class consisted of two vessels: Amur and Yenisei. Both ships were constructed for the Imperial Russian Navy in the late 1890s. During the Russo-Japanese War of 1904–05 they were assigned to the Pacific Fleet. Yenisei struck one of her own mines two days after the war began while laying a minefield and sank. One of Amur's minefields sank the Japanese pre-dreadnought battleships Hatsuse and Yashima. Amur was sunk by Japanese howitzers in December 1904 after the Japanese had gained control of the heights around Port Arthur. She was later salvaged and scrapped by the Japanese.

== Design and description ==
The Amur-class minelayers were designed to drop their mines while at high speed and were given a pronounced, overhanging, stern that allowed the mines to be dropped behind the propellers through doors in the stern. Each door was served by a rail that led directly to the mine storage compartments.

The Amur-class ships were 300 feet (91.4 m) long at the waterline; they had a beam of 41 feet (12.5 m) and a draft of 18 feet (5.5 m). They had two pole masts and a ram bow.

The ships had two vertical triple expansion steam engines, each powering one propeller. Twelve Belleville water-tube boilers provided steam. The engines were designed to produce a total of 4,700 indicated horsepower (3,500 kW) and gave the ship a top speed of 18 knots (33 km/h; 21 mph). They carried 400 long tons (406 t) of coal that provided a range of 2,000 nautical miles (3,700 km; 2,300 mi) at a speed of 10 knots (19 km/h; 12 mph).

The main armament of the Amur-class ships consisted of five 75-millimeter (3.0 in) Canet Pattern 1892 50-caliber guns. The gun fired 10.8-pound (4.9 kg) shells to a range of about 8,600 yards (7,864 m) at its maximum elevation of 21° with a muzzle velocity of 2,700 ft/s (820 m/s). The rate of fire was between twelve and fifteen rounds per minute. The ships also mounted seven 47-millimeter (1.9 in) Hotchkiss guns. They fired a 3.3-pound (1.5 kg) shell at a muzzle velocity of 1,476 ft/s (450 m/s) at a rate of 20 rounds per minute to a range of 2,020 yards (1,850 m). The Amur-class ships mounted one 15-inch (381 mm) torpedo tube and carried 300 mines.

== Service ==
Both ships, Amur and Yenisei, were built by the Baltic Works in Saint Petersburg. They were laid down in 1898 and completed the following year. They were assigned to the Pacific Fleet when the Russo-Japanese War began in 1904 and based in Port Arthur. Two days after the Japanese surprise attack on Port Arthur on 8/9 February 1904, Yenisei was laying a minefield at Dalian Bay when one mine broke loose and began floating towards the ship. While maneuvering to avoid the mine Yenisei accidentally entered the minefield that she'd just laid and hit a mine. The consequent explosion caused eight mines still on the rails to detonate, killing 96 or 100 crewmen and sinking the ship in 20 minutes. The protected cruiser Boyarin and four destroyers responded to the incident, but Boyarin hit one of Yenisei's mines. The explosion flooded the ship's machinery spaces and her crew abandoned ship. The cruiser remained afloat, but foundered in Dalian Bay the next day during a storm.

On the morning of 15 May 1904, Rear Admiral Nashiba Tokioki led a squadron consisting of the pre-dreadnoughts Hatsuse, Yashima and Shikishima to bombard Port Arthur. They encountered a field of 50 mines laid by Amur the evening before. Hatsuse hit one mine that disabled her engines and steering and drifted into another mine that caused one of her forward magazines to detonate. The ship sank in about 90 seconds, taking 496 men down with her. Yashima struck another mine as she maneuvered around the drifting Hatsuse, but she was towed away from the minefield. By the late afternoon Yashima's flooding had become unstoppable and she was abandoned by her crew. Three hours later the ship capsized and sank.

Amur was subsequently besieged in Port Arthur and hit in drydock a number of times by 28-centimetre (11 in) howitzer shells on 8 December 1904. She was knocked over on her port side and rested on the side of the dock at an angle of 68°. On 18 December she was hit again by 30 shells and sunk on her side. The Japanese later raised the ship and scrapped it.

== See also ==
- Timeline of Russian inventions and technology records
