= Minelayer =

Military vehicle built for process of deploying explosive mines

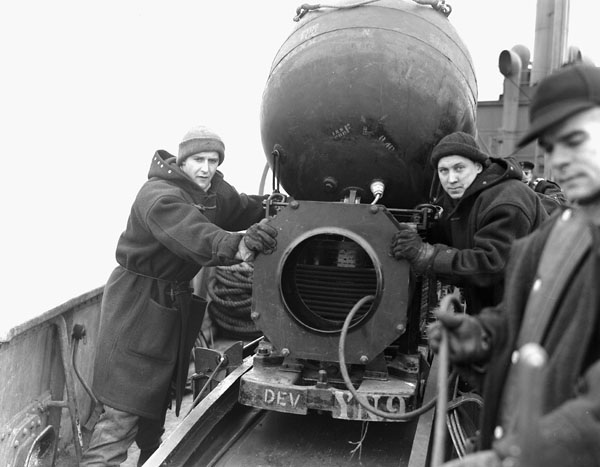
Canadian sailors with a mine aboard the minelayer HMCS Sankaty off Halifax, Nova Scotia in World War II.

A minelayer is any warship, submarine, military aircraft or land vehicle that is capable of deploying explosive mines. Since World War I, the term "minelayer" refers specifically to a naval ship used for deploying naval mines. "Mine planting" was the term for installing controlled mines at predetermined positions in connection with coastal fortifications or harbor approaches that would be detonated by shore control when a ship was fixed as being within the mine's effective range.

An army's special-purpose combat engineering vehicles used to lay landmines are sometimes called "minelayers".

== Etymology ==
Before World War I, mine ships were termed mine planters generally. For example, in an address to the United States Navy ships of Mine Squadron One at Portland, England, Admiral Sims used the term "mine layer" while the introduction speaks of the men assembled from the "mine planters". During and after that war the term "mine planter" became particularly associated with defensive coastal fortifications. The term "minelayer" was applied to vessels deploying both defensive- and offensive mine barrages and large scale sea mining. "Minelayer" lasted well past the last common use of "mine planter" in the late 1940s.

== Naval minelayers ==
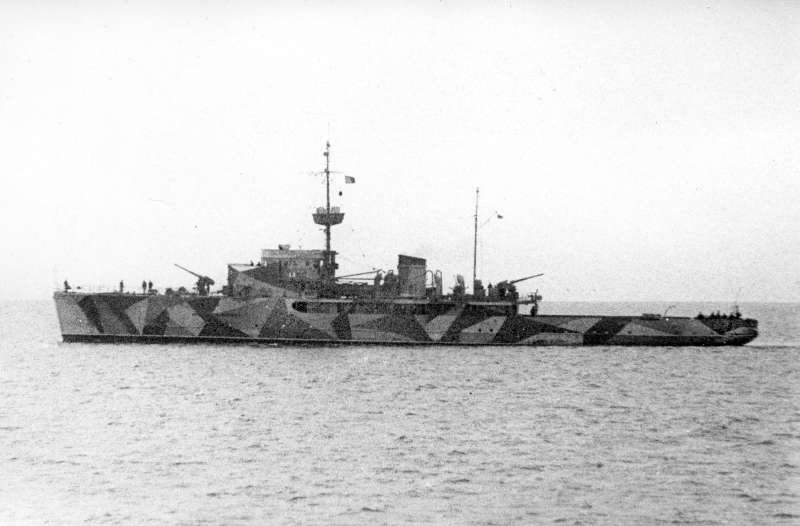
Amiral Murgescu of the Romanian Navy, a successful World War II minelayer that was also employed as a destroyer escort

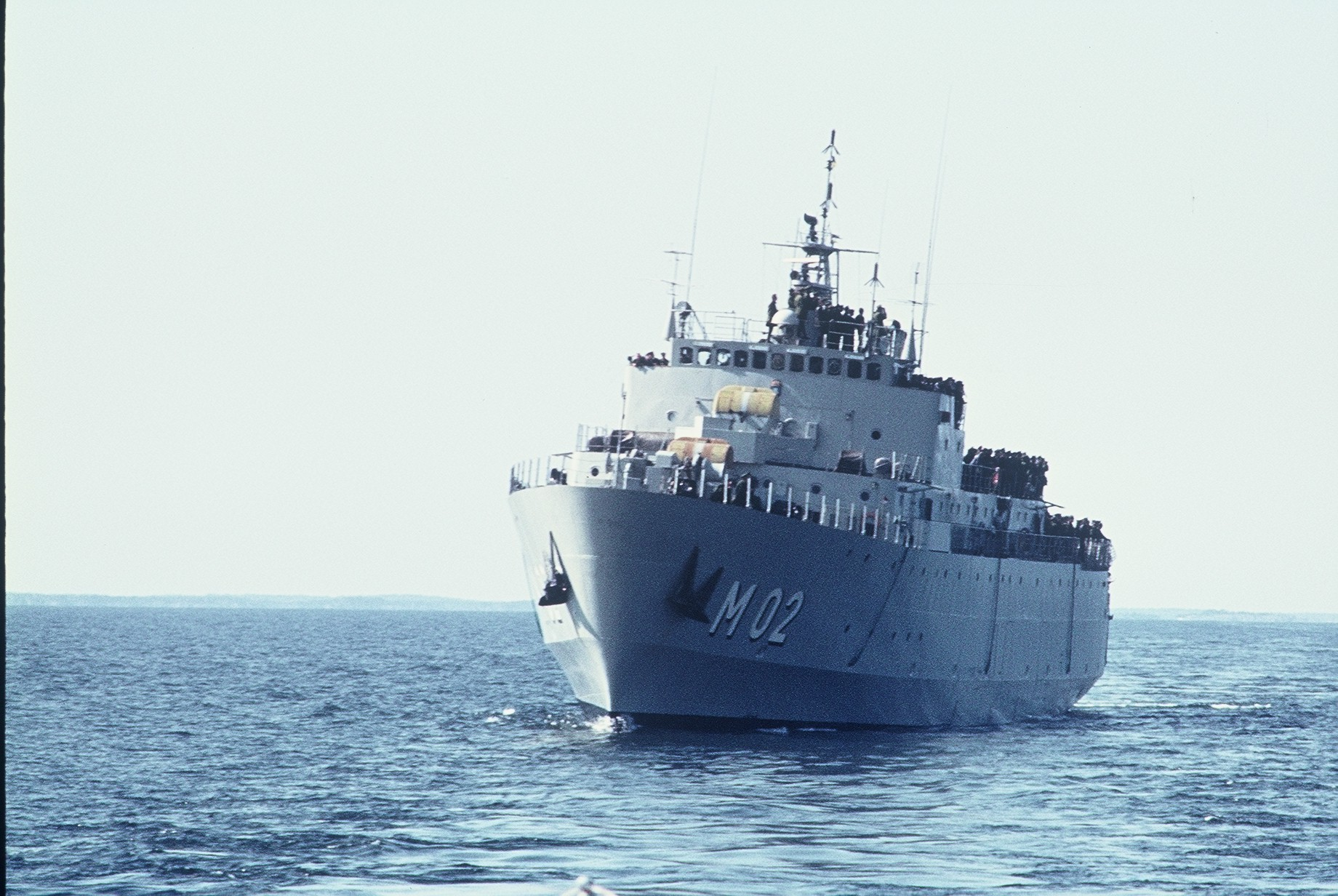
Swedish minelayer Älvsborg (1974)

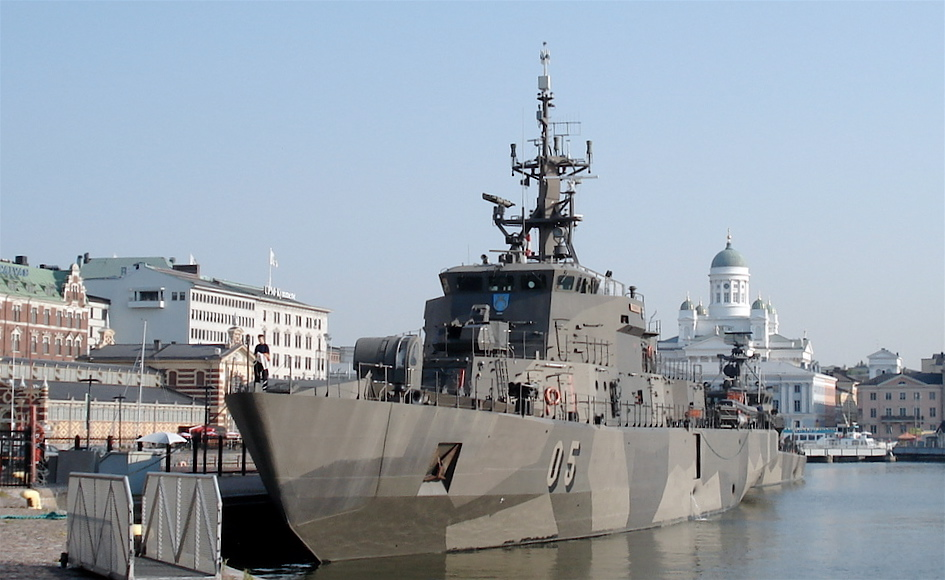
Finnish Navy Hämeenmaa-class minelayer FNS Uusimaa

The most common use of the term minelayer is a naval ship used for deploying sea mines. Russian minelayers were highly efficient sinking the Japanese battleships Hatsuse and Yashima in 1904 in the Russo-Japanese War. In the Gallipoli Campaign of World War I, mines laid by the Ottoman Empire's Navy's Nusret sank HMS Irresistible, HMS Ocean, and the French battleship Bouvet in the Dardanelles on 18 March 1915.

In World War II, the British employed the Abdiel minelayers both as minelayers and as transports to isolated garrisons, such as Malta and Tobruk. Their combination of high speed (up to 40 knots) and carrying capacity was highly valued. The French used the same concept for the cruiser Pluton.

A naval minelayer can vary considerably in size, from coastal boats of several hundred tonnes in displacement to destroyer-like ships of several thousand tonnes displacement. Apart from their loads of sea mines, most would also carry other weapons for self-defense, with some armed well enough to carry out other combat operations besides minelaying, such as the World War II Romanian minelayer Amiral Murgescu, which was successfully employed as a convoy escort due to her armament (2 × 105 mm, 2 × 37 mm, 4 × 20 mm, 2 machine guns, 2 depth charge throwers).

Submarines can also be minelayers. The first submarine to be designed as such was the Russian submarine Krab. USS Argonaut (SM-1) was another such minelaying submarine. Although there are no modern dedicated submarine minelayers, mines sized to be deployed from a submarine's torpedo tubes, such as the Stonefish, allow any submarine to be a minelayer.

In modern times, few navies worldwide still possess minelaying vessels. The United States Navy, for example, uses aircraft to lay sea mines instead. Mines themselves have evolved from purely passive to active; for example the US CAPTOR (enCAPsulated TORpedo) that sits as a mine until detecting a target, then launches a torpedo.

A few navies still have dedicated minelayers in commission, including those of South Korea, Poland, Sweden and Finland; countries with long, shallow coastlines where sea mines are most effective. Other navies have plans to create improvised minelayers in times of war, for example by rolling sea-mines into the sea from the vehicle deck through the open aft doors of a Roll-on/roll-off ferry. In 1984, the Libyan Navy was suspected of having mined the Red Sea a few nautical miles south of the Suez Canal using the Ro-Ro ferry Ghat, other nations suspected of having similar wartime plans include Iran and North Korea.

== Aerial minelaying ==
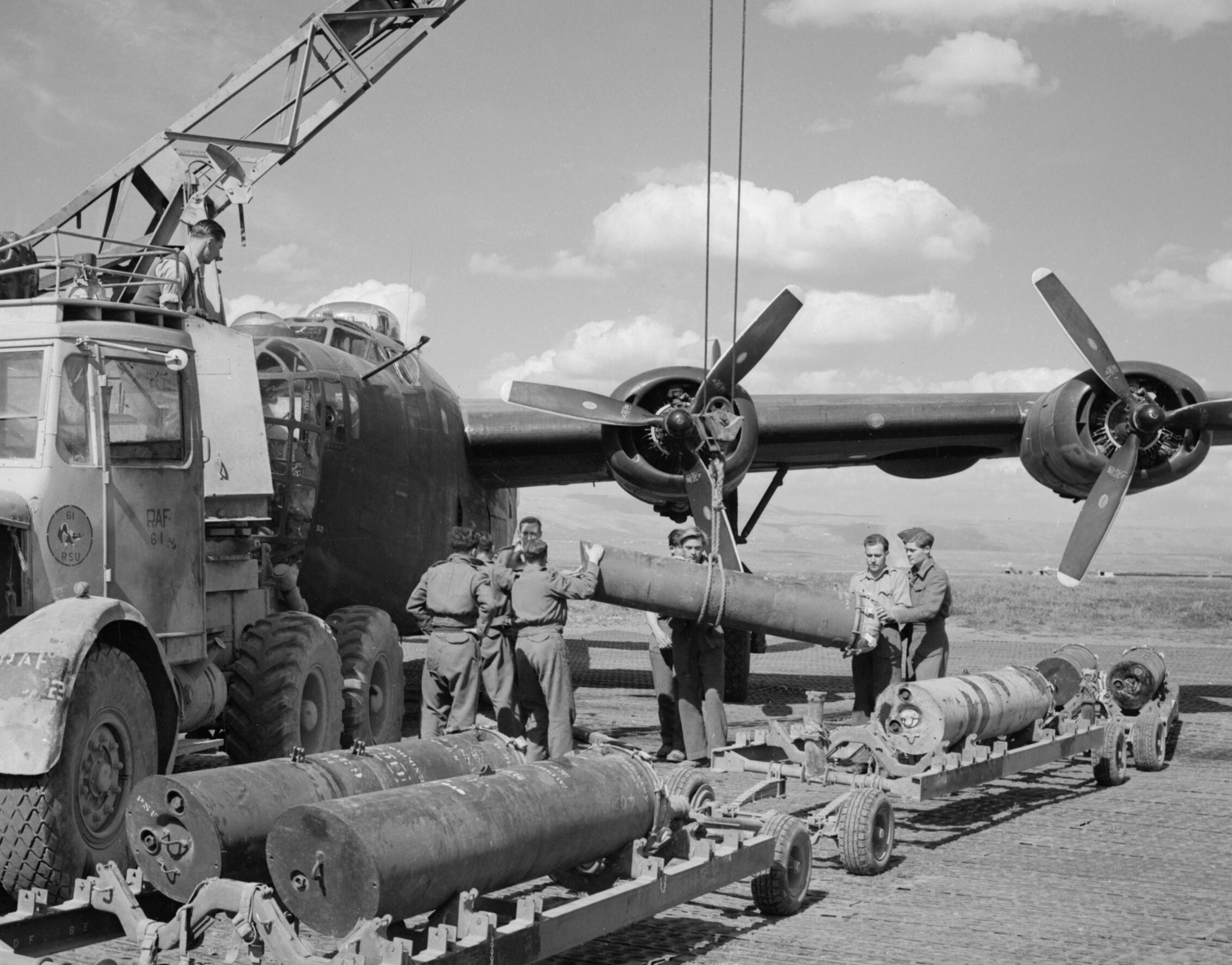
A Royal Air Force Liberator bomber loaded with parachute mines

Beginning in World War II, military aircraft were used to deliver naval mines by dropping them, attached to a parachute. Germany, Britain and the United States made significant use of aerial minelaying.

A new type of magnetic mine dropped by a German aircraft in a campaign of mining the Thames Estuary in 1939 landed in a mudflat, where disposal experts determined how it worked, which allowed Britain to fashion appropriate mine countermeasures.

The British Royal Air Force minelaying operations were codenamed "Gardening". As well as mining the North Sea and approaches to German ports, mines were laid in the Danube River near Belgrade, Yugoslavia, starting on 8 April 1944, to block the shipments of petroleum products from the refineries at Ploiești, Romania.

"Gardening" operations by the RAF were also sometimes used to assist in code breaking activities at Bletchley Park. Mines would be laid, at Bletchley Park's request, in specific locations. Resulting German radio transmissions were then monitored for clues which could help deciphering messages encoded by the Germans using Enigma machines.

In the Pacific, the US dropped thousands of mines in Japanese home waters, contributing to that country's defeat.

Aerial mining was also used in the Korean and Vietnam Wars. In Vietnam, rivers and coastal waters were extensively mined with a modified bomb called a destructor that proved very successful.

== Landmine laying ==
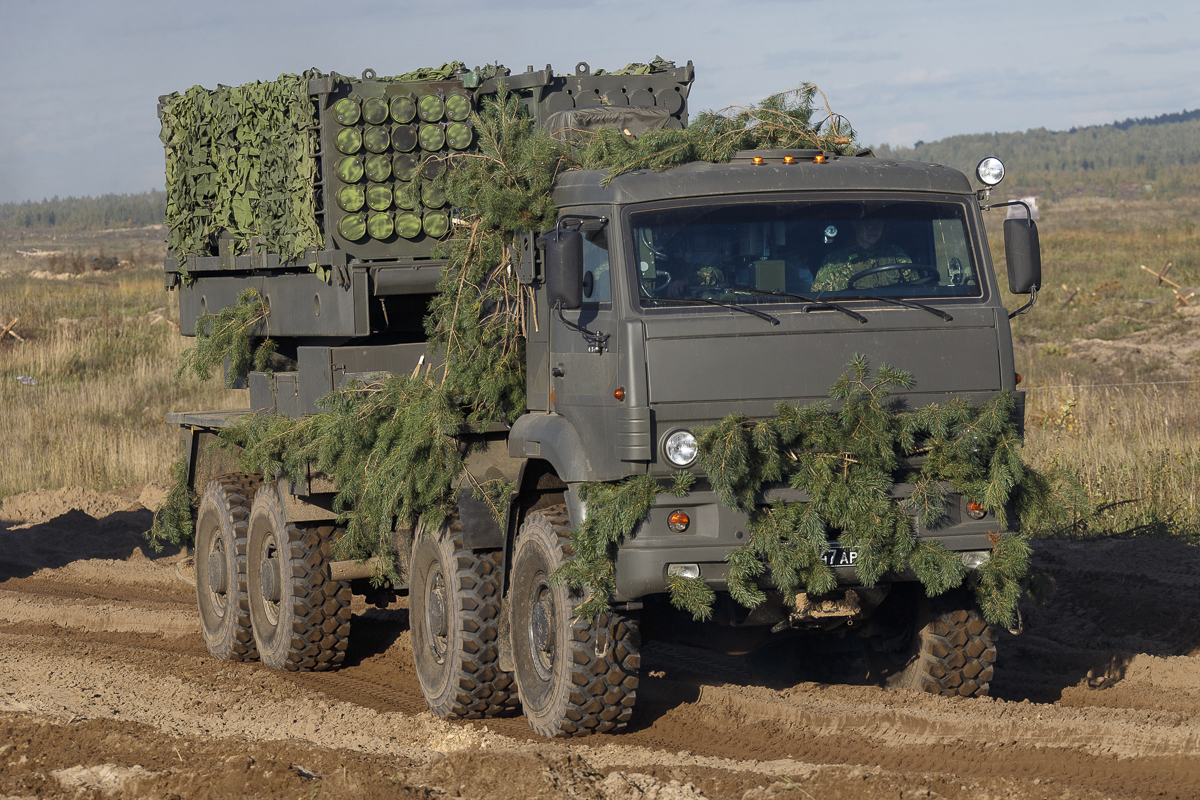
Zemledeliye remote minelayer

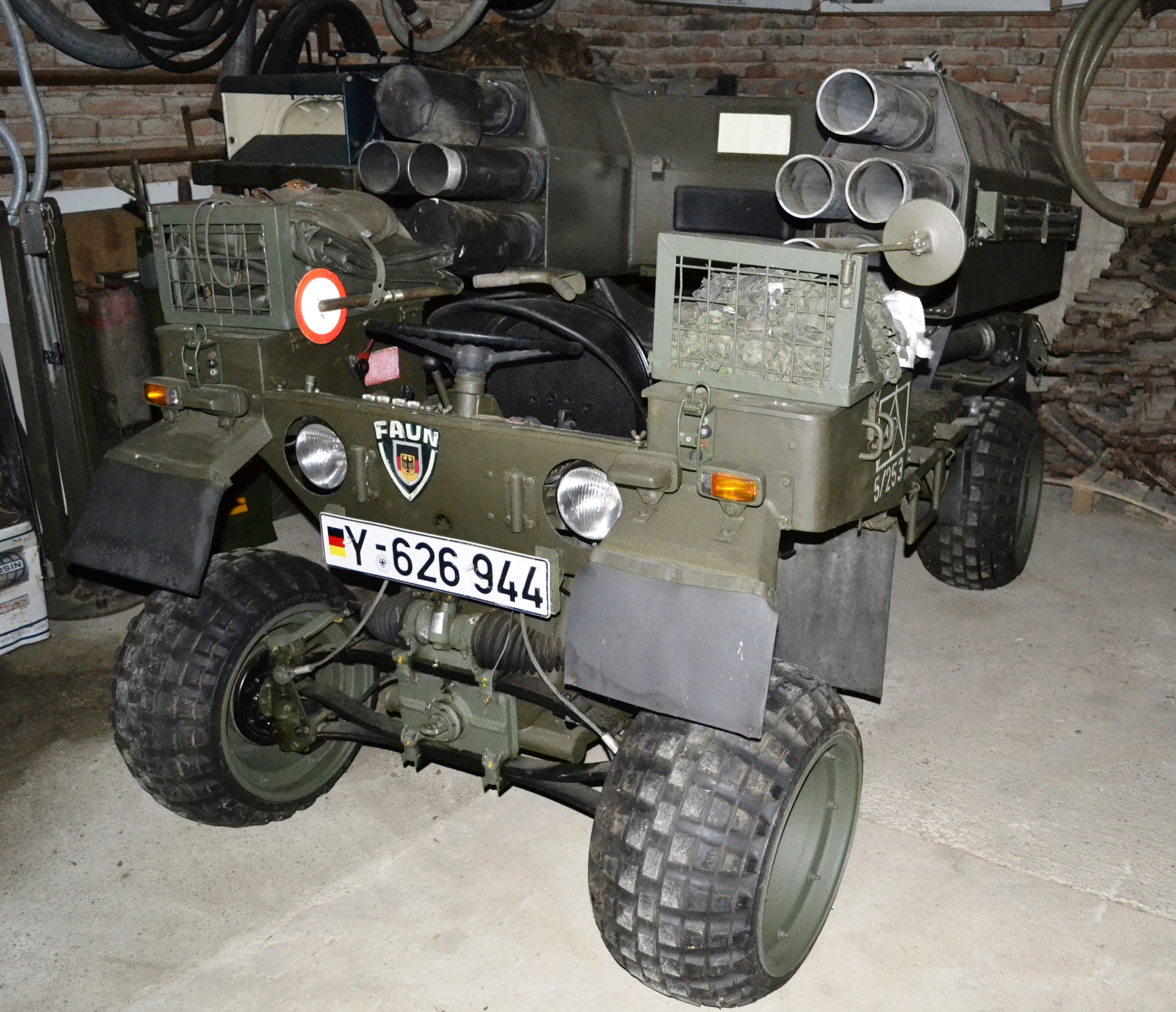
Faun Kraka rocket minelayer

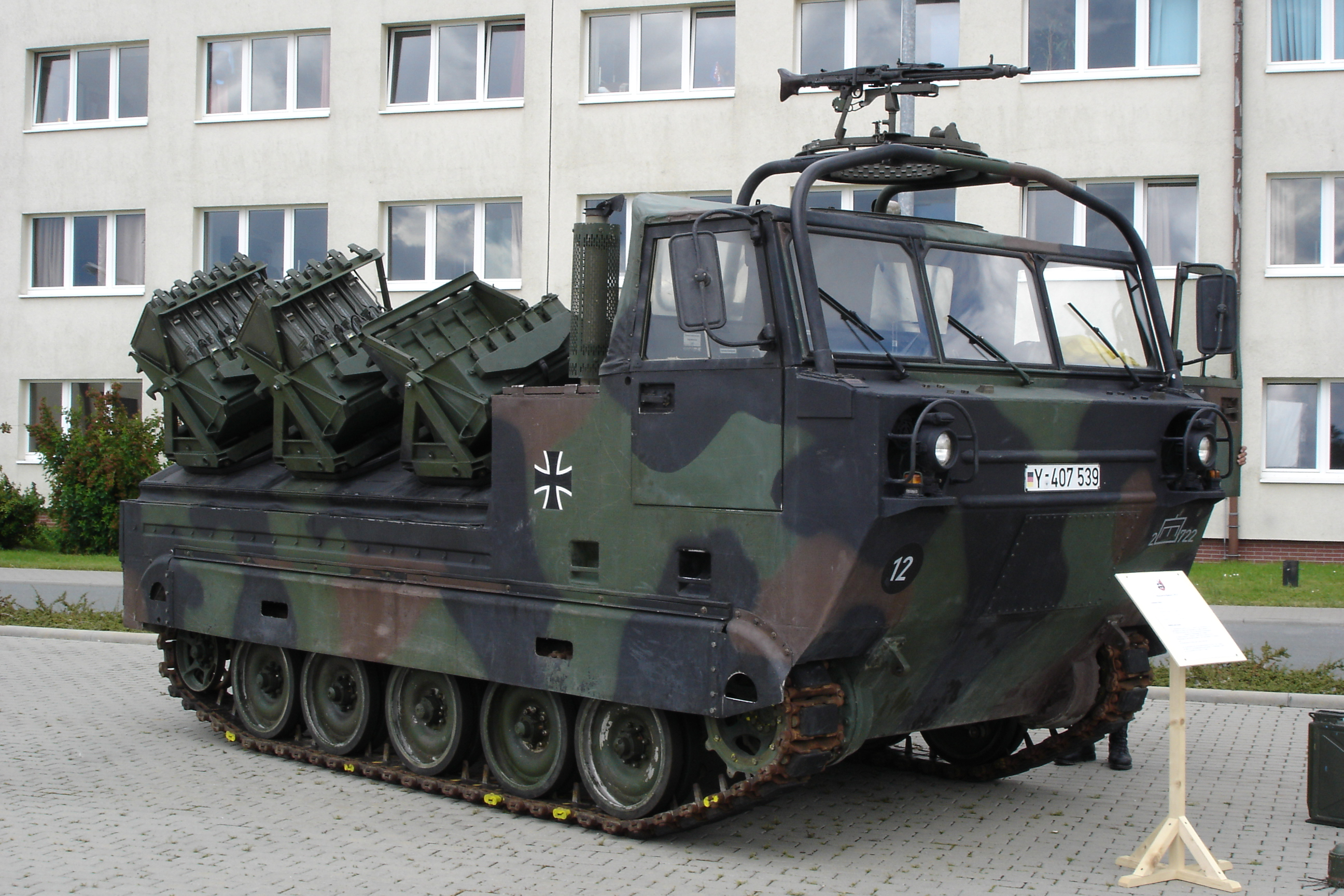
Skorpion minelayer

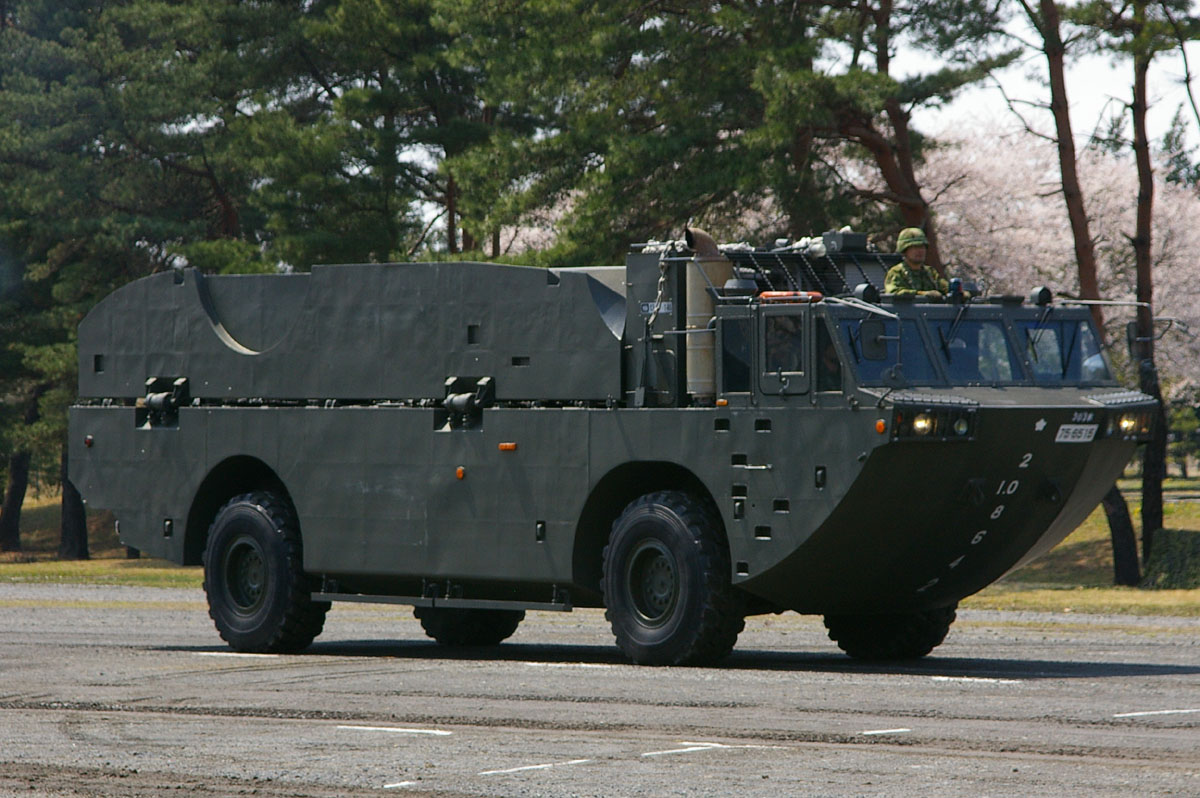
JGSDF Type 94 minelayer

Some examples of minelaying vehicles:

- Shielder minelaying system
- Zemledeliye (minelaying system)
- Faun Kraka rocket minelayer
- GMZ family of minelayers, which the 2S4 Tyulpan is based on, using TM-62 series mines
- Minenwerfer Skorpion
- Type 94 Minelayer
- Istrice (M113 variant)

== See also ==
- List of minelayer ship classes
- List of mine warfare vessels of the US Navy in the Second World War
- Mine Planter Service (U.S. Army)
- Minesweeper (ship)
- Submarine mines in United States harbor defense
