= Ottoman minelayer Nusret =

Ottoman Navy ship

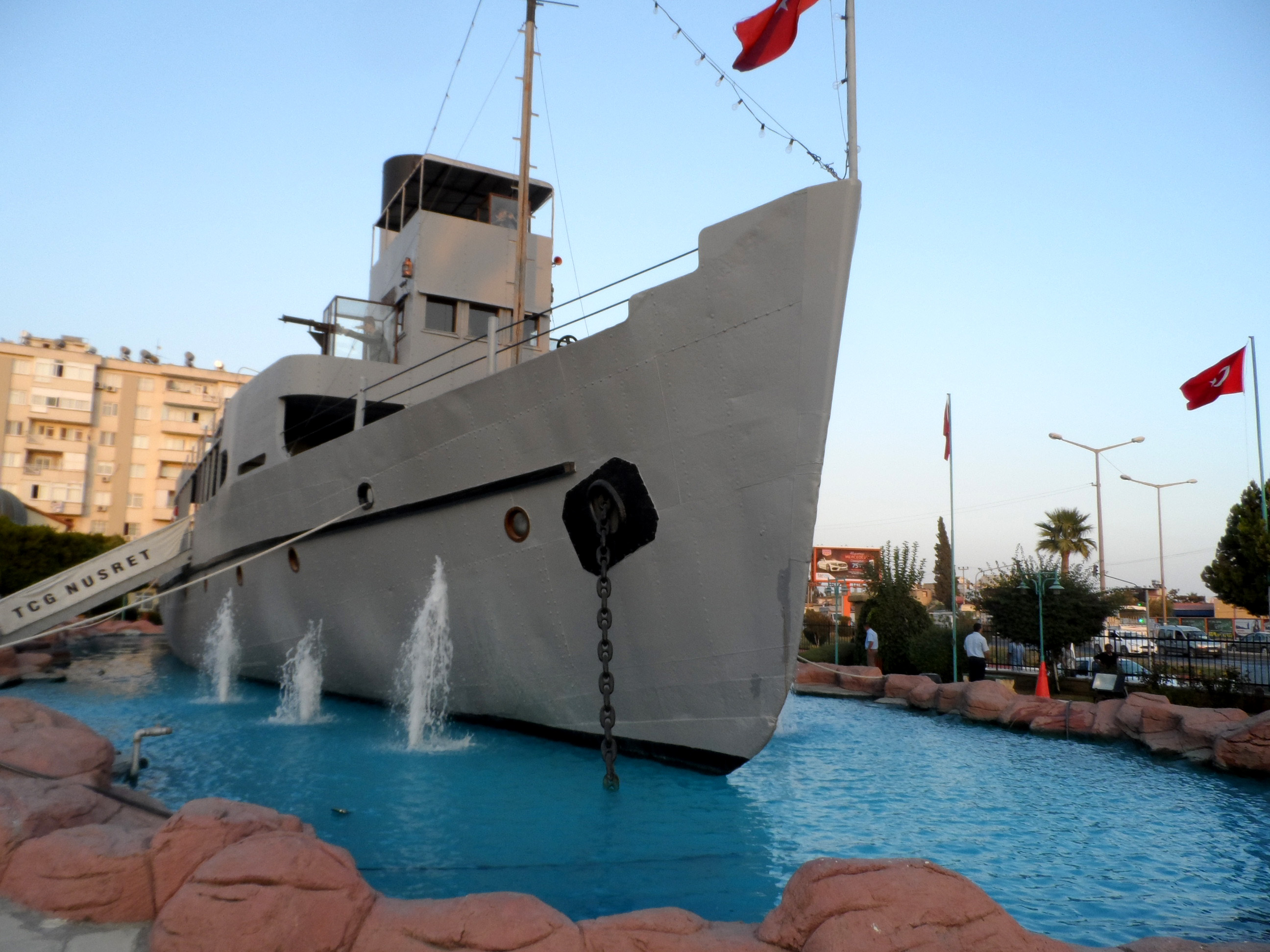
- Nusret in Tarsus

History

Ottoman Empire
- Name: Nusret
- Builder: Schiffs & Maschinenbau AG Germania, Kiel, German Empire
- Laid down: 1911
- Launched: 4 December 1911
- Commissioned: 1913
- Decommissioned: October 1918 and laid up

Turkey
- Name: Nusret (1922), Yardım (1937), Nusret (1939), Kaptan Nusret (1966)
- Decommissioned: 1955 and laid up at Gölcük, for conversion to museum ship
- Reclassified: Diver vessel (1937), tender (1939)
- Refit: Sold 1962 to commercial interests and rebuilt 1962-1966 to general cargo motorship
- Fate: April 1989 capsized near Mersin, 1999 salvaged, 2003 memorial/museum ship

General characteristics
- Type: Minelayer
- Displacement: 365 t
- Length: 40.20 m (131 ft 11 in) (LPP)
- Beam: 7.50 m (24 ft 7 in)
- Depth: 3.40 m (11 ft 2 in)
- Installed power: 1200ihp
- Propulsion: 2 triple 3 cyl. vertical engines; 2 Schultz water-tube boilers
- Speed: 15 knots (28 km/h; 17 mph) (trials); 12 knots (22 km/h; 14 mph) (1914)
- Armament: 1913: 2 × 47mm SK L/45 C/99 Krupp quick-firing guns; 40 mines; 1927: 2 × 57mm SK L/45 C/99 quick-firing guns; 60 mines

Nusret was a naval ship of the Ottoman Navy, which served as a minelayer during the Gallipoli Campaign, and later fulfilled various roles in the Turkish Navy; as minelayer (1927–1937), diver vessel (1937–1939) and tender (1939–1955). She was laid down in 1911 and launched from Schiff & Maschinenbau AG 'Germania' at Kiel, Germany on 4 December of that year.

== Characteristics ==
Nusret was 40.2 meters long and displaced 365 tons. Her beam was 7.57 meters and her draught was 3.4 meters. Her propulsion was two vertical triple expansion steam engines powered by two Schultz boilers, driving twin screws. This system was designed to propel her at 15 knots, but when she arrived at Istanbul in 1913 she could only make 13 knots. She was designed on the basis of a tugboat, but with mine rails for forty mines on the stern instead of bollards and winches. A crane was mounted on the back end of her superstructure, aft of the funnel, to assist in loading the mines. Aside from the mines, her armament consisted of two 47mm SK L/45 C/99 quick-firing guns mounted on platforms on either side of the bridge, manufactured by Krupp in Germany. In 1927 these guns were replaced by 57mm variants of the same weapon; also in 1927 her mine rails were extended to hold twenty extra mines.

== Service history ==
Nusret was commissioned into the Ottoman Navy in 1913, captained by Lieutenant Tophaneli Hakki (Güverte Kıdemli Yüzbaşı Tophaneli İbrahim oğlu Hakkı) under the command of Lieutenant-Colonel Geehl. Nusret played a pivotal role in the Dardanelles Campaign, laying 26 mines in an unexpected position in February 1915 just prior to the ill-fated invasion which sank HMS Irresistible, HMS Ocean, and the French battleship Bouvet and left the British battlecruiser HMS Inflexible badly damaged.

After World War I, Nusret was laid up in Istanbul until 1926-7 when she was refitted at Gölcük. In 1937, she became the diving vessel Yardin and, in 1939, reverted to Nusret as a tender. In 1955, she was decommissioned and again laid up, with the intention to convert her to a museum ship. However, in 1962, she was sold to commercial buyers who had her converted to a cargo motorship, unrecognisable as the former minelayer, entering service as Kaptan Nusret in 1966. In April 1989, she sank near Mersin Harbour and lay submerged for 10 years.

=== Wreck discovery ===
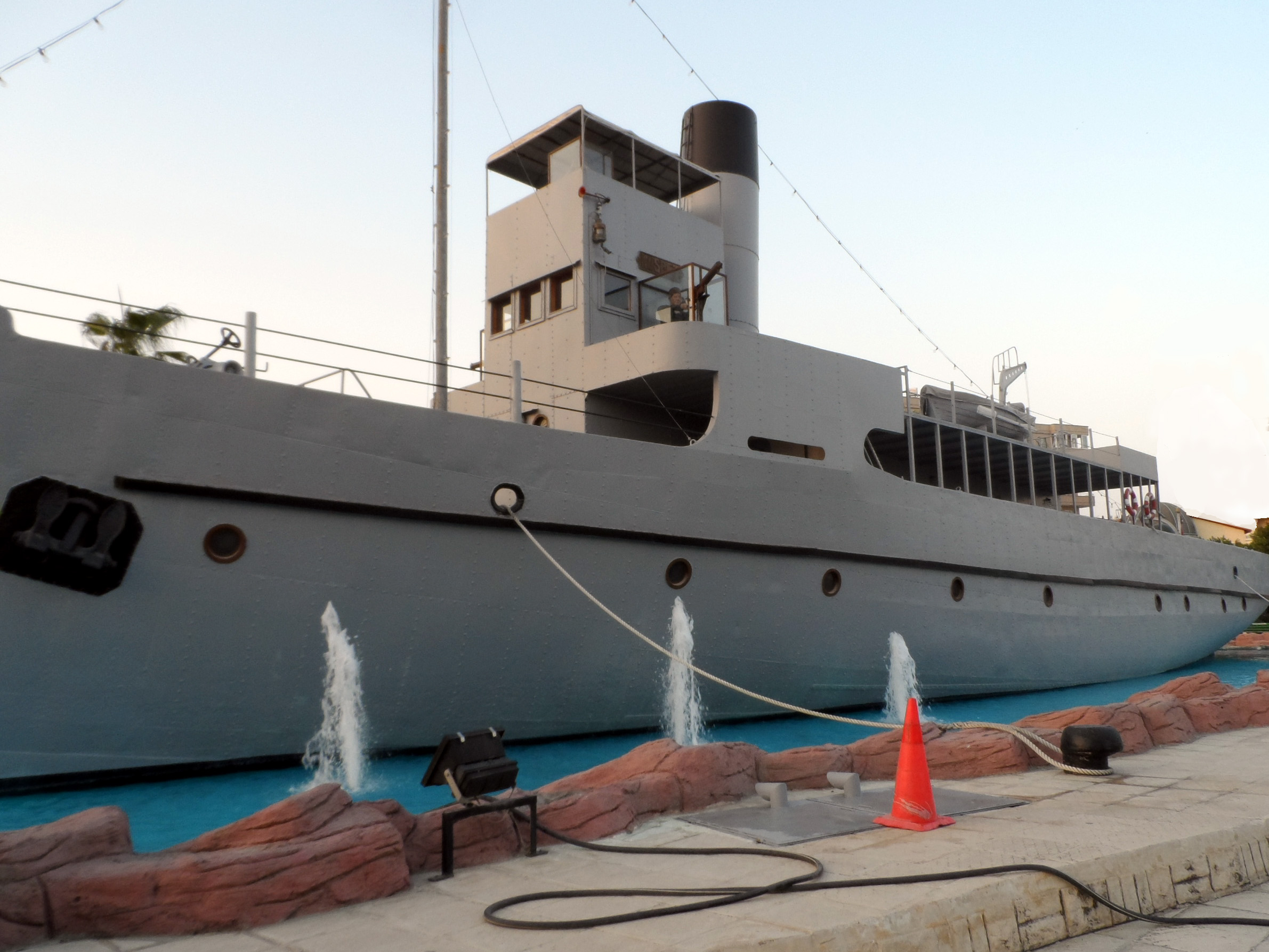
Nusret minelayer rescued and repaired, now in Tarsus Çanakkale Park Museum

In 2002, the wreck of Nusret was acquired by the Municipality of Tarsus, Mersin Province for reconstruction ashore as a museum ship, opened in 2008.

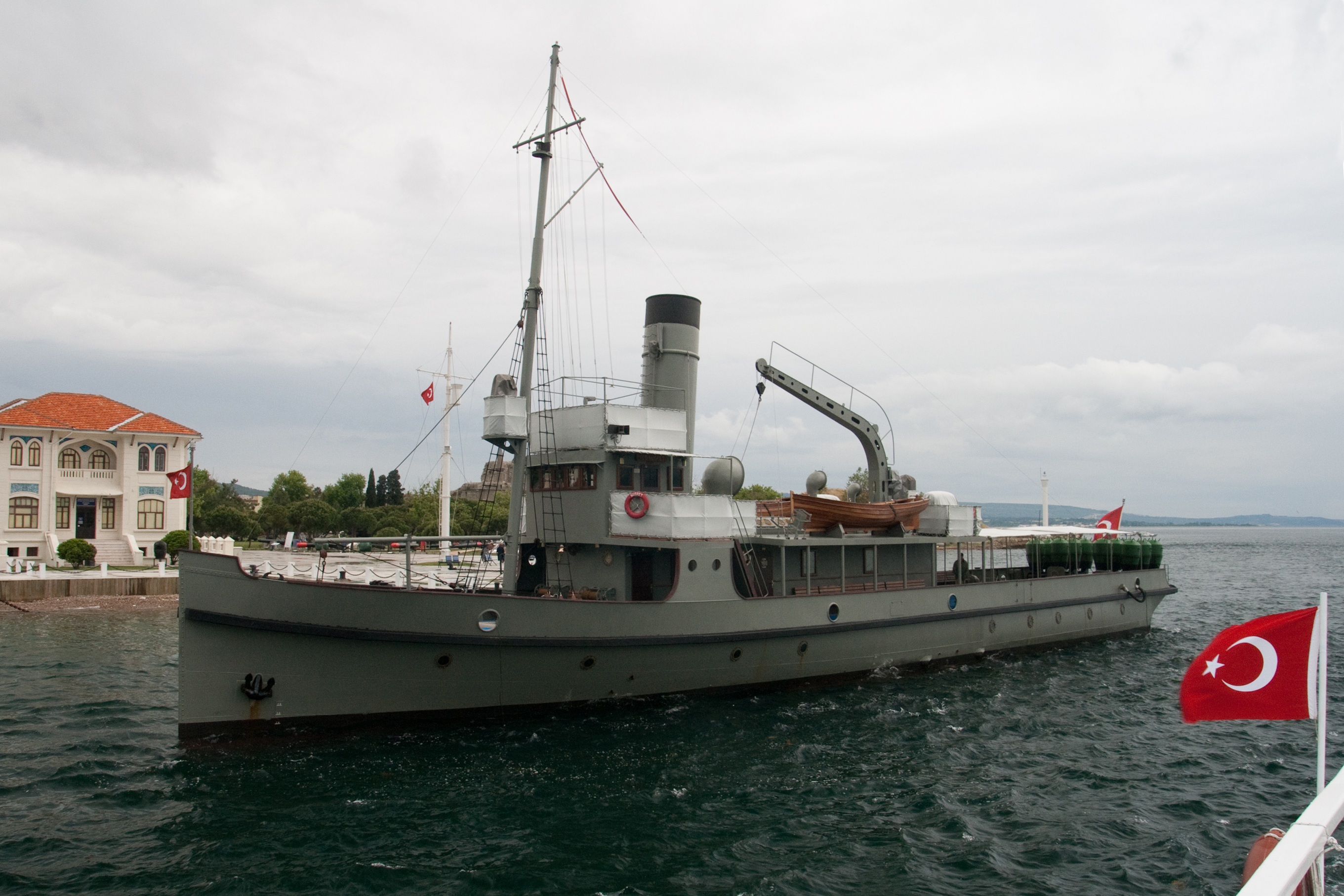
Replica

A replica Nusret has been built by the Gölcük Naval Shipyard to be displayed in Çanakkale by the shore of the Narrows of the Dardanelles along with the types of mines that it laid in World War I. In March 2011, this Nusret was commissioned into the Turkish Navy as the museum ship N-16.

== See also ==
- Gonca, the only other surviving Ottoman minelayer from the First World War.

== Bibliography ==
- Gibbs, Jay (September 2017). "Question 26/51". Warship International. LIV (3): 186–189. ISSN 0043-0374.
- Langensiepen, Bernd; Güleryüz, Ahmet (1995). The Ottoman Steam Navy 1828–1923. London: Conway Maritime Press. ISBN 978-0-85177-610-1.
