= HSwMS Älvsborg =

Swedish minelayer

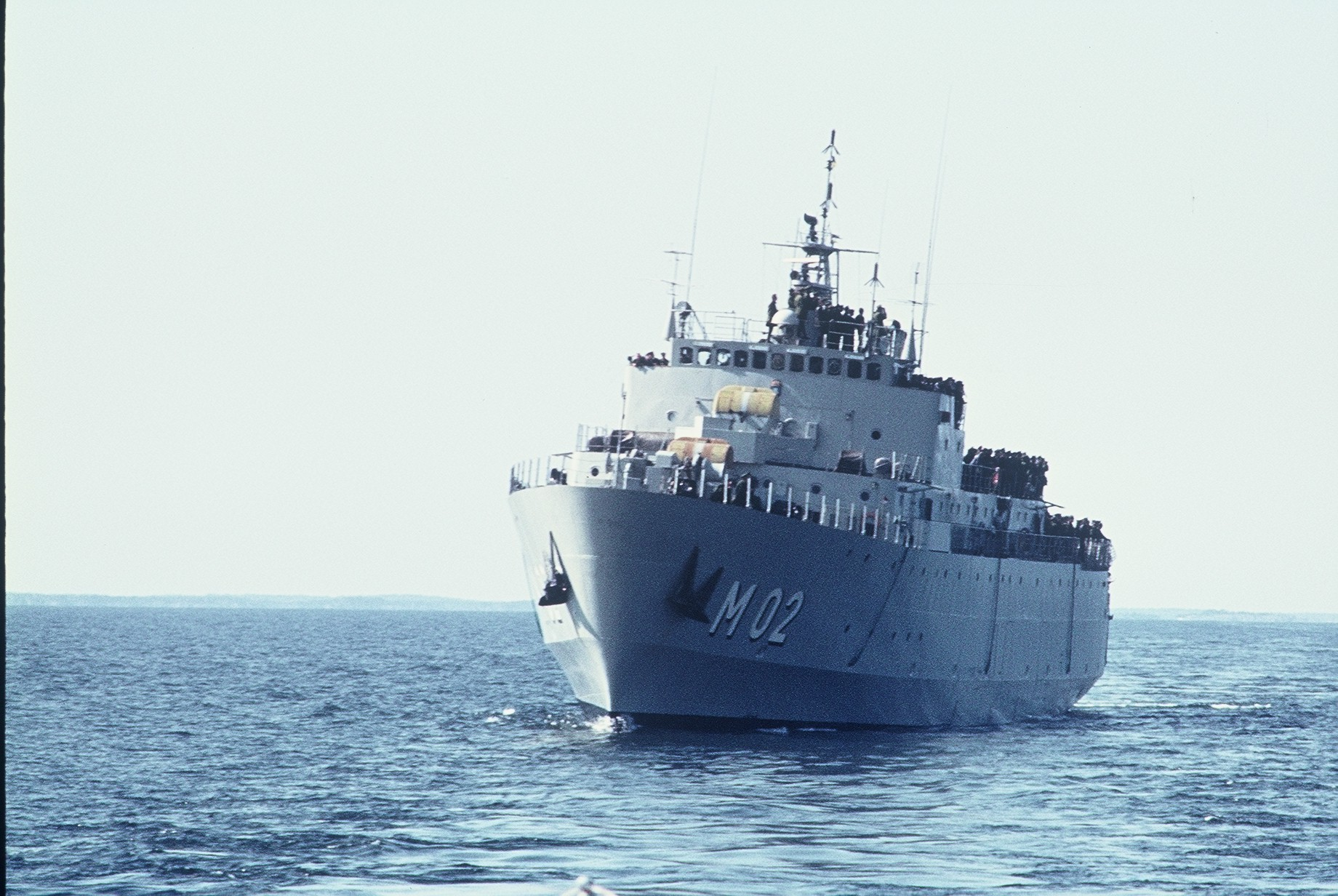
- HSwMS Älvsborg

History

Sweden
- Name: Älvsborg
- Namesake: Älvsborg
- Ordered: 1968
- Builder: Karlskronavarvet AB
- Launched: 11 November 1969
- Commissioned: 10 April 1971
- Decommissioned: 1995
- Notes: As M02 from 1971-1997 with the role as a minelayer.

Chile
- Name: Almirante José Toribio Merino Castro
- Namesake: José Toribio Merino Castro
- Commissioned: 7 February 1997
- Decommissioned: 2015

General characteristics
- Class & type: Auxiliary
- Displacement: 2,660 long tons (2,700 t)
- Length: 92.4 m (303.1 ft)
- Beam: 14.7 m (48.2 ft)
- Draught: 4.0 m (13.2 ft)
- Propulsion: 2 x NOHAB V12-diesel engines at 1,545 kW (2,072 hp) each
- Speed: 16 knots (30 km/h; 18 mph)
- Complement: 95
- Sensors & processing systems: PN-613; PN-619; PS-726; PE-727
- Electronic warfare & decoys: PQ-826
- Armament: 3 × 40 mm (1.6 in) Bofors m/48 guns; 4 machine gun groups

HSwMS Älvsborg (M02) was a minelayer in the Swedish Navy, launched on 11 November 1969. She had one sister ship, HSwMS Visborg. She belonged to the 1st Submarine Flotilla and served as leader of the division. In 1997, Älvsborg was sold to Chile and was renamed Almirante José Toribio Merino Castro. She was taken out of service on 15 January 2015.

== Bibliography ==
- Baker III, A.D. (1998). The Naval Institute Guide To Combat Fleets of the World 1998–1999. Annapolis, Maryland, USA: Naval Institute Press. ISBN 1-55750-111-4.
- Gardiner, Robert; Chumbley, Stephen, eds. (1995). Conway's All The World's Fighting Ships 1947–1995. Annapolis, Maryland, USA: Naval Institute Press. ISBN 1-55750-132-7.
- Prézelin, Bernard; Baker III, A.D., eds. (1990). The Naval Institute Guide To Combat Fleets of the World 1990/1991. Annapolis, Maryland: Naval Institute Press. ISBN 0-87021-250-8.
- Saunders, Stephen (2004). Jane's fighting ships, 2004-2005. Coulsdon, Surrey, UK; Alexandria, Virginia: Jane's Information Group. ISBN 9780710626233.
